= List of stars in Vela =

This is the list of notable stars in the constellation Vela, sorted by decreasing brightness.

This constellation's Bayer designations (Greek-letter star names) were given while it was still considered part of the constellation of Argo Navis. After Argo Navis was broken up into Carina, Vela, and Puppis, these Greek-letter designations were kept, so that Vela does not have a full complement of Greek-letter designations. For example, since Argo Navis's alpha star went to Carina, there is no Alpha Velorum.

Name	B	Var	HD	HIP	RA	Dec	vis. mag.	abs. mag.	Dist. (ly)	Sp. class	Notes
γ^{2} Vel	γ^{2}		68273	39953	08^{h} 09^{m} 31.96^{s}	−47° 20′ 11.8″	1.83	−5.84	1120	WC8 + O7.5III	Suhail, Suhail al Muhlif, Muliphein, Regor; double star; Wolf-Rayet star, V_{max} = 1.81^{m}, V_{min} = 1.87^{m}
δ Vel	δ		74956	42913	08^{h} 44^{m} 42.20^{s}	−54° 42′ 30.8″	1.96	0.00	81	A1Va(n)	Koo She, Alsephina; quadruple star; Algol variable, ΔV = 0.4^{m}, P = 45.15 d
λ Vel	λ		78647	44816	09^{h} 07^{m} 59.78^{s}	−43° 25′ 57.4″	2.21	−3.97	573	K4Ib-II	Suhail, Suhail al Muhlif, Al Suhail, Alsuhail, Suhail Alwazn, Muliphein; semiregular variable, V_{max} = 2.14^{m}, V_{min} = 2.3^{m}
κ Vel	κ		81188	45941	09^{h} 22^{m} 06.83^{s}	−55° 00′ 38.5″	2.47	−3.62	539	B2IV	Markeb; Markab
μ Vel	μ		93497	52727	10^{h} 46^{m} 46.12^{s}	−49° 25′ 12.5″	2.69	−0.06	116	G5III SB	
HD 82668	N		82668	46701	09^{h} 31^{m} 13.35^{s}	−57° 02′ 03.8″	3.16	−1.15	238	K5III	semiregular variable, V_{max} = 3.12^{m}, V_{min} = 3.18^{m}
φ Vel	φ		86440	48774	09^{h} 56^{m} 51.75^{s}	−54° 34′ 04.1″	3.52	−5.34	1929	B5Ib	Tseen Ke
ο Vel	ο		74195	42536	08^{h} 40^{m} 17.61^{s}	−52° 55′ 19.1″	3.60	−2.31	495	B3IV	in IC 2391; slowly pulsating B star, V_{max} = 3.57^{m}, V_{min} = 3.63^{m}, P = 2.80 d
HD 78004	c		78004	44511	09^{h} 04^{m} 09.32^{s}	−47° 05′ 51.8″	3.75	−1.13	309	K2III	
HD 74180	b		74180	42570	08^{h} 40^{m} 37.58^{s}	−46° 38′ 55.5″	3.81	−7.06	4900	F3Ia	suspected variable, V_{max} = 3.80^{m}, V_{min} = 3.91^{m}
p Vel	p		92139	51986	10^{h} 37^{m} 18.26^{s}	−48° 13′ 32.2″	3.84	1.72	86	A3m+...	
HD 88955	q		88955	50191	10^{h} 14^{m} 44.27^{s}	−42° 07′ 19.4″	3.85	1.36	103	A2V	
HD 75063	a		75063	43023	08^{h} 46^{m} 01.65^{s}	−46° 02′ 29.5″	3.87	−4.52	1552	A1III	
ψ Vel A	ψ		82434A	46651	09^{h} 30^{m} 42.11^{s}	−40° 28′ 00.8″	3.91	2.57	61	F3VFe-0.7	
HD 74772	d		74772	42884	08^{h} 44^{m} 23.97^{s}	−42° 38′ 57.6″	4.05	−0.18	228	G5III	
HD 73634	e		73634	42312	08^{h} 37^{m} 38.64^{s}	−42° 59′ 20.8″	4.11	−4.11	1436	A6II	
γ^{1} Vel	γ^{1}		68243		08^{h} 09^{m} 29.30^{s}	−47° 20′ 45.0″	4.27	−3.62	840	B2III	component of the γ Vel system, spectroscopic binary; suspected variable
HD 92449	x		92449	52154	10^{h} 39^{m} 18.41^{s}	−55° 36′ 11.8″	4.29	−2.92	901	G2II	
HD 83446	M		83446	47175	09^{h} 36^{m} 49.66^{s}	−49° 21′ 18.5″	4.34	1.75	107	A5V	
HD 95370	i		95370	53773	11^{h} 00^{m} 09.25^{s}	−42° 13′ 33.1″	4.37	0.39	204	A3IV	
HD 77258	w		77258	44191	09^{h} 00^{m} 05.44^{s}	−41° 15′ 13.5″	4.47	0.52	201	K0III+...	suspected variable
MV Vel	J	MV	89890	50676	10^{h} 20^{m} 54.81^{s}	−56° 02′ 35.6″	4.49	−3.24	1150	B3III	Be star; ΔV = 0.06^{m}
HD 85622	m		85622	48374	09^{h} 51^{m} 40.69^{s}	−46° 32′ 51.5″	4.58	−3.03	1083	G5Ib	variable star, ΔV = 0.005^{m}, P = 1.64 d
GZ Vel		GZ	89682	50555	10^{h} 19^{m} 36.77^{s}	−55° 01′ 45.5″	4.59	−3.71	1489	K3II	slow irregular variable
HD 79940	k		79940	45448	09^{h} 15^{m} 45.07^{s}	−37° 24′ 47.3″	4.63	1.10	166	F3/F5V	
H Vel	H		76805	43878	08^{h} 56^{m} 19.28^{s}	−52° 43′ 24.6″	4.68	−0.63	376	B5V	
HD 74272	n		74272	42624	08^{h} 41^{m} 13.14^{s}	−47° 19′ 01.7″	4.74	−4.08	1895	A5II	
HD 70930	B		70930	41039	08^{h} 22^{m} 31.70^{s}	−48° 29′ 25.4″	4.82	−3.79	1720	B1V	suspected variable
HD 89998	r		89998	50799	10^{h} 22^{m} 19.61^{s}	−41° 39′ 00.4″	4.82	0.88	200	K1IIIvar	
HY Vel		HY	74560	42726	08^{h} 42^{m} 25.41^{s}	−53° 06′ 50.5″	4.83	−1.01	479	B3IV	in IC 2391; slowly pulsating B star, V_{max} = 4.81^{m}, V_{min} = 4.86^{m}, P = 1.55 d
HD 88206	Q		88206	49712	10^{h} 08^{m} 56.25^{s}	−51° 48′ 40.5″	4.85	−2.76	1083	B3IV	
HD 91324			91324	51523	10^{h} 31^{m} 22.23^{s}	−53° 42′ 57.6″	4.89	3.19	71	F6V	
HD 79917	l		79917	45439	09^{h} 15^{m} 36.76^{s}	−38° 34′ 11.7″	4.92	0.73	225	K1III	
HD 75710	g		75710	43347	08^{h} 49^{m} 47.65^{s}	−45° 18′ 28.5″	4.94	−2.08	827	A2III	
HD 72127			72127	41639	08^{h} 29^{m} 27.49^{s}	−44° 43′ 29.4″	4.99	−4.53	2610	B2IV	suspected variable
GX Vel		GX	79186	45085	09^{h} 11^{m} 04.40^{s}	−44° 52′ 04.5″	5.00	−5.81	4700	B5Ia	α Cyg variable, V_{max} = 4.97^{m}, V_{min} = 5.04^{m}
HD 73155	C		73155	42088	08^{h} 34^{m} 43.61^{s}	−49° 56′ 39.3″	5.01	−2.14	876	K1/K2II	variable star, ΔV = 0.004^{m}, P = 0.091 d
HD 83058	L		83058	46950	09^{h} 34^{m} 08.80^{s}	−51° 15′ 19.0″	5.01	−2.27	931	B1.5IV	
HD 91504	t		91504	51635	10^{h} 32^{m} 56.88^{s}	−47° 00′ 12.1″	5.02	−2.34	964	K4III	
HD 67582			67582	39690	08^{h} 06^{m} 40.34^{s}	−45° 15′ 57.8″	5.04	−2.86	1240	K3III	suspected variable, ΔV = 0.07^{m}
HD 87783			87783	49485	10^{h} 06^{m} 11.22^{s}	−47° 22′ 11.5″	5.06	0.57	258	K0IV	
GU Vel	F	GU	71935	41483	08^{h} 27^{m} 36.65^{s}	−53° 05′ 18.7″	5.08	1.10	204	A9/F0III/IV	δ Sct variable, V_{max} = 5.08^{m}, V_{min} = 5.11^{m}, P = 0.07 d
KX Vel	f	KX	75821	43413	08^{h} 50^{m} 33.46^{s}	−46° 31′ 45.1″	5.09	−4.50	2694	B0III	spectroscopic binary; Algol variable
HD 81848	I		81848	46283	09^{h} 26^{m} 17.98^{s}	−53° 22′ 44.2″	5.09	−0.47	422	B6V	variable star, ΔV = 0.008^{m}, P = 0.41 d
HD 85355	u		85355	48224	09^{h} 49^{m} 57.16^{s}	−45° 43′ 57.9″	5.09	−2.01	856	B7III	
ψ Vel B	ψ		82434B		09^{h} 30^{m} 42.11^{s}	−40° 28′ 00.8″	5.12	3.75	61		suspected variable
HD 80108			80108	45505	09^{h} 16^{m} 23.04^{s}	−44° 15′ 56.7″	5.12	−5.34	4025	K3Ib	variable star, ΔV = 0.006^{m}, P = 0.089 d
HD 82984			82984	46914	09^{h} 33^{m} 44.56^{s}	−49° 00′ 18.3″	5.12	−2.22	959	B4IV	suspected variable
NO Vel		NO	69144	40285	08^{h} 13^{m} 36.16^{s}	−46° 59′ 30.0″	5.14	−2.23	970	B2.5IV	eclipsing binary
HD 93563			93563	52742	10^{h} 46^{m} 57.49^{s}	−56° 45′ 25.9″	5.14	−0.99	548	B8/B9III	variable star, ΔV = 0.003^{m}, P = 0.87 d
HD 74753	D		74753	42834	08^{h} 43^{m} 40.28^{s}	−49° 49′ 22.1″	5.15	−3.19	1516	B0IIIn	
FZ Vel		FZ	77140	44093	08^{h} 58^{m} 52.43^{s}	−47° 14′ 05.4″	5.17	1.02	221	Am	δ Sct variable, V_{max} = 5.14^{m}, V_{min} = 5.17^{m}, P = 0.065 d
HD 71510			71510	41296	08^{h} 25^{m} 31.34^{s}	−51° 43′ 38.8″	5.18	−1.40	674	B2V	
NZ Vel		NZ	74146	42504	08^{h} 39^{m} 57.62^{s}	−53° 03′ 17.2″	5.18	−0.41	428	B4IV	in IC 2391; rotating ellipsoidal variable
HD 68217			68217	39961	08^{h} 09^{m} 35.92^{s}	−44° 07′ 22.0″	5.20	−2.51	1136	B2IV-V	suspected variable
NY Vel		NY	74067	42540	08^{h} 40^{m} 19.22^{s}	−40° 15′ 50.0″	5.20	0.53	280	Ap (SiCr)	α² CVn variable
LN Vel		LN	74371	42679	08^{h} 41^{m} 56.91^{s}	−45° 24′ 38.6″	5.20	−4.39	2694	B5Iab	α Cyg variable, V_{max} = 5.19^{m}, V_{min} = 5.25^{m}, P = 8.29 d
IS Vel		IS	68324	39970	08^{h} 09^{m} 43.16^{s}	−47° 56′ 14.0″	5.23	−2.02	921	B1IVe	β Cep variable
OY Vel		OY	77653	44337	09^{h} 01^{m} 44.57^{s}	−52° 11′ 19.4″	5.23	−0.41	437	Ap Si	α² CVn variable
HD 79735	z		79735	45344	09^{h} 14^{m} 24.50^{s}	−43° 13′ 39.1″	5.24	−0.92	556	B4V+...	variable star, ΔV = 0.006^{m}, P = 0.71 d
HD 79846			79846	45328	09^{h} 14^{m} 18.02^{s}	−55° 34′ 10.9″	5.26	−1.20	638	G8II/III	suspected variable
HD 80456	K		80456	45631	09^{h} 18^{m} 05.89^{s}	−51° 03′ 03.2″	5.26	−0.34	431	B7/B8III	
LW Vel		LW	88824	50070	10^{h} 13^{m} 22.88^{s}	−51° 13′ 58.6″	5.27	1.78	163	A7V	δ Sct variable, V_{max} = 5.24^{m}, V_{min} = 5.29^{m}, P = 0.11 d
HD 76360			76360	43671	08^{h} 53^{m} 50.60^{s}	−47° 31′ 14.6″	5.31	0.79	261	Am	
HD 80170			80170	45544	09^{h} 16^{m} 57.10^{s}	−39° 24′ 05.2″	5.31	0.12	355	K2III	
HD 72108	A		72108	41616	08^{h} 29^{m} 04.76^{s}	−47° 55′ 44.2″	5.33	−3.18	1638	B2IV	
HD 82694			82694	46811	09^{h} 32^{m} 19.27^{s}	−40° 38′ 57.6″	5.35	−0.04	390	G8III	
OP Vel		OP	75149	43082	08^{h} 46^{m} 30.55^{s}	−45° 54′ 45.1″	5.43	−4.59	3293	B3Ia	α Cyg variable
HD 83520			83520	47204	09^{h} 37^{m} 12.68^{s}	−53° 40′ 06.5″	5.44	1.16	234	A2/A3V	
HD 82419			82419	46594	09^{h} 30^{m} 05.13^{s}	−51° 31′ 01.9″	5.45	−0.08	415	B8V	
HR 3440		HW	74071	42459	08^{h} 39^{m} 23.87^{s}	−53° 26′ 23.4″	5.46	−0.24	451	B5V	in IC 2391; β Cep variable, V_{max} = 5.46^{m}, V_{min} = 5.52^{m}, P = 0.26 d
HD 75630	h		75630	43325	08^{h} 49^{m} 39.17^{s}	−40° 19′ 12.6″	5.47	−2.97	1590	A2/A3IV	
HX Vel		HX	74455	42712	08^{h} 42^{m} 16.20^{s}	−48° 05′ 56.8″	5.48	−3.09	1689	B1.5Vn	rotating ellipsoidal variable, V_{max} = 5.48^{m}, V_{min} = 5.53^{m}, P = 1.12 d
KT Vel		KT	74535	42715	08^{h} 42^{m} 19.02^{s}	−53° 06′ 00.4″	5.49	−0.36	483	B8...	in IC 2391; α² CVn variable, V_{max} = 5.49^{m}, V_{min} = 5.56^{m}, P = 3.38 d
HD 83548	y		83548	47267	09^{h} 38^{m} 01.43^{s}	−43° 11′ 27.1″	5.51	−0.35	484	G8II	
HD 69194			69194	40282	08^{h} 13^{m} 34.23^{s}	−50° 11′ 45.8″	5.51	−1.29	753	M1III	semiregular variable, ΔV = 0.07^{m}
HD 74196			74196	42535	08^{h} 40^{m} 17.49^{s}	−53° 00′ 55.6″	5.56	−0.24	472	B7Vn	in IC 2391; suspected β Cep variable, V_{max} = 5.56^{m}, V_{min} = 5.62^{m}
HR 3600		IZ	77475	44299	09^{h} 01^{m} 20.88^{s}	−41° 51′ 51.4″	5.56	−0.24	471	B5V	slowly pulsating B star, V_{max} = 5.53^{m}, V_{min} = 5.56^{m}
KL Vel		KL	79416	45189	09^{h} 12^{m} 30.54^{s}	−43° 36′ 47.9″	5.56	−0.85	623	B8V	slowly pulsating B star, V_{max} = 5.56^{m}, V_{min} = 5.57^{m}, P = 2.91 d
HD 81034			81034	45924	09^{h} 21^{m} 50.94^{s}	−42° 11′ 41.1″	5.56	−0.63	565	M3Ib	semiregular variable
HD 84461	O		84461	47717	09^{h} 43^{m} 42.30^{s}	−53° 53′ 28.9″	5.56	0.38	355	A0V	
HD 84816			84816	47963	09^{h} 46^{m} 30.38^{s}	−44° 45′ 18.2″	5.58	−2.64	1436	B2.5IV	suspected variable
HD 90677			90677	51140	10^{h} 26^{m} 48.93^{s}	−54° 52′ 38.3″	5.58	−2.87	1598	K3II/III	variable star, ΔV = 0.008^{m}, P = 2.95 d
HD 89062			89062	50241	10^{h} 15^{m} 31.55^{s}	−43° 06′ 44.1″	5.59	−0.52	544	K4III	
HD 81157			81157	45920	09^{h} 21^{m} 50.11^{s}	−55° 30′ 53.5″	5.61	0.98	275	A3IVs...	variable star, ΔV = 0.005^{m}, P = 0.090 d
HD 85563			85563	48348	09^{h} 51^{m} 19.76^{s}	−46° 11′ 38.2″	5.62	0.56	335	K2III	
NN Vel		NN	68161	39919	08^{h} 09^{m} 09.51^{s}	−48° 41′ 03.9″	5.66	−1.47	869	B8Ib/II	α Cyg variable
HD 89736			89736	50609	10^{h} 20^{m} 16.72^{s}	−47° 41′ 56.8″	5.66	−3.93	2694	K5/M0III	suspected variable
HD 74167			74167	42564	08^{h} 40^{m} 35.26^{s}	−45° 11′ 28.0″	5.67	−1.65	950	M0III	variable star, ΔV = 0.013^{m}, P = 2.43 d
HD 96113			96113	54137	11^{h} 04^{m} 31.30^{s}	−47° 40′ 45.1″	5.67	1.01	279	A8III/IV	
HD 72737			72737	41861	08^{h} 32^{m} 04.97^{s}	−53° 12′ 43.1″	5.68	−1.56	913	G8III+...	
HD 76653			76653	43797	08^{h} 55^{m} 11.76^{s}	−54° 57′ 56.0″	5.70	3.79	79	F6V	
HD 75276			75276	43148	08^{h} 47^{m} 18.85^{s}	−46° 09′ 19.5″	5.71	−4.52	3622	F0Ib	
HD 86087			86087	48613	09^{h} 54^{m} 51.26^{s}	−50° 14′ 38.3″	5.71	0.76	319	A0V	
HD 85483			85483	48287	09^{h} 50^{m} 41.97^{s}	−46° 56′ 02.4″	5.72	−0.59	597	K0IIICN...	suspected variable
HD 85980			85980	48561	09^{h} 54^{m} 17.67^{s}	−45° 17′ 00.7″	5.72	−1.35	845	B+...	
HD 81136			81136	45962	09^{h} 22^{m} 24.00^{s}	−46° 02′ 51.0″	5.74	−0.47	570	G6/G8III	suspected variable, V_{max} = 5.72^{m}, V_{min} = 5.77^{m}
HD 91355	s		91355	51561	10^{h} 31^{m} 57.45^{s}	−45° 04′ 00.2″	5.76	0.00	463	B9	suspected variable, V_{max} = 5.75^{m}, V_{min} = 5.78^{m}
AH Vel		AH	68808	40155	08^{h} 11^{m} 59.97^{s}	−46° 38′ 39.7″	5.76	−2.50	1462	F7p	classical Cepheid, V_{max} = 5.5^{m}, V_{min} = 5.89^{m}, P = 4.23 d
HD 79275			79275	45122	09^{h} 11^{m} 33.39^{s}	−46° 35′ 02.1″	5.78	−1.95	1144	B2IV-V	
HD 88842			88842	50078	10^{h} 13^{m} 28.04^{s}	−51° 45′ 20.9″	5.78	0.83	318	A3IV/V	
HR 3413	E	HV	73340	42177	08^{h} 35^{m} 52.04^{s}	−50° 58′ 10.8″	5.79	0.01	466	B8 Si	rapidly oscillating Ap star, V_{max} = 5.77^{m}, V_{min} = 5.81^{m}, P = 2.67 d
HD 76110			76110	43603	08^{h} 52^{m} 48.02^{s}	−38° 43′ 26.9″	5.79	−1.36	876	K5/M0III	suspected variable
HD 89569			89569	50493	10^{h} 18^{m} 38.16^{s}	−56° 06′ 38.4″	5.80	3.03	117	F6V	suspected variable
HD 95347			95347	53762	10^{h} 59^{m} 59.43^{s}	−43° 48′ 25.7″	5.81	1.07	290	B8/B9V	
HD 72067			72067	41621	08^{h} 29^{m} 07.57^{s}	−44° 09′ 37.6″	5.82	−2.63	1598	B2V	suspected variable, V_{max} = 5.75^{m}, V_{min} = 5.90^{m}
HD 68657			68657	40077	08^{h} 11^{m} 10.80^{s}	−48° 27′ 43.2″	5.83	−0.91	728	B3V	suspected variable
LR Vel		LR	80558	45675	09^{h} 18^{m} 42.36^{s}	−51° 33′ 38.4″	5.83	−4.77	4200	B7Iab	α Cyg variable, V_{max} = 5.82^{m}, V_{min} = 5.96^{m}, P = 1.69 d
HD 79694			79694	45314	09^{h} 14^{m} 08.23^{s}	−44° 08′ 45.1″	5.85	−0.17	521	B6IV	suspected variable, V_{max} = 5.80^{m}, V_{min} = 5.85^{m}
HD 79807	k^{1}		79807	45386	09^{h} 14^{m} 57.17^{s}	−37° 36′ 08.5″	5.85	−0.57	627	K0/K1III+..	
HD 69302			69302	40357	08^{h} 14^{m} 23.88^{s}	−45° 50′ 04.4″	5.86	−1.35	903	B2IV-V	
HD 77020			77020	44024	08^{h} 57^{m} 55.57^{s}	−48° 34′ 22.6″	5.88	−1.71	1072	G8/K0II	
HD 71043			71043	41081	08^{h} 22^{m} 55.18^{s}	−52° 07′ 25.6″	5.89	1.57	238	A0V	
HD 74273			74273	42614	08^{h} 41^{m} 05.32^{s}	−48° 55′ 21.7″	5.90	−2.56	1606	B1.5V	
IW Vel		IW	94985	53530	10^{h} 57^{m} 07.88^{s}	−50° 45′ 54.2″	5.90	0.96	317	A7Vni	δ Sct variable, ΔV = 0.016^{m}, P = 0.15 d
HD 91437			91437	51610	10^{h} 32^{m} 33.62^{s}	−44° 37′ 06.4″	5.91	0.48	397	G6/G8III	
HD 72832			72832	42001	08^{h} 33^{m} 38.45^{s}	−38° 50′ 55.8″	5.92	−1.10	825	B5III	suspected variable
HD 76161			76161	43589	08^{h} 52^{m} 38.62^{s}	−48° 21′ 32.8″	5.92	−1.69	1087	B3Vn	
HD 79621			79621	45270	09^{h} 13^{m} 34.48^{s}	−47° 20′ 18.4″	5.92	−0.23	554	B9V	
V335 Vel		V335	85953	48527	09^{h} 53^{m} 50.11^{s}	−51° 08′ 48.2″	5.95	−2.64	1707	B2V	slowly pulsating B star, V_{max} = 5.93^{m}, V_{min} = 5.97^{m}, P = 3.76 d
HD 67249			67249	39527	08^{h} 04^{m} 42.41^{s}	−50° 35′ 25.4″	5.96	−2.14	1358	G5II	
HD 89461			89461	50480	10^{h} 18^{m} 28.27^{s}	−41° 40′ 06.6″	5.97	−0.17	551	B9V	
HD 72232			72232	41674	08^{h} 29^{m} 45.65^{s}	−46° 19′ 54.2″	5.98	−0.45	629	B7IV	variable star, ΔV = 0.006^{m}, P = 0.83 d
HD 88399			88399	49844	10^{h} 10^{m} 37.70^{s}	−41° 42′ 53.8″	5.98	1.81	223	K3III	
HD 84228			84228	47559	09^{h} 41^{m} 47.94^{s}	−55° 12′ 49.6″	5.99	−3.60	2694	B4V	suspected variable
HD 68895			68895	40183	08^{h} 12^{m} 30.80^{s}	−46° 15′ 51.5″	6.00	−0.68	706	B5V	
HD 75759			75759	43392	08^{h} 50^{m} 21.02^{s}	−42° 05′ 23.3″	6.00	−2.84	1906	O9V	
HD 80057			80057	45481	09^{h} 16^{m} 04.03^{s}	−44° 53′ 55.4″	6.02	−4.60	4347	A1Ib+...	suspected variable, V_{max} = 6.01^{m}, V_{min} = 6.05^{m}
IU Vel		IU	77320	44213	09^{h} 00^{m} 22.26^{s}	−43° 10′ 26.4″	6.04	−1.39	1000	B3Vne	γ Cas variable, V_{max} = 5.97^{m}, V_{min} = 6.08^{m}
HD 80774			80774	45814	09^{h} 20^{m} 29.68^{s}	−37° 34′ 53.9″	6.04	0.05	513	K3/K4III	
HD 91356			91356	51560	10^{h} 31^{m} 56.65^{s}	−45° 04′ 10.8″	6.04	0.21	477	B4	
HD 71722			71722	41373	08^{h} 26^{m} 25.24^{s}	−52° 48′ 27.0″	6.05	1.79	232	A0V	
HD 79241			79241	45127	09^{h} 11^{m} 40.95^{s}	−39° 15′ 31.9″	6.05	−1.92	1278	B5III	
HD 81471			81471	46093	09^{h} 23^{m} 59.34^{s}	−51° 44′ 13.5″	6.05	−5.17	5719	A7Iab	suspected α Cyg variable
HD 81411			81411	46114	09^{h} 24^{m} 16.28^{s}	−39° 25′ 31.6″	6.05	0.04	518	A6/A7III	
HD 85250			85250	48119	09^{h} 48^{m} 40.06^{s}	−56° 24′ 42.9″	6.05	1.01	332	K0III	
HD 86523			86523	48835	09^{h} 57^{m} 42.61^{s}	−48° 24′ 50.7″	6.06	−4.27	3791	B3V	
HD 91805			91805	51816	10^{h} 35^{m} 10.45^{s}	−43° 39′ 52.8″	6.09	−1.12	901	G8/K0II/III	
HD 78548			78548	44708	09^{h} 06^{m} 34.04^{s}	−55° 48′ 08.7″	6.10	−1.70	1185	B2IV-V	suspected variable
HD 90798			90798	51245	10^{h} 28^{m} 02.08^{s}	−49° 24′ 20.5″	6.10	−1.15	921	K4III	suspected variable, V_{max} = 6.08^{m}, V_{min} = 6.12^{m}
HD 92328			92328	52112	10^{h} 38^{m} 50.33^{s}	−42° 45′ 12.3″	6.10	−0.11	569	Am+...	
KQ Vel		KQ	94660	53379	10^{h} 55^{m} 01.04^{s}	−42° 15′ 03.9″	6.11	0.23	489	A0sp...	α² CVn variable, V_{max} = 6.1^{m}, V_{min} = 6.12^{m}
HD 87363			87363	49259	10^{h} 03^{m} 20.60^{s}	−46° 38′ 10.2″	6.11	1.29	300	A0V	
HD 96224			96224	54185	11^{h} 05^{m} 04.14^{s}	−49° 23′ 32.4″	6.11	0.12	514	B9V	
IV Vel		IV	86466	48799	09^{h} 57^{m} 10.95^{s}	−52° 38′ 19.7″	6.13	−3.98	3432	B3IV	β Cep variable
HD 90518			90518	51077	10^{h} 26^{m} 09.91^{s}	−42° 44′ 18.2″	6.13	1.09	332	K1III	
IP Vel		IP	84400	47694	09^{h} 43^{m} 27.60^{s}	−51° 13′ 41.4″	6.15	−1.96	1364	B6V	Algol variable
HD 95429			95429	53771	11^{h} 00^{m} 08.34^{s}	−51° 49′ 04.1″	6.15	2.26	195	A3III/IV	
HD 88693			88693	49994	10^{h} 12^{m} 22.97^{s}	−52° 09′ 48.1″	6.16	1.11	334	K2IIICN...	suspected variable
HD 89104			89104	50232	10^{h} 15^{m} 16.65^{s}	−54° 58′ 27.2″	6.16	−2.04	1424	B2IV-V	suspected variable
MX Vel		MX	67341	39584	08^{h} 05^{m} 20.31^{s}	−46° 58′ 42.3″	6.18	−2.68	1929	B3Vnp	Be star
HR 3831		IM	83368	47145	09^{h} 36^{m} 25.41^{s}	−48° 45′ 04.2″	6.18	1.88	236	F0p	rapidly oscillating Ap star
HD 83465			83465	47172	09^{h} 36^{m} 46.41^{s}	−52° 56′ 38.1″	6.18	0.80	388	K1III	
HD 90393			90393	51014	10^{h} 25^{m} 17.22^{s}	−42° 28′ 02.5″	6.18	−0.09	586	G8III	
HD 79091			79091	45002	09^{h} 09^{m} 57.15^{s}	−52° 04′ 58.8″	6.19	1.34	304	K1III	
HD 81780			81780	46297	09^{h} 26^{m} 28.45^{s}	−40° 30′ 06.2″	6.19	1.37	300	A7III	
HD 87152			87152	49137	10^{h} 01^{m} 40.73^{s}	−53° 21′ 50.8″	6.20	−2.03	1442	B2.5V	variable star, V_{max} = 6.18^{m}, V_{min} = 6.20^{m}, P = 3.79 d
HD 75081			75081	43073	08^{h} 46^{m} 23.77^{s}	−41° 07′ 31.4″	6.21	−0.51	720	B9V	
HD 81369			81369	46067	09^{h} 23^{m} 39.77^{s}	−46° 54′ 31.6″	6.21	−1.49	1128	B7III	
HD 87652			87652	49394	10^{h} 05^{m} 01.86^{s}	−51° 18′ 49.1″	6.23	0.17	532	B8/B9III	
HD 90170			90170	50903	10^{h} 23^{m} 40.71^{s}	−41° 57′ 11.6″	6.24	1.98	232	K0IV	
HD 72900			72900	41986	08^{h} 33^{m} 30.28^{s}	−46° 58′ 14.4″	6.25	−2.66	1976	K3III	
HD 77580			77580	44367	09^{h} 02^{m} 06.42^{s}	−39° 24′ 08.1″	6.25	1.05	357	K1IIICN...	
HD 79900			79900	45413	09^{h} 15^{m} 14.64^{s}	−45° 33′ 19.8″	6.25	−2.47	1811	B8V	
HR 3562		IY	76566	43807	08^{h} 55^{m} 19.21^{s}	−45° 02′ 30.1″	6.26	−1.03	934	B3IV	slowly pulsating B star, V_{max} = 6.23^{m}, V_{min} = 6.27^{m}
HD 79524			79524	45242	09^{h} 13^{m} 18.68^{s}	−42° 16′ 24.4″	6.27	0.48	469	K2III	
HD 81347			81347	46045	09^{h} 23^{m} 25.38^{s}	−48° 17′ 13.0″	6.27	−1.88	1393	B5V	suspected variable, V_{max} = 6.25^{m}, V_{min} = 6.29^{m}
HD 80781			80781	45742	09^{h} 19^{m} 32.49^{s}	−55° 11′ 11.4″	6.28	−3.83	3432	B5V	
HD 75466			75466	43195	08^{h} 48^{m} 00.24^{s}	−52° 51′ 00.7″	6.29	0.52	464	B8V	
HD 93453			93453	52709	10^{h} 46^{m} 37.14^{s}	−43° 11′ 33.1″	6.29	1.91	245	A4IV	
HD 72993			72993	42070	08^{h} 34^{m} 29.26^{s}	−37° 36′ 40.3″	6.30	−1.11	988	M0III	suspected variable, ΔV = 0.09^{m}
GY Vel		GY	89273	50332	10^{h} 16^{m} 40.17^{s}	−51° 12′ 16.8″	6.30	−0.41	715	M4/M5III	semiregular variable, V_{max} = 6.23^{m}, V_{min} = 6.5^{m}
HD 72350			72350	41737	08^{h} 30^{m} 39.24^{s}	−44° 44′ 14.4″	6.30	−2.88	2233	B4V	
HD 79523			79523	45259	09^{h} 13^{m} 25.82^{s}	−38° 36′ 59.2″	6.31	−0.40	715	A0V	
GK Vel		GK	81575	46194	09^{h} 25^{m} 07.89^{s}	−43° 58′ 36.1″	6.31	−0.61	789	M5III	semiregular variable, V_{max} = 6.26^{m}, V_{min} = 6.39^{m}, P = 120 d
HD 80435			80435	45603	09^{h} 17^{m} 42.31^{s}	−54° 29′ 41.5″	6.33	−0.65	811	K3III	
HD 67621			67621	39691	08^{h} 06^{m} 41.61^{s}	−48° 29′ 50.7″	6.34	−1.78	1370	B3III	
HD 72650			72650	41813	08^{h} 31^{m} 29.57^{s}	−54° 23′ 38.1″	6.34	0.45	491	K3III	
HD 75289			75289	43177	08^{h} 47^{m} 40.41^{s}	−41° 44′ 10.5″	6.35	4.04	94	G0V	has a planet (b)
HD 72798			72798	41941	08^{h} 33^{m} 01.87^{s}	−45° 45′ 10.5″	6.36	−3.02	2451	B5III	
HD 76004			76004	43520	08^{h} 51^{m} 50.05^{s}	−44° 09′ 03.4″	6.38	−1.60	1283	B3V	
HZ Vel		HZ	75654	43354	08^{h} 49^{m} 52.40^{s}	−39° 08′ 30.1″	6.39	1.93	254	A5III	δ Sct variable, ΔV = 0.025^{m}, P = 0.087 d
HD 72485			72485	41781	08^{h} 31^{m} 10.64^{s}	−47° 51′ 59.9″	6.39	−1.15	1052	B2.5V	
HD 76230			76230	43593	08^{h} 52^{m} 40.83^{s}	−52° 07′ 44.2″	6.39	0.67	453	A0V	
HD 77907			77907	44423	09^{h} 03^{m} 05.35^{s}	−53° 33′ 01.4″	6.39	−0.72	862	B6V	
HD 86211			86211	48706	09^{h} 56^{m} 05.35^{s}	−40° 49′ 28.2″	6.39	−0.67	840	M1III	suspected variable
HD 86352			86352	48730	09^{h} 56^{m} 21.90^{s}	−51° 20′ 10.2″	6.39	−4.38	4657	B2IV-V	
HD 88015			88015	49619	10^{h} 07^{m} 35.73^{s}	−48° 15′ 39.0″	6.40	−1.60	1299	B3III	
HD 94724			94724	53411	10^{h} 55^{m} 27.25^{s}	−43° 01′ 14.0″	6.40	1.44	320	A0V	
HD 76304			76304	43673	08^{h} 53^{m} 50.76^{s}	−40° 26′ 51.2″	6.42	−1.61	1315	K0II/III+..	
HD 87122			87122	49092	10^{h} 01^{m} 12.01^{s}	−56° 05′ 47.6″	6.42	−0.70	867	B8	
HD 75387			75387	43209	08^{h} 48^{m} 08.79^{s}	−42° 27′ 48.5″	6.43	−2.15	1698	B2IV	suspected variable
HD 92155			92155	51984	10^{h} 37^{m} 16.12^{s}	−53° 51′ 19.0″	6.43	−2.10	1655	B3Vn	
HD 69596			69596	40433	08^{h} 15^{m} 23.27^{s}	−50° 26′ 57.1″	6.44	−0.32	734	K3/K4III	
HD 73121			73121	42123	08^{h} 35^{m} 12.48^{s}	−39° 58′ 14.0″	6.44	3.64	118	G1V	
HD 95509			95509	53811	11^{h} 00^{m} 36.33^{s}	−53° 06′ 42.7″	6.44	0.92	415	K3III	
HD 69404			69404	40397	08^{h} 14^{m} 51.25^{s}	−46° 29′ 09.3″	6.45	−1.60	1331	B3Vnne	γ Cas variable, V_{max} = 6.37^{m}, V_{min} = 6.46^{m}
HD 70309			70309	40749	08^{h} 19^{m} 05.60^{s}	−48° 11′ 52.4″	6.45	−0.56	823	B3V	
HD 73952			73952	42400	08^{h} 38^{m} 44.83^{s}	−53° 05′ 25.6″	6.45	0.50	505	B8Vn	in IC 2391
HD 94508			94508	53260	10^{h} 53^{m} 33.42^{s}	−56° 25′ 13.8″	6.45		4100	K2III	
HD 68478			68478	40016	08^{h} 10^{m} 20.57^{s}	−49° 14′ 14.5″	6.46	−2.03	1630	B3IV	
HD 78005			78005	44509	09^{h} 04^{m} 05.79^{s}	−47° 26′ 29.3″	6.46	−1.27	1144	B4V	suspected variable
HD 81309			81309	46075	09^{h} 23^{m} 44.92^{s}	−37° 45′ 25.1″	6.47	1.45	329	A1m...	
QZ Vel		QZ	85871	48469	09^{h} 53^{m} 00.11^{s}	−55° 22′ 23.6″	6.48	−3.06	2650	B1IIIn	slowly pulsating B star
HD 68763			68763	40160	08^{h} 12^{m} 06.06^{s}	−43° 24′ 01.6″	6.48	−5.11	6792	K3III:	suspected variable
HD 72787			72787	41970	08^{h} 33^{m} 19.87^{s}	−38° 22′ 14.5″	6.48	−1.63	1364	B2/B3V	suspected variable
HD 79025			79025	44979	09^{h} 09^{m} 45.00^{s}	−49° 25′ 27.5″	6.48	0.49	513	A9Vn	
HD 88862			88862	50069	10^{h} 13^{m} 22.32^{s}	−56° 35′ 12.1″	6.48	−0.53	821	K2III	
HD 89328			89328	50391	10^{h} 17^{m} 20.20^{s}	−46° 50′ 05.8″	6.48	2.51	203	A8V+...	
V361 Vel		V361	95716	53940	11^{h} 02^{m} 13.84^{s}	−41° 06′ 50.6″	6.48	−2.18	1762	M4III	semiregular variable, V_{max} = 6.17^{m}, V_{min} = 6.88^{m}, P = 64.9 d
HD 69168			69168	40299	08^{h} 13^{m} 45.66^{s}	−46° 34′ 43.3″	6.49	−0.96	1009	B3V	
HD 71805			71805	41426	08^{h} 26^{m} 57.83^{s}	−52° 42′ 17.4″	6.49	2.82	176	F5V...	
HD 72752			72752	41905	08^{h} 32^{m} 40.51^{s}	−47° 02′ 31.7″	6.49	−0.01	651	K2III	
HD 75989			75989	43528	08^{h} 51^{m} 55.60^{s}	−40° 59′ 11.8″	6.49	−1.18	1113	Ap...	
HD 87030			87030	49052	10^{h} 00^{m} 34.58^{s}	−56° 56′ 46.2″	6.50	0.52	511	K0III	
HD 87816		R	87816	49477	10^{h} 06^{m} 07.26^{s}	−52° 11′ 16.7″	6.51	1.09	394	K0III	suspected variable, V_{max} = 6.49^{m}, V_{min} = 6.52^{m}
HD 72436			72436	41806	08^{h} 31^{m} 24.70^{s}	−39° 03′ 50.9″	6.52	−1.80	1500	B5V	suspected variable
CV Vel		CV	77464	44245	09^{h} 00^{m} 37.99^{s}	−51° 33′ 20.1″	6.69		1430	B2V+...	Algol variable, V_{max} = 6.69^{m}, V_{min} = 7.19^{m}, P = 6.89 d
AI Vel		AI	69213	40330	08^{h} 14^{m} 05.15^{s}	−44° 34′ 32.8″	6.70		319	A9IV/V	double-mode δ Sct variable, V_{max} = 6.15^{m}, V_{min} = 6.76^{m}, P = 0.11 d
KK Vel		KK	78616	44790	09^{h} 07^{m} 42.52^{s}	−44° 37′ 56.8″	6.79		1650	B2II/III	β Cep variable
Vela X-1		GP	77581	44368	09^{h} 02^{m} 06.86^{s}	−40° 33′ 16.9″	6.87		3500	B0.5Iae	X-ray pulsar system and eclipsing binary, V_{max} = 6.76^{m}, V_{min} = 6.99^{m}, P = 8.96 d
HD 72754		FY	72754	41882	08^{h} 32^{m} 23.38^{s}	−49° 36′ 04.8″	6.90		2160	B2Ia:pshe	β Lyr variable, V_{max} = 6.84^{m}, V_{min} = 7.06^{m}, P = 33.72 d
RZ Vel		RZ	73502	42257	08^{h} 37^{m} 01.30^{s}	−44° 06′ 52.8″	7.13		1770	G1Ib	classical Cepheid, V_{max} = 6.42^{m}, V_{min} = 7.64^{m}, P = 20.40 d
HD 73882		NX	73882	42433	08^{h} 39^{m} 09.53^{s}	−40° 25′ 09.3″	7.19		1500	O9III	Algol variable, V_{max} = 7.19^{m}, V_{min} = 7.29^{m}, P = 2.92 d
V342 Vel		V342	89767	50598	10^{h} 20^{m} 11.74^{s}	−52° 36′ 06.2″	7.23	−6.4	6000	B0Iab	α Cyg variable, V_{max} = 7.16^{m}, V_{min} = 7.25^{m}
HD 93385			93385	52676	10^{h} 46^{m} 15^{s}	−41° 27′ 52″	7.49		138	G2V	has two planets (b & c)
HD 76534		OU	76534	43792	08^{h} 55^{m} 08.71^{s}	−43° 27′ 59.9″	7.50		3200	B2Vne	Be star
IGR J08408-4503		LM	74194	42587	08^{h} 40^{m} 47.79^{s}	−45° 03′ 30.2″	7.55			O8Ib(f)	recurrent X-ray transient and α Cyg variable, V_{max} = 7.54^{m}, V_{min} = 7.57^{m}, P = 7.81 d
HD 74438					08^{h} 38^{m} 9^{s}	−52° 42′ 0″	7.58		500	A3	Quadruple star, consists of two binary stars, orbiting their barycenter.
HD 85512			85512	48331	09^{h} 51^{m} 07^{s}	−43° 30′ 10″	7.67		36	K5V	has a planet (b)
HD 80077		PV	80077	45467	09^{h} 15^{m} 54.79^{s}	−49° 58′ 24.6″	7.68			B2Ia+e	possibly in Pismis 11; luminous blue variable, V_{max} = 7.42^{m}, V_{min} = 7.68^{m}
T Vel		T	73678	42321	08^{h} 37^{m} 40.83^{s}	−47° 21′ 43.1″	7.68		7100	G0II	classical Cepheid, V_{max} = 7.68^{m}, V_{min} = 8.34^{m}, P = 4.64 d
S Vel		S	82829	46881	09^{h} 33^{m} 13.20^{s}	−45° 12′ 30.9″	7.81		512	A5m	Algol variable, V_{max} = 7.74^{m}, V_{min} = 9.5^{m}, P = 5.93 d
SV Vel		SV	93247	52570	10^{h} 44^{m} 56.35^{s}	−56° 17′ 22.4″	7.91			F7II	classical Cepheid, V_{max} = 7.91^{m}, V_{min} = 9.12^{m}, P = 14.10 d
AX Vel		AX	68556		08^{h} 10^{m} 49.32^{s}	−47° 41′ 54.8″	8.16			F6II	double-mode Cepheid variable, V_{max} = 7.93^{m}, V_{min} = 8.48^{m}, P = 2.59 d
HD 83443			83443	47202	09^{h} 37^{m} 11.83^{s}	−43° 16′ 19.9″	8.24	5.05	142	K0V	Kalausi, has a planet (b)
W Vel		W	299011	50230	10^{h} 15^{m} 14.83^{s}	−54° 28′ 42.0″	8.30		967	M8IIIe	Mira variable, V_{max} = 8.2^{m}, V_{min} = 14.4^{m}, P = 395 d
SW Vel		SW	74712	42831	08^{h} 43^{m} 38.69^{s}	−47° 24′ 11.2″	8.32		5300	F9Ib	classical Cepheid, V_{max} = 7.49^{m}, V_{min} = 8.75^{m}, P = 23.41 d
SX Vel		SX	74884	42926	08^{h} 44^{m} 53.47^{s}	−46° 20′ 34.8″	8.33		3050	F8II	classical Cepheid, V_{max} = 7.92^{m}, V_{min} = 8.72^{m}, P = 9.55 d
HD 85390			85390	48235	09^{h} 50^{m} 02.0^{s}	−49° 47′ 25″	8.54	5.90	111	K1V	Natasha, has two planets (b & c)
HD 95338			95338	53719	10^{h} 59^{m} 26.3^{s}	−45° 39′ 33.1″	8.62	5.72	120.79	K0.5V	has a transiting planet (b)
AL Vel		AL		41784	08^{h} 31^{m} 11.28^{s}	−47° 39′ 57.4″	8.65			K0III+A3III/V	Algol variable, V_{max} = 8.6^{m}, V_{min} = 8.93^{m}, P = 96.11 d
WY Vel		WY	81137		09^{h} 21^{m} 59.19^{s}	−52° 33′ 51.8″	8.80			M2pe	Z And variable, V_{max} = 7.50^{m}, V_{min} = 9.1^{m}
HD 73526			73526	42282	08^{h} 37^{m} 16.48^{s}	−41° 19′ 08.8″	9.00	4.12	309	G6V	has two planets (b & c)
IRAS 08544-4431		V390			08^{h} 56^{m} 14.19^{s}	−44° 43′ 10.8″	9.18		2600	F3e	post-AGB star; semiregular variable, V_{max} = 9.01^{m}, V_{min} = 9.27^{m}, P = 94.73 d
AO Vel		AO	68826		08^{h} 11^{m} 53.91^{s}	−48° 44′ 46.0″	9.37			B9III	trinary star; Algol variable V_{max} = 9.35^{m}, V_{min} = 9.79^{m}, P = 1.58 d
AP Vel		AP		42492	08^{h} 39^{m} 45.76^{s}	−43° 51′ 39.2″	10.16		4600	F9	double-mode Cepheid variable, V_{max} = 9.49^{m}, V_{min} = 10.48^{m}, P = 3.13 d
AF Vel		AF		53213	10^{h} 53^{m} 02.49^{s}	−49° 54′ 22.7″	10.69		2250	F2.5	RR Lyr variable, V_{max} = 10.68^{m}, V_{min} = 11.78^{m}, P = 0.53 d
WR 12		V378			08^{h} 44^{m} 47.29^{s}	−45° 58′ 55.5″	10.78			WN8h+?	Algol variable, ΔV = 0.12^{m}
CS Vel		CS			09^{h} 41^{m} 10.26^{s}	−53° 48′ 57.8″	11.24				in Ruprecht 79; classical Cepheid, V_{max} = 11.24^{m}, V_{min} = 12.21^{m}, P = 5.90 d
LSS 2018		KV			10^{h} 54^{m} 40.57^{s}	−48° 47′ 02.9″	12.12			O	central star of DS 1; re-radiating spectroscopic binary, V_{max} = 11.78^{m}, V_{min} = 12.34^{m}, P = 0.36 d
WASP-19					09^{h} 53^{m} 40.08^{s}	−45° 39′ 33.1″	12.3	5.3	815	G8V	has a transiting planet (b)
GRS 1009-45		MM			10^{h} 13^{m} 36.38^{s}	−45° 04′ 32.0″	14.71			G5V-M0V	X-ray nova
V382 Vel		V382			10^{h} 44^{m} 48.39^{s}	−52° 25′ 30.7″	16.6				nova, V_{max} = 2.8^{m}, V_{min} = 16.6^{m}, P = 0.16 d
RX J0925.7-4758		MR			09^{h} 25^{m} 46.00^{s}	−47° 58′ 17.4″	16.98				close binary supersoft source, V_{max} = 16.98^{m}, V_{min} = 17.3^{m}, P = 4.03 d
CU Vel		CU			08^{h} 58^{m} 33.03^{s}	−41° 47′ 51.7″	17.0				SU UMa variable, V_{max} = 10.5^{m}, V_{min} = 17.0^{m}, P = 0.079 d
2S 0918-549					09^{h} 20^{m} 26.47^{s}	−55° 12′ 24.5″	21.0				low-mass X-ray binary
HH 46 IRS					08^{h} 25^{m} 43.85^{s}	−51° 00′ 32.6″					in HH 46; young stellar object
PSR B1055-52					10^{h} 57^{m} 58.84^{s}	−52° 26′ 56.3″					pulsar
PSR J0855-4644					08^{h} 55^{m} 36.18^{s}	−46° 44′ 13.4″					pulsar; possibly associated with the Vela supernova remnant
Vela Pulsar		HU			08^{h} 35^{m} 20.66^{s}	−45° 10′ 35.2″	23.6		959		pulsar; associated with the Vela supernova remnant
Luhman 16					10^{h} 49^{m} 18.92^{s}	−53° 19′ 10.1″			6.6	L7.5+T0.5	brown dwarf; one of the closest known systems
Table legend: • Name = Proper name • B = Bayer designation • F or/and G. = Flamsteed designation or Gould designation • Var = Variable-star designation • HD = Henry Draper Catalogue designation number • HIP = Hipparcos Catalogue designation number • RA = Right ascension for the Epoch/Equinox J2000.0 • Dec = Declination for the Epoch/Equinox J2000.0 • vis. mag. = visual magnitude (m or m_{v}), also known as apparent magnitude • abs. mag. = absolute magnitude (M_{v}) • Dist. (ly) = Distance in light-years from Earth • Sp. class = Spectral class of the star in the stellar classification system • Notes = Common name(s) or alternate name(s); comments; notable properties [for example: multiple star status, range of variability if it is a variable star, exoplanets, etc.]

== See also ==
- List of stars by constellation
