= A Velorum =

The Bayer designations a Velorum and A Velorum are distinct. Due to technical limitations, both designations link here. For the star

- a Velorum, see HD 75063
- A Velorum, see HD 72108
