= C Velorum =

The Bayer designations c Velorum and C Velorum are distinct. Due to technical limitations, both designations link here. For the star

- c Velorum, see HD 78004 (HR 3614)
- C Velorum, see HD 73155 (HR 3407)
