= Al Suhail =

Al Suhail is a traditional name that can be used to refer to several different stars:

- Canopus
- Gamma Velorum
- Lambda Velorum
