= FSR2007-1410 =

Open cluster in the Vela cluster

[FSR2007] 1410
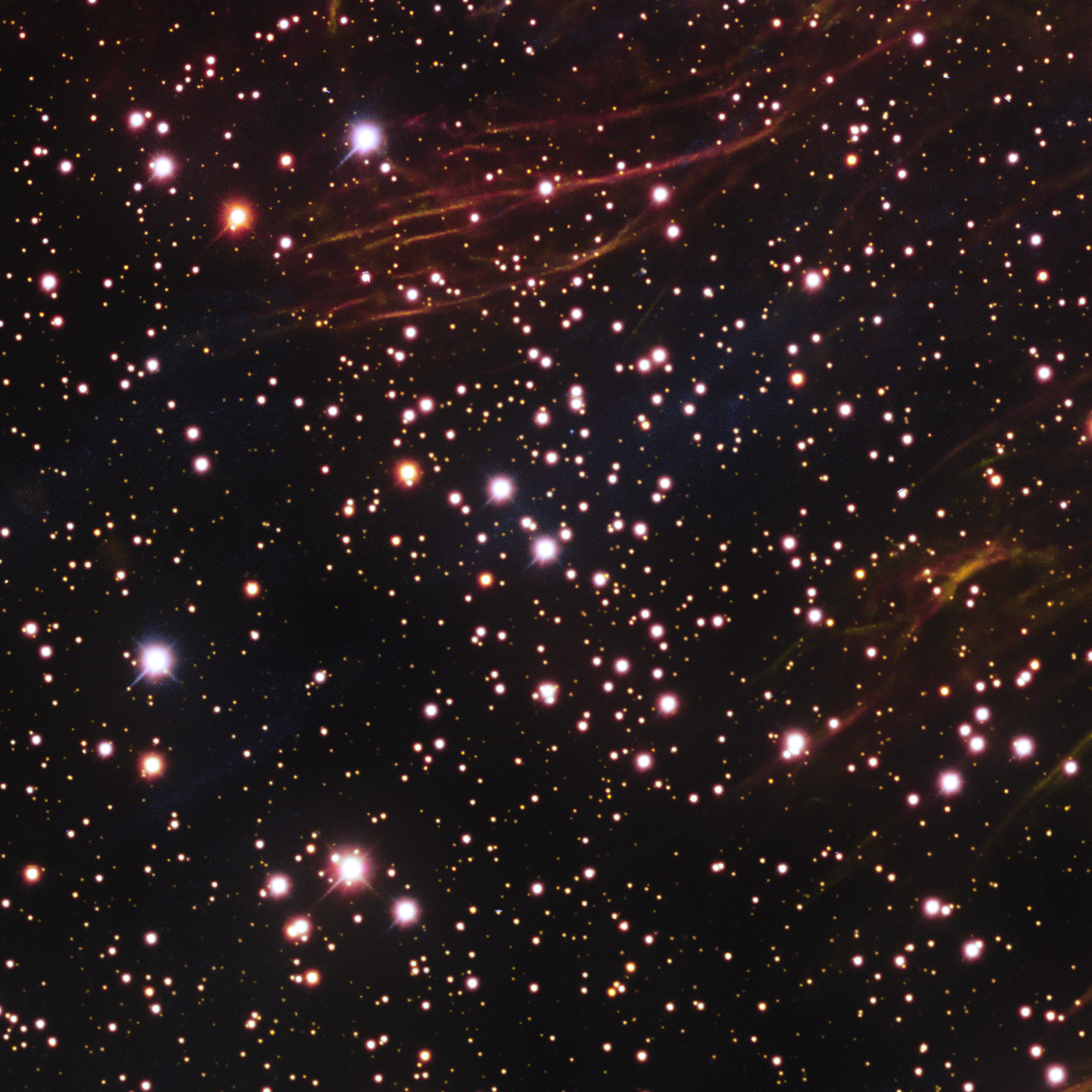
- Image of [FSR2007] 1410 from NOIRLab

Observation data
- Right ascension: 8 35 49.43
- Declination: -43° 36' 38.82"

Physical characteristics

Associations
- Constellation: Vela
- Galaxy: Milky Way

[FSR2007]-1410 is a loosely bound open star cluster located in the constellation of Vela.
