= HX Velorum =

Variable star in the constellation Vela

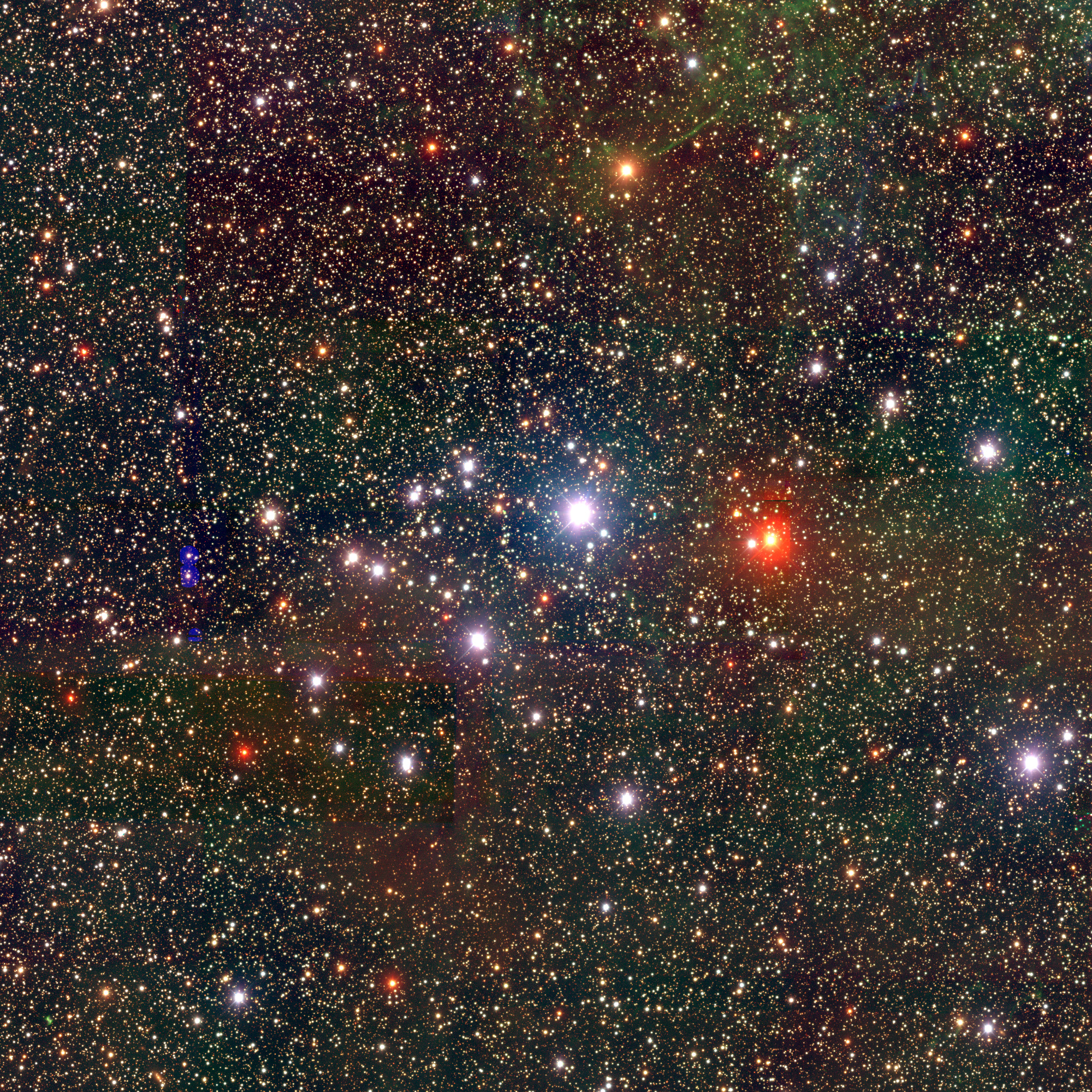
- HX Velorum is the brightest star in this image of IC 2395.

Observation data Epoch J2000 Equinox J2000
- Constellation: Vela
- Right ascension: 08^{h} 42^{m} 16.19252^{s}
- Declination: −48° 05′ 56.7481″
- Apparent magnitude (V): 5.48 - 5.53

Characteristics
- Spectral type: B1.5V
- U−B color index: −0.9
- B−V color index: −0.17
- Variable type: ELL

Astrometry
Radial velocity (R_{v})	27.1±0.7 km/s
Proper motion (μ)	RA: −3.714±0.128 mas/yr Dec.: 4.758±0.138 mas/yr
Parallax (π)	0.9479±0.1121 mas
Distance	2,990±150 ly (917±45 pc)
Absolute magnitude (M_{V})	−2.32

Orbit
Period (P)	1.124480(1) days
Semi-major axis (a)	13.6 R_{☉} (Note: from a sin i / sin(i), with a sin i = 4.8 R_{☉} and i = 20.6°.)
Eccentricity (e)	0.0
Inclination (i)	20.6±0.8°
Semi-amplitude (K_{1}) (primary)	83.3±0.6 km/s
Semi-amplitude (K_{2}) (secondary)	131.6±0.6 km/s

Details

Aa
Mass	16.30±0.03 M_{☉}
Radius	5.66±0.02 R_{☉}
Luminosity	29,700±610 L_{☉}
Surface gravity (log g)	4.08±0.03 cgs
Temperature	25,000±1,300 K
Metallicity	$\begin{smallmatrix}\left[\ce{M}/\ce{H}\right]\end{smallmatrix}$ = +0.083±0.025
Rotational velocity (v sin i)	130±3 km/s

Ab
Mass	10.32±0.04 M_{☉}
Radius	4.84±0.02 R_{☉}
Luminosity	6,170+590 −540 L_{☉}
Surface gravity (log g)	4.14±0.04 cgs
Temperature	22,000±640 K
Metallicity	$\begin{smallmatrix}\left[\ce{M}/\ce{H}\right]\end{smallmatrix}$ = +0.083±0.025
Rotational velocity (v sin i)	93±6 km/s

Other designations
- HD 74455, HR 3462, HIP 42712, SAO 220313

Database references
SIMBAD	data

HX Velorum, also known as HR 3462 and HD 74455, is a star in the constellation Vela. It is a 5th magnitude star, so it will be faintly visible to the naked eye of an observer far from city lights. It is a variable star, with its brightness varying slightly from magnitude 5.48 to 5.53 over a period of 1.12 days.

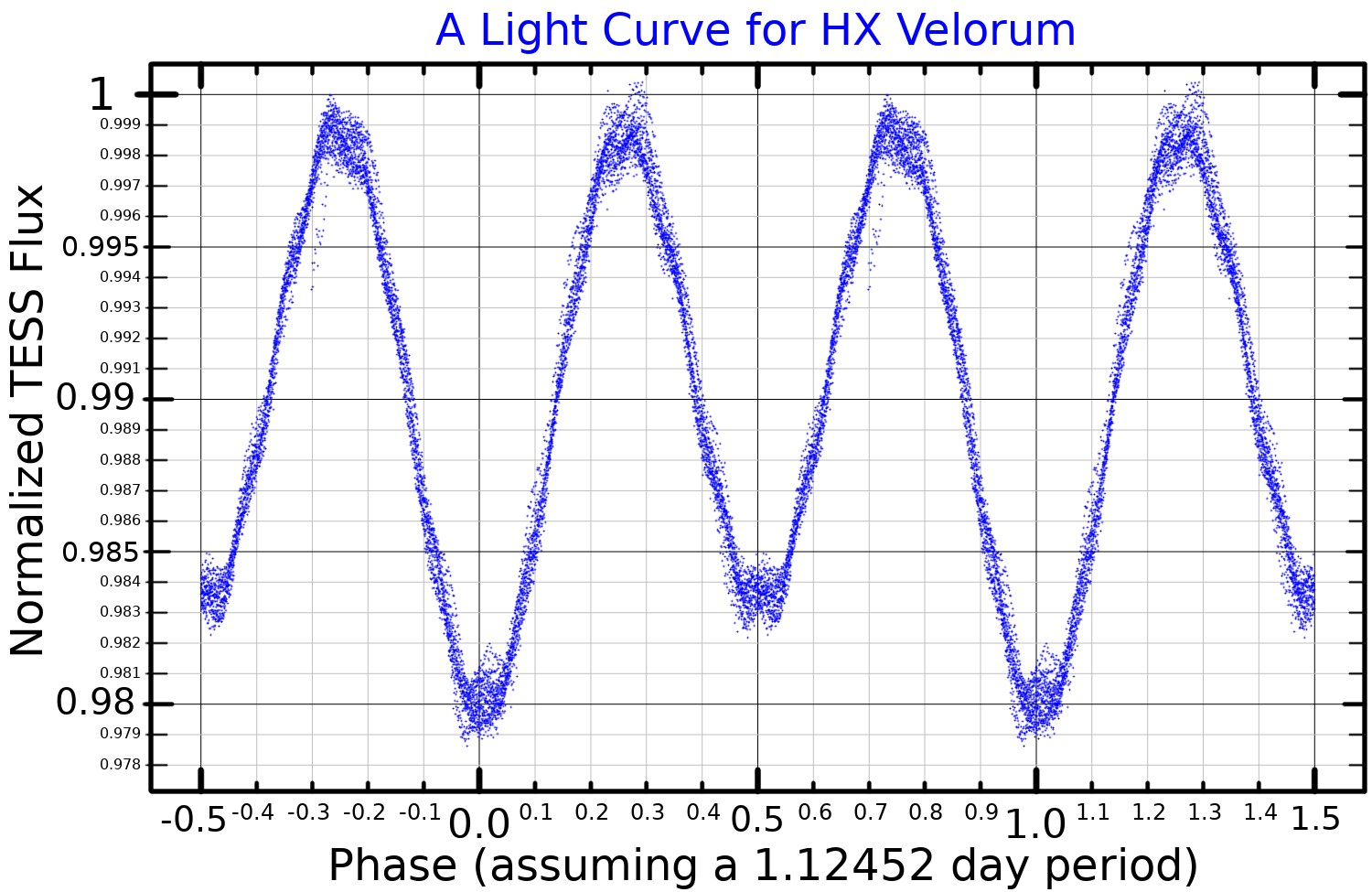
A light curve for HX Velorum, plotted from TESS data

In 1981, Robert Shobbrook announced that HR 3462 is a variable star based on observations made in 1976. He correctly classified it as an ellipsoidal variable, but the period he derived, 0.56205±0.00005 days, was half the actual orbital period because his data did not allow him to distinguish between primary and secondary minima in the light curve. It was given the variable star designation HX Velorum in 1980. In 1983, Christoffel Waelkens and Frédy Rufener published the correct period of variability, 1.124 days.

HX Velorum is a triple star, consisting of a pair (components A, magnitude 5.5, and B, magnitude 8.28) separated by 0.5 arc seconds. Component A is itself a close binary pair (components Aa and Ab). The system's brightness variation is caused by the ellipsoidal Aa and Ab components orbiting each other.

HX Velorum is only about 2 arc minutes from the center of IC 2395, so it appears to be within that cluster. However the Gaia DR3 dataset lists the parallax of HX Velorum as 0.9479±0.1121 mas, yielding a distance of 3,400+500
−300 light years, while the distance to IC 2395 has been estimated to be 4,560±200 light years, so HX Velorum might be a foreground object rather than a true cluster member. Mark Blackford et al. concluded HX Velorum is a member of the cluster, but that conclusion was based in part on earlier, significantly different distance estimates for both the star and the cluster.
