= NGC 3318 =

Galaxy in the constellation Vela

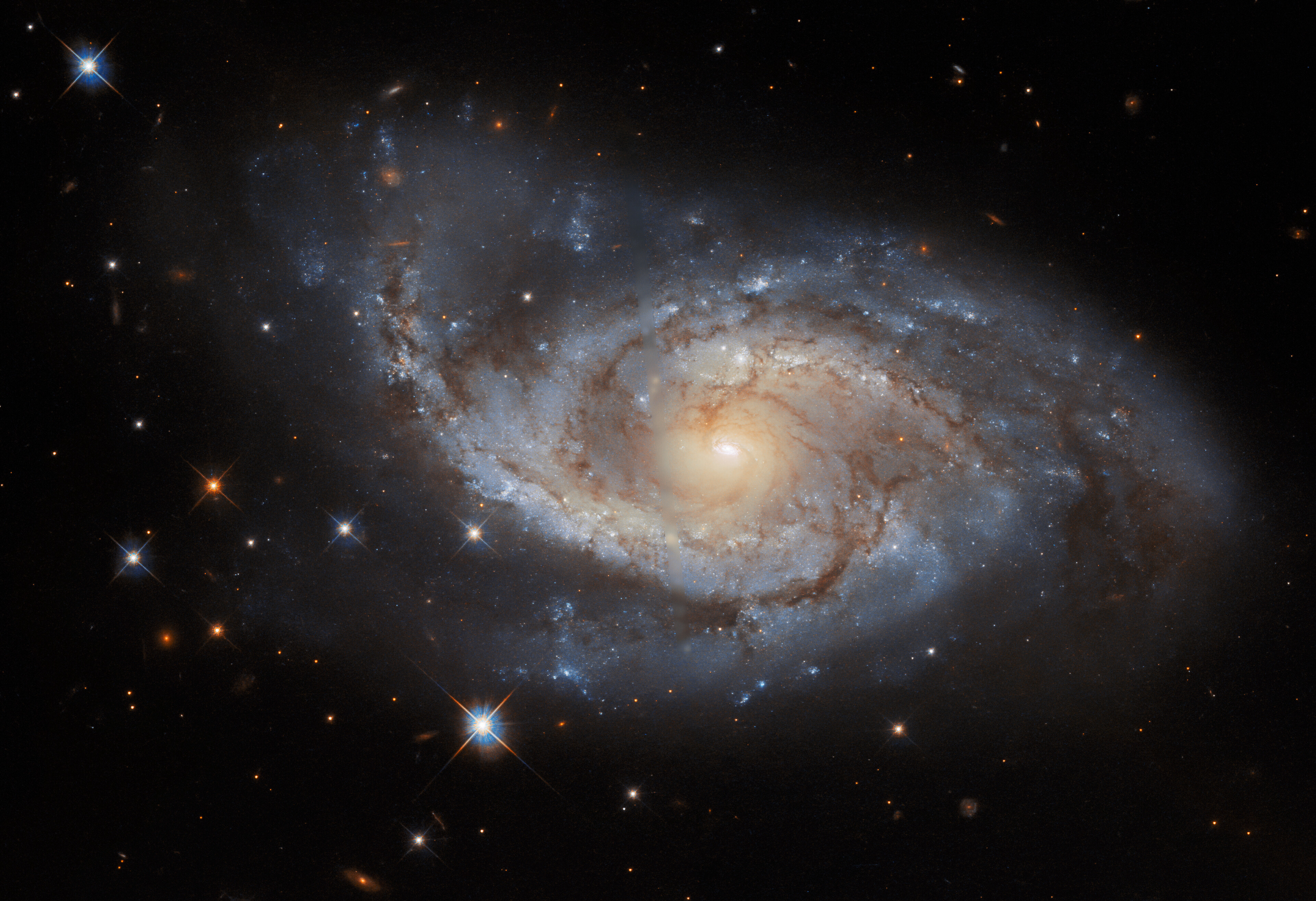
- NGC 3318 imaged by the Hubble Space Telescope

Observation data (J2000 epoch)
- Constellation: Vela
- Right ascension: 10^{h} 37^{m} 15.5036^{s}
- Declination: −41° 37′ 38.859″
- Redshift: 0.009255±0.000021
- Heliocentric radial velocity: 2,775±6 km/s
- Distance: 122.47 ± 2.40 Mly (37.550 ± 0.735 Mpc)
- Group or cluster: NGC 3318 group (LGG 199)
- Apparent magnitude (V): 12.19

Characteristics
- Type: SAB(rs)b
- Size: ~114,400 ly (35.09 kpc) (estimated)
- Apparent size (V): 2.4′ × 1.3′

Other designations
- ESO 317- G 052, IRAS 10350-4122, MCG -07-22-026, PGC 31533

NGC 3318 is a barred spiral galaxy in the constellation of Vela. Its velocity with respect to the cosmic microwave background is 3,077±22 km/s, which corresponds to a Hubble distance of 148.0 ± 10.4 Mly (45.38 ± 3.19 Mpc). However, 20 non-redshift measurements give a much closer mean distance of 122.47 ± 2.40 Mly (37.550 ± 0.735 Mpc). It was discovered by British astronomer John Herschel on 2 March 1835.

NGC 3318 is a Seyfert II galaxy, i.e. it has a quasar-like nucleus with very high surface brightnesses whose spectra reveal strong, high-ionisation emission lines, but unlike quasars, the host galaxy is clearly detectable.

== NGC 3318 group ==
NGC 3318 is part of a galaxy group that bears its name. The NGC 3318 group (also known as LGG 199) has at least 9 galaxies, including NGC 3250, NGC 3250E, NGC 3250B, NGC 3318B, ESO 317-17, ESO 317-19, ESO 317-21, and ESO 317-23.

== Supernovae ==
Three supernovae have been observed in NGC 3318:

- SN 2000cl (Type IIn, mag. 14.8) was discovered by French amateur astronomer Robin Chassagne (bio-fr) on 26 May 2000.
- SN 2017ahn (Type II, mag. 18.0896) was discovered by the Distance Less Than 40 Mpc Survey (DLT40) on 8 February 2017.
- SN 2020aze (Type II, mag. 17.1224) was discovered by DLT40 on 26 January 2020.

== See also ==
- List of NGC objects (3001–4000)
