= HD 89998 =

Star in the constellation Vela

- Location of HD 89998 (circled in red)

Observation data Epoch J2000 Equinox ICRS
- Constellation: Vela
- Right ascension: 10^{h} 22^{m} 19.58477^{s}
- Declination: −41° 38′ 59.8592″
- Apparent magnitude (V): 4.82

Characteristics
- Spectral type: K1 III
- B−V color index: 1.095±0.055

Astrometry
Radial velocity (R_{v})	+20.9±0.8 km/s
Proper motion (μ)	RA: −27.664 mas/yr Dec.: +60.090 mas/yr
Parallax (π)	15.9154±0.1375 mas
Distance	205 ± 2 ly (62.8 ± 0.5 pc)
Absolute magnitude (M_{V})	0.84

Details
Mass	1.9 M_{☉}
Radius	11.0 R_{☉}
Luminosity	56 L_{☉}
Surface gravity (log g)	2.77 cgs
Temperature	4,761 K
Metallicity [Fe/H]	+0.12 dex
Rotational velocity (v sin i)	<1.0 km/s

Other designations
- r Vel, NSV 4837, CD−41°5809, FK5 1268, HD 89998, HIP 50799, HR 4080, SAO 221998

Database references
SIMBAD	data

HD 89998 (r Velorum) is a single star in the southern constellation of Vela. It is a faint star but visible to the naked eye with an apparent visual magnitude of 4.82. The distance to HD 89998, as determined from its annual parallax shift of 15.9 mas, is 205 light years. The star is moving further from the Earth with a heliocentric radial velocity of +21 km/s, having come within 140 ly some 1.552 million years ago.

This is an evolved giant star with a stellar classification of K1 III. The measured angular diameter of this star, after correcting for limb darkening, is 1.72±0.02 mas. At the estimated distance of this star, this yields a physical size of 11.6 times the radius of the Sun. It is radiating 56 times the Sun's luminosity from its enlarged photosphere at en effective temperature of 4,761 K.
