= H.R. 3440 =

H.R. 3440 may refer to:

- DREAM Act of 2017 (House Resolution 3440)
- Public Law 109-253; House Resolution 3440; (U.S. 109th Congress in 2006), a law designating a post office in remembrance of José Celso Barbosa
- HW Velorum (HR 3440, HD 74071), a naked-eye visible star; a variable star in Vela, located in the star cluster IC 2391 (Omicron Velorum Cluster, C85)
