= GX Velorum =

Star in the constellation Vela

- Location of GX Velorum (circled)

Observation data Epoch J2000.0 Equinox J2000.0
- Constellation: Vela
- Right ascension: 09^{h} 11^{m} 04.39802^{s}
- Declination: −44° 52′ 04.4411″
- Apparent magnitude (V): +4.99 (4.97 to 5.04)

Characteristics
- Spectral type: B5 Ia
- U−B color index: −0.57
- B−V color index: +0.22
- Variable type: α Cyg?

Astrometry
Radial velocity (R_{v})	+28.2±0.8 km/s
Proper motion (μ)	RA: −5.608 mas/yr Dec.: +3.843 mas/yr
Parallax (π)	0.7696±0.1585 mas
Distance	approx. 4,200 ly (approx. 1,300 pc)
Absolute magnitude (M_{V})	−7.20

Details
Mass	35 M_{☉}
Radius	61±7 R_{☉}
Luminosity	214,000 L_{☉}
Surface gravity (log g)	2.12±0.05 cgs
Temperature	15,000±150 K
Rotational velocity (v sin i)	39 km/s
Age	8.3 Myr

Other designations
- GX Vel, CD−44°5206, HD 79186, HIP 45085, HR 3654, SAO 220928

Database references
SIMBAD	data

GX Velorum is a solitary variable star in the southern constellation of Vela. It is visible to the naked eye as a faint, blue-white hued star with an apparent visual magnitude that fluctuates around 4.99. Based upon parallax measurements, it is located approximately 4,200 light years distant from the Sun, and is drifting further away with a radial velocity of +28 km/s. It may be a member of the Vela OB1 association of co-moving stars.

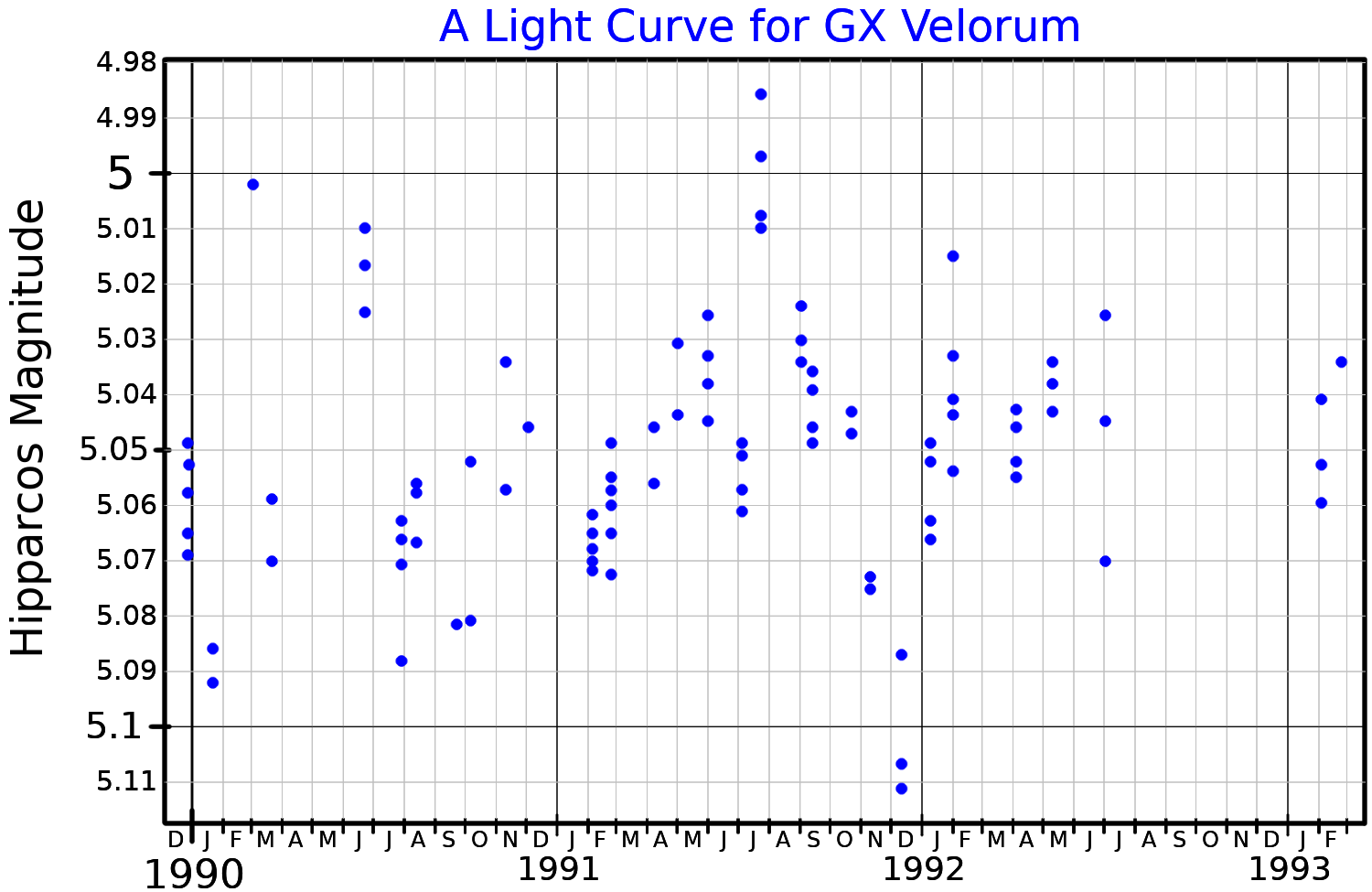
A light curve for GX Velorum, plotted from Hipparcos data

This object is a massive blue supergiant with a stellar classification of B5 Ia. It is suspected to be an Alpha Cygni-type pulsating variable and ranges in brightness from 4.97 down to 5.04 magnitude. It is losing mass at the rate of (0.40±0.02)×10^{−6} M_{☉} yr^{−1}, or one solar mass every 2.5 million years. The star is 8.3 million years old with 35 times the mass of the Sun. It has expanded to around 61 times the Sun's radius and is radiating 214,000 times the luminosity of the Sun from its enlarged photosphere at an effective temperature of 15,000 K.
