= IC 2395 =

Open cluster in the constellation Vela

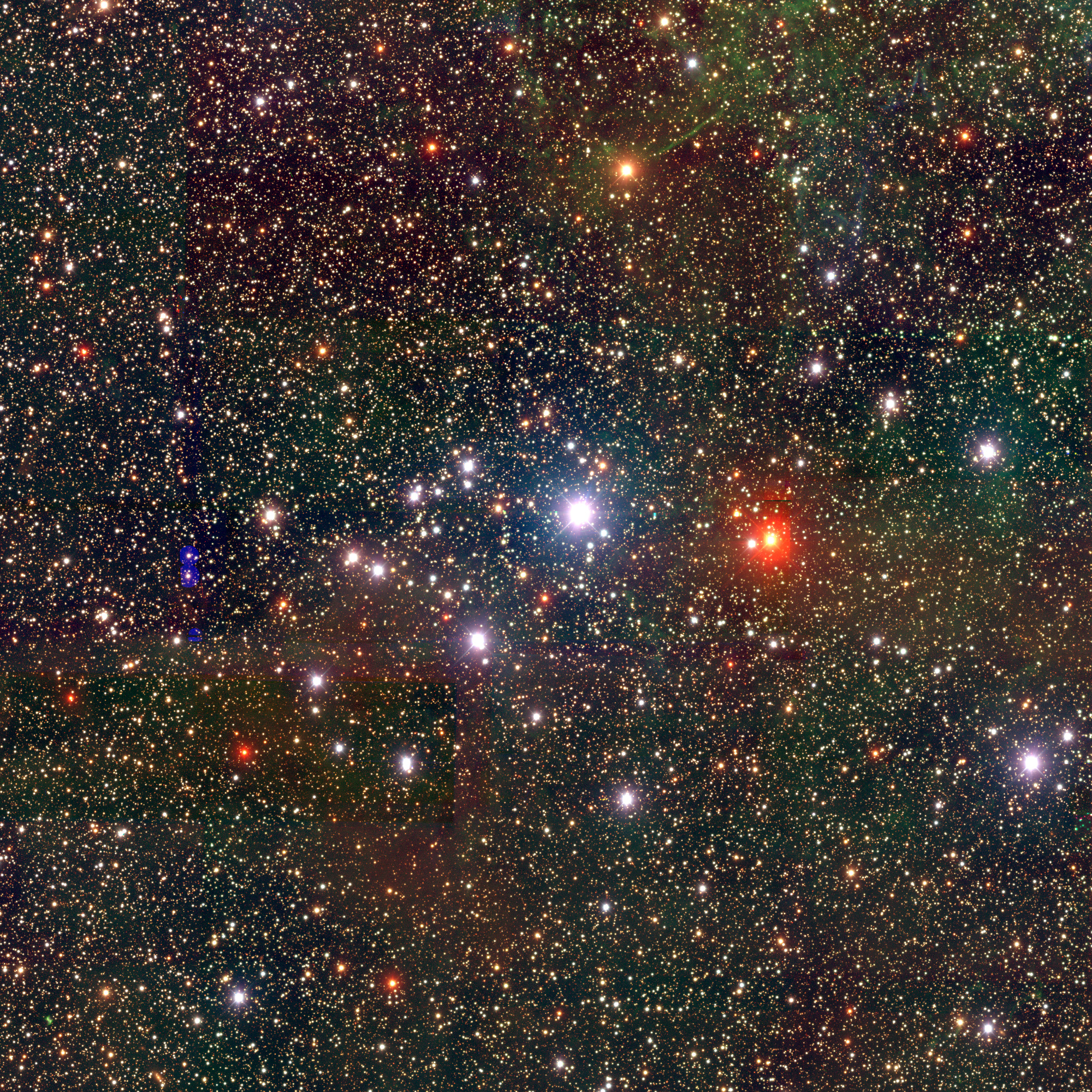
- Credit: legacy surveys

Observation data (J2000 epoch)
- Right ascension: 08^{h} 42^{m} 31^{s}
- Declination: −48° 06′ 00″
- Distance: 2,300 ly (705 pc)
- Apparent magnitude (V): 4.6
- Apparent dimensions (V): 8'

Physical characteristics
- Mass: 176 M_{☉}
- Estimated age: 17 million years
- Other designations: Cr 192, vdBH 47

Associations
- Constellation: Vela

IC 2395 is an open cluster in the constellation Vela.

== Observation history ==
It is possible that entry III.3 of the catalogue of Nicolas Louis de Lacaille, often listed as missing, is IC 2395. According to Lacaille's entry, the object consists of a "Star of 6th magnitude, connected to another more southern one by a nebulous trace", and gives the coordinates RA=08:42.2, Dec=-48:04. These coordinates are 2' west and 1' south of the location of van den Bergh-Hagen 47 according to Sky Catalogue 2000.0, which is within the cluster's diameter. Lacaille observed it on February 17, 1752.

The cluster was discovered independently in 1908 by Solon Irving Bailey. Sidney van den Bergh and Gretchen Luft Hagen catalogued also this cluster in 1975. The coordinates of vdBH 47 are in fair agreement with the coordinates of IC 2395, although because Lund placed IC 2395 in an inaccurate position, Sky Catalogue 2000.0, Deep Sky Field Guide and the first edition of Uranometria list two different clusters. The fact that they are the same cluster is also supported by Clariá et al. who estimated its angular diameter at 19 arcminutes.

== Characteristics ==
IC 2395 is an open cluster of poor to moderate richness. 45 stars located within the central part of the cluster are considered to be possible members. The core radius of the cluster is 0.53 parsecs (1.6 light years), while the tidal radius is 4.5 - 7.9 parsecs (15 - 26 light years) and represents the average outer limit of IC 2395, beyond which a star is unlikely to remain gravitationally bound to the cluster core. IC 2395 is a young stellar cluster being between 6 and 18 million years old. Based on its young age and distance, it is possible that IC 2395 is part of the Vela OB1C stellar association.

The brightest member of the cluster has mag 5.53, and its bluest main sequence star is of spectral type B5. One of the members of the cluster is a candidate Be star. One member, HD 74339 (mag. 9.3, spectral type B2/3 II/III), is a beta Cephei variable.
