= HD 77258 =

Binary star system in the constellation Vela

- Location of HD 77258 (circled in red)

Observation data Epoch J2000.0 Equinox ICRS
- Constellation: Vela
- Right ascension: 09^{h} 00^{m} 05.4104^{s}
- Declination: −41° 15′ 12.973″
- Apparent magnitude (V): 4.45

Characteristics
- Spectral type: G8-K1III + A7
- B−V color index: 0.75±0.02
- Variable type: Constant

Astrometry
Radial velocity (R_{v})	−7.4±4.1 km/s
Proper motion (μ)	RA: −42.227 mas/yr Dec.: 50.599 mas/yr
Parallax (π)	14.9687±0.2155 mas
Distance	218 ± 3 ly (66.8 ± 1.0 pc)
Absolute magnitude (M_{V})	0.40

Orbit
Period (P)	74.13715±0.00073 d
Semi-major axis (a)	≥ (2.0057±0.0004)×10^{7} km
Eccentricity (e)	0.00085±0.00019
Periastron epoch (T)	2453625.5112±0.0017 HJD
Argument of periastron (ω) (secondary)	106±13°
Semi-amplitude (K_{1}) (primary)	19.6744±0.0041 km/s

Details

A
Radius	7.97+0.66 −1.42 R_{☉}
Luminosity	68.769±1.152 L_{☉}
Temperature	5889+607 −232 K
Metallicity [Fe/H]	0.72±0.15 dex

Other designations
- w Vel, CD−40°4810, FK5 1234, HD 77258, HIP 44191, HR 3591, SAO 220730

Database references
SIMBAD	data

HD 77258 is a binary star system in the southern constellation of Vela. It has the Bayer designation w Velorum, while HD 77258 is the identifier from the Henry Draper Catalogue. The system is visible to the naked eye as a faint point of light with a combined apparent visual magnitude of 4.45. It is located at a distance of approximately 218 light years from the Sun based on parallax. The radial velocity of the system barycenter is poorly constrained, but it appears to be drifting away at a rate of ~7 km/s.

The radial velocity variation of this system was first reported by H. K. Palmer in 1904. It is a single-lined spectroscopic binary with an orbital period of 74.14 days and an eccentricity (ovalness) of 0.00085, indicating the orbit is essentially circular. The visible component has a stellar classification of G8-K1III, matching a late G-type giant star. This is an evolved star that has exhausted the supply of hydrogen at its core, then cooled and expanded away from the main sequence. In 1975, S. Maladora flagged the spectrum as peculiar.

The level of ultraviolet flux coming from this system suggests the companion is a hot A-type star of class A6.5 or A7. The system is a source of X-ray emission.
