= PSR J0855−4644 =

Radio pulsar in the constellation Vela

Observation data Epoch {{{epoch}}} Equinox
- Constellation: Vela
- Right ascension: 08^{h} 55^{m} 36.18^{s}
- Declination: −46° 44′ 13.4″

Characteristics
- Spectral type: Pulsar

Astrometry
Distance	815 ly (250 pc)

Details
Rotation	64.6861308252 ms
Age	141,000 years

Other designations
- PSR J0855−4644

Database references
SIMBAD	data

PSR J0855−4644 is a pulsar in the constellation Vela, and was at one time thought possibly associated with supernova remnant RX J0852.0−4622. However, this association is considered unlikely since a central compact object with better matching kinematics to the shell has been observed. It rotates every 64.686 milliseconds and is characteristic age of 141,000 years old.
