= HD 75710 =

Star in the constellation Vela

- Location of HD 75710 (circled in red)

Observation data Epoch J2000 Equinox ICRS
- Constellation: Vela
- Right ascension: 08^{h} 49^{m} 47.63746^{s}
- Declination: −45° 18′ 28.3346″
- Apparent magnitude (V): 4.94

Characteristics
- Spectral type: A2 III
- B−V color index: +0.043±0.003

Astrometry
| Radial velocity (R_{v}) | +5.0±7.4 km/s |
| Proper motion (μ) | RA: −11.490 mas/yr Dec.: +13.450 mas/yr |
| Parallax (π) | 2.7107±0.1660 mas |
| Distance | 1,200 ± 70 ly (370 ± 20 pc) |
| Absolute magnitude (M_{V}) | −2.71 |

Details
| Mass | 2.8 M_{☉} |
| Radius | 15 R_{☉} |
| Luminosity | 1,668 L_{☉} |
| Surface gravity (log g) | 3.38 cgs |
| Temperature | 9,456 K |
| Metallicity [Fe/H] | −1.03 dex |
| Rotational velocity (v sin i) | 110 km/s |

Other designations
- g Vel, CD−44°4861, FK5 2698, GC 12204, HD 75710, HIP 43347, HR 3520, SAO 220540, PPM 313660

Database references
| SIMBAD | data |

HD 75710 is a single star in the constellation of Vela. It has an apparent visual magnitude of approximately 4.94, which is bright enough to be faintly visible to the naked eye. Based upon an annual parallax shift of 2.7 mas, it is located about 1,200 light-years from the Sun.

The stellar classification of this star is A2 III, suggesting it is in the giant star stage of its stellar evolution. It has a high rate of spin with a projected rotational velocity of 110 km/s, which is giving the star an oblate shape with an equatorial bulge that is 7% larger than the polar radius. HD 75710 is radiating 1,668 times the Sun's luminosity from its photosphere at an effective temperature of 9,456 K.
