= HD 74272 =

Star in the constellation Vela

- Location of HD 74272 (circled in red)

Observation data Epoch J2000.0 Equinox ICRS
- Constellation: Vela
- Right ascension: 08^{h} 41^{m} 13.12966^{s}
- Declination: −47° 19′ 01.6610″
- Apparent magnitude (V): 4.74

Characteristics
- Spectral type: A5 II
- B−V color index: 0.137±0.029

Astrometry
Radial velocity (R_{v})	+17.4±2.8 km/s
Proper motion (μ)	RA: −8.228 mas/yr Dec.: +10.051 mas/yr
Parallax (π)	1.7639±0.1441 mas
Distance	1,800 ± 200 ly (570 ± 50 pc)
Absolute magnitude (M_{V})	−4.67

Details
Mass	8.8±0.1 M_{☉}
Radius	33.11+1.76 −0.82 R_{☉}
Luminosity	3,287±312 L_{☉}
Surface gravity (log g)	2.04±0.09 cgs
Temperature	7,370±74 K
Metallicity [Fe/H]	−0.46±0.05 dex
Rotational velocity (v sin i)	15.1±1.2 km/s
Age	29.8±3.4 Myr

Other designations
- n Vel, CD−46°4448, FK5 2570, HD 74272, HIP 42624, HR 3452, SAO 220284

Database references
SIMBAD	data

HD 74272 is a star in the constellation Vela. It has the Bayer designation n Velorum, while HD 74272 is the identifier from the Henry Draper catalogue. This is a white hued star that is faintly visible to the naked eye with an apparent visual magnitude of 4.74. It is located at a distance of approximately 1,800 light years from the Sun based on parallax. The star is drifting further away with a radial velocity of +17 km/s.

This is an aging, massive bright giant star with a stellar classification of A5 II. It is an estimated 30 million years old with 8.8 times the mass of the Sun. Having exhausted the supply of hydrogen at its core, it has expanded to around 33 times the radius of the Sun. The star is radiating 3,287 times the Sun's luminosity from its enlarged photosphere at an effective temperature of 7,370 K.
