= HD 85622 =

Binary star system in the constellation Vela

- Location of HD 85622 (circled in red)

Observation data Epoch J2000 Equinox J2000
- Constellation: Vela
- Right ascension: 09^{h} 51^{m} 40.66831^{s}
- Declination: −46° 32′ 51.4401″
- Apparent magnitude (V): 4.58

Characteristics
- Evolutionary stage: Supergiant
- Spectral type: G5 Ib or G6 IIa
- B−V color index: 1.20

Astrometry
Radial velocity (R_{v})	15.94±2.50 km/s
Proper motion (μ)	RA: −25.119 mas/yr Dec.: +10.305 mas/yr
Parallax (π)	3.6857±0.1289 mas
Distance	880 ± 30 ly (271 ± 9 pc)
Absolute magnitude (M_{V})	−2.96

Orbit
Period (P)	329.266±0.085 d
Eccentricity (e)	0 (adopted)
Periastron epoch (T)	2453860.281±0.074 HJD
Semi-amplitude (K_{1}) (primary)	13.021±0.012 km/s

Details
Mass	6.2±0.5 M_{☉}
Radius	62.6+2.5 −2.2 R_{☉}
Luminosity	1,602+109 −93 L_{☉}
Surface gravity (log g)	1.65 cgs
Temperature	4,761 K
Rotational velocity (v sin i)	19.3±1.0 km/s
Age	63.7±15.8 Myr

Other designations
- m Vel, CD−45°5508, HD 85622, HIP 48374, HR 3912, SAO 221553

Database references
SIMBAD	data

HD 85622 is a binary star system in the southern constellation of Vela. It is visible to the naked eye with an apparent visual magnitude of 4.58. The distance to HD 85622, as measured from its annual parallax shift of 3.6857 mas, is 880 light years. It is moving further from the Earth with a heliocentric radial velocity of +8 km/s.

This is a single-lined spectroscopic binary with a circular orbit and a period of 329.3 days. The a sin i value is 0.39 AU, where a is the semimajor axis and i is the orbital inclination to the line of sight. This value provides a lower bound on the actual semimajor axis. The system shows a micro-variability in its brightness, and is a source of X-ray emission with an apparent flux of 42.6×10^{−17} W/m^{2}.

The visible component is a supergiant star with a stellar classification of G5 Ib or G6 IIa. It is about 64 million years old with a projected rotational velocity of 19 km/s. The star has 6.2 times the mass of the Sun and is radiating 1,600 times the Sun's luminosity from its photosphere at an effective temperature of 4,761 K.
