= WY Velorum =

Binary star in the constellation Vela

- Location of WY Velorum (circled)

Observation data Epoch J2000 Equinox ICRS
- Constellation: Vela
- Right ascension: 09^{h} 21^{m} 59.13465^{s}
- Declination: −52° 33′ 51.6424″
- Apparent magnitude (V): 8.84–10.22

Characteristics
- Evolutionary stage: Red supergiant (A); Blue giant (B)
- Spectral type: M2 Ib pe + B2III
- B−V color index: +0.96
- J−H color index: +1.096
- J−K color index: +1.57
- Variable type: Irregular variable

Astrometry
Proper motion (μ)	RA: −6.313 mas/yr Dec.: 4.538 mas/yr
Parallax (π)	0.5187±0.0891 mas
Distance	1900 pc

Details

WY Velorum A
Radius	1,157 R_{☉}
Luminosity	200,000 L_{☉}
Temperature	3,550 K

Other designations
- WY Velorum, CD−52°3010, CPD−52°2262, HD 81137, TIC 294974397, TYC 8584-2732-1, GSC 08584-02732, IRAS 09203-5220, 2MASS J09215913-5233514, WISE J092158.85-523348.7, Gaia DR3 5313125719158014208

Database references
SIMBAD	data

WY Velorum, also known as HD 81137, is a binary system between a variable red supergiant (RSG) and a blue giant companion in the constellation of Vela. It is located approximately 1,900 parsecs (6,200 light-years) distant. Its apparent magnitude slowly varies over the course of years between 8.84 and 10.22. As such, it has been described as an irregular variable, though a rough 550-day period and a more uncertain 370-day period have been detected. The primary star is among the largest stars discovered to date, with an estimated radius of 1,157 R_{☉} (5.38 AU). If it replaced the Sun, its surface would reach past Jupiter's orbit (5.20 AU).

== Physical properties ==
Early publications in 1928 and 1939 classified the star as a possible R Coronae Borealis variable. Later authors were split on whether it was a symbiotic star or a VV Cephei-type star. The two differ in that the former consists of a red giant and a white dwarf or neutron star, while the latter is usually composed of a K- or M-type RSG and a massive early B-type star. The latter was confirmed to be the case in a 1988 paper, and the companion was identified as a giant star with the spectral type B2. This study also presented the absolute magnitudes of the two stars, −4.8 for the primary and −1.7 for the secondary, albeit this has been calculated using a distance of 1400 pc, smaller than modern estimates. With an updated value of 1900 pc, its K_{S} band absolute magnitude is gauged at −11.3. No radial velocity variations have been detected, so the binary likely has a small orbital inclination.

== Spectrum ==
The star has a peculiar spectrum, as indicated by the "pe" suffix in the spectral type (the "p" stands for peculiar, and the "e" stands for emission lines). It displays various strong emission lines, namely of hydrogen, nitrogen, oxygen, silicon, sulfur, iron, nickel, copper, and possibly chromium, many of them forbidden lines. Among them, the strong [Fe II] (forbidden line of singly ionized iron) emission is particularly unusual. Its spectral peculiarities are so unique that astronomer William P. Bidelman could identify the star by merely looking at the spectrum. However, in the ultraviolet region, as observed by the International Ultraviolet Explorer, it only shows the emission lines for Mg II (Mg^{+}). In this regard, it is similar to the symbiotic star CH Cygni, except that CH Cygni also has neutral oxygen lines.

Excess infrared emission signifies the existence of circumstellar dust at a temperature of 600 K (327 °C; 620 °F). The spectrum does not appear to be reddened.

== Historical observations ==
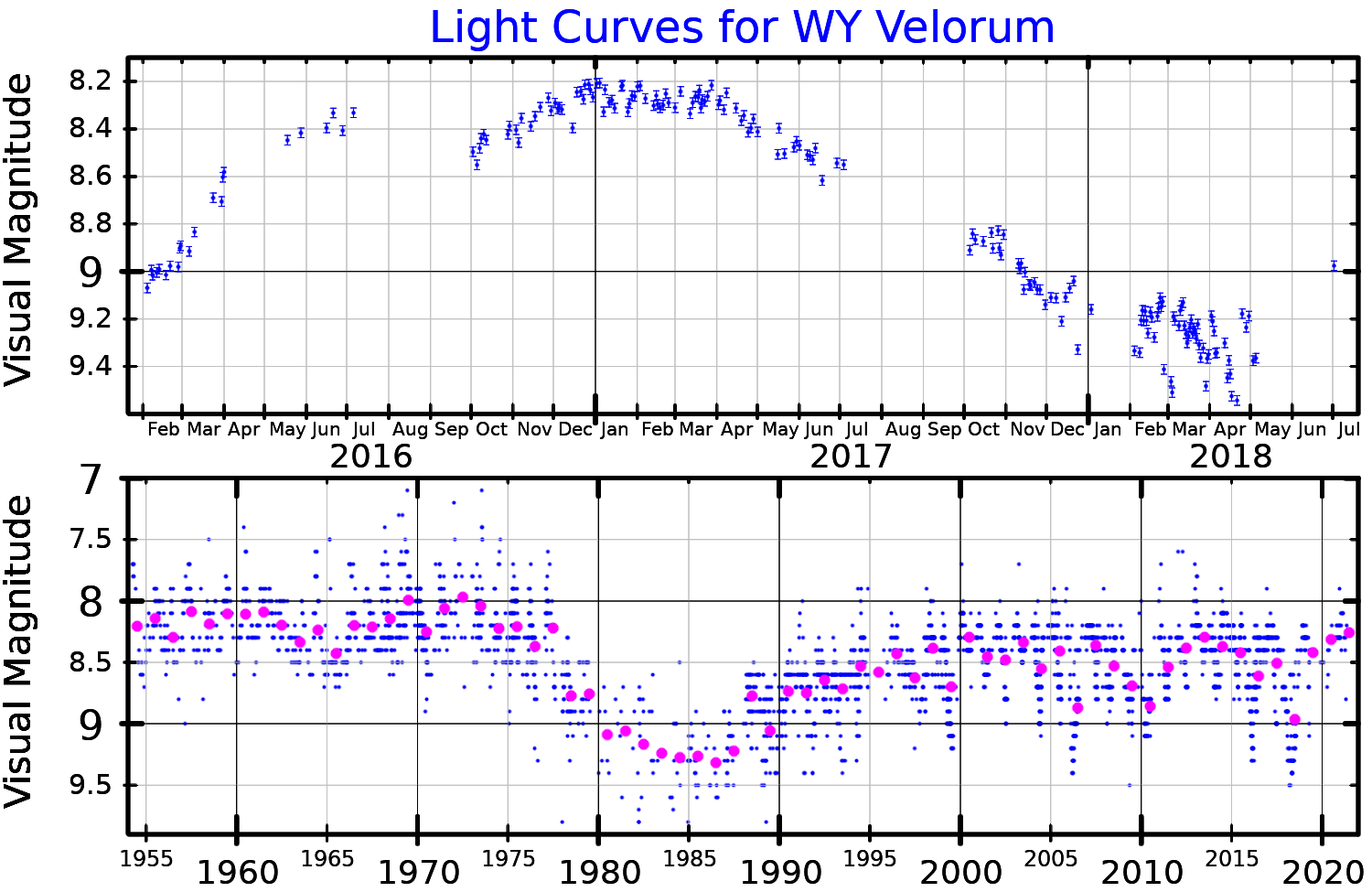
Two light curves for WY Velorum. The upper plot, of ASAS-SN data, shows the variability on the timescale of months. The lower plot, of AAVSO data, shows the variability on the timescale of years. The purple dots show the yearly averages.

The star's variability was first discovered by Annie Jump Cannon. Between 1890 and 1901, the brightness gradually increased from magnitude 9.8 to 9.2, but it slowly dimmed since 1902 to reach magnitude 10.1 by May 1922. Additional research on the light curves published in 1947 by Cecilia Payne-Gaposchkin indicate that the fading that began in 1902 halted around 1916, after which the star remained almost constant until 1933, when it began to brighten again.

No discernible changes occurred in the spectrum of the star between 1944 and 1948, but in 1952, the H-α line shifted from a single line to a double line, and previously unseen faint H-β features appeared. In 1956, it was reported that the calcium H and K lines swung from absorption to emission during two consecutive nights. By 1969, the RSG had likely become fainter than it was in the 1940s.
