= HD 76805 =

Triple star system in the constellation Vela

- Location of HD 76805 (circled in red)

Observation data Epoch J2000.0 Equinox ICRS
- Constellation: Vela
- Right ascension: 08^{h} 56^{m} 19.2615^{s}
- Declination: −52° 43′ 24.506″
- Apparent magnitude (V): 4.70

Characteristics
- Spectral type: B5V + B9.5V

Astrometry

A
Proper motion (μ)	RA: −15.386±0.588 mas/yr Dec.: 14.468±0.524 mas/yr
Parallax (π)	8.5823±0.3177 mas
Distance	380 ± 10 ly (117 ± 4 pc)

B
Proper motion (μ)	RA: −17.787±0.271 mas/yr Dec.: 12.031±0.250 mas/yr
Parallax (π)	8.1722±0.1358 mas
Distance	399 ± 7 ly (122 ± 2 pc)

Orbit
Primary	Aa
Name	Ab
Period (P)	1.097654
Eccentricity (e)	0
Semi-amplitude (K_{1}) (primary)	48.7 km/s
Semi-amplitude (K_{2}) (secondary)	92.8 km/s

Details

Aa
Mass	4.14 M_{☉}
Temperature	16,000 K
Rotational velocity (v sin i)	50 km/s

Ab
Mass	0.59 M_{☉}
Temperature	9,500 K

B
Mass	1.55 M_{☉}
Temperature	8,871 K

Other designations
- H Vel, CPD−52 1788, HD 76805, HIP 43878, HR 3574, SAO 236417

Database references
SIMBAD	data

HD 76805, also known as H Velorum, is a triple star system in the constellation Vela, at a distance of approximately 390 light years.

A visual pair of stars with magnitudes 4.7 and 8.0 are separated by 2.7″. Their estimated orbital period is 646,000 years. The primary is a spectroscopic binary with two B-class main sequence stars in a 1.1-day orbit.
