= H Velorum =

The Bayer designations h Velorum and H Velorum are distinct. Due to technical limitations, both designations link here. For the star

- h Velorum, see HD 75630
- H Velorum, see HD 76805
