= HD 88206 =

Star in the constellation Vela

- Location of HD 88206 (circled)

Observation data Epoch J2000.0 Equinox J2000.0
- Constellation: Vela
- Right ascension: 10^{h} 08^{m} 56.2396^{s}
- Declination: −51° 48′ 40.542″
- Apparent magnitude (V): 4.85

Characteristics
- Spectral type: B3III/IV
- B−V color index: −0.120±0.004

Astrometry
Radial velocity (R_{v})	+14.0±4.2 km/s
Proper motion (μ)	RA: −15.556±0.103 mas/yr Dec.: +0.667±0.102 mas/yr
Parallax (π)	2.0767±0.1021 mas
Distance	1,570 ± 80 ly (480 ± 20 pc)
Absolute magnitude (M_{V})	−3.19

Details
Mass	9.1±0.2 M_{☉}
Radius	4.5 R_{☉}
Luminosity (bolometric)	9,580 L_{☉}
Temperature	17,900 K
Age	23.8±2.3 Myr

Other designations
- Q Velorum, 186 G. Vel, CD−51°4507, HD 88206, HIP 49712, HR 3990, SAO 237736

Database references
SIMBAD	data

HD 88206 is a star in the southern constellation of Vela. HD 88206 is its designation in the Henry Draper catalogue and it also has the Gould designation 186 G. Velorum and the Bayer designation Q Velorum. The star has a blue-white hue and is faintly visible to the naked eye with an apparent visual magnitude of 4.85.

Parallax measurements provide a distance estimate of approximately 1,570 light years from the Sun. It is drifting further away with a radial velocity of +14 km/s. Although a young star and positioned in the general vicinity of the Scorpius–Centaurus association, it is most likely not a member.

This massive star has a stellar classification of B3III/IV, which suggests it is entering the giant stage of its evolution. It is 24 million years old with 9 times the mass of the Sun and about 4.5 times the Sun's radius. The star is radiating 9,580 times the luminosity of the Sun from its photosphere at an effective temperature of about 17,900 K.
