= O Velorum =

Star in the constellation Vela

- Location of O Velorum (circled)

Observation data Epoch J2000.0 Equinox ICRS
- Constellation: Vela
- Right ascension: 09^{h} 43^{m} 42.24^{s}
- Declination: −53° 53′ 28.6″
- Apparent magnitude (V): +5.55

Characteristics
- Evolutionary stage: main sequence
- Spectral type: A0V

Astrometry
Radial velocity (R_{v})	10.0 km/s
Proper motion (μ)	RA: −67.451±0.069 mas/yr Dec.: 33.101±0.058 mas/yr
Parallax (π)	9.3543±0.0513 mas
Distance	349 ± 2 ly (106.9 ± 0.6 pc)
Absolute magnitude (M_{V})	+0.45

Details
Mass	2.70±0.03 M_{☉}
Radius	2.7 R_{☉}
Luminosity	77 L_{☉}
Surface gravity (log g)	4.0 cgs
Temperature	10,023 K

Other designations
- O Vel, HD 84461, HIP 47717, HR 3875, SAO 237268

Database references
SIMBAD	data

O Velorum (O Vel / HD 84461) is a star in the constellation of Vela, one of the parts into which the constellation Argo Navis was divided. It has an apparent magnitude +5.55 and the "O" refers to its Bayer designation. It is located 343 light-years from the Solar System, with a error of 2.3%.

== Characteristics ==
O Velorum is classified as a white subgiant of spectral type A0IV, although a recent study indicates that it has not yet left the main sequence and that it still has 31% of its way through that stage. Given its classification as a subgiant, it would be a star similar to Alhena (γ Geminorum), but its luminosity —77 times greater than that of the Sun— is more comparable to that of an A0 main sequence star such as Phecda (γ Ursae Majoris), Sadachbia (γ Aquarii) or ε Herculis.

O Velorum has an effective temperature of 10,023 kelvins (10,350 according to another source) of 10,350 K. and a mass of 2.70 ± 0.03 solar masses. Its radius is estimated to be 2.7 times larger than the Sun's radius and it spins on its axis with a rotation speed of at least 40 km/s.
