= HR 4180 =

Star in the constellation Vela

- Location of HR 4180 (circled in red)

Observation data Epoch J2000 Equinox ICRS
- Constellation: Vela
- HD 92449
- Right ascension: 10^{h} 39^{m} 18.3925^{s}
- Declination: −55° 36′ 11.765″
- Apparent magnitude (V): 4.29
- HD 92463
- Right ascension: 10^{h} 39^{m} 24.2778^{s}
- Declination: −55° 36′ 25.642″
- Apparent magnitude (V): 6.06

Characteristics
- Spectral type: G5 IIa + B8 V
- B−V color index: 1.025±0.003

Astrometry

HD 92449
| Radial velocity (R_{v}) | +20.1±0.7 km/s |
| Proper motion (μ) | RA: −19.032(91) mas/yr Dec.: 5.032(90) mas/yr |
| Parallax (π) | 4.1595±0.0940 mas |
| Distance | 780 ± 20 ly (240 ± 5 pc) |
| Absolute magnitude (M_{V}) | −2.76 |

HD 92463
| Proper motion (μ) | RA: −18.941(40) mas/yr Dec.: 5.386(42) mas/yr |
| Parallax (π) | 4.2647±0.0405 mas |
| Distance | 765 ± 7 ly (234 ± 2 pc) |

Details

A
| Mass | 3.43 M_{☉} |
| Radius | 48 R_{☉} |
| Luminosity | 1,340 L_{☉} |
| Surface gravity (log g) | 2.02 cgs |
| Temperature | 5,180 K |

B
| Mass | 3.76 M_{☉} |
| Radius | 3.91 R_{☉} |
| Luminosity | 308 L_{☉} |
| Surface gravity (log g) | 3.736 cgs |
| Temperature | 12,240 K |

Other designations
- x Vel, HR 4180, WDS J10393-5536
- A: CPD−54 3915, HD 92449, HIP 52154, SAO 238309
- B: CD−54 3675, HD 92463, SAO 238313

Database references
| SIMBAD | HD 92449 |
- HD 92463

HR 4180 is a double star with components HD 92449 and HD 92463 in the southern constellation of Vela. They are probably members of a binary star system. HR 4180 can be viewed with the naked eye, having an apparent visual magnitude of 4.29. Based upon the annual parallax shift of the two stars it is located approximately 780 light years from the Sun. The system is moving further from the Earth with a heliocentric radial velocity of +20 km/s.

The primary component of this system, HD 92449, is a bright giant with a stellar classification of G5 IIa. The star is estimated to have 3.4 times the mass of the Sun and 48 times the Sun's radius. It radiates 1,340 times the Sun's luminosity from its photosphere at an effective temperature of 5,180 K.

The secondary is the common proper motion HD 92463, of apparent magnitude 6.06. The pair likely form a binary system. This secondary component is a B-type main-sequence star with a class of B8 V, and has an estimated 3.8 times the mass, 3.9 times the radius, and 308 times the Sun's luminosity. As of 2000, it had an angular separation of 51.70″ along a position angle of 105° from the primary.
