= HD 70930 =

Binary star system in the constellation Vela

- Location of HD 70930 (circled in red)

Observation data Epoch J2000 Equinox ICRS
- Constellation: Vela
- Right ascension: 08^{h} 22^{m} 31.6941^{s}
- Declination: −48° 29′ 25.363″
- Apparent magnitude (V): 4.79 (5.14 + 6.08)

Characteristics
- Spectral type: B1V or B2III
- B−V color index: −0.146±0.002

Astrometry
Radial velocity (R_{v})	+27.0±4.5 km/s
Proper motion (μ)	RA: −5.10±0.39 mas/yr Dec.: +7.76±0.33 mas/yr
Parallax (π)	1.90±0.32 mas
Distance	approx. 1,700 ly (approx. 530 pc)
Absolute magnitude (M_{V})	−3.74

Details
Mass	15.6±0.8 M_{☉}
Radius	13.6 R_{☉}
Luminosity	20,893 L_{☉}
Surface gravity (log g)	2.74 cgs
Temperature	23,532 K
Rotational velocity (v sin i)	220 km/s
Age	10.0±0.1 Myr

Other designations
- I 67, B Velorum, CD−48°3734, HD 70930, HIP 41039, HR 3294, SAO 219848, CCDM 08225-4829, WDS J08225-4829AB

Database references
SIMBAD	data

HD 70930 is a binary star system in the southern constellation of Vela. It has the Bayer designation B Velorum, while HD 70930 is the star's identifier in the Henry Draper catalogue. With a combined apparent visual magnitude of 4.79, it is visible to the naked eye as a faint point of light. The distance to this system is approximately 1,700 light years based on parallax, and it has an absolute magnitude of −3.74. It is drifting further away from the Sun with a radial velocity of about +27 km/s. The system is a member of the Vel OB2 association of co-moving stars.

The double nature of this system was discovered in 1896 by Scottish astronomer Robert T. A. Innes – it is now known to be a double-lined spectroscopic binary. The magnitude 5.14 primary component has a blue-white hue and has been assigned stellar classifications of B1V and B2III, matching a B-type main-sequence star or a giant star, respectively. It is a massive object – over 15 times the mass of the Sun – and is around 10 million years old. The star has a high rate of spin, showing a projected rotational velocity of 220 km/s. Its companion, at magnitude +6.08, is located at an angular separation of 0.8″ along a position angle of 139°, as of 2008.
