= HD 78004 =

Star in the constellation Vela

- Location of c Velorum (circled in red)

Observation data Epoch J2000.0 Equinox ICRS
- Constellation: Vela
- Right ascension: 09^{h} 04^{m} 09.27988^{s}
- Declination: −47° 05′ 51.8548″
- Apparent magnitude (V): 3.75

Characteristics
- Spectral type: K2III
- B−V color index: +1.174±0.056

Astrometry
Radial velocity (R_{v})	+24.3±0.7 km/s
Proper motion (μ)	RA: −47.45 mas/yr Dec.: +41.48 mas/yr
Parallax (π)	10.89±0.11 mas
Distance	300 ± 3 ly (91.8 ± 0.9 pc)
Absolute magnitude (M_{V})	−1.06

Details
Radius	27.32+3.61 −2.54 R_{☉}
Luminosity	271.5±8.3 L_{☉}
Temperature	4,483+224 −270 K

Other designations
- c Vel, CD−46°4883, HD 78004, HIP 44511, HR 3614, SAO 220803

Database references
SIMBAD	data

HD 78004 is a single star in the constellation Vela. It has the Bayer designation c Velorum, while HD 78004 is the identifier from the Henry Draper catalogue. The object has an orange hue and is visible to the naked eye with an apparent visual magnitude of 3.75. It is located at a distance of approximately 320 light years from the Sun based on parallax, and is drifting further away with a radial velocity of +24 km/s.

This is an aging K-type giant star with a stellar classification of K2III, having exhausted the supply of hydrogen at its core then cooled and expanded off the main sequence. At present, it has 27 times the radius of the Sun. The star is radiating 271.5 times the luminosity of the Sun from its enlarged photosphere at an effective temperature of 4,483 K.
