= HD 93385 =

Star in the constellation Vela

Observation data Epoch J2000 Equinox J2000
- Constellation: Vela
- Right ascension: 10^{h} 46^{m} 15.116^{s}
- Declination: −41° 27′ 51.73″
- Apparent magnitude (V): 7.486

Characteristics
- Evolutionary stage: main sequence
- Spectral type: G2/G3 V
- B−V color index: 0.595

Astrometry
Radial velocity (R_{v})	+47.80±0.61 km/s
Proper motion (μ)	RA: −48.135 mas/yr Dec.: −54.551 mas/yr
Parallax (π)	23.1489±0.018 mas
Distance	140.9 ± 0.1 ly (43.20 ± 0.03 pc)
Absolute magnitude (M_{V})	+4.37

Details
Mass	1.07 M_{☉}
Radius	1.17 R_{☉}
Luminosity	1.42 L_{☉}
Surface gravity (log g)	4.08±0.11 cgs
Temperature	5,823±35 K
Metallicity [Fe/H]	−0.05±0.03 dex
Age	4.13 Gyr

Other designations
- CD−40°6283, HD 93385, HIP 52676, SAO 222310

Database references
SIMBAD	data
Exoplanet Archive	data

HD 93385 is a star in the southern constellation of Vela. At an apparent visual magnitude of 7.5, it is too faint to be seen with the unaided eye. Parallax measurements made using the Gaia spacecraft show an annual shift of 23.15 mas. This is equivalent to a physical separation of around 141 light years from the Sun. It is drifting further away with a radial velocity of +47.8 km/s.

This is an ordinary G-type main sequence star with a stellar classification of G2/G3 V. The physical properties of HD 93385 are similar to those of the Sun; it is slightly larger with 107% of the Sun's mass, 117% of the radius, and 142% of the luminosity. The abundance of elements, other than hydrogen and helium, is nearly the same as in the Sun. It is currently at an unusual low level of surface activity and thus is a candidate Maunder minimum analog.

A physical companion star with an apparent visual magnitude of 12.29 is located at an angular separation of 10.32 arcseconds (equivalent to projected separation of 448 AU) along a position angle of 288°. It is estimated to have 45% of the mass of the Sun. A 2015 survey ruled out the existence of any additional stellar companions at projected distances from 12 to 352 astronomical units.

== Planetary system ==
This star hosts two close-orbiting, super-Earth-like planets, suspected since 2011 and confirmed in 2021. The first has 8.3 times the mass of the Earth and an orbital period of 13.186 days. The second is 10.1 times the Earth's mass with a period of 46.025 days. A third planet on an innermost orbit was discovered in 2017 and confirmed in 2021.

The HD 93385 A planetary system
Companion (in order from star)	Mass	Semimajor axis (AU)	Orbital period (days)	Eccentricity	Inclination	Radius
b	≥4.2±0.5 M_{🜨}	0.0756±0.0013	7.3426±0.0012	<0.295	—	—
c	≥7.1±0.6 M_{🜨}	0.112±0.002	13.180±0.003	<0.20	—	—
d	≥8.7±0.9 M_{🜨}	0.2565±0.0043	45.85±0.05	0.09+0.15 −0.05	—	—
