= HD 72108 =

Star system in the constellation Vela

Observation data Epoch J2000.0 Equinox ICRS
- Constellation: Vela
- Right ascension: 08^{h} 29^{m} 04.752^{s}
- Declination: −47° 55′ 44.12″
- Apparent magnitude (V): +5.33

Characteristics
- Spectral type: B2IV + B2IV

Astrometry
Radial velocity (R_{v})	29.00±3.7 km/s
Proper motion (μ)	RA: −6.90±0.43 mas/yr Dec.: +7.12±0.34 mas/yr
Parallax (π)	1.53±0.34 mas
Distance	approx. 2,100 ly (approx. 700 pc)
Absolute magnitude (M_{V})	−1.06

Orbit
Primary	HD 72018 Aa
Name	HD 72018 Ab
Period (P)	340±50 yr
Semi-major axis (a)	0.427±0.030″
Eccentricity (e)	0.748±0.030
Inclination (i)	78.9±2.0°
Longitude of the node (Ω)	114.7±2.0°
Periastron epoch (T)	1947.7±2.0
Argument of periastron (ω) (secondary)	300.0±5.0°

Details

HD 72018 Aa
Mass	6.08±3.43 M_{☉}

HD 72018 Ab
Mass	5.45±3.08 M_{☉}

Other designations
- HR 3358, CD−47°4004, HIP 41616, SAO 219985, WDS J08291-4756AB

Database references
SIMBAD	data

HD 72108 (A Vel, A Velorum) is a star system in the constellation Vela. It is approximately 1640 light years from Earth.

The primary component, HD 72108 A, is a blue-white B-type subgiant with an apparent magnitude of +5.33. It is a spectroscopic binary, whose components are separated by 0.176 arcseconds. At a distance of 4 arcseconds away is the third component, the magnitude +7.7 HD 72108 B. The fourth component, HD 72108 C has an apparent magnitude of +9.3, and is 19 arcseconds from the primary.
