= HD 73526 =

Star in the constellation Vela

Observation data Epoch J2000.0 Equinox ICRS
- Constellation: Vela
- Right ascension: 08^{h} 37^{m} 16.48335^{s}
- Declination: −41° 19′ 08.7904″
- Apparent magnitude (V): +8.99

Characteristics
- Evolutionary stage: subgiant
- Spectral type: G6 V
- B−V color index: 0.737±0.005

Astrometry
Radial velocity (R_{v})	+26.31±0.10 km/s
Proper motion (μ)	RA: −60.993 mas/yr Dec.: 159.192 mas/yr
Parallax (π)	10.3311±0.0144 mas
Distance	315.7 ± 0.4 ly (96.8 ± 0.1 pc)
Absolute magnitude (M_{V})	+4.1±0.2
Absolute bolometric magnitude (M_{bol})	+3.7±0.2

Details
Mass	1.01±0.04 M_{☉}
Radius	1.53±0.03 R_{☉}
Luminosity	2.14+0.68 −0.52 L_{☉}
Surface gravity (log g)	4.13±0.06 cgs
Temperature	5,564±16 K
Metallicity [Fe/H]	+0.23±0.02 dex
Rotational velocity (v sin i)	1.69±0.26 km/s
Age	9.59±1.00 Gyr

Other designations
- CD−40°4454, HD 73526, HIP 42282, SAO 220191

Database references
SIMBAD	data
Exoplanet Archive	data

HD 73526 is a star in the southern constellation of Vela. With an apparent visual magnitude of +8.99, it is much too faint to be viewed with the naked eye. The star is located at a distance of approximately 316 light-years (97 parsecs) from the Sun based on parallax, and is drifting further away with a radial velocity of +26 km/s. It is a member of the thin disk population.

The stellar classification of HD 73526 is G6 V, indicating this is a G-type main-sequence star that, like the Sun, is generating energy through core hydrogen fusion. Based on its properties, it may be starting to evolve off the main sequence. This star has slightly more mass than the Sun and a 53% greater radius. The abundance of iron in its atmosphere suggests the star's metallicity – what astronomers term the abundance of elements with higher atomic number than helium – is 70% greater than in the Sun. It is a much older star with an estimated age of nearly ten billion years, and is spinning slowly with a projected rotational velocity of 1.7 km/s. The star is radiating more than double the luminosity of the Sun from its photosphere at an effective temperature of 5,564 K.

== Planetary system ==
On June 13 2002, a 2.1 M_{J} planet HD 73526 b was announced orbiting HD 73526 in an orbit just a little smaller than that of Venus' orbit around the Sun. This planet receives an insolation 3.65 times that of Earth or 1.89 times that of Venus. In 2006, a 2.3 M_{J} second planet HD 73526 c was discovered. This planet forms a 2:1 orbital resonance with planet b. Both planets were detected by the radial velocity method. Although these are minimum masses as the inclinations of these planets are unknown, orbital stability analysis indicates that the orbital inclinations of both planets are likely to be near 90°, making the minimum masses very close to the true masses of the planets.

According to one 2024 study, the two planets seem to be in a very deep resonance with very long timescale stability due to an ACR (Apsidal Corotation Resonance) the planets seem to satisfy. Conversely, another 2024 study found that the system should quickly become unstable, and their analysis of the radial velocity data did not significantly detect planet b. Based on this, they argued that planet b is likely to be a false positive.

The HD 73526 planetary system
Companion (in order from star)	Mass	Semimajor axis (AU)	Orbital period (days)	Eccentricity	Inclination (°)	Radius
b (disputed)	≥2.25±0.12 M_{J}	0.65±0.01	188.9±0.1	0.29±0.03	—	—
c	≥2.25±0.13 M_{J}	1.03±0.02	379.1±0.5	0.28±0.05	—	—

== See also ==
- List of extrasolar planets
- Gliese 876
