= HD 75063 =

Star in the constellation Vela

- Location of a Velorum (circled in red)

Observation data Epoch J2000.0 Equinox ICRS
- Constellation: Vela
- Right ascension: 08^{h} 46^{m} 01.64391^{s}
- Declination: −46° 02′ 29.5042″
- Apparent magnitude (V): 3.87

Characteristics
- Spectral type: A1III or A0 II
- B−V color index: 0.015±0.029

Astrometry
Radial velocity (R_{v})	+23.2±0.3 km/s
Proper motion (μ)	RA: −12.82 mas/yr Dec.: +4.23 mas/yr
Parallax (π)	1.76±0.14 mas
Distance	1,900 ± 100 ly (570 ± 50 pc)
Absolute magnitude (M_{V})	−4.89

Details
Mass	8.6±0.3 M_{☉}
Radius	41 R_{☉}
Luminosity	6,800 L_{☉}
Temperature	8,195 K
Rotational velocity (v sin i)	30 km/s
Age	30.6±2.6 Myr

Other designations
- a Vel, CD−45°4517, HD 75063, HIP 43023, HR 3487, SAO 220422

Database references
SIMBAD	data

HD 75063 is a single star in the southern constellation of Vela. It has the Bayer designation of a Velorum, while HD 75063 is the identifier from the Henry Draper Catalogue. This is a naked-eye star with an apparent visual magnitude of 3.87 and has a white hue. The star is located at a distance of approximately 1,900 light-years from the Sun based on parallax measurements and has an absolute magnitude of −4.89. It is drifting further away with a radial velocity of +23 km/s.

This object has been stellar classifications of A1III and A0 II, matching a massive A-type giant or bright giant star, respectively. It is an estimated 31 million years old and is spinning with a projected rotational velocity of 30 km/s. The star has 8.6 times the mass of the Sun and around 4.5 times the Sun's radius. The star is radiating 6,800 times the Sun's luminosity from its photosphere at an effective temperature of 8,195 K.
