= HR 3407 =

Star in the constellation Vela

Observation data Epoch J2000 Equinox ICRS
- Constellation: Vela
- Right ascension: 08^{h} 34^{m} 43.59703^{s}
- Declination: −49° 56′ 39.1359″
- Apparent magnitude (V): 5.01

Characteristics
- Evolutionary stage: Giant star
- Spectral type: K1.5Ib
- U−B color index: +1.38
- B−V color index: +1.33
- Variable type: microvariable

Astrometry
Radial velocity (R_{v})	4.25±0.17 km/s
Proper motion (μ)	RA: −14.236±0.322 mas/yr Dec.: +18.540±0.353 mas/yr
Parallax (π)	3.1501±0.1571 mas
Distance	1,040 ± 50 ly (320 ± 20 pc)
Absolute magnitude (M_{V})	–2.06

Details
Mass	3.3±1.1 M_{☉}
Radius	56 R_{☉}
Luminosity	1,010±131 L_{☉}
Surface gravity (log g)	2.0 cgs
Temperature	4,245 K
Metallicity [Fe/H]	−0.4 dex
Rotational velocity (v sin i)	4.1 km/s

Other designations
- C Vel, CD−49°3646, FK5 2674, HD 73155, HIP 42088, HR 3407, SAO 220138

Database references
SIMBAD	data

HR 3407 is a single star in the southern constellation of Vela. It has the Bayer designation C Velorum; HR 3407 is the designation in the Bright Star Catalogue. It is an orange-hued star that is dimly visible to the naked eye with an apparent visual magnitude of 5.01. The distance to this object is approximately 1,040 light years based on parallax measurements, and it is drifting further away with a radial velocity of 4 km/s.

This star has stellar classification of K1.5Ib, which would suggest it is a supergiant, but is actually a giant star according to modern studies. It has about three times the mass of the Sun and has expanded to around 56 times the Sun's radius. The latter is equivalent to 0.26 AU. It is spinning with a projected rotational velocity of 4.1. The star displays microvariability with a period of 10.99 cycles per day and an amplitude of 0.0036 in magnitude. It is radiating around 1,010 times the luminosity of the Sun from its enlarged photosphere at an effective temperature of 4,245 K.
