= Vela (constellation) =

Constellation in the southern celestial hemisphere

- Constellation
- List of stars in Vela
- Abbreviation: Vel
- Genitive: Velorum
- Pronunciation: /ˈviːlə/, genitive /vɪˈloʊrəm/
- Symbolism: the Sails
- Right ascension: 9^{h}
- Declination: −50°
- Quadrant: SQ2
- Area: 500 sq. deg. (32nd)
- Main stars: 5
- Bayer/Flamsteed stars: 50
- Stars brighter than 3.00^{m}: 5
- Stars within 10.00 pc (32.62 ly): 3
- Brightest star: γ Vel (1.75^{m})
- Nearest star: Luhman 16
- Messier objects: 0
- Meteor showers: Delta Velids; Gamma Velids; Puppid-Velids
- Bordering constellations: Antlia; Pyxis; Puppis; Carina; Centaurus
- Visible at latitudes between +30° and −90°. Best visible at 21:00 (9 p.m.) during the month of March.

Vela is a constellation in the southern sky, which contains the Vela Supercluster. Its name is Latin for the sails of a ship, and it was originally part of a larger constellation, the ship Argo Navis, which was later divided into three parts, the others being Carina and Puppis. With an apparent magnitude of 1.8, its brightest star is the hot blue multiple star Gamma Velorum, one component of which is the closest and brightest Wolf-Rayet star in the sky. Delta and Kappa Velorum, together with Epsilon and Iota Carinae, form the asterism known as the False Cross. 1.95-magnitude Delta is actually a triple or quintuple star system.

== History ==
Argo Navis was one of the 48 classical constellations listed by the 2nd-century astronomer Ptolemy, and represented the ship Argo, used by Jason and the Argonauts on their quest for the Golden Fleece in Greek mythology. German cartographer Johann Bayer depicted the constellation on his Uranometria of 1603, and gave the stars Bayer designations from Alpha to Omega. However, his chart was inaccurate as the constellation was not fully visible from the Northern Hemisphere.

Argo was more accurately charted and subdivided in 1752 by the French astronomer Nicolas Louis de Lacaille, forming Carina (the keel), Vela (the sails), and Puppis (the poop deck). Despite the division, Lacaille kept Argo's Bayer designations. Therefore, Carina has the Alpha, Beta and Epsilon originally assigned to Argo Navis, while Vela's brightest stars are Gamma and Delta, Puppis has Zeta as its brightest star, and so on.

== Characteristics ==
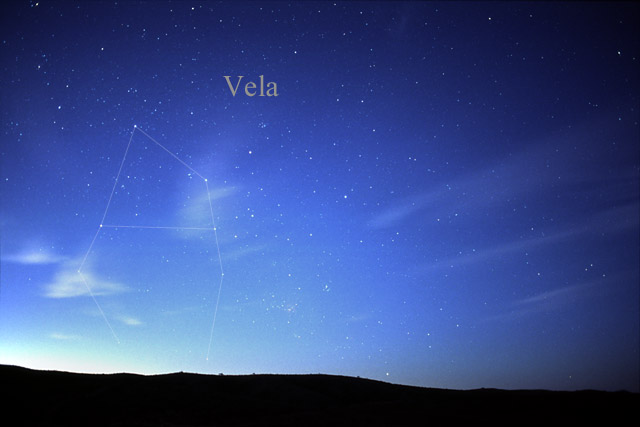
The constellation of Vela, the sails, as it can be seen by the naked eye

Vela is bordered by Antlia and Pyxis to the north, Puppis to the northwest, Carina to the south and southwest, and Centaurus to the east. Covering 500 square degrees, it ranks 32nd of the 88 modern constellations in size. The three-letter abbreviation for the constellation, as adopted by the International Astronomical Union in 1922, is "Vel".

The official constellation boundaries, as set by Eugène Delporte in 1930, are defined by a polygon of 14 segments. In the equatorial coordinate system, the right ascension coordinates of these borders lie between 08^{h} 13.3^{m} and 11^{h} 05.5^{m} , while the declination coordinates are between −37.16° and −57.17°.

== Features ==
=== Stars ===
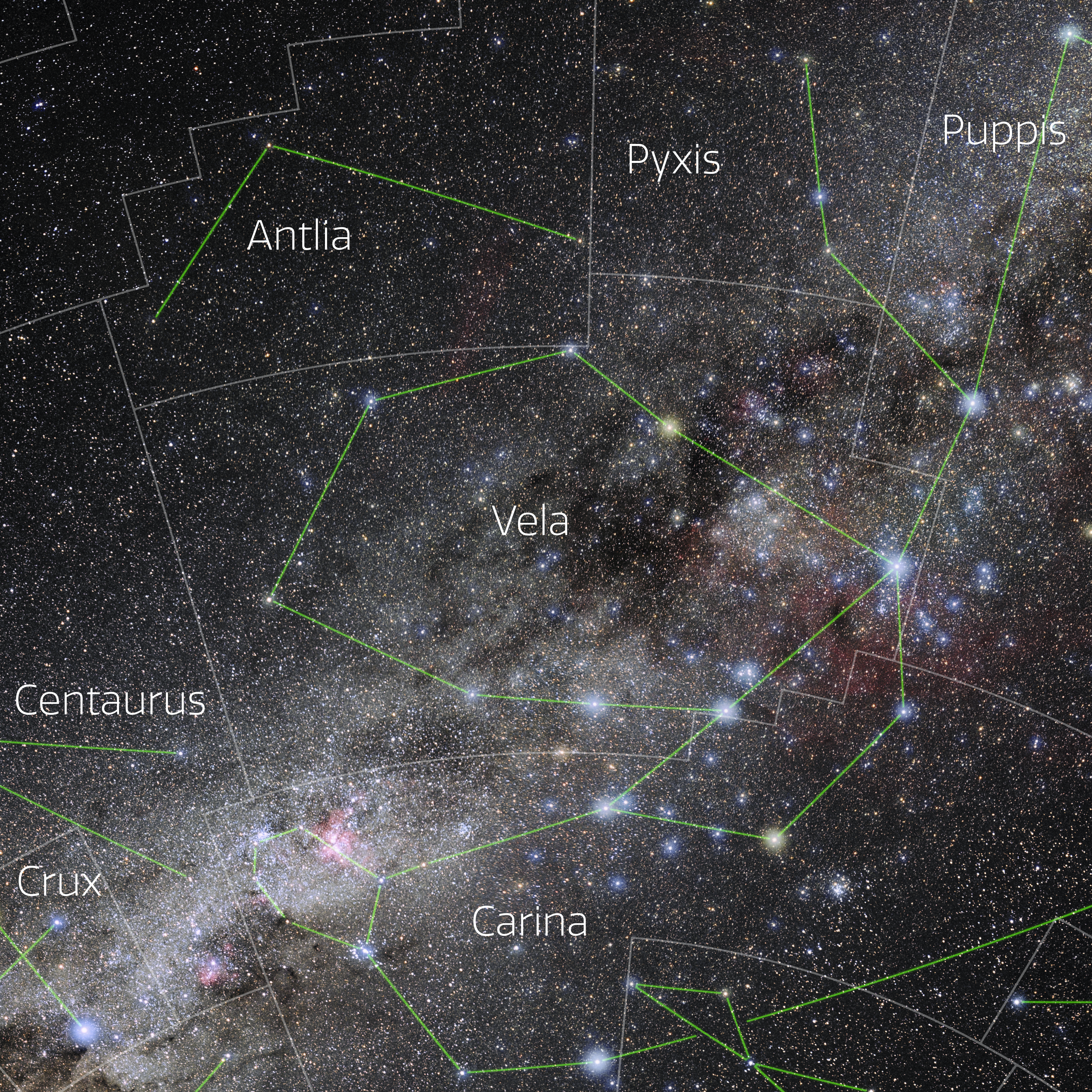
The constellation Vela showing the IAU boundaries, the constellation stick figure, and labels for its brightest stars. Astrophotograph by Eckhard Slawik, from NOIRLab's 88 Constellations project.

The brightest star in the constellation, Gamma Velorum, is a complex multiple star system. The brighter component, known as Gamma^{2} Velorum, shines as a blue-white star of apparent magnitude 1.83. It is a spectroscopic binary made up of two very hot blue stars orbiting each other every 78.5 days and separated by somewhere between 0.8 and 1.6 Astronomical Units (AU). The brighter component is a hot blue main-sequence star of spectral type O7.5 and is around 280,000 times as luminous, is around 30 times as massive and is 17 times the diameter of the Sun with a surface temperature of 35,000 K. The second component is an extremely rare example of hot star known as a Wolf–Rayet star, and is the closest and brightest example in the sky. It has a surface temperature of 57,000 and is around 170,000 times as luminous as the Sun, though it radiates most of its energy in the ultraviolet spectrum. Gamma^{1} is a blue-white star of spectral type B2III and apparent magnitude 4.3. The two pairs are separated by 41 arcseconds, easily separable in binoculars. Parallax measurements give a distance of 1,116 light-years, meaning that they are at least 12,000 AU apart. Further afield are 7.3-magnitude Gamma Velorum C and 9.4-magnitude Gamma Velorum D, lying 62 and 93 arcseconds south-southeast from Gamma^{2}. These stars are the most prominent members of Vela OB2, an extended association of young stars.

Dusty ring around double star IRAS 08544-4431.

The next brightest star is Delta Velorum or Alsephina, also a multiple star system and one of the brightest eclipsing binaries in the sky. Together with Kappa Velorum or Markeb, Iota Carinae or Aspidiske and Epsilon Carinae or Avior, it forms the diamond-shaped asterism known as the False Cross—so called because it is sometimes mistaken for the Southern Cross, causing errors in astronavigation. Appearing as a white star of magnitude 1.95, Delta is actually a triple or possibly quintuple star system located around 80 light-years from the Solar System. Delta A has a magnitude of 1.99 and is an eclipsing binary composed of two A-type white stars (Delta Aa and Ab) which orbit each other every 45.2 days and lie 0.5 AU from each other, with a resulting drop in magnitude of 0.4 when the dimmer one passes.in front of the brighter. Delta B is a 5.1 magnitude yellow G-class star of similar dimensions to the Sun which ranges between 26 and 72 AU away from the brighter pair, taking 142 years to complete a revolution. Further out still, at a distance of 1700 AU, are two red dwarfs of magnitudes 11 and 13. If they are part of the multiple system, they take 28000 years to complete an orbit. Also called Markeb, Kappa appears as a blue-white star of spectral type B2IV-V and magnitude 2.47 but is in fact a spectroscopic binary. The two orbit around each other with a period of 116.65 days, but the size, mass and nature of the companion are as yet unclear.

The orange-hued Lambda Velorum, or Suhail, is the third-brightest star in the constellation. A supergiant of spectral type K4Ib-II, it varies between magnitudes 2.14 and 2.3, and lies 545 light-years distant. It has around 11,000 times the luminosity, 9 to 12 times the mass and 207 times the diameter of the Sun.

AH Velorum is a Cepheid variable located less than a degree to the northeast of Gamma. A yellow-white supergiant of spectral type F7Ib-II, it pulsates between magnitudes 5.5 and 5.89 over 4.2 days. Also lying close to Gamma, V Velorum is a Cepheid of spectral type F6-F9II ranging from magnitude 7.2 to 7.9 over 4.4 days. AI Velorum is located 2.8 degrees north-northeast of Gamma, a Delta Scuti variable of spectral type A2p-F2pIV/V that ranges between magnitudes 6.15 and 6.76 in around 2.7 hours.

V390 Velorum is an aged star that has been found to be surrounded by a dusty disk. An RV Tauri variable, it has a spectral type of F3e and ranges between magnitudes 9.01 and 9.27 over nearly 95 days.

Omicron Velorum is a blue-white subgiant of spectral type B3III-IV located around 495 light-years from the Solar System. A slowly pulsating B star, it ranges between magnitudes 3.57 and 3.63 over 2.8 days. It is the brightest star in, and gives its name to, the Omicron Velorum Cluster, also known as IC 2391, an open cluster located around 500 light-years away.

Seven star systems have been found to have planets. HD 75289 is a Sun-like star of spectral type G0V with a hot Jupiter planetary companion that takes only about 3.51 days to revolve at an orbital distance of 0.0482 AU. WASP-19 is a star of apparent magnitude 12.3 located 815 light-years away, which has a hot Jupiter-like planet that orbits every 0.7 days. HD 73526 is a Sun-like star of spectral type G6V that has two planets around double the mass of Jupiter each with orbits of 187 and 377 days, respectively.

HD 85390 is an orange dwarf of spectral type K1.5V lying around 111 light-years distant with a planet 42 times as massive as Earth orbiting every 788 days.

HD 93385 is a Sun-like star of spectral type G2/G3V located around 138 light-years away that is orbited by two super-Earths with periods of 13 and 46 days and masses 8.3 and 10.1 times that of Earth, respectively.

=== Brown dwarfs ===
The discovery of a binary brown dwarf system named Luhman 16 only 6.6 light-years away, the third-closest system to the Solar System, was announced on 11 March 2013.

=== Deep-sky objects ===
Of the deep-sky objects of interest in Vela is a planetary nebula known as NGC 3132, nicknamed the 'Eight-Burst Nebula' or 'Southern Ring Nebula' (see accompanying photo). It lies on the border of the constellation with Antlia. NGC 2899 is an unusual red-hued example. This constellation has 32 more planetary nebulae.

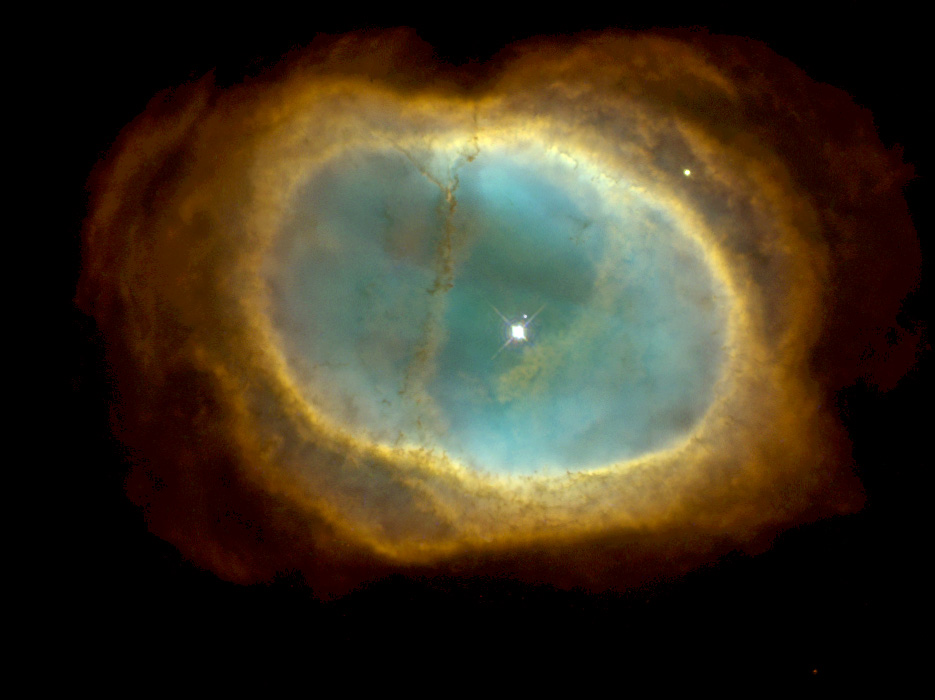
Deep-sky photograph of NGC 3132, also known as the Eight-Burst or Southern Ring Nebula. © NASA.

The Gum Nebula is a faint emission nebula, believed to be the remains of a million-year-old supernova. Within it lies the smaller and younger Vela Supernova Remnant. This is the nebula of a supernova explosion that is believed to have been visible from Earth around 10,000 years ago. The remnant contains the Vela Pulsar, the first pulsar to be identified optically. Nearby is NGC 2736, also known as the Pencil Nebula.

HH-47 is a Herbig-Haro Object, a young star around 1,400 light-years from the Sun that is ejecting material at tremendous speed (up to a million kilometres per hour) into its surrounds. This material glows as it hits surrounding gas.

NGC 2670 is an open cluster located in Vela. It has an overall magnitude of 7.8 and is 3,200 light-years from Earth. The stars of NGC 2670, a Trumpler class II 2 p and Shapley class-d cluster, are in a conformation suggesting a bow and arrow. Its class indicates that it is a poor, loose cluster, though detached from the star field. It is somewhat concentrated at its center, and its less than 50 stars range moderately in brightness.

Located 2 degrees south of Gamma Velorum, NGC 2547 is an open cluster containing around 50 stars of magnitudes 7 to 15.

NGC 3201 is a globular cluster discovered by James Dunlop on May 28, 1826. Its stellar population is inhomogeneous, varying with distance from the core. The effective temperature of the stars shows an increase with greater distance, with the redder and cooler stars tending to be located closer to the core. As of 2010, is one of only two clusters (including Messier 4) that shows a definite inhomogeneous population.

RCW 36 is a star-forming region in Vela, and one of the nearest sites of massive star formation. This star-forming region has given rise to a cluster of several hundred young stars that power an HII region. The star-forming region lies in Clump 6 in the Vela Molecular Ridge Cloud C.

== See also ==
- Vela star-forming regions
