= List of stars in Octans =

This is the list of notable stars in the constellation Octans, sorted by decreasing brightness.

Name	B	Var	HD	HIP	RA	Dec	vis. mag.	abs. mag.	Dist. (ly)	Sp. class	Notes
ν Oct	ν		205478	107089	21^{h} 41^{m} 28.47^{s}	−77° 23′ 22.1″	3.76	2.10	69	K0III	suspected variable, one planet around component A (Ab)
β Oct	β		214846	112405	22^{h} 46^{m} 03.72^{s}	−81° 22′ 53.8″	4.13	0.96	140	A9IV/V	
δ Oct	δ		124882	70638	14^{h} 26^{m} 55.74^{s}	−83° 40′ 04.3″	4.31	−0.35	279	K2III	suspected variable
θ Oct	θ		224889	122	00^{h} 01^{m} 35.85^{s}	−77° 03′ 55.1″	4.78	0.63	221	K2III	
ε Oct	ε	BO	210967	110256	22^{h} 20^{m} 01.48^{s}	−80° 26′ 22.7″	5.09	0.51	268	M6III	semiregular variable, V_{max} = 4.58^{m}, V_{min} = 5.3^{m}, P = 55 d
γ^{1} Oct	γ^{1}		223647	117689	23^{h} 52^{m} 06.69^{s}	−82° 01′ 07.6″	5.10	0.53	267	G7III	
α Oct	α		199532	104043	21^{h} 04^{m} 43.03^{s}	−77° 01′ 22.3″	5.13	1.85	148	F4III	β Lyr variable
λ Oct	λ		206240	107843	21^{h} 50^{m} 54.25^{s}	−82° 43′ 07.8″	5.27	−0.36	435	G8/K0III+..	
γ^{3} Oct	γ^{3}		636	814	00^{h} 10^{m} 02.27^{s}	−82° 13′ 26.4″	5.29	0.93	242	K1/K2III	
χ Oct	χ		164461	92824	18^{h} 54^{m} 47.65^{s}	−87° 36′ 19.9″	5.29	0.87	250	K3III	
ξ Oct	ξ		215573	112781	22^{h} 50^{m} 22.75^{s}	−80° 07′ 25.7″	5.32	−0.35	444	B6IV	53 Per variable, V_{max} = 5.32^{m}, V_{min} = 5.36^{m}, P = 1.76866 d
ζ Oct	ζ		79837	43908	08^{h} 56^{m} 41.88^{s}	−85° 39′ 47.6″	5.43	2.01	157	F0III	
ι Oct	ι		111482	63031	12^{h} 54^{m} 58.35^{s}	−85° 07′ 24.3″	5.45	0.17	371	K0III	
σ Oct	σ		177482	104382	21^{h} 08^{m} 46.01^{s}	−88° 57′ 23.4″	5.45	0.86	270	F0III	Polaris Australis, south pole star; δ Sct variable, ΔV = 0.05^{m}, P = 0.097 d
φ Oct	φ		167468	90133	18^{h} 23^{m} 36.44^{s}	−75° 02′ 39.6″	5.47	1.57	197	A0V	
ψ Oct	ψ		210853	110078	22^{h} 17^{m} 50.70^{s}	−77° 30′ 41.7″	5.49	2.56	125	F3III	
τ Oct	τ		219765	115836	23^{h} 28^{m} 03.57^{s}	−87° 28′ 56.1″	5.50	−0.52	522	K2III	
κ Oct	κ		117374	66753	13^{h} 40^{m} 56.18^{s}	−85° 47′ 09.6″	5.56	1.08	256	A2m...	
ρ Oct	ρ		137333	76996	15^{h} 43^{m} 16.10^{s}	−84° 27′ 55.8″	5.57	1.45	217	A2V	variable star, ΔV = 0.005^{m}, P = 069147 d
π^{1} Oct	π^{1}		130650	73540	15^{h} 01^{m} 50.70^{s}	−83° 13′ 40.0″	5.65	0.27	389	G8/K0III	
π^{2} Oct	π^{2}		131246	73771	15^{h} 04^{m} 46.96^{s}	−83° 02′ 17.8″	5.65	−2.98	1734	G8Ib	
HD 11025			11025	7568	01^{h} 37^{m} 27.78^{s}	−84° 46′ 10.7″	5.66	0.42	365	K0III	
γ^{2} Oct	γ^{2}		224362	118114	23^{h} 57^{m} 32.99^{s}	−82° 10′ 11.1″	5.72	0.80	314	K0III	
HD 222806			222806	117125	23^{h} 44^{m} 40.68^{s}	−78° 47′ 29.2″	5.74	−0.47	569	K1III	
HD 193721			193721	101427	20^{h} 33^{m} 17.61^{s}	−80° 57′ 53.4″	5.76	−0.28	527	G6/G8II	
υ Oct	υ		211539	111196	22^{h} 31^{m} 37.83^{s}	−85° 58′ 02.6″	5.76	0.73	330	K0III	
HD 1032			1032	1074	00^{h} 13^{m} 19.55^{s}	−84° 59′ 38.5″	5.78	−1.21	815	M0/M1III	suspected variable
HD 221420			221420	116250	23^{h} 33^{m} 19.55^{s}	−77° 23′ 07.2″	5.82	3.31	104	G2IV-V	has a brown dwarf companion (b)
HD 10800			10800	7601	01^{h} 37^{m} 54.98^{s}	−82° 58′ 31.0″	5.88	3.71	88	G2V	
ω Oct	ω		131596	74296	15^{h} 11^{m} 08.79^{s}	−84° 47′ 16.2″	5.88	0.93	318	B9.5V	
HD 194612			194612	101843	20^{h} 38^{m} 18.60^{s}	−81° 17′ 20.3″	5.89	−0.56	635	K5III	variable star, ΔV = 0.007^{m}, P = 2.18160 d
HD 208741			208741	108849	22^{h} 03^{m} 03.74^{s}	−76° 07′ 05.8″	5.94	1.99	201	F3III	
HD 167714			167714	90606	18^{h} 29^{m} 20.02^{s}	−80° 13′ 57.2″	5.95	0.81	348	K2III	
μ^{1} Oct	μ^{1}		196051	102162	20^{h} 42^{m} 02.52^{s}	−76° 10′ 50.0″	5.99	0.92	337	F4III-IV	
HD 222060			222060	116653	23^{h} 38^{m} 23.69^{s}	−76° 52′ 10.2″	5.99	−0.42	625	K0II/III	
HD 104555			104555	58697	12^{h} 02^{m} 20.68^{s}	−85° 37′ 54.3″	6.05	0.99	335	K3III	
CW Oct		CW	148542	83255	17^{h} 00^{m} 58.44^{s}	−86° 21′ 51.5″	6.05	−0.27	598	A2V	α² CVn variable
HD 218108			218108	114258	23^{h} 08^{m} 23.54^{s}	−79° 28′ 50.2″	6.11	1.75	243	A7Vn	
HD 212168			212168	110712	22^{h} 25^{m} 51.03^{s}	−75° 00′ 56.6″	6.12	4.31	75	G3IV	
HD 210056			210056	109584	22^{h} 11^{m} 55.13^{s}	−76° 06′ 57.3″	6.13	1.30	302	K0III	
HD 191220			191220	100697	20^{h} 24^{m} 54.80^{s}	−83° 18′ 38.3″	6.15	1.71	252	A2/A3m...	
HD 213402			213402	111504	22^{h} 35^{m} 26.36^{s}	−78° 46′ 17.6″	6.15	−1.47	1090	K1III	
HD 204904			204904	106881	21^{h} 38^{m} 56.15^{s}	−79° 26′ 33.1″	6.17	2.28	196	F4IV	
η Oct	η		96124	53702	10^{h} 59^{m} 14.16^{s}	−84° 35′ 37.9″	6.19	1.00	356	A1V	
HD 169904			169904	91723	18^{h} 42^{m} 14.36^{s}	−81° 48′ 29.1″	6.27	0.12	553	B8V	suspected variable
HD 107739			107739	60638	12^{h} 25^{m} 38.28^{s}	−86° 09′ 02.1″	6.32	−0.53	765	K0III	
HD 219572			219572	115129	23^{h} 19^{m} 08.55^{s}	−79° 28′ 20.8″	6.34	0.46	489	K0III	
HD 172226			172226	93117	18^{h} 58^{m} 10.03^{s}	−83° 25′ 19.8″	6.35	0.18	558	B9/B9.5V	
HD 203532			203532	106474	21^{h} 33^{m} 54.47^{s}	−82° 40′ 59.1″	6.35	−0.63	813	B3IV	
HD 171990			171990	92233	18^{h} 47^{m} 49.20^{s}	−77° 52′ 07.0″	6.39	3.22	141	G2V	suspected variable
HD 186154			186154	98086	19^{h} 56^{m} 01.62^{s}	−81° 20′ 59.4″	6.39	−0.25	694	K3/K4III	
HD 208500			208500	108759	22^{h} 01^{m} 52.65^{s}	−77° 39′ 45.1″	6.39	1.49	311	A5IV/V	
R Oct		R	40857	25412	05^{h} 26^{m} 06.12^{s}	−86° 23′ 17.8″	6.40		1960	M5.5e	Mira variable, V_{max} = 6.4^{m}, V_{min} = 13.2^{m}, P = 407 d
HD 25887			25887	17328	03^{h} 42^{m} 32.69^{s}	−85° 15′ 43.3″	6.40	0.56	481	B9V	
HD 218559			218559	114550	23^{h} 12^{m} 12.43^{s}	−80° 54′ 45.6″	6.43	0.17	582	K4III	
HD 202418			202418	106320	21^{h} 32^{m} 02.86^{s}	−84° 48′ 36.0″	6.44	−0.13	667	K3III	suspected variable, ΔV = 0.06^{m}
HD 159517			159517	88274	18^{h} 01^{m} 34.21^{s}	−85° 12′ 52.1″	6.45	2.32	219	F4V	
BP Oct		BP	129723	75736	15^{h} 28^{m} 20.68^{s}	−88° 07′ 58.1″	6.46	2.45	210	Am	δ Sct variable, ΔV = 0.04^{m}
HD 58805			58805	32500	06^{h} 46^{m} 58.52^{s}	−87° 01′ 29.9″	6.46	3.50	128	F3V	
HD 203955			203955	106424	21^{h} 33^{m} 21.07^{s}	−80° 02′ 21.5″	6.47	1.25	360	A0V	
HD 165338			165338	90509	18^{h} 28^{m} 06.35^{s}	−84° 23′ 14.0″	6.49	0.18	596	B8/B9V	
μ^{2} Oct	μ^{2}		196067	102125	20^{h} 41^{m} 43.74^{s}	−75° 21′ 01.5″	6.51	3.31	142	G1V	has a planet (b)
B Oct	B	CG	206553	112355	22^{h} 45^{m} 30.22^{s}	−88° 49′ 05.9″	6.57	1.50	335	F0IV-V	δ Sct variable
BQ Oct		BQ	110994	71348	14^{h} 35^{m} 29.51^{s}	−89° 46′ 18.2″	6.88		1600	S5,1	slow irregular variable, ΔV = 0.1^{m}
ο Oct	ο		1348	1007	00^{h} 12^{m} 33.96^{s}	−88° 21′ 46.3″	7.21	−1.49	1790	B9.5IV	
HD 142022			142022	79242	16^{h} 10^{m} 15.03^{s}	−84° 13′ 53.8″	7.70	5.01	112	K0V	binary star, component A has a planet (b)
HD 212301			212301	110852	22^{h} 27^{m} 30.92^{s}	−77° 43′ 04.5″	7.77	4.07	179	F8V	has a planet (b)
CF Oct		CF	196818	102803	20^{h} 49^{m} 37.26^{s}	−80° 08′ 01.0″	7.93		683	K0IIIp	slow irregular variable
HD 188136		CC	188136; 188137	98757	20^{h} 03^{m} 31.75^{s}	−78° 49′ 50.7″	8.01		620	ApSrYZrBa	δ Sct variable, ΔV = 0.1^{m}, P = 0.1249 d
X Oct		X	91620	51084	10^{h} 26^{m} 14.25^{s}	−84° 20′ 53.9″	8.70		997	M5/M6e	Mira variable, V_{max} = 6.8^{m}, V_{min} = 10.9^{m}, P = 200 d
HD 89499		DR	89499	49616	10^{h} 07^{m} 29.54^{s}	−85° 04′ 33.0″	8.70		373	G3V	RS CVn variable, V_{max} = 8.7^{m}, V_{min} = 8.73^{m}, P = 5.532 d
UV Oct		UV	156008	80990	16^{h} 32^{m} 59.53^{s}	−83° 14′ 10.5″	9.44		1340	A9:Ia/Iabw	RR Lyr variable, V_{max} = 8.7^{m}, V_{min} = 9.97^{m}, P = 0.54258 d
HD 190290		CK	190290		20^{h} 13^{m} 56.35^{s}	−78° 52′ 42.3″	9.9			ApEuSr	rapidly oscillating Ap star, ΔV = 0.1^{m}
RV Oct		RV		67227	13^{h} 46^{m} 31.75^{s}	−84° 24′ 06.4″	10.94		2470		RR Lyr variable, V_{max} = 10.356^{m}, V_{min} = 11.538^{m}, P = 0.5711700 d
EUVE J0317-85.5		CL			03^{h} 17^{m} 15.81^{s}	−85° 32′ 25.5″	14.72			DA	ZZ Cet variable, V_{max} = 14.72^{m}, V_{min} = 14.9^{m}
AO Oct		AO			21^{h} 05^{m} 08.23^{s}	−75° 21′ 01.8″	21.0				SU UMa variable, V_{max} = 14.2^{m}, V_{min} = 21.0^{m}, P = 0.06557 d
Table legend: • Name = Proper name • B = Bayer designation • F or/and G. = Flamsteed designation or Gould designation • Var = Variable star designation • HD = Henry Draper Catalogue designation number • HIP = Hipparcos Catalogue designation number • RA = Right ascension for the Epoch/Equinox J2000.0 • Dec = Declination for the Epoch/Equinox J2000.0 • vis. mag. = visual magnitude (m or m_{v}), also known as apparent magnitude • abs. mag. = absolute magnitude (M_{v}) • Dist. (ly) = Distance in light-years from Earth • Sp. class = Spectral class of the star in the stellar classification system • Notes = Common name(s) or alternate name(s); comments; notable properties [for example: multiple star status, range of variability if it is a variable star, exoplanets, etc.]

== See also ==
- List of stars by constellation
