= Pi Octantis =

The Bayer designation π Octantis (Pi Octantis, π Oct) is shared by two stars in the constellation Octans. Both of them are evolved G-type stars that have similar apparent magnitudes.

- π^{1} Octantis, HR 5525 or HD 130650
- π^{2} Octantis, HR 5545 or HD 131246
