= Mu Octantis =

The Bayer designation μ Octantis (mu Octantis) is shared by two stars in the constellation Octans:

- μ^{1} Octantis, HR 7863 or HD 196051
- μ^{2} Octantis, HR 7864 or HD 196067
