= Sigma Octantis =

Star in the constellation Octans

- Location of σ Octantis (circled)

Observation data Epoch J2000.0 Equinox J2000.0 (ICRS)
- Constellation: Octans
- Right ascension: 21^{h} 08^{m} 46.86357^{s}
- Declination: −88° 57′ 23.3983″
- Apparent magnitude (V): 5.47

Characteristics
- Spectral type: F0 IV
- U−B color index: +0.13
- B−V color index: +0.26
- Variable type: δ Sct

Astrometry
Radial velocity (R_{v})	+11.9 km/s
Proper motion (μ)	RA: +26.323 mas/yr Dec.: +4.721 mas/yr
Parallax (π)	11.1005±0.0616 mas
Distance	294 ± 2 ly (90.1 ± 0.5 pc)
Absolute magnitude (M_{V})	0.86±0.09

Details
Mass	1.59 M_{☉}
Radius	4.4 R_{☉}
Luminosity	44 L_{☉}
Surface gravity (log g)	3.71 cgs
Temperature	7,415±252 K
Metallicity [Fe/H]	−0.5 dex
Rotational velocity (v sin i)	145 km/s
Age	912 Myr

Other designations
- Polaris Australis, σ Oct, CPD−89°47, FK5 923, HD 177482, HIP 104382, HR 7228, SAO 258857

Database references
SIMBAD	data

Sigma Octantis is a solitary star in the constellation of Octans that forms the pole star of the Southern Hemisphere. Its name is also written as σ Octantis, abbreviated as Sigma Oct or σ Oct, and it is officially named Polaris Australis (/poʊˈlɛərɪs ɔːˈstreɪlɪs/). The star is positioned one degree away from the southern celestial pole of the Southern Hemisphere, lying in a nearly opposite direction to the North Star on the celestial sphere.

Located approximately 294 light-years from Earth, it is classified as a subgiant with a spectral type of F0 IV. Sigma Octantis has an apparent magnitude of 5.5, but is slightly variable and is classified as a Delta Scuti variable.

== Nomenclature ==
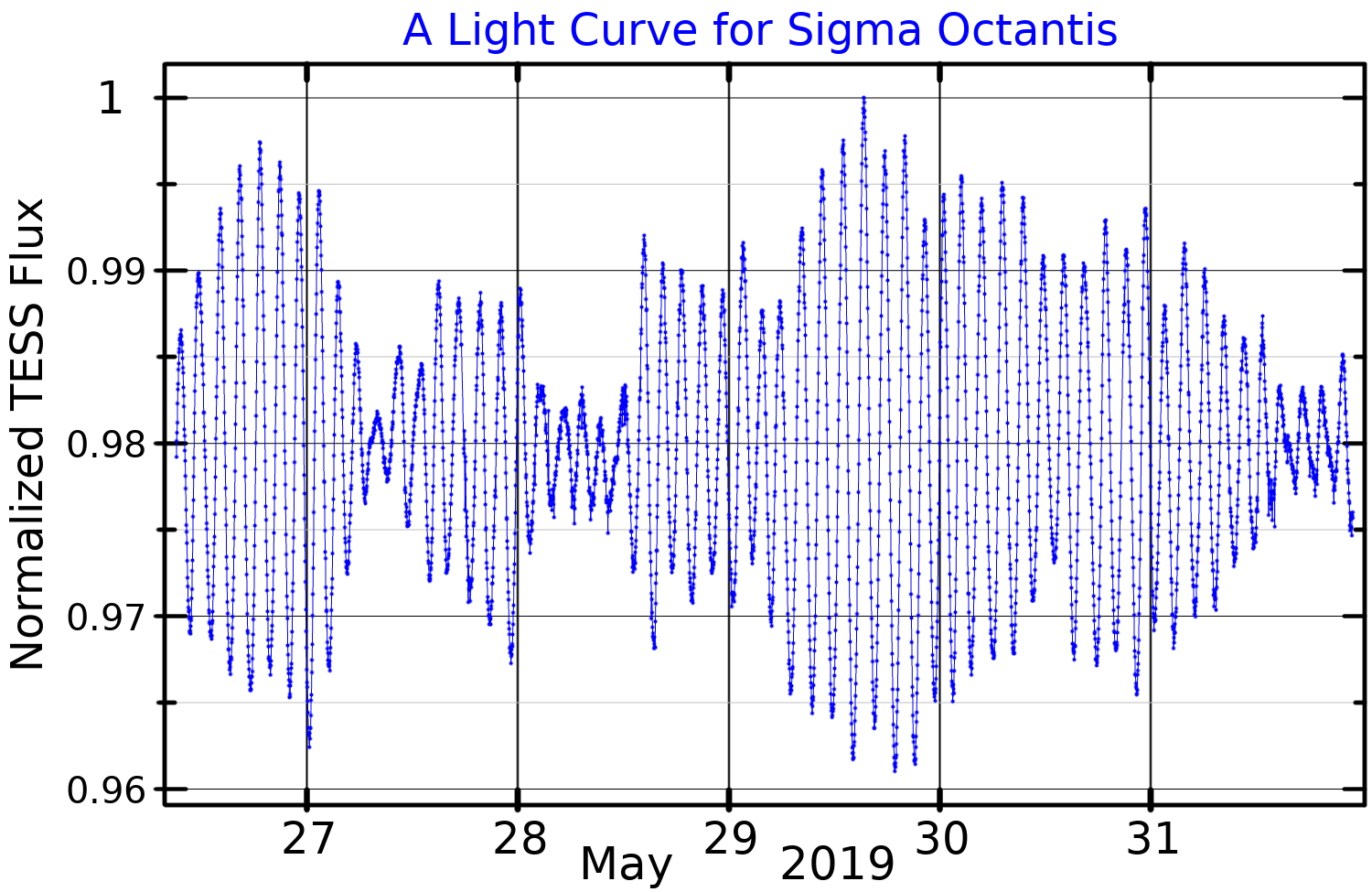
A light curve for Sigma Octantis, plotted from TESS data

σ Octantis (Latinised to Sigma Octantis) is the star's Bayer designation.

As the southern hemisphere's pole star it bore the name Polaris Australis, first applied in the 1700s. In 2016, the IAU organized a Working Group on Star Names (WGSN) to catalog and standardize proper names for stars. The WGSN approved the name Polaris Australis for this star on 5 September 2017 and it is now so included in the List of IAU-approved Star Names. It is the southernmost named star.

== Properties ==
With a spectral class of F0IV, Sigma Octantis appears to be a subgiant, although it has also been classified as F0III. Evolutionary models place it at the very end of its main sequence life with an age of about 900 million years. It has expanded somewhat to a size 4.4 times that of the Sun and emits 44 times as much electromagnetic radiation from its photosphere at an effective temperature of 7,415 K.

Sigma Octantis is a Delta Scuti variable, varying by about 0.03 magnitudes every 2.33 hours. It is thought to pulsate only in the fundamental mode.

== Southern pole star ==
Sigma Octantis is the current southern pole star, whose counterpart is Polaris, the current North Star. To an observer in the southern hemisphere, Sigma Octantis appears almost motionless and all the other stars in the Southern sky appear to rotate around it. It is part of a small "half hexagon" shape. It is slightly more than a degree away from the true south pole, and the south celestial pole is moving away from it due to precession of the equinoxes.

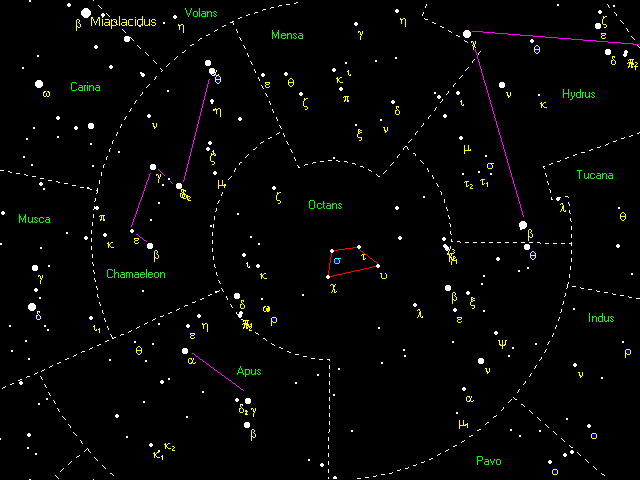
The south celestial pole. The trapezoidal asterism at the centre includes Sigma Octantis.

At magnitude +5.42, Sigma Octantis is barely visible to the naked eye, making it unusable for navigation, especially by comparison with the much brighter and more easily visible Polaris. Because of this, the constellation Crux is often preferred for determining the position of the South Celestial Pole. Once Sigma Octantis' approximate position has been determined, either by the major stars in Octans or using the Southern Cross (Crux) method, it can be positively verified using an asterism: Sigma, Chi, Tau, and Upsilon Octantis are all stars of around magnitude 5.6, and form the distinctive shape of a trapezoid.

== In astrometrics ==
Sigma Octantis was used as a reference to measure the magnitudes of stars in the southern hemisphere for the 1908 Revised Harvard Photometry catalogue. The Pole Star and Lambda Ursae Minoris were used for the northern hemisphere. It was then noted that "Neither of these stars appears to vary perceptibly" but that, due to the procedures used "if they did, the variation would have no effect on the final measures."

== In culture ==
Sigma Octantis is the dimmest star to be represented on a national flag. It appears on the flag of Brazil, symbolising the Brazilian Federal District.

== See also ==
- Polar alignment
- Polaris
