= NGC 7637 =

Galaxy in the constellation Octans

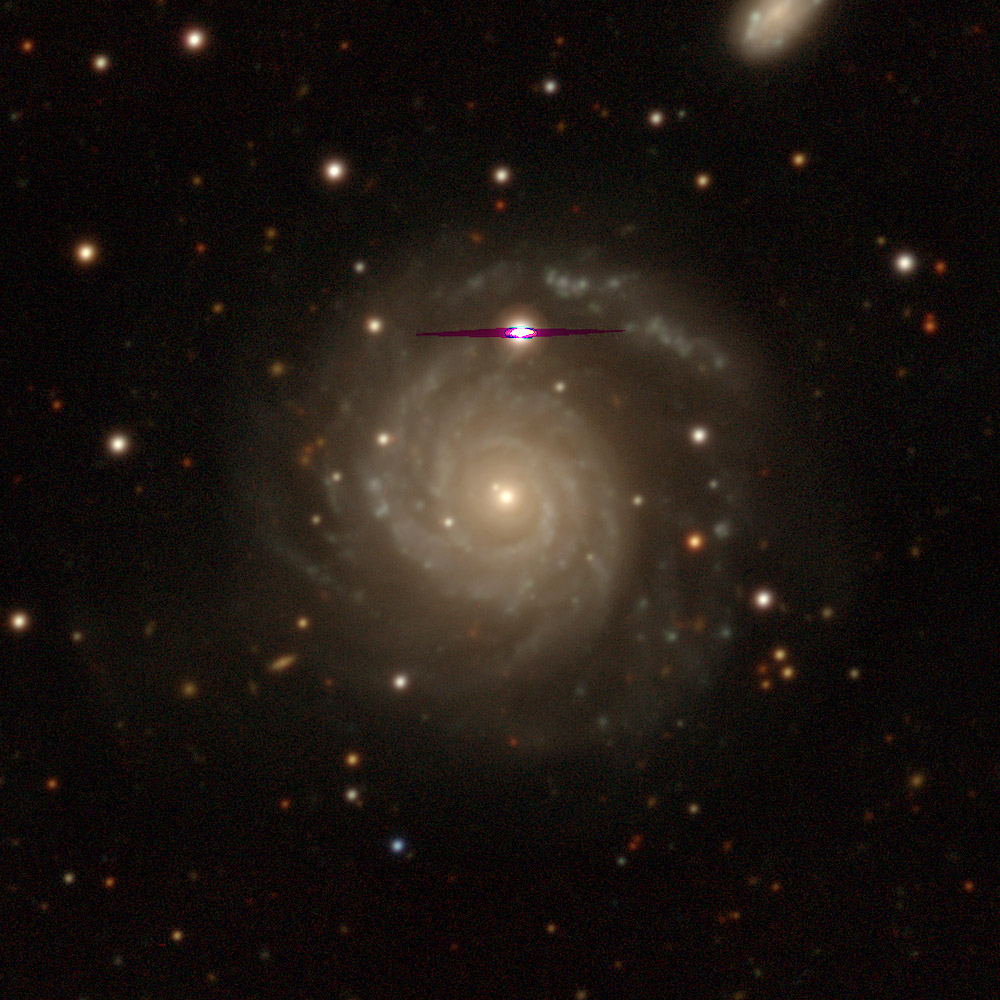
- NGC 7637 imaged by Legacy Surveys

Observation data (J2000 epoch)
- Constellation: Octans
- Right ascension: 23^{h} 26^{m} 27.6374^{s}
- Declination: −81° 54′ 41.516″
- Redshift: 0.012402
- Heliocentric radial velocity: 3718 ± 3 km/s
- Distance: 178.5 ± 12.5 Mly (54.73 ± 3.83 Mpc)
- Apparent magnitude (V): 13

Characteristics
- Type: SA(r)c
- Size: ~162,500 ly (49.83 kpc) (estimated)
- Apparent size (V): 2.1′ × 1.9′

Other designations
- ESO 012- G 001, IRAS 23226-8211, 2MASX J23262765-8154417, PGC 71440

NGC 7637 is a spiral galaxy in the constellation of Octans. Its velocity with respect to the cosmic microwave background is 3711 ± 3 km/s, which corresponds to a Hubble distance of 178.5 ± 12.5 Mly (54.73 ± 3.83 Mpc). It was discovered by British astronomer John Herschel on 17 October 1835.

== Supernovae ==
Three supernovae have been observed in NGC 7637:

- SN 1992ao (Type II, mag. 17) was discovered by Robert H. McNaught on 28 July 1992.
- SN 2012ah (Type Ia, mag. 14.8) was discovered by Stuart Parker on 21 February 2012.
- SN 2022iwt (Type II, mag. 16.825) was discovered by ATLAS on 29 April 2022.

== See also ==
- List of NGC objects (7001–7840)
