= HD 166066 =

Star in the constellation Octans

Observation data Epoch J2000.0 Equinox ICRS
- Constellation: Octans
- Right ascension: 18^{h} 38^{m} 51.0741^{s}
- Declination: −85° 42′ 32.226″
- Apparent magnitude (V): 8.10±0.01

Characteristics
- Spectral type: G0 V
- B−V color index: +0.59

Astrometry
Radial velocity (R_{v})	1.14±2.01 km/s
Proper motion (μ)	RA: +147.318 mas/yr Dec.: −43.097 mas/yr
Parallax (π)	14.5962±0.1186 mas
Distance	223 ± 2 ly (68.5 ± 0.6 pc)
Absolute magnitude (M_{V})	4.09

Details
Mass	1.13 M_{☉}
Radius	1.39^{+0.07}_{−0.05} R_{☉}
Luminosity	2.12 L_{☉}
Surface gravity (log g)	4.25 cgs
Temperature	6,054±80 K
Metallicity [Fe/H]	−0.03 dex
Rotational velocity (v sin i)	5 km/s
Age	7.0^{+2.5}_{−1.2} Gyr

Other designations
- CD−85°150, CPD−85°478, HD 166066, HIP 91434, GSC 09527-01174

Database references
SIMBAD	data

HD 166066 is a solitary star located in the southern circumpolar constellation Octans. It has an apparent magnitude of 8.10, making it readily visible in binoculars, but not to the naked eye. The object is located 223 light years away from the Solar System, but is drifting away with a poorly constrained radial velocity of about 1.14 km/s.

HD 166066 has a stellar classification of G0 V, indicating that it is a G-type main sequence star similar to the Sun. However, the calcium H & K lines are narrow and weak for its class. It has 113% the mass of the Sun and 139% its radius, along with twice its luminosity.

The iron abundance is 93% that of the Sun, and is slightly hotter, with an effective temperature of 6,054 K compared to the Sun's 5,778 K. HD 166066 is significantly older, with an age of 7 billion years, and rotates modestly with a projected rotational velocity of 5 km/s.
