= PGC 10922 =

Galaxy in the constellation Octans

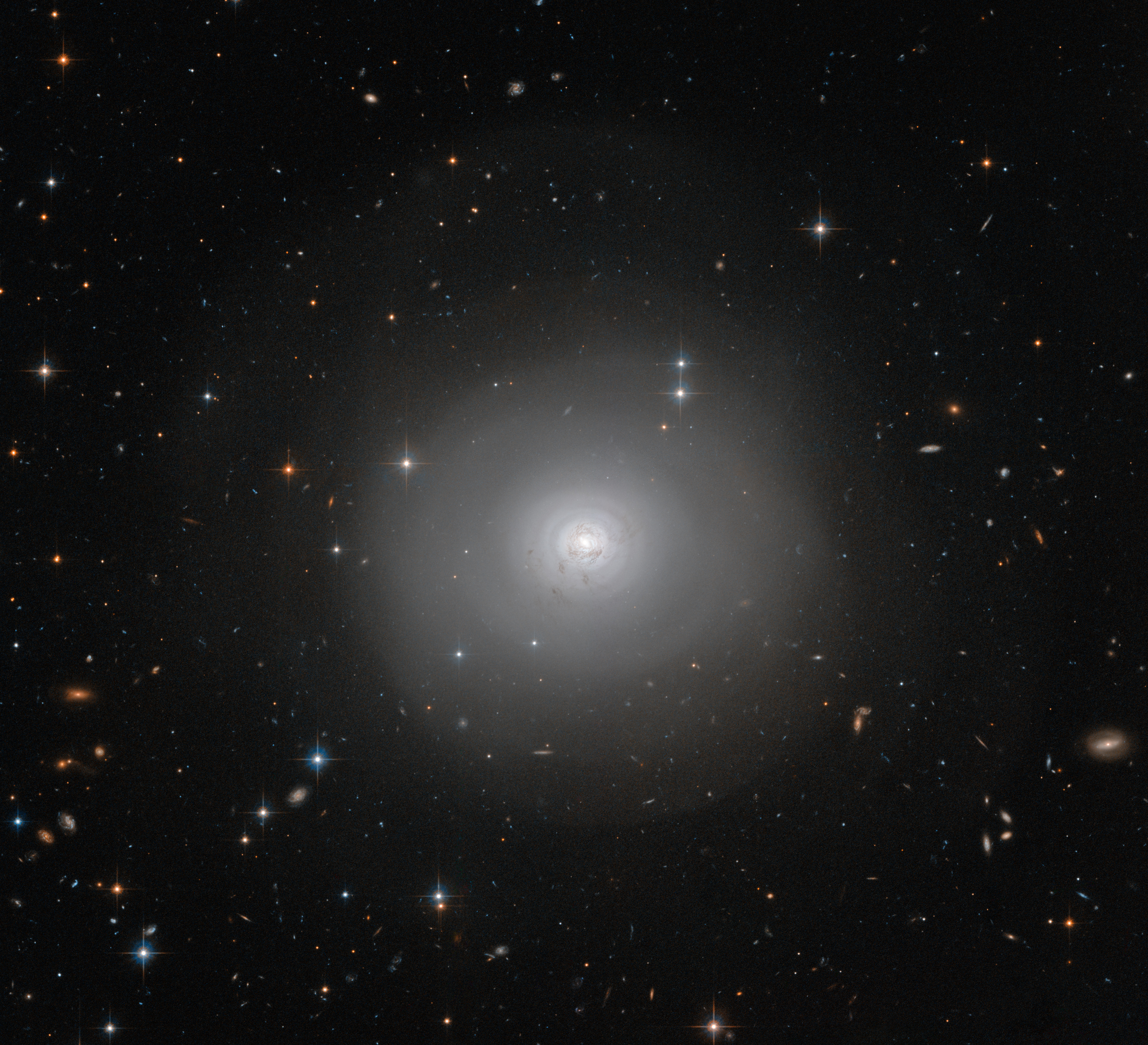
- PGC 10922 taken by the Hubble Space Telescope

Observation data (J2000 epoch)
- Constellation: Octans
- Right ascension: 02^{h} 53^{m} 35.851^{s}
- Declination: −83° 08′ 31.85″
- Redshift: 0.0161
- Heliocentric radial velocity: 4788 km/s
- Distance: 200 million ly
- Apparent magnitude (B): 13.74

Characteristics
- Type: S0
- Apparent size (V): 1.3 x 1.1 arcmin

Other designations
- ESO 3-13, IRAS 02575-8320, IRAS F02575-8320, PSCz Q02575-8320, 6dFGS gJ025335.9-830832, PGC 10922, 2MASX J02533585-8308318

PGC 10922 is a lenticular galaxy located 200 million light years from the Earth in the constellation Octans.
