= HD 169904 =

B-type main-sequence star; Octans

- Location of HD 204904 on the map (circled)

Observation data Epoch J2000.0 Equinox ICRS
- Constellation: Octans
- Right ascension: 18^{h} 42^{m} 14.42015^{s}
- Declination: −81° 48′ 29.2064″
- Apparent magnitude (V): 6.26±0.01

Characteristics
- Evolutionary stage: main sequence star
- Spectral type: B8 V
- U−B color index: −0.37
- B−V color index: −0.13
- Variable type: suspected

Astrometry
Radial velocity (R_{v})	−6.0±4.3 km/s
Proper motion (μ)	RA: +13.838 mas/yr Dec.: −16.605 mas/yr
Parallax (π)	6.7598±0.0413 mas
Distance	482 ± 3 ly (147.9 ± 0.9 pc)
Absolute magnitude (M_{V})	+0.19

Details
Mass	3.25±0.06 M_{☉}
Radius	2.42±0.12 R_{☉}
Luminosity	141^{+14}_{−13} L_{☉}
Surface gravity (log g)	4.20 cgs
Temperature	13,622 K
Metallicity [Fe/H]	−0.18 dex
Rotational velocity (v sin i)	123 km/s

Other designations
- 35 G. Octantis, NSV 24510, CD−81°693, CPD−81°813, GC 25366, HD 169904, HIP 91723, HR 6912, SAO 258804, TIC 351920521

Database references
SIMBAD	data

HD 169904 (HR 6912; 35 G. Octantis) is a solitary star located in the southern circumpolar constellation Octans. It has an apparent magnitude of 6.26, placing it near the limit for naked eye visibility, even under ideal conditions. Gaia DR3 parallax measurements imply a distance of 482 light-years and it is currently drifting closer with a somewhat constrained radial velocity of −6.0 km/s. At its current distance, HD 169904's brightness is diminished by 0.24 magnitudes due to interstellar extinction and it has an absolute magnitude of +0.19.

HD 169904 has a stellar classification of B8 V, indicating that it is an ordinary B-type main-sequence star that is generating energy via hydrogen fusion at its core. It has 3.25 times the mass of the Sun and 2.42 times the radius of the Sun. It radiates 141 times the luminosity of the Sun from its photosphere at an effective temperature of 13,622 K, giving it a blue-white hue when viewed in the night sky. HD 169904 is metal deficient with an iron abundance of [Fe/H] = −0.18 or 66.1% of the Sun's, and it spins rapidly with a projected rotational velocity of 123 km/s. HD 169904 is estimated to have completed 47.5% of its main sequence lifetime.

The object was listed as a suspected variable star based on photometric observations, but subsequent observations have not confirmed this.
