= Eta Octantis =

Star in the constellation of Octans

η Octantis
- Location of η Octantis (circled)

Observation data Epoch J2000 Equinox ICRS
- Constellation: Octans
- Right ascension: 10^{h} 59^{m} 13.7578^{s}
- Declination: −84° 35′ 38.018″
- Apparent magnitude (V): 6.18±0.01

Characteristics
- Evolutionary stage: main sequence
- Spectral type: A1 Va
- U−B color index: +0.12
- B−V color index: +0.11

Astrometry
| Radial velocity (R_{v}) | −1.7±0.6 km/s |
| Proper motion (μ) | RA: −65.747 mas/yr Dec.: −8.273 mas/yr |
| Parallax (π) | 9.1133±0.02 mas |
| Distance | 357.9 ± 0.8 ly (109.7 ± 0.2 pc) |
| Absolute magnitude (M_{V}) | +1.08 |

Details
| Mass | 2.37±0.03 M_{☉} |
| Radius | 2.6±0.1 R_{☉} |
| Luminosity | 45.3+3.1 −3.0 L_{☉} |
| Surface gravity (log g) | 4.1 cgs |
| Temperature | 9,500 K |
| Metallicity [Fe/H] | −0.01 dex |
| Rotational velocity (v sin i) | 152±13 km/s |
| Age | 547 Myr |

Other designations
- η Oct, 11 G. Octantis, CPD−83°386, FK5 1664, GC 15164, HD 96124, HIP 53702, HR 4312, SAO 258600

Database references
| SIMBAD | data |

Eta Octantis, Latinized from η Octantis, is a solitary star located in the southern circumpolar constellation Octans. It has an apparent magnitude of 6.19, making it faintly visible to the naked eye. The object is situated at a distance of 358 light years but is approaching the Solar System with a heliocentric radial velocity of −1.7 km/s.

Eta Octantis has a stellar classification of A1 Va, indicating that it is an ordinary A-type main sequence star. At present it has 2.37 times the Sun's mass and 2.6 times the Sun's radius. It shines with a luminosity of 45 L_{☉} from its photosphere at an effective temperature of 9,500 K, giving a white hue. Eta Octantis is a rapidly rotating star, with a projected rotational velocity of 152 km/s, and is estimated to be 547 million years old, having completed 72% of its main sequence lifetime.
