= HD 210056 =

Star in the constellation of Octans

Observation data Epoch J2000.0 Equinox ICRS
- Constellation: Octans
- Right ascension: 22^{h} 11^{m} 54.98416^{s}
- Declination: −76° 06′ 57.6788″
- Apparent magnitude (V): 6.13±0.01

Characteristics
- Evolutionary stage: red giant branch
- Spectral type: K0 III
- U−B color index: +0.82
- B−V color index: +1.00

Astrometry
Radial velocity (R_{v})	24±1 km/s
Proper motion (μ)	RA: −59.351 mas/yr Dec.: −40.005 mas/yr
Parallax (π)	11.1656±0.0205 mas
Distance	292.1 ± 0.5 ly (89.6 ± 0.2 pc)
Absolute magnitude (M_{V})	+1.41

Details
Mass	1.59±0.07 M_{☉}
Radius	7.72±0.13 R_{☉}
Luminosity	29.7±0.5 L_{☉}
Surface gravity (log g)	2.86±0.10 cgs
Temperature	4,849±37 K
Metallicity [Fe/H]	−0.08±0.03 dex
Rotational velocity (v sin i)	<1.5 km/s
Age	2.10±0.22 Gyr

Other designations
- 68 G. Octantis, CD−76°1120, CPD−76°1549, GC 31004, HD 210056, HIP 109584, HR 8432, SAO 258006

Database references
SIMBAD	data

HD 210056, also known as HR 8432, is a solitary orange hued star located in the southern circumpolar constellation Octans. Eggen (1993) listed it as a member of the old disk population.

The object has an apparent magnitude of 6.13, making it barely visible to the naked eye. Based on parallax measurements from the Gaia satellite, the object is estimated to be 292 light years distant. It appears to be receding with a heliocentric radial velocity of 24 km/s. At its current distance, HD 210056's brightness is diminished by 0.2 magnitudes due to interstellar dust. It has an absolute magnitude of +1.41.

This is an evolved giant star with a stellar classification of K0 III. It has 1.59 times the mass of the Sun but has expanded to 7.72 times its girth. It radiates 29.7 times the luminosity of the Sun from its enlarged photosphere at an effective temperature of 4,849 K. Based on asteroseismologic measurements, HD 210056 is estimated to be 2 billion years old. The star has about 90% of the Sun's metallicity — what astronomers define a star's abundance of chemical elements heavier than helium. It currently spins slowly with a projected rotational velocity lower than 1.5 km/s.
