= Psi Octantis =

Star in the constellation Octans

ψ Octantis
- Location of ψ Oct (circled)

Observation data Epoch J2000.0 Equinox J2000.0 (ICRS)
- Constellation: Octans
- Right ascension: 22^{h} 17^{m} 50.5954^{s}
- Declination: −77° 30′ 41.599″
- Apparent magnitude (V): 5.47±0.01

Characteristics
- Evolutionary stage: main sequence
- Spectral type: F0IIp (F4V:kA5)
- U−B color index: +0.12
- B−V color index: +0.31

Astrometry
Radial velocity (R_{v})	17.0±1.6 km/s
Proper motion (μ)	RA: −37.392 mas/yr Dec.: +13.788 mas/yr
Parallax (π)	25.7575±0.0505 mas
Distance	126.6 ± 0.2 ly (38.82 ± 0.08 pc)
Absolute magnitude (M_{V})	+2.56

Details
Mass	1.49±0.07 M_{☉}
Radius	1.74±0.04 R_{☉}
Luminosity	7.82 L_{☉}
Surface gravity (log g)	4.13±0.05 cgs
Temperature	7,244 K
Metallicity [Fe/H]	−0.04 dex
Age	1.41 Gyr

Other designations
- ψ Oct, 60 G. Octantis, CPD−78°1442, FK5 3779, GC 31133, HD 210853, HIP 110078, HR 8471, SAO 258020

Database references
SIMBAD	data

Psi Octantis, Latinized from ψ Octantis, is a solitary star in the southern circumpolar constellation Octans. It has an apparent magnitude of 5.47, allowing it to be seen with the naked eye under ideal conditions. The star is relatively close at a distance of 126 light years but is receding with a heliocentric radial velocity of 17 km/s.

Psi Octantis has a spectral classification of F0IIp, suggesting that it is a bright giant but with peculiarities. Other assessments give a luminosity class of III (giant), III-IV (intermediate between giant and subgiant), or V: (approximately main sequence). One paper gives a spectral class of F4V:kA5, indicating that it is a probable F-type main-sequence star with the calcium K-lines of an A5 star, including sharp absorption lines of metals. Analysis of its evolutionary stage show it to be a somewhat evolved main sequence star.

It has 149% the mass of the Sun and 1.74 times the radius of the Sun. It shines at 7.82 times the luminosity of the Sun from its photosphere at an effective temperature of 7,244 K, giving it a yellowish white glow. Psi Octantis has an iron abundance 91% that of the Sun and is estimated to be 1.41 billion years old.
