= Iota Octantis =

Double star in the constellation Octans

ι Octantis
Observation data Epoch J2000.0 Equinox ICRS
Constellation	Octans
- A
Right ascension	12^{h} 54^{m} 58.80097^{s}
Declination	−85° 07′ 24.1092″
- Apparent magnitude (V): 5.83
- B
Right ascension	12^{h} 54^{m} 58.33659^{s}
Declination	−85° 07′ 24.4647″
- Apparent magnitude (V): 6.75

Characteristics
- Spectral type: K0III + K0
- U−B color index: +0.79
- B−V color index: +1.02

Astrometry
Radial velocity (R_{v})	53.4±0.7 km/s
Proper motion (μ)	RA: +67.20 mas/yr Dec.: +24.76 mas/yr
Parallax (π)	9.27±0.46 mas
Distance	350 ± 20 ly (108 ± 5 pc)
Absolute magnitude (M_{V})	+0.29

Details
Mass	2.49+1.48 −1.31 M_{☉}
Luminosity	81±9 L_{☉}
Temperature	4,890±110 K
Metallicity [Fe/H]	−0.3 dex
Rotational velocity (v sin i)	1.9±1.3 km/s
Age	725 Myr

Other designations
- ι Octantis, 16 G. Octantis, CPD−84°407, GC 17460, HD 111482, HIP 63031, HR 4870, SAO 258654, WDS J12550-8507AB

Database references
SIMBAD	data

Iota Octantis, Latinized from ι Octantis, is a double star in the southern circumpolar constellation Octans. The two components are separated by less than an arc-second, so cannot be resolved without a telescope, but their combined apparent magnitude of 5.45 makes Iota Octantis faintly visible to the naked eye in dark skies. The system is located at a distance of 350 light years based on its annual parallax shift, and is drifting away at a rate of 53.4 km/s.

Iota Octantis A has a classification of K0 III, which indicates that it is an evolved K-type star that exhausted hydrogen at its core and left the main sequence. Iota Octantis B also has a spectral type of K0. At present Iota Octantis A has 2.49 times the mass of the Sun and radiates at 81 times the luminosity of the Sun from its enlarged photosphere at an effective temperature of 4,890 K, which gives it an orangish-yellow hue. Iota Octantis is metal deficient and spins slowly with a projected rotational velocity of 1.9 km/s.

Eggleton et al. states that both stars have similar spectral types, but there is a faint tenth magnitude companion with a classification of F8 located 60.1″ away, which is unrelated to the two.
