= Lambda Octantis =

Star in the constellation Octans

- Location of λ Octantis (circled)

Observation data Epoch J2000 Equinox J2000
- Constellation: Octans
- Right ascension: 21^{h} 50^{m} 54.56355^{s}
- Declination: −82° 43′ 08.0450″
- Apparent magnitude (V): 5.27 (5.64 + 7.25)

Characteristics
- Spectral type: G8-K0III + kA3hA7VmA8
- U−B color index: +0.47/+2.20
- B−V color index: +0.75

Astrometry

A
Radial velocity (R_{v})	−10.18±0.13 km/s
Proper motion (μ)	RA: +69.803 mas/yr Dec.: −33.013 mas/yr
Parallax (π)	8.1897±0.0878 mas
Distance	398 ± 4 ly (122 ± 1 pc)
Absolute magnitude (M_{V})	+0.40

B
Proper motion (μ)	RA: +69.025 mas/yr Dec.: −25.496 mas/yr
Parallax (π)	7.9685±0.0570 mas
Distance	409 ± 3 ly (125.5 ± 0.9 pc)
Absolute magnitude (M_{V})	+2.20

Details

A
Radius	13.23+0.41 −0.50 R_{☉}
Luminosity	102.4±1.3 L_{☉}
Temperature	5,048+98 −76 K
Rotational velocity (v sin i)	1.8 km/s
Age	200 Myr

Other designations
- λ Oct, CPD−83°722, GC 30472, HD 206240, HIP 107843, HR 8280, SAO 258914, CCDM J21509-8243, WDS J21509-8243

Database references
SIMBAD	data

λ Octantis, Latinized as Lambda Octantis, is a binary star system in the southern circumpolar constellation of Octans. It is visible to the naked eye as a dim point of light with a combined apparent visual magnitude of 5.27. The distance to this system is approximately 398–409 light years, based on parallax, but it is moving closer with a radial velocity of −10 km/s.

The primary, designated component A, is an aging, yellow-hued star with a stellar classification of class G8-K0III and a visual magnitude of 5.64. Having exhausted the supply of hydrogen at its core, it has expanded and cooled off the main sequence, becoming a giant. At present it is about 200 million years old and has 13 times the girth of the Sun. This star is radiating 102 times the luminosity of the Sun from its swollen photosphere at an effective temperature of 5,048 K.

The magnitude 7.25 secondary companion, component B, is an Am star with a class of kA3hA7VmA8. This notation indicates it has the calcium K line of an A3 class star, the hydrogen lines of a cooler A7 main sequence star, and the metal lines of an A8 star. As of 2008, it lies at an angular separation of 3.233″ from the primary.
