= HD 221420 =

Star with a brown dwarf companion

- Location of HD 221420 (circled in red)

Observation data Epoch J2000.0 Equinox J2000.0 (ICRS)
- Constellation: Octans
- Right ascension: 23^{h} 33^{m} 19.5789^{s}
- Declination: −77° 23′ 07.194″
- Apparent magnitude (V): 5.81±0.01

Characteristics
- Evolutionary stage: subgiant
- Spectral type: G2 IV-V
- U−B color index: +0.31
- B−V color index: +0.68

Astrometry
Radial velocity (R_{v})	26.48±0.02 km/s
Proper motion (μ)	RA: +16.306 mas/yr Dec.: +0.736 mas/yr
Parallax (π)	32.1023±0.0325 mas
Distance	101.6 ± 0.1 ly (31.15 ± 0.03 pc)
Absolute magnitude (M_{V})	+3.33

Details
Mass	1.35±0.01 M_{☉}
Radius	1.95±0.01 R_{☉}
Luminosity	4.01±1 L_{☉}
Surface gravity (log g)	4.03±0.03 cgs
Temperature	5,830±44 K
Metallicity [Fe/H]	+0.34±0.07 dex
Rotational velocity (v sin i)	2.8±0.5 km/s
Age	3.65±0.23 Gyr

Other designations
- 83 G. Octantis, CPD−78°1473, FK5 3887, GC 32742, GJ 4340, HD 221420, HIP 116250, HR 8935, SAO 258154

Database references
SIMBAD	data
Exoplanet Archive	data

HD 221420 (HR 8935; GJ 4340) is a likely binary star system in the southern circumpolar constellation Octans. It has an apparent magnitude of 5.81, allowing it to be faintly seen with the naked eye. The object is relatively close at a distance of 102 light years but is receding with a heliocentric radial velocity of 26.5 km/s.

HD 221420 has a stellar classification of G2 IV-V, indicating a solar analogue with a luminosity class intermediate between a subgiant and a main sequence star. The object is also extremely chromospherically inactive. It has a comparable mass to the Sun and a diameter of 1.95 R_{☉}. It shines with a luminosity of 4 L_{☉} from its photosphere at an effective temperature of 5,830 K, giving a yellow glow. HD 221420 is younger than the Sun at 3.65 billion years. Despite this, the star is already beginning to evolve off the main sequence. Like most planetary hosts, HD 221420 has a metallicity over twice of that of the Sun and spins modestly with a projected rotational velocity 2.8 km/s.

There is a mid-M-dwarf star with a similar proper motion and parallax to HD 221420, which is likely gravitationally bound to it. The two stars are separated by 698 arcseconds, corresponding to a distance of 21,756 AU.

== Planetary system ==
In a 2019 Doppler spectroscopy survey, an exoplanet was discovered orbiting the star. The planet was originally thought to be a super-Jupiter, having a minimum mass of 9.7 M_{J}. However, later observations using Hipparcos and Gaia astrometry found it to be a brown dwarf with a high-inclination orbit, revealing a true mass of 23 M_{J}.

The HD 221420 A planetary system
Companion (in order from star)	Mass	Semimajor axis (AU)	Orbital period (years)	Eccentricity	Inclination	Radius
b	22.9±2.2 M_{J}	10.15+0.59 −0.38	27.62+2.45 −1.54	0.14+0.04 −0.03	164.0+1.9 −2.6°	—
