= HD 193721 =

Astrometric binary in the constellation Octans

Observation data Epoch J2000.0 Equinox J2000.0 (ICRS)
- Constellation: Octans
- Right ascension: 20^{h} 33^{m} 17.6366^{s}
- Declination: −80° 57′ 53.5944″
- Apparent magnitude (V): 5.77±0.01

Characteristics
- Evolutionary stage: red giant branch
- Spectral type: G6/8 II
- U−B color index: +0.85
- B−V color index: +1.14

Astrometry
Radial velocity (R_{v})	8.6±0.7 km/s
Proper motion (μ)	RA: +9.794 mas/yr Dec.: −16.081 mas/yr
Parallax (π)	4.2823±0.165 mas
Distance	760 ± 30 ly (234 ± 9 pc)
Absolute magnitude (M_{V})	−0.24

Details
Mass	3.49 M_{☉}
Radius	24.38 R_{☉}
Luminosity	300±5 L_{☉}
Surface gravity (log g)	2.14±0.02 cgs
Temperature	4953±122 K
Metallicity [Fe/H]	−0.15 dex
Rotational velocity (v sin i)	2.7±1.1 km/s

Other designations
- 47 G. Octantis, CPD−81°901, FK5 3994, GC 28453, HD 193721, HIP 101427, HR 7785, SAO 258861, WDS J20333-8058A

Database references
SIMBAD	data

HD 193721 (HR 7785) is an astrometric binary in the southern circumpolar constellation Octans. It has an apparent magnitude of 5.77, allowing it to be faintly seen with the naked eye. Parallax measurements place the system 760 light years away from the Solar System and it is currently receding with a heliocentric radial velocity 8.6 km/s.

HD 193721 has a stellar classification of G6/8 II — intermediate between a G6 and 8 bright giant. At present it has 3.49 times the mass of the Sun, but has expanded to 24.4 times its girth. It shines with a luminosity of 300 L_{☉} from its enlarged photosphere at an effective temperature of 4,953 K, giving a yellow hue. HD 193721 is metal deficient with an iron abundance 71% that of the Sun and spins leisurely with a projected rotational velocity of 2.7 km/s.

The system has a companion designated CPD −81°900. The object has a spectral classification of F8 and is located 25.5″ along a position angle of 0° (as of 1998). CPD −81°900 is a foreground object, having a higher parallax and different proper motion.
