= NGC 7095 =

Galaxy in the constellation Octans

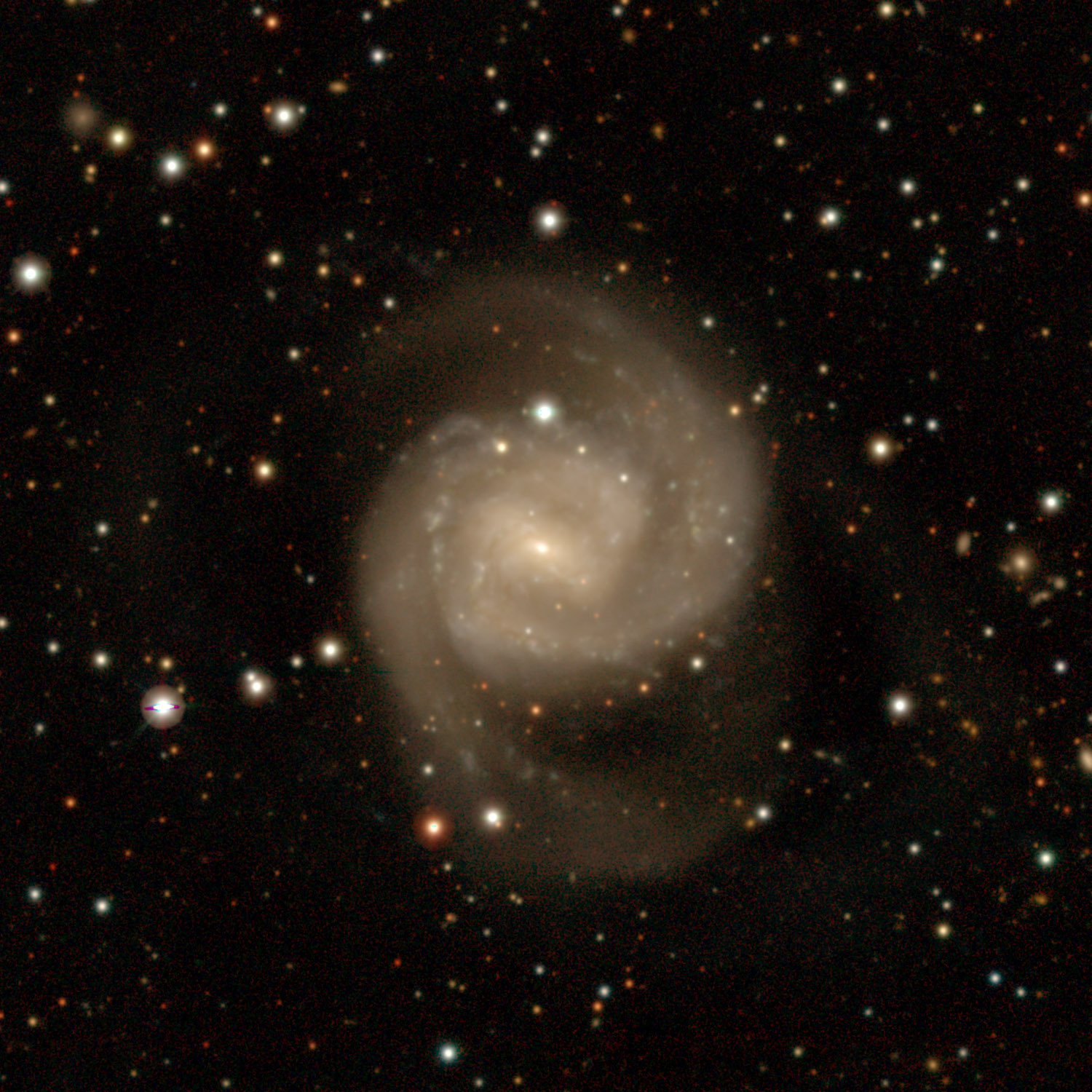
- legacy surveys image of NGC 7095

Observation data (J2000 epoch)
- Constellation: Octans
- Right ascension: 21^{h} 52^{m} 26.4^{s}
- Declination: −81° 31′ 51″
- Redshift: 0.008573
- Heliocentric radial velocity: 2,570 km/s
- Distance: 114.5 Mly
- Apparent magnitude (V): 12.23

Characteristics
- Type: SB(s)c
- Apparent size (V): 2.8' x 2.7'

Other designations
- ESO 027-G001, ESO 27-1, FAIR 353, IRAS 21457-8145, PGC 67546

NGC 7095 is a barred spiral galaxy located about 115 million light-years away in the constellation of Octans. NGC 7095 was discovered by astronomer John Herschel on September 21, 1837.
