= Omega Octantis =

Star in the constellation of Octans

ω Octantis
- Location of ω Oct (circled)

Observation data Epoch J2000.0 Equinox J2000.0 (ICRS)
- Constellation: Octans
- Right ascension: 15^{h} 11^{m} 08.79214^{s}
- Declination: −84° 47′ 16.0295″
- Apparent magnitude (V): 5.87±0.01

Characteristics
- Evolutionary stage: main sequence
- Spectral type: B9.5 V
- U−B color index: −0.13
- B−V color index: −0.06

Astrometry
Radial velocity (R_{v})	−7.6±3 km/s
Proper motion (μ)	RA: +2.984 mas/yr Dec.: −9.385 mas/yr
Parallax (π)	9.9406±0.0591 mas
Distance	328 ± 2 ly (100.6 ± 0.6 pc)
Absolute magnitude (M_{V})	+0.94

Details
Mass	2.54 M_{☉}
Radius	2.35±0.06 R_{☉}
Luminosity	50.5^{+2.5}_{−2.4} L_{☉}
Surface gravity (log g)	4.21 cgs
Temperature	10,759±366 K
Metallicity [Fe/H]	0.00 dex
Rotational velocity (v sin i)	36 km/s
Age	197 Myr

Other designations
- ω Oct, 23 G. Octantis, CPD−84°490, GC 20223, HD 131596, HIP 74296, HR 5557, SAO 258717

Database references
SIMBAD	data

Omega Octantis, (latinized from ω Octantis), is a solitary, bluish-white hued star located in the southern circumpolar constellation Octans. It has an apparent magnitude of 5.87, allowing it to be faintly seen with the naked eye. Based on the object's parallax measurements, it is estimated to be 328 light years distant. However, it is drifting closer with a heliocentric radial velocity −7.6 km/s.

Omega Octantis has a stellar classification of B9.5 V, indicating that it is a main-sequence star between the B9 and A0 classes. Helmut A. Abt & Nidia I. Morrell gave a slightly updated class of B9.5 Vs, which includes sharp (narrow) absorption lines in Omega Octantis' spectrum due to slow rotation. It has a mass 2.54 times that of the Sun and is calculated to be 197 million years old, having completed 40% of its main sequence lifetime. It has a luminosity of 50.5 L_{☉}, which comes from a radius of 2.35 R_{☉} and an effective temperature of 10,759 K. In 2012, George A. Gontcharov calculated a solar metallicity for Omega Octantis, and it is spinning modestly with a projected rotational velocity of 36 km/s. The slow rotation is consistent with the spectral classification from Abt & Morell (1995).
