= HD 11025 =

G-type star in the constellation Octans

Observation data Epoch J2000.0 Equinox ICRS
- Constellation: Octans
- Right ascension: 01^{h} 37^{m} 28.036^{s}
- Declination: −84° 46′ 10.62″
- Apparent magnitude (V): 5.67±0.01

Characteristics
- Spectral type: G8 III
- U−B color index: +0.66
- B−V color index: +0.94

Astrometry
Radial velocity (R_{v})	18±2 km/s
Proper motion (μ)	RA: +34.227 mas/yr Dec.: +26.193 mas/yr
Parallax (π)	8.6392±0.1495 mas
Distance	378 ± 7 ly (116 ± 2 pc)
Absolute magnitude (M_{V})	+0.33

Details
Mass	2.61±0.13 M_{☉}
Radius	9.52±0.24 R_{☉}
Luminosity	56±2 L_{☉}
Surface gravity (log g)	2.96±0.08 cgs
Temperature	5,128±46 K
Metallicity [Fe/H]	0.00±0.04 dex
Rotational velocity (v sin i)	7.5±1 km/s
Age	500 Myr

Other designations
- 4 G. Octantis, CPD−85°17, FK5 916, GC 2092, HD 11025, HIP 7568, HR 525, SAO 258273

Database references
SIMBAD	data

HD 11025 (HR 525) is a suspected astrometric binary in the southern circumpolar constellation Octans. It has an apparent magnitude of 5.67, making it visible to the naked eye if viewed under ideal conditions. Located 378 light years away, it is receding with a heliocentric radial velocity of 18 km/s.

The visible component is a yellow giant of spectral class G8 III. At present it has 2.61 times the mass of the Sun but at an age of 500 million years, has expanded to 9.52 times the radius of the Sun. It shines at 56 L_{☉} from its enlarged photosphere at an effective temperature of 5,128 K, giving it a yellow glow. HD 11025 has a solar metallicity and spins with a moderate projected rotational velocity of 7.5 km/s.
