= HD 104555 =

High proper motion star; K-type giant + F-type

Observation data Epoch J2000.0 Equinox ICRS
- Constellation: Octans
- Right ascension: 12^{h} 02^{m} 20.23931^{s}
- Declination: −85° 37′ 54.3264″
- Apparent magnitude (V): 6.02±0.01

Characteristics
- Evolutionary stage: horizontal branch
- Spectral type: K3 III
- U−B color index: +1.54
- B−V color index: +1.29

Astrometry
Radial velocity (R_{v})	17.1±0.4 km/s
Proper motion (μ)	RA: −57.259 mas/yr Dec.: +1.452 mas/yr
Parallax (π)	9.7144±0.0241 mas
Distance	335.7 ± 0.8 ly (102.9 ± 0.3 pc)
Absolute magnitude (M_{V})	+0.78

Details
Mass	2.18^{+0.02}_{−0.01} M_{☉}
Radius	9.82^{+1.95}_{−0.92} R_{☉}
Luminosity	59.8 L_{☉}
Temperature	4,497±122 K
Metallicity [Fe/H]	−0.06^{+0.11}_{−0.08} dex
Rotational velocity (v sin i)	<1 km/s
Age	955^{+68}_{−42} Myr

Other designations
- 12 G. Octantis, CPD−84°371, FK5 3983, GC 16449, HD 104555, HIP 58697, HR 4595, SAO 258632, WDS J12023-8538A

Database references
SIMBAD	data

HD 104555, also known as HR 4595, is a star located in the southern circumpolar constellation Octans. It has an apparent magnitude of 6.02, allowing it to be faintly visible to the naked eye. Based on parallax measurements from Gaia Data Release 3, it is estimated to be 336 light years distant. It appears to be receding from the Solar System, having a heliocentric radial velocity of 17.1 km/s.

This is an evolved, orange hued giant star with a stellar classification of K3 III. It is currently on the horizontal branch, generating energy via helium fusion at its core. It has twice the mass of the Sun but at 955 million years old, it has expanded to 9.82 times its girth. It radiates 60 times the luminosity of the Sun from its photosphere at an effective temperature of 4,497 K. HD 10455 has an iron abundance 12% below solar levels, making it slightly metal deficient. Like most giants, it spins slowly, having a projected rotational velocity lower than 1 km/s.

HIP 58713 is an 8th magnitude co-moving star located 24.8″ away along a position angle of 146°. It is a main sequence star with a spectral class of F8, and is estimated to be around the same distance as HD 104555.
