= HD 222060 =

High proper motion star: Class K

Observation data Epoch J2000.0 Equinox ICRS
- Constellation: Octans
- Right ascension: 23^{h} 38^{m} 23.88625^{s}
- Declination: −76° 52′ 10.3567″
- Apparent magnitude (V): 5.98±0.01

Characteristics
- Evolutionary stage: red giant branch
- Spectral type: K0 II/III
- U−B color index: +0.65
- B−V color index: +0.90

Astrometry
Radial velocity (R_{v})	2.3±0.5 km/s
Proper motion (μ)	RA: +83.519 mas/yr Dec.: −25.064 mas/yr
Parallax (π)	6.0864±0.0294 mas
Distance	536 ± 3 ly (164.3 ± 0.8 pc)
Absolute magnitude (M_{V})	−0.05

Details
Mass	3.20±0.10 M_{☉}
Radius	12.6±0.2 R_{☉}
Luminosity	102±3 L_{☉}
Surface gravity (log g)	2.85±0.06 cgs
Temperature	5,175±30 K
Metallicity [Fe/H]	+0.05±0.03 dex
Rotational velocity (v sin i)	3.7±1 km/s
Age	318^{+30}_{−40} Myr

Other designations
- 84 G. Octantis, CPD−77°1583, GC 32840, HD 222060, HIP 116653, HR 8957, SAO 258166

Database references
SIMBAD	data

HD 222060, also known as HR 8957, is a solitary, orange hued star located in the southern circumpolar constellation Octans. It has an apparent magnitude of 5.98, allowing it to be faintly visible to the naked eye. Based on parallax measurements from GAIA, the object is estimated to be 536 light years distant. It appears to be slowly receding from the Solar System, having a heliocentric radial velocity of 2.3 km/s.

This is an evolved giant star that is currently on the red giant branch, fusing a hydrogen shell around a helium core. HD 222060 a stellar classification of K0 II/III, a K-type star with the blended luminosity class of a giant and a bright giant. It has 3.2 times the mass of the Sun and is currently 318 million years old. Due to its high mass, the object has expanded to an enlarged radius of 12.6 R_{☉}. It radiates 102 times the luminosity of the Sun from its photosphere at an effective temperature of 5,175 K. HD 222060 has a near solar metallicity and spins modestly with a projected rotational velocity of 3.7 km/s.
