= HD 222806 =

Suspected binary in the constellation Octans

Observation data Epoch J2000.0 Equinox ICRS
- Constellation: Octans
- Right ascension: 23^{h} 44^{m} 40.8646^{s}
- Declination: −78° 47′ 29.186″
- Apparent magnitude (V): 5.74±0.01

Characteristics
- Spectral type: K1 III
- U−B color index: +1.06
- B−V color index: +1.11

Astrometry
Radial velocity (R_{v})	21.3±0.8 km/s
Proper motion (μ)	RA: +49.327 mas/yr Dec.: +7.345 mas/yr
Parallax (π)	5.7766±0.0592 mas
Distance	565 ± 6 ly (173 ± 2 pc)
Absolute magnitude (M_{V})	−0.11

Details
Mass	1.26 M_{☉}
Radius	18.77 R_{☉}
Luminosity	151±2 L_{☉}
Surface gravity (log g)	1.95 cgs
Temperature	4,865±122 K
Metallicity [Fe/H]	+0.37 dex
Rotational velocity (v sin i)	<1 km/s

Other designations
- 85 G. Octantis, CPD−79°1239, FK5 3906, GC 32960, HD 222806, HIP 117125, HR 8995, SAO 258179

Database references
SIMBAD	data

HD 222806 (HR 8995) is a suspected astrometric binary in the southern circumpolar constellation Octans. It has an apparent magnitude of 5.74, allowing it to be faintly seen with the naked eye. Parallax measurements place the system at a distance of 565 light years and it is currently receding with a heliocentric radial velocity of 21 km/s.

The visible component has a stellar classification of K1 III, indicating that it is a red giant. At present it has 126% the mass of the Sun, but has expanded to almost 19 times its girth. It radiates at 151 times the luminosity of the Sun from its enlarged photosphere at an effective temperature of 4,865 K, giving it an orange hue. HD 222806 is metal enriched with an iron abundance over twice that of the Sun and is believed to be a member of the young disk population. It spins with a projected rotational velocity lower than 1 km/s.
