= HD 1032 =

Star in the constellation Octans

Observation data Epoch J2000.0 Equinox J2000.0 (ICRS)
- Constellation: Octans
- Right ascension: 00^{h} 13^{m} 19.6219^{s}
- Declination: −84° 59′ 38.318″
- Apparent magnitude (V): 5.77

Characteristics
- Evolutionary stage: AGB
- Spectral type: M0/1 III
- U−B color index: +2.10
- B−V color index: +1.72
- Variable type: suspected

Astrometry
Radial velocity (R_{v})	4±0.4 km/s
Proper motion (μ)	RA: +11.046 mas/yr Dec.: +17.696 mas/yr
Parallax (π)	3.8517±0.0501 mas
Distance	850 ± 10 ly (260 ± 3 pc)
Absolute magnitude (M_{V})	−1.57

Details
Mass	1.11 M_{☉}
Radius	95.54 R_{☉}
Luminosity	1,461 L_{☉}
Surface gravity (log g)	0.69 cgs
Temperature	3,838±122 K
Metallicity [Fe/H]	−0.08 dex

Other designations
- 2 G. Octantis, CPD−85°2, FK5 3972, GC 257, HD 1032, HIP 1074, HR 47, SAO 258217

Database references
SIMBAD	data

HD 1032 (HR 47) is a solitary star in the southern circumpolar constellation Octans. It is faintly visible to the naked eye with an apparent magnitude of 5.77 and is estimated to be 850 light years away from the Solar System based on parallax measure. However, it is receding with a heliocentric radial velocity of 4 km/s.

HD 1032 is an asymptotic giant branch star with a stellar classification of M0/1 III — intermediate between a M0 and M1 giant star. It has 111% the mass of the Sun and an enlarged radius of 95.54 R_{☉} as a result of its evolved state. It radiates at 1,461 times the luminosity of the Sun from its photosphere at an effective temperature of 3,838 K, giving a red hue. HD 1032 is slightly metal deficient with an iron abundance 83% that of the Sun.

This is a suspected variable star that fluctuates between magnitudes 5.82 and 5.88 in the Hipparcos passband.
