= Zeta Octantis =

High proper motion star in Octans

ζ Octantis
- Location of ζ Octantis (circled)

Observation data Epoch J2000.0 Equinox J2000.0 (ICRS)
- Constellation: Octans
- Right ascension: 08^{h} 56^{m} 40.97572^{s}
- Declination: −85° 39′ 47.3476″
- Apparent magnitude (V): 5.42±0.01

Characteristics
- Spectral type: A8/9 IV or F0 III
- U−B color index: +0.07
- B−V color index: +0.31

Astrometry
Radial velocity (R_{v})	−3.6±2 km/s
Proper motion (μ)	RA: −117.699 mas/yr Dec.: +33.964 mas/yr
Parallax (π)	20.9964±0.0776 mas
Distance	155.3 ± 0.6 ly (47.6 ± 0.2 pc)
Absolute magnitude (M_{V})	+1.95

Details
Mass	2.06±0.40 M_{☉}
Radius	2.25±0.11 R_{☉}
Luminosity	12.63±0.09 L_{☉}
Surface gravity (log g)	4.04±0.28 cgs
Temperature	7,063±325 K
Metallicity [Fe/H]	−0.36 dex
Rotational velocity (v sin i)	115 km/s
Age	1.25 Gyr

Other designations
- ζ Oct, 9 G. Octantis, CPD−85°183, FK5 918, GC 12580, HD 79837, HIP 43908, HR 3678, SAO 258515

Database references
SIMBAD	data

Zeta Octantis, Latinized from ζ Octantis, is a solitary, yellowish-white hued star located in the southern circumpolar constellation Octans. It has an apparent magnitude of 5.42, making it faintly visible to the naked eye under ideal conditions. The star is located relatively close at a distance of only 156 light-years based on Gaia DR3 parallax measurements, but is drifting closer with a radial velocity of −3.6 km/s. At its current distance, Zeta Octantis' brightness is diminished by 0.25 magnitudes due to interstellar dust.

This is an evolved A-type star with a stellar classification of A8/9 IV. David S. Evans and colleagues, however, give it a classification of F0 III, which suggests it is already an evolved giant star. It has double the Sun's mass, and 2.25 times the Sun's radius. It radiates around 13 times the luminosity of the Sun from its photosphere at an effective temperature of 7,063 K. Zeta Octantis is estimated to be 1.25 billion years olds based on stellar evolution models by Trevor J. David and Lynne A. Hillenbrand. It has a low metallicity, having only 44% the abundance of heavy metals compared to the Sun. Despite its advanced age, the object spins rapidly with a projected rotational velocity of 115 km/s, resulting in an oblate shape with an equatorial bulge 11% larger than the polar radius.
