= HR 8526 =

Star in the constellation Octans

Observation data Epoch J2000.0 Equinox ICRS
- Constellation: Octans
- A
- Right ascension: 22^{h} 25^{m} 51.15504^{s}
- Declination: −75° 00′ 56.4763″
- Apparent magnitude (V): 6.12±0.01
- B
- Right ascension: 22^{h} 25^{m} 56.54954^{s}
- Declination: −75° 00′ 52.3437″
- Apparent magnitude (V): 9.35

Characteristics

A
- Evolutionary stage: main sequence
- Spectral type: G0 V
- U−B color index: +0.14
- B−V color index: +0.64

B
- Spectral type: K2V

Astrometry

A
Radial velocity (R_{v})	15±0.2 km/s
Proper motion (μ)	RA: +57.385 mas/yr Dec.: +12.835 mas/yr
Parallax (π)	42.7219±0.0196 mas
Distance	76.34 ± 0.04 ly (23.41 ± 0.01 pc)
Absolute magnitude (M_{V})	+4.31

B
Radial velocity (R_{v})	15±0.5 km/s
Proper motion (μ)	RA: +33.330 mas/yr Dec.: −3.785 mas/yr
Parallax (π)	42.692±0.2479 mas
Distance	76.4 ± 0.4 ly (23.4 ± 0.1 pc)
Absolute magnitude (M_{V})	+6.92

Orbit
Primary	Ba
Name	Bb
Period (P)	11 yr
Semi-major axis (a)	0.254″
Inclination (i)	87.3°
Longitude of the node (Ω)	235°
Periastron epoch (T)	2022.21
Argument of periastron (ω) (secondary)	270°

Details

A
Mass	1.05^{+0.04}_{−0.03} M_{☉}
Radius	1.17 R_{☉}
Luminosity	1.57 L_{☉}
Surface gravity (log g)	4.29±0.04 cgs
Temperature	5,935 K
Metallicity [Fe/H]	+0.02±0.06 dex
Rotational velocity (v sin i)	3.6 km/s
Age	4.7 Gyr

B
Mass	0.76 (combined) M_{☉}

Other designations
- 72 G. Octantis, CD−75°1241, CPD−75°1748, HD 212168, HR 8526, WDS J22259-7501AB
- A: FK5 3789, GC 31308, HIP 110712, SAO 258036
- B: HIP 110719

Database references
SIMBAD	A
- B

HR 8526, also known as HD 212168, is the primary of a triple star located in the southern circumpolar constellation Octans. The star and its companion have apparent magnitudes of 6.12 and 9.36 respectively. The system is located relatively close at a distance of 76 light years based on Gaia DR3 parallax measurements, but is receding with a heliocentric radial velocity of 15 km/s.

This is a Sun-like star with a stellar classification of G0 V. It has 105% the mass of the Sun and 117% its girth. It radiates 157% the luminosity of the Sun from its photosphere at an effective temperature of 5,935 K, giving it a whitish-yellow hue. HR 8526 has an iron abundance similar to the Sun's and spins modestly with a projected rotational velocity of 3.6 km/s. HD 212168 has a similar age to the Sun; the former is 4.7 billion years old while the latter is 4.6 billion years old.

The B subsystem is located 14″ away along a position angle of 78°. It has a combined mass 76% that of the Sun and take roughly 11 years to orbit each other. Spectral classifications for this star vary from G0-V to K2V. The G0 class has been used as an argument that the two visible components form a purely optical pair, but this has been dismissed as mis-identification or contamination and that the actual spectral class is early or mid K.

DENIS J222644.3-750342 is a cool M8 red dwarf located 264 arcseconds away from HR 8526. In 2012, J.A. Caballero identified it as a companion to the AB system, making it a quadruple star system.
