= CW Octantis =

Star in the constellation of Octans

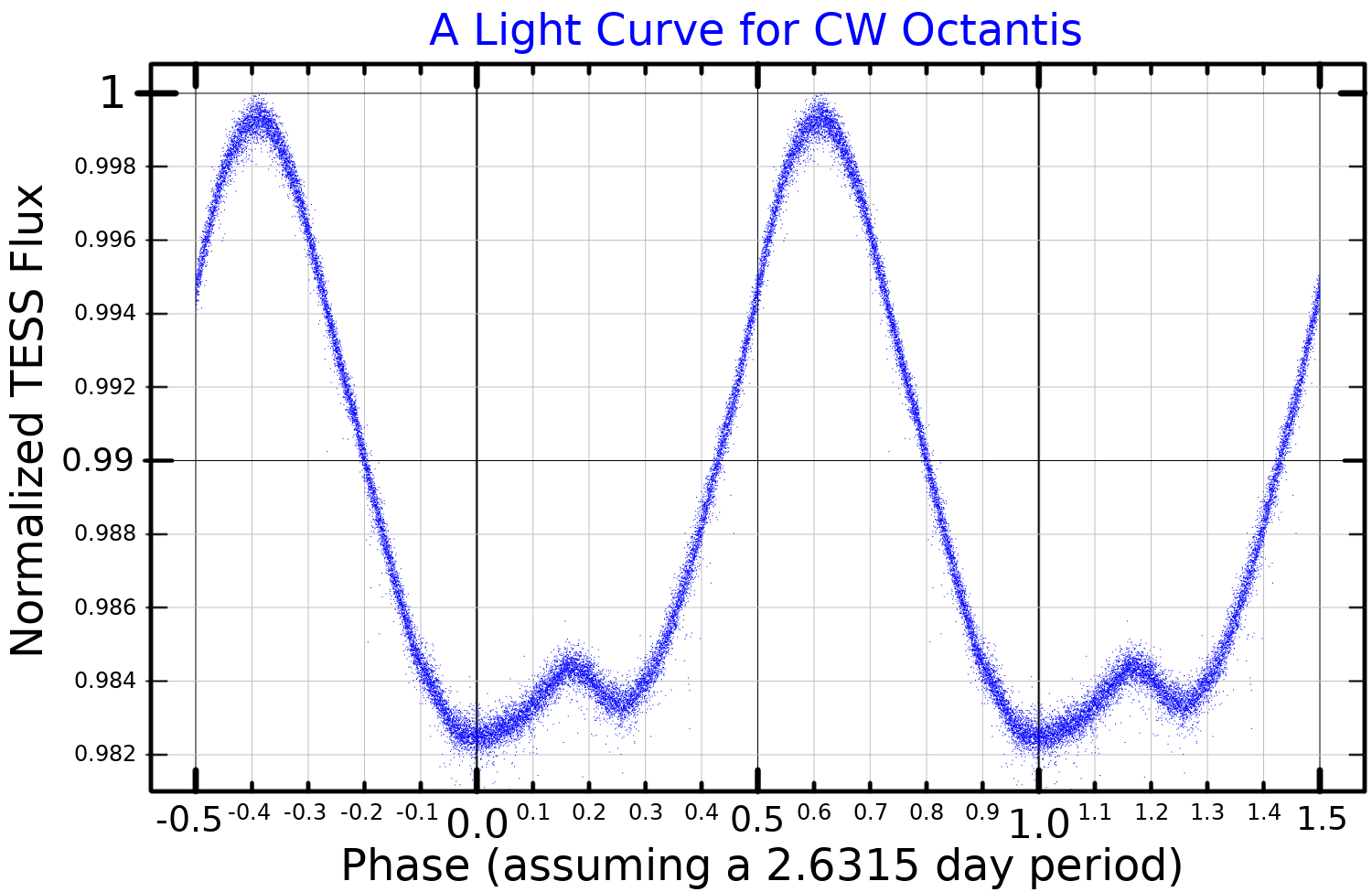
- A light curve for CW Octantis, plotted from TESS data

Observation data Epoch J2000.0 Equinox ICRS
- Constellation: Octans
- Right ascension: 17^{h} 00^{m} 58.51777^{s}
- Declination: −86° 21′ 51.4707″
- Apparent magnitude (V): 6.03±0.01

Characteristics
- Evolutionary stage: subgiant
- Spectral type: A3 IV
- U−B color index: +0.02
- B−V color index: +0.05
- Variable type: α^{2} CVn

Astrometry
Radial velocity (R_{v})	7.1±0.5 km/s
Proper motion (μ)	RA: +8.413 mas/yr Dec.: −0.032 mas/yr
Parallax (π)	5.1828±0.0486 mas
Distance	629 ± 6 ly (193 ± 2 pc)
Absolute magnitude (M_{V})	−0.36

Details
Mass	2.98±0.05 M_{☉}
Radius	4.64 R_{☉}
Luminosity	111 L_{☉}
Surface gravity (log g)	3.45±0.07 cgs
Temperature	8,791 K
Metallicity [Fe/H]	+0.6 dex
Rotation	≈2.8 days
Rotational velocity (v sin i)	92±6 km/s
Age	188±4 Myr

Other designations
- 26 G. Octantis, CW Octantis, CD−86°100, CPD−86°333, FK5 921, GC 22519, HD 148542, HIP 83255, HR 6139, SAO 258751

Database references
SIMBAD	data

CW Octantis, also known as HD 148542, is a solitary, white hued variable star located in the southern circumpolar constellation Octans. It has an apparent magnitude of 6.03, allowing it to be faintly visible to the naked eye. Parallax measurements from Gaia DR3 place the object at a distance of 629 light years. It appears to be receding from the Solar System with a heliocentric radial velocity of 7.1 km/s.

CW Octantis has a stellar classification of A3 IV, indicating that it is an evolved A-type star heading towards the red giant branch. Zorec and Royer (2012) model it as a dwarf star that has just reached the end of its main sequence lifetime. It has 2.98 times the mass of the Sun and 4.6 times its radius. It radiates 111 times the luminosity of the Sun from its photosphere at an effective temperature of 8,791 K. CW Octantis is estimated to be 188 million years old.

This object is classified as a Alpha^{2} Canum Venaticorum variable. Most stars of this class have chemical peculiarities in their spectra, but CW Octantis seems to be ordinary. Renson and Manfroid (2009) consider its peculiarity status to be doubtful. Nevertheless, CW Octantis fluctuates between 6.05 and 6.07 in the Hipparcos passband within 2.63 days. It takes 2.8 days to complete a full a rotation, which corresponds to a projected rotational velocity of 92 km/s.
