= Phi Octantis =

Star in the constellation Octans

φ Octantis
- Location of Phi Oct on the map (circled)

Observation data Epoch J2000.0 Equinox ICRS
- Constellation: Octans
- Right ascension: 18^{h} 23^{m} 36.44874^{s}
- Declination: −75° 02′ 39.3975″
- Apparent magnitude (V): 5.46±0.01

Characteristics
- Spectral type: A0 V
- U−B color index: +0.04
- B−V color index: +0.02

Astrometry
Radial velocity (R_{v})	5.0±4.2 km/s
Proper motion (μ)	RA: +4.621 mas/yr Dec.: +19.730 mas/yr
Parallax (π)	16.8258±0.0636 mas
Distance	193.8 ± 0.7 ly (59.4 ± 0.2 pc)
Absolute magnitude (M_{V})	+1.60

Details
Mass	2.86 M_{☉}
Radius	1.74±0.08 R_{☉}
Luminosity	21.1±0.1 L_{☉}
Surface gravity (log g)	4.48±0.14 cgs
Temperature	9,352±122 K
Metallicity [Fe/H]	−0.22 dex
Rotational velocity (v sin i)	295 km/s
Age	7 Myr

Other designations
- φ Oct, 33 G. Octantis, CPD−75°1417, GC 24999, HD 167468, HIP 90133, HR 6829, SAO 257584

Database references
SIMBAD	data

Phi Octantis, Latinized from φ Octantis, is a solitary star located in the southern circumpolar constellation Octans. It has an apparent magnitude of 5.46, making it faintly visible to the naked eye if viewed under ideal conditions. The object is located relatively close at a distance of 194 light years based on Gaia DR3 parallax measurements, but it is receding with a heliocentric radial velocity of approximately 5 km/s. At its current distance, Phi Octantis' brightness is diminished by 0.26 magnitudes due to interstellar extinction and it has an absolute magnitude of +1.60.

Phi Octantis has a stellar classification of A0 V, indicating that it is an ordinary A-type main-sequence star that is generating energy via hydrogen fusion at is core. At present it has 2.7 times the mass of the Sun and 1.74 times the radius of the Sun. It radiates at 21.1 times the luminosity of the Sun from its photosphere at an effective temperature of 9,352 K, giving it a white hue when viewed in the night sky. Phi Octantis is a relatively young star with an age of only 7 million years and it spins rapidly with a projected rotational velocity of 295 km/s. It has a metallicity only 60% of the Sun's at [Fe/H] = −0.22.
