= HD 204904 =

Spectroscopic binary in the constellation Octans

- Location of HD 204904 on the map (circled)

Observation data Epoch J2000.0 Equinox J2000.0 (ICRS)
- Constellation: Octans
- Right ascension: 21^{h} 38^{m} 56.38010^{s}
- Declination: −79° 26′ 33.2989″
- Apparent magnitude (V): 6.17±0.01

Characteristics
- Spectral type: F6 IV or F4 IV
- U−B color index: +0.02
- B−V color index: +0.46

Astrometry
Radial velocity (R_{v})	−5.2±0.5 km/s
Proper motion (μ)	RA: +71.185 mas/yr Dec.: −26.928 mas/yr
Parallax (π)	15.369±0.0195 mas
Distance	212.2 ± 0.3 ly (65.07 ± 0.08 pc)
Absolute magnitude (M_{V})	+2.13

Details
Mass	1.53 M_{☉}
Radius	2.87±0.15 R_{☉}
Luminosity	12.1±0.1 L_{☉}
Surface gravity (log g)	3.67^{+0.10}_{−0.09} cgs
Temperature	6,443±80 K
Metallicity [Fe/H]	−0.20±0.06 dex
Rotational velocity (v sin i)	12±1.6 km/s
Age	2.56 Gyr

Other designations
- 59 G. Octantis, CD−79°856, CPD−79°1158, FK5 3723, GC 30221, HD 204904, HIP 106881, HR 8234, SAO 257942, TIC 354944747

Database references
SIMBAD	data

HD 204904 (HR 8234; 59 G. Octantis) is a spectroscopic binary located in the southern circumpolar constellation Octans. It has an apparent magnitude of 6.17, placing it near the limit for naked eye visibility, even under ideal conditions. The object is located relatively close at distance of 212 light-years based on Gaia DR3 parallax measurements and it is drifting closer with a heliocentric radial velocity of −5.2 km/s. At its current distance, HD 204904's brightness is diminished by 0.19 magnitudes due to interstellar extinction and it has an absolute magnitude of +2.13.

HD 204904 has a stellar classification of either F6 IV or F4 IV, indicating that it is a slightly evolved F-type subgiant. It has 1.53 times the mass of the Sun and a slightly enlarged radius 2.87 times that of the Sun's. It radiates 12.1 times the luminosity of the Sun from its photosphere at an effective temperature of 6,443 K, giving it the typical yellowish-white hue of an F-type star. HD 204904 is metal deficient with an iron abundance of [Fe/H] = −0.20 or 63.1% of the Sun's iron abundance. It is estimated to be 2.56 billion years old and it spins modestly with a projected rotational velocity of 12 km/s.

In 2014, J. R. De Medeiros and colleagues detected radial velocity variations from the star, indicating that it was a spectroscopic binary. However, the system does not have a defined orbit.
