= HD 194612 =

Star in the constellation Octans

Observation data Epoch J2000.0 Equinox ICRS
- Constellation: Octans
- Right ascension: 20^{h} 38^{m} 18.6064^{s}
- Declination: −81° 17′ 20.626″
- Apparent magnitude (V): 5.89±0.01

Characteristics
- Evolutionary stage: RGB
- Spectral type: K5 III
- U−B color index: +2.02
- B−V color index: +1.71

Astrometry
Radial velocity (R_{v})	0.3±0.4 km/s
Proper motion (μ)	RA: +1.597 mas/yr Dec.: −37.819 mas/yr
Parallax (π)	4.3006±0.0707 mas
Distance	760 ± 10 ly (233 ± 4 pc)
Absolute magnitude (M_{V})	−0.56

Details
Mass	2.1 M_{☉}
Radius	59.9 R_{☉}
Luminosity	598±13 L_{☉}
Surface gravity (log g)	0.99±0.02 cgs
Temperature	3941±122 K
Rotational velocity (v sin i)	2.3±1.2 km/s

Other designations
- 49 G. Octantis, CPD−81°906, GC 28578, HD 194612, HIP 101843, HR 7812, SAO 258864

Database references
SIMBAD	data

HD 194612 (HR 7812) is a solitary orange hued star located in the southern circumpolar constellation Octans. It has an apparent magnitude of 5.9, making it visible to the naked eye under ideal conditions. Parallax measurements place it at a distance of 760 light years and it has a low heliocentric radial velocity of 0.3 km/s.

This is a red giant with a stellar classification of K5 III, and Gaia DR3 stellar evolution models place it on the red giant branch. It has double the mass of the Sun and an enlarged radius of 59.9 R_{☉} due to its evolved status. It shines with a luminosity of 598 L_{☉} from its photosphere at an effective temperature of 3,941 K. Like many giants, HD 194612 has a comparatively modest projected rotational velocity, which is around 2.3 km/s.
