= HD 218108 =

Star in the constellation of Octans

Observation data Epoch J2000.0 Equinox J2000.0 (ICRS)
- Constellation: Octans
- Right ascension: 23^{h} 08^{m} 23.84044^{s}
- Declination: −79° 28′ 50.4748″
- Apparent magnitude (V): 6.11±0.01

Characteristics
- Evolutionary stage: main sequence
- Spectral type: A6 Vn
- U−B color index: +0.10
- B−V color index: +0.14

Astrometry
| Radial velocity (R_{v}) | −7±4.4 km/s |
| Proper motion (μ) | RA: +93.016 mas/yr Dec.: −35.907 mas/yr |
| Parallax (π) | 13.1893±0.0236 mas |
| Distance | 247.3 ± 0.4 ly (75.8 ± 0.1 pc) |
| Absolute magnitude (M_{V}) | +1.78 |

Details
| Mass | 1.80 M_{☉} |
| Radius | 2±0.1 R_{☉} |
| Luminosity | 15.24 L_{☉} |
| Surface gravity (log g) | 4.17±0.07 cgs |
| Temperature | 8,213±244 K |
| Metallicity [Fe/H] | −0.01 dex |
| Rotational velocity (v sin i) | 194±2 km/s |
| Age | 249 Myr |

Other designations
- 79 G. Octantis, CPD−80°1064, FK5 3847, GC 32194, HD 218108, HIP 114258, HR 8786, SAO 258105

Database references
| SIMBAD | data |

HD 218108, also known as HR 8786, is a solitary, white hued star located in the southern circumpolar constellation Octans. It has an apparent magnitude of 6.11, making it faintly visible to the naked eye under ideal conditions. Based on parallax measurements from Gaia DR3, the object is estimated to be 247 light years away. It appears to be approaching the Solar System with a fairly constrained radial velocity of −7 km/s. Paunzen et al. (2001) lists it as a λ Boötis star with a weak magnesium line.

HD 218108 has a stellar classification of A6 Vn, indicating that it is an A-type main-sequence star with broad or nebulous absorption lines due to rapid rotation. In 1966, David Stanley Evans gave it a slightly cooler class of A7 Vn. However, Houk and Cowley (1975) give it a classification of A3/4 V, a main sequence star with the characteristics of an A3 and A4 star. Paunzen et al. (2001) gives it a class of A3 V, indicating that it is instead an ordinary A-type main-sequence star.

Nevertheless, it has 1.8 times the mass of the Sun and twice its radius. It radiates 15.24 times the luminosity of the Sun from its photosphere at an effective temperature of 8,213 K. It is estimated to be 249 million years old and is currently spinning with a high projected rotational velocity of 149 km/s. A solar metallicity was calculated for HD 218108.
