= Southern celestial hemisphere =

Southern half of the celestial sphere

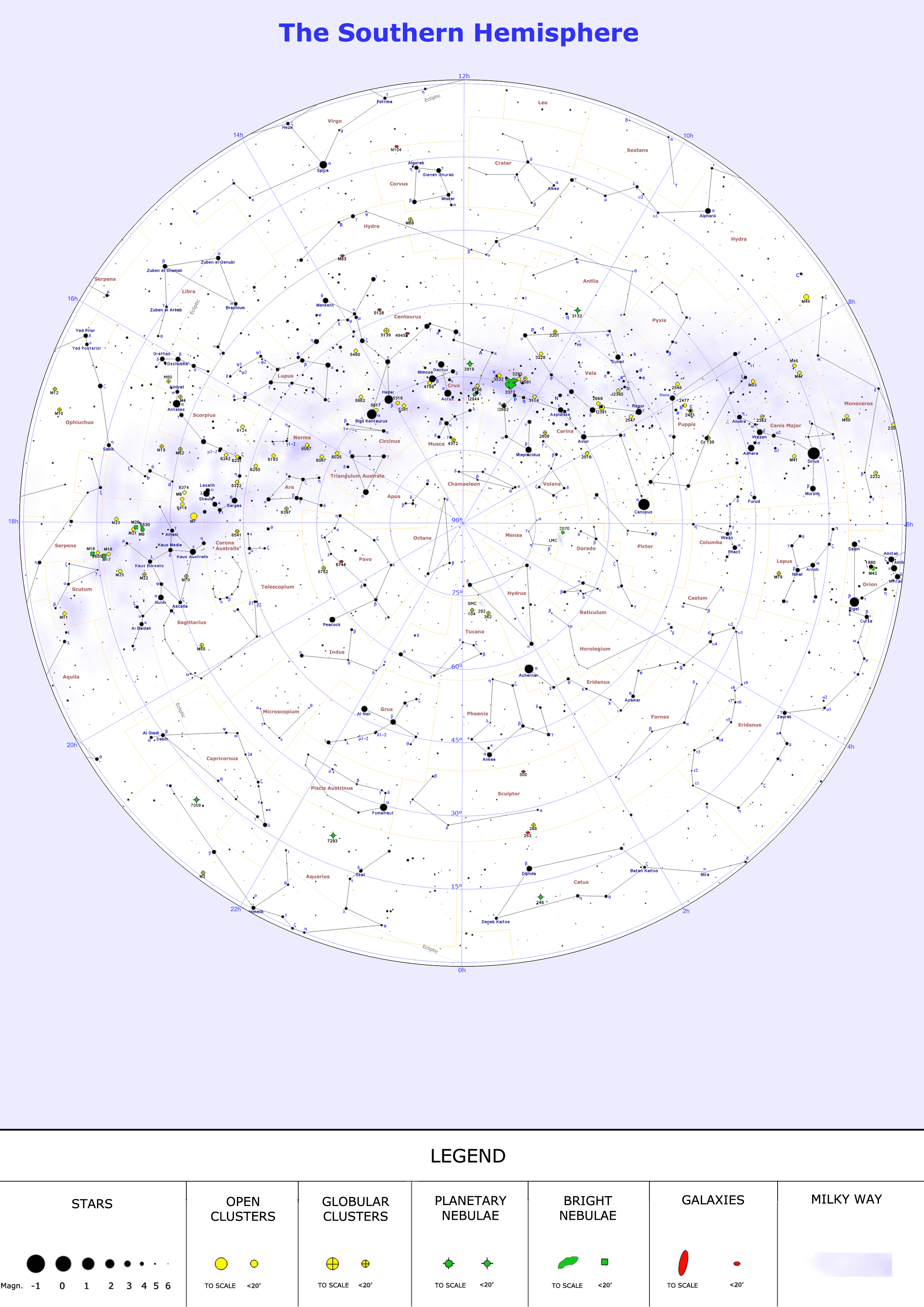
A star chart of the entire Southern Sky, centered on the south celestial pole

The southern celestial hemisphere, also called the Southern Sky, is the southern half of the celestial sphere. Most easily viewed from Earth's Southern Hemisphere, the hemisphere appears to rotate westward (clockwise) around a polar axis as the Earth rotates.

The entire Southern Sky is visible from the geographic South Pole; less of it is visible at more northward latitudes. The northern counterpart is the northern celestial hemisphere.

== Astronomy ==
Earth rotating within the celestial sphere. In this view, the southern celestial hemisphere is below the celestial equator, the middle parallel (in cyan).

In the context of astronomical discussions or writing about celestial mapping, it may also simply then be referred to as the Southern Hemisphere.

For the purpose of celestial mapping, the sky is considered by astronomers as the inside of a sphere divided in two halves by the celestial equator. The Southern Sky or Southern Hemisphere is, therefore, that half of the celestial sphere that is south of the celestial equator. Even if this one is the ideal projection of the terrestrial equatorial onto the imaginary celestial sphere, the Northern and Southern celestial hemispheres should not be confused with descriptions of the terrestrial hemispheres of Earth itself.

== Observation ==
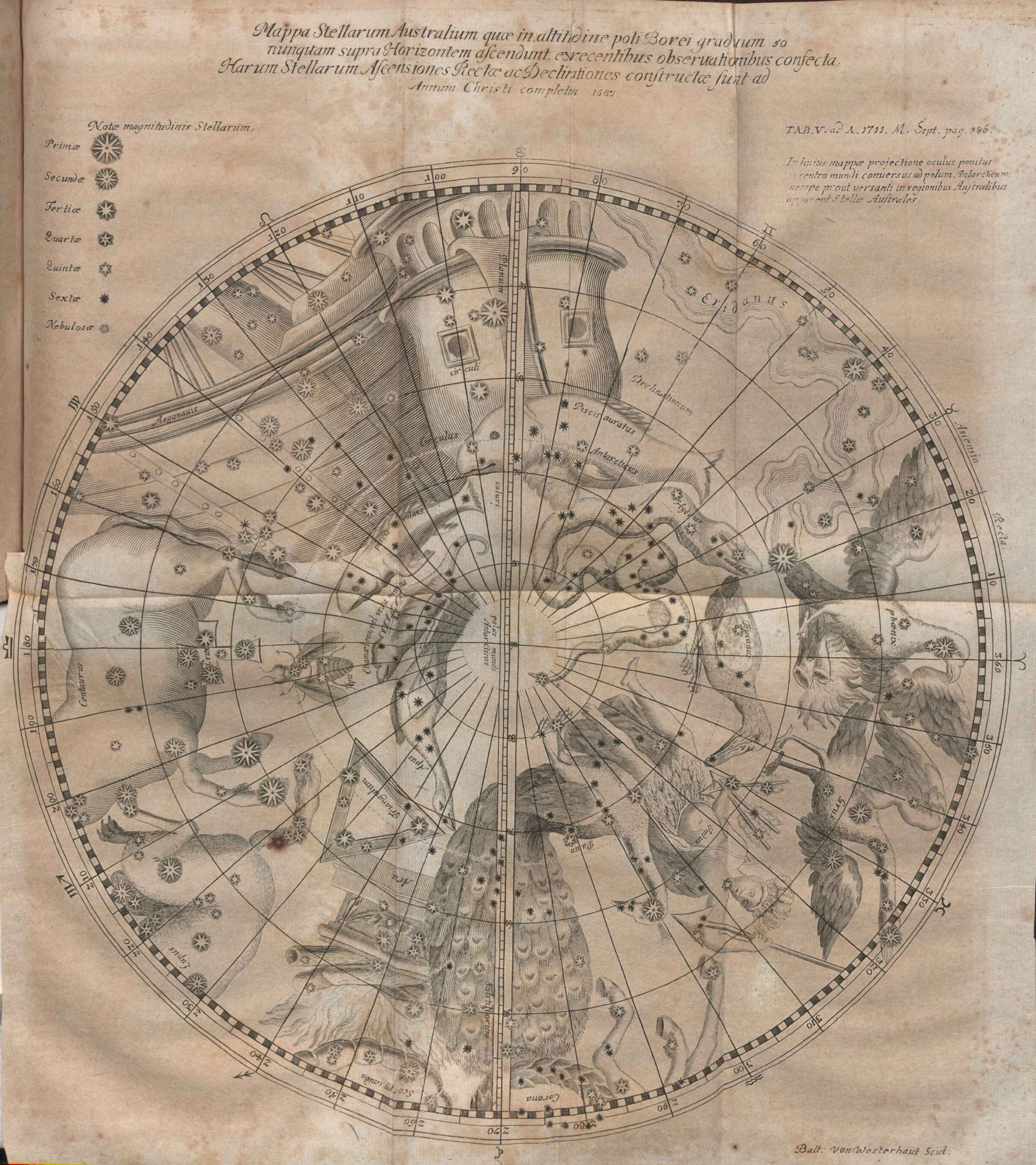
Chart of the southern constellations from declination –40° to the south celestial pole by the Jesuit missionary François Noël published in Acta Eruditorum, 1711.

From the South Pole, in good visibility conditions, the Southern Sky features over 2,000 fixed stars that are easily visible to the naked eye, while about 20,000 to 40,000 with the aided eye. In large cities, about 300 to 500 stars can be seen depending on the extent of light and air pollution. The farther north, the fewer are visible to the observer.

The brightest star in the night sky is located in the southern celestial hemisphere and is larger than the Sun. Sirius in the constellation of Canis Major has the brightest apparent magnitude of −1.46; it has a radius twice that of the Sun and is 8.6 light-years away. Canopus and the next fixed star α Centauri, 4.2 light-years away, are also located in the Southern Sky, having declinations around −60°; too close to the south celestial pole for either to be visible from Central Europe. The faint Sigma Octantis acts as the southern pole star, similar to Polaris in the northern celestial hemisphere. However, with an apparent magnitude of 5.47, it is too faint to be usable for navigation. Due to this, the constellation Crux is generally used for navigation instead.

Of the 88 modern constellations, 45 are only visible from the Southern celestial hemisphere with 15 other constellations along the equator and have portions on the northern hemisphere. The southern constellations are:

- Antlia
- Apus
- Aquarius
- Aquila
- Ara
- Caelum
- Canis Major
- Canis Minor
- Capricornus
- Carina
- Centaurus
- Cetus
- Chamaeleon
- Circinus
- Columba
- Corona Australis
- Corvus
- Crater
- Crux
- Dorado
- Eridanus
- Fornax
- Grus
- Horologium
- Hydra
- Hydrus
- Indus
- Leo
- Lepus
- Libra
- Lupus
- Mensa
- Monoceros
- Microscopium
- Musca
- Norma
- Octans
- Ophiuchus
- Orion
- Pavo
- Phoenix
- Pictor
- Pisces
- Piscis Austrinus
- Puppis
- Pyxis
- Reticulum
- Sagittarius
- Scorpius
- Sculptor
- Scutum
- Serpens
- Sextans
- Taurus
- Telescopium
- Triangulum Australe
- Tucana
- Vela
- Virgo
- Volans

== History ==
The first telescopic chart of the Southern Sky was made by the English astronomer Edmond Halley, from the island of St Helena in the South Atlantic Ocean and published by him in 1678.

== See also ==
- Astronomical coordinate systems
