= Kappa Octantis =

Am star in the constellation Octans

κ Octantis
Observation data Epoch J2000.0 Equinox J2000.0 (ICRS)
- Constellation: Octans
- Right ascension: 13^{h} 40^{m} 55.4833^{s}
- Declination: −85° 47′ 09.752″
- Apparent magnitude (V): 5.55±0.01

Characteristics
- Evolutionary stage: main sequence
- Spectral type: A2 mA5-A8
- U−B color index: +0.16
- B−V color index: +0.18

Astrometry
Radial velocity (R_{v})	−9.0±7.4 km/s
Proper motion (μ)	RA: −88.395 mas/yr Dec.: −23.285 mas/yr
Parallax (π)	11.4403±0.0849 mas
Distance	285 ± 2 ly (87.4 ± 0.6 pc)
Absolute magnitude (M_{V})	+0.95

Details
Mass	2.07±0.18 M_{☉}
Radius	2.75^{+0.13}_{−0.12} R_{☉}
Luminosity	34.83 L_{☉}
Surface gravity (log g)	3.9±0.1 cgs
Temperature	7,943^{+185}_{−181} K
Age	354 Myr

Other designations
- κ Oct, 18 G. Octantis, CPD−85°384, GC 18357, HD 117374, HIP 66753, HR 5084, SAO 258674

Database references
SIMBAD	data

Kappa Octantis, Latinized from κ Octantis, is a solitary star in the southern circumpolar constellation Octans. It has an apparent magnitude of 5.55, making it visible to the naked eye under ideal conditions. The object is located at a distance of 285 light years but is approaching the Solar System with a heliocentric radial velocity of −9 km/s.

Kappa Octanits is an Am star, making it difficult to classify. It has been given a stellar classification of A2 mA5-A8, indicating that it is an A2 star with the metallic lines of an A5-A8 star. At present it has 2.07 times the mass of the Sun and 2.75 its radius. It shines at a luminosity of about 35 L_{☉} from its photosphere at an effective temperature of 7,943 K, giving it a white glow. Kappa Octantis is said to be around 350 million years old.
