= HD 208741 =

Star in the constellation Octans

Observation data Epoch J2000 Equinox J2000
Constellation	Octans
- A
Right ascension	22^{h} 03^{m} 03.8227^{s}
Declination	−76° 07′ 06.453″
- Apparent magnitude (V): 5.93±0.01
- B
Right ascension	22^{h} 03^{m} 12.9150^{s}
Declination	−76° 06′ 54.860″
- Apparent magnitude (V): 10.57

Characteristics

A
- Evolutionary stage: main sequence
- Spectral type: F3 III
- U−B color index: +0.11
- B−V color index: +0.39

B
- Spectral type: K5
- B−V color index: +0.7

Astrometry
Radial velocity (R_{v})	8±1.1 km/s
Absolute magnitude (M_{V})	+1.96

A
Proper motion (μ)	RA: +24.821 mas/yr Dec.: −72.437 mas/yr
Parallax (π)	15.4736±0.0383 mas
Distance	210.8 ± 0.5 ly (64.6 ± 0.2 pc)

B
Proper motion (μ)	RA: +29.912 mas/yr Dec.: −71.414 mas/yr
Parallax (π)	15.5058 ± 0.0249 mas
Distance	210.3 ± 0.3 ly (64.5 ± 0.1 pc)

Details

A
Mass	1.52±0.25 M_{☉}
Radius	2.6±0.1 R_{☉}
Luminosity	12.9 L_{☉}
Surface gravity (log g)	3.89 cgs
Temperature	6,937±80 K
Metallicity [Fe/H]	+0.33 dex
Rotational velocity (v sin i)	36 km/s
Age	1.1±0.1 Gyr

Other designations
- 66 G. Octantis, CD−76°1113, CPD−76°1542, FK5 3760, GC 30788, HD 208741, HIP 108849, HR 8380, SAO 257993, WDS J22031-7607A

Database references
SIMBAD	A
- B

HD 208741, also known as HR 8380, is a yellowish-white hued star located in the southern circumpolar constellation Octans. It has an apparent magnitude of 5.91, making it faintly visible to the naked eye. Parallax measurements place it at a distance of 211 light years, and it is currently receding with a heliocentric radial velocity of 8 km/s.

HD 208741 has a 10th magnitude K-type main-sequence companion separated by 34.8″. Together, they make up a wide binary system designated collectively as CPD−76°1542. Sir John Herschel, the discoverer of the pair, noted the primary to be a probable spectroscopic binary.

This object has a stellar classification of F3 III, indicating that it is a slightly evolved F-type star. Gaia Data Release 3 models it to be a dwarf that is 81.3% through its main sequence lifetime. At present it has 1.52 times the mass of the Sun and a slightly enlarged radius of 2.6 R_{☉} due to its evolved state. It radiates at 12.9 times the luminosity of the Sun from its photosphere at an effective temperature of 6,937 K. HD 208741 has a metallicity twice the Sun's, making it metal enriched. It is estimated to be 1.1 billion years old, and is spinning with a projected rotational velocity of 36 km/s.
