= Rho Octantis =

High proper motion star in the constellation Octans

ρ Octantis
- Location of ρ Octantis (circled)

Observation data Epoch J2000 Equinox J2000
- Constellation: Octans
- Right ascension: 15^{h} 43^{m} 16.927^{s}
- Declination: −84° 27′ 54.99″
- Apparent magnitude (V): 5.57±0.01

Characteristics
- Spectral type: A1/2 V
- U−B color index: +0.08
- B−V color index: +0.11

Astrometry
Radial velocity (R_{v})	−11±10 km/s
Proper motion (μ)	RA: +131.101 mas/yr Dec.: +96.007 mas/yr
Parallax (π)	15.1565±0.0796 mas
Distance	215 ± 1 ly (66.0 ± 0.3 pc)
Absolute magnitude (M_{V})	+1.47

Details
Mass	1.99 M_{☉}
Radius	2.19±0.07 R_{☉}
Luminosity	21±1 L_{☉}
Surface gravity (log g)	4.06±0.14 cgs
Temperature	8,881±302 K
Rotational velocity (v sin i)	128 km/s
Age	431 Myr

Other designations
- ρ Octantis, 24 G. Octantis, CPD–84 510, HD 13733, HIP 76996, HR 5729, SAO 258731, WDS J15433-8428A

Database references
SIMBAD	data

Rho Octantis, Latinized from ρ Octantis, is a star located in the southern circumpolar constellation Octans. With an apparent magnitude of 5.57, its faintly visible to the naked eye under ideal conditions. The star is located 215 light years away from the Solar System, but is drifting closer with a radial velocity of −11 km/s.

Rho Octantis has a classification of A1/2 V, which states its a star with the traits of an A1 and A2 main-sequence star. It has nearly twice the mass of the Sun, and has a radius of 2.19 solar radii. The star radiates at a luminosity 21 times greater than the Sun from its photosphere at an effective temperature of 8,881 K, which gives it a white hue. Like many A-type stars, Rho Octantis rotates rapidly, with a projected rotational velocity of 128 km/s; it is 431 million years old. Rho Octantis has a common proper motion K0 companion 65.7” away.
