= HD 191220 =

Star in the constellation Octans

Observation data Epoch J2000.0 Equinox J2000.0 (ICRS)
- Constellation: Octans
- Right ascension: 20^{h} 24^{m} 54.91771^{s}
- Declination: −83° 18′ 38.2301″
- Apparent magnitude (V): 6.14±0.01

Characteristics
- Evolutionary stage: main sequence
- Spectral type: A2/3 mA8-F0
- U−B color index: +0.13
- B−V color index: +0.20

Astrometry
Radial velocity (R_{v})	0.1±1.3 km/s
Proper motion (μ)	RA: +23.223 mas/yr Dec.: +6.228 mas/yr
Parallax (π)	13.331±0.0247 mas
Distance	244.7 ± 0.5 ly (75.0 ± 0.1 pc)
Absolute magnitude (M_{V})	+1.76

Details
Mass	2.06±0.40 M_{☉}
Radius	2.17±0.06 R_{☉}
Luminosity	15.57 L_{☉}
Surface gravity (log g)	4.12±0.06 cgs
Temperature	7,706±126 K
Metallicity [Fe/H]	−0.02 dex
Age	979±166 Myr

Other designations
- 45 G. Octantis, CD−83°253, CPD−83°695, GC 28176, HD 191220, HIP 100697, HR 7698, SAO 258856

Database references
SIMBAD	data

HD 191220, also known as HR 7698, is a solitary white hued star located in the southern circumpolar constellation Octans. It has an apparent magnitude of 6.14, placing it near the limit for naked eye visibility. The object is located relatively close at a distance of 245 light years based on Gaia DR3 parallax measurements but is slowly receding with a heliocentric radial velocity of 0.1 km/s. At its current distance, HD 191220's brightness is diminished by 0.22 magnitudes due to interstellar dust.

This is a chemically peculiar Am star with a stellar classification of A2/3mA8-F0, an A-type star with the metallic lines of a star with a class of A8-F0. It has double the mass of the Sun and 2.2 times its girth. It radiates 15.57 times the luminosity of the Sun from its photosphere at an effective temperature of 7,706 K. HD 191220 is estimated to be nearly a billion years old and has a near solar metallicity — what astronomers dub a star's abundance of chemical elements heavier than helium.
