= Theta Octantis =

Star in the constellation Octans

- Location of θ Octantis (circled)

Observation data Epoch J2000 Equinox ICRS
- Constellation: Octans
- Right ascension: 00^{h} 01^{m} 35.70158^{s}
- Declination: −77° 03′ 56.6092″
- Apparent magnitude (V): 4.78

Characteristics
- Evolutionary stage: red clump
- Spectral type: K3III
- U−B color index: +1.41
- B−V color index: +1.27

Astrometry
Radial velocity (R_{v})	+22.48±0.17 km/s
Proper motion (μ)	RA: −57.30 mas/yr Dec.: −177.06 mas/yr
Parallax (π)	15.02±0.18 mas
Distance	217 ± 3 ly (66.6 ± 0.8 pc)
Absolute magnitude (M_{V})	0.66

Details
Mass	1.20 M_{☉}
Radius	15.84+0.42 −1.02 R_{☉}
Luminosity	79.2±1.5 L_{☉}
Surface gravity (log g)	2.16 cgs
Temperature	4,325+147 −55 K
Rotational velocity (v sin i)	< 1.0 km/s

Other designations
- θ Oct, CPD−77°1596, FK5 904, GC 33321, HD 224889, HIP 122, HR 9084, SAO 258207

Database references
SIMBAD	data

θ Octantis, Latinized as Theta Octantis, is a single star in the southern circumpolar constellation of Octans, near the constellation border with Hydrus. It is visible to the naked eye as a faint, orange-hued star with an apparent visual magnitude of 4.78. The star is located approximately 217 light years from the Sun based on parallax, and is drifting further away with a radial velocity of +22.5 km/s.

This is an aging giant star with a stellar classification of K3III, having exhausted the supply of hydrogen at its core then cooled and expanded. It has been catalogued as a red clump giant, which would indicate it is on the horizontal branch and is undergoing core helium fusion. At present it has 16 times the radius of the Sun. This star has 1.20 times the mass of the Sun and is radiating 79 times the Sun's luminosity from its enlarged photosphere at an effective temperature of 4,325 K.
