= HD 213402 =

K-type giant in the constellation Octans

- Location of HD 213402 on the map (circled)

Observation data Epoch J2000.0 Equinox ICRS
- Constellation: Octans
- Right ascension: 22^{h} 35^{m} 26.52327^{s}
- Declination: −78° 46′ 17.7049″
- Apparent magnitude (V): 6.14±0.01

Characteristics
- Evolutionary stage: red giant branch
- Spectral type: K1 III
- U−B color index: +1.35
- B−V color index: +1.38

Astrometry
Radial velocity (R_{v})	−12.8±0.4 km/s
Proper motion (μ)	RA: +53.718 mas/yr Dec.: −7.451 mas/yr
Parallax (π)	3.5469±0.0256 mas
Distance	920 ± 7 ly (282 ± 2 pc)
Absolute magnitude (M_{V})	−1.15

Details
Mass	1.17 M_{☉}
Radius	44.5±2.3 R_{☉}
Luminosity	471±8 L_{☉}
Surface gravity (log g)	1.16 cgs
Temperature	4,481±122 K
Metallicity [Fe/H]	−0.07 dex
Rotational velocity (v sin i)	<1.0 km/s

Other designations
- 73 G. Octantis, CPD−79°1206, FK5 3807, GC 31498, HD 213402, HIP 111504, HR 8577, SAO 258049, TIC 273651959

Database references
SIMBAD	data

HD 213402 (HR 8577; 73 G. Octantis) is a solitary star located in the southern circumpolar constellation Octans. It has an apparent magnitude of 6.14, placing it near the limit for naked eye visibility. The object is located relatively far at a distance of 920 light-years based on Gaia DR3 parallax measurements, but it is drifting closer with a heliocentric radial velocity of −12.8 km/s. At its current distance, HD 213402's brightness is diminished by 0.45 magnitudes due to interstellar extinction and it has an absolute magnitude of −1.15.

HD 213402 has a stellar classification of K1 III, indicating that it is an evolved K-type giant. It has a comparable mass to the Sun but it has expanded to 44.5 times the radius of the Sun. It radiates 471 times the luminosity of the Sun from its enlarged photosphere at an effective temperature of 4,481 K, giving it the typical orange hue of a K-type star. Gaia DR3 stellar evolution models place it on the red giant branch and yield a larger radius of 50.9 R_{☉} and a higher luminosity of 825 L_{☉}. HD 213402 is slightly metal deficient with an iron abundance of [Fe/H] = −0.07 or 85% of the Sun's abundance. Like many giant stars it rotates slowly, but its projected rotational velocity is too low to be measured accurately.
