= HD 167714 =

Star in the constellation of Octans

Observation data Epoch J2000.0 Equinox ICRS
- Constellation: Octans
- Right ascension: 18^{h} 29^{m} 19.94396^{s}
- Declination: −80° 13′ 57.7452″
- Apparent magnitude (V): 5.95±0.01

Characteristics
- Evolutionary stage: red giant branch
- Spectral type: K2 III
- U−B color index: +1.27
- B−V color index: +1.16

Astrometry
Radial velocity (R_{v})	−13.9±0.4 km/s
Proper motion (μ)	RA: −22.298 mas/yr Dec.: −63.166 mas/yr
Parallax (π)	9.0795±0.026 mas
Distance	359 ± 1 ly (110.1 ± 0.3 pc)
Absolute magnitude (M_{V})	+0.57

Details
Mass	1.39^{+0.40}_{−1.10} M_{☉}
Radius	12.28 R_{☉}
Luminosity	64.6^{+3.0}_{−2.9} L_{☉}
Surface gravity (log g)	2.55 cgs
Temperature	4,692±122 K
Metallicity [Fe/H]	+0.11 dex
Rotational velocity (v sin i)	1.7±1.2 km/s
Age	1.99^{+0.843}_{−0.453} Gyr

Other designations
- 32 G. Octantis, CPD−80°849, GC 25089, HD 167714, HIP 90606, HR 6837, SAO 258796

Database references
SIMBAD	data

HD 167714, also known as HR 6837, is a solitary, orange hued star located in the southern circumpolar constellation Octans. It has apparent magnitude of 5.95, allowing it to be faintly visible to the naked eye. Based on parallax measurements from Gaia, the object is estimated to be 359 light years distant. With a heliocentric radial velocity of −13.9 km/s, it is approaching the Solar System.

This is an evolved red giant with a stellar classification of K2 III. It appears to be on the red giant branch, generating energy by fusing a hydrogen shell around an inert helium core. At present it has 1.4 times the mass of the Sun and at the age of two billion years, it has expanded to 12.3 times its girth. It shines with a luminosity 65 times greater than that of the Sun from its enlarged photosphere at an effective temperature of 4,692 K. HD 167714 has a near-solar metallicity and is spinning slowly with a projected rotational velocity of 1.7 km/s.
