= Chi Octantis =

Star in the constellation Octans

χ Octantis
- Location of χ Oct (circled)

Observation data Epoch J2000.0 Equinox ICRS
- Constellation: Octans
- Right ascension: 18^{h} 54^{m} 47.14062^{s}
- Declination: −87° 36′ 21.0359″
- Apparent magnitude (V): 5.28±0.01

Characteristics
- Spectral type: K3 III
- U−B color index: +1.60
- B−V color index: +1.28

Astrometry
Radial velocity (R_{v})	33.6±3.1 km/s
Proper motion (μ)	RA: −36.555 mas/yr Dec.: −135.715 mas/yr
Parallax (π)	12.5114±0.0730 mas
Distance	261 ± 2 ly (79.9 ± 0.5 pc)
Absolute magnitude (M_{V})	+0.81

Details
Mass	1.25±0.33 M_{☉}
Radius	15.6±0.8 R_{☉}
Luminosity	73.6±0.7 L_{☉}
Surface gravity (log g)	2.19 cgs
Temperature	4,266^{+99}_{−97} K
Metallicity [Fe/H]	+0.10 dex
Rotational velocity (v sin i)	<1 km/s

Other designations
- χ Oct, 30 G. Octantis, CD−87°92, CPD−87°274, FK5 922, GC 25207, HD 164461, HIP 92824, HR 6721, SAO 258799

Database references
SIMBAD	data

Chi Octantis, Latinized from χ Octantis, is a solitary star located in the southern circumpolar constellation Octans. It is faintly visible to the naked eye as an orange-hued star with an apparent magnitude of 5.28. The object is located relatively close at a distance of 261 light years based on Gaia EDR3 parallax measurements, but it is receding with a heliocentric radial velocity 33.6 km/s. At its current distance, Chi Octantis' brightness is diminished by 0.24 magnitudes due to interstellar dust. It has an absolute magnitude of +0.81.

Chi Octantis is an evolved red giant with a stellar classification of K3 III. It has 125% the mass of the Sun and an enlarged radius of 14.45 R_{☉} due to its evolved state. It radiates 73.6 times the luminosity of the Sun from its photosphere at an effective temperature of 4,266 K. Chi Octantis is metal enriched with an iron abundance 126% that of the Sun ([Fe/H] = +0.10) and spins slowly with a projected rotational velocity less than 1 km/s^{−1}.
