= R Octantis =

Variable star in the constellation Octans

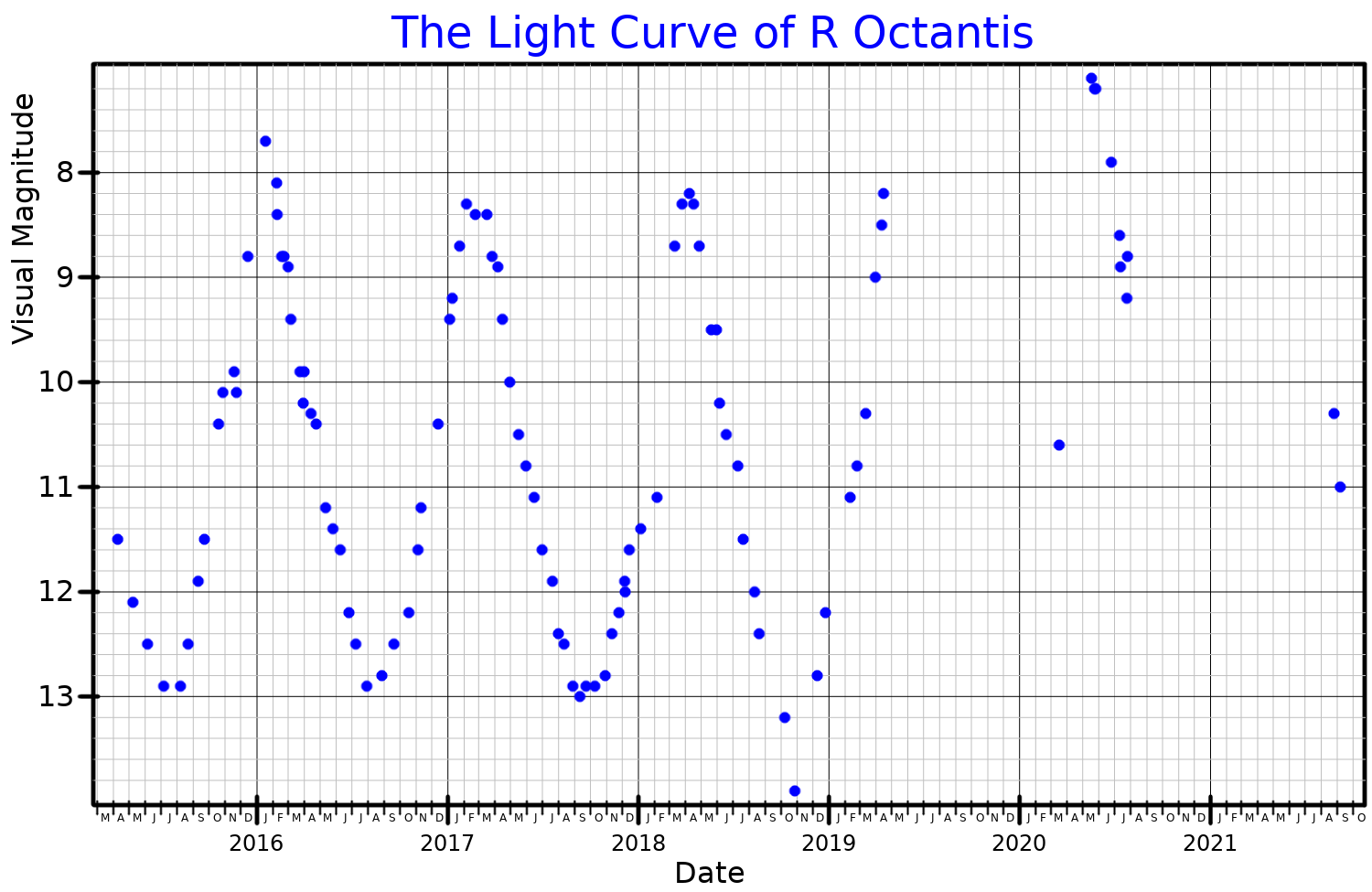
- The visual band light curve of R Octantis, from AAVSO data

Observation data Epoch J2000.0 Equinox J2000.0 (ICRS)
- Constellation: Octans
- Right ascension: 05^{h} 26^{m} 06.19562^{s}
- Declination: −86° 23′ 17.7741″
- Apparent magnitude (V): 6.4 – 13.2

Characteristics
- Spectral type: M5.5e (M5.3e – M8.4e)
- Variable type: Mira

Astrometry
Radial velocity (R_{v})	46±5 km/s
Proper motion (μ)	RA: 0.540 mas/yr Dec.: 31.079 mas/yr
Parallax (π)	1.7152±0.0862 mas
Distance	1,900 ± 100 ly (580 ± 30 pc)

Details
Mass	6.6 M_{☉}
Radius	466 R_{☉}
Luminosity	9,304 L_{☉}
Temperature	2,571 K

Other designations
- R Octantis, CD−86°52, CPD−86°72, HD 40857, HIP 25412

Database references
SIMBAD	data

R Octantis, also known as HD 40857, is a solitary, red hued variable star located in the southern circumpolar constellation Octans. It has an apparent magnitude that varies in-between 6.4 and 13.2 within 405 days. At is maximum, it is barely visible to the naked eye. The object is located relatively far at a distance of about 1,900 light years based on parallax measurements from Gaia DR3, but is receding with a heliocentric radial velocity of 46 km/s.

R Octantis has been known to have a peculiar spectra since 1892. It was revealed to have emission lines in its spectrum in a 1954 paper and was found to be a long period variable a year later. In 1966, R Octantis was officially classified as a Mira variable. Later observations reveal it to have an overabundance of oxygen on its outer layers.

The object has an average stellar classification of M5.5e, indicating that it is a M-type star with emission lines in its spectrum. However, this can range from M5.3 to M8.4e. It is currently on the asymptotic giant branch, generating energy by fusing hydrogen and helium shells around an inert carbon core. As a result, it has expanded to 466 times the radius of the Sun. R Octantis radiates over 9,000 times the luminosity of the Sun from its photosphere at an effective temperature of 2,571 K, which is cooler than most Mira variables.
