= Mu1 Octantis =

Star in the constellation of Octans

μ^{1} Octantis
- Location of μ^{1} Octantis (circled in red)

Observation data Epoch J2000.0 Equinox ICRS
- Constellation: Octans
- Right ascension: 20^{h} 42^{m} 02.9873^{s}
- Declination: −76° 10′ 50.131″
- Apparent magnitude (V): 5.98 ± 0.01

Characteristics
- Spectral type: F6 II/III
- U−B color index: +0.11
- B−V color index: +0.44

Astrometry
Radial velocity (R_{v})	−36 ± 4 km/s
Proper motion (μ)	RA: +190.891 mas/yr Dec.: −9.479 mas/yr
Parallax (π)	9.7399±0.0241 mas
Distance	334.9 ± 0.8 ly (102.7 ± 0.3 pc)
Absolute magnitude (M_{V})	+0.97

Details
Mass	1.36+0.26 −0.19 M_{☉}
Radius	4.68+0.15 −0.32 R_{☉}
Luminosity	34.3 L_{☉}
Surface gravity (log g)	3.23+0.11 −0.07 cgs
Temperature	6,521 K
Metallicity [Fe/H]	+0.19 dex
Age	900 Myr

Other designations
- μ^{1} Oct, 50 G. Octantis, CD−76°1054, CPD−76°1434, GC 28731, HD 196051, HIP 102162, HR 7863, SAO 257838, LTT 8161

Database references
SIMBAD	data

Mu^{1} Octantis, Latinized from μ^{1} Octantis, is a solitary star in the southern circumpolar constellation Octans. It has an apparent magnitude of 5.98, allowing it to be faintly visible to the naked eye under ideal conditions. Located 335 light years away, it is approaching the Sun with a heliocentric radial velocity of −36 km/s.

This object is an F-type star with the blended luminosity class of a giant star and a bright giant. At present it has 1.36 times the mass of the Sun but has expanded to 4.68 times its girth. It radiates at 34.3 L_{☉} from its enlarged photosphere at an effective temperature of 6,521 K, giving it a yellow white glow. Mu^{1} Octantis is metal enriched and has an age of 900 million years.
