= Pi1 Octantis =

Star in the constellation of Octans

π^{1} Octantis
Observation data Epoch J2000.0 Equinox J2000.0 (ICRS)
- Constellation: Octans
- Right ascension: 15^{h} 01^{m} 50.7983^{s}
- Declination: −83° 13′ 39.530″
- Apparent magnitude (V): 5.64±0.01

Characteristics
- Spectral type: G8/K0 III
- U−B color index: +0.74
- B−V color index: +0.95

Astrometry
Radial velocity (R_{v})	13.6±0.4 km/s
Proper motion (μ)	RA: +18.954 mas/yr Dec.: +52.520 mas/yr
Parallax (π)	8.419±0.0349 mas
Distance	387 ± 2 ly (118.8 ± 0.5 pc)
Absolute magnitude (M_{V})	+0.24

Details
Mass	2.74±0.15 M_{☉}
Radius	11.62±0.21 R_{☉}
Luminosity	76.2±1.7 L_{☉}
Surface gravity (log g)	2.7±0.1 cgs
Temperature	5,002±36 K
Metallicity [Fe/H]	−0.01±0.03 dex
Rotational velocity (v sin i)	<1 km/s

Other designations
- π^{1} Oct, 21 G. Octantis, CPD−82°629, FK5 3987, GC 20070, HD 130650, HIP 73540, HR 5525, SAO 258713

Database references
SIMBAD	data

Pi^{1} Octantis (Pi^{1} Oct), Latinized π^{1} Octantis, is a solitary star in the southern circumpolar constellation Octans. It is faintly visible to the naked eye with an apparent magnitude 5.64, and is estimated to be 387 light years away. However, it is receding with a heliocentric radial velocity of 14 km/s.

Pi^{1} Oct has a stellar classification of G8/K0 III — intermediate between a G8 and K0 giant star. It has 2.74 times the mass of the Sun and an effective temperature of 5,002 k, giving a yellow hue. However, an enlarged radius of 11.62 R_{☉} yields a luminosity 76 times that of the Sun. Pi^{1} Oct has a metallicity around solar level and spins with a projected rotational velocity lower than 1 km/s.
