= Tau Octantis =

Star in the southern constellation of Octans

τ Octantis
- Location of τ Octantis (circled)

Observation data Epoch J2000.0 Equinox ICRS
- Constellation: Octans
- Right ascension: 23^{h} 28^{m} 03.7855^{s}
- Declination: −87° 28′ 55.967″
- Apparent magnitude (V): 5.50

Characteristics
- Spectral type: K2 III
- U−B color index: +1.43
- B−V color index: +1.27

Astrometry
Radial velocity (R_{v})	31.0±1.4 km/s
Proper motion (μ)	RA: +16.782 mas/yr Dec.: +11.957 mas/yr
Parallax (π)	6.8009±0.0574 mas
Distance	480 ± 4 ly (147 ± 1 pc)
Absolute magnitude (M_{V})	−0.36

Details
Mass	1.14 M_{☉}
Radius	24 R_{☉}
Luminosity	223 L_{☉}
Surface gravity (log g)	1.63 cgs
Temperature	4,422 K
Metallicity [Fe/H]	+0.12 dex
Rotational velocity (v sin i)	<1 km/s

Other designations
- τ Oct, 81 G. Octantis, CPD−88°204, FK5 925, GC 32558, HD 219765, HIP 115836, HR 8862, SAO 258970

Database references
SIMBAD	data

Tau Octantis, Latinized from τ Octantis, is a solitary star in the southern circumpolar constellation Octans. It has an apparent magnitude of 5.50, allowing it to be faintly seen with the naked eye. The object is located at a distance of 480 light years but is receding with a heliocentric radial velocity of 31 km/s.

Tau Octantis has a stellar classification of K2 III, indicating that the object is a red giant. It has 114% the mass of the Sun but is 223 times as luminous. However, an enlarged radius of 24 R_{☉} yields an effective temperature of 4,422 K, giving it an orange glow. Tau Octantis has an iron abundance 132% that of the Sun and is believed to be a member of the old disk population. Currently, it spins with a projected rotational velocity less than 1 km/s.
