= Upsilon Octantis =

Star in the constellation of Octans

υ Octantis
- Location of υ Octantis (circled)

Observation data Epoch J2000.0 Equinox ICRS
- Constellation: Octans
- Right ascension: 22^{h} 31^{m} 37.5152^{s}
- Declination: −85° 58′ 02.110″
- Apparent magnitude (V): 5.75±0.01

Characteristics
- Spectral type: K0 III
- U−B color index: +0.88
- B−V color index: +1.02

Astrometry
Radial velocity (R_{v})	19±7.8 km/s
Proper motion (μ)	RA: −37.556 mas/yr Dec.: +61.431 mas/yr
Parallax (π)	9.5042±0.0351 mas
Distance	343 ± 1 ly (105.2 ± 0.4 pc)
Absolute magnitude (M_{V})	+0.77

Details
Mass	2.12±0.07 M_{☉}
Radius	10.3±0.2 R_{☉}
Luminosity	56±1.1 L_{☉}
Surface gravity (log g)	2.7±0.1 cgs
Temperature	4,910±42 K
Metallicity [Fe/H]	0.00±0.03 dex
Rotational velocity (v sin i)	1.5±1.3 km/s

Other designations
- υ Oct, 71 G. Octantis, CPD−86°406, FK5 1670, GC 31327, HD 211539, HIP 111196, HR 8505, SAO 258932

Database references
SIMBAD	data

Upsilon Octantis (Upsilon Oct), Latinized from υ Octantis, is a solitary star in the southern circumpolar constellation Octans. It is faintly visible to the naked eye with an apparent magnitude of 5.75 and is located 343 light years away from the Solar System. However, it is receding with a heliocentric radial velocity of 19 km/s.

Upsilon Oct has a stellar classification of K0 III, indicating that it is a red giant. At present it has 2.12 times the mass of the Sun but has expanded to 10.3 times its girth. It shines with a luminosity of 56 L_{☉} from its enlarged photosphere at an effective temperature of 4,910 K, giving a yellowish orange hue when viewed at night. Upsilon Oct has a solar metallicity, with an iron abundance equivalent to the Sun's. It spins leisurely with a poorly-constrained projected rotational velocity of 1.5 km/s.
