= Pi2 Octantis =

Star in the constellation Octans

π^{2} Octantis
- Location of π^{2} Octantis (circled)

Observation data Epoch J2000.0 Equinox J2000.0 (ICRS)
- Constellation: Octans
- Right ascension: 15^{h} 04^{m} 46.9232^{s}
- Declination: −83° 02′ 17.920″
- Apparent magnitude (V): 5.64 ± 0.01

Characteristics
- Spectral type: G8 Ib
- U−B color index: +1.15
- B−V color index: +1.3

Astrometry
Radial velocity (R_{v})	−13.8 ± 0.3 km/s
Proper motion (μ)	RA: −8.312 mas/yr Dec.: −17.597 mas/yr
Parallax (π)	2.0741±0.0429 mas
Distance	1,570 ± 30 ly (482 ± 10 pc)
Absolute magnitude (M_{V})	−3.19

Details
Mass	7 ± 1 M_{☉}
Radius	69.02+1.61 −1.53 R_{☉}
Luminosity	2,709 L_{☉}
Temperature	4,588 K
Rotational velocity (v sin i)	5.7 ± 1.8 km/s
Age	43 ± 3 Myr

Other designations
- π^{2} Oct, 22 G. Octantis, CPD−82°636, GC 20145, HD 131246, HIP 73771, HR 5545, SAO 258714

Database references
SIMBAD	data

Pi^{2} Octantis, Latinized from π^{2} Octantis, is a solitary star situated in the southern circumpolar constellation Octans. It has an apparent magnitude of 5.64, allowing it to be faintly visible to the naked eye under ideal conditions. Located 1,570 light years away, the star is approaching the Sun with a heliocentric radial velocity of −13.8 km/s.

This object is an ageing late G-type supergiant that has 7 times the mass of the Sun and 69.02 times the radius of the Sun. It radiates at 2,709 L_{☉} from its enlarged photosphere at an effective temperature of 4,588 K, giving it an orange-yellow glow. Despite its advanced state, Pi^{2} Octantis is still a young star at an age of 43 million years. It spins modestly with a projected rotational velocity of 5.7 km/s.
