= Mu2 Octantis =

Binary star system in the constellation Octans

Mu^{2} Octantis
- Location of μ^{2} Octantis (circled in red)

Observation data Epoch J2000.0 Equinox ICRS
- Constellation: Octans
- μ^{2} Oct A
- Right ascension: 20^{h} 41^{m} 44.1016^{s}
- Declination: −75° 21′ 02.883″
- Apparent magnitude (V): +6.481±0.007
- μ^{2} Oct B
- Right ascension: 20^{h} 41^{m} 45.5181^{s}
- Declination: −75° 20′ 47.047″
- Apparent magnitude (V): +7.153±0.011

Characteristics

μ^{2} Oct A
- Spectral type: G1V
- U−B color index: +0.26
- B−V color index: +0.62

μ^{2} Oct B
- Spectral type: G1V

Astrometry

μ^{2} Oct A
Radial velocity (R_{v})	−11.00±0.12 km/s
Proper motion (μ)	RA: 156.404 mas/yr Dec.: −162.214 mas/yr
Parallax (π)	25.0327±0.0205 mas
Distance	130.3 ± 0.1 ly (39.95 ± 0.03 pc)
Absolute magnitude (M_{V})	3.28

μ^{2} Oct B
Radial velocity (R_{v})	−10.94±0.15 km/s
Proper motion (μ)	RA: +163.531 mas/yr Dec.: −171.346 mas/yr
Parallax (π)	25.0379±0.0167 mas
Distance	130.27 ± 0.09 ly (39.94 ± 0.03 pc)

Orbit
Semi-major axis (a)	932 AU

Details

μ^{2} Oct A
Mass	1.330±0.013 M_{☉}
Radius	1.730+0.044 −0.039 R_{☉}
Luminosity	3.54+0.27 −0.20 L_{☉}
Surface gravity (log g)	4.09±0.02 cgs
Temperature	6,059±52 K
Metallicity [Fe/H]	+0.216±0.009 dex
Rotation	22.5±2.9 days
Rotational velocity (v sin i)	1.45 km/s
Age	3.50+0.65 −0.27 Gyr

μ^{2} Oct B
Mass	1.190+0.017 −0.018 M_{☉}
Radius	1.190+0.034 −0.010 R_{☉}
Temperature	6,020±52 K
Metallicity [Fe/H]	+0.267±0.009 dex
Age	2.10+1.03 −0.34 Gyr

Other designations
- μ^{2} Oct, CCDM J20417-7521
- μ^{2} Oct A: CD−75°1173, HD 196067, HIP 102125, HR 7864, SAO 257836, 2MASS J20414409-7521029
- μ^{2} Oct B: CD−75°1174, HD 196068, HIP 102128, SAO 257837, 2MASS J20414550-7520471

Database references
SIMBAD	A
- B
Exoplanet Archive	data

Mu^{2} Octantis (μ^{2} Oct) is a binary star system in the constellation Octans, whose primary and secondary stars have apparent magnitudes of +6.481 and 7.153, respectively. Based on parallax measurements, it lies 130.3 light-years away.

The two stars, HD 196067 and HD 196068 (also named μ^{2} Oct A and μ^{2} Oct B), are separated at 17 arcseconds in the sky, corresponding to 740 astronomical units (AU). The semimajor axis of the stars' orbit is 932 AU.

Component A is a G-dwarf star with 1.33 and 1.73 times of the Sun's mass and radius, respectively. Component B also a G-type main-sequence star with a radius 1.19 times larger than the Sun. Their effective temperatures are similar. HD 196068 has a higher metallicity than its companion, the reasons for this are uncertain.

== Planetary system ==
From 1998 to 2012, the system was observed using the CORALIE instrument, at the ESO's La Silla Observatory.

In November 2012, a long-period, wide-orbiting planet was deduced by radial velocity around HD 196067. The planet has been pulled to an eccentric orbit by the B star HD 196068. The planet's true mass, as measured by astrometry, is 12.5 M_{J}, placing it right on the traditionally adopted boundary between planets and brown dwarfs.

A second, innermost planet was detected using radial velocity observations with the CORALIE, HARPS, and ESPRESSO observatories. Despite its small orbit, it does not transit the host star.

The μ^{2} Oct A planetary system
Companion (in order from star)	Mass	Semimajor axis (AU)	Orbital period (days)	Eccentricity	Inclination (°)	Radius
c	≥10.4±1.39 M_{🜨}	—	4.601088±0.000192	0.235±0.118	—	—
b	11.4±1.6 M_{J}	4.71+0.11 −0.10	3,413.7±10.5	0.56292±0.00703	29.7+5.0 −3.8	—
