= Octans =

Constellation in the southern celestial hemisphere, containing the south celestial pole

- Constellation
- List of stars in Octans
- Abbreviation: Oct
- Genitive: Octantis
- Pronunciation: /ˈɒktænz/, genitive /ɒkˈtæntɪs/
- Symbolism: the Octant
- Right ascension: 00^{h} –24^{h}
- Declination: −74.30°–−90°
- Quadrant: SQ4
- Area: 291 sq. deg. (50th)
- Main stars: 3
- Bayer/Flamsteed stars: 27
- Stars brighter than 3.00^{m}: 0
- Stars within 10.00 pc (32.62 ly): 1
- Brightest star: ν Oct (3.73^{m})
- Nearest star: Gliese 877
- Messier objects: 0
- Meteor showers: 0
- Bordering constellations: Tucana; Indus; Pavo; Apus; Chamaeleon; Mensa; Hydrus
- Visible at latitudes between +0° and −90°. Best visible at 21:00 (9 p.m.) during the month of October. Circumpolar

Octans is a faint constellation located in the deep Southern Sky. Its name is Latin for the eighth part of a circle, but it is named after the octant, a navigational instrument. Devised by French astronomer Nicolas Louis de Lacaille in 1752, Octans remains one of the 88 modern constellations. The southern celestial pole is located within the boundaries of Octans.

== History and mythology ==
Octans was one of 14 constellations created by French astronomer Nicolas Louis de Lacaille during his expedition to the Cape of Good Hope, and was originally named l’Octans de Reflexion (“the reflecting octant”) in 1752, after he had observed and catalogued almost 10,000 southern stars during a two-year stay at the Cape of Good Hope. He devised fourteen new constellations in uncharted regions of the Southern Celestial Hemisphere not visible from Europe. All but one honoured instruments that symbolised the Age of Enlightenment. (Note: The exception is Mensa, named for the Table Mountain. The other thirteen (alongside Octans) are Antlia, Caelum, Circinus, Fornax, Horologium, Microscopium, Norma, Pictor, Pyxis, Reticulum, Sculptor and Telescopium.)

It was part of his catalogue of the southern sky, the Coelum Australe Stelliferum, which was published posthumously in 1763. In Europe, it became more widely known as Octans Hadleianus, in honor of English mathematician John Hadley, who invented the octant in 1730. There is no real mythology related to Octans, partially due to its faintness and relative recentness, but mostly because of its extreme southerly latitude.

== Features ==
=== Stars ===
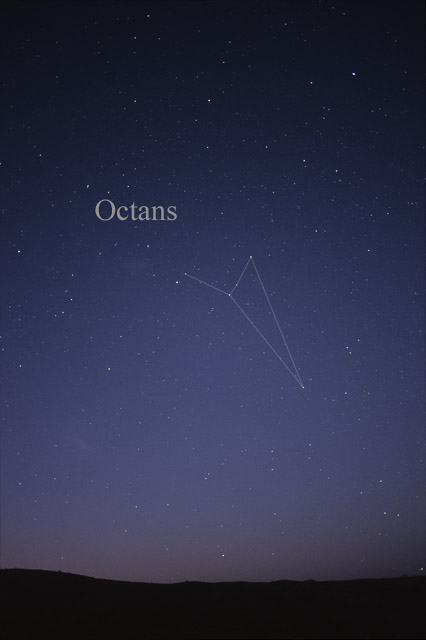
The constellation Octans as it can be seen by the naked eye.

Lacaille gave 22 stars Bayer designations Alpha through Upsilon in 1756, but omitted Omicron and Xi, and labelled three stars as Gamma and two stars as Mu and Pi. In 1879, Benjamin Gould added Xi, Phi, Chi, Psi, and Omega, as they were bright enough and their closeness to the south celestial pole warranted their names. Charles Rumker added Omicron Octantis, which was noted to be the southern pole star at the time, but this is now generally unused in some atlases.

Octans is a generally inconspicuous constellation with only one star brighter than magnitude 4.

This constellation is unusual on that its brightest member has a very late Bayer designation: Nu Octantis. A spectral class K1 IV subgiant with an apparent magnitude 3.73, it has a white dwarf companion and is orbited by one exoplanet.

Beta Octantis is the second brightest star in the constellation.

Polaris Australis (Sigma Octantis), the southern pole star, is a magnitude 5.4 star just over 1 degree away from the true south celestial pole. Its relative faintness means that it is not practical for navigation.

BQ Octantis is a fainter, magnitude 6.82 star located much closer to the South Pole (at less than a degree) than Sigma.

In addition to having the current southern pole star of Earth, Octans also contains the southern pole star of the planet Saturn, which is the magnitude 4.3 Delta Octantis.

The Astronomical Society of Southern Africa in 2003 reported that observations of the Mira variable stars R and T Octantis were urgently needed.

At least four star systems are known to have planets. Mu^{2} Octantis is a binary star system, the brighter component of which has a planet. Nu Octantis A also has a planet orbiting. HD 142022 is a binary system, a component of which is a sunlike star with a massive planet with an orbital period of 1928 ± 46 days. HD 212301 is a yellow-white main sequence star with a hot jupiter that completes an orbit every 2.2 days.

=== Deep-sky objects ===
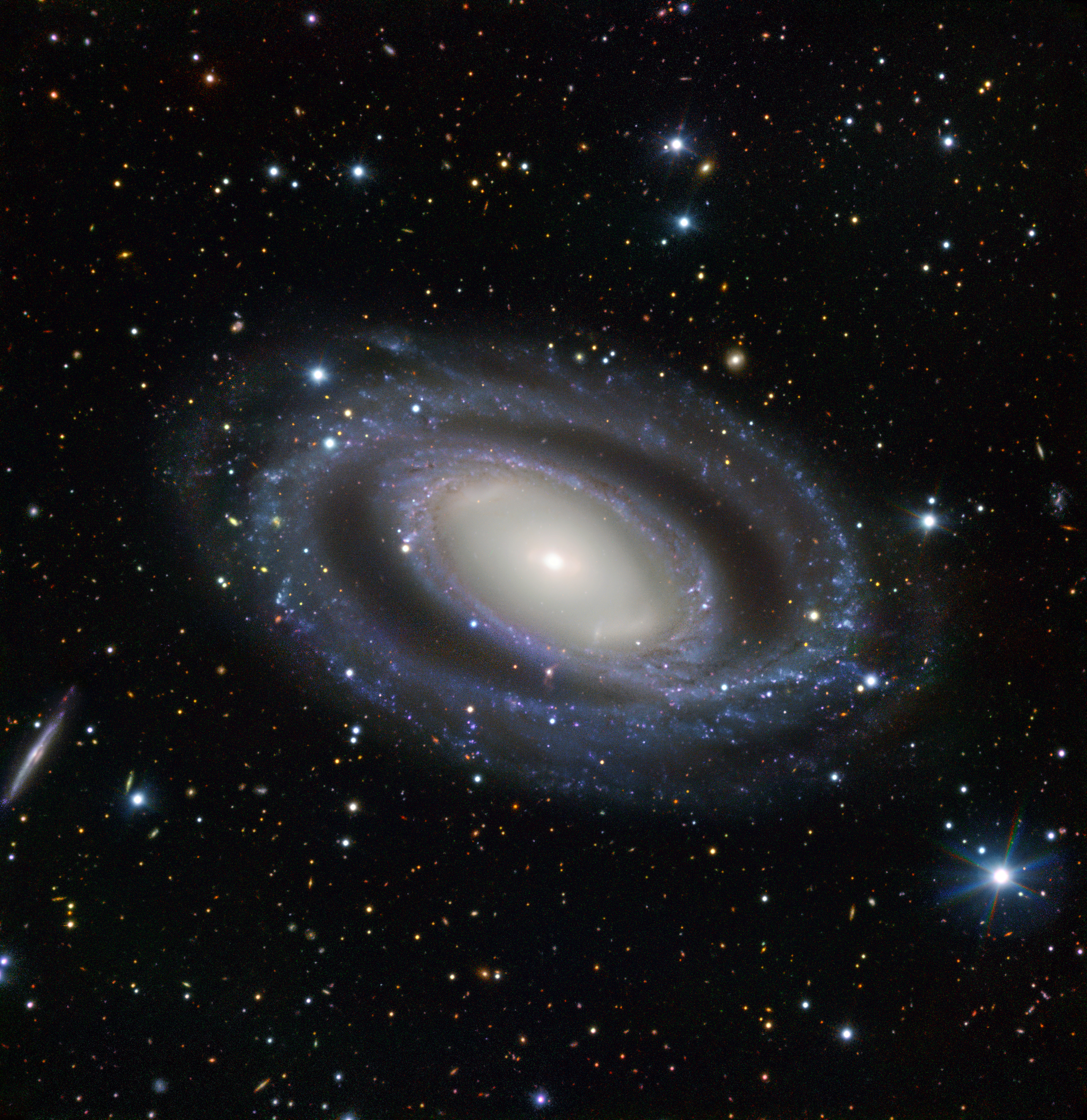
NGC 7098

NGC 2573 (also known as Polarissima Australis) is a faint barred spiral galaxy that happens to be the closest NGC object to the south celestial pole. NGC 7095 and NGC 7098 are two barred spiral galaxies that are 115 million and 95 million light-years distant from Earth respectively. The sparse open cluster Collinder 411 is also located in the constellation.

== Namesakes ==
USS Octans (AF-26) was a stores ship used by the United States Navy during World War II.

== See also ==
- Octans (Chinese astronomy)
