= Pyxis in Chinese astronomy =

According to traditional Chinese uranography, the modern constellation Pyxis is located within the southern quadrant of the sky, which is symbolized as the Vermilion Bird of the South (南方朱雀, Nán Fāng Zhū Què).

The name of the western constellation in modern Chinese is 羅盤座 (luó pán zuò), meaning "the compass constellation".

== Stars ==
The map of Chinese constellation in constellation Pyxis area consists of:

Four Symbols	Mansion (Chinese name)	Romanization	Translation	Asterisms (Chinese name)	Romanization	Translation	Western star name	Chinese star name	Romanization	Translation
Vermilion Bird of the South (南方朱雀)	鬼	Guǐ	Ghost	天狗	Tiāngǒu	Celestial Dog				
Vermilion Bird of the South (南方朱雀)	鬼	Guǐ	Ghost	天狗	Tiāngǒu	Celestial Dog	β Pyx	天狗四	Tiāngǒusì	4th star
Vermilion Bird of the South (南方朱雀)	鬼	Guǐ	Ghost	天狗	Tiāngǒu	Celestial Dog	α Pyx	天狗五	Tiāngǒuwu	5th star
Vermilion Bird of the South (南方朱雀)	鬼	Guǐ	Ghost	天狗	Tiāngǒu	Celestial Dog	γ Pyx	天狗六	Tiāngǒuliù	6th star
Vermilion Bird of the South (南方朱雀)	鬼	Guǐ	Ghost	天狗	Tiāngǒu	Celestial Dog	δ Pyx	天狗七	Tiāngǒuqī	7th star
Vermilion Bird of the South (南方朱雀)	張	Zhāng	Extended Net	天廟	Tiānmiào	Celestial Temple	θ Pyx	天廟一	Tiānmiàoyī	1st star

== See also ==
- Chinese astronomy
- Traditional Chinese star names
- Chinese constellations
