= Vela in Chinese astronomy =

The modern constellation Vela lies across one of the quadrants symbolized by The Vermilion Bird of the South (南方朱雀, Nán Fāng Zhū Què) and The Southern Asterisms (近南極星區, Jìnnánjíxīngōu), that divide the sky in traditional Chinese uranography.

The name of the western constellation in modern Chinese is 船帆座 (chuán fān zuò), meaning "the sail constellation".

== Stars ==
The map of Chinese constellation in constellation Vela area consists of :

Four Symbols	Mansion (Chinese name)	Romanization	Translation	Asterisms (Chinese name)	Romanization	Translation	Western star name	Proper Name	Chinese star name	Romanization	Translation
The Vermilion Bird of the South (南方朱雀)	鬼	Guǐ	Ghost	天狗	Tiāngǒu	Celestial Dog					
The Vermilion Bird of the South (南方朱雀)	鬼	Guǐ	Ghost	天狗	Tiāngǒu	Celestial Dog	e Vel		天狗一	Tiāngǒuyī	1st star
The Vermilion Bird of the South (南方朱雀)	鬼	Guǐ	Ghost	天狗	Tiāngǒu	Celestial Dog	d Vel		天狗二	Tiāngǒuèr	2nd star
The Vermilion Bird of the South (南方朱雀)	鬼	Guǐ	Ghost	天狗	Tiāngǒu	Celestial Dog	HD 75630		天狗三	Tiāngǒusān	3rd star
The Vermilion Bird of the South (南方朱雀)	鬼	Guǐ	Ghost	天社	Tiānshè	Celestial Earth God's Temple					
The Vermilion Bird of the South (南方朱雀)	鬼	Guǐ	Ghost	天社	Tiānshè	Celestial Earth God's Temple	γ^{2} Vel		天社一	Tiānshèyī	1st star
The Vermilion Bird of the South (南方朱雀)	鬼	Guǐ	Ghost	天社	Tiānshè	Celestial Earth God's Temple	b Vel		天社二	Tiānshèèr	2nd star
The Vermilion Bird of the South (南方朱雀)	鬼	Guǐ	Ghost	天社	Tiānshè	Celestial Earth God's Temple	δ Vel	Alsephina (for component Aa)	天社三	Tiānshèsān	3rd star
The Vermilion Bird of the South (南方朱雀)	鬼	Guǐ	Ghost	天社	Tiānshè	Celestial Earth God's Temple	κ Vel	Markeb	天社五	Tiānshèwǔ	5th star
The Vermilion Bird of the South (南方朱雀)	鬼	Guǐ	Ghost	天社	Tiānshè	Celestial Earth God's Temple	N Vel		天社六	Tiānshèliù	6th star
The Vermilion Bird of the South (南方朱雀)	鬼	Guǐ	Ghost	天社	Tiānshè	Celestial Earth God's Temple	a Vel		天社增二	Tiānshèzēngèr	2nd additional star
The Vermilion Bird of the South (南方朱雀)	鬼	Guǐ	Ghost	天社	Tiānshè	Celestial Earth God's Temple	c Vel		天社增三	Tiānshèzēngsān	3rd additional star
The Vermilion Bird of the South (南方朱雀)	鬼	Guǐ	Ghost	天記	Tiānjì	Judge for Estimating the Age of Animals					
The Vermilion Bird of the South (南方朱雀)	鬼	Guǐ	Ghost	天記	Tiānjì	Judge for Estimating the Age of Animals	λ Vel	Suhail			
The Vermilion Bird of the South (南方朱雀)	鬼	Guǐ	Ghost	天記	Tiānjì	Judge for Estimating the Age of Animals	λ Vel	Suhail	天記	Tiānjì	(One star of)
The Vermilion Bird of the South (南方朱雀)	鬼	Guǐ	Ghost	天記	Tiānjì	Judge for Estimating the Age of Animals	λ Vel	Suhail	天潢西北星	Tiānhuángxīběixīng	Star in the northwest of Celestial Pier
The Vermilion Bird of the South (南方朱雀)	鬼	Guǐ	Ghost	天記	Tiānjì	Judge for Estimating the Age of Animals	ψ Vel		天記增一	Tiānjìzēngyī	1st additional star
The Vermilion Bird of the South (南方朱雀)	鬼	Guǐ	Ghost	天記	Tiānjì	Judge for Estimating the Age of Animals	q Vel		天記增二	Tiānjìzēngèr	2nd additional star
The Vermilion Bird of the South (南方朱雀)	翼	Yì	Wings	東甌	Dōngoū	Dongou	q Vel		東甌四	Dōngoūsì	4th star
The Vermilion Bird of the South (南方朱雀)	轸	Zhěn	Chariot	軍門	Jūnmén	Military Gate	HD 104039		軍門一	Jūnményī	1st star
-	近南極星區 (non-mansions)	Jìnnánjíxīngōu (non-mansions)	The Southern Asterisms (non-mansions)	海山	Hǎishān	Sea and Mountain					
-	近南極星區 (non-mansions)	Jìnnánjíxīngōu (non-mansions)	The Southern Asterisms (non-mansions)	海山	Hǎishān	Sea and Mountain	p Vel		海山增一	Hǎishānzēngyī	1st additional star
-	近南極星區 (non-mansions)	Jìnnánjíxīngōu (non-mansions)	The Southern Asterisms (non-mansions)	海山	Hǎishān	Sea and Mountain	μ Vel		海山增二	Hǎishānzēngèr	2nd additional star

== See also ==
- Traditional Chinese star names
- Chinese constellations
