= Gamma Octantis =

The Bayer designation γ Octantis (gamma Octantis, γ Oct) is shared by three stars, in the constellation Octans:

- γ^{1} Octantis, HR 9032 or HD 223647
- γ^{2} Octantis, HR 9061 or HD 224362
- γ^{3} Octantis, HR 30 or HD 636

The three form a chain of stars that can be individually discerned with the naked eye. Two are yellow giants and gamma–2 is an orange giant. They are not physically associated with each other.
