= Kucha Wei-Jin Tomb Museum =

Museum in Xinjiang, China

Kucha Wei-Jin Ancient Tomb Museum
- 龟兹魏晋古墓遗址博物馆; Qiūcí Wèijìn gǔmù yízhǐ bówùguǎn
- Established: July 15, 2024
- Location: Kucha, Xinjiang, China
- Coordinates: 41°42′43″N 82°57′28″E
- Type: Tomb Museum

The Kucha Wei-Jin Ancient Tomb Museum (Qiūcí Wèijìn gǔmù yízhǐ bówùguǎn 龟兹魏晋古墓遗址博物馆) is an underground tomb museum in Xinjiang. It is built on the original site of the nationally protected Kucha Youyi Road Tomb Cluster (库车友谊路墓群, Kùchē Yǒuyìlù Mùqún) and officially opened on July 15, 2024.

== History and significance ==
The Kucha Youyi Road Tomb Cluster was first uncovered in 2007 during construction work along Youyi Road in Kucha. Excavations by the Xinjiang Institute of Cultural Relics and Archaeology between 2007 and 2023 revealed over 2,000 burial features, including 15 fully excavated Han-style brick-chamber tombs dated to the Wei and Western Jin periods (3rd–5th centuries AD).

== Museum planning and construction ==
Planning and construction began after confirmation of the site’s archaeological importance. According to project reports, engineering measures were taken to protect the tomb chambers lying approximately 7–9 meters below the surface of Youyi Road. The underground exhibition covers approximately 5,000 m², preserving the original tomb layout in situ, while above-ground facilities house visitor reception.

== Architecture and exhibits ==
The museum exhibits 15 intact brick-chamber tombs in their original positions. Visitors can observe tomb doors (with spirit screens), corridors, burial chambers, and side chambers. Carved reliefs depict the Four Symbols: Azure Dragon (Qīnglóng 青龙), White Tiger (Báihǔ 白虎), Vermilion Bird (Zhūquè 朱雀), and Black Tortoise (Xuánwǔ 玄武). Artefacts displayed include pottery, bone ware, metal objects, and coins—some placed in the mouths or hands of the deceased, reflecting Wei–Jin funerary customs inherited from Central Plains traditions.
