= Crux in Chinese astronomy =

The modern constellation Crux is not included in the Three Enclosures and Twenty-Eight Mansions system of traditional Chinese uranography because its stars are too far south for observers in China to know about them prior to the introduction of Western star charts. Based on the work of Xu Guangqi and the German Jesuit missionary Johann Adam Schall von Bell in the late Ming Dynasty, this constellation has been classified as one of the 23 Southern Asterisms (近南極星區, jìn nán jí xīng qū) under the name Cross (十字架, shí zì jià).

Possibly Acrux (Alpha Crucis), Mimosa (Beta Crucis) and Gacrux (Gamma Crucis) are bright stars in this constellation that are never seen in Chinese sky.

The name of the western constellation in modern Chinese is 南十字座 (nán shí zì zuò), meaning "the southern cross-shaped constellation".

== Stars ==
The map of Chinese constellation in constellation Crux area consists of :

Four Symbols	Mansion (Chinese name)	Romanization	Translation	Asterisms (Chinese name)	Romanization	Translation	Western star name	Proper Name	Chinese star name	Romanization	Translation
-	近南極星區 (non-mansions)	Jìnnánjíxīngōu (non-mansions)	The Southern Asterisms (non-mansions)	十字架	Shízìjià	Cross					
-	近南極星區 (non-mansions)	Jìnnánjíxīngōu (non-mansions)	The Southern Asterisms (non-mansions)	十字架	Shízìjià	Cross	γ Cru	Gacrux	十字架一	Shízìjiàyī	1st star
-	近南極星區 (non-mansions)	Jìnnánjíxīngōu (non-mansions)	The Southern Asterisms (non-mansions)	十字架	Shízìjià	Cross	α Cru	Acrux			
-	近南極星區 (non-mansions)	Jìnnánjíxīngōu (non-mansions)	The Southern Asterisms (non-mansions)	十字架	Shízìjià	Cross	α Cru	Acrux	十字架二	Shízìjiàèr	2nd star
-	近南極星區 (non-mansions)	Jìnnánjíxīngōu (non-mansions)	The Southern Asterisms (non-mansions)	十字架	Shízìjià	Cross	α Cru	Acrux	四渎西南星	Sìdúxīnánxīng	Star in the southwest of Four Channels constellation
-	近南極星區 (non-mansions)	Jìnnánjíxīngōu (non-mansions)	The Southern Asterisms (non-mansions)	十字架	Shízìjià	Cross	β Cru	Mimosa	十字架三	Shízìjiàsān	3rd star
-	近南極星區 (non-mansions)	Jìnnánjíxīngōu (non-mansions)	The Southern Asterisms (non-mansions)	十字架	Shízìjià	Cross	δ Cru	Imai			
-	近南極星區 (non-mansions)	Jìnnánjíxīngōu (non-mansions)	The Southern Asterisms (non-mansions)	十字架	Shízìjià	Cross	δ Cru	Imai	十字架四	Shízìjiàsì	4th star
-	近南極星區 (non-mansions)	Jìnnánjíxīngōu (non-mansions)	The Southern Asterisms (non-mansions)	十字架	Shízìjià	Cross	δ Cru	Imai	座旗南星	Zuòqínánxīng	Star in the southwest of Seat Flags constellation
-	近南極星區 (non-mansions)	Jìnnánjíxīngōu (non-mansions)	The Southern Asterisms (non-mansions)	十字架	Shízìjià	Cross	ε Cru	Ginan	十字架增一	Shízìjiàzēngyī	1st additional star

== See also ==
- Chinese astronomy
- Traditional Chinese star names
- Chinese constellations
- List of brightest stars
