= Octans in Chinese astronomy =

The modern constellation Octans is not included in the Three Enclosures and Twenty-Eight Mansions system of traditional Chinese uranography because its stars are too far south for observers in China to know about them before the introduction of Western star charts. Based on the work of Xu Guangqi and the German Jesuit missionary Johann Adam Schall von Bell in the late Ming Dynasty, this constellation has been classified under the 23 Southern Asterisms (近南極星區, Jìnnánjíxīngōu) with the names Snake's Tail (蛇尾, Shéwěi) and Exotic Bird (異雀, Yìquè).

The name of the western constellation in modern Chinese is 南極座 (nán jí zuò), meaning "the south pole constellation".

== Stars ==
The map of Chinese constellation in constellation Octans area consists of:

Four Symbols	Mansion (Chinese name)	Romanization	Translation	Asterisms (Chinese name)	Romanization	Translation	Western star name	Chinese star name	Romanization	Translation
-	近南極星區 (non-mansions)	Jìnnánjíxīngōu (non-mansions)	The Southern Asterisms (non-mansions)	蛇尾	Shéwěi	Snake's Tail				
-	近南極星區 (non-mansions)	Jìnnánjíxīngōu (non-mansions)	The Southern Asterisms (non-mansions)	蛇尾	Shéwěi	Snake's Tail	γ^{1} Oct	蛇尾二	Shéwěièr	2nd star
-	近南極星區 (non-mansions)	Jìnnánjíxīngōu (non-mansions)	The Southern Asterisms (non-mansions)	蛇尾	Shéwěi	Snake's Tail	β Oct	蛇尾三	Shéwěisān	3rd star
-	近南極星區 (non-mansions)	Jìnnánjíxīngōu (non-mansions)	The Southern Asterisms (non-mansions)	蛇尾	Shéwěi	Snake's Tail	α Oct	蛇尾四	Shéwěisì	4th star
-	近南極星區 (non-mansions)	Jìnnánjíxīngōu (non-mansions)	The Southern Asterisms (non-mansions)	異雀	Yìquè	Exotic Bird	δ Oct	異雀五	Yìquèwǔ	5th star

== See also ==
- Chinese astronomy
- Traditional Chinese star names
- Chinese constellations
