= Alpha Pyxidis =

B-type giant star in the constellation Pyxis

- Location of α Pyxidis (circled)

Observation data Epoch J2000 Equinox J2000
- Constellation: Pyxis
- Right ascension: 08^{h} 43^{m} 35.53756^{s}
- Declination: −33° 11′ 10.9898″
- Apparent magnitude (V): 3.67

Characteristics
- Spectral type: B1.5III
- U−B color index: −0.84
- B−V color index: −0.19
- Variable type: Beta Cephei

Astrometry
Radial velocity (R_{v})	+15.3 km/s
Proper motion (μ)	RA: −14.27 mas/yr Dec.: +10.43 mas/yr
Parallax (π)	3.71±0.14 mas
Distance	880 ± 30 ly (270 ± 10 pc)
Absolute magnitude (M_{V})	−3.47

Details
Mass	10.7 M_{☉}
Radius	6.3 ± 1.0 R_{☉}
Luminosity	10,000 L_{☉}
Surface gravity (log g)	3.63 cgs
Temperature	24,300 K
Metallicity [Fe/H]	−0.18 dex
Rotational velocity (v sin i)	11 km/s

Other designations
- Alpha Pyx, α Pyx, CPD−32°2399, FK5 327, HD 74575, HIP 42828, HR 3468, SAO 199546

Database references
SIMBAD	data

Alpha Pyxidis, Latinised from α Pyxidis, is a giant star in the constellation Pyxis. It is the brightest star in Pyxis, and is easily visible to the naked eye. It has a stellar classification of B1.5III and is a Beta Cephei variable. This star has more than ten times the mass of the Sun and is more than six times the Sun's radius. The surface temperature is 24,300 K and the star is about 10,000 times as luminous as the Sun. Stars such as this with more than 10 solar masses are expected to end their life by exploding as a supernova.

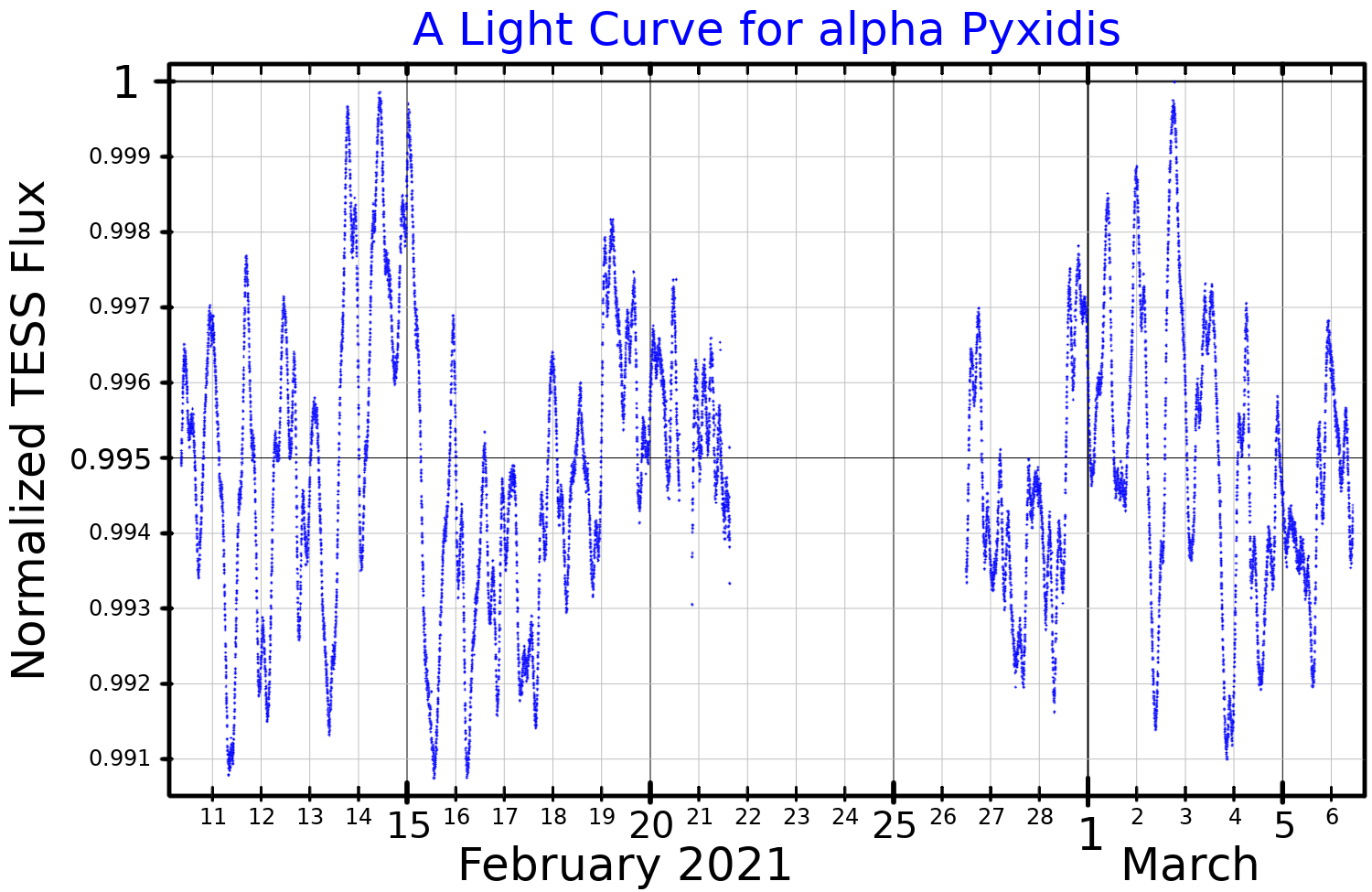
A light curve for Alpha Pyxidis, plotted from TESS data.

== Naming ==
In Chinese, 天狗 (Tiān Gǒu), meaning Celestial Dog, refers to an asterism consisting of α Pyxidis, e Velorum, f Velorum, β Pyxidis, γ Pyxidis and δ Pyxidis. Consequently, α Pyxidis itself is known as 天狗五 (Tiān Gǒu wǔ, English: the Fifth Star of Celestial Dog).
