= Dorado in Chinese astronomy =

The modern constellation Dorado is not included in the Three Enclosures and Twenty-Eight Mansions system of traditional Chinese uranography because its stars are too far south for observers in China to know about them prior to the introduction of Western star charts. Based on the work of Xu Guangqi and the German Jesuit missionary Johann Adam Schall von Bell in the late Ming Dynasty, this constellation has been classified under the 23 Southern Asterisms (近南極星區, Jìnnánjíxīngōu) with the names White Patches Attached (夾白, Jiābái) and Goldfish (金魚, Jīnyú).

The name of the western constellation in modern Chinese is 劍魚座 (jiàn yú zuò), meaning "the swordfish constellation".

== Stars ==
The map of Chinese constellation in constellation Dorado area consists of :

Four Symbols	Mansion (Chinese name)	Romanization	Translation	Asterisms (Chinese name)	Romanization	Translation	Western star name	Chinese star name	Romanization	Translation
-	近南極星區 (non-mansions)	Jìnnánjíxīngōu (non-mansions)	The Southern Asterisms (non-mansions)							
-	近南極星區 (non-mansions)	Jìnnánjíxīngōu (non-mansions)	The Southern Asterisms (non-mansions)	夾白	Jiābái	White Patches Attached	θ Dor	夾白一	Jiābáiyī	1st star
-	近南極星區 (non-mansions)	Jìnnánjíxīngōu (non-mansions)	The Southern Asterisms (non-mansions)	金魚	Jīnyú	Goldfish				
-	近南極星區 (non-mansions)	Jìnnánjíxīngōu (non-mansions)	The Southern Asterisms (non-mansions)	金魚	Jīnyú	Goldfish	γ Dor	金魚一	Jīnyúyī	1st star
-	近南極星區 (non-mansions)	Jìnnánjíxīngōu (non-mansions)	The Southern Asterisms (non-mansions)	金魚	Jīnyú	Goldfish	α Dor	金魚二	Jīnyúèr	2nd star
-	近南極星區 (non-mansions)	Jìnnánjíxīngōu (non-mansions)	The Southern Asterisms (non-mansions)	金魚	Jīnyú	Goldfish	β Dor	金魚三	Jīnyúsān	3rd star
-	近南極星區 (non-mansions)	Jìnnánjíxīngōu (non-mansions)	The Southern Asterisms (non-mansions)	金魚	Jīnyú	Goldfish	δ Dor	金魚四	Jīnyúsì	4th star
-	近南極星區 (non-mansions)	Jìnnánjíxīngōu (non-mansions)	The Southern Asterisms (non-mansions)	金魚	Jīnyú	Goldfish	η^{2} Dor	金魚五	Jīnyúwu	5th star

== See also ==
- Chinese astronomy
- Traditional Chinese star names
- Chinese constellations
