= Gamma Pyxidis =

K-type giant star in the constellation Pyxis

γ Pyxidis
- Location of γ Pyxidis (circled)

Observation data Epoch J2000 Equinox ICRS
- Constellation: Pyxis
- Right ascension: 08^{h} 50^{m} 31.92282^{s}
- Declination: −27° 42′ 35.4421″
- Apparent magnitude (V): 4.010

Characteristics
- Evolutionary stage: red clump
- Spectral type: K3 III
- U−B color index: +1.368
- B−V color index: +1.284

Astrometry
Radial velocity (R_{v})	+24.5±0.7 km/s
Proper motion (μ)	RA: −134.31 mas/yr Dec.: 87.89 mas/yr
Parallax (π)	15.73±0.17 mas
Distance	207 ± 2 ly (63.6 ± 0.7 pc)
Absolute magnitude (M_{V})	+0.00

Details
Mass	1.64 M_{☉}
Radius	21.87 R_{☉}
Luminosity	178 L_{☉}
Surface gravity (log g)	2.35 cgs
Temperature	4,270 K
Metallicity [Fe/H]	−0.05 dex
Age	4.29±2.49 Gyr

Other designations
- γ Pyx, CPD−27°3442, FK5 332, GC 12216, HD 75691, HIP 43409, HR 3518, SAO 176559

Database references
SIMBAD	data

Gamma Pyxidis, Latinized from γ Pyxidis, is a single, orange-hued star in the southern constellation Pyxis. It is visible to the naked eye, having an apparent visual magnitude of 4.010. Based upon an annual parallax shift of 15.73 mas as seen from Earth, it is located about 207 light years from the Sun. The star is moving further from the Sun with a radial velocity of +24.5 km/s.

== Properties ==
This is an evolved K-type giant star with a stellar classification of K3 III. It is a red clump star on the horizontal branch, indicating that it is generating energy through helium fusion at its core. The composition of the stellar atmosphere is similar to the Sun, having roughly the same abundance of iron in its spectrum. The star has an estimated 1.64 times the mass of the Sun and has expanded to nearly 22 times the Sun's radius. At the age of around four billion years, it is radiating 178 times the Sun's luminosity from its enlarged photosphere at an effective temperature of 4,270 K.

Gamma Pyxidis is moving through the Galaxy at a speed of 54.2 km/s relative to the Sun. Its projected Galactic orbit carries it between 21,300 and 30,700 light years from the center of the Galaxy.

== Naming ==
In Chinese, 天狗 (Tiān Gǒu), meaning Celestial Dog, refers to an asterism consisting of γ Pyxidis, e Velorum, f Velorum, β Pyxidis, α Pyxidis and δ Pyxidis. Consequently, γ Pyxidis itself is known as 天狗六 (Tiān Gǒu liù, English: the Sixth Star of Celestial Dog.)
