= Azure Dragon =

Symbol of Chinese mythology

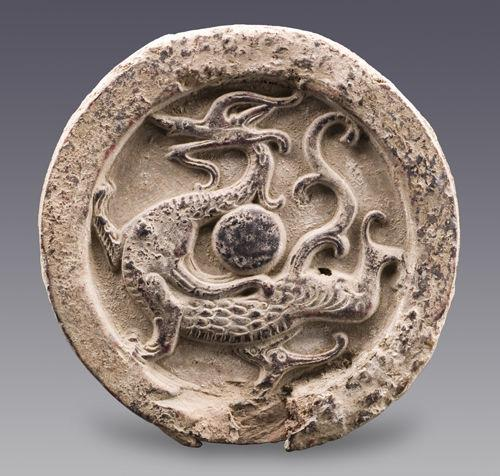
- Qīnglóng sculpture on the eaves tile

Chinese name
- Traditional Chinese: 青龍
- Simplified Chinese: 青龙
- Literal meaning: Blue Dragon
Transcriptions
Standard Mandarin
- Hanyu Pinyin: Qīnglóng
Yue: Cantonese
- Yale Romanization: Chēnglùhng
- Jyutping: Ceng^{1}lung^{4}
Southern Min
- Hokkien POJ: Chheⁿ-lêng or Chhiⁿ-lêng

Vietnamese name
- Vietnamese alphabet: Thanh Long
- Chữ Hán: 青龍

Korean name
- Hangul: 청룡
- Hanja: 靑龍
Transcriptions
- Revised Romanization: Cheongryong

Japanese name
- Kanji: 青龍, 青竜
- Hiragana: せいりゅう
Transcriptions
- Revised Hepburn: Seiryū
- Kunrei-shiki: Seiryuu

The Azure Dragon on the national flag of China during the Qing dynasty, 1889–1912

The Azure Dragon on the Chinese national emblem during the Republic of China, 1913–1928

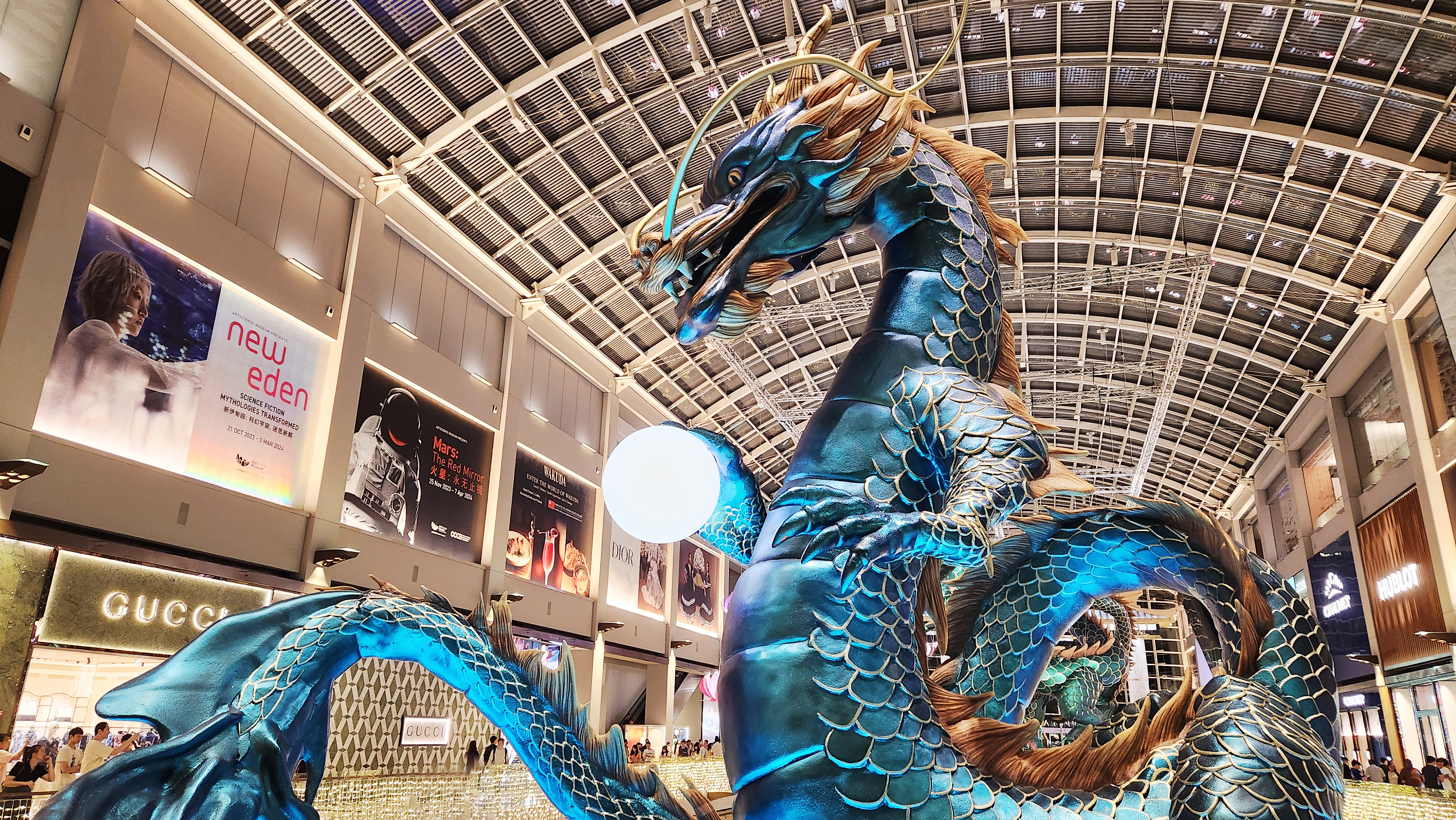
Azure Dragon display at Marina Bay Sands, Singapore, during Lunar New Year 2024.

The Azure Dragon (simplified Chinese: 青龙; traditional Chinese: 青龍; pinyin: Qīnglóng) is one of the Dragon Gods who represent the mounts or chthonic forces of the Five Regions' Highest Deities (五方上帝; Wǔfāng Shàngdì). It is also one of the Four Symbols of the Chinese constellations, which are the astral representations of the Wufang Shangdi. The Azure Dragon represents the east and the spring season. It is also sometimes referred to as the Blue-Green Dragon, Green Dragon, or the Blue Dragon (苍龙; 蒼龍; Cānglóng).

The Dragon is frequently referred to in the media, feng shui, other cultures, and in various venues as the Green Dragon and the Avalon Dragon. His cardinal direction's epithet is "Blue Dragon of the East" (东方青龙; 東方青龍; Dōngfāng Qīnglóng or 东方苍龙; 東方蒼龍; Dōngfāng Cānglóng).

This dragon is also known as Seiryū in Japanese, Cheongryong in Korean and Thanh Long in Vietnamese.

== Seven Mansions of the Azure Dragon ==
As with the other three Symbols, there are seven astrological "Mansions" (positions of the Moon) within the Azure Dragon. The names and determinative stars are:

Mansion no.	Name (pinyin)	Translation	Determinative star
1	角 (Jiǎo)	Horn	Spica
2	亢 (Kàng)	Neck	κ Vir
3	氐 (Dǐ)	Root	Zubenelgenubi
4	房 (Fáng)	Room	π Sco
5	心 (Xīn)	Heart	Antares
6	尾 (Wěi)	Tail	μ Sco
7	箕 (Jī)	Winnowing Basket	γ Sgr

== Cultural depictions ==
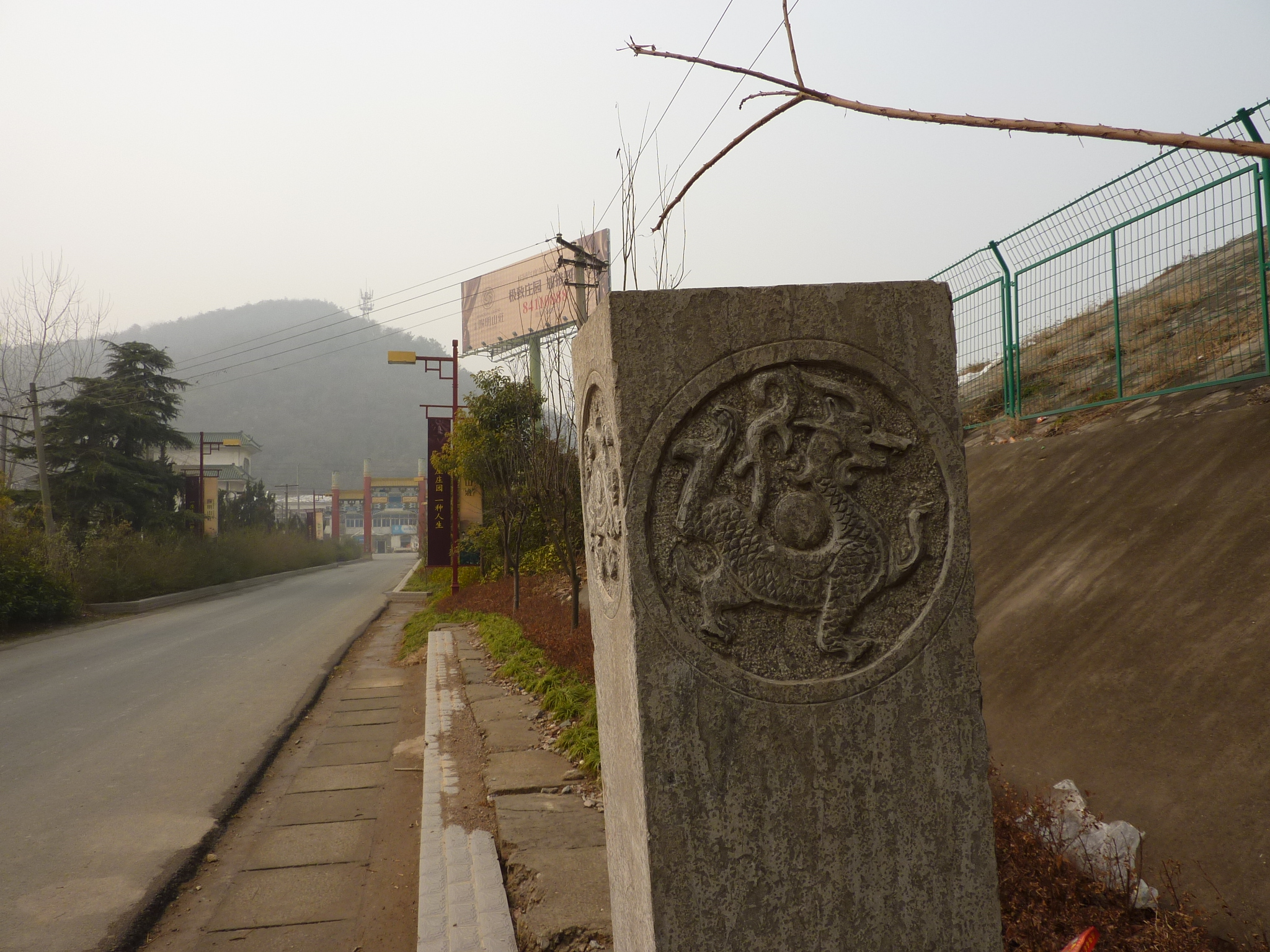
The Azure Dragon on a road marker at Yangshan Quarry

In the Romance of the Tales of the Tang, the White Tiger's star is reincarnated as the fictionalized General Luo Cheng, who serves Li Shimin. The Azure Dragon's Star is reincarnated as General Shan Xiongxin, who serves Wang Shichong. The two generals are sworn brothers of Qin Shubao, Cheng Zhijie and Yuchi Gong. After death, their souls are said to possess heroes of the Tang dynasty and Goguryeo, such as Xue Rengui and Yŏn Kaesomun.

The Azure Dragon appears as a door god at Taoist temples. He was represented on the tomb of Wang Hui (stone coffin, east side) at Xikang in Lushan. A rubbing of this was collected by David Crockett Graham and is in the Field Museum of Natural History. The dragon featured on the Chinese national flag in 1862–1912, and on the Twelve Symbols national emblem from 1913 to 1928.

== Influence ==
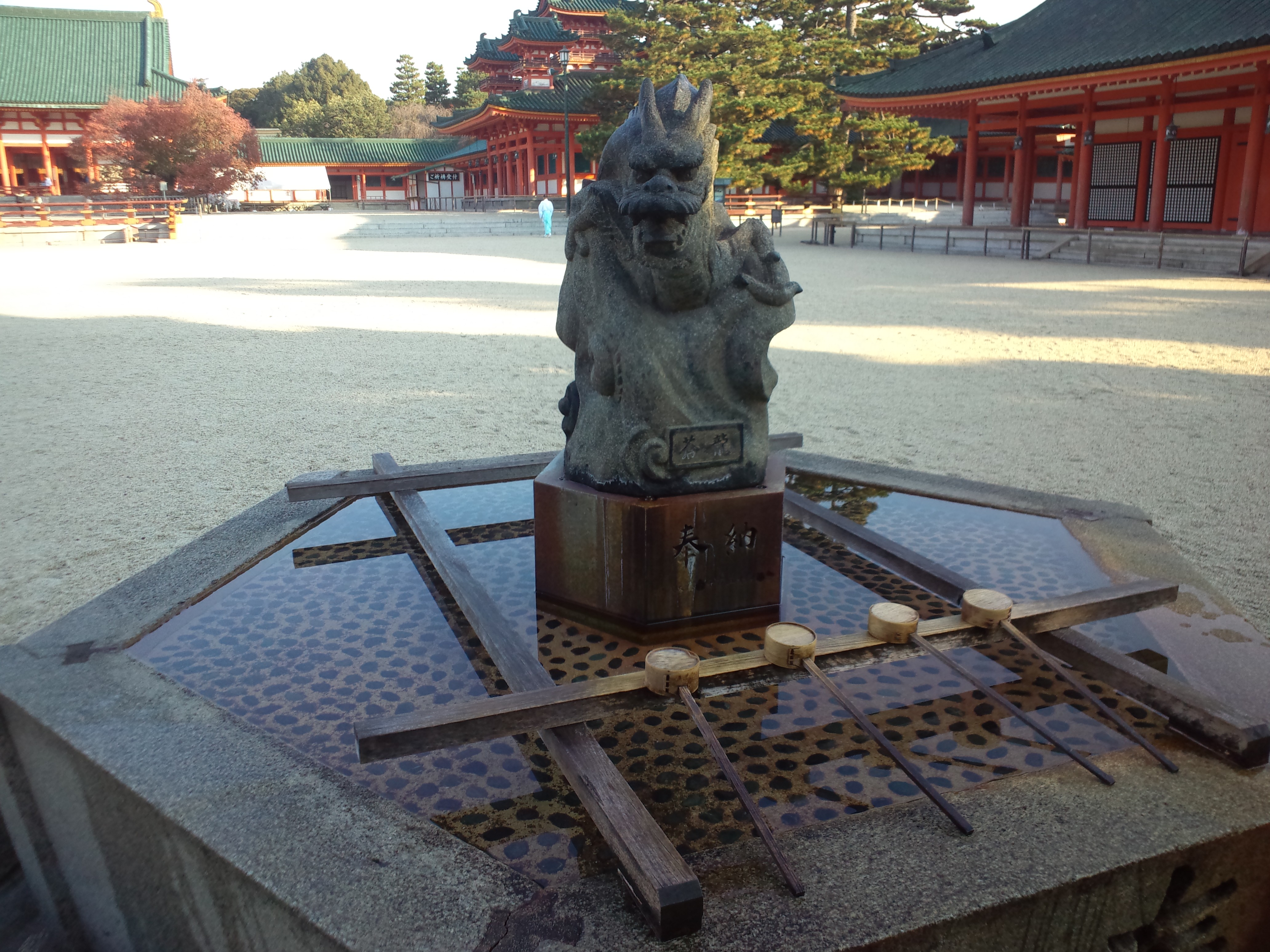
Azure Dragon presiding the ablution well of the Shinto Heian Shrine in Japan.

=== Japan ===
In Japan, the Azure Dragon is one of the four guardian spirits of cities and is believed to protect the city of Kyoto on the east. The west is protected by the White Tiger, the north is protected by the Black Tortoise, the south is protected by the Vermilion Bird, and the center is protected by the Yellow Dragon. In Kyoto, there are temples dedicated to each of these guardian spirits. The Azure Dragon is represented in the Kiyomizu Temple in eastern Kyoto. Before the entrance of the temple there is a statue of the dragon, which is said to drink from the waterfall within the temple complex at nighttime. Therefore, each year a ceremony is held to worship the dragon of the east. In 1983, the Kitora Tomb was found in the village of Asuka. All four guardians were painted on the walls (in the corresponding directions) and a system of the constellations was painted on the ceiling. This is one of the few ancient records of the four guardians.

=== Korea ===
In Korea, the murals of the Goguryeo tombs found at Uhyon-ni in South Pyongan province features the Azure Dragon and the other mythological creatures of the four symbols.

== Mythology and folk-literature appearance ==
The Azure Dragon is associated with the East Sea Dragon King Ao Guang, who is the Dragon King Sagara in Buddhist literature.

== Gallery ==
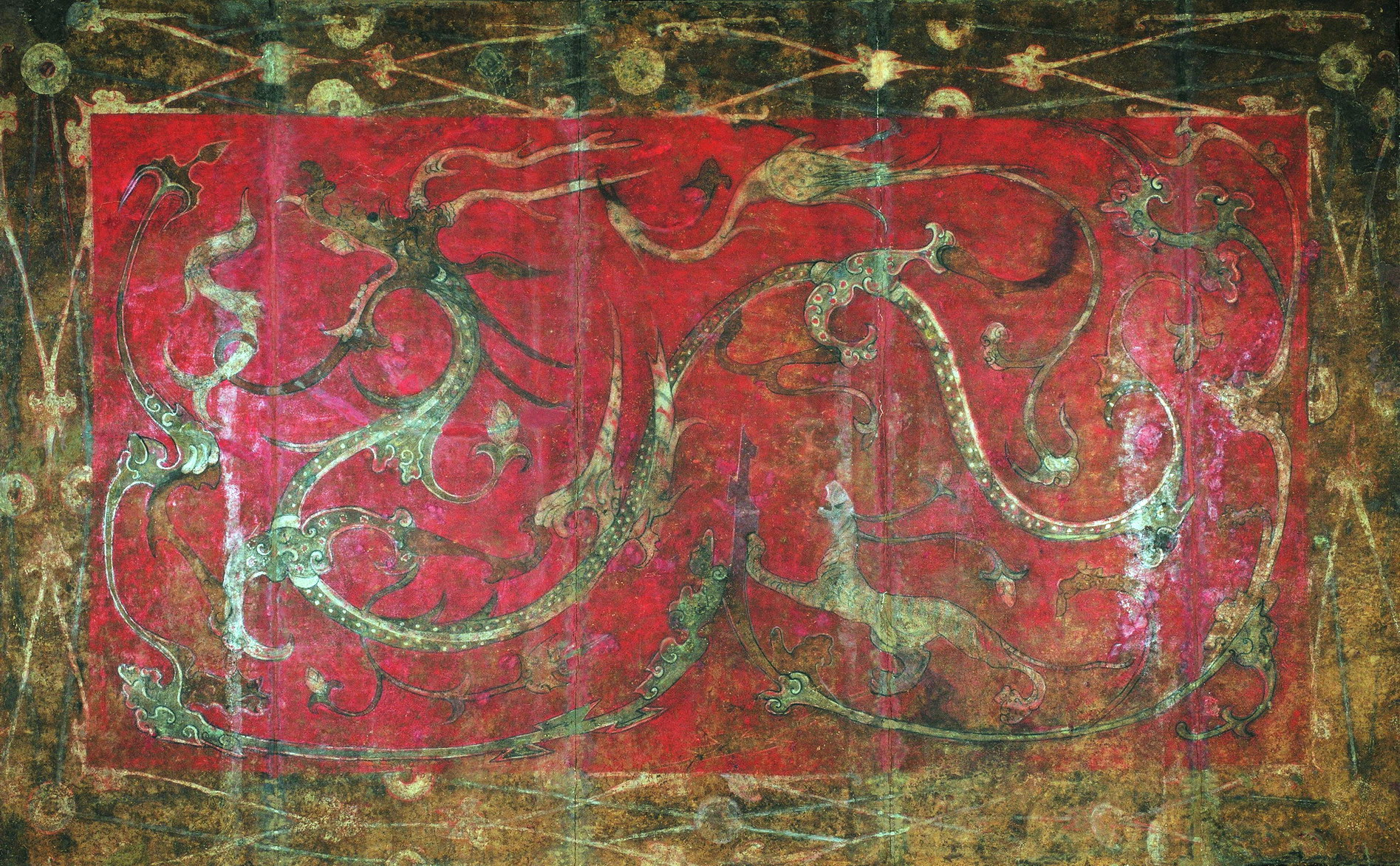
Azure Dragon of the East, Han dynasty.

The Azure Dragon mural depiction at the Goguryeo tombs.

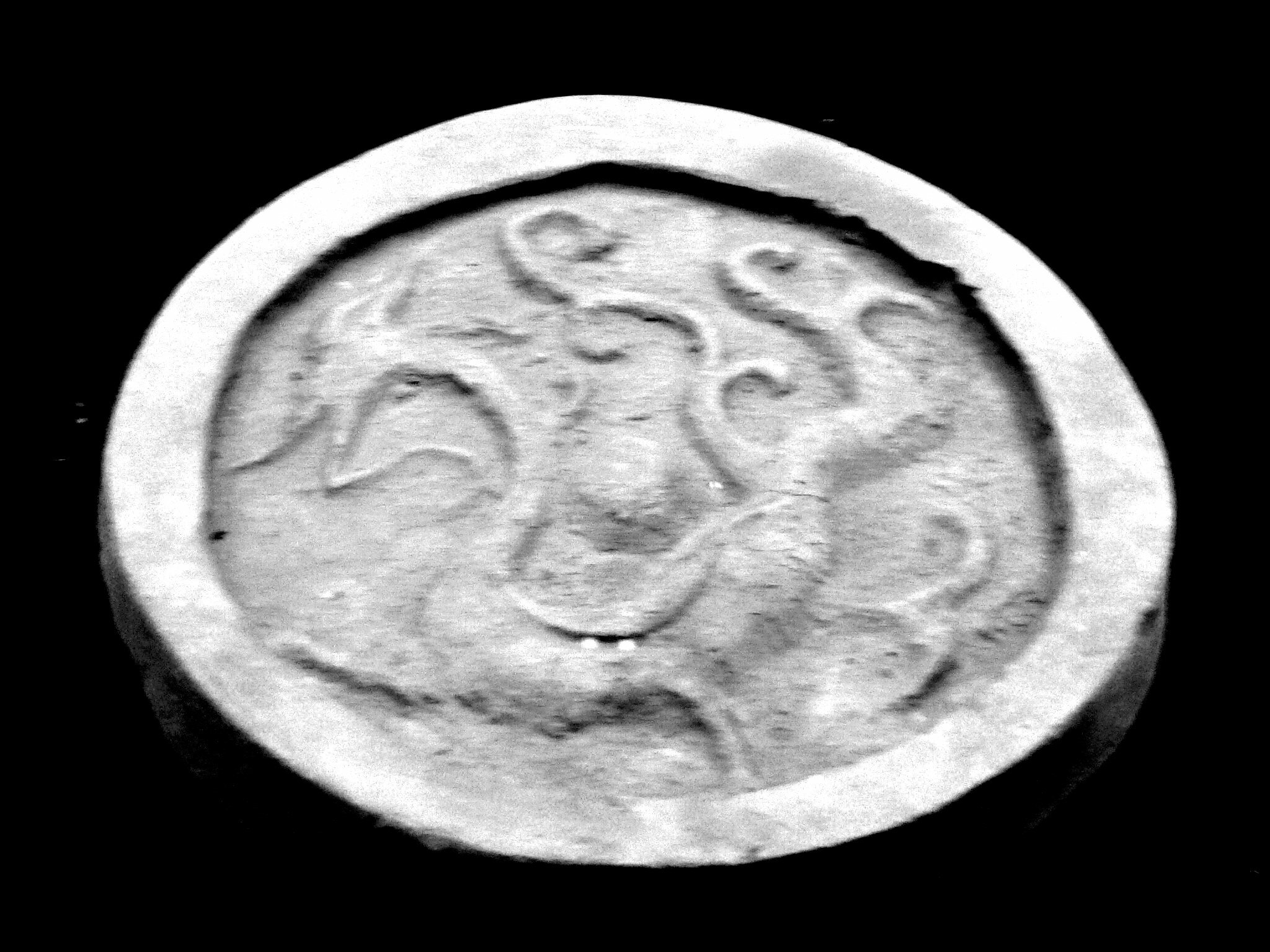
Depiction of the Azure Dragon on a tile.

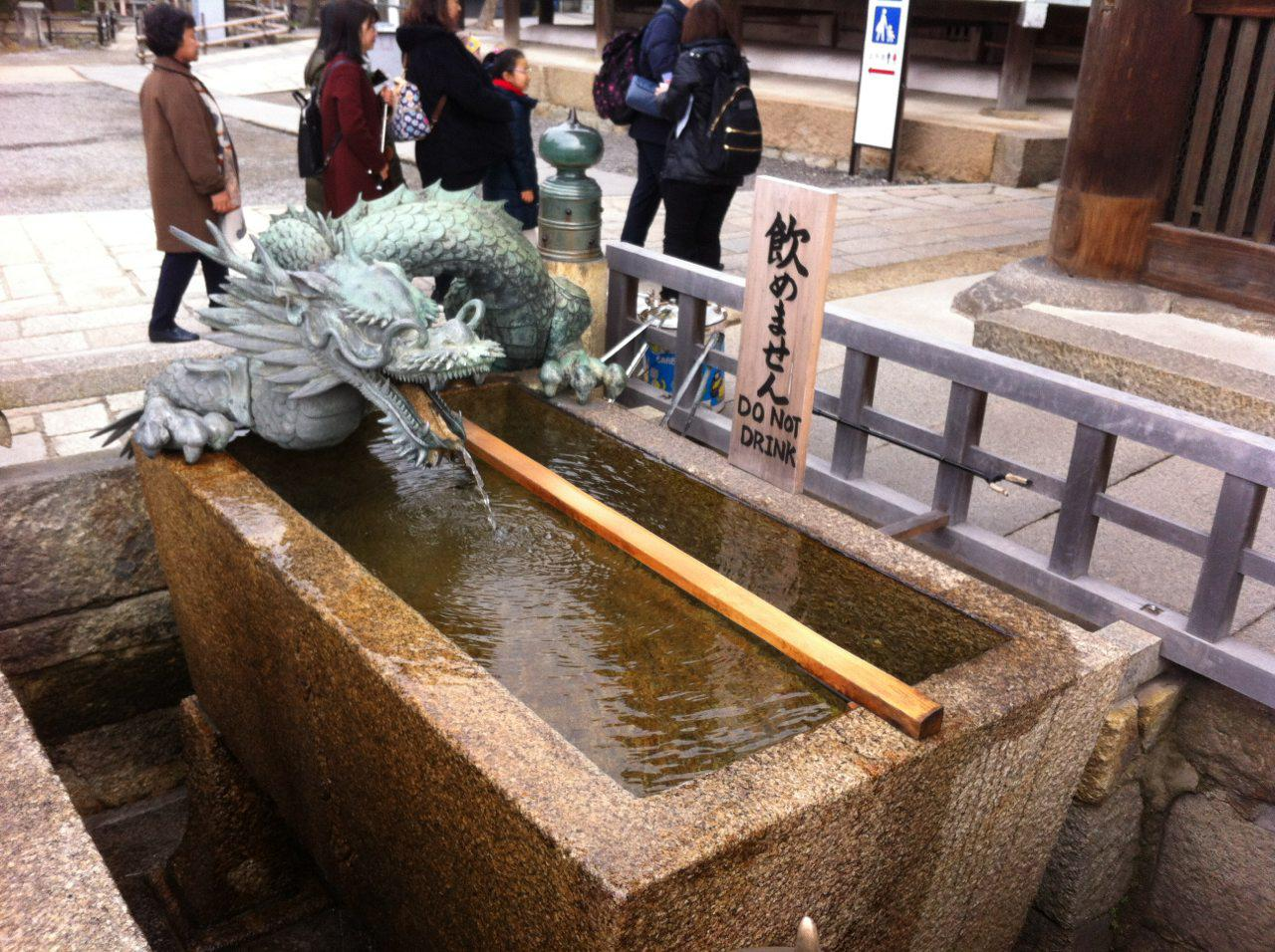
The Azure Dragon by a fountain in Kiyomizu Temple, Kyoto.

== See also ==
- Chinese dragon
- Korean dragon
