= Sculptor in Chinese astronomy =

The modern constellation Sculptor is not included in the Three Enclosures and Twenty-Eight Mansions system of traditional Chinese uranography because its stars are too far south for observers in China to know about them prior to the introduction of Western star charts. Based on the work of Xu Guangqi and the German Jesuit missionary Johann Adam Schall von Bell in the late Ming Dynasty, this constellation has been classified as one of the 23 Southern Asterisms (近南極星區, Jìnnánjíxīngōu) under the name Firebird (火鳥, Huōdiǎo), together with the stars in Phoenix.

The name of the western constellation in modern Chinese is 玉夫座 (yù fū zuò), meaning "jade worker constellation".

== Stars ==
The map of Chinese constellation in constellation Sculptor area consists of :

Four Symbols	Mansion (Chinese name)	Romanization	Translation	Asterisms (Chinese name)	Romanization	Translation	Western star name	Chinese star name	Romanization	Translation
-	近南極星區 (non-mansions)	Jìnnánjíxīngōu (non-mansions)	The Southern Asterisms (non-mansions)	火鳥	Huǒniǎo	Firebird	β Scl	火鳥一	Huǒniǎoyī	1st star

== See also ==
- Chinese astronomy
- Traditional Chinese star names
- Chinese constellations
