= Gamma3 Octantis =

Star in the constellation Octans

γ^{3} Octantis
- Location of γ^{3} Octantis (circled)

Observation data Epoch J2000.0 Equinox J2000.0 (ICRS)
- Constellation: Octans
- Right ascension: 00^{h} 10^{m} 02.17249^{s}
- Declination: −82° 13′ 26.5695″
- Apparent magnitude (V): 5.28±0.01

Characteristics
- Evolutionary stage: Horizontal branch
- Spectral type: K1/2 III
- U−B color index: +0.92
- B−V color index: +1.05

Astrometry
Radial velocity (R_{v})	15±2.8 km/s
Proper motion (μ)	RA: −22.050 mas/yr Dec.: −20.218 mas/yr
Parallax (π)	12.3535±0.0517 mas
Distance	264 ± 1 ly (80.9 ± 0.3 pc)
Absolute magnitude (M_{V})	+0.83

Details
Mass	2.23±0.09 M_{☉}
Radius	9.94±0.24 R_{☉}
Luminosity	50.5±1.2 L_{☉}
Surface gravity (log g)	2.78±0.15 cgs
Temperature	4,879±51 K
Metallicity [Fe/H]	+0.19±0.04 dex
Rotational velocity (v sin i)	<1 km/s

Other designations
- γ^{3} Octantis, 1 G. Octantis, CPD−82°4, FK5 3971, GC 173, HD 636, HIP 814, HR 30, SAO 258215

Database references
SIMBAD	data

Gamma^{3} Octantis, Latinized from γ^{3} Octantis, is a solitary star located in the southern circumpolar constellation Octans. It is faintly visible to the naked eye as an orange-hued star with an apparent magnitude of 5.28. The object is located relatively close at a distance of 264 light years but is receding with a heliocentric radial velocity of 15 km/s. At its current distance, Gamma^{3} Octantis' brightness is diminished by two tenths of a magnitude due to interstellar dust and Eggen (1993) lists it as a member of the old disk population. It has an absolute magnitude of +0.83.

Gamma^{3} Octantis has a stellar classification of K1/2 III, indicating that it is an evolved K-type star with the characteristics of a K1 and K2 giant star. It is a red clump star that is currently on the horizontal branch, fusing helium at its core. At present it has 2.23 times the mass of the Sun but has expanded to almost 10 times its girth. It radiates 50.5 times the luminosity of the Sun from its enlarged photosphere at an effective temperature of 4,879 K, which gives it a yellowish-orange glow. Gamma^{3} Octantis is metal enriched with an iron abundance 1.55 times that of the Sun and common for giant stars, spins slowly with a projected rotational velocity less than 1 km/s.

== Stars sharing the Gamma designation ==
The stars Gamma^{1}, Gamma^{2} Octantis, and Gamma^{3} Octantis all lie within a degree of each other and all are red clump giants with luminosities of 50 to 60 L_{☉}. Based on parallax measurements from Gaia Data Release 3, the magnitude 5 Gamma^{1} Octantis and Gamma^{3} Octantis are at very similar distances of 268 and 264 light years respectively. Gamma^{2} Octantis is considerably further away at 320 light years and consequently is about half a magnitude fainter than the other two stars.
