= Delta Pyxidis =

Binary star system in the constellation Pyxis

- Location of δ Pyxidis (circled)

Observation data Epoch J2000.0 Equinox J2000.0 (ICRS)
- Constellation: Pyxis
- Right ascension: 08^{h} 55^{m} 31.56948^{s}
- Declination: −27° 40′ 54.7315″
- Apparent magnitude (V): +4.877

Characteristics
- Evolutionary stage: main sequence
- Spectral type: A3 IV
- U−B color index: +0.224
- B−V color index: +0.130

Astrometry
Radial velocity (R_{v})	5.4±0.8 km/s
Proper motion (μ)	RA: +81.90 mas/yr Dec.: −100.43 mas/yr
Parallax (π)	13.19±0.77 mas
Distance	250 ± 10 ly (76 ± 4 pc)
Absolute magnitude (M_{V})	+0.67

Details
Mass	1.84 M_{☉}
Radius	1.6 R_{☉}
Luminosity	59 L_{☉}
Surface gravity (log g)	3.77±0.14 cgs
Temperature	8,609±293 K
Rotational velocity (v sin i)	68 km/s
Age	296 Myr

Other designations
- δ Pyx, CPD−27°3497, HD 76483, HIP 43825, HR 3556, SAO 176697, WDS J08555-2741A

Database references
SIMBAD	data

Delta Pyxidis (δ Pyxidis) is binary star system in southern constellation of Pyxis. Having an apparent visual magnitude of +4.877, it is bright enough to be visible to the naked eye. Based upon an annual parallax shift of 13.19 mas as seen from Earth, it is located around 250 light years from the Sun.

In Chinese, 天狗 (Tiān Gǒu), meaning Celestial Dog, refers to an asterism consisting of δ Pyxidis, e Velorum, f Velorum, β Pyxidis, α Pyxidis and γ Pyxidis. Consequently, δ Pyxidis itself is known as 天狗七 (Tiān Gǒu qī, English: the Seventh Star of Celestial Dog.)

This is an astrometric binary system, as determined by changes in the proper motion of the primary. The visible component has a stellar classification of A3 IV, indicating it has the spectrum of an A-type subgiant star that is consuming the last of the hydrogen at its core. At the age of around 296 million years, it is 92.5% of the way through its main sequence lifetime and is spinning with a projected rotational velocity of 68 km/s. The star has an estimated 1.8 times the mass of the Sun and about 1.6 times the Sun's radius. It is radiating 59 times the Sun's luminosity from its photosphere at an effective temperature of roughly 8,609 K.
