= Chinese constellations =

Celestial groupings used in Chinese astrology

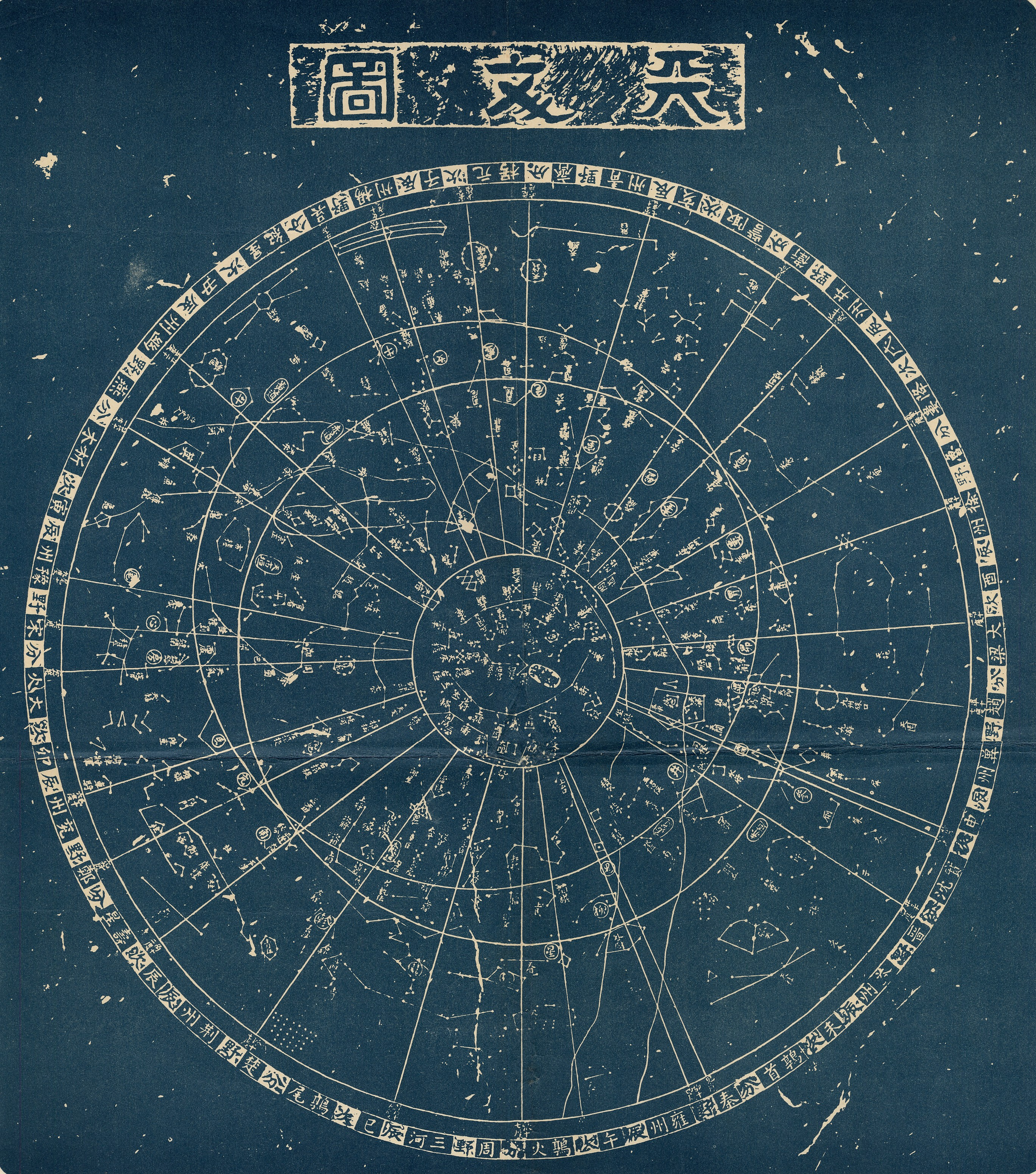
Reproduction of the Suzhou star chart (13th century)

Traditional Chinese astronomy has a system of dividing the celestial sphere into asterisms or constellations, known as "officials" (Chinese: 星官; pinyin: xīng guān).

The Chinese asterisms are generally smaller than the constellations of Hellenistic tradition. The Song dynasty (13th-century) Suzhou planisphere shows a total of 283 asterisms, comprising a total of 1,565 individual stars. The asterisms are divided into four groups, the Twenty-Eight Mansions (二十八宿; Èrshíbā Xiù) along the ecliptic, and the Three Enclosures of the northern sky. The southern sky was added as a fifth group in the late Ming dynasty based on European star charts, comprising an additional 23 asterisms.

The Three Enclosures (三垣; Sān Yuán) include the Purple Forbidden Enclosure, which is centered on the north celestial pole and includes those stars which could be seen year-round, while the other two straddle the celestial equator.

The Twenty-Eight Mansions form an ecliptic coordinate system used for those stars visible (from China) but not during the whole year, based on the movement of the Moon over a lunar month.

== History ==
The Chinese system developed independently from the Greco-Roman system since at least the 5th century BC, although there may have been earlier mutual influence, suggested by parallels to ancient Babylonian astronomy.

The system of twenty-eight lunar mansions is very similar (although not identical) to the Indian Nakshatra system, and it is not currently known if there was mutual influence in the history of the Chinese and Indian systems.

The oldest extant Chinese star maps date to the Tang dynasty. Notable among them are the 8th-century Treatise on Astrology of the Kaiyuan Era and Dunhuang Star Chart. It contains collections of earlier Chinese astronomers (Shi Shen, Gan De and Wu Xian) as well as of Indian astronomy (which had reached China in the early centuries AD). Gan De was a Warring States era (5th century BC) astronomer who according to the testimony of the Dunhuang Star Chart enumerated 810 stars in 138 asterisms. The Dunhuang Star Chart itself has 1,585 stars grouped into 257 asterisms.

The number of asterisms, or of stars grouped into asterisms, never became fixed, but remained in the same order of magnitude (for the purpose of comparison, the star catalogue compiled by Ptolemy in the 2nd century had 1,022 stars in 48 constellations). The 13th-century Suzhou star chart has 1,565 stars in 283 asterisms, the 14th-century Korean Cheonsang Yeolcha Bunyajido has 1,467 stars in 264 asterisms, and the celestial globe made by Flemish Jesuit Ferdinand Verbiest for the Kangxi Emperor in 1673 has 1,876 stars in 282 asterisms.

The southern sky was unknown to the ancient Chinese and is consequently not included in the traditional system. With European contact in the 16th century, Xu Guangqi, an astronomer of the late Ming dynasty, introduced another 23 asterisms based on European star charts. The "Southern Asterisms" (近南極星區) are now also treated as part of the traditional Chinese system.

== Terminology ==
The Chinese word for "star, heavenly body" is 星 xīng. The character 星 originally had a more complicated form: 曐, a phono-semantic character (形聲字) whose semantic portion, 晶, originally depicting three twinkling stars (three instances of the "sun" radical 日).

The modern Chinese term for "constellation", referring to those as defined by the IAU system, is 星座 (xīng zuò). The older term 星官 (xīng guān) is used only in describing constellations of the traditional system. The character 官's main meaning is "public official" (hence the English translation "officials" for the Chinese asterisms), it historically could also meant "official's residence".

The generic term for "asterism" is 星群 (xīng qún, lit. "group of stars").

== Three Enclosures ==
The Three Enclosures are the Purple Forbidden enclosure (紫微垣; Zǐ Wēi Yuán), the Supreme Palace enclosure (太微垣; Tài Wēi Yuán) and the Heavenly Market enclosure (天市垣; Tiān Shì Yuán).

The Purple Forbidden Enclosure occupies the northernmost area of the night sky. From the viewpoint of the ancient Chinese, the Purple Forbidden Enclosure lies in the middle of the sky and is circled by all the other stars. It covers the Greek constellations Ursa Minor, Draco, Camelopardalis, Cepheus, Cassiopeia, Auriga, Boötes, and parts of Ursa Major, Canes Venatici, Leo Minor and Hercules.

The Supreme Palace Enclosure covers the Greek constellations Virgo, Coma Berenices and Leo, and parts of Canes Venatici, Ursa Major and Leo Minor.

The Heavenly Market Enclosure covers the Greek constellations Serpens, Ophiuchus, Aquila and Corona Borealis, and parts of Hercules.

The Three Enclosures are each enclosed by two "wall" asterisms, designated 垣; yuán "low wall, fence; enclosure" (not to be confused with the lunar mansion "Wall" 壁):

- Purple Forbidden Left Wall 紫微左垣 (Cassiopeia / Cepheus / Draco)
- Purple Forbidden Right Wall 紫微右垣 (Draco / Ursa Major / Camelopardalis)
- Supreme Palace Left Wall 太微左垣 (Virgo / Coma Berenices)
- Supreme Palace Right Wall 太微右垣 (Leo / Virgo)
- Heavenly Market Left Wall 天市左垣 (Hercules / Serpens / Ophiuchus / Aquila)
- Heavenly Market Right Wall 天市右垣 (Serpens / Ophiuchus / Hercules)

== The Twenty-Eight Mansions ==
A modern star chart showing the traditional Chinese asterisms, with the 24 solar terms indicated on the border of each hemisphere.

The Twenty-Eight Mansions are grouped into Four Symbols, each associated with a compass direction and containing seven mansions. The names and determinative stars are:

Four Symbols (四象)	Mansion (宿)				
Four Symbols (四象)	Number	Name (pinyin)	Translation	Determinative star (traditional)	Determinative star (Qing dynasty)
Azure Dragon of the East (東方蒼龍); Spring	1	角 (Jué/Jiăo)	Horn	α Vir (Spica)	α Vir (Spica)
Azure Dragon of the East (東方蒼龍); Spring	2	亢 (Kàng)	Neck	κ Vir (Kang)	κ Vir (Kang)
Azure Dragon of the East (東方蒼龍); Spring	3	氐 (Dī)	Root	α^{2} Lib (Zubenelgenubi)	α^{2} Lib (Zubenelgenubi)
Azure Dragon of the East (東方蒼龍); Spring	4	房 (Fáng)	Room	π Sco (Fang)	π Sco (Fang)
Azure Dragon of the East (東方蒼龍); Spring	5	心 (Xīn)	Heart	σ Sco (Alniyat)	σ Sco (Alniyat)
Azure Dragon of the East (東方蒼龍); Spring	6	尾 (Wěi)	Tail	μ^{1} Sco (Xamidimura)	μ^{1} Sco (Xamidimura)
Azure Dragon of the East (東方蒼龍); Spring	7	箕 (Jī)	Winnowing Basket	γ Sgr (Alnasl)	γ Sgr (Alnasl)
Black Tortoise of the North (北方玄武); Winter	8	斗 (Dǒu)	(Southern) Dipper	φ Sgr (Nandou)	φ Sgr (Nandou)
Black Tortoise of the North (北方玄武); Winter	9	牛 (Niú)	Ox	β Cap (Dabih)	β Cap (Dabih)
Black Tortoise of the North (北方玄武); Winter	10	女 (Nǚ)	Girl	ε Aqr (Albali)	ε Aqr (Albali)
Black Tortoise of the North (北方玄武); Winter	11	虛 (Xū)	Emptiness	β Aqr (Sadalsuud)	β Aqr (Sadalsuud)
Black Tortoise of the North (北方玄武); Winter	12	危 (Wéi/Wēi)	Roof	α Aqr (Sadalmelik)	α Aqr (Sadalmelik)
Black Tortoise of the North (北方玄武); Winter	13	室 (Shì)	Encampment	α Peg (Markab)	α Peg (Markab)
Black Tortoise of the North (北方玄武); Winter	14	壁 (Bì)	Wall	γ Peg (Algenib)	γ Peg (Algenib)
White Tiger of the West (西方白虎); Fall	15	奎 (Kuí)	Legs	ζ And (Shimu)	η And (Kui)
White Tiger of the West (西方白虎); Fall	16	婁 (Lóu)	Bond	β Ari (Sheratan)	β Ari (Sheratan)
White Tiger of the West (西方白虎); Fall	17	胃 (Wèi)	Stomach	35 Ari (Weixiu)	35 Ari (Weixiu)
White Tiger of the West (西方白虎); Fall	18	昴 (Mǎo)	Hairy Head	17 Tau (Electra)	17 Tau (Electra)
White Tiger of the West (西方白虎); Fall	19	畢 (Bì)	Net	ε Tau (Ain)	ε Tau (Ain)
White Tiger of the West (西方白虎); Fall	20	觜 (Zī)	Turtle Beak	φ^{1} Ori	λ Ori (Meissa)
White Tiger of the West (西方白虎); Fall	21	參 (Cǎn/Shēn)	Three Stars	δ Ori (Mintaka)	ζ Ori (Alnitak)
Vermilion Bird of the South (南方朱雀); Summer	22	井 (Jǐng)	Well	μ Gem (Tejat)	μ Gem (Tejat)
Vermilion Bird of the South (南方朱雀); Summer	23	鬼 (Guǐ)	Ghost	θ Cnc	θ Cnc
Vermilion Bird of the South (南方朱雀); Summer	24	柳 (Liǔ)	Willow	δ Hya	δ Hya
Vermilion Bird of the South (南方朱雀); Summer	25	星 (Xīng)	Star	α Hya (Alphard)	α Hya (Alphard)
Vermilion Bird of the South (南方朱雀); Summer	26	張 (Zhāng)	Extended Net	υ¹ Hya (Zhang)	υ¹ Hya (Zhang)
Vermilion Bird of the South (南方朱雀); Summer	27	翼 (Yì)	Wings	α Crt (Alkes)	α Crt (Alkes)
Vermilion Bird of the South (南方朱雀); Summer	28	軫 (Zhěn)	Chariot	γ Crv (Gienah)	γ Crv (Gienah)

== The Southern Asterisms ==
The sky around the south celestial pole was unknown to ancient Chinese. Therefore, it was not included in the Three Enclosures and Twenty-Eight Mansions system. However, by the end of the Ming dynasty, Xu Guangqi introduced another 23 asterisms based on the knowledge of European star charts. These asterisms were since incorporated into the traditional Chinese star maps.

The asterisms are:

English name	Chinese name	Number of stars	IAU Constellation
Sea and Mountain	海山 (Hǎi Shān)	4	Carina/Centaurus/Musca/Vela
Cross	十字架 (Shí Zì Jià)	4	Crux
Horse's Tail	馬尾 (Mǎ Wěi)	3	Centaurus
Horse's Abdomen	馬腹 (Mǎ Fù)	3	Centaurus
Bee	蜜蜂 (Mì Fēng)	4	Musca
Triangle	三角形 (Sān Jiǎo Xíng)	3	Triangulum Australe
Exotic Bird	異雀 (Yì Què)	9	Apus / Octans
Peacock	孔雀 (Kǒng Què)	11	Pavo
Persia	波斯 (Bō Sī)	11	Indus / Telescopium
Snake's Tail	蛇尾 (Shé Wěi)	4	Octans / Hydrus
Snake's Abdomen	蛇腹 (Shé Fù)	4	Hydrus
Snake's Head	蛇首 (Shé Shǒu)	2	Hydrus / Reticulum
Bird's Beak	鳥喙 (Niǎo Huì)	7	Tucana
Crane	鶴 (Hè)	12	Grus / Tucana
Firebird	火鳥 (Huǒ Niǎo)	10	Phoenix / Sculptor
Crooked Running Water	水委 (Shuǐ Wěi)	3	Eridanus / Phoenix
White Patches Nearby (Note: "White Patches" refers to the Magellanic Clouds.)	附白 (Fù Bái)	2	Hydrus
White Patches Attached	夾白 (Jiā Bái)	2	Reticulum / Dorado
Goldfish	金魚 (Jīn Yú)	5	Dorado
Sea Rock	海石 (Hǎi Dàn)	5	Carina
Flying Fish	飛魚 (Fēi Yú)	6	Volans
Southern Boat	南船 (Nán Chuán)	5	Carina
Little Dipper	小斗 (Xiǎo Dǒu)	9	Chamaeleon

== Chinese star names ==
Ancient Chinese astronomers designated names to the visible stars systematically, roughly more than one thousand years before Johann Bayer did it in a similar way. Basically, every star is assigned to an asterism. Then a number is given to the individual stars in this asterism. Therefore, a star is designated as "Asterism name" + "Number". The numbering of the stars in an asterism, however, is not based on the apparent magnitude of this star, but rather its position in the asterism. The Bayer system uses this Chinese method occasionally, most notably with the stars in the Big Dipper, which are all about the same magnitude; in turn, the stars of the Big Dipper, 北斗 in Chinese, are numbered in Chinese astronomy in the same order as with the Bayer designations, with Dubhe first in both cases.

For example, Altair is named 河鼓二 in Chinese. 河鼓 is the name of the asterism (literally the Drum at the River). 二 is the number designation (two). Therefore, it literally means "the Second Star of the Drum at the River". (Bayer might have called Altair "Beta Tympani Flumine" if he had been cataloguing Chinese constellations.)

Some stars also have traditional names, often related to mythology or astrology. For example, Altair is more commonly known as 牛郎星 or 牵牛星 (the Star of the Cowherd) in Chinese, after the mythological story of the Cowherd and Weaver Girl.

These designations are still used in modern Chinese astronomy. All stars for which the traditional names are used in English are routinely translated by their traditional Chinese designations, rather than translations of their catalogue names.

=== By modern IAU constellation ===
The following is a list of the 88 IAU constellations with the Chinese translation of their names. Each linked article provides a list of the (traditional) Chinese names of the stars within each (modern) constellation.

- Andromeda (仙女座)
- Antlia (唧筒座)
- Apus (天燕座)
- Aquarius (寶瓶座)
- Aquila (天鷹座)
- Ara (天壇座)
- Aries (白羊座)
- Auriga (御夫座)
- Boötes (牧夫座)
- Caelum (雕具座)
- Camelopardalis (鹿豹座)
- Cancer (巨蟹座)
- Canes Venatici (獵犬座)
- Canis Major (大犬座)
- Canis Minor (小犬座)
- Capricornus (摩羯座)
- Carina (船底座)
- Cassiopeia (仙后座)
- Centaurus (半人馬座)
- Cepheus (仙王座)
- Cetus (鯨魚座)
- Chamaeleon (蝘蜓座)
- Circinus (圓規座)
- Columba (天鴿座)
- Coma Berenices (后髮座)
- Corona Australis (南冕座)
- Corona Borealis (北冕座)
- Corvus (烏鴉座)
- Crater (巨爵座)
- Crux (南十字座)
- Cygnus (天鵝座)
- Delphinus (海豚座)
- Dorado (劍魚座)
- Draco (天龍座)
- Equuleus (小馬座)
- Eridanus (波江座)
- Fornax (天爐座)
- Gemini (雙子座)
- Grus (天鶴座)
- Hercules (武仙座)
- Horologium (時鐘座)
- Hydra (長蛇座)
- Hydrus (水蛇座)
- Indus (印第安座)
- Lacerta (蝎虎座)
- Leo (獅子座)
- Leo Minor (小獅座)
- Lepus (天兔座)
- Libra (天秤座)
- Lupus (豺狼座)
- Lynx (天貓座)
- Lyra (天琴座)
- Mensa (山案座)
- Microscopium (顯微鏡座)
- Monoceros (麒麟座)
- Musca (蒼蠅座)
- Norma (矩尺座)
- Octans (南極座)
- Ophiuchus (蛇夫座)
- Orion (獵戶座)
- Pavo (孔雀座)
- Pegasus (飛馬座)
- Perseus (英仙座)
- Phoenix (鳳凰座)
- Pictor (繪架座)
- Pisces (雙魚座)
- Piscis Austrinus (南魚座)
- Puppis (船尾座)
- Pyxis (羅盤座)
- Reticulum (網罟座)
- Sagitta (天箭座)
- Sagittarius (人馬座)
- Scorpius (天蝎座)
- Sculptor (玉夫座)
- Scutum (盾牌座)
- Serpens (巨蛇座)
- Sextans (六分儀座)
- Taurus (金牛座)
- Telescopium (望遠鏡座)
- Triangulum (三角座)
- Triangulum Australe (南三角座)
- Tucana (杜鵑座)
- Ursa Major (大熊座)
- Ursa Minor (小熊座)
- Vela (船帆座)
- Virgo (室女座)
- Volans (飛魚座)
- Vulpecula (狐狸座)

== See also ==
- Chinese calendar
- Chinese star maps
- Dunhuang Star Chart
- Five elements (Chinese)
- Four Symbols (Chinese constellation)
- Lunar mansion
- Nakshatra
- Traditional Chinese star names
