= Beta Pyxidis =

Double star in the constellation Pyxis

- Location of β Pyxidis (circled)

Observation data Epoch J2000 Equinox J2000
- Constellation: Pyxis
- Right ascension: 08^{h} 40^{m} 06.14^{s}
- Declination: −35° 18′ 30.0″
- Apparent magnitude (V): 3.954

Characteristics
- Spectral type: G7II/III
- U−B color index: +0.646
- B−V color index: +0.935

Astrometry
Radial velocity (R_{v})	−13.4 km/s
Proper motion (μ)	RA: +9.84 mas/yr Dec.: −20.80 mas/yr
Parallax (π)	7.84±0.19 mas
Distance	420 ± 10 ly (128 ± 3 pc)
Absolute magnitude (M_{V})	−1.196±0.093

Details
Mass	3.77±0.18 M_{☉}
Radius	20±1 R_{☉}
Luminosity	283±25 L_{☉}
Surface gravity (log g)	2.68±0.09 cgs
Temperature	5,283±59 K
Metallicity [Fe/H]	−0.06±0.053 dex
Rotational velocity (v sin i)	11.8 km/s

Other designations
- β Pyx, Beta Pyx, CPD−34 2846, FK5 2681, HD 74006, HIP 42515, HR 3438, SAO 199490, WDS J08401-3518A

Database references
SIMBAD	data

Beta Pyxidis, Latinized from β Pyxidis, is a double star located in the southern constellation Pyxis. It has an apparent visual magnitude of 3.954, making it the second brightest star in that faint constellation. Based upon parallax measurements, the star is an estimated 420 light-years (128 parsecs) from the Earth.

The spectrum matches a bright giant or giant star of stellar classification G7II-III. It has 3.8 times the mass of the Sun but has expanded to 20 times the Sun's radius. The effective temperature of the star's outer envelope is about 5,283 K, giving it the characteristic yellow hue of a G-type star. Beta Pyxidis has an unusually high rate of spin for an evolved star of this type, showing a projected rotational velocity of 11.8 km/s. One possible explanation is that it may have engulfed a nearby giant planet, such as a hot Jupiter.

In 2010, the star was among a survey of massive, lower effective temperature supergiants in an attempt to detect a magnetic field. This star may have a longitudinal magnetic field with a strength of less than a Gauss. It is a young disk star system with space velocity components, [U, V, W] = [–11.0, +11.8, –2.2] km/s. There is a magnitude 12.5 optical companion, located at an angular separation of 12.7 arcseconds and a position angle of 118° as of the year 1943.

== Naming ==
In Chinese, 天狗 (Tiān Gǒu), meaning Celestial Dog, refers to an asterism consisting of β Pyxidis, e Velorum, f Velorum, α Pyxidis, γ Pyxidis and δ Pyxidis. Consequently, β Pyxidis itself is known as 天狗四 (Tiān Gǒu sì, English: the Fourth Star of Celestial Dog.)
