= Root (Chinese constellation) =

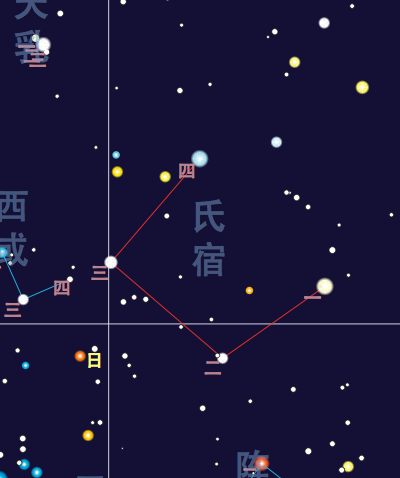
Dī Xiù map

The Root mansion (氐宿, pinyin: Dī Xiù) is one of the twenty-eight mansions of the Chinese constellations. It is one of the eastern mansions of the Azure Dragon.

== Asterisms ==
| English name | Chinese name | European constellation | Number of stars | Representing |
|---|---|---|---|---|
| Root | 氐 | Libra | 4 | Root in the sky, it means Azure Dragon's chest and the front foot |
| Celestial Milk | 天乳 | Serpens | 1(+4) | Prince's mother, or the Yellow Emperor's wet nurse |
| Twinkling Indicator | 招搖 | Boötes | 1 | Hand-held contradicted enemy |
| Celestial Lance | 梗河 | Boötes | 3 | Spear or shield |
| Mattress of the Emperor | 帝席 | Boötes | 3 | The Emperor's banquet seats |
| Boats and Lake | 亢池 | Boötes/Virgo | 4 | The boat beside the pool |
| Battle Chariots | 陣車 | Lupus/Hydra | 3 | The chariots |
| Imperial Guards | 騎官 | Lupus/Centaurus | 10 | The imperial guard |
| Chariots and Cavalry | 車騎 | Lupus | 3 | The chariots and cavalry |
| Celestial Spokes | 天輻 | Libra | 2 | Officials of the vehicle management |
| Chariots and Cavalry General | 騎陣將軍 | Lupus | 1 | The general who responsible for chariots and cavalry |
