= Winnowing Basket (constellation) =

Chinese constellation

The Winnowing Basket mansion (箕宿, pinyin: Jī Xiù) is one of the Twenty-Eight Mansions of the Chinese constellations. It is one of the eastern mansions of the Azure Dragon.

== Asterisms ==
English name	Chinese name	European constellation	Number of stars	Representing
Winnowing Basket	箕	Sagittarius	4	Azure Dragon's dung, the role of rice bran to farm implements, also means the wind
Chaff	糠	Ophiuchus	1	Lift out of bran
Pestle	杵	Ara	3	Trace compounds wooden club
