= Three Stars (Chinese constellation) =

Group of seven stars

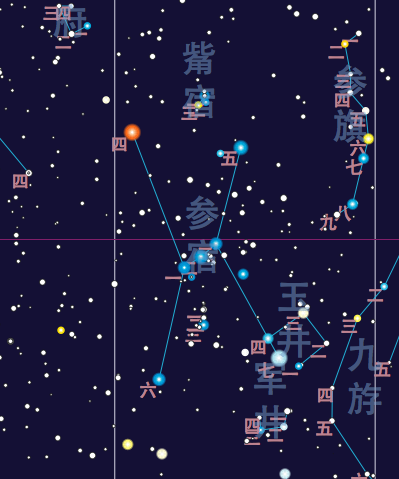
Shēn Xiù map

The Three Stars mansion (simplified Chinese: 参宿; traditional Chinese: 參宿; pinyin: Shēn Xiù) is one of the twenty-eight mansions of the Chinese constellations. It is one of the western mansions of the White Tiger. This collection of seven bright stars is visible during winter in the Northern Hemisphere (summer in the Southern).

== Asterisms ==
English name	Chinese name	European constellation	Number of stars
Three Stars	參 Shen	Orion	7
Punishment	伐 Fa	Orion	3
Jade Well	玉井 Yu Jing	Orion/Eridanus	4
Screen	屏 Ping	Lepus	2
Military well	軍井 Jun Jing	Lepus	4
Toilet	廁 Ce	Lepus	4
Excrement	屎 Shi	Columba	1
