= Horn (Chinese constellation) =

One of the Twenty-eight mansions of the Chinese constellations

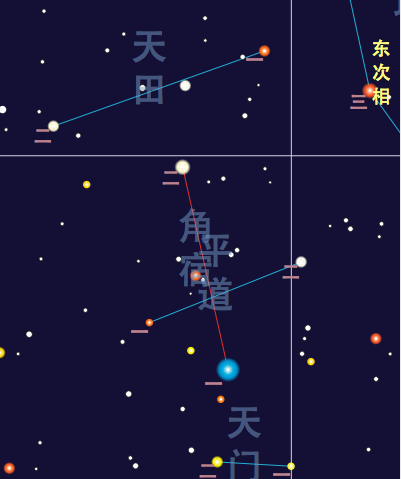
Jiǎo Xiù map

The Horn mansion (角宿, pinyin: Jiǎo Xiù) is one of the Twenty-eight mansions of the Chinese constellations. It is one of the eastern mansions of the Azure Dragon.

== Asterisms ==
English name	Chinese name	European constellation	Number of stars	Representing
Horn	角	Virgo	2	Azure Dragon's angle
Flat Road	平道	Virgo	2	Officer's road
Celestial Farmland	天田	Virgo	2	The son of heaven
Recommending Virtuous Men	進賢	Virgo	1 (+9)	The recommended virtuous men
Tripod of the Zhou	周鼎	Coma Berenices	3	The God Tripod or imperial power
Celestial Gate	天門	Virgo	2	The door of the zodiac
Justice	平	Hydra	2	Judge prison decree
Arsenal	庫樓	Centaurus	10	The armory
Pillars	柱	Centaurus/Lupus	11	Pillars which support the library floor
Railings	衡	Centaurus	4	Hall side railings where soldiers practice
Southern Gate	南門	Centaurus	2	Library House South Gate
