= Room (Chinese constellation) =

Chinese constellation

The Room mansion (房宿, pinyin: Fáng Xiù) is one of the Twenty-eight mansions of the Chinese constellations. It is one of the eastern mansions of the Azure Dragon.

== Asterisms ==
English name	Chinese name	European constellation	Number of stars	Representing
Room	房	Scorpius	4	Azure Dragon's belly
Lock	鉤鈐	Scorpius	4	Room accommodation or the keys of Room
Door Bolt	鍵閉	Scorpius	1	Door bolt
Punishment	罰	Scorpius/Libra	3	Atonement property
Eastern Door	東咸	Ophiuchus	4	Eastern gateway from the crafty harassment
Western Door	西咸	Scorpius/Libra	4	Western gateway from the crafty harassment
Sun	日	Libra	1(+1)	Official time
Retinue	從官	Lupus	2	Witch doctor or military
