= Heart (Chinese constellation) =

Mansion in Chinese astronomy

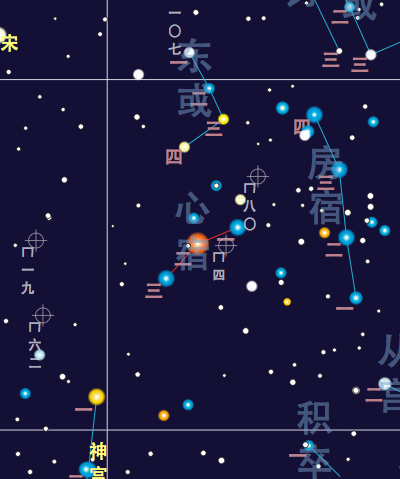
Xīn Xiù map

The Heart mansion (Chinese: 心宿; pinyin: Xīn Xiù; also called 商宿; Shāng Xiù) is one of the Twenty-eight mansions of the Chinese constellations. It is one of the eastern mansions of the Azure Dragon. Its prominent figure is the star Alpha Scorpii.

== Asterisms ==
English name	Chinese name	European constellation	Number of stars	Representing
Heart	心	Scorpius	3	Azure Dragon's heart
Group of Soldiers	積卒	Lupus	2	Military
