= D Velorum =

The Bayer designations d Velorum and D Velorum are distinct. Due to technical limitations, both designations link here.

For the star :

- d Velorum, see HD 74772 (HR 3477)
- D Velorum, see HD 74753 (HR 3476)

== See also ==
- δ Velorum (Delta Velorum)
