= Turtle Beak =

Part of the Chinese constellation system

The Turtle Beak mansion (觜宿, pinyin: Zī Xiù) is one of the twenty-eight mansions of the Chinese constellations. It is one of the western mansions of the White Tiger.

== Asterisms ==
English name	Chinese name	European constellation	Number of stars
Turtle Beak	觜	Orion	3
Deity in Charge of Monsters	司怪	Orion/Taurus/Gemini	4
Seat Flags	座旗	Auriga/Lynx	9
