= HD 88955 =

Star in the constellation Vela

- Location of HD 88955 (circled)

Observation data Epoch J2000 Equinox ICRS
- Constellation: Vela
- Right ascension: 10^{h} 14^{m} 44.1557^{s}
- Declination: −42° 07′ 18.989″
- Apparent magnitude (V): 3.85

Characteristics
- Evolutionary stage: main sequence
- Spectral type: A2 V
- B−V color index: +0.051±0.005

Astrometry
Radial velocity (R_{v})	+7.4±2.7 km/s
Proper motion (μ)	RA: −149.929 mas/yr Dec.: +49.548 mas/yr
Parallax (π)	31.6369±0.1684 mas
Distance	103.1 ± 0.5 ly (31.6 ± 0.2 pc)
Absolute magnitude (M_{V})	1.39

Details
Mass	2.17 M_{☉}
Radius	2.11 R_{☉}
Luminosity	23.24 L_{☉}
Surface gravity (log g)	4.08±0.14 cgs
Temperature	9,451±321 K
Metallicity [Fe/H]	−0.02 dex
Rotational velocity (v sin i)	100±4 km/s
Age	410 Myr

Other designations
- q Velorum, CD−41°5713, FK5 382, GC 14076, HD 88955, HIP 50191, HR 4023, SAO 221895

Database references
SIMBAD	data

HD 88955 is a single, white-hued star in the southern constellation of Vela. It can be viewed with the naked eye, having an apparent visual magnitude of 3.85. The distance to HD 88955 can be determined from its annual parallax shift of 31.6 mas, which yields a distance of 103 light years from the Sun. It is moving further from the Earth with a heliocentric radial velocity of +7 km/s. Bayesian analysis suggests HD 88955 is a member of the Argus Association, a group of co-moving stars usually associated with the IC 2391 open cluster.

This is an A-type main-sequence star with a stellar classification of A2 V. It is about 410 million years old with a projected rotational velocity of 100 km/s. The star has 2.17 times the mass of the Sun and 2.11 times the Sun's radius. It is radiating 23 times the Sun's luminosity from its photosphere at an effective temperature of 9,451 K. An infrared excess has been detected from HD 88955, which analysis suggests is a (3.6±3.0)×10^{−7} M_{🜨} debris disc with a mean temperature of 138±21 K orbiting the host star at an average distance of 19.3±5.7 AU.
