= HD 74772 =

Star in the constellation Vela

- Location of d Velorum (circled in red)

Observation data Epoch J2000 Equinox ICRS
- Constellation: Vela
- Right ascension: 08^{h} 44^{m} 23.94539^{s}
- Declination: −42° 38′ 57.3933″
- Apparent magnitude (V): 4.05

Characteristics
- Spectral type: G6 III
- B−V color index: 0.874±0.002

Astrometry
Radial velocity (R_{v})	−2.0±0.3 km/s
Proper motion (μ)	RA: −22.641 mas/yr Dec.: +19.137 mas/yr
Parallax (π)	15.7791±0.3148 mas
Distance	207 ± 4 ly (63 ± 1 pc)
Absolute magnitude (M_{V})	−0.18

Details
Mass	3.2 M_{☉}
Radius	12 R_{☉}
Luminosity	128.02 L_{☉}
Surface gravity (log g)	2.50 cgs
Temperature	5,210 K
Metallicity [Fe/H]	−0.03 dex
Rotational velocity (v sin i)	5.8 km/s

Other designations
- d Vel, CD−42°4569, GJ 9276, HD 74772, HIP 42884, HR 3477, SAO 220371, WDS J08444-4239A

Database references
SIMBAD	data

HD 74772 (d Velorum) is a single star in the southern constellation of Vela. It is positioned near the Vela SNR, which gives it an intense X-ray background. The star is of apparent visual magnitude 4.05, and hence is visible to the naked eye. Based upon an annual parallax shift of 15.8 mas, it is located 207 light years from the Sun. It is moving closer to the Earth with a heliocentric radial velocity of −2 km/s.

This is an evolved G-type giant star with a stellar classification of G6 III. The interferometry-measured angular diameter of this star is 1.73±0.12 mas, which, at its estimated distance, equates to a physical radius of about 12 times the radius of the Sun. It has 3.2 times the mass of the Sun and is radiating 128 times the Sun's luminosity from its enlarged photosphere at an effective temperature of 5,210 K.
