= Wings (Chinese constellation) =

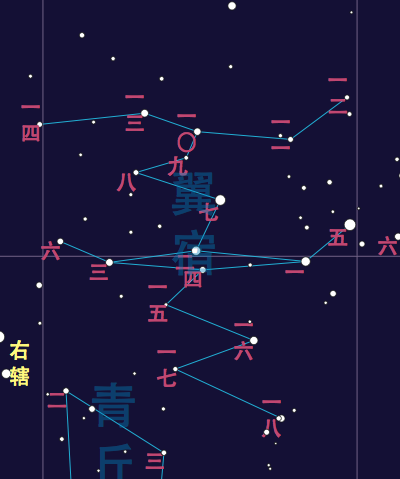
Yì Xiù map

The Wings mansion (翼宿, pinyin: Yì Xiù) is one of the Twenty-eight mansions of the Chinese constellations. It is one of the southern mansions of the Vermilion Bird.

== Asterisms ==
English name	Chinese name	European constellation	Number of stars
Wings	翼	Crater/Hydra/Sextans	22
Dongou	東甌	Antlia/Vela	5
