= HD 73634 =

Star in the constellation Vela

- Location of e Velorum (circled in red)

Observation data Epoch J2000.0 (ICRS) Equinox ICRS
- Constellation: Vela
- Right ascension: 08^{h} 37^{m} 38.63278^{s}
- Declination: −42° 59′ 20.6894″
- Apparent magnitude (V): +4.11

Characteristics
- Spectral type: A7Ia or A6II
- B−V color index: 0.109±0.011

Astrometry
Radial velocity (R_{v})	+19.3±0.6 km/s
Proper motion (μ)	RA: −10.75±0.13 mas/yr Dec.: +9.66±0.12 mas/yr
Parallax (π)	1.79±0.15 mas
Distance	1,800 ± 200 ly (560 ± 50 pc)
Absolute magnitude (M_{V})	−4.61

Details
Mass	7.8±0.2 M_{☉}
Radius	33.69+2.42 −3.24 R_{☉}
Luminosity	4,140.2±594.5 L_{☉}
Temperature	7,977+415 −271 K
Age	39.8±4.9 Myr

Other designations
- e Vel, CD−42°4451, FK5 324, GC 11852, HD 73634, HIP 42312, HR 3426, SAO 220204

Database references
SIMBAD	data

HD 73634 is a single star in the southern constellation of Vela. It has the Bayer designation e Velorum; HD 73634 is the star's designation from the Henry Draper Catalogue. The star is white in hue and is faintly visible to the naked eye, having an apparent visual magnitude of +4.11. Parallax measurements provide a distance estimate of approximately 1,800 light years from the Sun. It is drifting further away with a radial velocity of +19 km/s.

This evolved object has received stellar classifications of A7Ia and A6II, indicating that it is a massive supergiant or bright giant star. It has 7.8 times the mass of the Sun and is around 40 million years old. The star has expanded to nearly 34 times the girth of the Sun and is radiating around 4,140 times the Sun's luminosity from its enlarged photosphere at an effective temperature of 7,977 K.
