= Kappa Virginis =

Solitary K-type star in the constellation Virgo

κ Virginis (Kang)
- Location of κ Virginis (circled)

Observation data Epoch J2000.0 Equinox J2000.0
- Constellation: Virgo
- Right ascension: 14^{h} 12^{m} 53.74538^{s}
- Declination: −10° 16′ 25.3340″
- Apparent magnitude (V): 4.180

Characteristics
- Spectral type: K2/3 III
- U−B color index: +1.457
- B−V color index: +1.343

Astrometry
Radial velocity (R_{v})	−4.38±0.21 km/s
Proper motion (μ)	RA: +7.25 mas/yr Dec.: +139.88 mas/yr
Parallax (π)	12.80±0.25 mas
Distance	255 ± 5 ly (78 ± 2 pc)
Absolute magnitude (M_{V})	−0.28

Details
Mass	1.46±0.04 M_{☉}
Radius	25.41±0.74 R_{☉}
Luminosity	229 L_{☉}
Surface gravity (log g)	1.83±0.08 cgs
Temperature	4,235±20 K
Metallicity [Fe/H]	−0.43±0.04 dex
Rotational velocity (v sin i)	5.1 km/s
Age	9.67±0.97 Gyr

Other designations
- Kang, 98 Virginis, κ Vir, BD−09°3878, FK5 523, HD 124294, HIP 69427, HR 5315, SAO 158427

Database references
SIMBAD	data

Kappa Virginis (κ Virginis, abbreviated Kappa Vir, κ Vir), officially named Kang /ˈkæŋ/, is a solitary star in the zodiac constellation of Virgo. It has an apparent visual magnitude of 4.18, which is sufficiently bright to be seen with the naked eye. Based upon stellar parallax measurements, the distance to this star is about 255 light-years.

== Nomenclature ==
κ Virginis (Latinised to Kappa Virginis) is the star's Bayer designation.

In Chinese, 亢宿 (Kàng Xiù), meaning Neck, refers to an asterism consisting of Kappa Virginis, Iota Virginis, Phi Virginis and Lambda Virginis. Consequently, Kappa Virginis itself is known as 亢宿一 (Kàng Xiù yī), "the First Star of Neck".

In 2016, the IAU organized a Working Group on Star Names (WGSN) to catalog and standardize proper names for stars. The WGSN approved the name Kang for this star on 30 June and it is now so included in the List of IAU-approved Star Names.

== Properties ==
This is an orange-hued K-type giant star with a stellar classification of K2/3 III. It has about 146% of the mass of the Sun, but at an estimated age of 9.7 billion years it has evolved and expanded to over 25 times the Sun's radius. As a consequence, it shines with around 229 times the solar luminosity. The effective temperature of the star's outer atmosphere is 4,235 K.
