= Gamma2 Octantis =

Star in the constellation Octans

γ^{2} Octantis
Observation data Epoch J2000.0 Equinox ICRS
- Constellation: Octans
- Right ascension: 23^{h} 57^{m} 32.8617^{s}
- Declination: −82° 10′ 11.310″
- Apparent magnitude (V): 5.72±0.01

Characteristics
- Evolutionary stage: red clump
- Spectral type: K0 III
- U−B color index: +0.92
- B−V color index: +1.05

Astrometry
Radial velocity (R_{v})	27.2±2.9 km/s
Proper motion (μ)	RA: −22.246 mas/yr Dec.: −23.235 mas/yr
Parallax (π)	10.1771±0.0345 mas
Distance	320 ± 1 ly (98.3 ± 0.3 pc)
Absolute magnitude (M_{V})	+0.87

Details
Mass	1.15±0.15 M_{☉}
Radius	10.54±0.28 R_{☉}
Luminosity	52.6±1.3 L_{☉}
Surface gravity (log g)	2.53±0.13 cgs
Temperature	4,788±58 K
Metallicity [Fe/H]	−0.04±0.04 dex
Rotational velocity (v sin i)	2.8±1.1 km/s

Other designations
- γ^{2} Oct, 87 G. Octantis, CPD−82°907, HD 224362, HIP 118114, HR 9061, SAO 258996

Database references
SIMBAD	data

γ^{2} Octantis, Latinized to Gamma^{2} Octantis (Gamma^{2} Oct), is a solitary star in the southern circumpolar constellation Octans. It has an apparent magnitude of 5.72, allowing it to be faintly seen with the naked eye. Parallax measurements place the object at a distance of 320 light years and is currently receding with a heliocentric radial velocity of 27 km/s.

Gamma^{2} Oct has a stellar classification of K0 III, indicating that it is a red giant. At present it has 115% the mass of the Sun but has expanded to 10.54 times its girth. It shines at 52.6 times the luminosity of the Sun from its enlarged photosphere at an effective temperature of 4,788 K, giving it a yellow-orange glow. Gamma^{2} Oct has a metallicity around 91% that of the Sun and spins with a projected rotational velocity of about 3 km/s.
