= White Tiger (mythology) =

One of Four Symbols of Chinese mythology

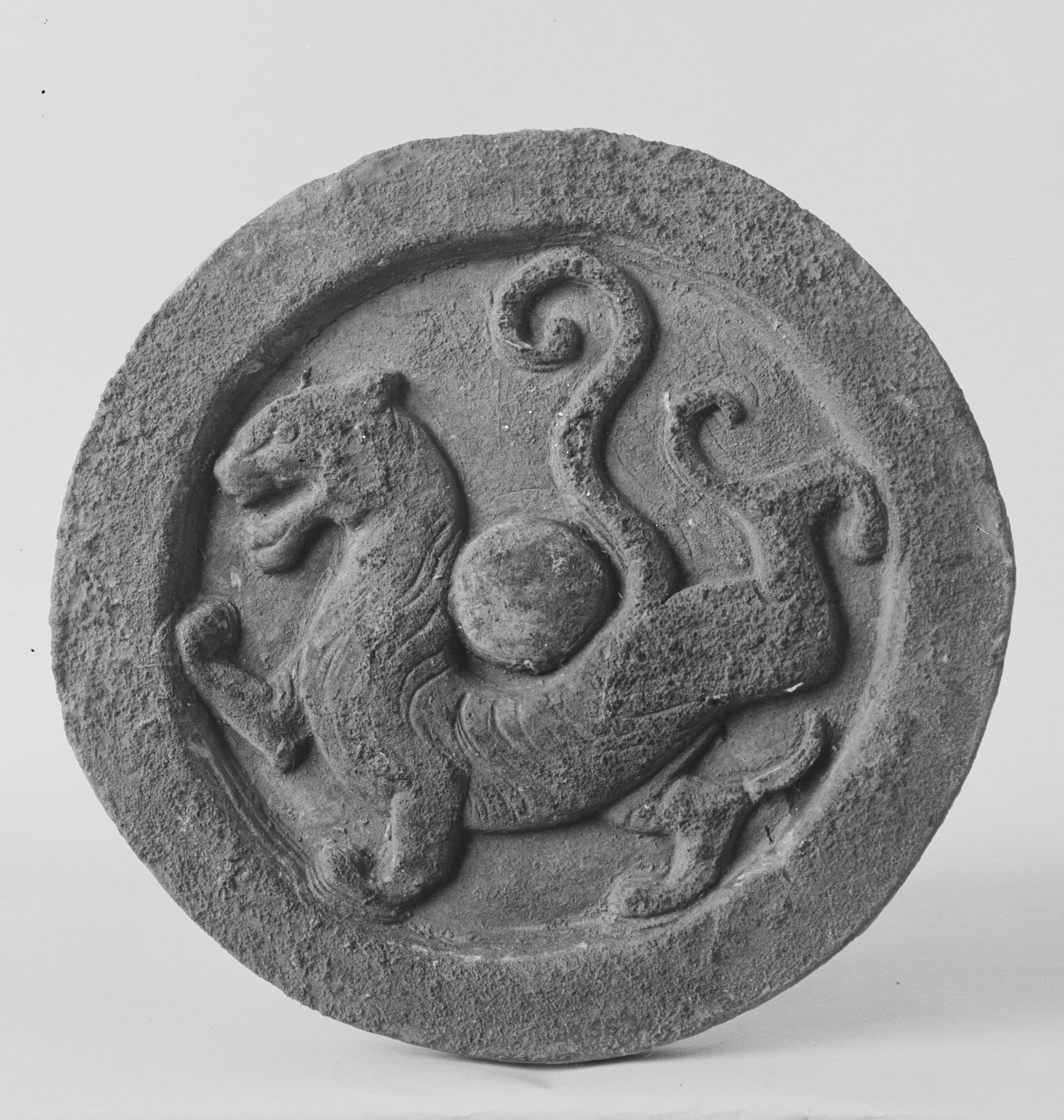
- Bái Hǔ sculpture on an eaves tile

Chinese name
- Chinese: 白虎
Transcriptions
Standard Mandarin
- Hanyu Pinyin: Báihǔ
Yue: Cantonese
- Yale Romanization: Baahk fú
- Jyutping: Baak6 fu2
Southern Min
- Hokkien POJ: Pe̍h-hó͘

Vietnamese name
- Vietnamese alphabet: Bạch Hổ
- Chữ Hán: 白虎

Korean name
- Hangul: 백호
- Hanja: 白虎
Transcriptions
- Revised Romanization: Baekho

Japanese name
- Kanji: 白虎
- Hiragana: びゃっこ
Transcriptions
- Revised Hepburn: Byakko

The White Tiger (Chinese: 白虎; pinyin: Báihǔ), is one of the Four Symbols of the Chinese constellations. It is sometimes called the White Tiger of the West (西方白虎; Xīfāng Báihǔ). It represents the west in terms of direction and the autumn season.

It is known as Byakko in Japanese, Baekho in Korean, and Bạch Hổ in Vietnamese.

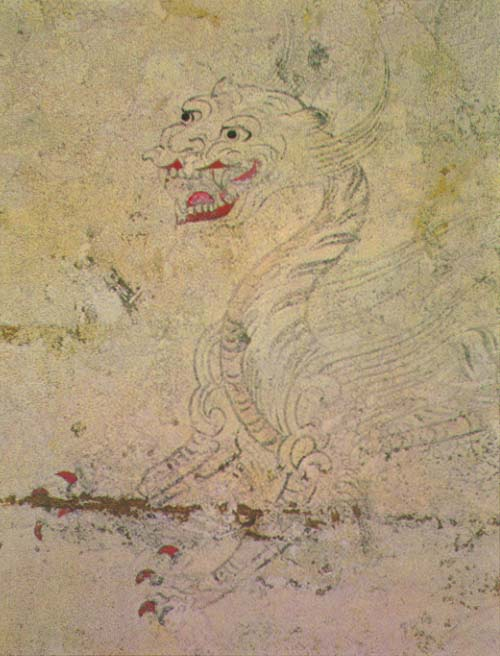

== Seven Mansions ==
As with the other three Symbols, there are seven astrological "Mansions" (positions of the Moon) within the White Tiger. The names and determinative stars are:

| Mansion no. | Name (pinyin) | Translation | Determinative star |
|---|---|---|---|
| 15 | 奎 (Kuí) | Legs | Eta Andromedae |
| 16 | 婁 (Lóu) | Bond | Sheratan |
| 17 | 胃 (Wèi) | Stomach | 35 Arietis |
| 18 | 昴 (Mǎo) | Hairy Head | Alcyone |
| 19 | 畢 (Bì) | Net | Ain |
| 20 | 觜 (Zī) | Turtle Beak | Meissa |
| 21 | 參 (Shēn) | Three Stars | Alnitak |

== See also ==
- Byakkotai
