= Gamma1 Octantis =

Yellow-hued giant star in the constellation Octans

γ^{1} Octantis
- Location of γ^{1} Octantis (circled)

Observation data Epoch J2000 Equinox ICRS
- Constellation: Octans
- Right ascension: 23^{h} 52^{m} 06.47318^{s}
- Declination: −82° 01′ 07.7636″
- Apparent magnitude (V): 5.10

Characteristics
- Evolutionary stage: red clump
- Spectral type: G7III
- U−B color index: +0.60
- B−V color index: +0.92

Astrometry
Radial velocity (R_{v})	+15.4±0.1 km/s
Proper motion (μ)	RA: −45.670 mas/yr Dec.: −15.666 mas/yr
Parallax (π)	12.1790±0.0552 mas
Distance	268 ± 1 ly (82.1 ± 0.4 pc)
Absolute magnitude (M_{V})	0.55

Details
Mass	1.81 M_{☉}
Radius	10.3 R_{☉}
Luminosity	60 L_{☉}
Surface gravity (log g)	2.64 cgs
Temperature	5,017 K
Metallicity [Fe/H]	−0.34 dex
Rotational velocity (v sin i)	1.8 km/s

Other designations
- γ^{1} Oct, 86 G. Octantis, CPD−82°905, FK5 3997, GC 33107, HD 223647, HIP 117689, HR 9032, SAO 258989

Database references
SIMBAD	data

Gamma^{1} Octantis, Latinized from γ^{1} Octantis, is a single, yellow-hued star in the constellation which includes the southern celestial pole, Octans. Its apparent visual magnitude is 5.10, meaning that in good conditions it is bright enough to be faintly visible to the naked eye.

== Distance and proper motion ==
Based upon an annual parallax shift of 12.2 mas which is taken during opposing points of the Earth's orbit of the sun (with compensation for its eccentricity), the star is about 268 light years away. Its (proper) motion has a net vector at present of receding from the Sun, at +15.4 km/s.

== Characteristics ==
This is an evolved G-type giant star with a stellar classification of G7 III. It is a red clump star, which means it is generating energy through helium fusion at its core. The star has an estimated 1.81 times the mass of the Sun and it has expanded to over 10 times the Sun's radius and is radiating 60 times the Sun's luminosity from its enlarged photosphere at an effective temperature of 5,017 K.
