= E Velorum =

The Bayer designations e Velorum and E Velorum are distinct. Due to technical limitations, both designations link here. For the star

- e Velorum, see HD 73634
- E Velorum, see HV Velorum (HD 73340)
