= Twenty-Eight Mansions =

Part of the Chinese constellation system

Chinese name
- Chinese: 二十八宿
Transcriptions
Standard Mandarin
- Hanyu Pinyin: Èrshíbā Xiù
- Bopomofo: ㄦˋ ㄕˊ ㄅㄚ ㄒㄧㄡˋ
- Gwoyeu Romatzyh: elr shyr bah shiow
- Wade–Giles: erh⁴ shih² pa¹ hsü⁴
Hakka
- Romanization: Ngi-sṳ̍p-pat Siuk
Yue: Cantonese
- Yale Romanization: yi saap baat sauk
- Jyutping: ji6 sap6 baat3 sau3
Eastern Min
- Fuzhou BUC: Nê-sĕk-báik Séu

Vietnamese name
- Vietnamese: Nhị thập bát tú
- Chữ Hán: 二十八宿

Korean name
- Hangul: 이십팔수
- Hanja: 二十八宿
Transcriptions
- Revised Romanization: Isippalsu
- McCune–Reischauer: Isipp'alsu

Mongolian name
- Mongolian Cyrillic: хорин найман од
- Mongolian script: ᠬᠣᠷᠢᠨ ᠨᠠᠢ᠍ᠮᠠᠨ ᠣᠳᠣ

Japanese name
- Kanji: 二十八宿
- Hiragana: にじゅうはっしゅく
- Katakana: ニジュウハッシュク
Transcriptions
- Romanization: Nijū Hasshuku

Manchu name
- Manchu script: ᠣᡵᡳᠨ ᠵᠠᡴᡡᠨ ᡨᠣᡴᡩᠣᠨ
- Möllendorff: orin jakūn tokdon

The twenty-eight mansions of the Chinese astronomy (specular reflection, north at the top, east is on the left)

The Twenty-Eight Mansions (Chinese: 二十八宿; pinyin: Èrshíbā Xiù), also called xiu or hsiu, are part of the Chinese constellations system. They can be considered as the equivalent to the zodiacal constellations in Western astronomy, though the Twenty-eight Mansions reflect the movement of the Moon through a sidereal month rather than the Sun in a tropical year. Each mansion is roughly a day of the month.

The lunar mansion system was in use in other parts of East Asia, such as ancient Japan; the Bansenshūkai, written by Fujibayashi Yasutake, mentions the system several times and includes an image of the twenty-eight mansions.

A similar system, called nakshatra, is used in traditional Indian astronomy.

== Overview ==
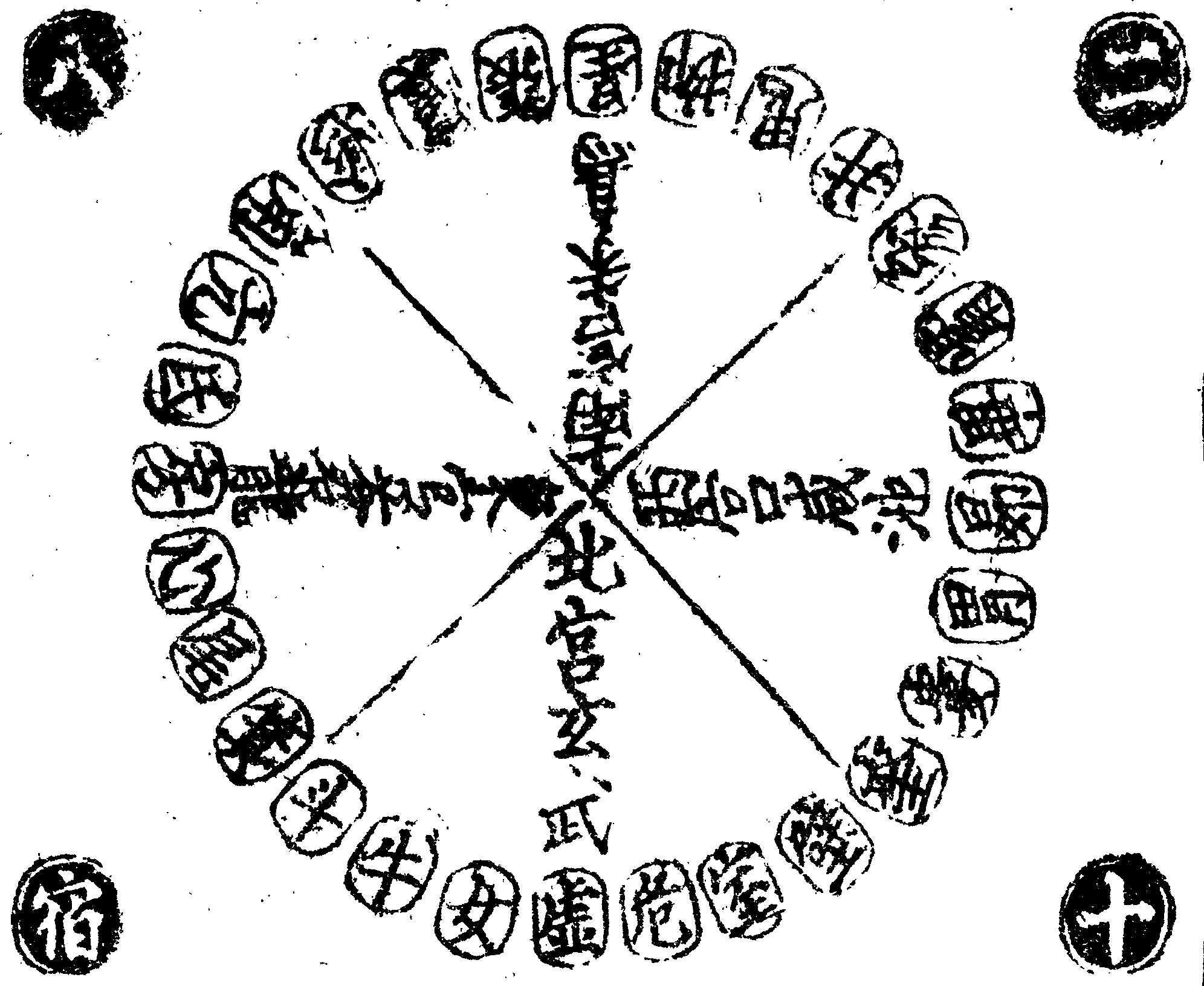
Yuan dynasty illustration of the 28 mansions from Shilin Guangji by Chen Yuanjing

Ancient Chinese astronomers divided the sky ecliptic into four regions, collectively known as the Four Symbols, each assigned a mysterious animal. They are Azure Dragon (青龍) on the east, Black Tortoise (玄武) on the north, White Tiger (白虎) on the west, and Vermilion Bird (朱雀) on the south. Each region contains seven mansions, making a total of 28 mansions. These mansions or xiù correspond to the longitudes along the ecliptic that the Moon crosses during its 27.32-day journey around the Earth and serve as a way to track the Moon's progress. In Taoism they are related to 28 Chinese generals.

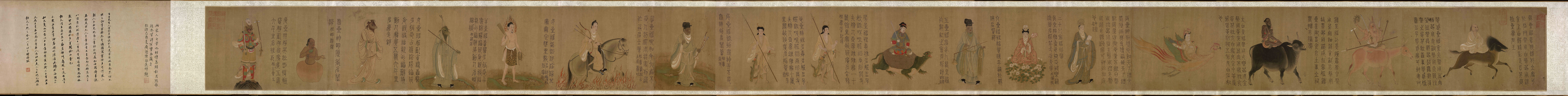
Late Sui to early Tang dynasty portrayal of the Five Stars and Twenty-Eight Mansions, by Liang Lingzan (梁令瓒), .

== List of mansions ==
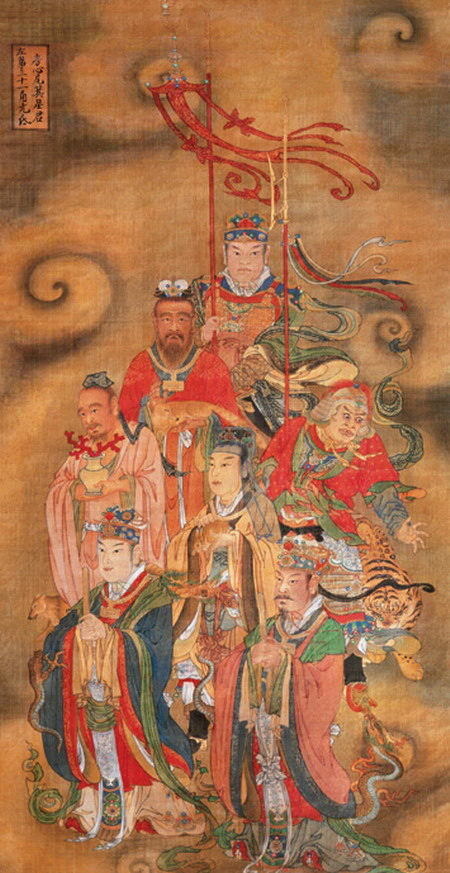
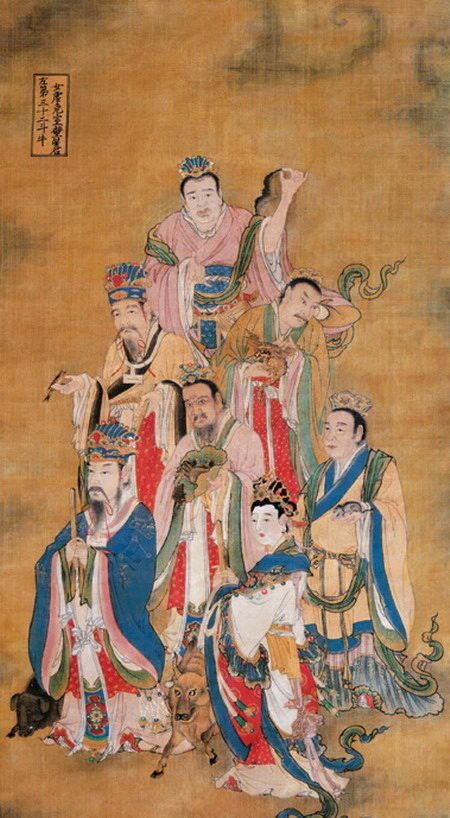
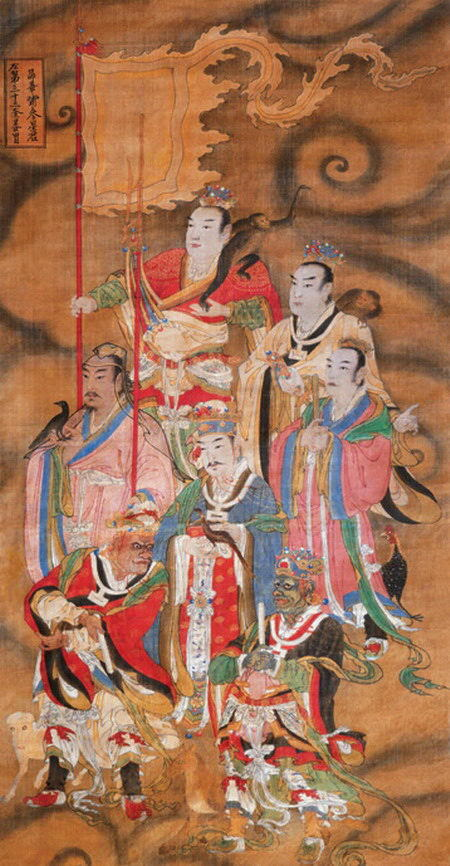
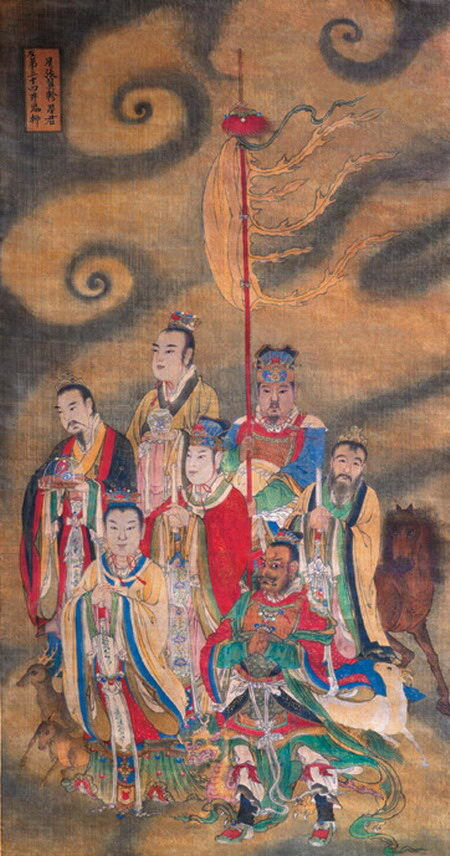
Ming Dynasty Shuilu ritual paintings of the mansions from Baoning Temple. (clockwise: Azure Dragon, Black Tortoise, White Tiger, Vermillion Bird)

The names and determinative stars of the mansions are:

Four Symbols (四象)	Mansion (宿)			
Four Symbols (四象)	Number	Name (Pinyin)	Translation	Determinative star
Azure Dragon of the East (東方青龍 - Dōngfāng Qīnglóng); Spring	1	角 (Jiǎo)	Horn	α Vir
Azure Dragon of the East (東方青龍 - Dōngfāng Qīnglóng); Spring	2	亢 (Kàng)	Neck	κ Vir
Azure Dragon of the East (東方青龍 - Dōngfāng Qīnglóng); Spring	3	氐 (Dī)	Root	α Lib
Azure Dragon of the East (東方青龍 - Dōngfāng Qīnglóng); Spring	4	房 (Fáng)	Room	π Sco
Azure Dragon of the East (東方青龍 - Dōngfāng Qīnglóng); Spring	5	心 (Xīn)	Heart	α Sco
Azure Dragon of the East (東方青龍 - Dōngfāng Qīnglóng); Spring	6	尾 (Wěi)	Tail	μ¹ Sco
Azure Dragon of the East (東方青龍 - Dōngfāng Qīnglóng); Spring	7	箕 (Jī)	Winnowing Basket	γ Sgr
Black Tortoise of the North (北方玄武 - Běifāng Xuánwǔ); Winter	8	斗 (Dǒu)	(Southern) Dipper	φ Sgr
Black Tortoise of the North (北方玄武 - Běifāng Xuánwǔ); Winter	9	牛 (Niú)	Ox	β Cap
Black Tortoise of the North (北方玄武 - Běifāng Xuánwǔ); Winter	10	女 (Nǚ)	Girl	ε Aqr
Black Tortoise of the North (北方玄武 - Běifāng Xuánwǔ); Winter	11	虛 (Xū)	Emptiness	β Aqr
Black Tortoise of the North (北方玄武 - Běifāng Xuánwǔ); Winter	12	危 (Wēi)	Rooftop	α Aqr
Black Tortoise of the North (北方玄武 - Běifāng Xuánwǔ); Winter	13	室 (Shì)	Encampment	α Peg
Black Tortoise of the North (北方玄武 - Běifāng Xuánwǔ); Winter	14	壁 (Bì)	Wall	γ Peg
White Tiger of the West (西方白虎 - Xīfāng Báihǔ); Fall	15	奎 (Kuí)	Legs	η And
White Tiger of the West (西方白虎 - Xīfāng Báihǔ); Fall	16	婁 (Lóu)	Bond	β Ari
White Tiger of the West (西方白虎 - Xīfāng Báihǔ); Fall	17	胃 (Wèi)	Stomach	35 Ari
White Tiger of the West (西方白虎 - Xīfāng Báihǔ); Fall	18	昴 (Mǎo)	Hairy Head	17 Tau
White Tiger of the West (西方白虎 - Xīfāng Báihǔ); Fall	19	畢 (Bì)	Net	ε Tau
White Tiger of the West (西方白虎 - Xīfāng Báihǔ); Fall	20	觜 (Zī)	Turtle Beak	λ Ori
White Tiger of the West (西方白虎 - Xīfāng Báihǔ); Fall	21	参 (Shēn)	Three Stars	ζ Ori
Vermilion Bird of the South (南方朱雀 - Nánfāng Zhūquè); Summer	22	井 (Jǐng)	Well	μ Gem
Vermilion Bird of the South (南方朱雀 - Nánfāng Zhūquè); Summer	23	鬼 (Guǐ)	Ghost	θ Cnc
Vermilion Bird of the South (南方朱雀 - Nánfāng Zhūquè); Summer	24	柳 (Liǔ)	Willow	δ Hya
Vermilion Bird of the South (南方朱雀 - Nánfāng Zhūquè); Summer	25	星 (Xīng)	Star	α Hya
Vermilion Bird of the South (南方朱雀 - Nánfāng Zhūquè); Summer	26	張 (Zhāng)	Extended Net	υ¹ Hya
Vermilion Bird of the South (南方朱雀 - Nánfāng Zhūquè); Summer	27	翼 (Yì)	Wings	α Crt
Vermilion Bird of the South (南方朱雀 - Nánfāng Zhūquè); Summer	28	軫 (Zhěn)	Chariot	γ Crv
Yellow Dragon of the Center (黃龍 - Huánglóng)	—	轩辕 (Xuanyuan)	Body	α Leo

The Twenty-Eight Mansions are matched with Day of the week and animal to calculate a person's fortune and luck.

Direction		Thursday	Friday	Saturday	Sunday	Monday	Tuesday	Wednesday
Direction		Wood	Metal / Gold	Earth / Soil	Yang	Yin	Fire	Water
East	Constellation	Horn	Neck	Root	Room	Heart	Tail	Winnowing Basket
East	Animal	Jiaolong	Dragon	Raccoon dog	Rabbit	Fox	Tiger	Leopard
North	Constellation	Dipper	Ox	Girl	Emptiness	Roof	Encampment	Wall
North	Animal	Xiezhi	Bovini	Bat	Muroidea	Swallow	Sus	Yayu
West	Constellation	Legs	Bond	Stomach	Hairy Head	Net	Turtle Beak	Three Stars
West	Animal	Wolf	Dog	Phasianidae	Chicken	Corvus	Monkey	Ape
South	Constellation	Well	Ghost	Willow	Star	Extended Net	Wings	Chariot
South	Animal	Bian	Caprinae	Water deer	Horse	Deer	Snake	Earthworm

== See also ==
- Four Symbols (Chinese constellation)
- Lunar mansion
- Three enclosures
