= Neck (Chinese constellation) =

The Neck mansion (亢宿, pinyin: Kàng Sù) is one of the Twenty-eight mansions of the Chinese constellations. It is one of the eastern mansions of the Azure Dragon.

In Chinese Cosmology, the Kang Constellation is associated with the Kidney Organ. 亢 is a picture of a person standing with their legs open, as in horse stance, and so holds the quality of strength that comes through a proper foundation. This matches up with Chapter 8 of the Suwen, which says that the Kidney is in charge of strength and fortification. The Kidney houses the Zhi, which is in charge of solid grounding in one's life purpose. Kang is also the neck or throat of the Azure Dragon of the East, which, while the throat area is ruled by the Lung, has everything to do with sound—pointing to the Kidney's orifice of the ears. Around the 5th Century BC, it is believed that eclipses would take place in this constellation. This coming together of the Sun and the moon works as a symbol that points towards the ShaoYin relationship of the Kidney and Heart.

== Asterisms ==
English name	Chinese name	European constellation	Number of stars	Representing
Neck	亢	Virgo	4	Azure Dragon's neck
Great Horn	大角	Boötes	1	Azure Dragon's horn or national imperial throne
Left Conductor	左攝提	Boötes	6	Seasonal officials in the left
Right Conductor	右攝提	Boötes	6	Seasonal officials in the right
Trials	頓頑	Lupus	2	Trial or prison officials
Gate of Yang	陽門	Centaurus	2	Frontier's gate
Executions	折威	Libra/Hydra	7	Officials in the execution or enforcement of the death penalty
