= Ghost (Chinese constellation) =

Mansion of the Chinese constellations

The Ghost mansion (Chinese: 鬼宿; pinyin: Guǐ Xiù) is one of the Twenty-eight mansions of the Chinese constellations. It is one of the southern mansions of the Vermilion Bird.

== Asterisms ==
English name	Chinese name	European constellation	Number of stars
Ghost	鬼	Cancer	3
Cumulative Corpses	積尸	Cancer	1
Beacon Fire	爟	Cancer	4
Celestial Dog	天狗	Pyxis/Vela	7
Outer Kitchen	外廚	Hydra	6
Celestial Earth God's Temple	天社	Vela	6
Judge for Estimating the Age of Animals	天記	Vela	1
