= List of stars in Pyxis =

This is the list of notable stars in the constellation Pyxis, sorted by decreasing brightness.

Name	B	Var	HD	HIP	RA	Dec	vis. mag.	abs. mag.	Dist. (ly)	Sp. class	Notes
α Pyx	α		74575	42828	08^{h} 43^{m} 35.55^{s}	−33° 11′ 11.1″	3.68	−3.39	845	B1.5III	β Cep variable, V_{max} = 3.67^{m}, V_{min} = 3.70^{m}
β Pyx	β		74006	42515	08^{h} 40^{m} 06.14^{s}	−35° 18′ 29.9″	3.97	−1.41	388	G5II/III	
γ Pyx	γ		75691	43409	08^{h} 50^{m} 32.01^{s}	−27° 42′ 36.2″	4.02	−0.01	209	K3III	
κ Pyx	κ		78541	44824	09^{h} 08^{m} 02.86^{s}	−25° 51′ 30.7″	4.62	−1.25	487	K4/K5III	variable star, ΔV = 0.006^{m}, P = 8.50919 d
θ Pyx	θ		80874	45902	09^{h} 21^{m} 29.60^{s}	−25° 57′ 55.5″	4.71	−1.31	522	M0III	semiregular variable
λ Pyx	λ		81169	46026	09^{h} 23^{m} 12.34^{s}	−28° 50′ 02.1″	4.71	0.98	182	G8III	
ζ Pyx	ζ		73898	42483	08^{h} 39^{m} 42.49^{s}	−29° 33′ 39.1″	4.86	0.56	236	G5III	
δ Pyx	δ		76483	43825	08^{h} 55^{m} 31.52^{s}	−27° 40′ 53.9″	4.87	0.66	226	A3IV	
HD 73752			73752	42430	08^{h} 39^{m} 08.07^{s}	−22° 39′ 46.5″	5.05	3.55	65	G3/G5V	
HD 75605			75605	43352	08^{h} 49^{m} 51.50^{s}	−32° 46′ 49.5″	5.19	0.96	229	G8III	
η Pyx	η		73495	42334	08^{h} 37^{m} 52.17^{s}	−26° 15′ 17.9″	5.24	0.89	242	A0V	suspected variable
HD 72310			72310	41817	08^{h} 31^{m} 30.94^{s}	−19° 34′ 38.8″	5.42	0.08	381	B9.5IV/V	
ε Pyx	ε		78922	45001	09^{h} 09^{m} 56.41^{s}	−30° 21′ 55.0″	5.59	1.52	212	A4IV	variable star, ΔV = 0.006^{m}, P = 6.15574 d
HD 72227			72227	41723	08^{h} 30^{m} 28.62^{s}	−32° 09′ 33.4″	5.61	−2.21	1194	K3III	
HD 74824			74824	42923	08^{h} 44^{m} 51.93^{s}	−37° 08′ 50.1″	5.74	−2.47	1430	B2III	variable star, ΔV = 0.013^{m}, P = 2.72703 d
XY Pyx		XY	71801	41515	08^{h} 27^{m} 59.43^{s}	−35° 06′ 49.6″	5.75	−1.68	1000	B2V	β Lyr variable
HD 75629			75629	43370	08^{h} 50^{m} 02.24^{s}	−29° 27′ 46.8″	5.86	−1.44	939	G8III	
HD 73072			73072	42147	08^{h} 35^{m} 28.72^{s}	−26° 50′ 36.7″	5.95	−1.10	838	A1V+...	
HD 74879			74879	43002	08^{h} 45^{m} 49.30^{s}	−25° 23′ 17.2″	6.07	0.87	357	A3IV/V	
HD 74706			74706	42928	08^{h} 44^{m} 55.16^{s}	−21° 10′ 04.2″	6.10	1.63	255	A5V	
HD 73900			73900	42455	08^{h} 39^{m} 22.21^{s}	−36° 36′ 24.5″	6.12	3.10	131	F3/F5V	
HD 81753			81753	46329	09^{h} 26^{m} 44.91^{s}	−28° 47′ 15.7″	6.12	−2.32	1590	B5V	variable star, ΔV = 0.010^{m}, P = 1.23490 d
HD 78676			78676	44887	09^{h} 08^{m} 43.56^{s}	−26° 46′ 03.5″	6.15	0.86	373	A4IV	
HD 75649			75649	43394	08^{h} 50^{m} 21.65^{s}	−28° 37′ 03.4″	6.17	0.91	368	B9V	
HD 72626			72626	41949	08^{h} 33^{m} 04.85^{s}	−24° 36′ 24.8″	6.19	1.72	255	F2IV/V	
HD 77361			77361	44290	09^{h} 01^{m} 11.40^{s}	−26° 39′ 48.9″	6.20	0.81	389	K1IIICN...	
HD 77087			77087	44130	08^{h} 59^{m} 15.85^{s}	−28° 48′ 21.9″	6.24	0.44	472	G8III	
HD 73603			73603	42394	08^{h} 38^{m} 40.29^{s}	−19° 44′ 12.9″	6.32	−0.90	906	M1III	suspected variable
HD 71622			71622	41449	08^{h} 27^{m} 16.43^{s}	−31° 40′ 21.8″	6.33	−0.28	685	G8III	
AI Pyx		AI	75112	43114	08^{h} 46^{m} 49.25^{s}	−34° 37′ 22.7″	6.33	−0.86	896	B3V	irregular variable
VX Pyx		VX	72688	41939	08^{h} 32^{m} 58.51^{s}	−34° 38′ 02.6″	6.36	0.78	426	G8III	RS CVn variable, V_{max} = 6.32^{m}, V_{min} = 6.42^{m}
HD 72673			72673	41926	08^{h} 32^{m} 52.26^{s}	−31° 30′ 09.7″	6.38	5.95	40	K0V	
HD 79456			79456	45249	09^{h} 13^{m} 21.53^{s}	−29° 39′ 51.9″	6.38	−0.98	964	K5III	
HD 76512			76512	43853	08^{h} 55^{m} 55.93^{s}	−23° 49′ 06.3″	6.39	2.16	229	A4V	
HD 72913			72913	42071	08^{h} 34^{m} 29.73^{s}	−27° 05′ 53.5″	6.40	−1.11	1035	K3III	variable star, ΔV = 0.006^{m}, P = 7.67872 d
HD 80590			80590	45754	09^{h} 19^{m} 47.94^{s}	−34° 06′ 11.9″	6.40	−0.20	681	B8V	
HD 72954			72954	42075	08^{h} 34^{m} 31.95^{s}	−32° 35′ 54.2″	6.41	2.42	205	G5V	
HD 76072			76072	43590	08^{h} 52^{m} 38.70^{s}	−36° 32′ 43.2″	6.41	−1.15	1062	G8III+...	suspected variable, ΔV = 0.15^{m}
HD 74475			74475	42775	08^{h} 42^{m} 57.01^{s}	−35° 56′ 36.1″	6.42	0.77	439	A0V	
AK Pyx		AK	75306	43215	08^{h} 48^{m} 14.63^{s}	−28° 38′ 19.6″	6.42	−0.45	771	M5III	semiregular variable
HD 75495			75495	43338	08^{h} 49^{m} 44.94^{s}	−21° 02′ 53.9″	6.48	1.96	261	A6IV	
HD 76001			76001	43573	08^{h} 52^{m} 26.14^{s}	−32° 30′ 33.5″	6.49	−0.48	807	K2/K3III	
HD 71815			71815	41572	08^{h} 28^{m} 36.06^{s}	−23° 04′ 15.5″	6.50	0.49	519	A1/A2V	
TY Pyx		TY	77137	44164	08^{h} 59^{m} 42.72^{s}	−27° 48′ 58.7″	6.87		183.9	G5IV+G5IV	RS CVn variable, V_{max} = 6.85^{m}, V_{min} = 7.5^{m}, P = 3.1985787 d
HD 73256		CS	73256	42214	08^{h} 36^{m} 23.02^{s}	−30° 02′ 15.5″	8.08	5.27	119	G9V	BY Dra variable, ΔV = 0.03^{m}, P = 13.97 d; has a planet (b)
HD 77338			77338	44291	09^{h} 01^{m} 00.0^{s}	−24° 28′ 23″	8.63		133	K0V	has a planet (b)
HD 73267			73267	42202	08^{h} 36^{m} 17.78^{s}	−34° 27′ 35.9″	8.90	5.20	179	G5V	has a planet (b)
RZ Pyx		RZ	75920	43541	08^{h} 52^{m} 04.40^{s}	−27° 29′ 01.5″	9.17		1220	B7V	β Lyr variable
R Pyx		R		42975	08^{h} 45^{m} 30.70^{s}	−28° 12′ 02.8″	10.40		1860	C	Mira variable, V_{max} = 7.8^{m}, V_{min} = 12.0^{m}, P = 364.7 d
XX Pyx		XX			08^{h} 58^{m} 39.04^{s}	−24° 35′ 10.6″	11.49			A4V	δ Sct and rotating ellipsoidal variable
Gliese 317					08^{h} 40^{m} 59.21^{s}	−23° 27′ 22.6″	11.98		49.9	M3.5	has a planet (b) and an unconfirmed planet (c)
WASP-170					09^{h} 01^{m} 39.9^{s}	−20° 43′ 14″	12.79			G1	has a transiting planet (b)
T Pyx		T			09^{h} 04^{m} 41.50^{s}	−32° 22′ 47.5″	15.5				recurrent nova, V_{max} = 6.2^{m}, V_{min} = 15.5^{m}, P = 0.07622886 d
VZ Pyx		VZ			08^{h} 59^{m} 19.84^{s}	−24° 28′ 55.4″	16.8				SU UMa variable, V_{max} = 11.8^{m}, V_{min} = 16.8^{m}, P = 0.07332 d
Table legend: • Name = Proper name • B = Bayer designation • F or/and G. = Flamsteed designation or Gould designation • Var = Variable star designation • HD = Henry Draper Catalogue designation number • HIP = Hipparcos Catalogue designation number • RA = Right ascension for the Epoch/Equinox J2000.0 • Dec = Declination for the Epoch/Equinox J2000.0 • vis. mag. = visual magnitude (m or m_{v}), also known as apparent magnitude • abs. mag. = absolute magnitude (M_{v}) • Dist. (ly) = Distance in light-years from Earth • Sp. class = Spectral class of the star in the stellar classification system • Notes = Common name(s) or alternate name(s); comments; notable properties [for example: multiple star status, range of variability if it is a variable star, exoplanets, etc.]

== See also ==
- Lists of stars by constellation
