= Pyxis (disambiguation) =

Pyxis is a constellation in the Southern Hemisphere.

Pyxis may also refer to:

- Pyxis (vessel), a piece of ancient Greek pottery
- Pyxis (turtle), a turtle genus
- Pyxis, a type of capsular fruit where the upper part falls off
- Pyxis (idol unit), a Japanese idol duo consisting of Miku Itō and Moe Toyota
- Pyxis Corporation, a manufacturer of medical technologies and automated dispensing cabinet (ADC) for medications
- Sony Pyxis, an early GPS navigation device launched in 1991

== See also ==
- η Pyxidis, a star
