= NGC 2663 =

Galaxy in the constellation Pyxis

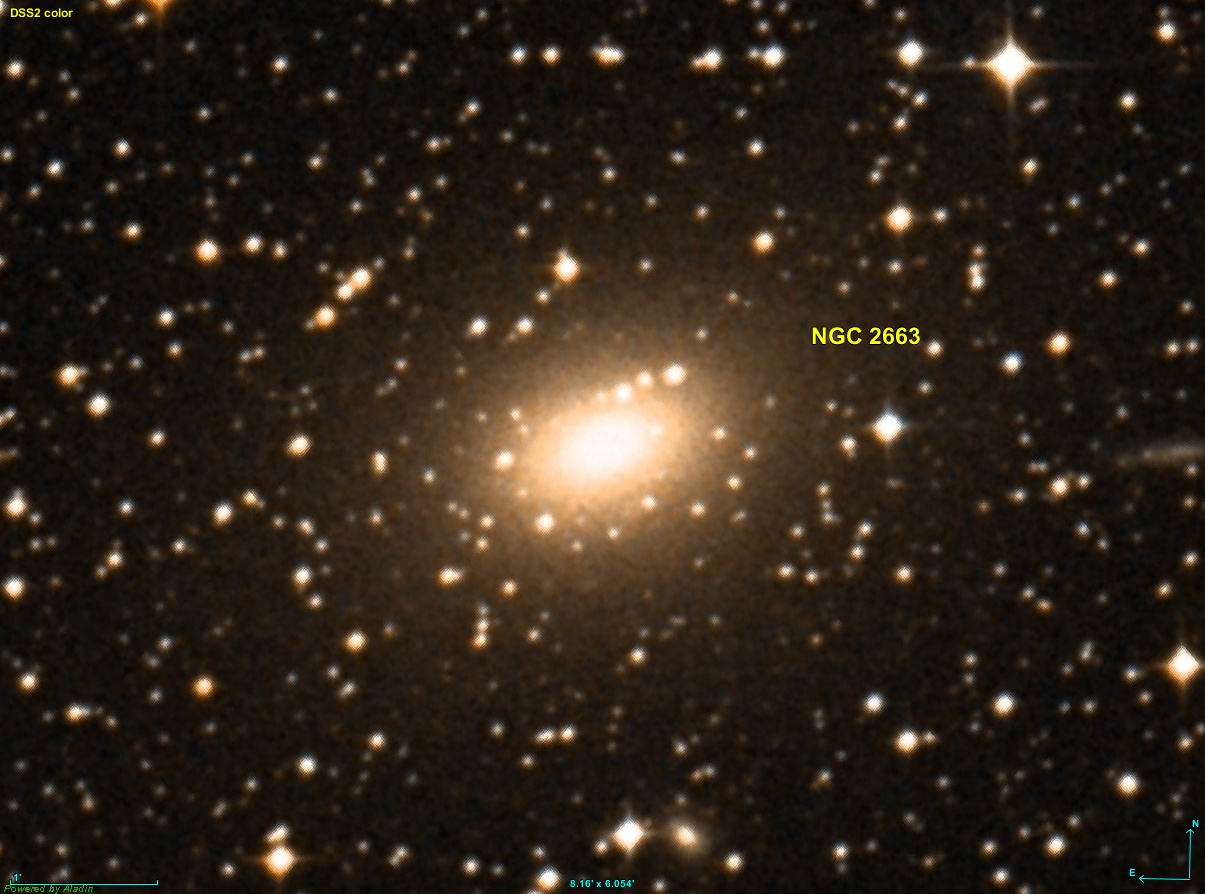

Observation data (J2000.0 epoch)
- Constellation: Pyxis
- Right ascension: 08^{h} 45^{m} 08.144^{s}
- Declination: −33° 47′ 41.06″
- Redshift: 0.007078
- Heliocentric radial velocity: 2114 km/s
- Distance: 93 mly
- Apparent magnitude (V): 12.33
- Apparent magnitude (B): 11.85

Characteristics
- Type: E
- Apparent size (V): 3.72′ × 2.51′

Other designations
- NGC 2663, MGPS J084507-33474, PKS 0843-336, HDC 494 J084508.24-3347411, ESO 371-14, MOST 0843-336, PKS J0845-3347, LDC 585 J084508.24-3347411, ESO-LV 371-0140, MRC 0843-336, PKS 0843-33 F. Galaxy 157 LEDA 24590, MSH 08-3-08 QSO B0843-336, 80, 2MASX J08450824-3347411, NVSS J084508-334736 F, SGC 084308-3336.7, MCG-06-20-001, OHIO J -372, VLSS J0845.1-3347

NGC 2663 (also known as PGC 24590) is an elliptical galaxy with a gaseous disk located in the constellation Pyxis. It is 93 million light years away from Earth. It hosts a compact central radio source and previous studies suggested that it also contains an active galactic nucleus (AGN). Although it was detected in 1886 and many observations of this galaxy have been conducted since then, many of its properties still remain unknown.

== Discovery ==
The galaxy was discovered on 8 February 1886 by Lewis A. Swift.

== Black hole ==
In August 2022, astronomers from the Western Sydney University discovered a black hole shooting a jet at almost the speed of light, with enormous energy. The beam length is expected to be spanning more than a million light years from end to end. The jet of matter was shooting out of NGC 2663 from a black hole at its center. The jet stream was about 50 times larger than the galaxy itself. At the time of discovery it was one of the biggest jets ever observed. The astronomers used the Commonwealth Scientific and Industrial Research Organisation's (CSIRO) super-telescope the Australian Square Kilometer Array Pathfinder, which is a network of 36 linked radio dishes combined to form a single super telescope.

== See also ==
- List of galaxies
