= NGC 2559 =

Galaxy in the constellation Puppis

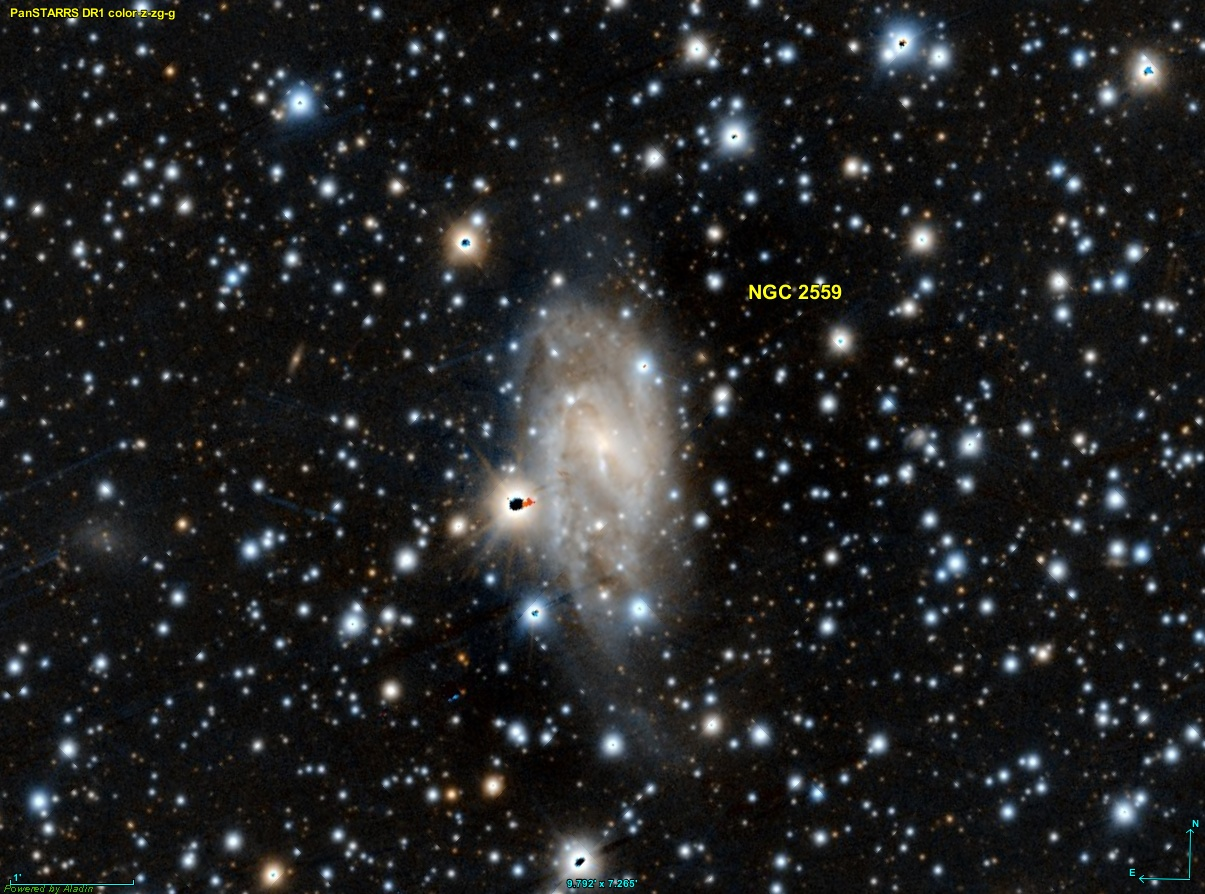
- NGC 2559 by PanSTARRS

Observation data (J2000 epoch)
- Constellation: Puppis
- Right ascension: 08^{h} 17^{m} 06.1^{s}
- Declination: −27° 27′ 20″
- Redshift: 0.005200 ± 0.000017
- Heliocentric radial velocity: 1,559 ± 5 km/s
- Distance: 58.1 ± 5.0 Mly (17.8 ± 1.5 Mpc)
- Apparent magnitude (V): 10.9

Characteristics
- Type: SB(s)bc pec
- Apparent size (V): 4.13′ × 2.07′

Other designations
- UGCA 136, ESO 494-41, MCG -04-20-003, VV 475, IRAS 08150-2718, PGC 23222

NGC 2559 is a barred spiral galaxy in the constellation Puppis. The galaxy lies about 60 million light years away from Earth based on redshift independent methods, which means, given its apparent dimensions, that NGC 2559 is approximately 90,000 light years across. It was discovered by John Herschel on February 5, 1837.

== Characteristics ==
The galaxy has a bar and a small elliptical bulge, which is obstructed by large amounts of dust. From the end of the bar emerge two spiral arms with several knots and twists. The east arm has more bright knots than the west one. The position angle of the galaxy is variable, which is centrally at a north-south axis and rotates to northeast-southwest peripherally. The outer arms of the galaxy are faint. The galaxy extends to 6.6 arcminutes when its fainter extremities are considered, which corresponds to 110,000 light years. In the centre of the galaxy lies a supermassive black hole, whose mass is estimated to be 10^{6.64 ± 0.97} (0.5 - 37 million) M_{☉}, based on the pitch angle of the spiral arms. The star formation rate of the galaxy is estimated to be 3 M_{☉} per year.

== Supernova ==
One supernova has been observed in NGC 2559, SN 2002hc. The supernova was detected by Katzman Automatic Imaging Telescope on 24 October 2002, at an apparent magnitude of 17. The spectrum showed it was a Type II supernova.

== Nearby galaxies ==
NGC 2559 is the foremost galaxy in the NGC 2559 group, which also includes NGC 2566, and IC 2311. There is a possible companion galaxy to NGC 2559 4 arcminutes to the east. The group is noted for containing many hydrogen deficient galaxies. Other nearby galaxies include NGC 2613 and ESO 563-13. It is part of the Puppis Wall, which connects the Antlia Cluster with the Fornax Cluster.
