= NGC 2627 =

Open cluster in the constellation Pyxis

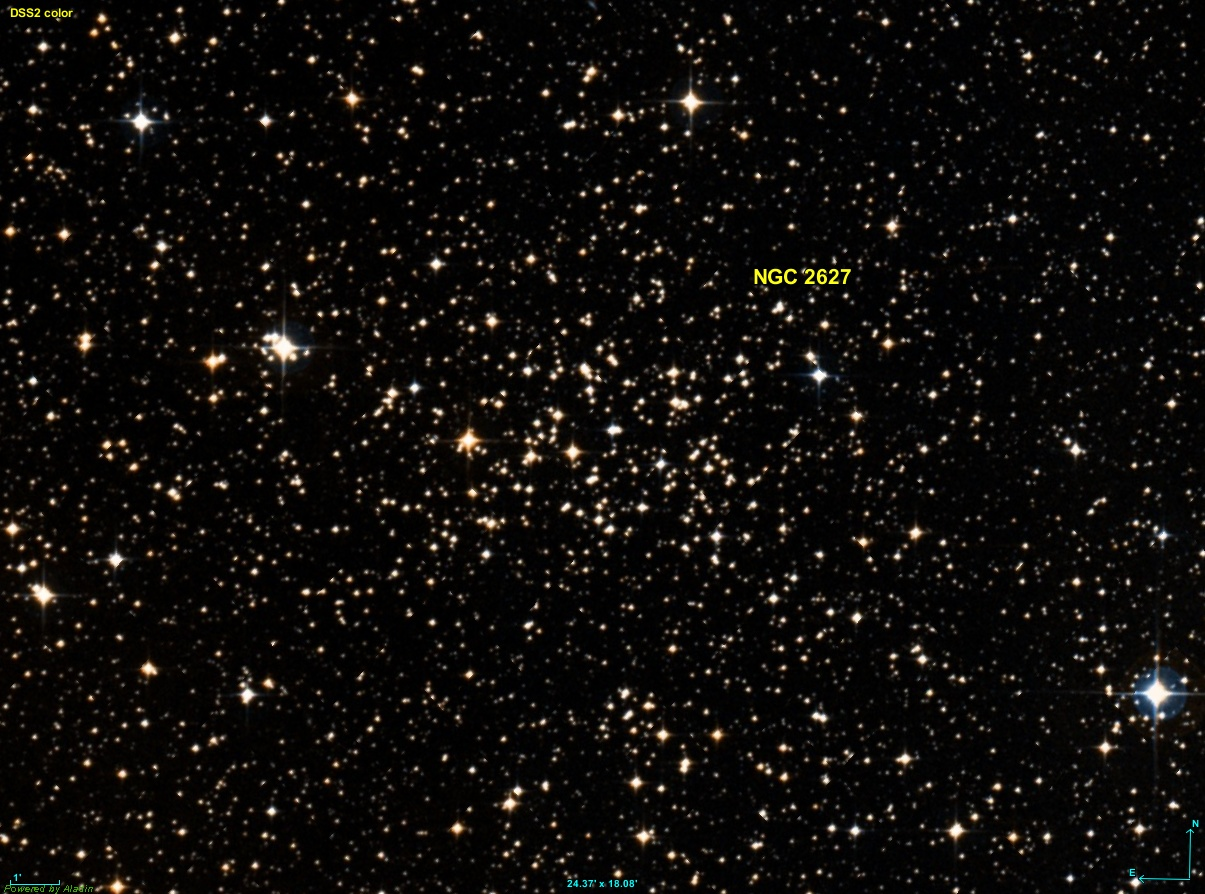

Observation data (J2000.0 epoch)
- Right ascension: 08^{h} 37^{m} 14.2^{s}
- Declination: −29° 57′ 07″
- Distance: 5,990 ly (1,837 pc)
- Apparent magnitude (V): 8.4
- Apparent dimensions (V): 11.0′

Physical characteristics
- Other designations: NGC 2627, Cr 188, Mel 87

Associations
- Constellation: Pyxis

NGC 2627 is an open cluster of stars in the constellation Pyxis. It was discovered on March 3, 1793 by German-British astronomer William Herschel. Dutch astronomer J. L. E. Dreyer described it as "a cluster, considerably large, pretty rich, pretty compressed, stars from 11th to 13th magnitude". The cluster has an integrated visual magnitude of 8.4 and it spans an angular size of 11.0′. Around 15 stars are visible when viewed through binoculars. NGC 2627 is located at a distance of approximately 5,990 ly (1,837 pc) from the Sun, just above the galactic midplane.

This cluster has a Trumpler class of III 2m, which means it is generally average in appearance with no noticeable concentration of stars. It is of intermediate age, being around 1.4 billion years old. Correspondingly, the metallicity of the cluster is slightly sub-solar. The cluster population shows four different peaks of star formation, separated by relatively quiescent periods lasting two to three hundred million years.
