= HD 77361 =

Star in the constellation Pyxis

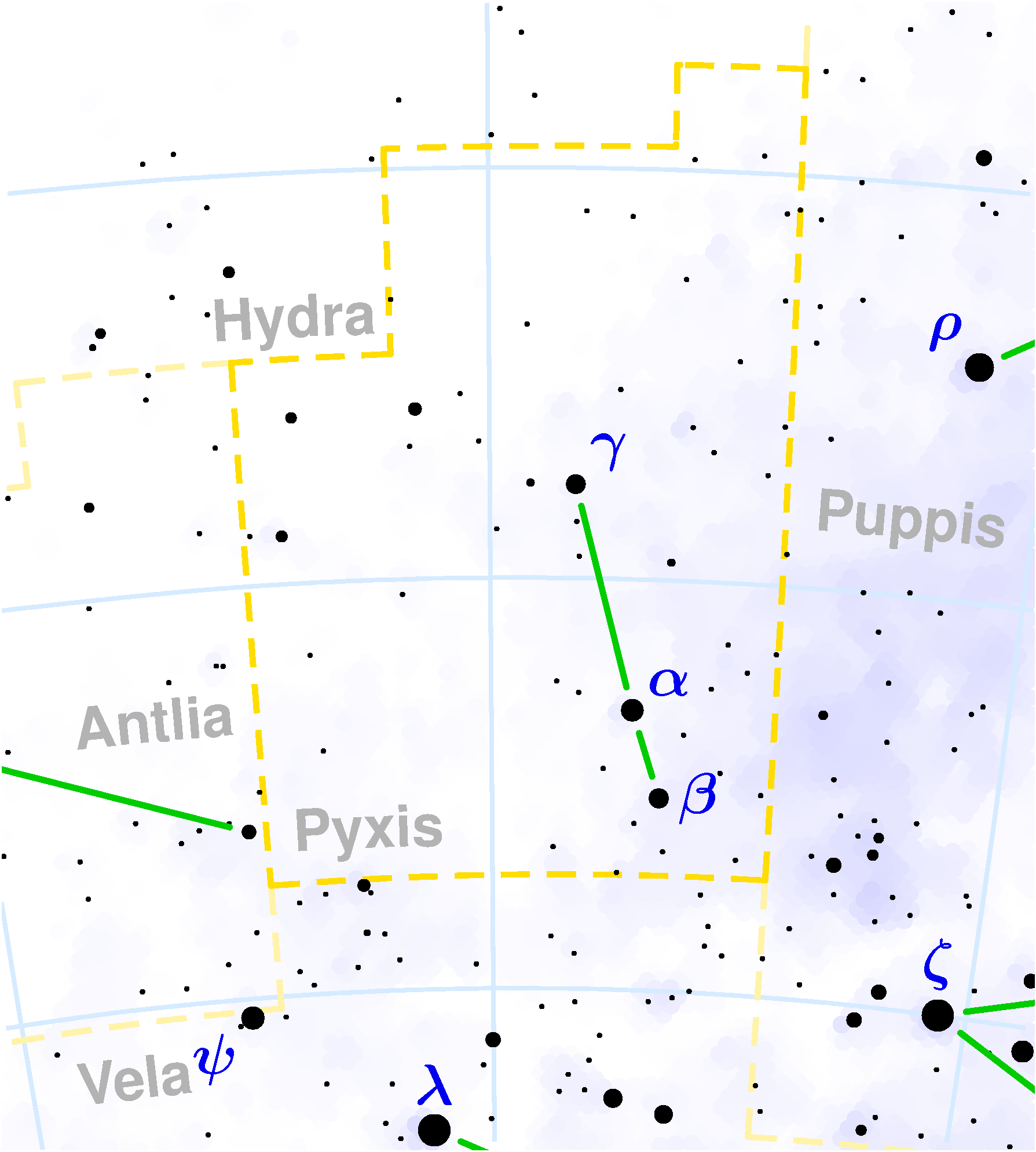
- Location of HD 77361 (circled)

Observation data Epoch J2000.0 Equinox ICRS
- Constellation: Pyxis
- Right ascension: 09^{h} 01^{m} 11.41956^{s}
- Declination: −26° 39′ 49.3773″
- Apparent magnitude (V): 6.187

Characteristics
- Evolutionary stage: RGB
- Spectral type: K1IIICNII
- U−B color index: 1.18±0.05
- B−V color index: 1.165
- J−H color index: 0.690
- J−K color index: 0.749

Astrometry
Radial velocity (R_{v})	−23.17±0.12 km/s
Proper motion (μ)	RA: 25.441 mas/yr Dec.: −53.283 mas/yr
Parallax (π)	7.5091±0.0242 mas
Distance	434 ± 1 ly (133.2 ± 0.4 pc)

Details
Mass	1.78 M_{☉}
Luminosity	74.1+3.5 −3.3 L_{☉}
Surface gravity (log g)	2.35 cgs
Temperature	4,600±90 K
Metallicity [Fe/H]	−0.02 dex

Other designations
- CD−26°6647, CPD−26°3737, GC 12478, HD 77361, HIP 44290, HR 3597, SAO 176833, PPM 255522, TIC 37569580, TYC 6593-2444-1, GSC 06593-02444, IRAS 08590-2627, 2MASS J09011142-2639493, Gaia DR2 5649246148871668224

Database references
SIMBAD	data

HD 77361 is an orange-hued star in the southern constellation of Pyxis. With an apparent magnitude of 6.187, it can be faintly seen by the naked eye from Earth. As such, it is listed in the Bright Star Catalogue as HR 3597. It is located at a distance of 434 light-years (133 parsecs) according to Gaia DR3 parallax measurements. The star is notable for its unusually high lithium content.

== Physical properties ==
This is an aging red-giant branch star (RGB) at the RGB bump, with the spectral type K1III. This means that it has evolved past the main-sequence stage after exhausting its core hydrogen, causing it to bloat into a red giant. It has now reached a point where a discontinuity in hydrogen abundance produced by deep stellar convection results in a short-term decline in energy production, hampering its ascent of the RGB. The "CNII" in its spectral type indicates a strong cyanogen signature in the star's outer atmosphere, as strong as that of a normal K1 bright giant (luminosity class II).

According to a 2020 study, the star has a mass of 1.78 M_{☉}, an effective temperature of roughly 4,600 K (4,330 °C; 7,820 °F), and radiates 74.1 times the luminosity of the Sun from its photosphere. Some earlier publications, however, present smaller values for the mass (1.3±0.2 M_{☉} or 1.5±0.2 M_{☉}), luminosity (45.7 L_{☉}), and temperature (4,370±100 K). The star is slightly poorer in iron than the Sun, with a metallicity of [Fe/H]=−0.02 dex (10^{−0.02} ≈ 95% solar abundance).

== Anomalous abundances ==
The star is considered a super Li-rich star, a star so enhanced in lithium that its existence cannot be explained by the standard stellar evolution theory. It is thought that the lithium is actively being generated within the star, as unstable beryllium-7 atoms produced in the inner layers well up to the upper atmosphere via an unknown mechanism and then decay into stable lithium-7.

The star also has a very small ^{12}C/^{13}C ratio of 4.3±0.5, compared to 89.4±0.2 of the Sun. It was the first population I super Li-rich low-luminosity low-mass K giant discovered to have such a small ^{12}C/^{13}C ratio.

== Similar stars ==
The K-type giant star TYC 3251-581-1 is similar to HD 77361 in several aspects; namely, both stars have an extremely high lithium abundance and a low ^{12}C/^{13}C ratio, are currently at the RGB bump phase, and belong to the thin disk stellar population.
