= Epsilon Pyxidis =

Quadruple star system in the constellation Pyxis

- Location of ε Pyxidis (circled)

Observation data Epoch J2000.0 Equinox J2000.0 (ICRS)
- Constellation: Pyxis
- Right ascension: 09^{h} 09^{m} 56.41024^{s}
- Declination: −30° 21′ 55.4460″
- Apparent magnitude (V): +5.60

Characteristics
- Evolutionary stage: main sequence
- Spectral type: A4 IV
- U−B color index: +0.16
- B−V color index: +0.16

Astrometry
Radial velocity (R_{v})	−9.7±0.3 km/s
Proper motion (μ)	RA: −1.93 mas/yr Dec.: −48.99 mas/yr
Parallax (π)	15.39±0.30 mas
Distance	212 ± 4 ly (65 ± 1 pc)
Absolute magnitude (M_{V})	+2.00

Details

ε Pyx A
Mass	2.07 M_{☉}
Luminosity	19 L_{☉}
Surface gravity (log g)	3.26 cgs
Temperature	6368±1806 K
Metallicity [Fe/H]	+0.04 dex
Rotational velocity (v sin i)	108.3±0.3 km/s
Age	560 Myr

Other designations
- ε Pyx, CPD−29°2933, FK5 1241, HD 78922, HIP 45001, HR 3644, SAO 200047, WDS J09099-3022A

Database references
SIMBAD	data

Epsilon Pyxidis (ε Pyxidis) is a quadruple star system in the southern constellation of Pyxis. It is faintly visible to the naked eye, having a combined apparent visual magnitude of +5.60. Based upon an annual parallax shift of 15.39 mas as seen from Earth, it is located around 212 light years from the Sun. The system is deemed to be a member of the Sirius supercluster of stars that share a common motion through space.

The primary, component A, is a white-hued A-type subgiant star with a stellar classification of A4 IV. It is a microvariable, showing a 0.0056 change in magnitude with a frequency of 0.16245 times per day. Epsilon Pyxidis has been catalogued as an Am star, although this remains uncertain. It has double the mass of the Sun and radiates 19 times the Sun's luminosity from its photosphere at an effective temperature of 6,368 K.

In addition to a close companion of unknown type at an angular separation of 0.17 arc seconds, the primary shares an orbit with a binary star system, components B and C, that lie at an angular separation of 17.8 arc seconds. At the estimated distance of this system, this corresponds to a projected separation of around 1,150 AU. The B/C pair consist of visual magnitude 10.5 and 10.8 stars with a mean separation of 0.3 arc seconds. They have estimated mass of 90% and 95% that of the Sun, respectively.
