= Zeta Pyxidis =

Star in the constellation Pyxis

- Location of ζ Pyxidis (circled)

Observation data Epoch J2000.0 Equinox J2000.0 (ICRS)
- Constellation: Pyxis
- Right ascension: 08^{h} 39^{m} 42.47410^{s}
- Declination: −29° 33′ 39.8989″
- Apparent magnitude (V): +4.88 (4.97 + 9.59)

Characteristics
- Evolutionary stage: red clump
- Spectral type: G6 IIIb CN-0.5
- B−V color index: +0.90

Astrometry
Radial velocity (R_{v})	−30.10 km/s
Proper motion (μ)	RA: −24.81 mas/yr Dec.: −90.96 mas/yr
Parallax (π)	13.35±0.23 mas
Distance	244 ± 4 ly (75 ± 1 pc)
Absolute magnitude (M_{V})	+0.49

Details

ζ Pyx A
Mass	1.96 M_{☉}
Luminosity	69 L_{☉}
Surface gravity (log g)	2.72±0.06 cgs
Temperature	4,876±8 K
Metallicity [Fe/H]	−0.43±0.02 dex
Age	1.88 Gyr

Other designations
- ζ Pyx, CPD−29°2756, FK5 2680, HD 73898, HIP 42483, HR 3433, SAO 176253, WDS J08397-2934A

Database references
SIMBAD	data

Zeta Pyxidis (ζ Pyxidis) is a wide binary star system in the southern constellation of Pyxis. It is visible to the naked eye with a combined apparent visual magnitude of +4.88. Based upon an annual parallax shift of 13.35 mas as seen from Earth, it is located around 244 light years from the Sun.

The yellow-hued primary, component A, is an evolved G-type giant star with a stellar classification of G6 IIIb CN-0.5, where the suffix notation indicating it has anomalously weak lines of cyanogen. At the age of 1.88 billion years, is a red clump star that is generating energy through the fusion of helium at its core. The primary has nearly double the mass of the Sun and is radiating 69 times the Sun's luminosity from its photosphere at an effective temperature of 4,876 K.

The companion, component B, is a magnitude 9.59 star at an angular separation of 52.20 arc seconds along a position angle of 61°, as of 2010.
