= NGC 2566 =

Galaxy in the constellation Puppis

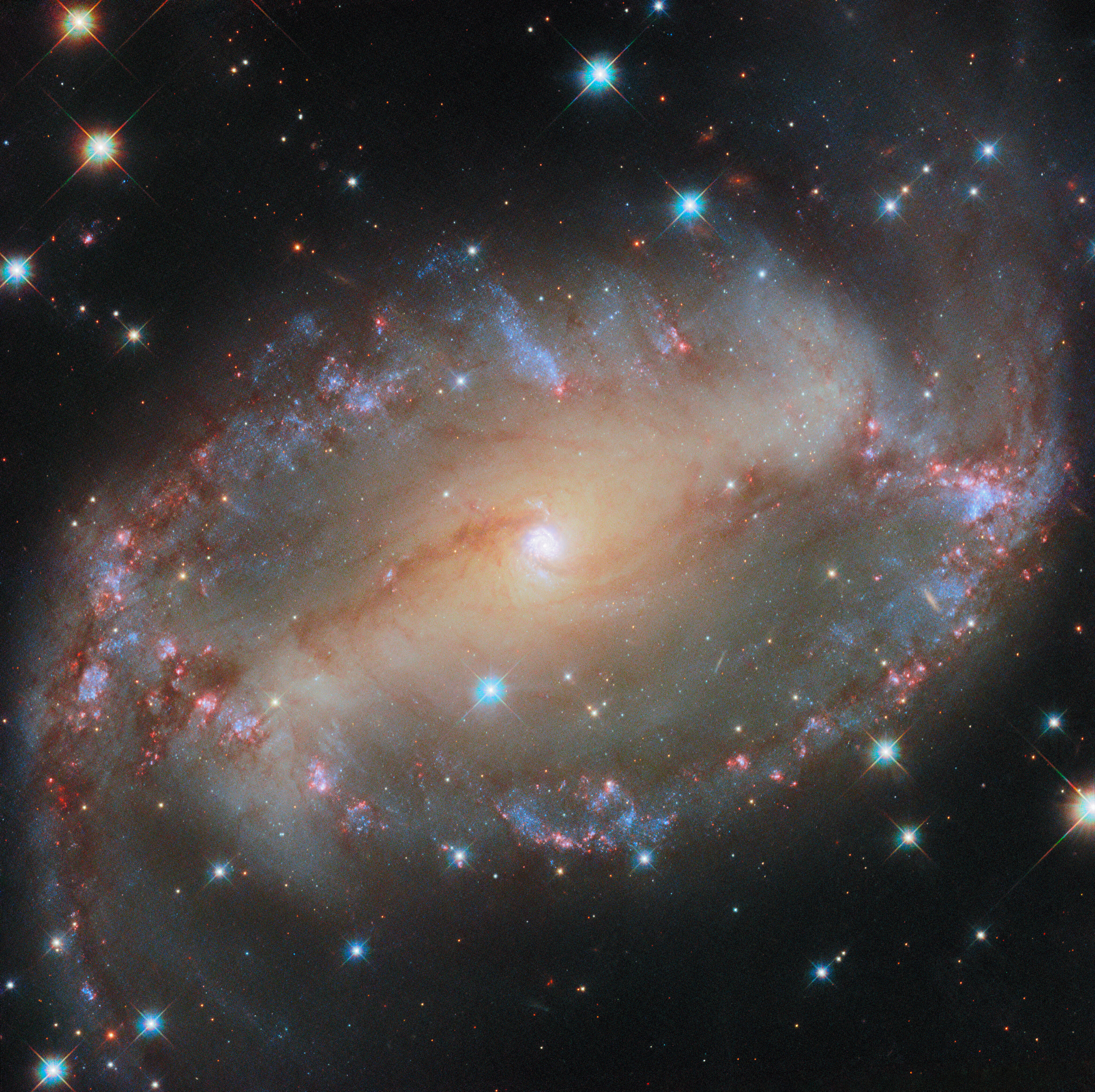
- NGC 2566 imaged by the Hubble Space Telescope

Observation data (J2000 epoch)
- Constellation: Puppis
- Right ascension: 08^{h} 18^{m} 45.6034^{s}
- Declination: −25° 29′ 58.053″
- Redshift: 0.005460
- Heliocentric radial velocity: 1637 ± 3 km/s
- Distance: 91.3 ± 6.5 Mly (28.00 ± 1.98 Mpc)
- Group or cluster: PGC 80593 Group
- Apparent magnitude (V): 11.0

Characteristics
- Type: (R')SB(rs)ab pec?
- Size: ~64,500 ly (19.77 kpc) (estimated)
- Apparent size (V): 2.9′ × 1.7′

Other designations
- ESO 495- G 003, IRAS 08166-2520, 2MASX J08184560-2529582, UGCA 138, MCG -04-20-008, PGC 23303

NGC 2566 is a barred spiral galaxy in the constellation of Puppis. Its velocity with respect to the cosmic microwave background is 1898 ± 19 km/s, which corresponds to a Hubble distance of 91.3 ± 6.5 Mly (28.00 ± 1.98 Mpc). However, five non-redshift measurements give a much closer distance of 35.39 ± 8.42 Mly (10.852 ± 2.583 Mpc). It was discovered by German-British astronomer William Herschel on 6 March 1785.

== Morphology ==
Eskridge, Frogel, and Pogge published a paper in 2002 describing the morphology of 205 closely spaced spiral or lenticular galaxies. The observations were made in the H-band of the infrared and in the B-band (blue). Eskridge and colleagues described NGC 2566 as a:

Nuclear point source embedded in a large slightly elliptical bulge. Bulge is threaded by a long, thin, bright bar. Underlying LSB [Low Surface Brightness] disk, with an outer ring/tightly wound spiral arms. The ring is irregular and lumpy but has no obvious bright knots of current star formation. The disk P.A. [Position Angle] is offset ~30 degrees away from that defined by the bar. The outer disk isophotes appear offset from the nucleus of the galaxy. However, sky irregularities make the disk hard to characterize.

== PGC 80593 Group ==
NGC 2566 is a member of the PGC 80593 Group (also known as [CM2004] 7), which contains 16 galaxies. In addition to NGC 2566 and PGC 80593, the group includes UGCA 137, IC 2311, NGC 2559, PGC 23156, and 10 other galaxies from the ESO catalogue. It is part of the Puppis Wall, which connects the Antlia Cluster with the Fornax Cluster.

== Image gallery ==
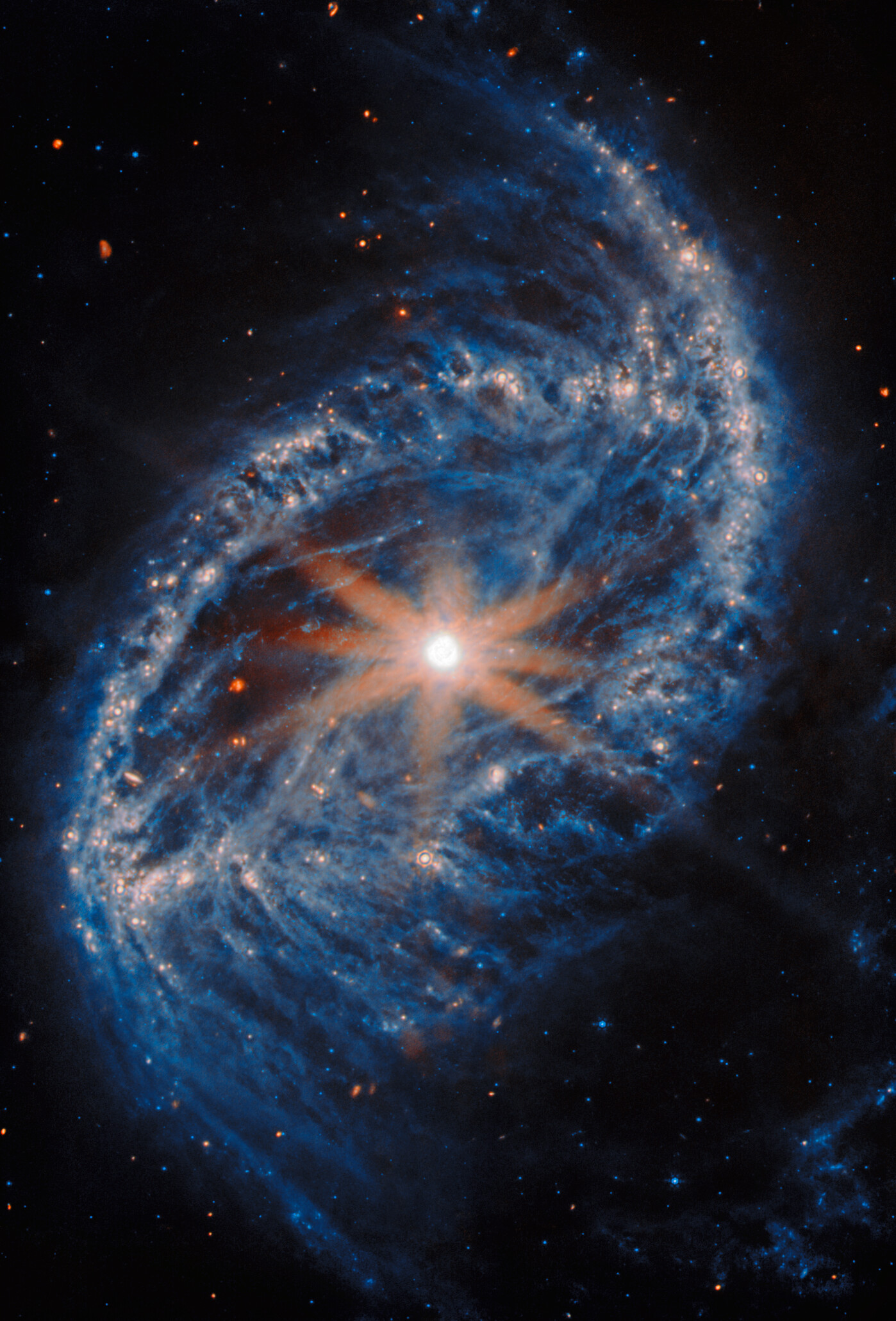
NGC 2566 imaged by the James Webb Space Telescope

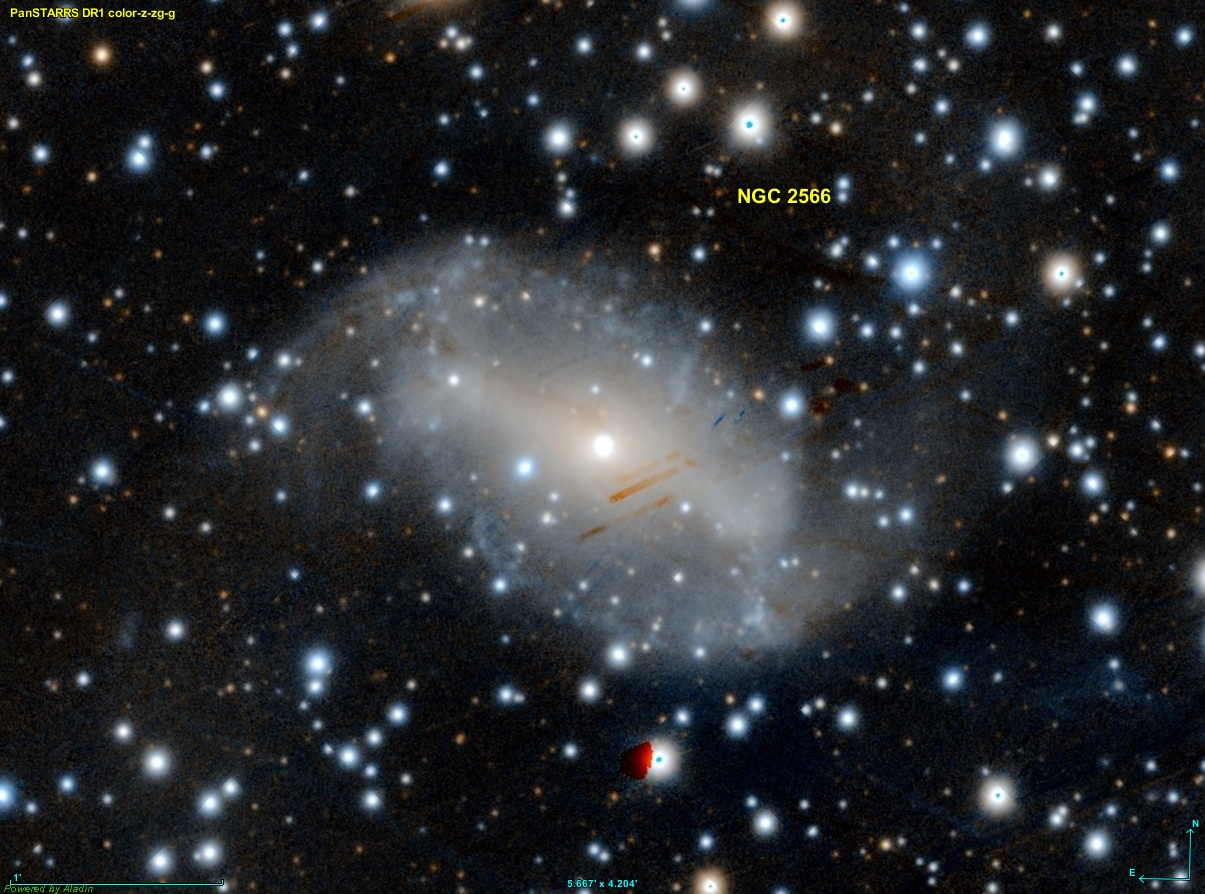
NGC 2566 imaged by Pan-STARRS

== See also ==
- List of NGC objects (2001–3000)
