= NGC 2818 =

Planetary nebula in the constellation Pyxis

Emission nebula
- Planetary nebula
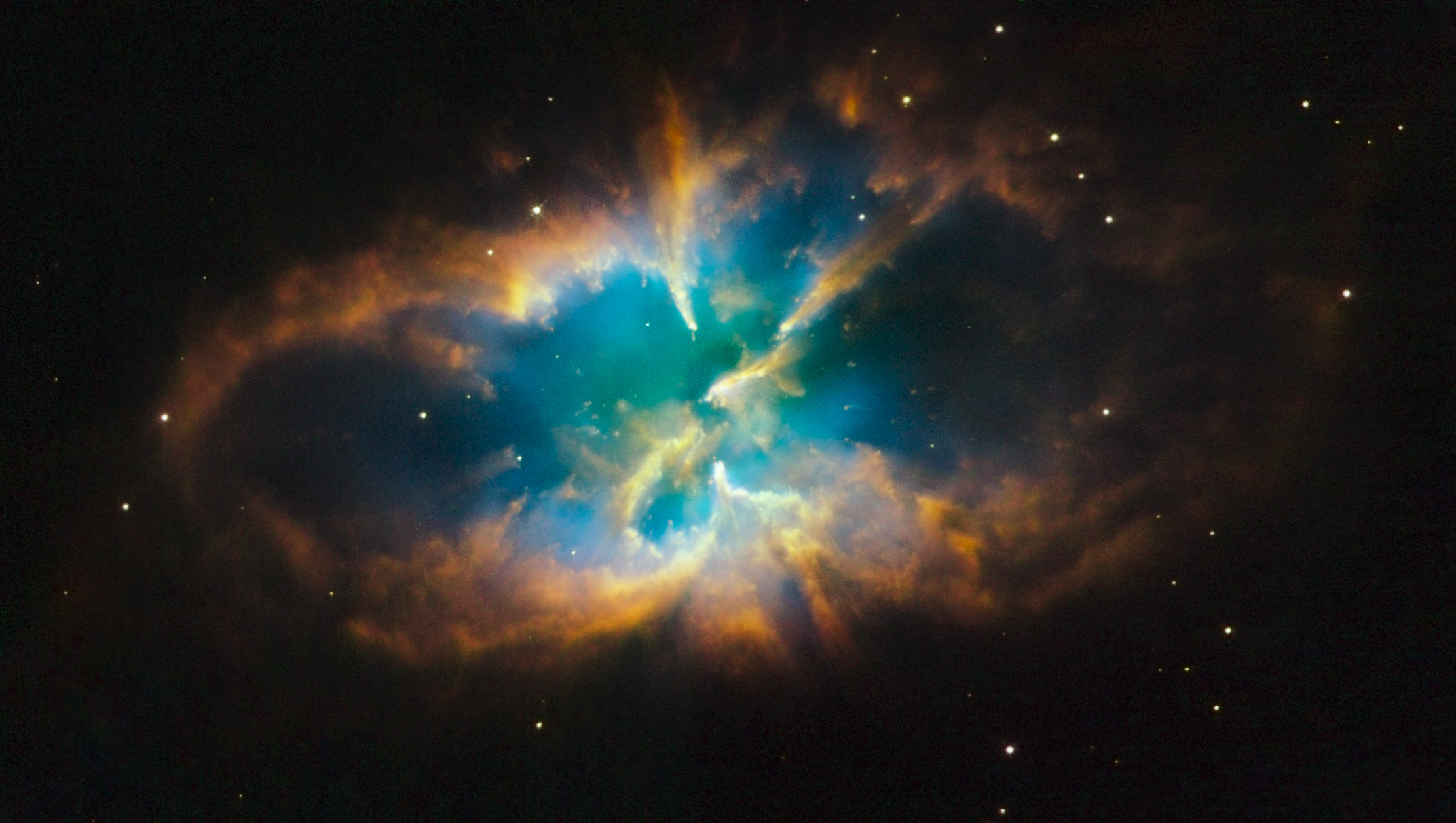
- Hubble Space Telescope image of NGC 2818 (red: nitrogen, green: hydrogen, blue: oxygen)

Observation data: J2000.0 epoch
- Right ascension: 09^{h} 16^{m} 01.656^{s}
- Declination: −36° 37′ 38.76″
- Distance: 10,400 ly
- Apparent dimensions (V): 2'
- Constellation: Pyxis

Physical characteristics
- Radius: 3.25 ly
- Designations: NGC 2818, PLN 261+8.1 ESO 372-PN13

NGC 2818 is a planetary nebula located in the southern constellation Pyxis (The Compass). It consists largely of glowing gases from the star's outer layers ejected during the final stages of its life when it had run out of the fuel necessary to sustain its core fusion processes. The remnants of its core will remain as a white dwarf.

NGC 2818 presents a complex morphology, and overall has bipolar structure, making it a bipolar nebula. The two lobes are somewhat broken and irregular. There are also filamentary structures radiating from the center, and near the center of the nebula, several cometary knots. The mass of the nebula is estimated at 0.6 solar masses. It is about 11,000 years old.

The progenitor star was likely about 2.3 times the mass of the Sun. The central star is very hot, with an effective temperature of 130 kK.

== Open cluster membership ==
NGC 2818 appears very close to the open cluster NGC 2818A. Whether it is a member of the open cluster has been controversial: earlier papers found the radial velocity differences between the planetary nebula and open cluster to a chance alignment. However, more recent studies suggest that NGC 2818 is indeed a member of NGC 2818A.

Partly because of their small total mass, open clusters have relatively poor gravitational cohesion. Consequently, open clusters tend to disperse after a relatively short time, typically some 10 million years, because of external gravitational influences amid other factors. Under exceptional conditions, open clusters can remain intact for up to 100 million years.

Theoretical models predict that planetary nebulae can form from main-sequence stars of between 8 and 1 solar masses, which puts their age at 40 million years and older. Although there are a few hundred known open clusters within that age range, a variety of reasons limit the chances of finding a member of an open cluster in a planetary nebula phase. One such reason is that the planetary nebula phase for more massive stars belonging to younger clusters is on the order of thousands of years - a blink of the eye in cosmic terms. Only one association has been established between open clusters and nearby nebulae, the extremely distant nebula PHR 1315-6555.
