= Hen 2-10 =

Galaxy in the constellation Pyxis

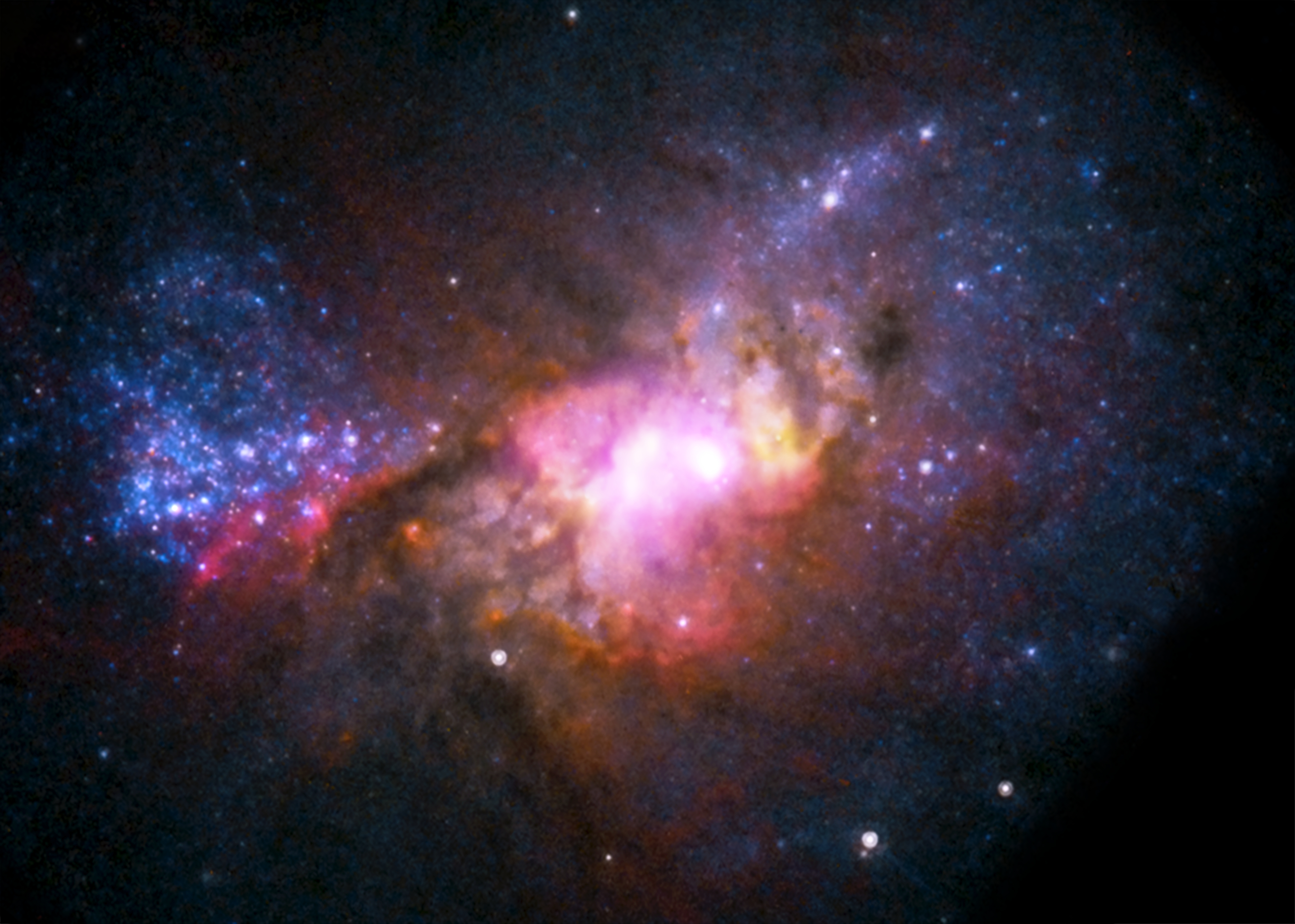
- A composite image of Hen 2-10. Visual data comes from the Hubble Space Telescope, X-ray data comes from the Chandra X-Ray Observatory, and radio data comes from the Very Large Array.

Observation data (J2000 epoch)
- Constellation: Pyxis
- Right ascension: 08^{h} 36^{m} 15^{s}
- Declination: −26° 24′ 34″
- Redshift: 0.002912
- Heliocentric radial velocity: 873 km/s
- Galactocentric velocity: 657 km/s
- Distance: 34.24 Mly
- Apparent magnitude (V): 11.09 (R Band)

Characteristics
- Type: dwarf
- Mass: ~1×10^{10} M_{☉}
- Apparent size (V): 1.8'

Other designations
- ESO 495-21, MCG-04-21-005, PGC 24171/24175

Hen 2-10, also known as He 2-10 and Henize 2-10, is a dwarf starburst galaxy located 34 million light years away in the constellation of Pyxis. The galaxy is believed to be an early stage starburst galaxy. A black hole was later discovered near the center of the dwarf galaxy, suggesting that the black holes found at the center of most large galaxies may have formed before the galaxies themselves. Recent estimates have placed the mass of this black hole around 3×10^{6} M_{☉}, and the mass of the entire dwarf galaxy at about 1×10^{10} M_{☉}.

== History ==
Henize 2-10 draws its name from a catalog of planetary nebulae assembled by astronomer Karl Henize. Henize additionally noted that the object was identified in an unpublished paper by Rudolph Minkowski. The object was likely misidentified as a planetary nebula due to the galaxy's strong emission lines, a feature common of planetary nebulas.

It was not until the 1970s when observations of Hen 2-10 indicated that the center of the object was a strong source of radio waves that it was shown that Hen 2-10 was a dwarf galaxy rather than a planetary nebula. Supporting evidence for the reclassification came in the form of excess infrared emission and a higher than usual density of neutral hydrogen.

== Structure ==
Hen 2-10 is a starburst galaxy featuring at least two star-forming regions near the center of the galaxy. These regions feature a variety of different substances, and multiple super star clusters. A study of some of these SSCs estimates their age to be between 4 and 5 megayears. The galaxy also features emission typical of that in a Wolf–Rayet star, further providing evidence for the starburst region of the galaxy. It was one of the first galaxies found to feature this emission. The strong prevalence of this emission has led to its classification as a Wolf–Rayet galaxy, a special subclass of starburst galaxy that features a higher than normal number of Wolf–Rayet stars.

Furthermore, observations have shown irregularities in the southeast portion of the galaxy which could be interpreted as a tidal tail. This tidal tail suggests that Hen 2-10 may have had past interactions with other galaxies, possibly even a merger event.

=== Central black hole ===
In 2011, a team of researchers studied the non-thermal emission of the galaxy center and indicated that the source strengths of radio waves are too strong to come from x-ray binaries while the source strengths of x-rays are too strong to be supernova remnants. However, these sources do align with known data for black holes. This original paper postulated the mass of the black hole to be ~1×10^{6} M_{☉}, but a newer study has refined the estimate to 3×10^{6} M_{☉}.

The presence of SSCs near the center of the galaxy, and not a singular nuclear star cluster (NSC) has led some to believe that Hen 2-10 is a galaxy in its early years. The presence of the black hole is seen to be evidence of the dissipationless model of NSC formation. In this model, the SSCs will move to the center and form a singular NSC. Due to the black hole's relatively small mass, it is not believed to have a major effect on the timescale of this motion, although it is not yet understood how the black hole will affect the NSC formation. Ignoring the black hole indicates that the NSC should be fully formed in a few hundred million years.
