= Lambda Pyxidis =

Star in the constellation Pyxis

- Location of λ Pyxidis (circled)

Observation data Epoch J2000.0 Equinox J2000.0 (ICRS)
- Constellation: Pyxis
- Right ascension: 09^{h} 23^{m} 12.25099^{s}
- Declination: −28° 50′ 01.9420″
- Apparent magnitude (V): 4.68

Characteristics
- Evolutionary stage: red clump
- Spectral type: G8.5 IIIb Fe−1
- U−B color index: +0.63
- B−V color index: +0.91

Astrometry
Radial velocity (R_{v})	+10.2 km/s
Proper motion (μ)	RA: −128.25 mas/yr Dec.: +20.70 mas/yr
Parallax (π)	16.98±0.24 mas
Distance	192 ± 3 ly (58.9 ± 0.8 pc)
Absolute magnitude (M_{V})	+0.93±0.02

Details
Mass	2.47±0.06 M_{☉}
Radius	8.03±0.14 R_{☉}
Luminosity	41±1 L_{☉}
Surface gravity (log g)	3.030±0.059 cgs
Temperature	5,152±28 K
Metallicity [Fe/H]	+0.004±0.025 dex
Rotational velocity (v sin i)	4.4±0.2 km/s

Other designations
- λ Pyx, CPD−28°3717, FK5 2747, HD 81169, HIP 46026, HR 3733, SAO 177374

Database references
SIMBAD	data

Lambda Pyxidis (λ Pyxidis) is a yellow-hued star in the southern constellation of Pyxis. It is visible to the naked eye, having an apparent visual magnitude of 4.68. Based upon an annual parallax shift of 16.98 mas as seen from Earth, it is located around 192 light years from the Sun.

Measurements of changes in the star's proper motion over time indicate this is an astrometric binary system. The visible component is an evolved G-type giant star with a stellar classification of G8.5 IIIb Fe−1 and a spectrum that displays an underabundance of iron with weak cyanogen lines. It is a red clump star that is generating energy through the fusion of helium at its core.

Lambda Pyxidis has 2.47 times the mass of the Sun and 8.0 times the radius of the Sun. It is radiating 41 times the Sun's luminosity from its photosphere at an effective temperature of 5,152 K.
