= UZ Pyxidis =

Star in the constellation Pyxis

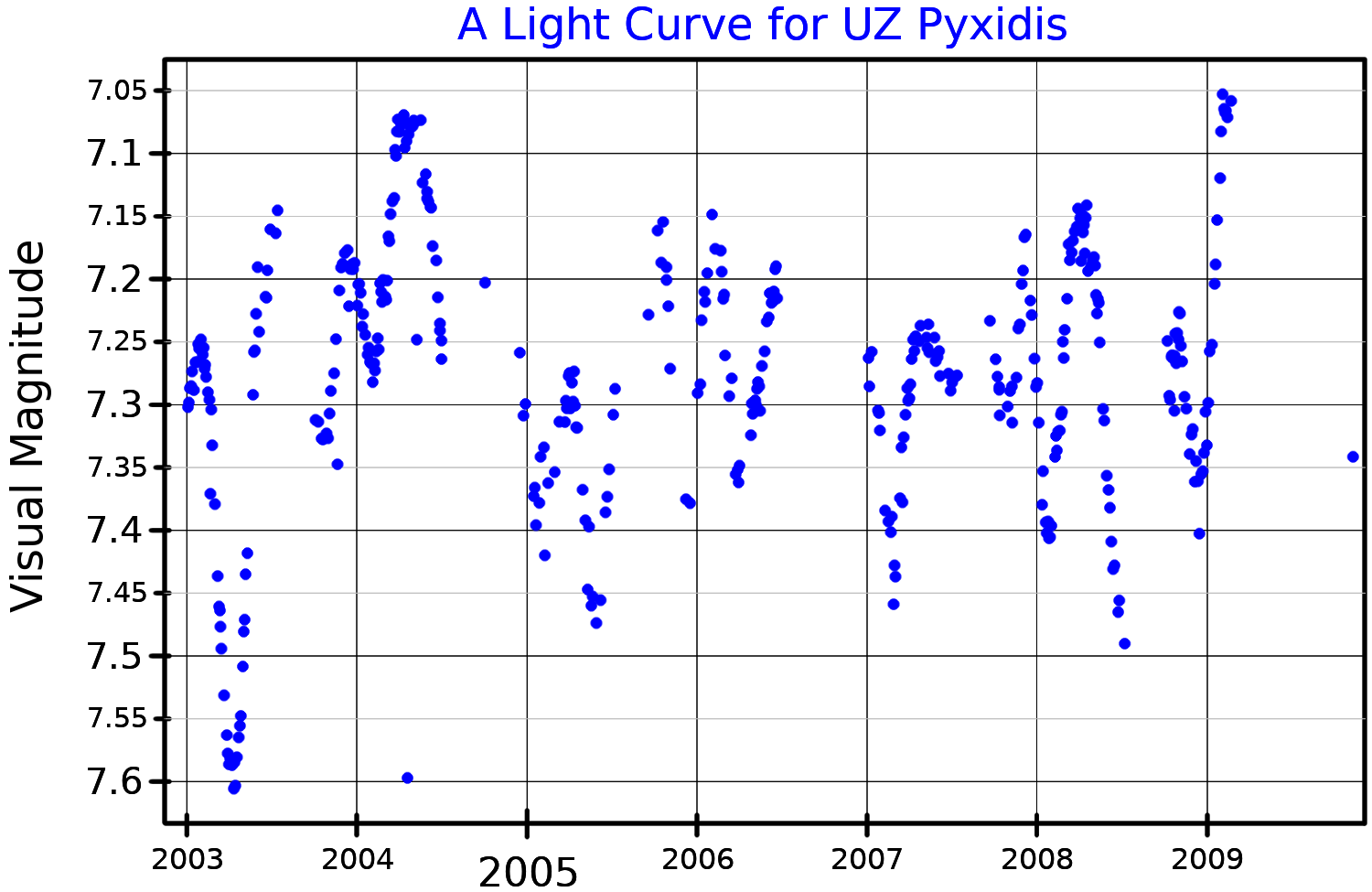
- A visual band light curve for UZ Pyxidis, plotted from ASAS data

Observation data Epoch J2000 Equinox J2000
- Constellation: Pyxis
- Right ascension: 08^{h} 46^{m} 36.3323^{s}
- Declination: −29° 43′ 41.203″
- Apparent magnitude (V): 6.99 - 7.63

Characteristics
- Evolutionary stage: AGB
- Spectral type: C5_{5}J (R8)
- U−B color index: +2.99
- B−V color index: +2.01
- Variable type: SRb

Astrometry
| Radial velocity (R_{v}) | 13.00 km/s |
| Proper motion (μ) | RA: −5.767 mas/yr Dec.: 1.674 mas/yr |
| Parallax (π) | 0.8949±0.0183 mas |
| Distance | 3,640 ± 70 ly (1,120 ± 20 pc) |
| Absolute magnitude (M_{V}) | −1.2 |

Details
| Mass | 2.1 M_{☉} |
| Radius | 221 R_{☉} |
| Luminosity | 5,649 L_{☉} |
| Surface gravity (log g) | −0.236 cgs |
| Temperature | 3,325 K |
| Metallicity [Fe/H] | −0.32 dex |

Other designations
- UZ Pyx, CD-29°6735, HD 75021, HIP 43093, SAO 176458, GC 12117

Database references
| SIMBAD | data |

UZ Pyxidis (HD 75021) is a semiregular variable star in the constellation Pyxis. It is located about 3,600 light-years (1,100 parsecs) away from the Earth.

UZ Pyxidis lies directly between α and γ Pyxidis. It has a common proper motion companion, HD 75022, less than 2' away but the two are not listed in double star catalogues.

UZ Pyxidis is a carbon star. These types of stars are known for having large amounts of carbon in their atmospheres, forming carbon compounds that make the star appear strikingly red. It was first recognised as having an unusual spectrum in 1893. Under the Morgan–Keenan classification of carbon stars, UZ Pyxidis' spectral type is C5_{5}; if it were a normal giant star, this would correspond to a spectral type of about K5. It is also unusual in that it has very strong isotopic bands of C_{2} and CN.

There were hints that the star is variable as early as the late 19th century, and its variability was firmly established by Olin J. Eggen in 1972. The variable star designation UZ Pyxidis was assigned in 1978. UZ Pyxidis is classified as a semiregular variable with a dominant period of 159.6 days. It varies in brightness between magnitude 6.99 and 7.63.
