= HD 77338 =

Star in the constellation Pyxis

Observation data Epoch J2000 Equinox ICRS
- Constellation: Pyxis
- Right ascension: 09^{h} 01^{m} 12.493^{s}
- Declination: −25° 31′ 37.43″
- Apparent magnitude (V): 8.63

Characteristics
- Evolutionary stage: main sequence
- Spectral type: K0 IV
- B−V color index: 0.833±0.002

Astrometry
Radial velocity (R_{v})	8.209 km/s
Proper motion (μ)	RA: 40.095 mas/yr Dec.: −271.640 mas/yr
Parallax (π)	21.8739±0.0192 mas
Distance	149.1 ± 0.1 ly (45.72 ± 0.04 pc)
Absolute magnitude (M_{V})	5.58

Details
Mass	0.942 M_{☉}
Radius	0.97±0.02 R_{☉}
Luminosity	0.708 L_{☉}
Surface gravity (log g)	4.42 cgs
Temperature	5,315 K
Metallicity [Fe/H]	0.16 dex
Rotation	33.4±10.0 d
Rotational velocity (v sin i)	1.3 km/s
Age	9.5 Gyr

Other designations
- CD−25 6797, HD 77338, HIP 44291, TYC 6589-761-1, 2MASS J09011248-2531371

Database references
SIMBAD	data

HD 77338 is a star with a close orbiting exoplanet companion in the southern constellation of Pyxis. It is too dim to be visible with the naked eye, having an apparent visual magnitude of 8.63. The system is located at a distance of 149 light years, and it is drifting further away with a heliocentric radial velocity of 8.2 km/s.

The spectrum of this star presents as a K-type subgiant with a stellar classification of K0 IV. This indicates the star has exhausted the supply of hydrogen at its core and has begun to evolve away from the main sequence. It has 94% of the mass of the Sun and 97% of the Sun's girth. The star is spinning with a rotation period of roughly 33 days. It is radiating 71% of the luminosity of the Sun from its photosphere at an effective temperature of 5,315 K.

HD 77338 is enriched in its concentration of elements more massive than helium compared to the Sun, with a metallicity of 0.16, but is much older at an age of 9.5 billion years. It is unusually enriched in heavy elements for a star of its age. The anomalously high abundance of ions of manganese may indicate the star has recently passed through the common shell stage (engulfed a planet).

== Planetary system ==
In 2012, a planet, named HD 77338b, was discovered by the radial velocity method on a tight orbit with uncertain eccentricity. Its equilibrium temperature is 954.8 K.

The HD 77338 planetary system
Companion (in order from star)	Mass	Semimajor axis (AU)	Orbital period (days)	Eccentricity	Inclination (°)	Radius
b	≥15.9^{+4.7}_{−5.3} M_{🜨}	0.0614^{+0.0031}_{−0.0034}	5.73610±0.0015	0.09^{+0.22}_{−0.09}	—	—
