= Pyxis globular cluster =

Globular cluster in the constellation Pyxis

Observation data (J2000 epoch)
- Constellation: Pyxis
- Right ascension: 09^{h} 07^{m} 57.80^{s}
- Declination: –37° 13′ 17.0″
- Distance: 130 kly (40 kpc)

Physical characteristics
- Metallicity: [Fe/H] = −1.20±0.15 dex
- Estimated age: 13.3±1.3 Gyr
- Other designations: Pyxis globular cluster

The Pyxis globular cluster is a globular cluster in the constellation Pyxis. It lies around 130,000 light-years distant from earth and around 133,000 light-years distant from the centre of the Milky Way—a distance not previously thought to contain globular clusters. It is around 13.3 ± 1.3 billion years old. Discovered in 1995 by astronomer Ronald Weinberger while he was looking for planetary nebulae, it is in the Galactic halo. Irwin and colleagues noted that it appears to lie on the same plane as the Large Magellanic Cloud and raised the possibility that it might be an escaped object from that galaxy.
