= Gliese 318 =

White dwarf in the constellation Pyxis

Observation data Epoch J2000 Equinox ICRS
- Constellation: Pyxis
- Right ascension: 08^{h} 41^{m} 32.42908^{s}
- Declination: −32° 56′ 32.9158″
- Apparent magnitude (V): 11.85

Characteristics
- Evolutionary stage: white dwarf
- Spectral type: DA5.5
- U−B color index: −0.59
- B−V color index: +0.25

Astrometry
Radial velocity (R_{v})	+29.3±2.9 km/s
Proper motion (μ)	RA: −1,061.158 mas/yr Dec.: +1,345.900 mas/yr
Parallax (π)	117.3961±0.0205 mas
Distance	27.783 ± 0.005 ly (8.518 ± 0.001 pc)
Absolute magnitude (M_{V})	12.22±0.04

Details
Mass	0.47±0.02 M_{☉}
Radius	0.0148 ± 0.00092 (Note: Applying the Stefan–Boltzmann law with a nominal solar effective temperature of 5,772 K: $$\sqrt{\biggl(\frac{5,772}{9,040}\biggr)^4 \cdot 10^{-2.88}} = 0.0148\ R_\odot$$.) R_{☉}
Luminosity	1.32+0.13 −0.12×10^{−3} L_{☉}
Surface gravity (log g)	7.77±0.03 cgs
Temperature	9,040±190 K
Age	590±40 (Note: This is just the cooling age) Myr

Other designations
- GJ 318, CD−32°5613, LHS 253, L 532-81, LTT 3218, WD 0839-327

Database references
SIMBAD	data
ARICNS	data

Gliese 318 is a white dwarf in the constellation Pyxis. Its spectral type is DA5.5 and it has a visual magnitude of 11.85, and lies 27.8 light-years (8.5 parsecs) away.

The star was too faint to have had its parallax measured by the Hipparcos satellite. Earth-based measurement in 2009 gave its parallax as 113.63±1.97 milliarcseconds, yielding a distance of 28.7±0.5 light-years; this parallax measurement has since been substantially improved by Gaia.

Gliese 318 is a rather young white dwarf with an age estimated to be 590 million years. Its temperature is around 9,000 K and it shines with 0.13 percent of the luminosity of the Sun. Like all white dwarfs, Gliese 318 is small, with just 1.5 percent the Sun's radius (1.6 R_{🜨}), but has around half the Sun's mass.

Bragaglia et al. suspect this star to be a double white dwarf due to strong spectral line variations. From Gaia DR2 it was not possible to confirm this claim. It is still possible that Gliese 318 is a double white dwarf and additional spectroscopic observations are needed in order to confirm this claim. Gliese 318 could be the closest double white dwarf to earth.
