= XX Pyxidis =

Star in the constellation Pyxis

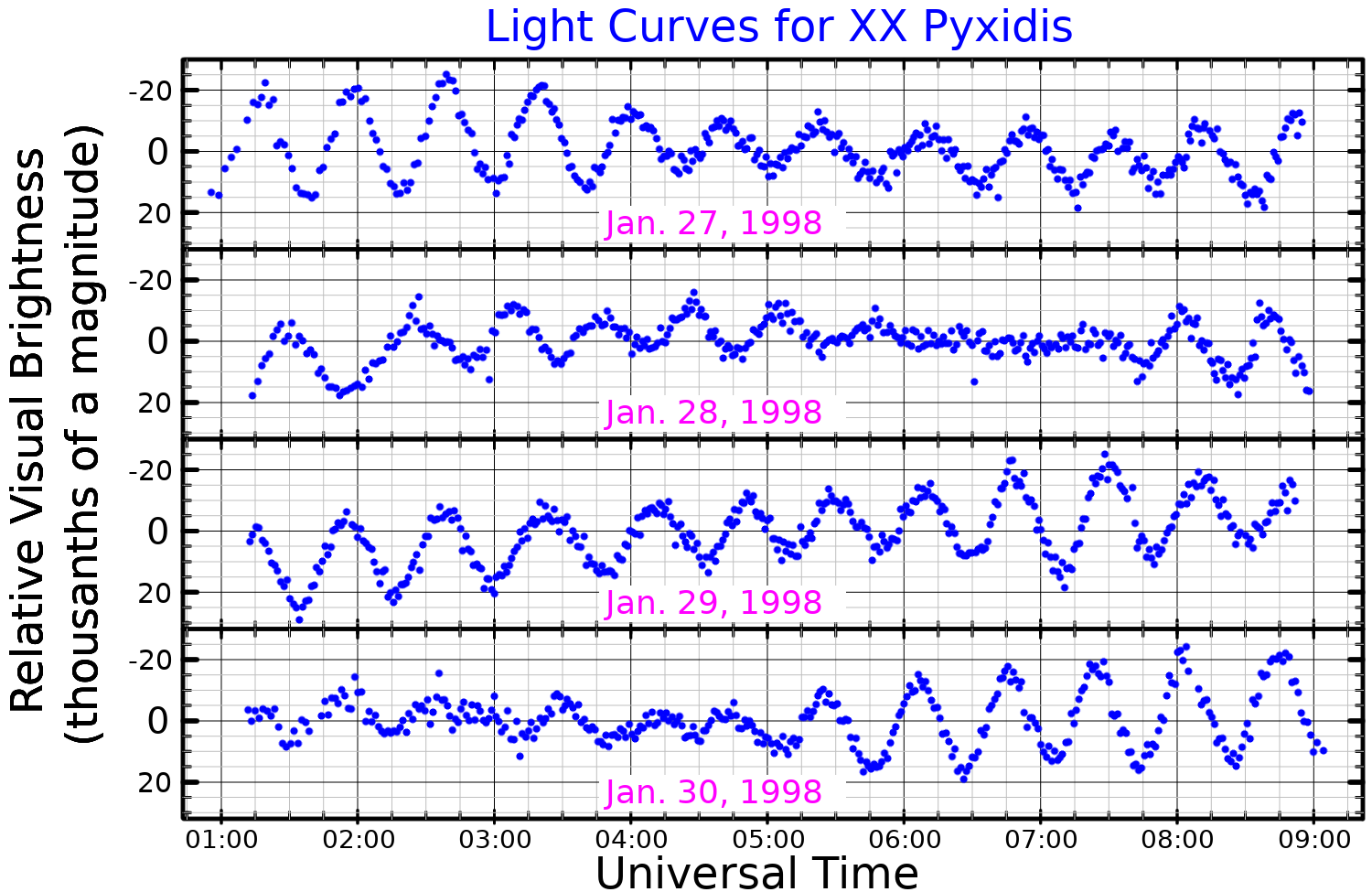
- Visual band light curves for XX Pyxidis, adapted from Arentoft et al. (2001)

Observation data Epoch J2000 Equinox ICRS
- Constellation: Pyxis
- Right ascension: 08^{h} 58^{m} 39.03^{s}
- Declination: −24° 35′ 10.6″
- Apparent magnitude (V): 11.49

Characteristics
- Evolutionary stage: main sequence
- Spectral type: A4V + M3V
- Variable type: Delta Scuti variable

Astrometry
Proper motion (μ)	RA: −13.830 mas/yr Dec.: +6.985 mas/yr
Parallax (π)	1.4301±0.0341 mas
Distance	2,280 ± 50 ly (700 ± 20 pc)

Orbit
Period (P)	1.15 d
Eccentricity (e)	0.0
Inclination (i)	25-30°
Semi-amplitude (K_{1}) (primary)	17.8±0.4 km/s

Details

Hot star
Mass	1.85±0.05 M_{☉}
Radius	1.9 R_{☉}
Luminosity	27 L_{☉}
Surface gravity (log g)	4.21 cgs
Temperature	9,431 K
Metallicity [Fe/H]	+0.09 dex
Rotation	1.5 d
Rotational velocity (v sin i)	52 km/s
Age	316 Myr

Cool star
Mass	0.3 M_{☉}

Other designations
- XX Pyxidis, CD−24 7599, GSC 06589-00261

Database references
SIMBAD	data

XX Pyxidis is a star located in the constellation Pyxis. It has an apparent magnitude that varies slightly at about 11.5, and is about 2,300 light years away.

XX Pyxidis is one of the more-studied members of a class of stars known as Delta Scuti variables—short-period (six hours at most) pulsating stars that have been used as standard candles and as subjects to study astroseismology. Astronomers made more sense of its pulsations when it became clear that it is also a binary star system. The main star is a white main sequence star of spectral type A4V that is around 1.85±0.05 times as massive as the Sun. Its companion is most likely a red dwarf star of spectral type M3V, around 0.3 times as massive as the Sun. The two are very close—possibly only 3 times the diameter of the Sun between them—and orbit each other every 1.15 days. The brighter star is deformed into an egg-shape, and pulsates in several overlapping modes 26-76 times per day.
