= TY Pyxidis =

Star in the constellation Pyxis

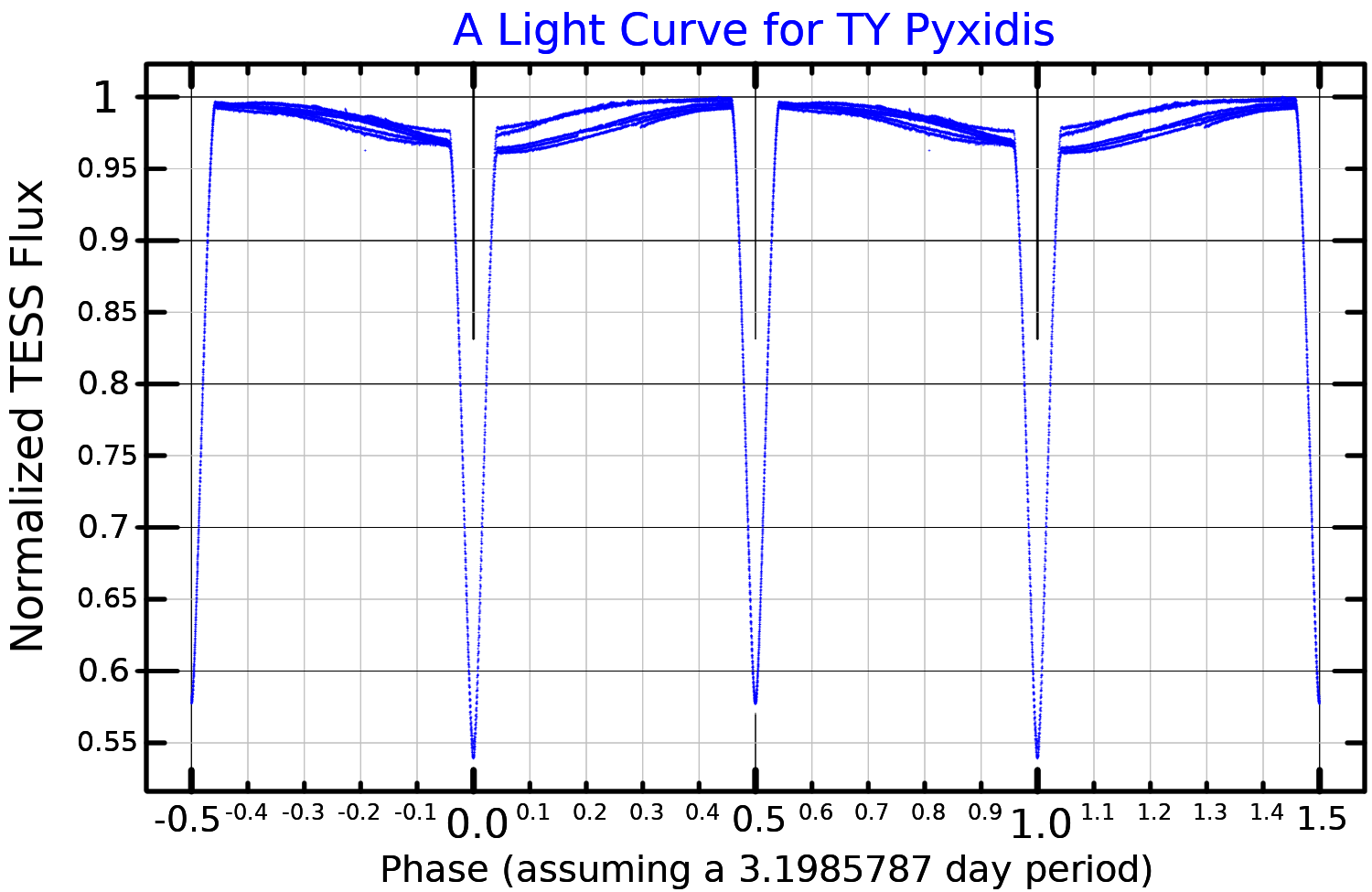
- A light curve for TY Pyxidis, plotted from TESS data

Observation data Epoch J2000 Equinox ICRS
- Constellation: Pyxis
- Right ascension: 08^{h} 59^{m} 42.72169^{s}
- Declination: –27° 48′ 58.6885″
- Apparent magnitude (V): 6.85 - 7.5

Characteristics
- Spectral type: G5IV + G5IV
- Variable type: RS Canum Venaticorum variable

Astrometry
Radial velocity (R_{v})	+63.20 ± 1 km/s
Proper motion (μ)	RA: –44.46 ± 0.34 mas/yr Dec.: –44.36 ± 0.42 mas/yr
Parallax (π)	17.73±0.52 mas
Distance	184 ± 5 ly (56 ± 2 pc)

Details
Radius	2.2 R_{☉}
Temperature	5400 K

Other designations
- TY Pyxidis, CD−27° 6141, HD 77137, HIP 44164, SAO 176805.

Database references
SIMBAD	data

TY Pyxidis is an eclipsing binary star in the constellation Pyxis. The apparent magnitude ranges from 6.85 to 7.5 over 3.2 days.

The two components are both of spectral type G5IV, have a mass of 1.2 solar masses and revolve around each other every 3.2 days. Each star is around 2.2 times the diameter of the Sun.

The system is classified as either a RS Canum Venaticorum variable or a BY Draconis variable, stars that vary on account of prominent starspot activity, and lies 184 ± 5 light years away. The system emits X-rays, and analysing the emission curve over time led Pres and colleagues to conclude that there was a loop of material arcing between the two stars.
