= Kappa Pyxidis =

Star in the constellation Pyxis

κ Pyxidis
- Location of κ Pyxidis (circled)

Observation data Epoch J2000 Equinox ICRS
- Constellation: Pyxis
- Right ascension: 09^{h} 08^{m} 02.88015^{s}
- Declination: −25° 51′ 30.7331″
- Apparent magnitude (V): 4.62

Characteristics
- Spectral type: K4III
- U−B color index: +1.87
- B−V color index: +1.594±0.004

Astrometry
Radial velocity (R_{v})	−44.7±2.8 km/s
Proper motion (μ)	RA: +34.771 mas/yr Dec.: +0.009 mas/yr
Parallax (π)	6.3116±0.2408 mas
Distance	520 ± 20 ly (158 ± 6 pc)
Absolute magnitude (M_{V})	−1.53

Details
Radius	66.70+0.34 −2.34 R_{☉}
Luminosity	927±40 L_{☉}
Surface gravity (log g)	1.44±0.22 cgs
Temperature	3,931±31 K
Metallicity [Fe/H]	−0.22±0.08 dex

Other designations
- κ Pyx, CPD−25°4067, GC 12614, HD 78541, HIP 44824, HR 3628, SAO 177002, PPM 255695, CCDM J09080-2552AB, WDS J09080-2552AB

Database references
SIMBAD	data

Kappa Pyxidis, Latinized from κ Pyxidis, is a single, orange-hued star in the southern constellation of Pyxis. It is visible to the naked eye as a faint point of light with an apparent visual magnitude of +4.62. The star is located approximately 520 light years from the Sun based on parallax, but is drifting closer with a radial velocity of −45 km/s and may come as close as 308 light-years in around 2.6 million years. It is moving through space at the rate of 53.7 km/s relative to the Sun and is following an orbit through the Milky Way galaxy with a large eccentricity of 0.68

This is an aging giant with a stellar classification of K4III, having exhausted the supply of hydrogen at its core then expanded and cooled. At present it has 67 times the radius of the Sun. It is a variable star of uncertain type, changing brightness with an amplitude of 0.0058 in visual magnitude over a period of 8.5 days. The star radiates 927 times the luminosity of the Sun from its bloated photosphere at an effective temperature of 3,931 K. A magnitude 10 visual companion is located at an angular separation of 2.1 arcseconds.
