= RZ Pyxidis =

Star in the constellation Pyxis

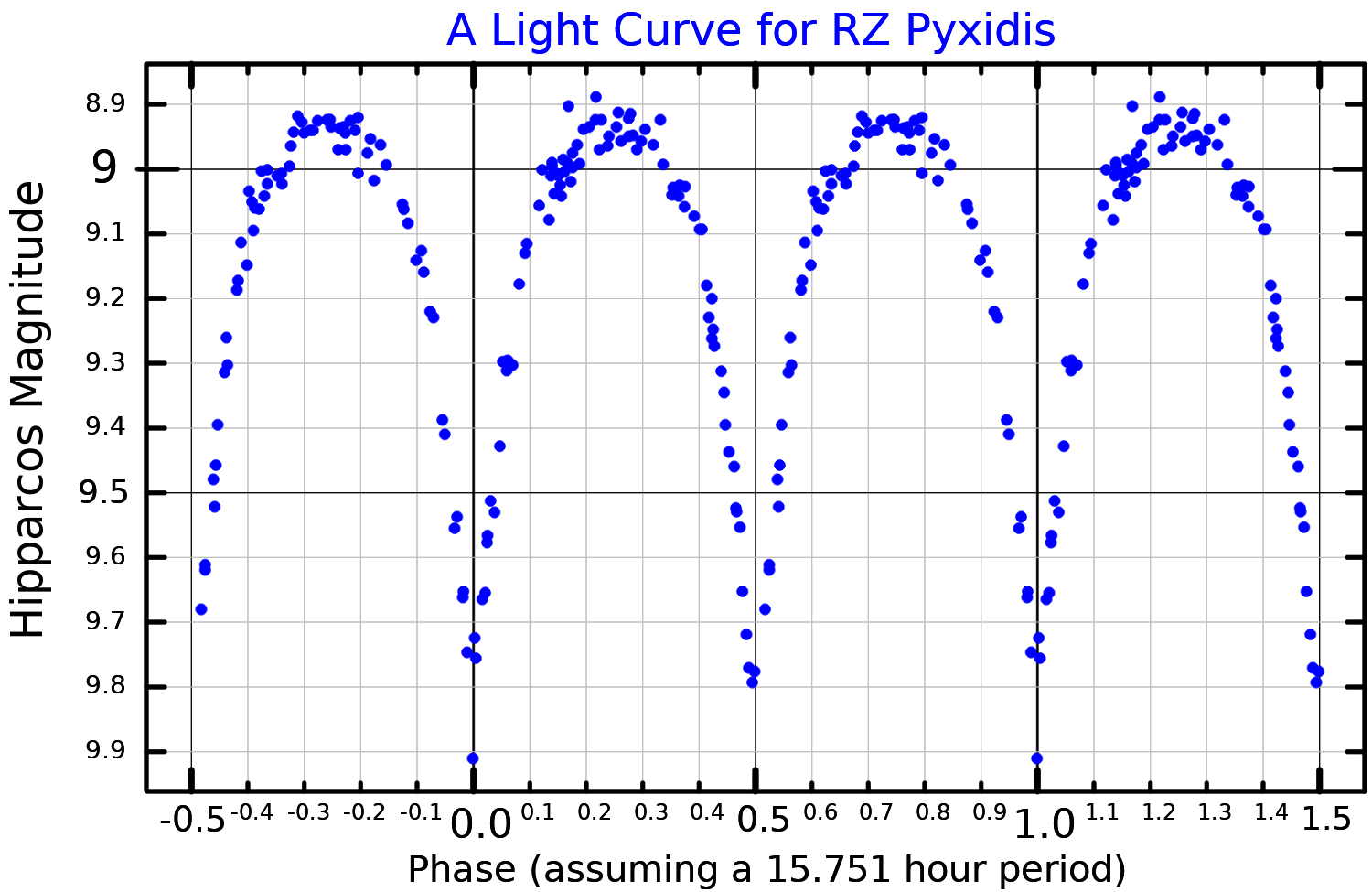
- A light curve for RZ Pyxidis, plotted from Hipparcos data

Observation data Epoch J2000 Equinox ICRS
- Constellation: Pyxis
- Right ascension: 08^{h} 52^{m} 04.39659^{s}
- Declination: −27° 29′ 01.4808″
- Apparent magnitude (V): 8.83 - 9.72

Characteristics
- Spectral type: B7V
- Variable type: Beta Lyrae variable

Astrometry
Radial velocity (R_{v})	+22.00±7.4 km/s
Proper motion (μ)	RA: −4.67 mas/yr Dec.: +4.61 mas/yr
Parallax (π)	2.68±1.67 mas
Distance	approx. 1,200 ly (approx. 400 pc)

Other designations
- RZ Pyxidis, CD−27°6009, HD 75920, HIP 43541, SAO 176601

Database references
SIMBAD	data

RZ Pyxidis is eclipsing binary system in the constellation Pyxis, made up of two young stars less than two millions years old. Both are hot blue-white stars of spectral type B7V and are around 2.5 times the size of the Sun. One is around five times as luminous as the sun and the other around four times as luminous. The system is classified as a Beta Lyrae variable, the apparent magnitude ranging from 8.83 to 9.72 over 0.66 days.
