= T Pyxidis =

Recurrent nova star in the constellation Pyxis

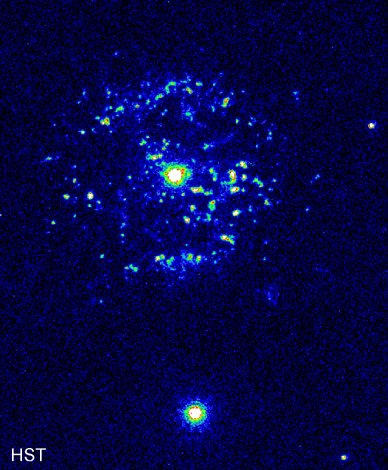
- T Pyx surrounded by the nova remnants of a previous outburst. Hubble Space Telescope composite

Observation data Epoch J2000 Equinox ICRS
- Constellation: Pyxis
- Right ascension: 09^{h} 04^{m} 41.5062^{s}
- Declination: −32° 22′ 47.503″
- Apparent magnitude (V): 6.4 Max. 18.5 Min.

Characteristics
- Spectral type: White Dwarf
- Variable type: Recurrent nova

Astrometry
| Proper motion (μ) | RA: −2.531±0.052 mas/yr Dec.: 0.177±0.062 mas/yr |
| Parallax (π) | 0.3051±0.0419 mas |
| Distance | 3185+607 −283 pc |

Details

White dwarf
| Mass | 0.7±0.2 M_{☉} |

Second component
| Mass | 0.14±0.03 M_{☉} |

Orbit
| Period (P) | 1.8295 hours |
| Inclination (i) | 10±2° |

Other designations
- Nova Pyx 1890, AAVSO 0900-31, 2MASS J09044150-3222474, Gaia DR2 5628258258606112768

Database references
| SIMBAD | data |

T Pyxidis (T Pyx) is a recurrent nova and nova remnant in the constellation Pyxis. It is a binary star system and its distance is estimated at 4,783 parsecs (15,600 light-years) from Earth. It contains a Sun-like star and a white dwarf. Because of their close proximity and the larger mass of the white dwarf, the latter draws matter from the larger, less massive star. The influx of matter on the white dwarf's surface causes periodic thermonuclear explosions to occur.

The usual apparent magnitude of this star system is 15.5, but there have been observed eruptions with maximal apparent magnitude of about 7.0 in the years 1890, 1902, 1920, 1944, 1966 and 2011. Evidence seems to indicate that T Pyxidis may have increased in mass despite the nova eruptions, and is now close to the Chandrasekhar limit when it might explode as a supernova. When a white dwarf reaches this limit it will collapse under its own weight and cause a Type Ia supernova.

== Effect on Earth ==
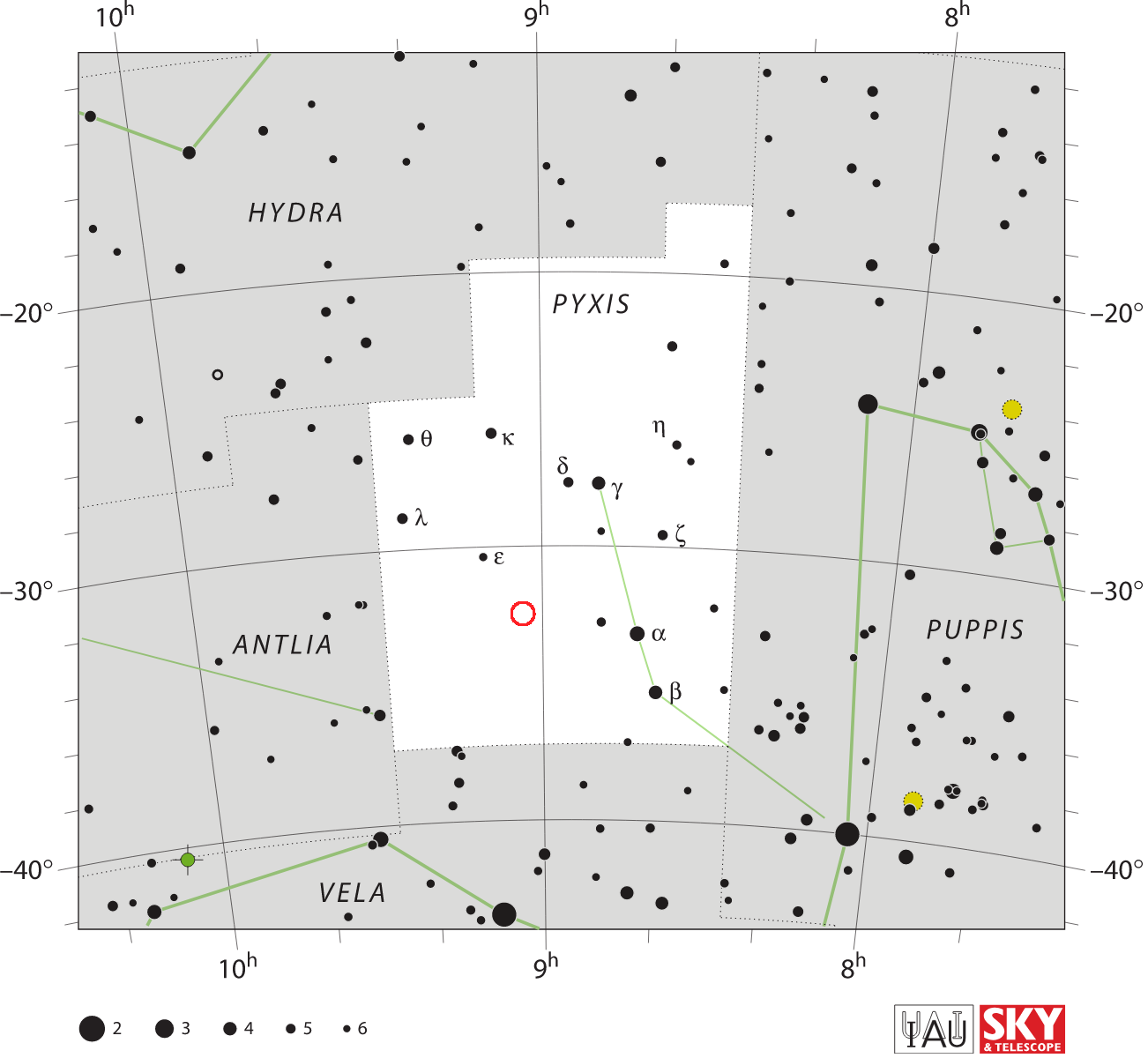
The location of T Pyxidis (circled in red)

Because of its relative proximity, some—in particular, Edward Sion, astronomer & astrophysicist at Villanova University, and his team therefrom—contend that a Type Ia supernova could have a significant impact on Earth. The received gamma radiation would equal the total (all spectra) radiation of approximately 1,000 solar flares, but the Type Ia supernova would have to be closer than 1,000 parsecs (3,300 light-years) to cause significant damage to the ozone layer, and perhaps closer than 500 parsecs. The X-radiation that reaches Earth in such an event, however, would be less than the X-radiation of a single average solar flare.

However, Sion's calculations were challenged by Alex Filippenko of the University of California at Berkeley who said that Sion had possibly miscalculated the damage that could be caused by a T Pyxidis supernova. He had used data for a far more deadly gamma-ray burst (GRB) occurring 1 kiloparsec from Earth, not a supernova, and T Pyxidis certainly is not expected to produce a GRB. According to another expert, "[a] supernova would have to be 10 times closer [to Earth] to do the damage described." Mankind survived when the radiation from the Crab Nebula supernova, at a distance of about 6,500 light-years, reached Earth in the year 1054. A Type Ia supernova at a distance of 3,300 light-years would have an apparent magnitude of around -9.3, about as bright as the brightest Iridium (satellite) flares.

Recent data indicates his distance estimate is five times too close. Astronomers used NASA's Hubble Space Telescope to observe the light emitted during its latest outburst in April 2011. The team also used the light echo to refine estimates of the nova's distance from Earth. The new distance is 15,600 light-years (4780 pc) from Earth. Previous estimates were between 6,500 and 16,000 light-years (2000 and 4900 pc).

It has been reported that T Pyx would "soon" become a supernova. However, when Scientific American contacted Sion, it became apparent that "soon" was meant in astronomical terms: Sion said that "soon" in the press announcement meant "[a]t the accretion rate we derived, the white dwarf in T Pyxidis will reach the Chandrasekhar Limit in ten million years." By that time it will have moved far enough away from the Solar System to have little effect.

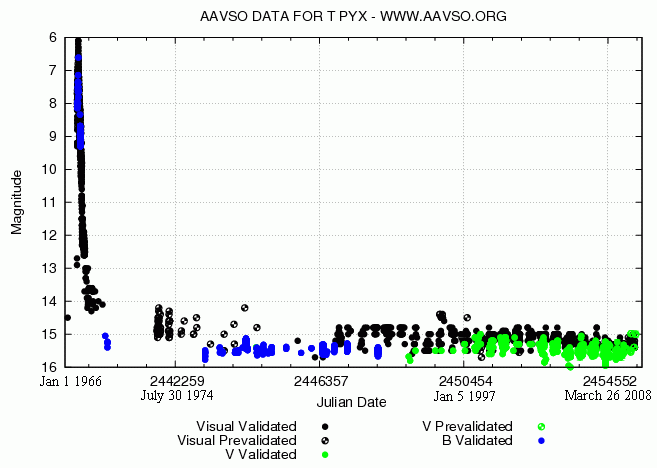
AAVSO light curve of recurrent nova T Pyx from 1 Jan 1966 to 17 Nov 2010. Up is brighter and down is fainter. Day numbers are Julian days. Different colors reflect different bandpasses.

== 2011 outburst ==
Mike Linnolt detected T Pyx's first outburst in nearly 45 years on April 14, 2011, at magnitude 13. According to AAVSO observers, it reached magnitude 7.5 in the visual and V bands by April 27, and reached magnitude 6.8 by May 3.

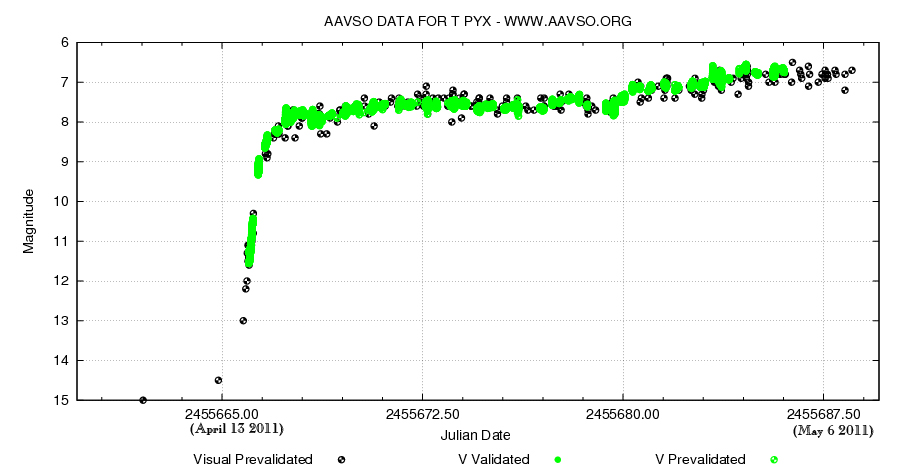
AAVSO light curve of recurrent nova T Pyx from April 13 to May 6, 2011. Up is brighter and down is fainter.

== X-ray source ==
T Pyxidis is a super soft X-ray source.
