= Eta Pyxidis =

White-hued main sequence star in the constellation Pyxis

- Location of η Pyxidis (circled)

Observation data Epoch J2000.0 Equinox J2000.0 (ICRS)
- Constellation: Pyxis
- Right ascension: 08^{h} 37^{m} 52.15248^{s}
- Declination: −26° 15′ 18.0063″
- Apparent magnitude (V): +5.27

Characteristics
- Evolutionary stage: main sequence
- Spectral type: A0 V
- B−V color index: −0.04

Astrometry
Radial velocity (R_{v})	31.0±4.2 km/s
Proper motion (μ)	RA: −24.49 mas/yr Dec.: −13.02 mas/yr
Parallax (π)	14.07±0.21 mas
Distance	232 ± 3 ly (71 ± 1 pc)
Absolute magnitude (M_{V})	+0.90

Details
Mass	2.51±0.01 M_{☉}
Luminosity	42 L_{☉}
Surface gravity (log g)	4.33 cgs
Temperature	11,614±395 K
Rotational velocity (v sin i)	238 km/s
Age	67 Myr

Other designations
- η Pyx, CPD−25°3792, FK5 2676, HD 73495, HIP 42334, HR 3420, SAO 176189, WDS J08379-2615A

Database references
SIMBAD	data

Eta Pyxidis (η Pyxidis) is a solitary, white-hued star in the southern constellation of Pyxis. It is faintly visible to the naked eye with an apparent visual magnitude of +5.27. Based upon an annual parallax shift of 14.07 mas as seen from Earth, this star is located around 232 light years from the Sun. At that distance, the visual magnitude of the star is diminished by an extinction factor of 0.07 due to interstellar dust.

This is an A-type main-sequence star with a stellar classification of A0 V. It is young with an age of around 67 million years and is spinning rapidly with a projected rotational velocity of 238 km/s. The star has 2.51 times the mass of the Sun and is radiating 42 times the Sun's luminosity from its photosphere at an effective temperature of around 11,614 K.
