= Theta Pyxidis =

Star in the constellation Pyxis

- Location of θ Pyxidis (circled)

Observation data Epoch J2000 Equinox J2000
- Constellation: Pyxis
- Right ascension: 09^{h} 21^{m} 29.60^{s}
- Declination: −25° 57′ 55.5″
- Apparent magnitude (V): 4.718

Characteristics
- Evolutionary stage: AGB
- Spectral type: M0.5 III Ba0.5
- U−B color index: +1.984
- B−V color index: +1.651
- Variable type: semiregular variable

Astrometry
Radial velocity (R_{v})	+20.0±2.8 km/s
Proper motion (μ)	RA: −12.24±0.40 mas/yr Dec.: −9.29±0.37 mas/yr
Parallax (π)	6.49±0.45 mas
Distance	500 ± 30 ly (150 ± 10 pc)
Absolute magnitude (M_{V})	−1.22

Details
Radius	54 R_{☉}
Luminosity	970 L_{☉}
Temperature	3,825 K

Other designations
- θ Pyx, Theta Pyx, CPD−25°4152, FK5 1243, GC 12916, HD 80874, HIP 45902, HR 3718, SAO 177322, PPM 256035

Database references
SIMBAD	data

Theta Pyxidis, Latinized from θ Pyxidis, is a red M-type giant in the constellation Pyxis. It is approximately 500 ± 30 light years from Earth. It is of spectral type M1III and semi-regular variable with two measured periods of 13 and 98.3 days, and an average visual magnitude of 4.71, It shines with a luminosity approximately 970 times that of the Sun and has a surface temperature of 3825 K. It has a diameter around 54 times that of the Sun.

Theta Pyxidis is moving through the Galaxy at a speed of 22.8 km/s relative to the Sun. Its projected Galactic orbit carries it between 21,200 and 24,700 light years from the center of the Galaxy. It came closest to the Sun 5.8 million years ago when it had brightened to magnitude 3.12 from a distance of 241 light years.
