= NGC 2613 =

Spiral galaxy in the constellation Pyxis

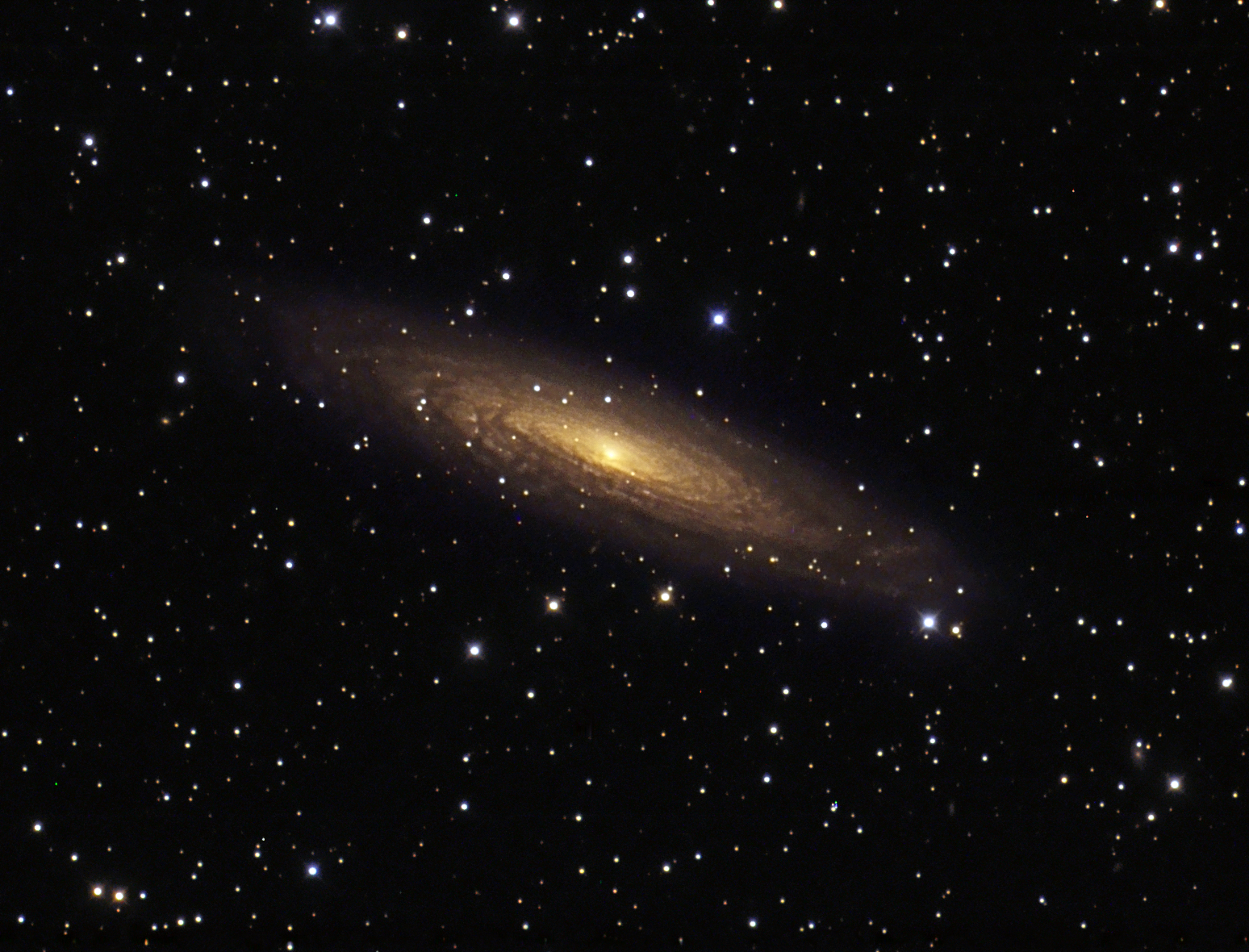
- NGC 2613 imaged by ESO's 1.5-metre Danish telescope

Observation data (J2000 epoch)
- Constellation: Pyxis
- Right ascension: 08^{h} 33^{m} 22.841^{s}
- Declination: −22° 58′ 25.21″
- Redshift: 0.005591
- Heliocentric radial velocity: 1,675 km/s
- Distance: 78 Mly (24 Mpc)
- Apparent magnitude (V): 11.6

Characteristics
- Type: SA(s)b
- Mass: (7.50±0.87)×10^{11} M_{☉}. M_{☉}
- Size: 59.56 kiloparsecs (194,200 light-years) (diameter; 25.0 mag/arcsec^{2} B-band isophote)
- Apparent size (V): 7.59′ × 1.70′
- Notable features: Edge-on galaxy

Other designations
- ESO 495- G 018, IRAS 08311-2248, UGCA 141, MCG -04-21-003, PGC 23997

NGC 2613 is a spiral galaxy in the southern constellation of Pyxis, next to the western constellation border with Puppis. It was discovered by the German-born astronomer William Herschel on November 20, 1784. With an apparent visual magnitude of 10.5, the galaxy is faintly visible using a telescope with a 100 mm (4 in) aperture. It appears spindle-shaped as it is almost edge-on to observers on Earth.

The morphological classification of NGC 2613 is SA(s)b, indicating a spiral galaxy with no bar or ring, and moderately tightly wound spiral arms. It is inclined by an angle of approximately 79° to the line of sight from the Earth and is oriented with the long axis along a position angle of 133°. The radius of neutral hydrogen in the galaxy is about 35 kpc, and the mass of the neutral hydrogen is (8.73±0.32)×10^{9} M_{☉}. The galaxy has a combined dynamic mass of (7.50±0.87)×10^{11} M_{☉}.

NGC 2613 has an active galactic nucleus that is deeply embedded in obscuring gas and dust. Emission data collected by the Very Large Array shows a feature resembling a tidal tail along the southeast side of the galaxy, which was most likely produced by an interaction with the small companion galaxy, ESO 495-G017, now located to the northwest of NGC 2613.

One supernova has been observed in NGC 2613. SN 2023dtc (Type Ib, mag. 18.604) was discovered by ATLAS on 20 March 2023.

== See also ==
- List of NGC objects (2001–3000)
