= AK Pyxidis =

Star in the constellation Pyxis

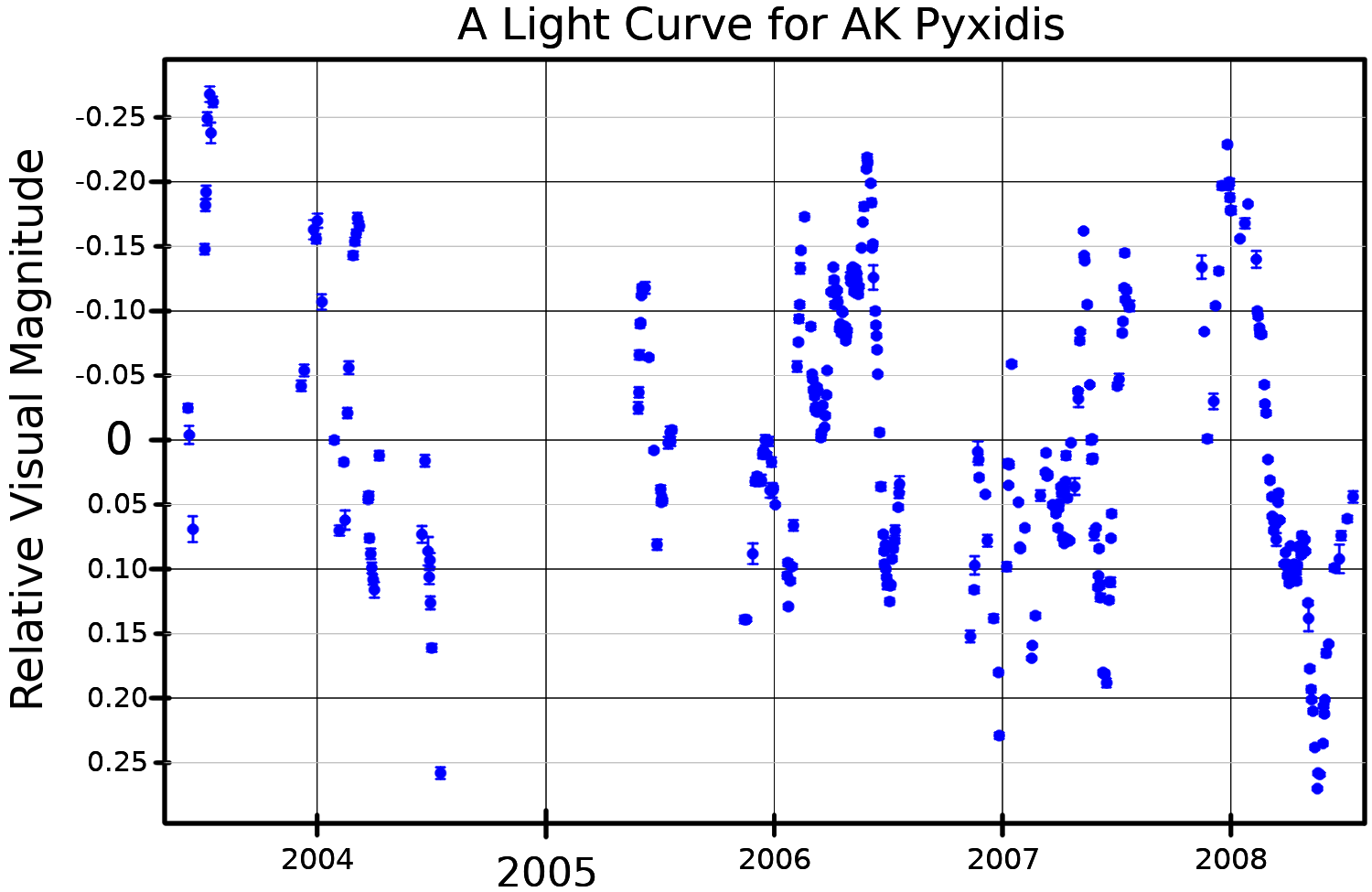
- A visual band light curve for AK Pyxidis, plotted from data published by Tabur et al. (2009)

Observation data Epoch J2000 Equinox ICRS
- Constellation: Pyxis
- Right ascension: 08^{h} 48^{m} 14.62631^{s}
- Declination: −28° 38′ 19.6757″
- Apparent magnitude (V): 6.09-6.51

Characteristics
- Spectral type: M5III
- Variable type: semiregular variable

Astrometry
Proper motion (μ)	RA: −10.60±0.29 mas/yr Dec.: −8.05±0.29 mas/yr
Parallax (π)	4.68±0.41 mas
Distance	700 ± 60 ly (210 ± 20 pc)

Details
Mass	3.97 M_{☉}
Radius	112 R_{☉}
Luminosity	1,379 L_{☉}
Surface gravity (log g)	1.64 cgs
Temperature	3,333 K
Metallicity [Fe/H]	−0.41 dex

Other designations
- AK Pyxidis, CD−61°1428, HD 75306, HIP 43215, SAO 176496

Database references
SIMBAD	data

AK Pyxidis is a semiregular variable star located in the constellation Pyxis. It varies between magnitudes 6.09 and 6.51, making it very faintly visible to the naked eye under excellent dark sky conditions. It has been found to pulsate with periods of 55.5, 57.9, 86.7, 162.9 and 232.6 days simultaneously. Located around 1228 light-years distant, it shines with a luminosity approximately 1,400 times that of the Sun and has a surface temperature of 3,333 K.

The variability of AK Pyxidis was discovered during the analysis of the Hipparcos satellite data. It was given the variable star designation AK Pyxidis in 1999.
