= Pyxis =

Constellation in the southern celestial hemisphere

- Constellation
- List of stars in Pyxis
- Abbreviation: Pyx
- Genitive: Pyxidis
- Pronunciation: /ˈpɪksɪs/, genitive /ˈpɪksɪdɪs/
- Symbolism: The compass box
- Right ascension: 9^{h}
- Declination: −30°
- Quadrant: SQ2
- Area: 221 sq. deg. (65th)
- Main stars: 3
- Bayer/Flamsteed stars: 10
- Stars brighter than 3.00^{m}: 0
- Stars within 10.00 pc (32.62 ly): 1
- Brightest star: α Pyx (3.68^{m})
- Nearest star: Gliese 318
- Messier objects: 0
- Bordering constellations: Hydra; Puppis; Vela; Antlia
- Visible at latitudes between +50° and −90°. Best visible at 21:00 (9 p.m.) during the month of March.

Pyxis (Note: Pronounced /ˈpɪksɪs/; Greek and Latin for box.) is a small and faint constellation in the southern sky. Abbreviated from Pyxis Nautica, its name is Latin for a mariner's compass (contrasting with Circinus, which represents a draftsman's compasses). Pyxis was introduced by Nicolas-Louis de Lacaille in the 18th century, and is counted among the 88 modern constellations.

The plane of the Milky Way passes through Pyxis. A faint constellation, its three brightest stars—Alpha, Beta and Gamma Pyxidis—are in a rough line. At magnitude 3.68, Alpha is the constellation's brightest star. It is a blue-white star approximately 880 light-years (270 parsecs) distant and around 22,000 times as luminous as the Sun.

Pyxis is located close to the stars that formed the old constellation Argo Navis, the ship of Jason and the Argonauts. Parts of Argo Navis were Carina (the keel or hull), Puppis (the stern), and Vela (the sails). These eventually became their own constellations. In the 19th century, John Herschel suggested renaming Pyxis to Malus (meaning the mast) but the suggestion was not followed.

T Pyxidis, located about 4 degrees northeast of Alpha Pyxidis, is a recurrent nova that has flared up to magnitude 7 every few decades. Also, three star systems in Pyxis have confirmed exoplanets. The Pyxis globular cluster is situated about 130,000 light-years away in the galactic halo. This region was not thought to contain globular clusters. The possibility has been raised that this object might have escaped from the Large Magellanic Cloud.

== History ==
Pyxis is positioned just south of the star Alphard in the constellation Hydra midway between Virgo and Cancer. Although it is completely visible from latitudes south of 53 degrees north, its best evening-sky visibility is during February and March in the southern hemisphere.

In ancient Chinese astronomy, Alpha, Beta, and Gamma Pyxidis formed part of Tianmiao, a celestial temple honouring the ancestors of the emperor, along with stars from neighbouring Antlia.

The French astronomer Nicolas-Louis de Lacaille first described the constellation in French as la Boussole (the Marine Compass) in 1752, after he had observed and catalogued almost 10,000 southern stars during a two-year stay at the Cape of Good Hope. He devised fourteen new constellations in uncharted regions of the Southern Celestial Hemisphere not visible from Europe. All but one honoured instruments that symbolised the Age of Enlightenment. (Note: The exception is Mensa, named for the Table Mountain. The other thirteen (alongside Pyxis) are Antlia, Caelum, Circinus, Fornax, Horologium, Microscopium, Norma, Octans, Pictor, Reticulum, Sculptor, and Telescopium.) Lacaille Latinised the name to Pixis [sic] Nautica on his 1763 chart. The Ancient Greeks identified the four main stars of Pyxis as the mast of the mythological Jason's ship, Argo Navis.

German astronomer Johann Bode defined the constellation Lochium Funis, the Log and Line—a nautical device once used for measuring speed and distance travelled at sea—around Pyxis in his 1801 star atlas, but the depiction did not survive. In 1844 John Herschel attempted to resurrect the classical configuration of Argo Navis by renaming it Malus the Mast, a suggestion followed by Francis Baily, but Benjamin Gould restored Lacaille's nomenclature. For instance, Alpha Pyxidis is referenced as α Mali in an old catalog of the United States Naval Observatory (star 3766, page 97).

== Characteristics ==
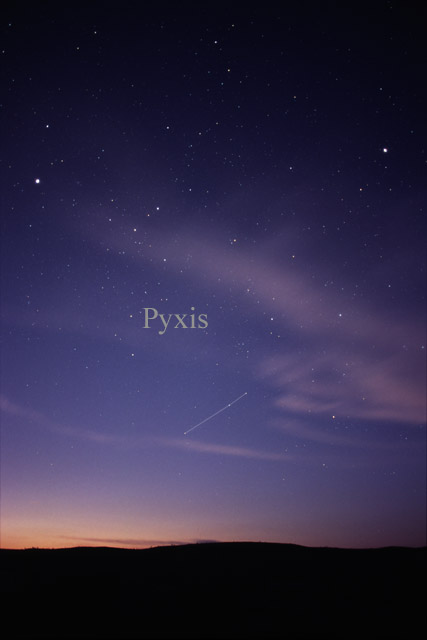
The constellation of Pyxis, the compass, as it can be seen by the naked eye

Covering 220.8 square degrees and hence 0.535% of the sky, Pyxis ranks 65th of the 88 modern constellations by area. Its position in the Southern Celestial Hemisphere means that the whole constellation is visible to observers south of 52°N. (Note: While parts of the constellation technically rise above the horizon to observers between the latitudes of 52°N and 72°N, stars within a few degrees of the horizon are to all intents and purposes unobservable.) It is most visible in the evening sky in February and March. A small constellation, it is bordered by Hydra to the north, Puppis to the west, Vela to the south, and Antlia to the east. The three-letter abbreviation for the constellation, as adopted by the International Astronomical Union in 1922, is "Pyx". The official constellation boundaries, as set by Belgian astronomer Eugène Delporte in 1930, are defined by a polygon of eight sides (illustrated in infobox). In the equatorial coordinate system, the right ascension coordinates of these borders lie between 8^{h} 27.7^{m} and 9^{h} 27.6^{m} , while the declination coordinates are between −17.41° and −37.29°.

== Features ==
=== Stars ===
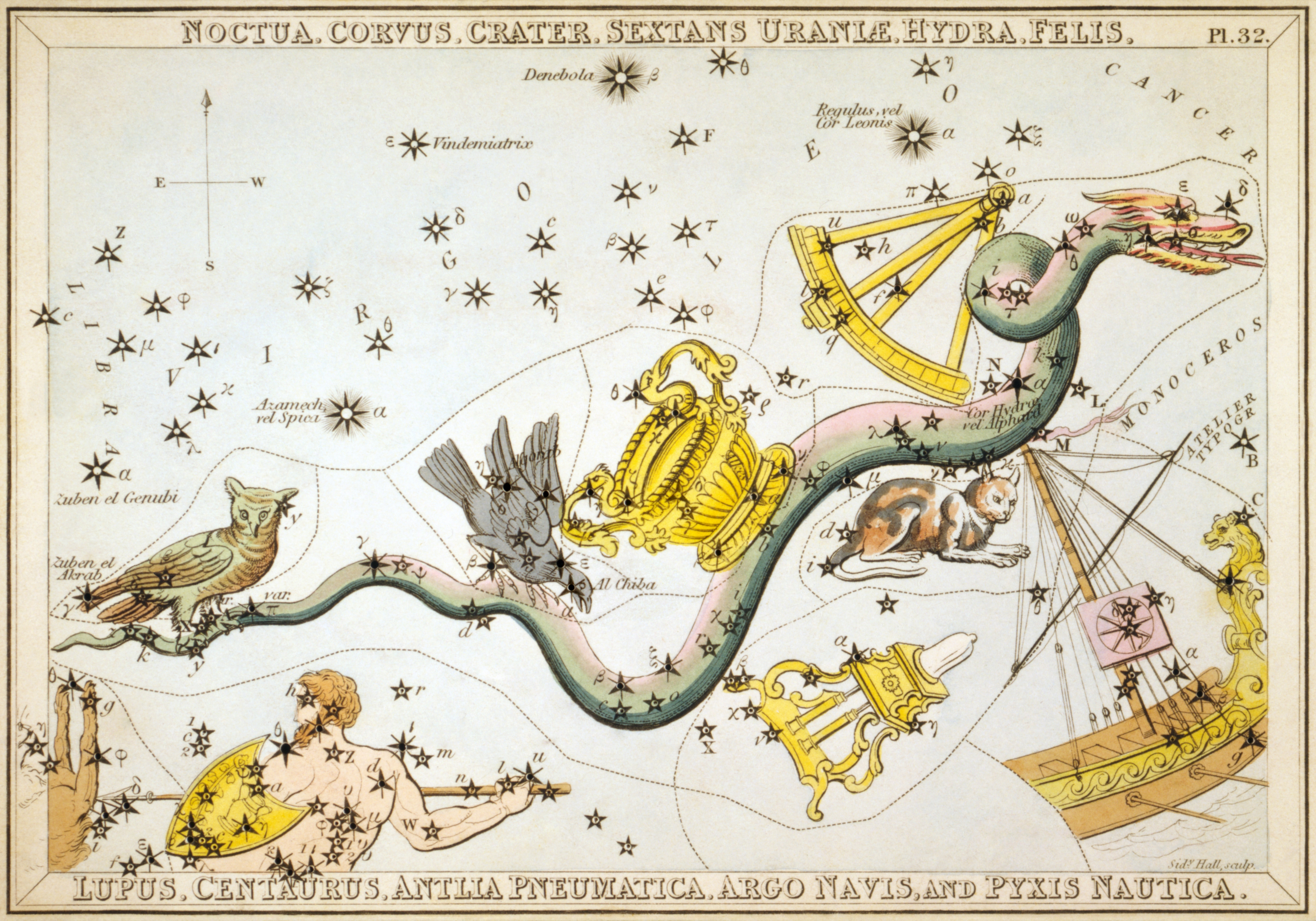
Pyxis can be seen overlying the mast of Argo Navis

Lacaille gave Bayer designations to ten stars now named Alpha to Lambda Pyxidis, skipping the Greek letters iota and kappa. Although a nautical element, the constellation was not an integral part of the old Argo Navis and hence did not share in the original Bayer designations of that constellation, which were split between Carina, Vela and Puppis. Pyxis is a faint constellation, its three brightest stars—Alpha, Beta and Gamma Pyxidis—forming a rough line. Overall, there are 41 stars within the constellation's borders with apparent magnitudes brighter than or equal to 6.5. (Note: Objects of magnitude 6.5 are among the faintest visible to the unaided eye in suburban-rural transition night skies.)

With an apparent magnitude of 3.68, Alpha Pyxidis is the brightest star in the constellation. Located 880 ± 30 light-years distant from Earth, it is a blue-white giant star of spectral type B1.5III that is around 22,000 times as luminous as the Sun and has 9.4 ± 0.7 times its diameter. It began life with a mass 12.1 ± 0.6 times that of the Sun, almost 15 million years ago. Its light is dimmed by 30% due to interstellar dust, so would have a brighter magnitude of 3.31 if not for this. The second brightest star at magnitude 3.97 is Beta Pyxidis, a yellow bright giant or supergiant of spectral type G7Ib-II that is around 435 times as luminous as the Sun, lying 420 ± 10 light-years distant away from Earth. It has a companion star of magnitude 12.5 separated by 9 arcseconds. Gamma Pyxidis is a star of magnitude 4.02 that lies 207 ± 2 light-years distant. It is an orange giant of spectral type K3III that has cooled and swollen to 3.7 times the diameter of the Sun after exhausting its core hydrogen.

Kappa Pyxidis was catalogued but not given a Bayer designation by Lacaille, but Gould felt the star was bright enough to warrant a letter. Kappa has a magnitude of 4.62 and is 560 ± 50 light-years distant. An orange giant of spectral type K4/K5III, Kappa has a luminosity approximately 965 times that of the Sun. It is separated by 2.1 arcseconds from a magnitude 10 star. Theta Pyxidis is a red giant of spectral type M1III and semi-regular variable with two measured periods of 13 and 98.3 days, and an average magnitude of 4.71, and is 500 ± 30 light-years distant from Earth. It has expanded to approximately 54 times the diameter of the Sun.

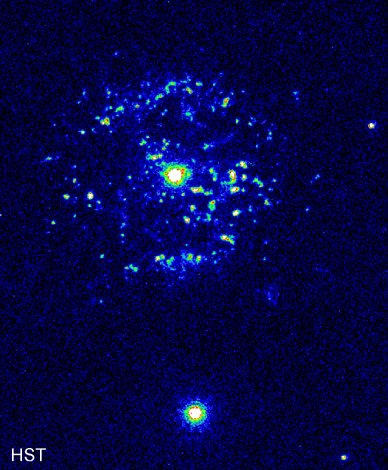
Hubble Space Telescope picture of T Pyxidis, showing ejected material from past eruptions

Located around 4 degrees northeast of Alpha is T Pyxidis, a binary star system composed of a white dwarf with around 0.8 times the Sun's mass and a red dwarf that orbit each other every 1.8 hours. This system is located around 15,500 light-years away from Earth. A recurrent nova, it has brightened to the 7th magnitude in the years 1890, 1902, 1920, 1944, 1966 and 2011 from a baseline of around 14th magnitude. These outbursts are thought to be due to the white dwarf accreting material from its companion and ejecting periodically.

TY Pyxidis is an eclipsing binary star whose apparent magnitude ranges from 6.85 to 7.5 over 3.2 days. The two components are both of spectral type G5IV with a diameter 2.2 times, and mass 1.2 times that of the Sun, and revolve around each other every 3.2 days. The system is classified as a RS Canum Venaticorum variable, a binary system with prominent starspot activity, and lies 184 ± 5 light-years away. The system emits X-rays, and analysing the emission curve over time led researchers to conclude that there was a loop of material arcing between the two stars. RZ Pyxidis is another eclipsing binary system, made up of two young stars less than 200,000 years old. Both are hot blue-white stars of spectral type B7V and are around 2.5 times the size of the Sun. One is around five times as luminous as the Sun and the other around four times as luminous. The system is classified as a Beta Lyrae variable, the apparent magnitude varying from 8.83 to 9.72 over 0.66 days. XX Pyxidis is one of the more-studied members of a class of stars known as Delta Scuti variables—short period (six hours at most) pulsating stars that have been used as standard candles and as subjects to study astroseismology. Astronomers made more sense of its pulsations when it became clear that it is also a binary star system. The main star is a white main sequence star of spectral type A4V that is around 1.85 ± 0.05 times as massive as the Sun. Its companion is most likely a red dwarf of spectral type M3V, around 0.3 times as massive as the Sun. The two are very close—possibly only 3 times the diameter of the Sun between them—and orbit each other every 1.15 days. The brighter star is deformed into an egg shape.

AK Pyxidis is a red giant of spectral type M5III and semi-regular variable that varies between magnitudes 6.09 and 6.51. Its pulsations take place over multiple periods simultaneously of 55.5, 57.9, 86.7, 162.9 and 232.6 days. UZ Pyxidis is another semi-regular variable red giant, this time a carbon star, that is around 3560 times as luminous as the Sun with a surface temperature of 3482 K, located 2116 light-years away from Earth. It varies between magnitudes 6.99 and 7.83 over 159 days. VY Pyxidis is a BL Herculis variable (type II Cepheid), ranging between apparent magnitudes 7.13 and 7.40 over a period of 1.24 days. Located around 650 light-years distant, it shines with a luminosity approximately 45 times that of the Sun.

The closest star to Earth in the constellation is Gliese 318, a white dwarf of spectral class DA5 and magnitude 11.85. Its distance has been calculated to be 26 light-years, or 28.7 ± 0.5 light-years distant from Earth. It has around 45% of the Sun's mass, yet only 0.15% of its luminosity. WISEPC J083641.12-185947.2 is a brown dwarf of spectral type T8p located around 72 light-years from Earth. Discovered by infrared astronomy in 2011, it has a magnitude of 18.79.

=== Planetary systems ===
Pyxis is home to three stars with confirmed planetary systems—all discovered by Doppler spectroscopy. A hot Jupiter, HD 73256 b, that orbits HD 73256 every 2.55 days, was discovered using the CORALIE spectrograph in 2003. The host star is a yellow star of spectral type G9V that has 69% of our Sun's luminosity, 89% of its diameter and 105% of its mass. Around 119 light-years away, it shines with an apparent magnitude of 8.08 and is around a billion years old. HD 73267 b was discovered with the High Accuracy Radial Velocity Planet Searcher (HARPS) in 2008. It orbits HD 73267 every 1260 days, a 7 billion-year-old star of spectral type G5V that is around 89% as massive as the Sun. A red dwarf of spectral type M2.5V that has around 42% the Sun's mass, Gliese 317 is orbited by two gas giant planets. Around 50 light-years distant from Earth, it is a good candidate for future searches for more terrestrial rocky planets.

=== Deep-sky objects ===
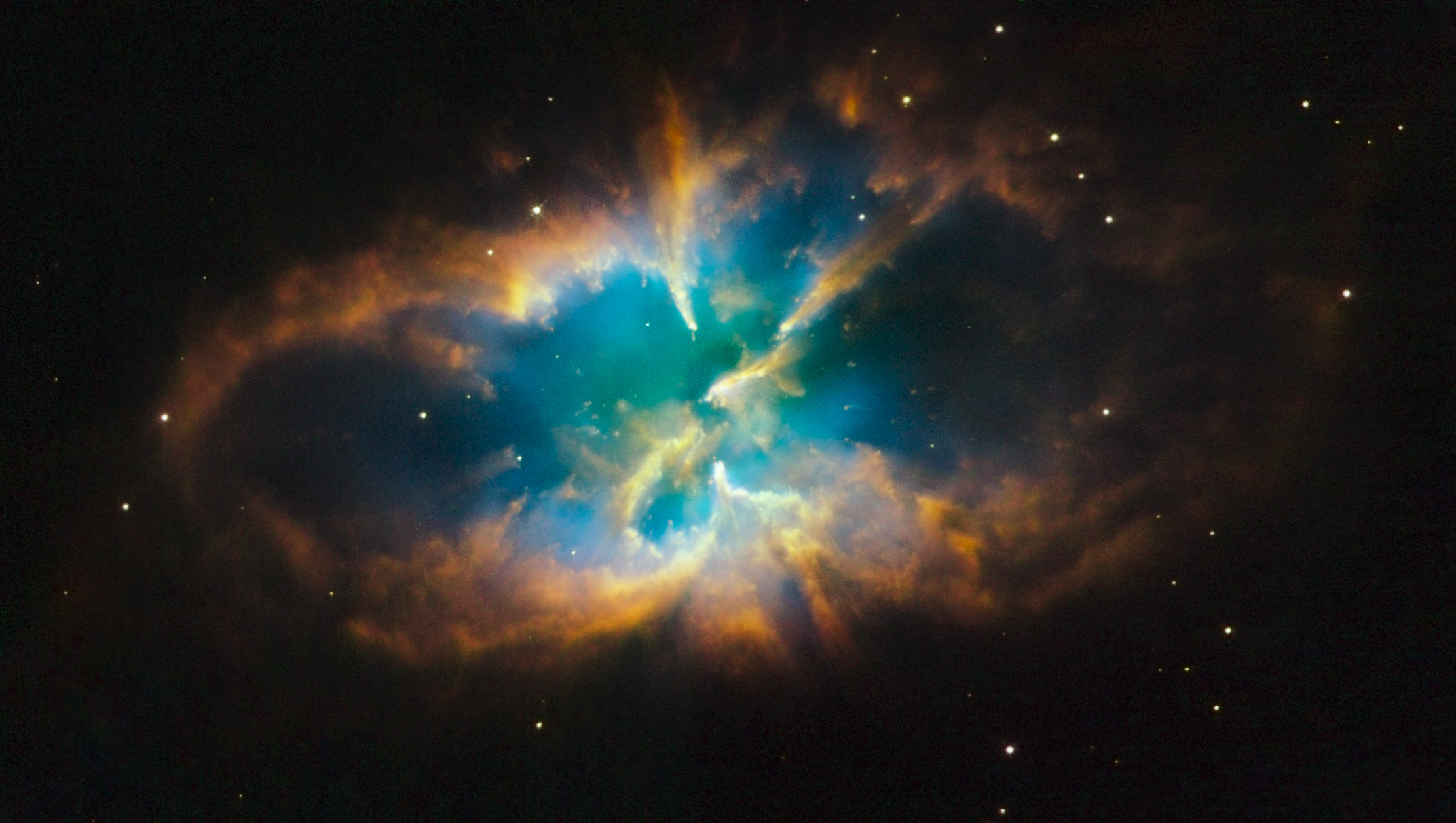
The planetary nebula NGC 2818, imaged by the Hubble telescope

Pyxis lies in the plane of the Milky Way, although part of the eastern edge is dark, with material obscuring our galaxy arm there. NGC 2818 is a planetary nebula that lies within a dim open cluster of magnitude 8.2. NGC 2818A is an open cluster that lies on line of sight with it. K 1-2 is a planetary nebula whose central star is a spectroscopic binary composed of two stars in close orbit with jets emanating from the system. The surface temperature of one component has been estimated at as high as 85,000 K. NGC 2627 is an open cluster of magnitude 8.4 that is visible in binoculars.

Discovered in 1995, the Pyxis globular cluster is a 13.3 ± 1.3 billion year-old globular cluster situated around 130,000 light-years distant from Earth and around 133,000 light-years distant from the centre of the Milky Way—a region not previously thought to contain globular clusters. Located in the galactic halo, it was noted to lie on the same plane as the Large Magellanic Cloud and the possibility has been raised that it might be an escaped object from that galaxy.

NGC 2613 is a spiral galaxy of magnitude 10.5 which appears spindle-shaped as it is almost edge-on to observers on Earth. Henize 2-10 is a dwarf galaxy which lies 30 million light-years away. It has a black hole of around a million solar masses at its centre. Known as a starburst galaxy due to very high rates of star formation, it has a bluish colour due to the huge numbers of young stars within it.

== See also ==
- Pyxis (Chinese astronomy)
