= List of blue straggler stars =

This is a list of blue straggler stars in order of their distance from Earth.

== List ==
=== Blue straggler stars (confirmed) ===
Star system	Median distance (ly)	RA DEC	Stars in system	Spectral type	Apparent magnitude (V)	Cluster/Nebula	Formation Mechanism	Notes
Alpha Fornacis Ba (Dalim)	45.66 ± 0.08	03^{h} 12^{m} 04.5298^{s} −28° 59′ 15.439″	3	F6V + G7V + D	3.85	No	Mass Transfer	The closest known blue straggler star to Earth
HD 65907	52.8	07^{h} 57^{m} 46.9^{s} −60° 18′ 11″	3	F9.5V				
HR 3220 (B Carinae)	58.9 ± 0.6	08^{h} 09^{m} 00.56958^{s} −61° 18′ 08.5836″	2	F6 V Fe-0.8 CH-0.4 + D	4.75		Mass Transfer	
HD 128429	87.7 ± 0.9	14^{h} 36^{m} 59.79592s^{s} −12° 18′ 19.0687″	2	F6V + D	6.197±0.005		Mass Transfer	
Regulus Aa	89.3±0.7	10^{h} 08^{m} 22.311^{s} +11° 58′ 01.95″	4	B8 IV + WD + K2 V +M4 V	1.40		Mass Transfer	Brightest known blue straggler to Earth
19 Aquarii	260 ± 3	21^{h} 25^{m} 13.01629^{s} −09° 44′ 54.7923″	1	A8V	5.713			
SX Phoenicis	272 ± 1	23^{h} 46^{m} 32.89291^{s} −41° 34′ 54.7708″	1	A2 V	6.76 – 7.53			
V518 Carinae (HR 4196)	450 ± 10		1	B3/5V	4.82			
Theta Carinae	460 ± 10		1	B0.5 Vp	2.76			Part of IC 2602 open cluster
HD 136179	489	15^{h} 19^{m} 48.18597^{s} −20° 52′ 17.0439″	1	F3V	8.42			
SU Crateris	555		1	F8V				
BD−12°2669	570		2	A5				
40 Cancri	626 ± 9		1	A1 V	6.61			
V957 Scorpii	890 ± 40		1	B5 IIIp				
HD 89890	1,200 ± 100		4	B3 III + A0 IVpSi + A2 + K0 III	4.50			
DY Pegasi	1,330 ± 20		1	A3 to F1	9.95 – 10.62			
HD 214539	1,421		1	B8/9Ib				
HD 224927	1,180		1	A9V				
2M0056–08	2,175 ± 29		3	? + ?				Red straggler binary
WOCS 9005	2,600–2,900		2	F + W		Messier 67 (King Cobra/Golden Eye Cluster)		
31 Crateris (TY Corvi)	3,000		2	B1.5V + ?	5.19-5.23			
HD 87266	3,245		1	B3		NGC 3114		
KIC 11145123	3,910 ± 50		1	F7V	13.12			
HD 93521	5,000 ± 300		1	O9.5IIInn or O9.5Vp	7.03			
BD+43 3654	5,400 ± 300		1	O4If	10.06			
Gaia DR3 2893941099963718528	11,900	06^{h} 29^{m} 31.11^{s} −31° 20′ 59.5″	1	A3V				
M10-VLA1	14,000		1	?		Messier 10		Red straggler
BSS 19	14,500 ± 32.6		1	BSS		47 Tucanae		
NJL 220	15,800 ± 1.1		1	BSS		Omega Centauri		
HE 0437-5439 (HVS3)	200,000		1	BV or sdB+F	16.42			

=== Blue straggler stars (candidate/former) ===
Star system	Median distance (ly)	Stars in system	Spectral type	Apparent magnitude (V)	Comments and references
HD 159062	70.619 ± 0.006	1	G9V Fe−0.8	7.305	
HD 22413	245	1	A9V		

== See also ==
- List of luminous blue variable stars
