= AE Ursae Majoris =

Variable star in the constellation Ursa Major

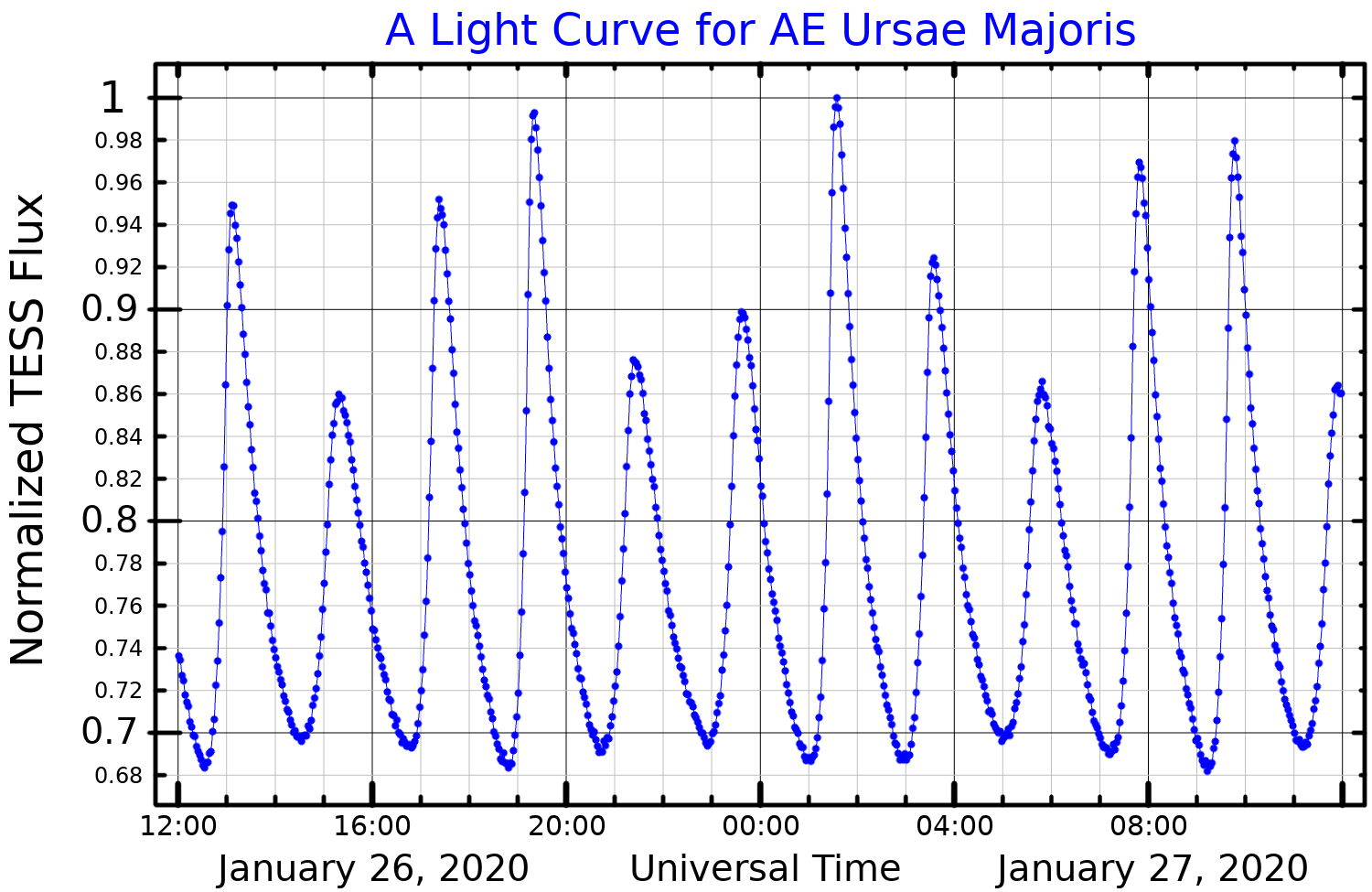
- A light curve for AE Ursae Majoris, plotted from TESS data

Observation data Epoch J2000 Equinox J2000
- Constellation: Ursa Major
- Right ascension: 09^{h} 36^{m} 53.155^{s}
- Declination: +44° 04′ 00.40″
- Apparent magnitude (V): 10.86 to 11.52

Characteristics
- Evolutionary stage: subgiant
- Spectral type: A9
- Variable type: SX Phe(?)

Astrometry
Radial velocity (R_{v})	150±27 km/s
Proper motion (μ)	RA: −15.755 mas/yr Dec.: −12.650 mas/yr
Parallax (π)	1.3593±0.0332 mas
Distance	2,400 ± 60 ly (740 ± 20 pc)

Details
Mass	1.805±0.055 M_{☉}
Radius	2.367±0.046 R_{☉}
Luminosity	24.0^{+2.8}_{−2.5} L_{☉}
Surface gravity (log g)	3.9543±0.0044 cgs
Temperature	8,357^{+195}_{−190} K
Metallicity [Fe/H]	−0.32±0.23 dex
Age	1.055±0.095 Gyr

Other designations
- AE UMa, HIP 47181, 2MASS J09365316+4404004

Database references
SIMBAD	data

AE Ursae Majoris is a star in the northern circumpolar constellation of Ursa Major, abbreviated AE UMa. It is a variable star that ranges in brightness from a peak apparent visual magnitude of 10.86 down to 11.52. The distance to this star is approximately 2,400 light years based on parallax measurements.

The variability of this star was announced by E. Geyer and associates in 1955. V. P. Tsesevich in 1973 found it to be a dwarf cepheid with a period of 0.086017 days, and he noticed it showed amplitude variations in the light curve. In 1974, B. Szeidl determined a secondary period of 0.066529 days, while P. Broglia and P. Conconi found a beat period of 0.294 days. It belonged to a group of high amplitude, double mode Delta Scuti variables that included SX Phoenicis, and by 1995 it was classified as a SX Phoenicis variable and a possible halo object. However, E. Hintz and associates in 1997 found strong evidence against this classification.

In 2001, the overtone pulsation period of this star was shown to change at the rate of −7.3×10^{−8} y^{−1}. In addition, possible sudden jumps in the period have been observed, a property it has in common with VZ Cancri. With an estimated mass 1.8 times that of the Sun and an age of a billion years, it is an evolved star that has left the main sequence and is generating energy on a hydrogen-burning shell surrounding a helium core. The metallicity suggests it is a population I Delta Scuti variable. Currently it is crossing the Hertzsprung gap.
