= NGC 1786 =

Globular cluster in the constellation Dorado

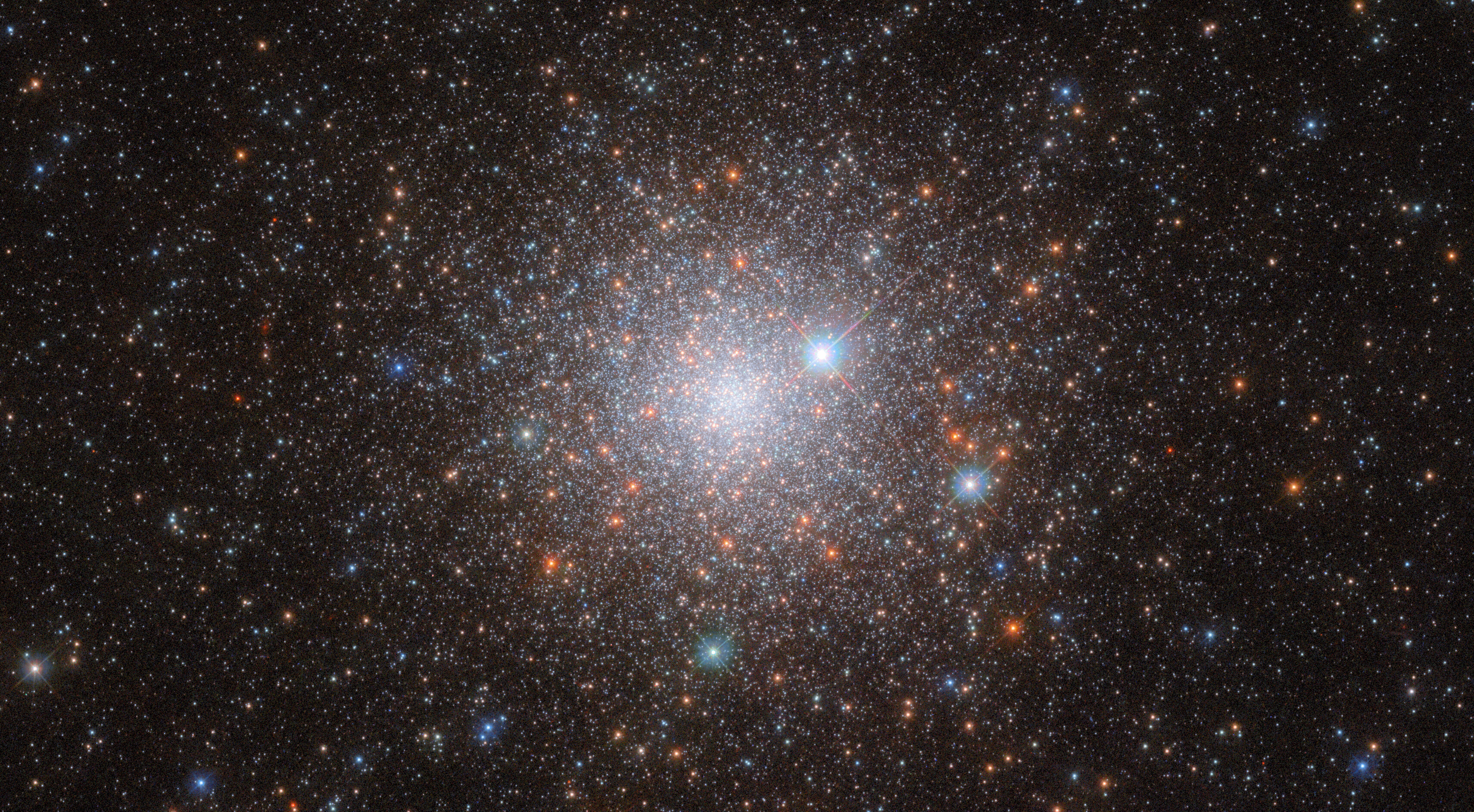
- NGC 1786 imaged by the Hubble Space Telescope

Observation data (J2000 epoch)
- Class: II
- Constellation: Dorado
- Right ascension: 04^{h} 59^{m} 07.8150^{s}
- Declination: –67° 44′ 42.804″
- Distance: 160,000 ly (49,000 pc)
- Apparent magnitude (V): 10.9
- Apparent dimensions (V): 1.6′

Physical characteristics
- Other designations: ESO 056-SC 039

NGC 1786 is a globular cluster in the constellation Dorado, located in the Large Magellanic Cloud. It was discovered by British astronomer John Herschel on 20 December 1835.

NGC 1786 has 65 variable stars that have been identified. Among them are 53 RR Lyrae variables, along with 3 classical Cepheids, a single Type II Cepheid, 1 anomalous Cepheid, 2 eclipsing binary systems, 3 Delta Scuti/SX Phoenicis variables, and 2 stars with unidentified variability classifications.

== See also ==
- List of NGC objects (1001–2000)
