= DY Pegasi =

Star in the constellation Pegasus

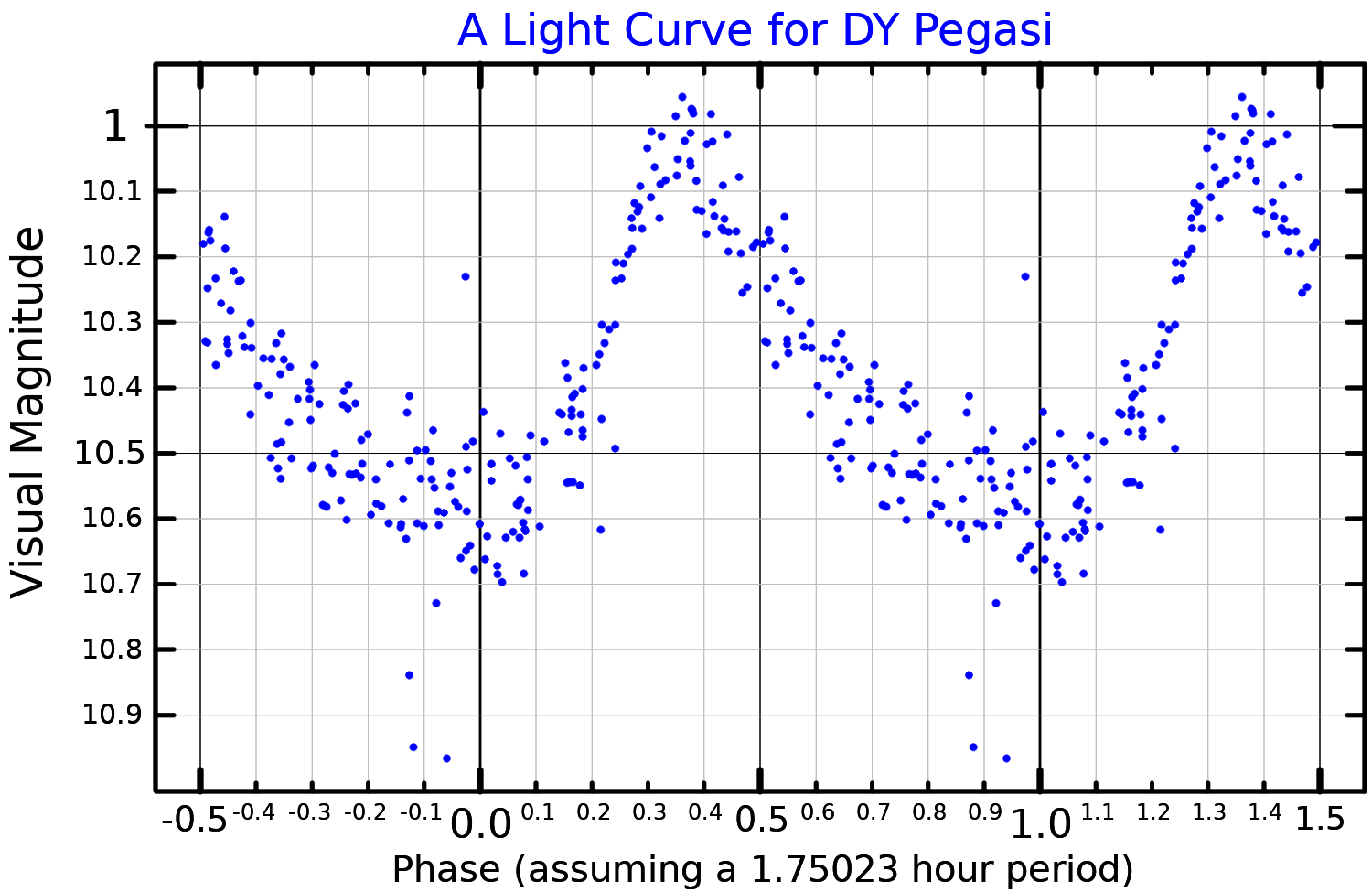
- A visual band light curve DY Pegasi, plotted from ASAS-SN data

Observation data Epoch J2000 Equinox J2000
- Constellation: Pegasus
- Right ascension: 23^{h} 08^{m} 51.186^{s}
- Declination: +17° 12′ 56.00″
- Apparent magnitude (V): 9.95 – 10.62

Characteristics
- Spectral type: A3 to F1
- Variable type: SX Phe

Astrometry
Radial velocity (R_{v})	−25.30±2.7 km/s
Proper motion (μ)	RA: 47.248 mas/yr Dec.: −22.103 mas/yr
Parallax (π)	2.4588±0.0452 mas
Distance	1,330 ± 20 ly (407 ± 7 pc)
Absolute magnitude (M_{V})	2.34; 0.84

Orbit
Period (P)	15,425.0±205.7 d
Semi-major axis (a)	≥ 0.254±0.034 AU
Eccentricity (e)	0.65 ± 0.10
Periastron epoch (T)	2438276.86149 ± 0.00013 HJD

Details
Mass	1.54 M_{☉} 1.40 M_{☉}
Radius	2.09±0.25 R_{☉} 3.74 – 3.95 R_{☉}
Luminosity	11.34+2.82 −2.51 L_{☉} 34.6±2.1 L_{☉}
Temperature	7,660 K (7,950 – 6,750) K
Metallicity [Fe/H]	−0.56 dex
Rotational velocity (v sin i)	23.6 km/s
Age	1.7 Gyr

Other designations
- DY Peg, BD+16°4877, HD 218549, HIP 114290

Database references
SIMBAD	data

DY Pegasi, abbreviated DY Peg, is a binary star system in the northern constellation of Pegasus. It is a well-studied SX Phoenicis variable star with a brightness that ranges from an apparent visual magnitude of 9.95 down to 10.62 with a period of 1.75 hours. This system is much too faint to be seen with the naked eye, but can be viewed with large binoculars or a telescope. Based on its high space motion and low abundances of heavier elements, it is a population II star system.

== Observation history ==
The variability of this star was first reported by Otto Morgenroth in 1934, and the first light curves of its photometric behavior were constructed by A. V. Soloviev in 1938. This curve showed a rapid increase of 0.7 in magnitude followed by a slower decline. It was found to be an intrinsic variable with an "ultra-short" period of 105 minutes. The 'b-v' color index of the star was found to vary with each cycle, corresponding to a change in spectral type from A7 at maximum to F1 at minimum. Direct observation of spectra showed a variation from A3 to A9. Evidence was found of small variations in the light curve between each cycle.

By 1972, it was widely regarded as a dwarf cepheid; a Delta Scuti variable. However, some astronomers classed it as a short-period RR_{s} Lyrae variable. Photometric observations of DY Peg in 1975 by E. H. Geyer and M. Hoffman showed non-periodic changes to the light curve that suggested an overtone pulsation. A frequency analysis of observations made by A. Masani and P. Broglia in 1953 strengthened the evidence that DY Peg is a double mode cepheid, showing a fundamental pulsation and a weaker first overtone with a period ratio of 0.764. By 1982, similarities with SX Phoenicis had been found, with both showing comparable drifts in their beat periods. Application of the Baade-Wesselink method provided a preliminary distance estimate to DY Peg of 820 ly (250 pc).

In 2003, J. N. Fu and C. Sterken suggested that much of the long-term trend in variability period changes could be explained by a highly-eccentric orbital model, although it was not deemed a complete solution since some small residuals remained from the period 1930–1950. They computed a preliminary orbital period of 52.5±0.3 years with an eccentricity of 0.77±0.01. L.-J. Li and S.-B. Qian in 2010 found a mass estimate of the secondary in the range of 0.028 to 0.173 M_{☉}, which suggests the companion may be a brown dwarf.

== Properties ==
A 2020 analysis of data collected by the AAVSO found three independent frequencies in the variability of the visible component. The primary and secondary modes are radial pulsations with 13.71249 and 17.7000 cycles per day, respectively, while a newly discovered non-radial mode has a frequency of 18.138 cycles per day. Consistent with being a population II star, it has a low metallicity. The stellar class ranges from A3 to F1 over each cycle, and the radius of the star varies by 3.5%. To explain certain discrepant properties of the system, H.-F. Xue and J.-S. Niu proposed that the primary may be accreting mass from an orbiting dust disk. This is conjectured to be leftover material from a white dwarf companion as it passed through the asymptotic giant branch.

DY Pegasi has been classified as a SX Phoenicis variable on the basis of its low metallicity. However, a 2014 study by S. Barcza and J. M. Benkő found a much higher general abundance of heavy elements with [M/H] = −0.05±0.1 dex, approaching solar in composition. (This notation indicates the base-10 logarithm of the ratio of "metals" 'M' to hydrogen 'H', compared to the same abundances in the Sun. A value of 0.0 is solar.) They proposed that this may instead be a high amplitude Delta Scuti variable. The short period of this variable rules it out as an RR Lyrae variable.

The properties of DY Pegasi are uncertain due to the presence of an unknown companion, but it appears to lie close to the main sequence at the red (cool) edge of the instability strip. However, it has also been treated as a possible RR Lyrae variable which would be a horizontal branch star. As an old low-metallicity SX Phoenicis variable, it is very similar to blue stragglers, which are formed from stellar mergers or mass transfer in binary systems.
