= BO Lyncis =

Binary star in the constellation Lynx

- Location of BO Lyncis (circled)

Observation data Epoch J2000 Equinox J2000
- Constellation: Lynx
- Right ascension: 08^{h} 43^{m} 01.21223^{s}
- Declination: +40° 59′ 51.7692″
- Apparent magnitude (V): 11.48

Characteristics
- Spectral type: A5V-A8V + late A, kA6hA5mA9 (combined)
- B−V color index: +0.32
- J−H color index: +0.125
- J−K color index: +0.128
- Variable type: Delta Scuti variable

Astrometry
Radial velocity (R_{v})	23.48 ± 1.23 km/s
Proper motion (μ)	RA: −4.899 mas/yr Dec.: 1.485 mas/yr
Parallax (π)	0.7432±0.0194 mas
Distance	4,400 ± 100 ly (1,350 ± 40 pc)
Absolute magnitude (M_{V})	2.2 (A)

Orbit
Primary	BO Lyncis A
Companion	BO Lyncis B
Period (P)	34.53±0.10 yr
Semi-major axis (a)	5.19±0.18 AU (minimum)
Eccentricity (e)	0.64±0.03
Inclination (i)	~42°
Periastron epoch (T)	2452047.5±94.0
Argument of periastron (ω) (secondary)	185.5±3.1°

Details

BO Lyncis A
Mass	1.76 M_{☉}
Luminosity	13.6 (maximum), 9.4 (minimum) L_{☉}
Metallicity [Fe/H]	−0.3 dex
Rotational velocity (v sin i)	probably <40 km/s

BO Lyncis B
Mass	1.67 M_{☉}
Luminosity	~8.4 L_{☉}

Other designations
- BO Lyn, Gaia DR3 913186875504602624, TIC 99091734, TYC 2985-1044-1, GSC 02985-01044, 2MASS J08430121+4059517

Database references
SIMBAD	data

BO Lyncis, abbreviated BO Lyn and otherwise referred to as GSC 02985-01044, is a white-hued binary star in the northern constellation of Lynx. With an apparent magnitude of 11.49, it is too faint to be seen by the naked eye but can be observed using a telescope with an aperture of 60 mm (2.4 in) or larger. It is located at a distance of 1,350 parsecs (4,400 light-years) according to Gaia EDR3 parallax measurements, and is receding from the Sun at a heliocentric radial velocity of 23.48 km/s.

It was first discovered to be a Delta Scuti variable in 1994 during a survey of blue horizontal branch stars, and was subsequently assigned its variable-star designation in 1997.

== Stellar properties ==
The primary star is an A-type main-sequence star between the spectral types A5V and A8V, with a mass of approximately 1.76 M_{☉} and a luminosity fluctuating between 9.4 L_{☉} and 13.6 L_{☉}. A detailed spectral type of kA6hA5mA9 indicates that the classification would be A6 based on calcium K-lines, A5 based on hydrogen lines, and A9 based on the spectral lines of other metals.

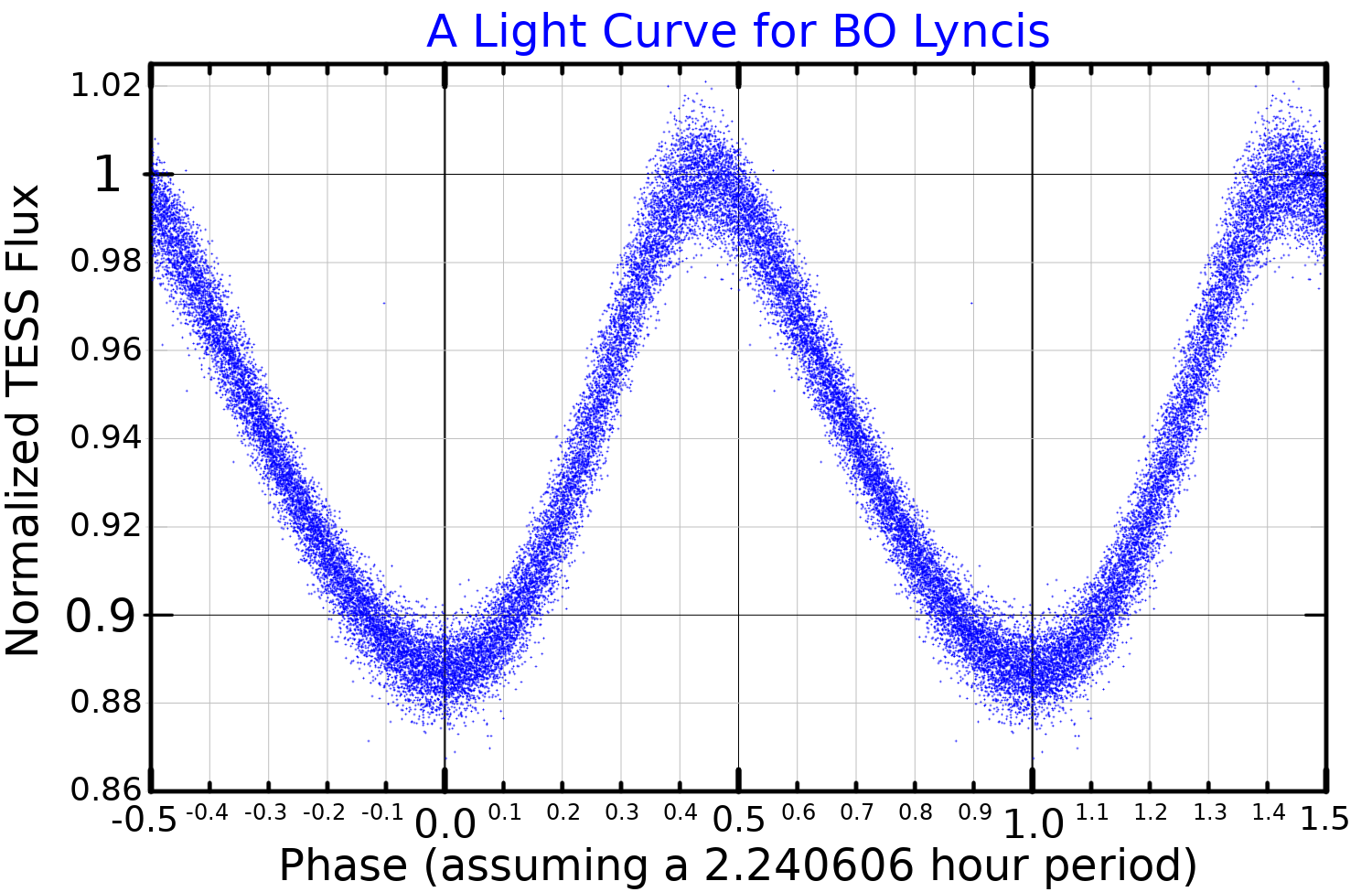
A light curve for BO Lyncis, plotted from TESS data

It has been described as a high-amplitude Delta Scuti variable (HADS), also known as an AI Velorum star, with a period of 0.0933584 days (10.7114 cycles/day) and an amplitude of 0.23 mag. The relatively short period signals that the star has a low metallicity of around −0.3, meaning it has only 10^{−0.3} ≈ 50% as much iron content as the Sun. In 2005, the period was found to be steadily decreasing at a rate of −1.5×10^{−10} days/day (0.056 d/Ma), which would later be revised to (1.52±0.26)×10^{−3} d/Ma by Li et al. (2018). Concurrently, two additional possible pulsation frequencies were discovered, at 15.81 and 13.60 cycles/day.

The secondary star has a minimum mass of 0.95±0.30 M_{☉}, which, coupled with the binary's blue color, suggests that it is an A- or F-type main-sequence star or a dim degenerate star. If the former is true, its luminosity is non-negligible, decreasing the apparent amplitude of the pulsating star (which happens to be relatively small for a HADS). Assuming an amplitude typical of the primary's spectral type at 0.40 mag, the luminosity of the secondary can be derived at ~8.4 L_{☉}, corresponding to a 1.67 M_{☉} late A-type main-sequence star. This places the inclination of the system at about 42°.

Stellar kinematics measurements imply that the star belongs to the old disk population of the Milky Way, though its distance above the Galactic plane is 628 parsecs (2,050 ly), which is two scale heights of the old disk population.
