= M10-VLA1 =

X-ray Binary in Globular Cluster Messier 10

- Location of M10-VLA1

Observation data Epoch J2000.0 Equinox ICRS
- Constellation: Ophiuchus
- Right ascension: 16^{h} 57^{m} 8.48^{s}
- Declination: −04° 05′ 55.7″

Characteristics
- Evolutionary stage: Black Hole + Red Straggler
- Spectral type: ?

Other designations
- M10-VLA1

Database references
SIMBAD	data

M10-VLA1 is a variable low-mass X-ray binary in the globular cluster Messier 10 that is also a radio source, situated in the equatorial constellation of Ophiuchus about 4,400 parsecs (14,000 light-years) distant. Discovered spectroscopically in 2018 as part of the MAVERIC (Milky Way ATCA and VLA Exploration of Radio-sources in Clusters) survey, the system was found to contain an unusual red straggler star orbiting an invisible companion of an uncertain nature, possibly a stellar black hole.

== Discovery ==
M10-VLA1 was detected using the Karl G. Jansky Very Large Array (VLA) in deep radio continuum imaging at 7.4 GHz, revealing a flux density of 27 ± 4 μJy and a flat to inverted radio spectrum indicative of compact emission from accretion processes. Chandra X-ray Observatory observations identified an X-ray counterpart with a luminosity of ~10^{31} erg/s, consistent with the radio-X-ray correlation for quiescent black holes. Hubble Space Telescope (HST) imaging revealed ultraviolet (UV) and optical variability, while spectroscopy from the SOAR Telescope showed double-peaked Hα emission lines, suggesting an accretion disk around the companion. The optical spectrum of the visible star resembles a G-type star.

== Charecterstics ==
The system has an orbital period of 3.339 days, determined through spectroscopic radial velocity measurements. The visible component is a red straggler, a star brighter and redder than typical for its position in M10’s color-magnitude diagram, likely formed through dynamical interactions or a merger in the dense cluster environment. The companion’s low radial velocity semi-amplitude and the system’s properties suggest a massive companion, most likely a black hole with a mass comparable to or greater than similar systems (e.g., COM J1740–5340 in NGC 6397). The binary’s face-on orientation (inclination < 4°) explains its observed characteristics if it is a black hole X-ray binary.

=== Messier 10 ===
Messier 10 is a relatively loose globular cluster with a metallicity of [Fe/H] ≈ -1.5 and an age of ~12–13 billion years, containing hundreds of thousands of stars. Globular clusters like M10 are known for hosting exotic objects such as X-ray binaries due to frequent stellar encounters in their dense cores. M10-VLA1 is a significant example of such systems, potentially representing one of the few confirmed black hole binaries in a Galactic globular cluster.

== Further Research ==
Further observations, including deeper spectroscopy or monitoring for flares or eclipses, are needed to definitively confirm the nature of the compact companion. If confirmed as a black hole, M10-VLA1 would contribute to understanding the formation and evolution of black hole binaries in dense stellar environments.
