= KIC 11145123 =

Star in the constellation Cygnus

Observation data Epoch J2000.0 Equinox ICRS
- Constellation: Cygnus
- Right ascension: 19^{h} 41^{m} 25.34114^{s}
- Declination: +48° 45′ 14.9900″
- Apparent magnitude (V): 13.12

Characteristics
- Evolutionary stage: blue straggler
- Spectral type: F7V
- B−V color index: +0.33
- Variable type: δ Scuti

Astrometry
Radial velocity (R_{v})	−136±4 km/s
Proper motion (μ)	RA: −20.900 mas/yr Dec.: −3.693 mas/yr
Parallax (π)	0.8344±0.01 mas
Distance	3,910 ± 50 ly (1,200 ± 10 pc)

Details
Mass	1.46 M_{☉}
Radius	1.57±0.07 R_{☉}
Luminosity	12.6 L_{☉}
Surface gravity (log g)	4.22 cgs
Temperature	7,590 K
Metallicity [Fe/H]	−0.1±0.11 dex
Rotation	≈100 days
Rotational velocity (v sin i)	1 km/s
Age	756 Myr

Other designations
- KIC 11145123, 2MASS J19412534+4845150

Database references
SIMBAD	data

KIC 11145123 (sometimes mistakenly called Kepler 11145123), is a white hued star located in the northern constellation Cygnus, the swan. It has an apparent magnitude of 13.12, making it readily visible in large telescopes, but not to the naked eye. The object is located relatively far at a distance of approximately 3,910 light years, but is rapidly approaching the Solar System with a radial velocity of −136 km/s.

== Characteristics ==
KIC 11145123 has a spectral classification of F7V, indicating that it is a main sequence F-type star. Atmospheric models suggest it may be hotter and possibly a late A-type star. It has 1.4 times the mass of the Sun, in contrast to the 1.7 times that would be expected from a normal late A main sequence star, and 1.57 times its radius. It radiates 12 times the luminosity of the Sun from its photosphere at an effective temperature of 7,590 K. Unlike most hot stars, KIC 11145123 spins exceptionally slowly with a projected rotational velocity of 1 km/s. This corresponds to a period of roughly 100 days. Despite appearing as a main sequence star (Gaia DR3 models it as such), it is most likely a blue straggler.

== Roundest natural object ==
KIC 11145123 is currently believed be the roundest natural object, with the difference between equatorial and polar radii equaling a mere three kilometers.
