= GP Andromedae =

Star in the constellation Andromeda

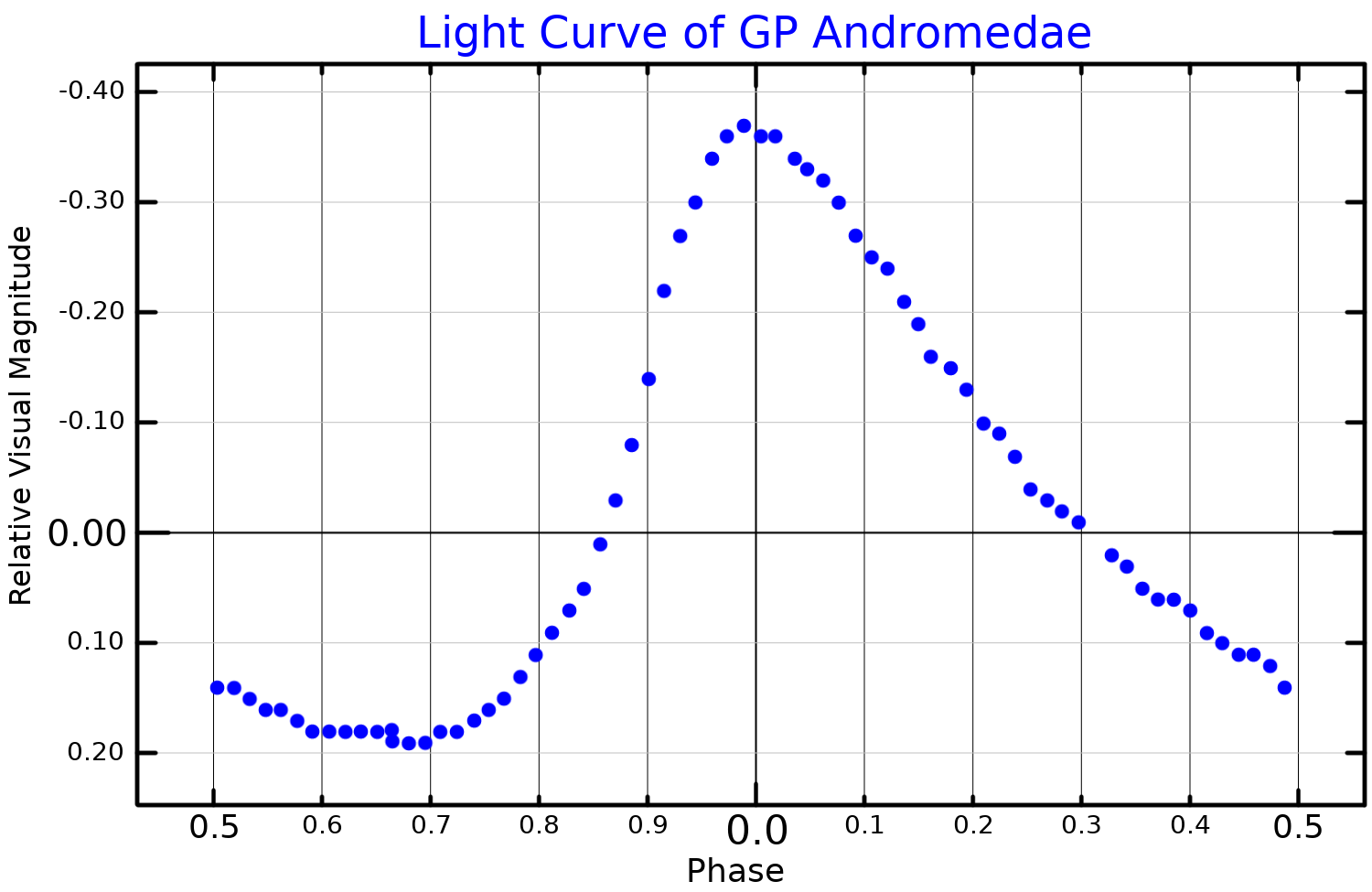
- The visual band light curve of GP Andromedae, shown over one pulsation cycle, adapted from Szeidl et al.

Observation data Epoch J2000 Equinox J2000
- Constellation: Andromeda
- Right ascension: 00^{h} 55^{m} 18.1501^{s}
- Declination: +23° 09′ 49.372″
- Apparent magnitude (V): 10.7 variable

Characteristics
- Evolutionary stage: main sequence
- Spectral type: A3
- Apparent magnitude (B): 10.96
- Apparent magnitude (G): 10.8282
- Apparent magnitude (J): 10.071
- Apparent magnitude (H): 10.018
- Apparent magnitude (K): 9.993
- B−V color index: 0.164
- Variable type: Delta Scuti

Astrometry
Proper motion (μ)	RA: 25.77±3.38 mas/yr Dec.: −0.37±2.58 mas/yr
Parallax (π)	1.9355±0.1468 mas
Distance	1,700 ± 100 ly (520 ± 40 pc)

Details
Mass	1.7±0.1 M_{☉}
Radius	1.72 R_{☉}
Luminosity	9.454 L_{☉}
Temperature	7,718 K
Age	13±3 Myr

Other designations
- 2MASS J00551814+2309494, HIP 4322, TYC 1739-1526-1

Database references
SIMBAD	data

GP Andromedae (often abbreviated to GP And) is a Delta Scuti variable star in the constellation Andromeda. It is a pulsating star, with its brightness varying with an amplitude of 0.55 magnitudes around a mean magnitude of 10.7.

== System ==
GP Andromedae is a main sequence Population I star of spectral type A3, placing it in the instability strip of the Hertzsprung-Russell diagram where Delta Scuti variables lay.

A visual companion star 11 arcseconds away, named TYC 1739-1526-2, shares a common proper motion and has a similar distance (measured by parallax) as GP Andromedae. There is no proof, however, that the two stars are gravitationally bound.

== Variability ==
The observed variability of GP Andromedae is typical for a Delta Scuti variable; it's a purely monoperiodic radial pulsating star with a period of 0.0787 days. The period of pulsations is slowly and continuously increasing, matching the predictions of stellar evolution models for Delta Scuti variables.
