= 19 Aquarii =

White-hued hydrogen-burning star in the constellation Aquarius

Observation data Epoch J2000 Equinox ICRS
- Constellation: Aquarius
- Right ascension: 21^{h} 25^{m} 13.01629^{s}
- Declination: −09° 44′ 54.7923″
- Apparent magnitude (V): +5.713

Characteristics
- Evolutionary stage: main sequence
- Spectral type: A8V
- B−V color index: +0.20

Astrometry
Radial velocity (R_{v})	−20.6±1.8 km/s
Proper motion (μ)	RA: +25.943 mas/yr Dec.: −167.548 mas/yr
Parallax (π)	12.5593±0.1676 mas
Distance	260 ± 3 ly (80 ± 1 pc)
Absolute magnitude (M_{V})	0.90

Details
Mass	1.86 M_{☉}
Radius	2.76+0.18 −0.16 R_{☉}
Luminosity	26.1+0.4 −0.4 L_{☉}
Surface gravity (log g)	4.13 cgs
Temperature	8,078±275 K
Rotational velocity (v sin i)	102 km/s
Age	788 Myr

Other designations
- 19 Aqr, BD−10°5668, HD 203875, HIP 105761, HR 8195, SAO 145382

Database references
SIMBAD	data

19 Aquarii is a star in the zodiac constellation of Aquarius. With an apparent magnitude of about 5.7, the star is barely visible to the naked eye as a white-hued star (see Bortle scale). Parallax estimates put it at a distance of about 260 light years away from the Sun. The star is moving closer to the Earth with a heliocentric radial velocity of −21 km/s.

This object is an A-type main-sequence star with a stellar classification of A8V. It is around 788 million years old with a fairly fast rotation rate, as its projected rotational velocity is about 155 km/s, so it must be rotating at least that fast. It has 1.86 times the mass of the Sun and 2.76 times the Sun's radius. 19 Aquarii is radiating 26 times the luminosity of the Sun from its photosphere at an effective temperature of 8,078 K. Eggen has this star flagged as a blue straggler and a member of the HR 1614 supercluster.
