= Gaia DR3 2893941099963718528 =

Blue straggler star in Canis Major

Observation data Epoch J2000.0 Equinox ICRS
- Constellation: Canis Major
- Right ascension: 06^{h} 29^{m} 31.108^{s}
- Declination: −31° 20′ 59.54″
Apparent magnitude (V)	15.6	

Characteristics
- Evolutionary stage: Blue straggler
- Spectral type: A3V
- Apparent magnitude (G): 15.09

Astrometry
Radial velocity (R_{v})	64.97±0.03 km/s
Proper motion (μ)	RA: −1.243 mas/yr Dec.: +5.480 mas/yr
Parallax (π)	0.2365±0.0207 mas
Distance	14,000 ± 1,000 ly (4,200 ± 400 pc)

Orbit
Period (P)	0.235±0.07 d
Semi-major axis (a)	1.94±0.05 R_{☉}
Eccentricity (e)	0.03
Inclination (i)	21.08±4.49°
Periastron epoch (T)	2453008.31±0.01
Argument of periastron (ω) (secondary)	37.21±14.22°
Semi-amplitude (K_{1}) (primary)	4.79±0.05 km/s

Details

A
Mass	1.72±0.12 M_{☉}
Radius	1.23±0.22 R_{☉}
Luminosity	10.59±0.03 L_{☉}
Surface gravity (log g)	4.49±0.58 cgs
Temperature	8,800±700 K
Metallicity [Fe/H]	−0.31±0.15 dex
Rotational velocity (v sin i)	95.63±9.78 km/s
Age	510±70 Myr

B
Mass	0.056±0.011 M_{☉}
Radius	0.08±0.13 R_{☉}
Surface gravity (log g)	4.91 - 5.37 cgs
Temperature	1100 - 2500 K

Other designations
- Gaia DR3 2893941099963718528, Gaia DR2 2893941099963718528

Database references
SIMBAD	data

Gaia DR3 2893941099963718528 is a blue straggler star in the constellation of Canis Major. The star is located in the open cluster NGC 2243, and is approximately 11,900 light years (3,650 parsecs) away. It has an apparent magnitude of 15.6. It was first discovered in August 2018 in the second data release of the Gaia Telescope.

== Stellar characteristics ==
Gaia DR3 2893941099963718528 is a blue straggler star in the open cluster NGC 2243. The star has an estimated radius of 1.23±0.22 R_{☉}, and a predicted mass of 1.72±0.12 M_{☉}. The radius was found using a bolometric luminosity of 10.59±0.03 L_{☉}, and an effective temperature of 8,800±700 K. It is believed to be extremely metal-poor with a metallicity of −0.31±0.15 dex. It is proposed to be 510±70 million years old. The star has a spectral type of A3V. It is a fast rotating star with a rotational velocity of 95.63±9.78 km/s.

== Substellar companions ==
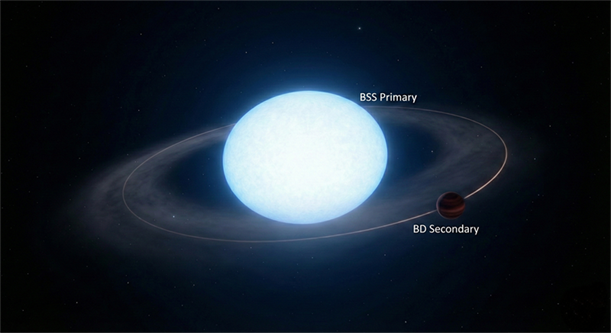
Artistic representation of Gaia DR3 2893941099963718528 system

In 2026, a substellar object was discovered orbiting around Gaia DR3 2893941099963718528. It is designated Gaia DR3 2893941099963718528 b and is either a planet or brown dwarf. The substellar object is in a tight, low-eccentricity compact orbit around its host star in roughly 5.6 hours. The substellar object has a mass between 20 and 70 M_{J}, implying that it is likely a brown dwarf. The substellar object has a radius of 0.8 R_{J}, and calculated temperature between 1,100 and 2,500 K.
