= HR 1170 =

Variable star in the constellation Perseus

- Location of HR 1170 (circled)

Observation data Epoch J2000.0 Equinox J2000.0
- Constellation: Perseus
- Right ascension: 03^{h} 49^{m} 08.10977^{s}
- Declination: +43° 57′ 47.3016″
- Apparent magnitude (V): 5.77 - 5.91

Characteristics
- Evolutionary stage: main sequence
- Spectral type: A9IV
- U−B color index: 0.06
- B−V color index: 0.26
- Variable type: Delta Scuti

Astrometry
Radial velocity (R_{v})	−11.1±2.6 km/s
Proper motion (μ)	RA: −3.453±0.244 mas/yr Dec.: 11.469±0.200 mas/yr
Parallax (π)	14.6959±0.2134 mas
Distance	222 ± 3 ly (68.0 ± 1.0 pc)
Absolute magnitude (M_{V})	1.73±0.07

Details
Mass	1.98±0.04 M_{☉}
Radius	2.7 R_{☉}
Luminosity	23±2 L_{☉}
Surface gravity (log g)	3.77 cgs
Temperature	7194±50 K
Metallicity [Fe/H]	0.30 dex
Rotational velocity (v sin i)	103 km/s
Age	1.12 Gyr

Other designations
- V376 Per, HD 23728, HIP 17846, SAO 39128

Database references
SIMBAD	data

HR 1170, also known as HD 23728 and V376 Persei, is a star about 220 light years from the Earth, in the constellation Perseus. It is a 5th magnitude star, so it will be faintly visible to the naked eye of an observer far from city lights. It is a variable star, whose brightness varies slightly from magnitude 5.77 to 5.91.

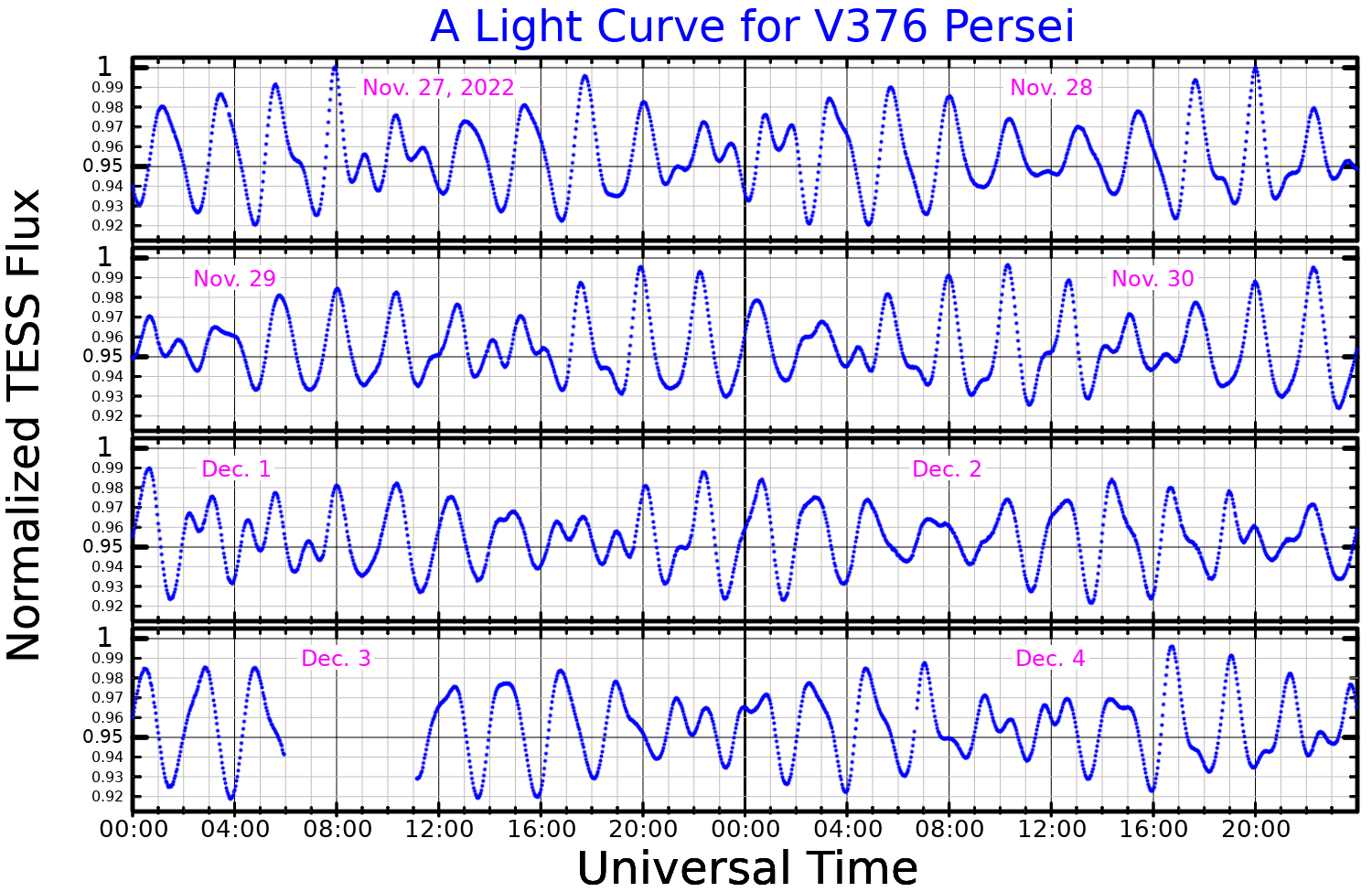
A light curve for V376 Persei, plotted from TESS data

Michel Breger announced that HR 1170 is a Delta Scuti variable star in 1969, based on observations taken over 6 hours and 10 minutes on October 13, 1967. He reported that it varied with a mean amplitude of 0.08 magnitudes, over a period of 2.2 hours. In 1970 it was given the variable star designation V376 Persei.

Early investigations of HR 1170 showed that it has more than one pulsation period, as is true for most Delta Scuti stars, and the light curve shows the different periods beating with each other. Many investigators have tried to determine the modes of oscillation present in this star. All but one of these studies find only two significant periods. All agree that one of the periods is approximately 2.386 hours, but the studies do not agree on the second period. There is also no agreement as to whether the pulsations are radial, nonradial or a combination of the two, though most of the later studies, which examine data taken over a longer time window, conclude that at least one of the pulsation modes is nonradial.
