= HR 5455 =

Star in the constellation Libra

- Location of HR 5455 (circled in red)

Observation data Epoch J2000 Equinox ICRS
- Constellation: Libra
- Right ascension: 14^{h} 36^{m} 59.79592^{s}
- Declination: −12° 18′ 19.0687″
- Apparent magnitude (V): 6.197±0.005

Characteristics
- Evolutionary stage: Blue straggler
- Spectral type: F6V
- B−V color index: 0.464±0.011

Astrometry
Radial velocity (R_{v})	−66.1±0.5 km/s
Proper motion (μ)	RA: −868.62 mas/yr Dec.: −364.52 mas/yr
Parallax (π)	37.1800±0.4010 mas
Distance	87.7 ± 0.9 ly (26.9 ± 0.3 pc)
Absolute magnitude (M_{V})	3.66

Orbit
Primary	Aa
Name	Ab
Period (P)	1,086±77 d
Semi-major axis (a)	1.589 AU
Eccentricity (e)	≤ 0.15

Details

Aa
Mass	1.32 M_{☉}
Radius	1.39±0.06 R_{☉}
Luminosity	2.75 L_{☉}
Surface gravity (log g)	4.28±0.10 cgs
Temperature	6,341±70 K
Metallicity [Fe/H]	−0.10±0.06 dex
Rotational velocity (v sin i)	16.2±0.5 km/s
Age	1.7±0.6 Gyr; 3.10 Gyr

Ab
Mass	0.49±0.09 M_{☉} 0.130+0.036 −0.015 M_{☉}

Other designations
- BD−11°3770, FK5 1381, HD 128429, HIP 71469, HR 5455, SAO 158677, LAL 26630, LHS 2953

Database references
SIMBAD	data

HR 5455 is a binary star system located at a distance of 88 light years from the Sun in the southern zodiac constellation of Libra. It has a yellow-white hue and is just barely visible to the naked eye with an apparent visual magnitude of 6.20. The system is drifting closer to the Sun with a radial velocity of −66 km/s and has a high proper motion, traversing the celestial sphere at the rate of 0.945″ per year. It is a well-known high velocity star system with a net heliocentric velocity of 158.8 km/s. The system is orbiting through the galaxy with a high eccentricity of 0.62, which carries it from as close as 4.1 out to 17.5 kpc away from the Galactic Center.

== Binary system ==
This star was found to be a binary system based on variations in radial velocity data collected from the Hipparcos satellite. The pair have an orbital period of 2.97 ± 0.21 years with photometric data yielding an angular separation of 21.28±2.88 mas. Observations from the Gaia DR2 provide an estimated linear semimajor axis of 1.589 AU. The eccentricity of the orbit is unknown, but has been assumed to be near zero.

The visible member of this system, designated component Aa, has a stellar classification of F6V. Superficially, it resembles 2–3 billion year old F-type main-sequence star that is generating energy through core hydrogen fusion. However, the star displays anomalies that are a challenge to explain through the normal star formation process. The first is the high velocity orbit of the star through the Milky Way, which would be very difficult for a young population I star to accomplish. The second is an abnormally low iron-to-magnesium [Fe/Mg] abundance ratio. This strongly suggests it is an ancient population II star that was formed during the early starburst phase of the galaxy about 12 billion years ago – a period when high levels of magnesium was released during supernovae explosions of massive stars. Both anomalies can be explained by a mass transfer that converted a much older star into a blue straggler.

Evidence suggests that the companion, Ab, is a white dwarf star that evolved from an F- or G-type main-sequence star with a similar mass to the current primary. As component Ab became a red giant, it overflowed its Roche lobe and mass transfer took place. The white dwarf now has less than half the mass of the Sun, having transferred a substantial fraction of its mass to the current primary. The interaction would have circularized the orbit of the pair.

== Properties ==
The current primary has 1.32 times the mass of the Sun and 1.39 times the Sun's radius. It has a low metallicity and is completely lacking in lithium. The star is spinning with a projected rotational velocity of 16.2 km/s. It is radiating 2.75 times the luminosity of the Sun from its photosphere at an effective temperature of 6,341 K. The system is a source for X-ray emission.
