= V701 Coronae Australis =

Delta Scuti variable; Corona Australis

- Location of HD 168592 (circled)

Observation data Epoch J2000.0 Equinox J2000.0 (ICRS)
- Constellation: Corona Australis
- Right ascension: 19^{h} 03^{m} 17.69619^{s}
- Declination: −38° 15′ 11.3335″
- Apparent magnitude (V): 5.69 to 5.73

Characteristics
- Evolutionary stage: main sequence
- Spectral type: F2 III/IV or F0 IIIn
- B−V color index: +0.32
- Variable type: δ Scuti

Astrometry
Radial velocity (R_{v})	4±7.4 km/s
Proper motion (μ)	RA: +12.794 mas/yr Dec.: +14.271 mas/yr
Parallax (π)	15.2952±0.0559 mas
Distance	213.2 ± 0.8 ly (65.4 ± 0.2 pc)
Absolute magnitude (M_{V})	+1.55

Details
Mass	1.83^{+0.07}_{−0.06} M_{☉}
Radius	2.85±0.14 R_{☉}
Luminosity	17.5^{+0.2}_{−0.1} L_{☉}
Surface gravity (log g)	3.75±0.12 cgs
Temperature	7,046±240 K
Metallicity [Fe/H]	−0.21 dex
Rotational velocity (v sin i)	265 km/s
Age	1.25 Gyr

Other designations
- 40 G. Coronae Australis, V701 CrA, CD−38°13300, CPD−38°7685, GC 26177, HD 176723, HIP 93552, HR 7197, SAO 210859

Database references
SIMBAD	data

V701 Coronae Australis (HD 176723; HR 7197; 40 G. Coronae Australis), or simply V701 CrA, is a solitary, yellowish-white hued variable star located in the southern constellation Corona Australis. It has an average apparent magnitude of 5.72, making it faintly visible to the naked eye under ideal conditions. The object is located relatively close at a distance of 213 light-years based on Gaia DR3 parallax measurements, and it is currently receding with a poorly constrained heliocentric radial velocity of 4 km/s. At its current distance, V701 CrA's brightness is diminished by a quarter of a magnitude due to extinction and it has an absolute magnitude of +1.55.

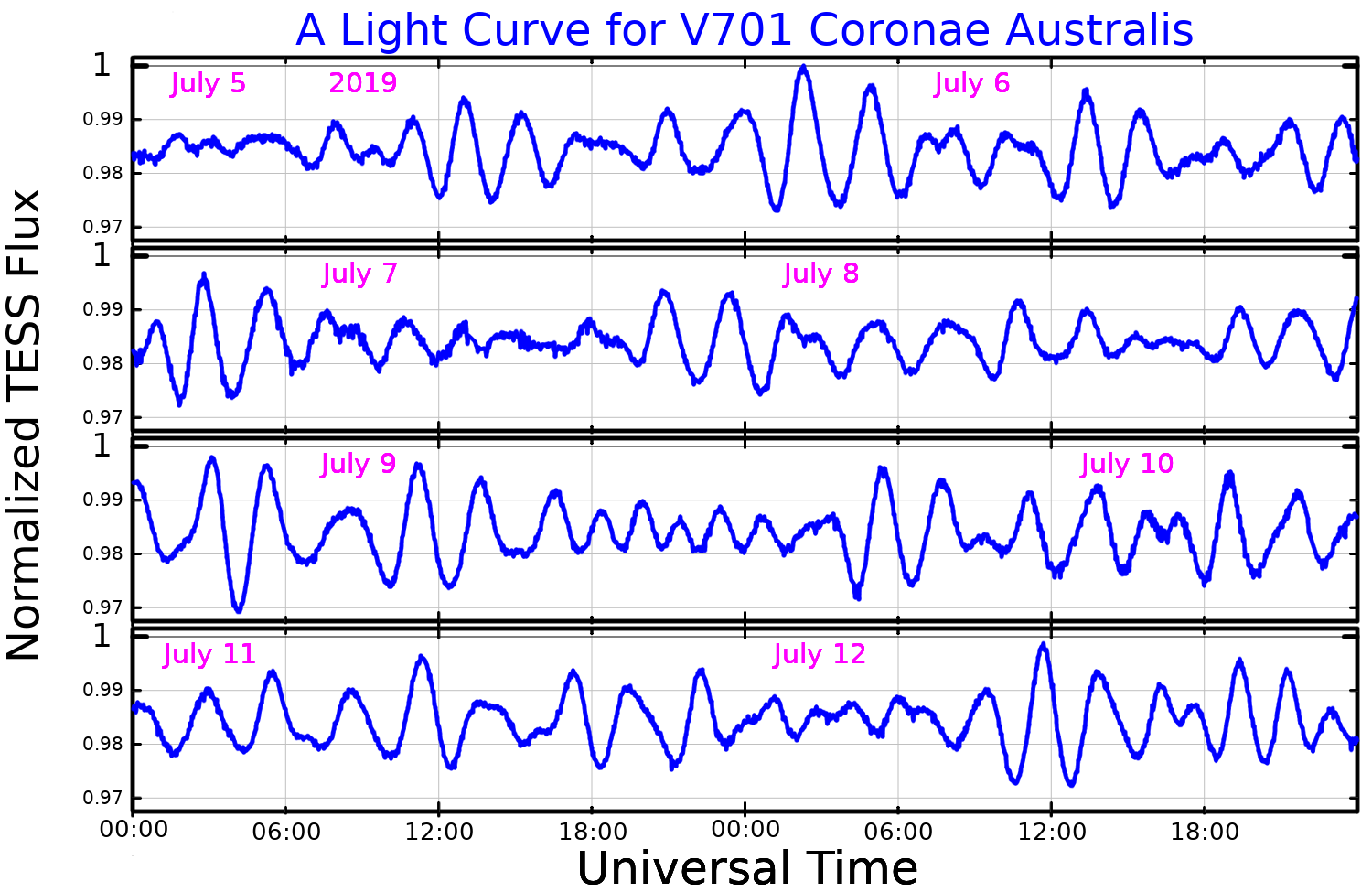
A light curve for V701 Coronae Australis, plotted from TESS data

The object was first suspected to be variable in 1990. The variations matched that of δ Scuti variables. Three years later, it was confirmed to be variable and was given the variable star designation V701 Coronae Australis. It ranges from magnitude 5.69 to 5.73 within 3.25 hours.

V701 CrA has a stellar classification of F2 III/IV, indicating that it is an evolved F-type star with the blended luminosity class of a subgiant and giant star. It has also been given a class of F0 IIIn, indicating broad or nebulous absorption lines due to rapid rotation. It has 1.83 times the mass of the Sun and a slightly enlarged radius of 2.85 R_{☉}. It radiates 17.5 times the luminosity of the Sun from its photosphere at an effective temperature of 7,046 K. The star spins rapidly with a projected rotational velocity of 265 km/s, which causes it to have an equatorial bulge that is 26% larger than the poles. It is metal deficient with an iron abundance 62% that of the Sun ([Fe/H] = −0.21) and it is estimated to be 1.25 billion years old. V701 CrA was considered to be a chemically peculiar star and was given a class of FpSr. Its peculiarity is now considered to be doubtful.
