= QQ Telescopii =

Delta Scuti variable; Telescopium

- Location of QQ Telescopii (circled)

Observation data Epoch J2000.0 Equinox ICRS
- Constellation: Telescopium
- Right ascension: 19^{h} 39^{m} 41.77938^{s}
- Declination: −45° 16′ 42.7871″
- Apparent magnitude (V): 6.25

Characteristics
- Spectral type: F2 IV or F0 III:
- B−V color index: +0.28
- Variable type: δ Scuti

Astrometry
Radial velocity (R_{v})	7.8±1.5 km/s
Proper motion (μ)	RA: −22.160 mas/yr Dec.: +5.375 mas/yr
Parallax (π)	9.8017±0.0327 mas
Distance	333 ± 1 ly (102.0 ± 0.3 pc)
Absolute magnitude (M_{V})	+1.01

Details
Mass	1.68 M_{☉}
Radius	3.19±0.16 R_{☉}
Luminosity	26.1±0.2 L_{☉}
Surface gravity (log g)	3.73±0.12 cgs
Temperature	7,380±136 K
Metallicity [Fe/H]	+0.07±0.15 dex
Rotational velocity (v sin i)	45±5 km/s
Age	995^{+121}_{−120} Myr

Other designations
- 66 G. Telescopii, QQ Tel, CD−45°13354, CPD−45°9764, GC 27167, HD 185139, HIP 96721, HR 7461, SAO 229800

Database references
SIMBAD	data

QQ Telescopii, also known as HD 185139 or simply QQ Tel, is a solitary variable star located in the southern constellation Telescopium. It has an apparent magnitude of 6.25, placing it near the limit for naked eye visibility, even under ideal conditions. Gaia DR3 parallax measurements imply a distance of 333 light years and it is currently receding with a heliocentric radial velocity of 7.8 km/s. At its current distance, QQ Telescopii's brightness is diminished by two tenths of a magnitude due to interstellar dust and it has an absolute magnitude of +1.01.

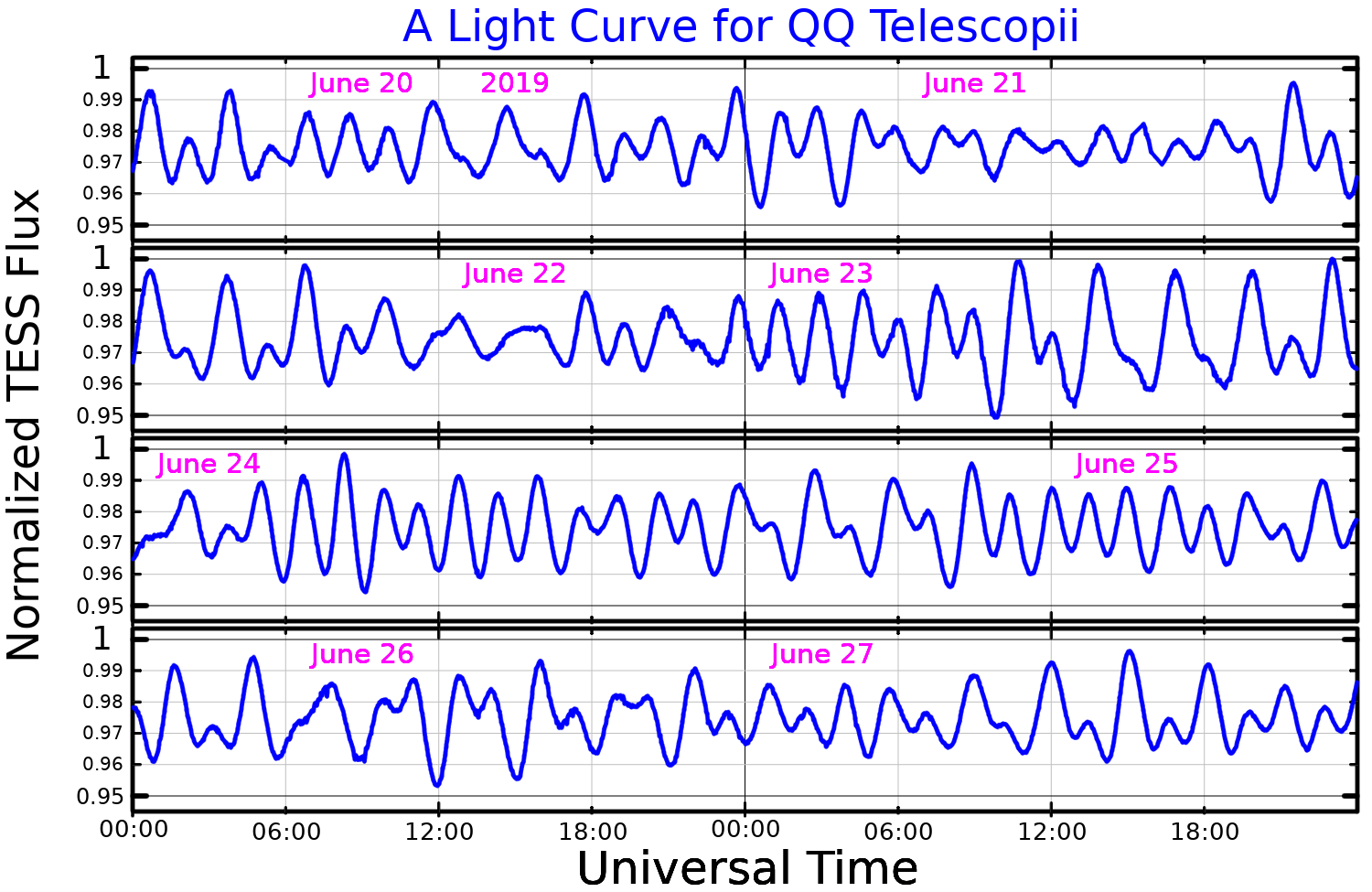
A light curve for QQ Telescopii, plotted from TESS data

HD 185139 was discovered to be a δ Scuti variable in 1982 by Debora W. Kurtz along with HR 151 (BG Ceti). After a few years of subsequent observations, it was given the variable designation QQ Telescopii in 1985. In 2002, C. Koen and colleagues attempted to identify the pulsation modes of the star. The brightness of QQ Tel fluctuates by about 0.05 magnitudes in the blue passband within 1.56 hours.

QQ Telescopii has a stellar classification of F2 IV, indicating that it is a slightly evolved F-type subgiant. It was previously classified as kA6mF0 III and A0pSr(CrSi), indicating that it is either a chemically peculiar Ap star or Am star. However, Renson & Manfroid (2009) considers its chemical peculiarity to be doubtful. Andersen & Nordstöm (1978) give it a class of F0 III:, indicating that it is an evolved F-type giant star with uncertainty about the luminosity class. Evolutionary models place it very close to the end of its main sequence life.

With 1.68 times the mass of the Sun and an enlarged radius 3.19 times that of the Sun, QQ Telescopii radiates 26.1 times the luminosity of the Sun from its photosphere at an effective temperature of 7,380 K, giving it a yellowish-white hue. It is slightly metal enriched at [Fe/H] = +0.07 but the value is poorly constrained. The star is estimated to be 995 million years old and it spins modestly with a projected rotational velocity of 45 km/s.
