= 40 Cancri =

Star in the constellation Cancer

Observation data Epoch J2000.0 Equinox ICRS
- Constellation: Cancer
- Right ascension: 08^{h} 40^{m} 11.45263^{s}
- Declination: +19° 58′ 16.0832″
- Apparent magnitude (V): 6.61

Characteristics
- Evolutionary stage: blue straggler
- Spectral type: A1 V
- B−V color index: 0.006±0.005

Astrometry
Radial velocity (R_{v})	+34.4±0.6 km/s
Proper motion (μ)	RA: −35.154 mas/yr Dec.: −13.463 mas/yr
Parallax (π)	5.3784±0.0417 mas
Distance	606 ± 5 ly (186 ± 1 pc)
Absolute magnitude (M_{V})	0.32

Details
Mass	2.46±0.12 M_{☉}
Radius	2.72±0.12 R_{☉}
Luminosity	91 L_{☉}
Surface gravity (log g)	3.78 cgs
Temperature	9,382 K
Rotational velocity (v sin i)	10 km/s
Age	349 Myr

Other designations
- 40 Cnc, BD+20°2159, HD 73666, HIP 42523, SAO 80336, WDS J08401+2000

Database references
SIMBAD	data

40 Cancri is a binary star system in the zodiac constellation of Cancer, located about 605 light years from the Sun in the Beehive Cluster (NGC 2632). It is a challenge to view with the naked eye, having an apparent visual magnitude of 6.61. The system is moving further from the Earth with a heliocentric radial velocity of 34 km/s.

The primary component appears to be a normal A-type main-sequence star with a stellar classification of A1 V, showing neither an organized magnetic field nor a chemical peculiarity. However, it is considered an extreme blue straggler. This is a second generation star formed through a collision of two low mass stars some 5–350 million years ago. The collision was either between two separate cluster members or the coalescence of a binary star system.

With an effective temperature of 9,382 K, this is the hottest star in the cluster by about 1,200 K. It has 2.46 times the mass of the Sun and 2.72 times the Sun's radius. The star has an unusually slow rotation for an A1V star, with a projected rotational velocity of 10 km/s. It is radiating 91 times the Sun's luminosity from its photosphere.

40 Cancri has a common proper motion companion, located at an angular separation of 0.425″±0.009″ along a position angle of 127.6°±0.5°, as of 1983. This object is about 2.5±0.5 magnitudes dimmer than the primary, and is most likely an F-type star with a mass of about 1.5 M_{☉}. The projected separation between the pair is 80 AU, so their orbital period is 450 years or greater.
