= HD 65907 =

Star in the constellation Carina

- Location of HD 65907 (circled in red)

Observation data Epoch J2000 Equinox ICRS
- Constellation: Carina
- Right ascension: 07^{h} 57^{m} 46.9143^{s}
- Declination: −60° 18′ 11.059″
- Apparent magnitude (V): 5.59

Characteristics
- Evolutionary stage: Blue straggler
- Spectral type: F9.5V
- B−V color index: 0.573±0.009

Astrometry
Radial velocity (R_{v})	+14.9570±0.0003 km/s
Proper motion (μ)	RA: +517.625 mas/yr Dec.: +119.206 mas/yr
Parallax (π)	61.8360±0.0417 mas
Distance	52.75 ± 0.04 ly (16.17 ± 0.01 pc)
Absolute magnitude (M_{V})	+4.54

Details
Mass	1.02+0.02 −0.01 M_{☉}
Radius	1.07±0.01 R_{☉}
Luminosity	1.30+0.04 −0.05 L_{☉}
Surface gravity (log g)	4.52±0.02 cgs
Temperature	5,992±9 K
Metallicity [Fe/H]	−0.315±0.005 dex
Rotational velocity (v sin i)	1.04 km/s
Age	11 Gyr

Other designations
- CD−59°1773, HD 65907, HIP 38908, HR 3138, TYC 8911-793-1

Database references
SIMBAD	A
- B
- C

HD 65907 is a star in the constellation Carina. At an apparent magnitude of +5.59, it is faintly visible to the naked eye in locations far from light pollution. Parallax measurements give a distance of 52.7 light-years (16.17 parsecs).

== Characteristics ==
The spectrum of this star matches a spectral class of F9.5V, with the luminosity class V suggesting that it is a main sequence star fusing atoms of hydrogen into helium at its core. Based on stellar isochrones, HD 65907 would be roughly 4.6 billion years old, nearly the same as the Solar System, and it would be expected to be a population I star. However, the chemical properties and galactic orbit of this star strongly indicate that it is a population II star, which would place its actual age at 11 billion years. To account for its old age, the star must be a blue straggler, the product of a stellar merger. The merger happened five billion years ago and involved two stars with less than 0.5 solar masses.

HD 65907 has 1.02 times the mass of the Sun and 1.07 times the Sun's radius. It radiates 1.30 times the Sun's luminosity from its photosphere at an effective temperature of 5,992 K. This temperature give it the yellowish-white hue typical of a star near the F/G boundary.

The star displays an infrared excess, indicating that it is surrounded by a debris disk. The disk has a radius of 96 astronomical units and a temperature of 30 K (−243.2 °C; −405.7 °F).

HD 65907 is part of a triple star system also known as Gliese 294 or WDS J07578-6018. The companions are named HD 65907 B and C, or Gliese 294 B and C, both red dwarfs with a combined spectral class of M0.5V, and apparent magnitudes of +9.88 and +13.5, respectively. The pair is separated at 60.6" from the F-type primary, with an estimated orbital period of 22,000 years, and the components B and C are separated by 2.468" from each other, with an estimated period of 270 years.
