= HD 93521 =

Star in the constellation Leo Minor

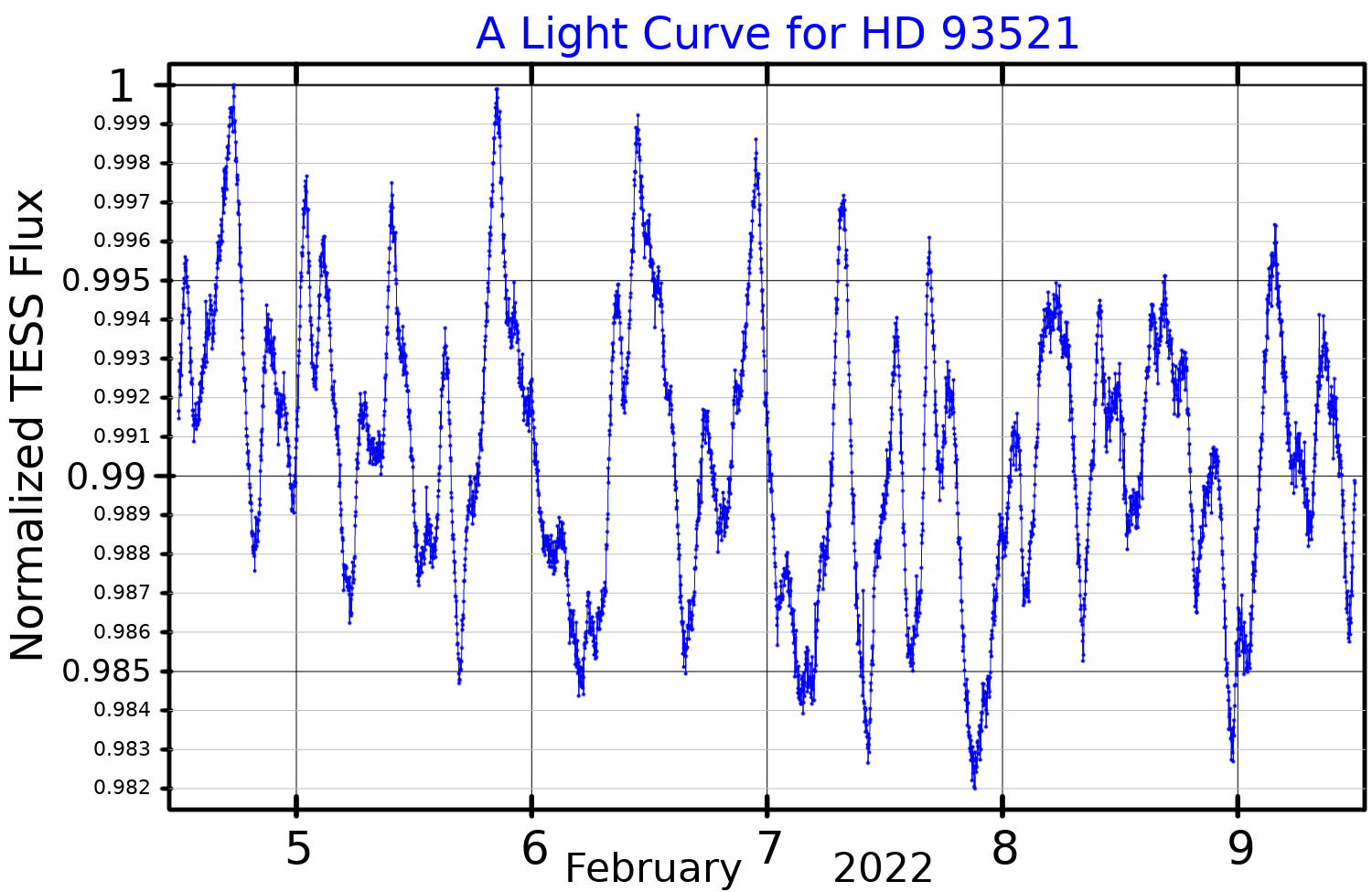
- A light curve for HD 93521, plotted from TESS data

Observation data Epoch J2000.0 Equinox J2000.0
- Constellation: Leo Minor
- Right ascension: 10^{h} 48^{m} 23.511^{s}
- Declination: 37° 34′ 13.08″
- Apparent magnitude (V): 7.03

Characteristics
- Spectral type: O9.5IIInn or O9.5Vp
- B−V color index: −0.227±0.007

Astrometry
| Radial velocity (R_{v}) | −14.1±3.2 km/s |
| Proper motion (μ) | RA: −0.162 mas/yr Dec.: −1.398 mas/yr |
| Parallax (π) | 0.6577±0.0333 mas |
| Distance | 5,000 ± 300 ly (1,520 ± 80 pc) |

Details
| Mass | 17 M_{☉} |
| Radius | Polar: 6.1±0.3 R_{☉} Equator: 7.4±0.4 R_{☉} |
| Luminosity | 39,800+10,300 −8,200 L_{☉} |
| Surface gravity (log g) | Polar: 4.1±0.4 cgs Equator: 3.7±0.4 cgs |
| Temperature | Polar: 34,600±1,200 K Equator: 28,700±1,200 K |
| Rotational velocity (v sin i) | 435±20 km/s |
| Age | <34 Myr |

Other designations
- BD+38°2179, GC 14866, HD 93521, HIP 52849, SAO 62257, PPM 75477

Database references
| SIMBAD | data |

HD 93521 is a single, massive star in the northern constellation of Leo Minor. With an apparent visual magnitude of 7.03, it is too faint to be seen with the naked eye. The star is located at a distance of approximately 5.0 kilolight-years (1.52 kpc) from the Sun based on parallax measurements. It is positioned at a high galactic latitude of +62° and is located about 4.6 kilolight-years (1.4 kpc) above the Galactic plane.

The spectrum of this star matches an O-type main-sequence star with a stellar classification of O9.5V. It is unusual for a star of this class to have formed so far away from the galaxy's star forming regions. Absorption lines in its spectrum indicate a metallicity that is inconsistent with being a population II star, which are typically found in the galaxy halo. Likewise, HD 93521 is unlikely to be a runaway star or a hot subdwarf, either of which could explain its remote location. It may instead be a blue straggler that was formed as a result of a merger. The resulting star likely began as a close binary system of lower mass, longer-lived stars that were ejected from the galactic disk. The merger would then have reset the evolutionary clock, producing a hotter, shorter-lived star.

HD 93521 is one of the most rapidly rotating stars known, with estimates of its projected rotational velocity ranging from 390 up to 435 km/s. This is at least 90% of the star's breakup velocity, assuming it is being viewed from along the equator. The rapid spin is creating an equatorial bulge with the radius at the equator being an estimated 7.4 times the Sun's radius while the polar radius is 6.1 times that of the Sun. Due to gravity darkening, the surface temperature at the poles is 34,600 K while the temperature at the equator is only 28,700 K.

The star may be undergoing mass loss from its stellar wind and have an equatorial disk of orbiting gas. The star shows evidence of non-radial pulsations, which may be the result of a more rapidly rotating core.

The brightness, position, and rapid rotation of this star makes it particularly suited to examining the interstellar gas in the Milky Way halo.
