= VZ Cancri =

Variable star in the constellation Cancer

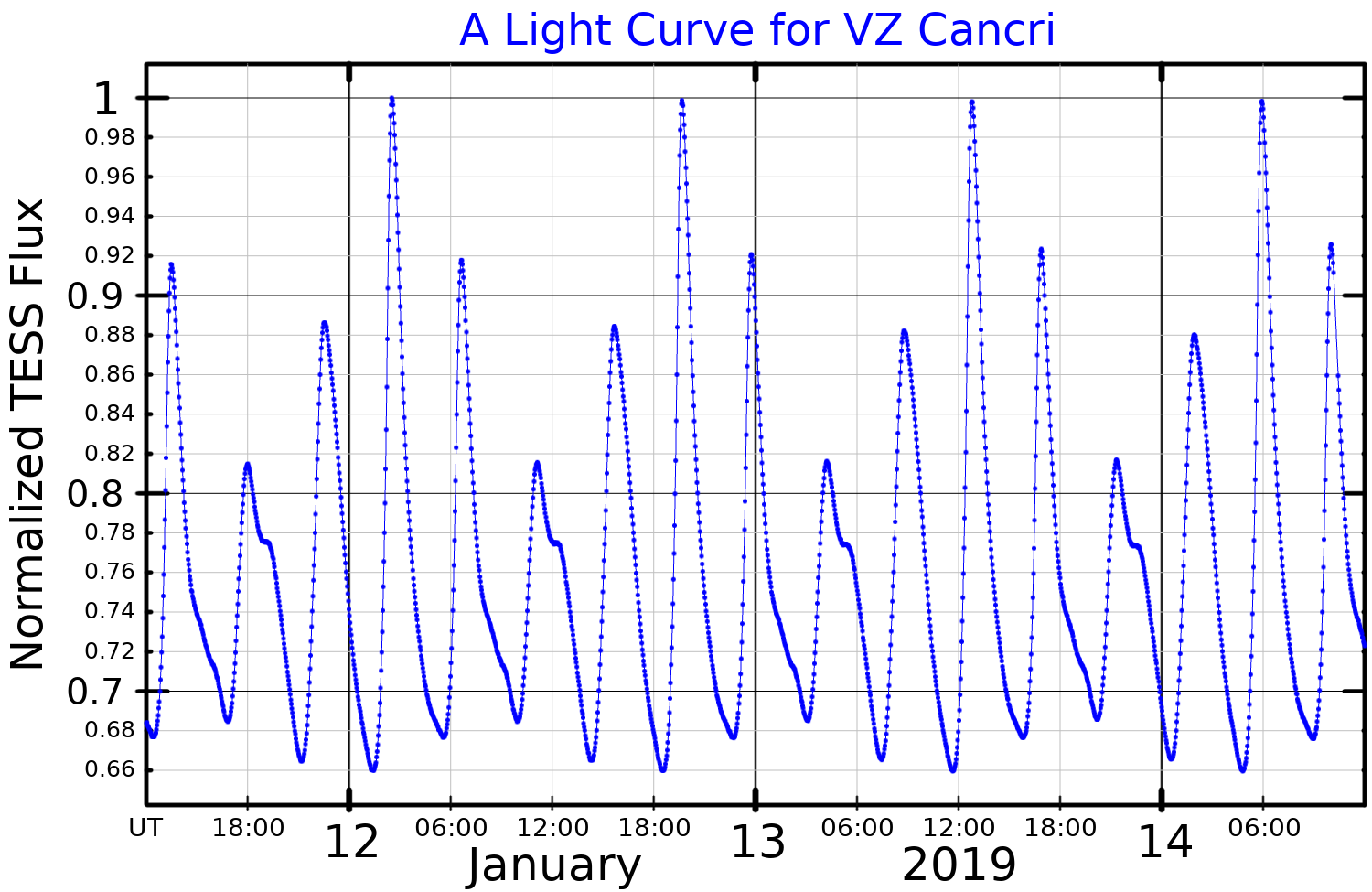
- A light curve for VZ Cancri, plotted from TESS data

Observation data Epoch J2000 Equinox ICRS
- Constellation: Cancer
- Right ascension: 08^{h} 40^{m} 52.125^{s}
- Declination: +09° 49′ 27.15″
- Apparent magnitude (V): 7.18 to 7.91

Characteristics
- Evolutionary stage: main sequence
- Spectral type: F2 III
- B−V color index: 0.288±0.020
- Variable type: δ Sct

Astrometry
| Radial velocity (R_{v}) | 25.2±0.4 km/s |
| Proper motion (μ) | RA: −29.005 mas/yr Dec.: −15.856 mas/yr |
| Parallax (π) | 4.5062±0.0268 mas |
| Distance | 724 ± 4 ly (222 ± 1 pc) |
| Absolute magnitude (M_{V}) | 1.79 |

Details
| Mass | 1.60 M_{☉} |
| Radius | 2.90 R_{☉} |
| Luminosity | 15.96 L_{☉} |
| Surface gravity (log g) | 3.4±0.2 cgs |
| Temperature | 6,909±219 K |
| Metallicity [Fe/H] | −0.41 dex |
| Rotational velocity (v sin i) | 26±1 km/s |
| Age | 1.70 Gyr |

Other designations
- VZ Cnc, BD+10°1848, HD 73857, HIP 42594, SAO 98035, PPM 154840

Database references
| SIMBAD | data |

VZ Cancri is a variable star in the constellation Cancer, abbreviated VZ Cnc. It varies in brightness with a period of 0.178364 days, from an apparent visual magnitude of 7.18 down to 7.91, which lies below the typical threshold of visibility for the naked eye. The distance to this star is approximately 724 light years based on parallax measurements, and it is receding from the Sun with a radial velocity of 25 km/s.

This star was discovered to vary in brightness by B. S. Whitney in 1950, and was classified as a cluster-type Cepheid variable, or RR Lyrae star. In 1955, W. S. Fitch found the light curve to be variable and discovered a beat period of 0.716292 d, from which is inferred a second pulsation period of 0.1428041 days. H. A. Abt found that the stellar class of this star varied from A7–A9 III during peak brightness to F1–F2 III at minimum. After H. J. Smith pointed out the distinctiveness of short period RR Lyrae variables in 1956, VZ Cnc has been grouped under the category of Delta Scuti variables.

The star is located near the center of the instability strip. Both pulsation periods for this star are in the first and second overtone; it appears to lack a fundamental mode, possibly as a result of helium depletion in the outer atmosphere. In 1994, an examination of five decades of data on this star suggested a variation in the period of maximum light with a cycle length of 49.3 years. This could be the result of previously undetected pulsation frequencies.
