= HD 89890 =

Brightest member of a star system in the constellation Vela

- Location of HD 89890 (circled in red)

Observation data Epoch J2000 Equinox ICRS
- Constellation: Vela
- Right ascension: 10^{h} 20^{m} 54.77319^{s}
- Declination: −56° 02′ 35.5728″
- Apparent magnitude (V): 4.50

Characteristics
- Spectral type: B3 III + A0 IVpSi + A2 + K0 III
- B−V color index: −0.102±0.014 (A + B)

Astrometry
Radial velocity (R_{v})	+10.4±2.8 km/s
Proper motion (μ)	RA: −7.5 mas/yr Dec.: +4.0 mas/yr
Parallax (π)	2.6564±0.2314 mas
Distance	1,200 ± 100 ly (380 ± 30 pc)
Absolute magnitude (M_{V})	−3.21 (A + B)

Details

A (HD 89890)
Radius	10.07±0.20 R_{☉}
Luminosity	3,082.41 L_{☉}
Surface gravity (log g)	3.00±0.03 cgs
Temperature	15,000±150 K
Rotational velocity (v sin i)	26.8±0.5 km/s

Other designations
- WDS J10209-5603
- A+B: CPD−55 3286, HIP 50676, HR 4074
- A: J Velorum, MV Velorum, HD 89890, SAO 237959, TYC 8604-975-1
- B: SAO 237960, TYC 8604-2444-1
- C: CD−55 3306, SAO 237958, TYC 8604-2137-1

Database references
SIMBAD	HIC 50676 (A+B)
- HD 89890 (A)
- TYC 8604-2444-1 (B)
- CD-55 3306 (C)

HD 89890 is the brightest member of a multiple star system with at least four components, located in the southern constellation of Vela. It is visible to the naked eye with an apparent visual magnitude of 4.50. The annual parallax shift of 2.6 mas provides a distance estimate of around 1,200 light-years (370 parsecs). It is moving further away from Earth with a heliocentric radial velocity of +10 km/s.

== System ==
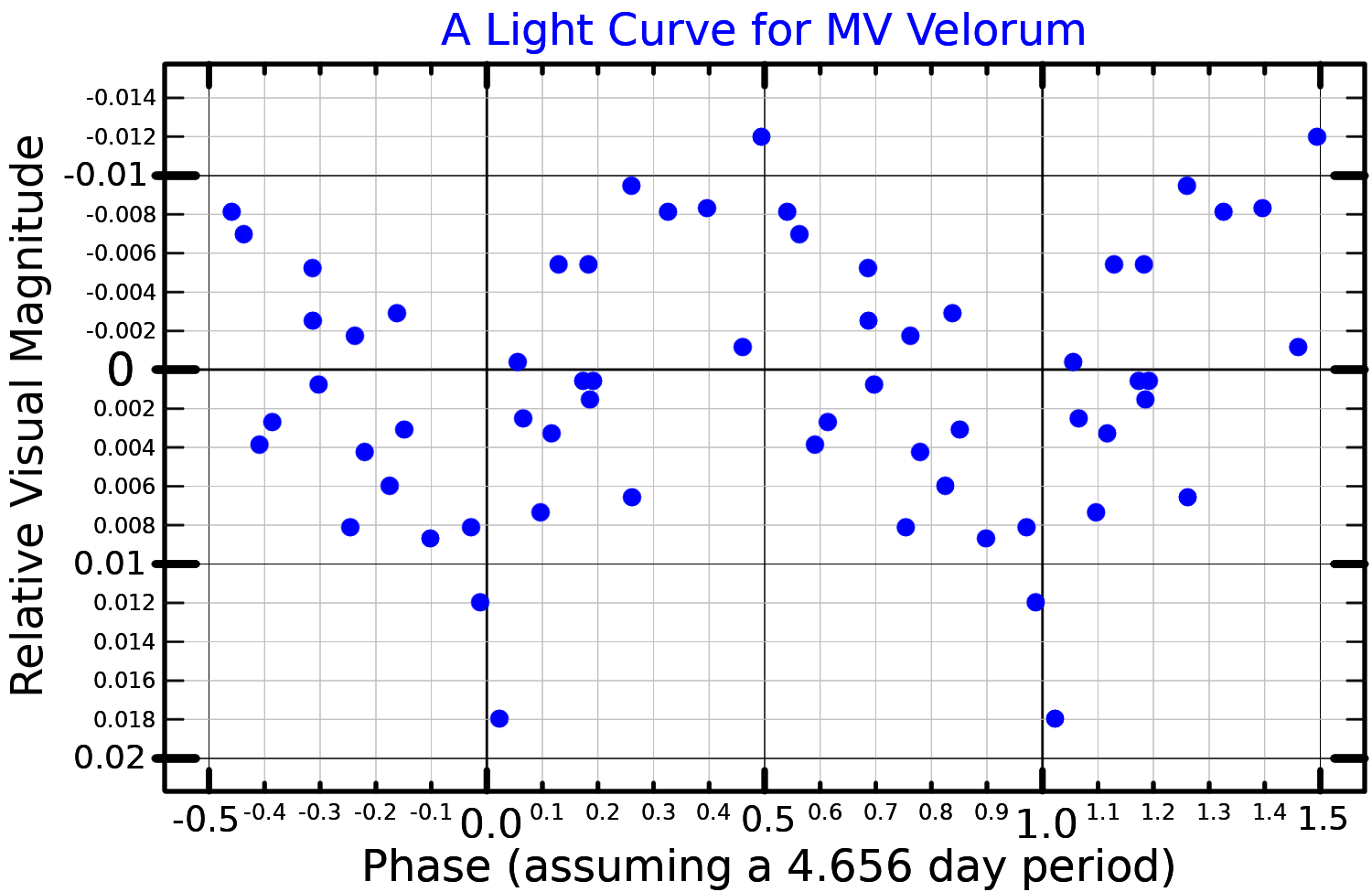
A visual band light curve for MV Velorum, adapted from Sterken et al. (1996)

The Washington Double Star Catalog lists three visible components for this system. The brightest, component A, is of visual magnitude 4.50. Component B has a magnitude of 7.179, and as of 2000 lies at an angular separation of 7.10″ from A, along a position angle (PA) of 102°. Component C is a magnitude 9.125 star at a separation of 36.20″ from A at a PA of 191°. The physical link between the stars was described on the basis of their dynamic parallax and mean velocities. The three components A, B and C have Gaia Data Release 2 parallaxes of 2.6564±0.2314 mas, 2.1771±0.0490 mas, and 1.6097±0.0400 mas, respectively.

== Properties ==
In 1996, Christiaam Sterken et al. announced that HD 89890 is a variable star. It was given its variable star designation, MV Velorum, in 1997.

Component A has a stellar classification of B3 III, and is categorized as a Be star. It shows photometric variations with multiple periods around 4.6 days and line-profile variations with a period of 2.318 days. The radial velocity of this star is constant. It has 10 times the Sun's radius and shines with 3,082 times the Sun's luminosity from its photosphere at an effective temperature of 15,000 K.

The component B shows a variation in spectra consistent with being a double-lined spectroscopic binary. The brighter member (Ba) is a silicon star with a class of A0 IVpSi, while the fainter component (Bb) is of type A2. Component C has a class of K0 III, indicating it is an evolved giant star. The measured effective temperature of C is 5,500 K. The fact that component A most likely shares a common origin with C suggests that the former is much older than expected, and may actually be a blue straggler formed from the merger of a close binary. This could have been caused by the gravitational influence of an unseen companion of A.
