= HR 3220 =

Binary star system in the constellation Carina

- Location of HR 3220 (circled in red)

Observation data Epoch J2000.0 Equinox ICRS
- Constellation: Carina
- Right ascension: 08^{h} 09^{m} 00.56958^{s}
- Declination: −61° 18′ 08.5836″
- Apparent magnitude (V): 4.75

Characteristics
- Evolutionary stage: Blue straggler
- Spectral type: F6 V Fe-0.8 CH-0.4
- U−B color index: −0.05
- B−V color index: +0.44

Astrometry
Radial velocity (R_{v})	+23.7 km/s
Proper motion (μ)	RA: −113.750 mas/yr Dec.: −297.923 mas/yr
Parallax (π)	55.3398±0.5399 mas
Distance	58.9 ± 0.6 ly (18.1 ± 0.2 pc)
Absolute magnitude (M_{V})	+3.19

Orbit
Period (P)	899.3±0.4 d
Semi-major axis (a)	≥39.0±0.7 Gm
Eccentricity (e)	0.119±0.012
Periastron epoch (T)	1,845±18
Argument of periastron (ω) (secondary)	135±5°
Semi-amplitude (K_{1}) (primary)	3.18±0.06 km/s

Details

A
Mass	1.35 M_{☉}
Radius	1.50+0.13 −0.06 R_{☉}
Luminosity	3.6±0.4 L_{☉}
Surface gravity (log g)	4.12 cgs
Temperature	6491+127 −259 K
Metallicity [Fe/H]	−0.27 dex
Rotational velocity (v sin i)	8.8 km/s
Age	10 Gyr

B
Mass	0.42+0.09 −0.05 M_{☉}

Other designations
- B Car, CPD−60°1074, FK5 2636, GJ 297.1, HD 68456, HIP 39903, HR 3220, SAO 250131

Database references
SIMBAD	data

HR 3220 is a binary star system in the southern constellation of Carina. It has the Bayer designation B Carinae; HR 3220 is the designation from the Bright Star Catalogue. It has a yellow-white hue and is visible to the naked eye with an apparent visual magnitude of 4.75. Based upon parallax measurements, it is located at a distance of 59 light years from the Sun. The system is drifting further away with a radial velocity of +24 km/s.

This is a single-lined spectroscopic binary system with an orbital period of 2.46 years and an eccentricity of 0.12. The visible component is an F-type main sequence star with a stellar classification of F6 V Fe-0.8 CH-0.4, where the suffix notation indicates mild but anomalous underabundances of iron and the methylidyne radical. The secondary is most likely a helium white dwarf with 0.42 times the mass of the Sun. Mass transfer from the white dwarf progenitor has given the primary the spectral signature of a blue straggler that appears much younger than its actual age of about 10 billion years.
