= AI Velorum =

Variable star in the constellation of Lynx

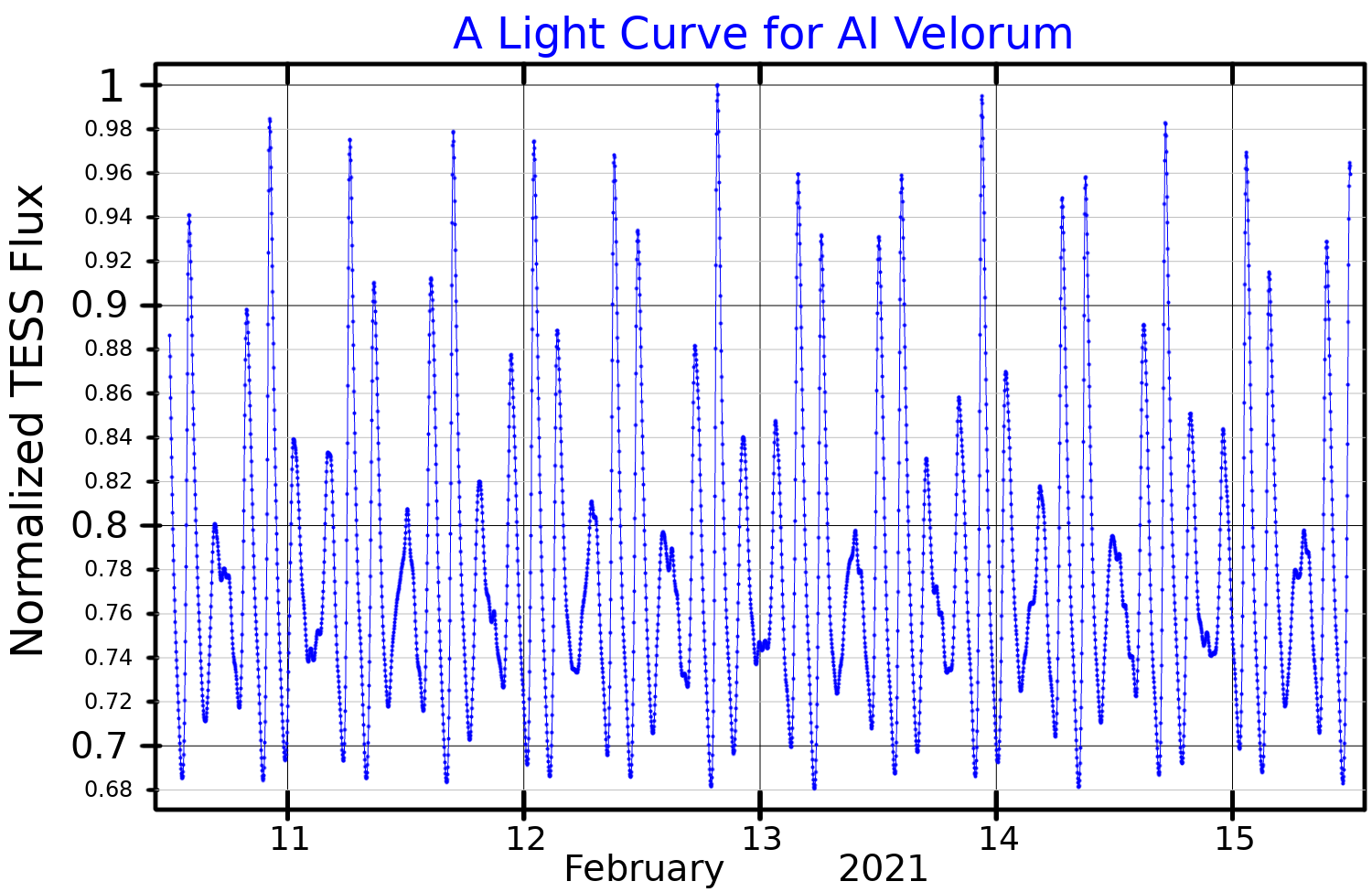
- A light curve for AI Velorum, plotted from TESS data

Observation data Epoch J2000 Equinox J2000
- Constellation: Vela
- Right ascension: 08^{h} 14^{m} 05.146^{s}
- Declination: −44° 34′ 32.85″
- Apparent magnitude (V): 6.15 to 6.76

Characteristics
- Spectral type: A9IV/V
- B−V color index: 0.18±0.02
- Variable type: δ Sct

Astrometry
Radial velocity (R_{v})	9.0±2.4 km/s
Proper motion (μ)	RA: 26.222 mas/yr Dec.: 31.094 mas/yr
Parallax (π)	9.9703±0.0191 mas
Distance	327.1 ± 0.6 ly (100.3 ± 0.2 pc)
Absolute magnitude (M_{V})	1.61

Details
Mass	1.55 M_{☉}
Radius	2.86 R_{☉}
Luminosity	20 L_{☉}
Surface gravity (log g)	3.85±0.14 cgs
Temperature	7,496±255 K
Metallicity [Fe/H]	−1.33 dex
Rotational velocity (v sin i)	18 km/s
Age	479 Myr

Other designations
- AI Vel, CD–44°4192, GC 11221, HD 69213, HIP 40330, SAO 219640

Database references
SIMBAD	data

AI Velorum is a variable star in the southern constellation of Vela, abbreviated AI Vel. It is a prototype for a class of high amplitude Delta Scuti variables. The apparent visual magnitude of this star fluctuates around 6.56, which is just bright enough to be dimly visible to the naked eye. The distance to AI Vel is approximately 327 light years based on parallax measurements, and it is drifting further away with a radial velocity of about 9 km/s.

The variability of this star was announced by E. Hertzsprung in 1931. He found a period of about 2.67 hours, although he later found that period doubtful. In 1937, F. Zagar found irregular variations in the light curve. T. Walraven classified it as an RR Lyrae star in 1952 and suggested it may have two periods that interfered with each other. The primary period was found to be 2.678 hours while the secondary is 2.069 hours; together their interference creates a beat period of 9.100 hours. The height of the maximum was found to be greater than the depth of the minimum, which may be the result of shockwaves that increase light emission.

As an RR Lyrae variable, AI Velorum should be a low mass, evolved star. However, M. Breger in 1977 noted the period and surface gravity showed a match with Delta Scuti stars of the same period. Together with the space velocity, these indicated it is instead a normal, high mass star belonging to the younger population I. By 1985, there was some evidence for an increase in the second period by one part in 10^{5}. At least two additional periodicities were identified by Walraven and associates in 1992.

The stellar classification of AI Vel is A9IV/V, matching a slightly evolved star that is moving away from the main sequence. It is 479 million years old and is estimated to have 1.55 times the mass of the Sun. As a Delta Scuti variable, the brightness of the star ranges in magnitude from 6.15 down to 6.76. Evolutionary models published with Gaia Data Release 3 show it to be approaching the end of its main sequence life.
