= SX Phoenicis =

Low-metallicity variable star

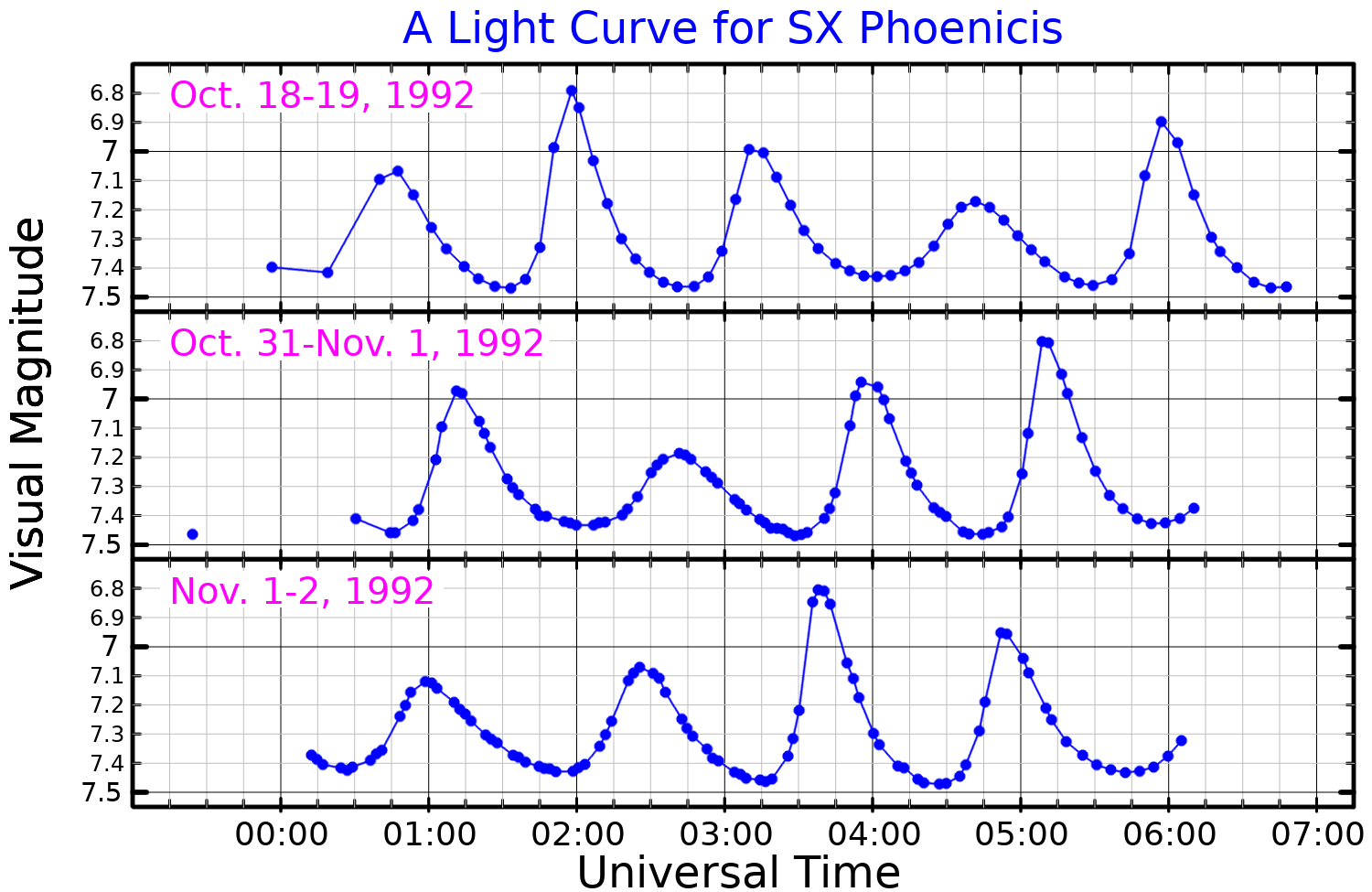
- A visual band light curve for SX Phoenicis, adapted from Stankov et al. (2002)

Observation data Epoch J2000 Equinox ICRS
- Constellation: Phoenix
- Right ascension: 23^{h} 46^{m} 32.89291^{s}
- Declination: −41° 34′ 54.7708″
- Apparent magnitude (V): 6.76 – 7.53

Characteristics
- Spectral type: A2 V
- U−B color index: 0.05
- B−V color index: 0.23
- Variable type: SX Phe

Astrometry
Radial velocity (R_{v})	−37 km/s
Proper motion (μ)	RA: +255.287 mas/yr Dec.: −857.036 mas/yr
Parallax (π)	11.9996±0.0535 mas
Distance	272 ± 1 ly (83.3 ± 0.4 pc)
Absolute magnitude (M_{V})	2.87

Details
Mass	1.0 M_{☉}
Radius	1.50 R_{☉}
Luminosity	5.89 L_{☉}
Surface gravity (log g)	4.06 cgs
Temperature	7,684 K
Metallicity [Fe/H]	−1.4 dex
Rotational velocity (v sin i)	<18 km/s
Age	4.07 Gyr

Other designations
- SX Phe, CD−42° 16457, HD 223065, HIP 117254, SAO 231773

Database references
SIMBAD	data

SX Phoenicis is a variable star in the southern constellation Phoenix. With an apparent visual magnitude ranging around 7.33, it is too faint to be readily seen with the naked eye and requires binoculars. It is located 272 light years from the Sun, as determined from an annual parallax shift of 12 mas.

This is the prototype SX Phoenicis variable, which means it is a population II, high amplitude pulsating variable. SX Phoenicis has a very low metallicity, with only 4% the proportion of iron of the Sun. A member of the galactic halo, it has a retrograde orbit around the center of the Milky Way, and has an extremely high peculiar velocity of 323.2+12.7
−13.3 km/s. From its movement through space, it can be a member of the Kapteyn group, a moving group of stars with a similar movement as Kapteyn's Star.

Discovered to be variable by Olin J. Eggen in 1952, SX Phoenicis has been targeted in many studies of its light curve and spectrum. These observations revealed that SX Phoenicis has two pulsations periods of 0.055 and 0.043 days, which correspond to radial pulsations in the fundamental mode and in the first overtone, respectively. Other pulsation frequencies, combinations of these two, are also observed. The pulsations also cause the radial velocity of the star to vary by 38 km/s, with the same periods as the light variation. There is evidence that the pulsation periods change in a timescale of decades, with a possible cyclic variation period of 43 ± 10 years. Overall, the visual apparent magnitude of the star varies between 6.76 and 7.53.

SX Phoenicis is an A-type main-sequence star with a stellar classification of A2 V. During the 1940s it was classed as a "probable subdwarf" because of its low luminosity for the spectral class. On average, it has a luminosity of 5.89 times the Sun's luminosity and an effective temperature of 7,700 K. During the primary pulsation cycle, the temperature varies between 7,230 K at minimum brightness up to 8,170 K at maximum brightness; when the two pulsation cycles are appropriately phased, the temperature can reach 8,400 K. Similarly, the pulsations cause the radius of the star to change, which is evidenced by changes in the surface gravity. Stellar evolution models by Petersen and Christensen-Dalsgaard (1996), taking into account the pulsating behavior of the star, indicate that the properties of the star are consistent with a mass of 1.0 solar mass and an age of 4 billion years.

The origin of SX Phoenicis, and of SX Phoenicis variables in general, remains unclear. While its properties are well explained by standard stellar evolution, the observation of SX Phoenicis variables in old globular clusters indicates that these stars are blue stragglers, presumably formed by the merger of two stars or by interactions in a binary system. This explains why SX Phoenicis seems to be a young star, despite belonging to the halo population. In this scenario, SX Phoenicis was formed as a close binary star, whose components merged and originated a rejuvenated star, which started evolving as a single star.
