= SX Phoenicis variable =

Type of variable star

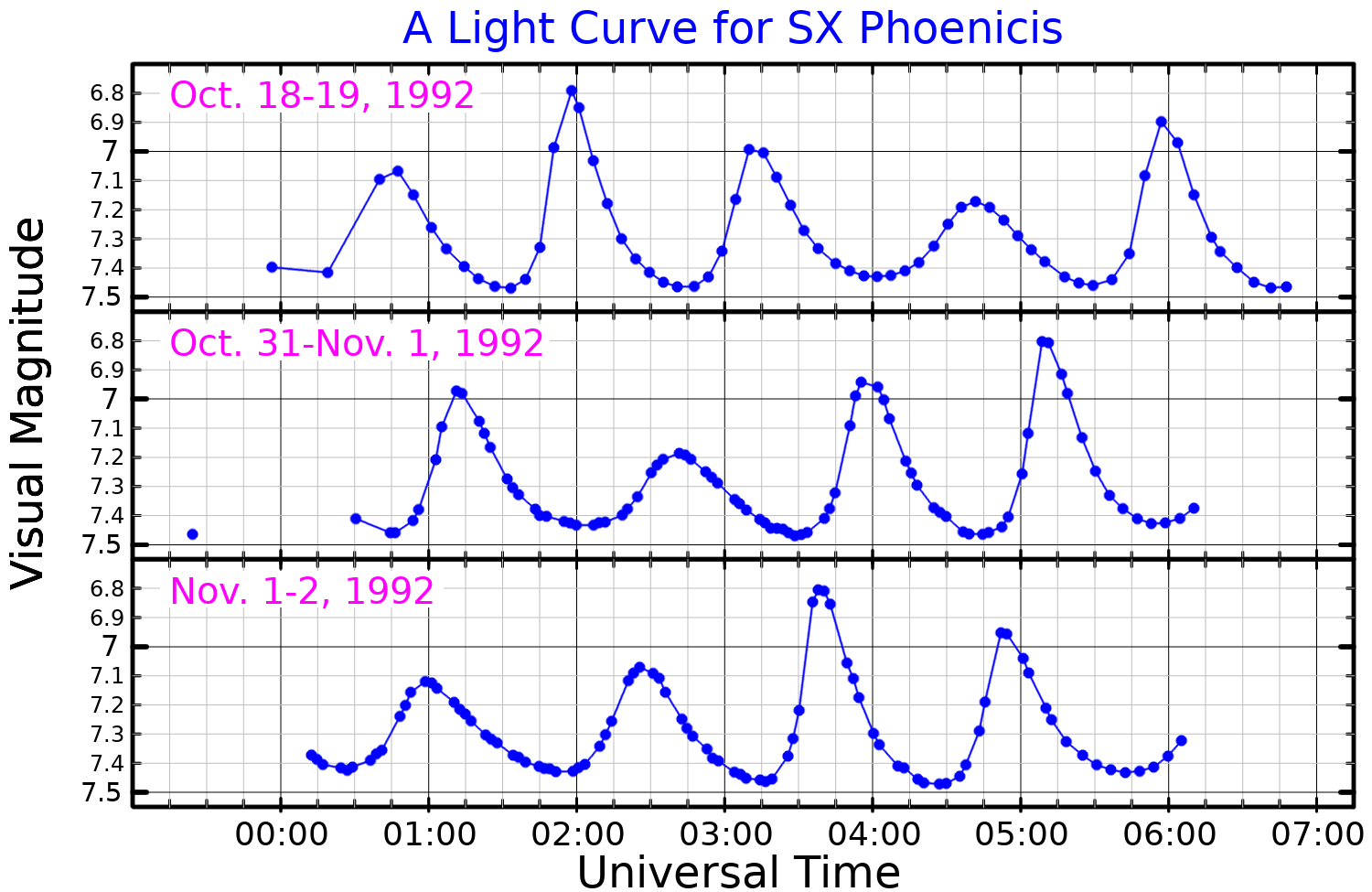
A visual band light curve for SX Phoenicis, adapted from Stankov et al. (2002)

An SX Phoenicis variable is a type of variable star. These stars exhibit a short period pulsation behavior that varies on time scales of 0.03–0.08 days (0.7–1.9 hours). They have spectral classifications in the range A2-F5 and vary in magnitude by up to 0.7. Compared to the Sun, these stars have a lower metallicity, which means they have a reduced abundance of elements other than hydrogen and helium. They also have relatively high space velocity and low luminosities for stars of their stellar classification. These properties distinguish the SX Phoenicis variables from their cousins, the Delta Scuti variables. The latter have longer periods, higher metallicity and large amplitudes.

SX Phoenicis variables are found primarily in globular clusters and galactic halos. The variability cycle has a period–luminosity relation. All known SX Phoenicis variables in globular clusters are blue straggler stars. These are stars that appear more blue (having a higher temperature) than the main sequence stars in the same cluster that have similar luminosities.

== List ==
The following list contains selected SX Phoenicis variable that are of interest to amateur or professional astronomy. Unless otherwise noted, the given magnitudes are in the V-band.

Star	Maximum magnitude	Minimum magnitude	Period (in days)	Spectral type
SX Phoenicis (Note: Double-mode.)	6.76	7.53	0.055	A2V
KZ Hydrae	9.46	10.26	0.060	B9III/IV
DY Pegasi	10.00	10.56	0.073	F5
CY Aquarii	10.42	11.20	0.061	B8
AE Ursae Majoris	10.86	11.52	0.086	A9
XX Cygni	11.28	12.13	0.135	A5–F5
BL Camelopardalis	12.92	13.25	0.039	
BX Sculptoris	13.42	13.71	0.037	A
