= Delta Scuti variable =

Subclass of pulsating star

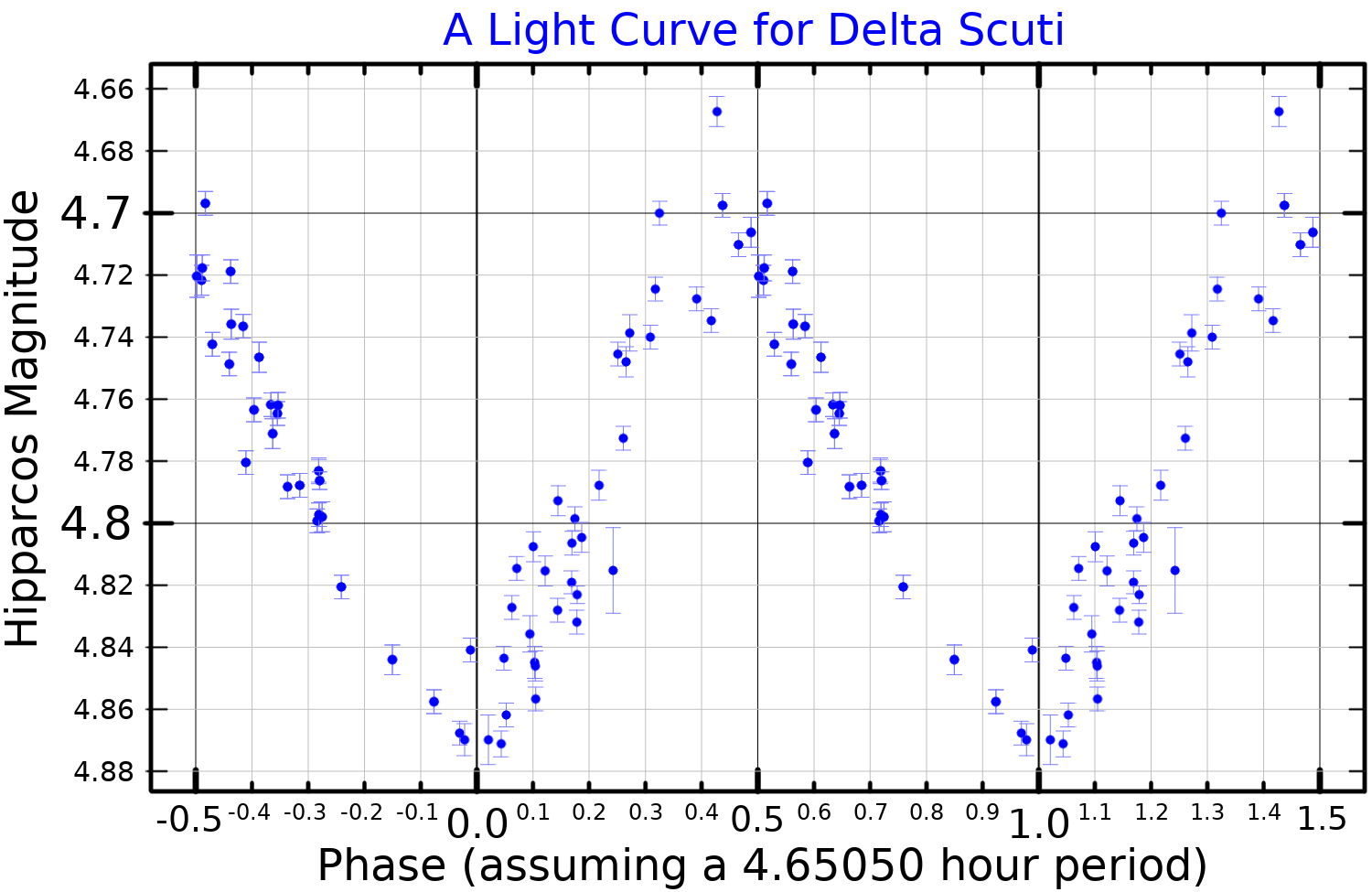
A light curve for Delta Scuti, plotted from Hipparcos data

A Delta Scuti variable (sometimes termed dwarf cepheid when the V-band amplitude is larger than 0.3 mag.) is a class of pulsating star, comprising several sub-classes of object with A- or F-type spectra.

The variables follow a period–luminosity relation in certain passbands like other standard candles such as Cepheids. Delta Scuti variables are standard candles. They have been used to establish the distance to the Large Magellanic Cloud, globular clusters, open clusters, and the Galactic Center. The OGLE and MACHO surveys have detected nearly 3,000 Delta Scuti variables in the Large Magellanic Cloud.

Typical brightness fluctuations of Delta Scuti variables are from 0.003 to 0.9 magnitudes in V over a period of a few hours, although the amplitude and period of the fluctuations can vary greatly. Indeed, Delta Scuti variables exhibit an overtone pulsation period boundary with classical Cepheids near 0.23-0.5 days. They are usually A0 to F5 type giant, subgiant, or main sequence stars. The high-amplitude Delta Scuti variables are also called AI Velorum stars, after the prototype AI Velorum. SX Phoenicis variables are generally considered to be a subclass of Delta Scuti variables that contain Population II stars, often blue stragglers, and can be found in globular clusters. SX Phe variables also follow a period–luminosity relation. One last sub-class are the pre-main sequence (PMS) Delta Scuti variables, stars that are more luminous than main sequence stars of the same temperature, still contracting towards the main sequence.

Delta Scuti stars exhibit both radial and non-radial luminosity pulsations. Non-radial pulsations are when some parts of the surface move inwards and some outward at the same time. Radial pulsations are a special case, where the star expands and contracts around its equilibrium state by altering the radius to maintain its spherical shape. The variations are due to the swelling and shrinking of the star through the Eddington Valve or Kappa-mechanism. The stars have a helium rich atmosphere. As helium is compressed it becomes more ionised, which is more opaque. So at the dimmest part in the cycle the star has highly ionised opaque helium in its atmosphere blocking part of the light from escaping. The energy from this “blocked light” causes the helium to heat up then expand, become more transparent and therefore allow more light through. As more light is let through the star appears brighter and, with the expansion, the helium begins to cool down. Hence the helium contracts under gravity and heats up again and the cyclical process continues. Throughout their lifetime Delta Scuti stars exhibit pulsation when they are situated on the classical Cepheid instability strip. They then move across from the main sequence into the giant branch.

The prototype of these sorts of variable stars is Delta Scuti (δ Sct), which exhibits brightness fluctuations from +4.60 to +4.79 in apparent magnitude with a period of 4.65 hours. Other well known Delta Scuti variables include Altair and Denebola (β Leonis). Vega (α Lyrae) is a suspected Delta Scuti variable, but this remains unconfirmed.

== Examples ==
Designation (name)	Discovery	Maximum (magnitude)	Minimum (magnitude)	Range of magnitude	Period	Spectral type	Comment
γ Boötis (Seginus)		3.02	3.07	0.05	6.96 h	A7III	
ε Cephei		4.15	4.21	0.06	0.98 h	F0IV	
HD 40372		5.88	5.92	0.04	1.466 h	A5me	In eclipsing binary system
α Lyrae (Vega)		−0.02	0.07	0.03	2.57 h	A0Va	5th brightest star in the night sky
HR 1170		5.77	5.91	0.14	2.39 h	A9IV	
δ Scuti		4.60	4.79	0.19	4.65 h	F2 IIIp	prototype
V701 Coronae Australis	Lampens & Rufuen (1990)	5.69	5.73	0.04	3.25 h	F2 III/IV	
QQ Telescopii	Kurtz (1982)	6.53 (blue)	6.58 (blue)	0.05	1.52 h	F2 IV	

Other examples include σ Octantis (Polaris Australis) and β Cassiopeiae (Caph).
