= Red-giant branch =

Portion of the giant branch before helium ignition

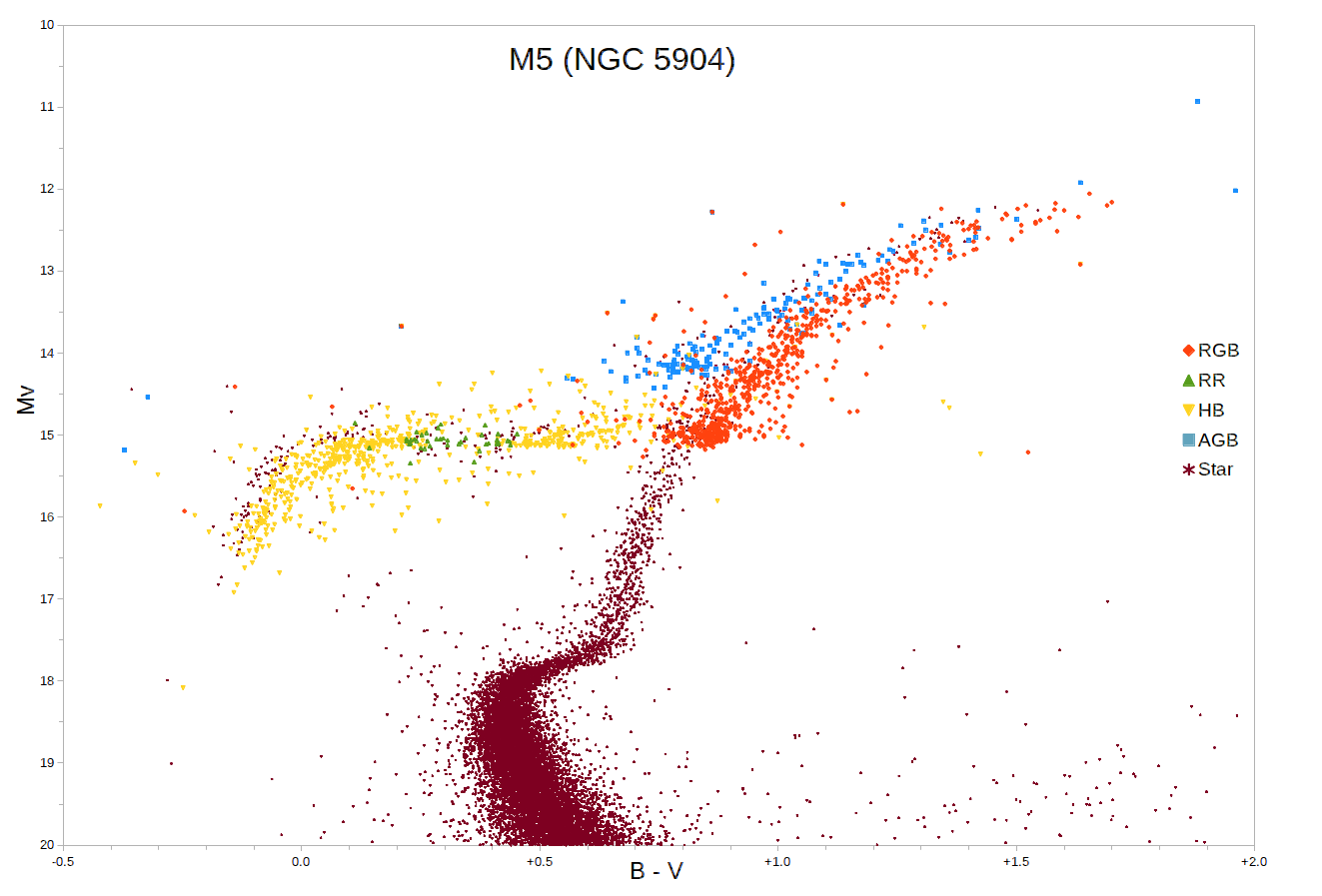
Hertzsprung–Russell diagram for globular cluster M5. The red-giant branch runs from the thin horizontal subgiant branch to the top right, with a number of the more luminous RGB stars marked in red.

The red-giant branch (RGB), sometimes called the first giant branch, is the portion of the giant branch before helium ignition occurs in the course of stellar evolution. It is a stage that follows the main sequence for low- to intermediate-mass stars. Red-giant-branch stars have an inert helium core surrounded by a shell of hydrogen fusing via the CNO cycle. They are K- and M-class but much larger and more luminous than main-sequence stars of the same temperature.

== Discovery ==
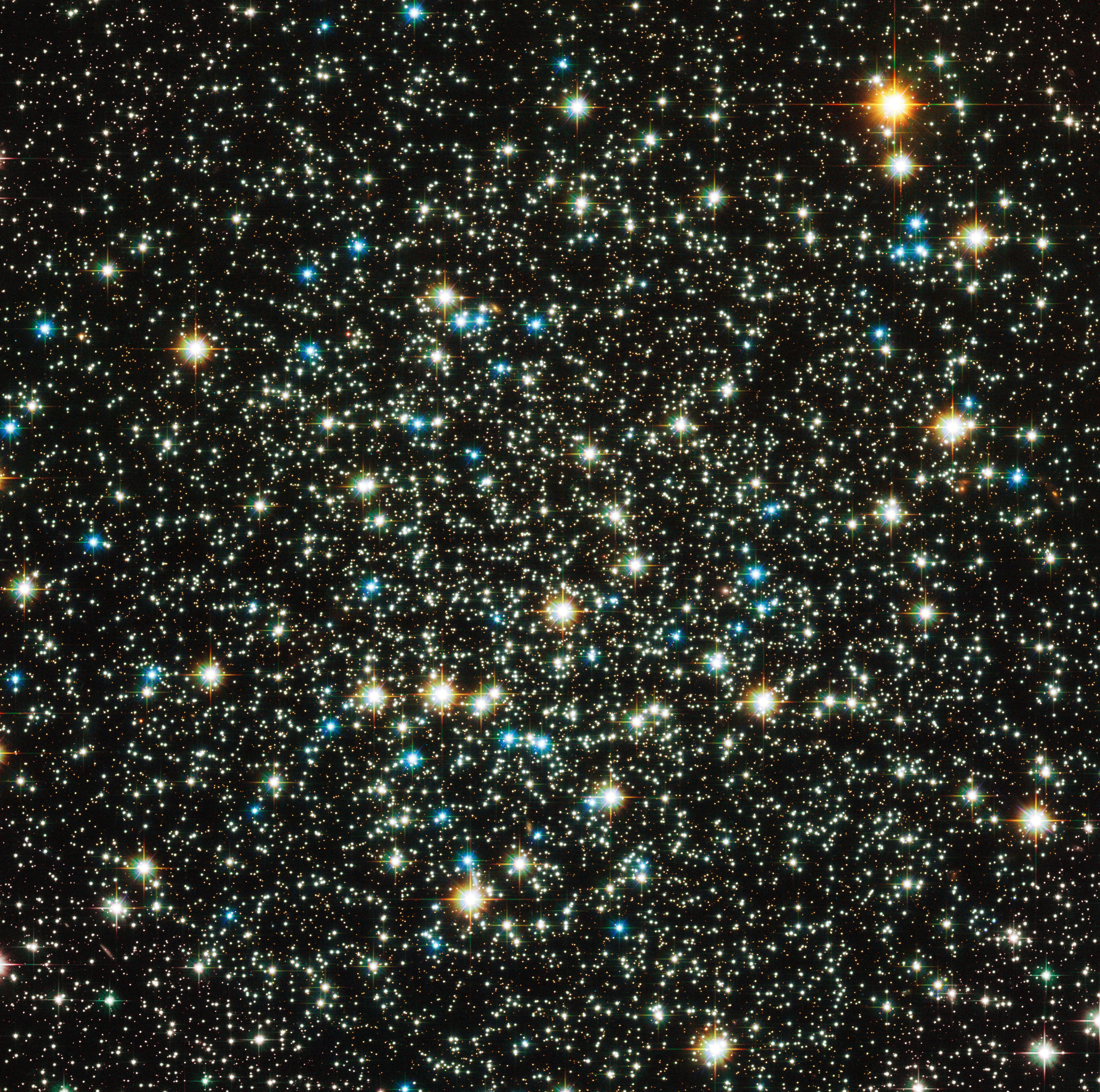
The brightest stars in globular clusters such as NGC 288 are red giants.

Red giants were identified early in the 20th century when the use of the Hertzsprung–Russell diagram made it clear that there were two distinct types of cool stars with very different sizes: dwarfs, now formally known as the main sequence; and giants.

The term red-giant branch came into use during the 1940s and 1950s, although initially just as a general term to refer to the red-giant region of the Hertzsprung–Russell diagram. Although the basis of a thermonuclear main-sequence lifetime, followed by a thermodynamic contraction phase to a white dwarf was understood by 1940, the internal details of the various types of giant stars were not known.

In 1968, the name asymptotic giant branch (AGB) was used for a branch of stars somewhat more luminous than the bulk of red giants and more unstable, often large-amplitude variable stars such as Mira. Observations of a bifurcated giant branch had been made years earlier but it was unclear how the different sequences were related. By 1970, the red-giant region was well understood as being made up from subgiants, the RGB itself, the horizontal branch, and the AGB, and the evolutionary state of the stars in these regions was broadly understood. The red-giant branch was described as the first giant branch in 1967, to distinguish it from the second or asymptotic giant branch, and this terminology is still frequently used today.

Modern stellar physics has modelled the internal processes that produce the different phases of the post-main-sequence life of moderate-mass stars, with ever-increasing complexity and precision. The results of RGB research are themselves being used as the basis for research in other areas.

== Evolution ==
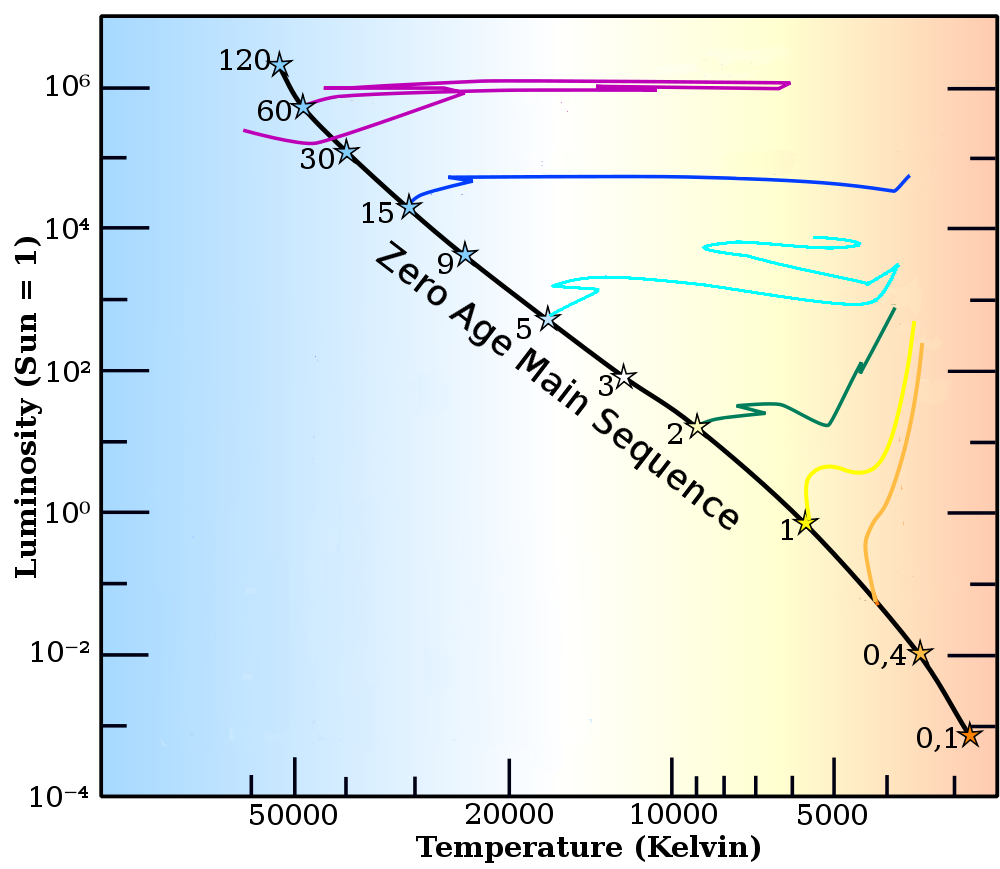
Evolutionary tracks for stars of different masses: the 0.6 M_{☉} track shows the RGB and stops at the helium flash.; the 1 M_{☉} track shows a short but long-lasting subgiant branch and the RGB to the helium flash.; the 2 M_{☉} track shows the subgiant branch and RGB, with a barely detectable blue loop onto the AGB.; the 5 M_{☉} track shows a long but very brief subgiant branch, a short RGB and an extended blue loop.

When a star with a mass from about 0.4 M_{☉} (solar mass) to 12 M_{☉} (8 M_{☉} for low-metallicity stars) exhausts its core hydrogen, it enters a phase of hydrogen shell burning during which it becomes a red giant, larger and cooler than on the main sequence. During hydrogen shell burning, the interior of the star goes through several distinct stages which are reflected in the outward appearance. The evolutionary stages vary depending primarily on the mass of the star, but also on its metallicity.

=== Subgiant phase ===
After a main-sequence star has exhausted its core hydrogen, it begins to fuse hydrogen in a thick shell around a core consisting largely of helium. The mass of the helium core is below the Schönberg–Chandrasekhar limit and is in thermal equilibrium, and the star is a subgiant. Any additional energy production from the shell fusion is consumed in inflating the envelope and the star cools but does not increase in luminosity.

Shell hydrogen fusion continues in stars of roughly solar mass until the helium core increases in mass sufficiently that it becomes degenerate. The core then shrinks, heats up and develops a strong temperature gradient. The hydrogen shell, fusing via the temperature-sensitive CNO cycle, greatly increases its rate of energy production and the stars is considered to be at the foot of the red-giant branch. For a star the same mass as the sun, this takes approximately 2 billion years from the time that hydrogen was exhausted in the core.

Subgiants more than about 2 M_{☉} reach the Schönberg–Chandrasekhar limit relatively quickly before the core becomes degenerate. The core still supports its own weight thermodynamically with the help of energy from the hydrogen shell, but is no longer in thermal equilibrium. It shrinks and heats causing the hydrogen shell to become thinner and the stellar envelope to inflate. This combination decreases luminosity as the star cools towards the foot of the RGB. Before the core becomes degenerate, the outer hydrogen envelope becomes opaque which causes the star to stop cooling, increases the rate of fusion in the shell, and the star has entered the RGB. In these stars, the subgiant phase occurs within a few million years, causing an apparent gap in the Hertzsprung–Russell diagram between B-type main-sequence stars and the RGB seen in young open clusters such as Praesepe. This is the Hertzsprung gap and is actually sparsely populated with subgiant stars rapidly evolving towards red giants, in contrast to the short densely populated low-mass subgiant branch seen in older clusters such as ω Centauri.

=== Ascending the red-giant branch ===
Sun-like stars have a degenerate core on the red-giant branch and ascend to the tip before starting core helium fusion with a flash.

Stars more massive than the Sun do not have a degenerate core and leave the red-giant branch before the tip when their core helium ignites without a flash.

Stars at the foot of the red-giant branch all have a similar temperature around 5,000 K, corresponding to an early to mid-K spectral type. Their luminosities range from a few times the luminosity of the sun for the least massive red giants to several thousand times as luminous for stars around 8 M_{☉}.

As their hydrogen shells continue to produce more helium, the cores of RGB stars increase in mass and temperature. This causes the hydrogen shell to fuse more rapidly. Stars become more luminous, larger and somewhat cooler. They are described as ascending the RGB.

On the ascent of the RGB, there are a number of internal events that produce observable external features. The outer convective envelope becomes deeper and deeper as the star grows and shell energy production increases. Eventually it reaches deep enough to bring fusion products to the surface from the formerly convective core, known as the first dredge-up. This changes the surface abundance of helium, carbon, nitrogen and oxygen. A noticeable clustering of stars at one point on the RGB can be detected and is known as the RGB bump. It is caused by a discontinuity in hydrogen abundance left behind by the deep convection. Shell energy production temporarily decreases at this discontinuity, effective stalling the ascent of the RGB and causing an excess of stars at that point.

=== Tip of the red-giant branch ===
For stars with a degenerate helium core, there is a limit to this growth in size and luminosity, known as the tip of the red-giant branch, where the core reaches sufficient temperature to begin fusion. All stars that reach this point have an identical helium core mass of almost 0.5 M_{☉}, and very similar stellar luminosity and temperature. These luminous stars have been used as standard candle distance indicators. Visually, the tip of the red-giant branch occurs at about absolute magnitude −3 and temperatures around 3,000 K at solar metallicity, closer to 4,000 K at very low metallicity. Models predict a luminosity at the tip of 2000–2500 L_{☉}, depending on metallicity. In modern research, infrared magnitudes are more commonly used.

=== Leaving the red-giant branch ===
A degenerate core begins fusion explosively in an event known as the helium flash, but externally there is little immediate sign of it. The energy is consumed in lifting the degeneracy in the core. The star overall becomes less luminous and hotter and migrates to the horizontal branch. All degenerate helium cores have approximately the same mass, regardless of the total stellar mass, so the helium fusion luminosity on the horizontal branch is the same. Hydrogen shell fusion can cause the total stellar luminosity to vary, but for most stars at near solar metallicity, the temperature and luminosity are very similar at the cool end of the horizontal branch. These stars form the red clump at about 5,000 K and 50 L_{☉}. Less massive hydrogen envelopes cause the stars to take up a hotter and less luminous position on the horizontal branch, and this effect occurs more readily at low metallicity so that old metal-poor clusters show the most pronounced horizontal branches.

Stars initially more massive than 2 M_{☉} have non-degenerate helium cores on the red-giant branch. These stars become hot enough to start triple-alpha fusion before they reach the tip of the red-giant branch and before the core becomes degenerate. They then leave the red-giant branch and perform a blue loop before returning to join the asymptotic giant branch. Stars only a little more massive than 2 M_{☉} perform a barely noticeable blue loop at a few hundred L_{☉} before continuing on the AGB hardly distinguishable from their red-giant branch position. More massive stars perform extended blue loops which can reach 10,000 K or more at luminosities of thousands of L_{☉}. These stars will cross the instability strip more than once and pulsate as Type I (Classical) Cepheid variables.

=== Properties ===
The table below shows the typical lifetimes on the main sequence (MS), subgiant branch (SB) and red-giant branch (RGB), for stars with different initial masses, all at solar metallicity (Z = 0.02). Also shown are the helium core mass, surface effective temperature, radius and luminosity at the start and end of the RGB for each star. The end of the red-giant branch is defined to be when core helium ignition takes place.

Mass (M_{☉})	MS (GYrs)	Hook (MYrs)	SB (MYrs)	RGB (MYrs)	RGB_{foot}				RGB_{end}			
Mass (M_{☉})	MS (GYrs)	Hook (MYrs)	SB (MYrs)	RGB (MYrs)	Core mass (M_{☉})	T_{eff} (K)	Radius (R_{☉})	Luminosity (L_{☉})	Core mass (M_{☉})	T_{eff} (K)	Radius (R_{☉})	Luminosity (L_{☉})
0.6	58.8	N/A	5,100	2,500	0.10	4,634	1.2	0.6	0.48	2,925	207	2,809
1.0	9.3	N/A	2,600	760	0.13	5,034	2.0	2.2	0.48	3,140	179	2,802
2.0	1.2	10	22	25	0.25	5,220	5.4	19.6	0.34	4,417	23.5	188
5.0	0.1	0.4	15	0.3	0.83	4,737	43.8	866.0	0.84	4,034	115	3,118

Intermediate-mass stars only lose a small fraction of their mass as main-sequence and subgiant stars, but lose a significant amount of mass as red giants.

The mass lost by a star similar to the Sun affects the temperature and luminosity of the star when it reaches the horizontal branch, so the properties of red-clump stars can be used to determine the mass difference before and after the helium flash. Mass lost from red giants also determines the mass and properties of the white dwarfs that form subsequently. Estimates of total mass loss for stars that reach the tip of the red-giant branch are around 0.2–0.25 M_{☉}. Most of this is lost within the final million years before the helium flash.

Mass lost by more massive stars that leave the red-giant branch before the helium flash is more difficult to measure directly. The current mass of Cepheid variables such as δ Cephei can be measured accurately because there are either binaries or pulsating stars. When compared with evolutionary models, such stars appear to have lost around 20% of their mass, much of it during the blue loop and especially during pulsations on the instability strip.

== Variability ==
Some red giants are large amplitude variables. Many of the earliest-known variable stars are Mira variables with regular periods and amplitudes of several magnitudes, semiregular variables with less obvious periods or multiple periods and slightly lower amplitudes, and slow irregular variables with no obvious period. These have long been considered to be asymptotic giant branch (AGB) stars or supergiants and the red-giant branch (RGB) stars themselves were not generally considered to be variable. A few apparent exceptions were considered to be low-luminosity AGB stars.

Studies in the late 20th century began to show that all giants of class M were variable with amplitudes of 10 milli-magnitudes of more, and that late-K-class giants were also likely to be variable with smaller amplitudes. Such variable stars were amongst the more luminous red giants, close to the tip of the RGB, but it was difficult to argue that they were all actually AGB stars. The stars showed a period amplitude relationship with larger-amplitude variables pulsating more slowly.

Microlensing surveys in the 21st century have provided extremely accurate photometry of thousands of stars over many years. This has allowed for the discovery of many new variable stars, often of very small amplitudes. Multiple period–luminosity relationships have been discovered, grouped into regions with ridges of closely spaced parallel relationships. Some of these correspond to the known Miras and semi-regulars, but an additional class of variable star has been defined: OGLE Small Amplitude Red Giants, or OSARGs. OSARGs have amplitudes of a few thousandths of a magnitude and semi-regular periods of 10 to 100 days. The OGLE survey published up to three periods for each OSARG, indicating a complex combination of pulsations. Many thousands of OSARGs were quickly detected in the Magellanic Clouds, both AGB and RGB stars. A catalog has since been published of 192,643 OSARGs in the direction of the Milky Way central bulge. Although around a quarter of Magellanic Cloud OSARgs show long secondary periods, very few of the galactic OSARGs do.

The RGB OSARGs follow three closely spaced period–luminosity relations, corresponding to the first, second and third overtones of radial pulsation models for stars of certain masses and luminosities, but that dipole and quadrupole non-radial pulsations are also present leading to the semi-regular nature of the variations. The fundamental mode does not appear, and the underlying cause of the excitation is not known. Stochastic convection has been suggested as a cause, similar to solar-like oscillations.

Two additional types of variation have been discovered in RGB stars: long secondary periods, which are associated with other variations but can show larger amplitudes with periods of hundreds or thousands of days; and ellipsoidal variations. The cause of the long secondary periods is unknown, but it has been proposed that they are due to interactions with low-mass companions in close orbits. The ellipsoidal variations are also thought to be created in binary systems, in this case contact binaries where distorted stars cause strictly periodic variations as they orbit.

== Bibliography ==
- Vassiliadis, E.; Wood, P. R. (1993). "Evolution of low- and intermediate-mass stars to the end of the asymptotic giant branch with mass loss". Astrophysical Journal. 413: 641. Bibcode:1993ApJ...413..641V. doi:10.1086/173033.
- Girardi, L.; Bressan, A.; Bertelli, G.; Chiosi, C. (2000). "Evolutionary tracks and isochrones for low- and intermediate-mass stars: From 0.15 to 7 M☉, and from Z=0.0004 to 0.03". Astronomy and Astrophysics Supplement Series. 141 (3): 371–383. arXiv:astro-ph/9910164. Bibcode:2000A&AS..141..371G. doi:10.1051/aas:2000126. S2CID 14566232.
