= RR Lyrae =

Star in the constellation Lyra

- Illustration of the typical light curve for RR Lyrae

Observation data Epoch J2000 Equinox ICRS
- Constellation: Lyra
- Right ascension: 19^{h} 25^{m} 27.91285^{s}
- Declination: +42° 47′ 03.6942″
- Apparent magnitude (V): 7.06–8.12

Characteristics
- Evolutionary stage: horizontal branch
- Spectral type: A7III–F8III
- U−B color index: +0.172
- B−V color index: +0.181
- Variable type: RR Lyr

Astrometry
Radial velocity (R_{v})	−72.4 km/s
Proper motion (μ)	RA: −109.68 mas/yr Dec.: −195.75 mas/yr
Parallax (π)	3.64±0.23 mas
Distance	900 ± 60 ly (270 ± 20 pc)
Absolute magnitude (M_{V})	0.600±0.126

Details
Mass	0.65 M_{☉}
Radius	5.1 to 5.6 R_{☉}
Luminosity	49±5 L_{☉}
Surface gravity (log g)	2.4±0.2 cgs
Temperature	6125±50 K
Metallicity [Fe/H]	−1.16 dex

Other designations
- RR Lyr, 2MASS J19252793+4247040, NLTT 47799, HD 182989, BD+42°3338, HIP 95497, SAO 48421, LTT 15677

Database references
SIMBAD	data

RR Lyrae is a variable star in the constellation Lyra, figuring in its west near to Cygnus. As the brightest star in its class, it became the eponym for the RR Lyrae variable class of stars and it has been extensively studied by astronomers. RR Lyrae variables serve as important standard candles that are used to measure astronomical distances. The period of pulsation of an RR Lyrae variable depends on its mass, luminosity and temperature, while the difference between the measured luminosity and the actual luminosity allows its distance to be determined via the inverse-square law. Hence, understanding the period–luminosity relation for a local set of such stars allows the distance of more distant stars of this type to be determined.

== History ==
The variable nature of RR Lyrae was discovered by the Scottish astronomer Williamina Fleming at Harvard Observatory in 1901.

The distance of RR Lyrae remained uncertain until 2002 when the Hubble Space Telescope's fine guidance sensor was used to determine the distance of RR Lyrae within a 5% margin of error, yielding a value of 262 parsecs (855 light-years). When combined with measurements from the Hipparcos satellite and other sources, the result is a distance estimate of 258 pc (841 ly).

== Variable star class ==
RR Lyrae-type variable stars (not RR Lyr itself) close to the galactic center from the VVV ESO public survey

This type of low-mass star has consumed the hydrogen at its core, evolved away from the main sequence, and passed through the red giant stage. Energy is now being produced by the thermonuclear fusion of helium at its core, and the star has entered an evolutionary stage called the horizontal branch (HB). The effective temperature of an HB star's outer envelope will gradually increase over time. When its resulting stellar classification enters a range known as the instability strip—typically at stellar class A—the outer envelope can begin to pulsate. RR Lyrae shows just such a regular pattern of pulsation, which is causing its apparent magnitude to vary between 7.06 and 8.12 over a short cycle lasting 0.567 days (13 hours, 36 minutes). Each radial pulsation causes the radius of the star to vary between 5.1 and 5.6 times the Sun's radius.

This star belongs to a subset of RR Lyrae-type variables that show a characteristic behavior called the Blazhko effect, named after Russian astronomer Sergey Blazhko. This effect is observed as a periodic modulation of a variable star's pulsation strength or phase; sometimes both. It causes the light curve of RR Lyrae to change from cycle to cycle. In 2014, Time-series photometric observations demonstrated the physical origin of this effect.

== Other stellar classifications ==
As with other RR Lyrae-type variables, RR Lyrae itself has a low abundance of elements other than hydrogen and helium – what astronomers term its metallicity: It belongs to the Population II category of stars that formed during the early period of the Universe when there was a lower abundance of metals in star-forming regions.

The trajectory of this star is carrying it along an orbit that is close to the plane of the Milky Way, taking it no more than 680 ly (210 pc) above or below this plane. The Blazhko period for RR Lyrae is 39.1 ± 0.3 days. The orbit has a high eccentricity, bringing RR Lyrae as close as 6.80 kly (2.08 kpc) to the Galactic Center at periapsis, and taking it as far as 59.9 kly (18.4 kpc) at apapsis.
