= BL Boötis =

Star in the constellation Boötes

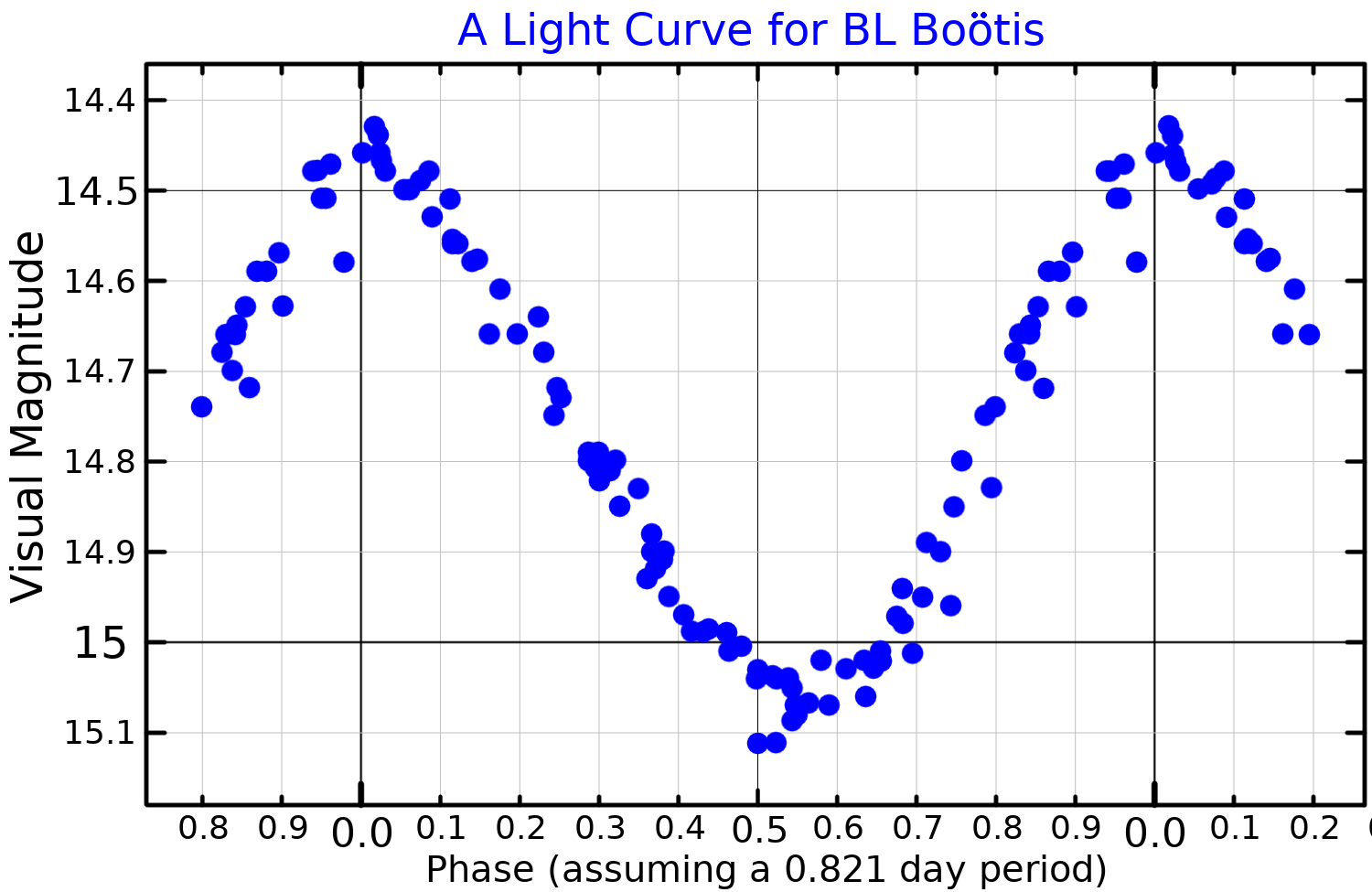
- A visual band light curve for BL Boötes, adapted from Schmidt (2002)

Observation data Epoch J2000 Equinox J2000
- Constellation: Boötes
- Right ascension: 14^{h} 05^{m} 40.463^{s}
- Declination: +28° 29′ 12.28″
- Apparent magnitude (V): 14.45 - 15.10

Characteristics
- Spectral type: kA2/3hA9/F0V
- U−B color index: 0.16 - 0.05
- B−V color index: 0.12 - 0.25
- Variable type: Anomalous Cepheid

Astrometry
Radial velocity (R_{v})	+115 (+90 to +160) km/s
Proper motion (μ)	RA: −5.303 mas/yr Dec.: −0.770 mas/yr
Parallax (π)	0.0114±0.0220 mas
Distance	16,000 pc
Absolute magnitude (M_{V})	−1.27

Details
Mass	1.56 M_{☉}
Radius	11.0 R_{☉}
Luminosity	278 L_{☉}
Surface gravity (log g)	2.22 cgs
Temperature	7,010 K
Metallicity [Fe/H]	−1.92 dex
Rotational velocity (v sin i)	<18 km/s

minimum
Surface gravity (log g)	2.55 cgs
Temperature	6,405 K

Database references
SIMBAD	data

BL Boötis (abbreviated to BL Boo) is a pulsating star in the constellation Boötes. It is the prototype of a class of anomalous Cepheids which is intermediate in the H-R diagram between the type I classical Cepheids and the type II Cepheids.

It varies from magnitude 14.45 to 15.10 over 0.82 days. It is located 4 arcminutes from the centre of (and assumed to be a member star of) the globular cluster NGC 5466. Its variability was first noted in 1961 by Russian astronomer Nikolaĭ Efimovich Kurochkin, who gave it the variable star designation BL Boötis. However, he thought it was an eclipsing binary. It was subsequently thought to be an RR Lyrae variable by T.I. Gryzunova in 1971.

Robert Zinn confirmed it was a member of the globular cluster and found it was too blue to be an RR Lyrae variable. He gave it the name V19 within the cluster. He calculated its mass to be around 1.56 times and its luminosity to be around 278 times that of the Sun; its absolute magnitude is -1.27. The spectrum has been compared to an A2 or A3 main sequence star on the basis of its K lines and A9 or F0 on the basis of its hydrogen lines. The discrepancy is due to a strong deficiency in metals, around 100 times lower than that of the Sun. Despite the spectral classification, it is not thought to be a main-sequence star, at least not a normal one. It is larger and more luminous than its spectrum would indicate, comparable to a horizontal branch star but more massive than comparable stars on the horizontal branch. The pulsations are thought to be in the first overtone.

BL Boötis has been designated the prototype of a rare class of variable star known as an anomalous Cepheid or BL Boötis variable. These stars are somewhat similar to Cepheid variables, but they do not have the same relationship between their period and luminosity. Their periods are similar to the ab subtypes of RR Lyrae variables; however, they are far brighter than these stars. Anomalous Cepheids are metal poor and have masses not much larger than the Sun's, on average, 1.5 solar masses. The origin of these stars is uncertain, but thought to possibly be from the merger of two stars. Detailed examination of the spectrum of BL Boötis with the Keck-1 telescope at the W. M. Keck Observatory showed that its effective (surface) temperature is around 6450 K at minimum light. It also showed that the chemical composition was consistent with ageing metal-poor (Population II) stars and hence cast doubt on the origin as a result of a stellar merger. The radial velocity is lower than would be expected if it were from a stellar merger.
