= HB =

HB or Hb may refer to:

== Media, arts and sciences ==
- HB pencil (hard black), a classification of pencils

=== Arts and media ===
==== Music ====
- HB (band), a Finnish Christian symphonic metal musical group
- Heaven Below, an American rock band

==== Film and television ====
- H. B. Warner (1875–1958), motion picture executive
- Hanna-Barbera, a former American production company
- Helluva Boss, an adult animated television series

=== Academia ===
- H-b index, an extension of the h-index used in determining academic impact
- H-B Woodlawn, a secondary education program in Arlington, Virginia, US
- Hathaway Brown School, an all-girls private school in Shaker Heights, Ohio, US

=== Sciences ===
==== Biology ====
- Heart block, cardiovascular system disease that involves the heart's electrical conduction system
- Hemoglobin (Hb), a group of iron-containing proteins found in most animals, whose primary function is to carry oxygen to the tissues
- Hepatitis B, a human viral infection
- His bundle, a specialized collection of cells in the vertebrate heart

==== Material properties ====
- HB, a flammability rating as set forth in UL 94
- HB, a level in the Brinell scale hardness test

==== Astronomy ====
- Horizontal branch, in astrophysics

== Food, housing, politics, and drink ==
- HB Ice Cream, an Irish brand
- Holland & Barrett (H&B), a UK health food shop chain
- H. B. Reese (1879–1956), candy maker
- Half-board, a housing arrangement in which the host provides only breakfast and dinner meals
- HB Construction, a private US general contractor construction business
- Housing Bureau, a policy bureau of the Government of Hong Kong
- Herri Batasuna, defunct far-left Basque nationalist political party in Spain
- H. B. Acton (1908–1974), political philosopher
- H. B. Higgins (1851–1929), Australian politician
- HB, logo for the Staatliches Hofbräuhaus in München, also Hofbräu München, a brewery owned by the Bavaria government

== Places, transportation, and sports ==
- Hubei (Guobiao abbreviation HB), a province of China
- Hanuabada, a village in Papua New Guinea, known as HB to the locals
- Hermosa Beach, California, a city in southern California, US
- Huntington Beach, California, a city in southern California, US

=== Aviation ===
- Switzerland and Liechtenstein (aircraft registration prefix), distinguished by use of emblems
- Asia Atlantic Airlines (IATA code HB; ceased)
- Greater Bay Airlines (IATA code: HB), an airline based in Hong Kong

=== Rail ===
- Zürich Hauptbahnhof (often shortened to HB), the central train station in Zürich, Switzerland
- Hampton and Branchville Railroad (H&B)

=== Automotive and sports ===
- Bremen (state) (license plate: HB), a German state
- HB (car), a 1920s automobile
- Ford-Cosworth HB engine, a Formula One racing engine
- H. B. Bailey (1936–2003), NASCAR driver
- Handball (disambiguation), a number of sports

==== Player positions ====
- Half-back line, the positions of three players in Australian rules football
- Halfback (American football), an American football position
- Half back (association football), another name for a midfielder

==== Sports teams ====
- Havnar Bóltfelag, a football team in the Faroe Islands
- Herfølge Boldklub, a football team in Denmark
- Holstebro Boldklub, a football team in Denmark

== Other uses ==
- Hasbro, an American toy company
- HB (cigarette), a German brand of cigarettes
- Hamilton Bradshaw, a London-based private equity firm

== See also ==
- Hull and Barnsley Railway (H&BR)
- "2HB", a song by Roxy Music
- HB2, North Carolina House Bill 2
- BH (disambiguation)
- Њ, Nje, a letter of the Cyrillic script
