= HD 20722 =

Star in constellation Eridanus

- Location of HD 20722 (circled)

Observation data Epoch J2000.0 Equinox ICRS
- Constellation: Eridanus
- Right ascension: 03^{h} 18^{m} 44.81575^{s}
- Declination: −41° 09′ 36.1822″
- Apparent magnitude (V): 10.10

Characteristics
- Spectral type: K3/4(III)
- B−V color index: 1.34
- J−H color index: 0.631
- J−K color index: 0.785

Astrometry
Radial velocity (R_{v})	+33.09±0.24 km/s
Proper motion (μ)	RA: 27.498 mas/yr Dec.: −8.497 mas/yr
Parallax (π)	2.6907±0.0184 mas
Distance	1,212 ± 8 ly (372 ± 3 pc)
- Absolute magnitude (M_{V})

Details
Mass	1.594±0.080 M_{☉}
Radius	12.6±0.5 R_{☉}
Luminosity	52.2±1.8 L_{☉}
Surface gravity (log g)	2.27 cgs
Temperature	4,369±87 K
Metallicity [Fe/H]	0.21 dex

Other designations
- CD−41°954, CPD−41°314, HD 20722, HIP 15421, SAO 216256, PPM 307511, TIC 159951596, TYC 7564-422-1, GSC 07564-00422, IRAS F03169-4120, 2MASS J03184482-4109361

Database references
SIMBAD	data

HD 20722 is an orange-hued star surrounded by a possible nebula in the southern constellation of Eridanus. It appears close in the sky to the ring galaxy NGC 1291. With an apparent magnitude of 10.10, it is too faint to be seen by the naked eye, requiring a small telescope to be observed. It is located at a distance of 1,212 light-years (372 parsecs) according to Gaia DR3 parallax measurements, and is receding at a heliocentric radial velocity of +34.30 km/s. The effects of extinction by interstellar dust are negligible.

This is an evolved red giant with a stellar classification of K3/4(III). It has a mass of 1.594 M_{☉} but has expanded to a radius of 12.6 R_{☉}. It radiates 52.2 times the luminosity of the Sun from its inflated photosphere at an effective temperature of 4,369 K (4,096 °C; 7,405 °F). It has been observed by the International Ultraviolet Explorer alongside RS Puppis, a Cepheid variable also surrounded by nebulosity, revealing that both stars had near-ultraviolet spectra for their respective spectral types, resembling those of similar stars without nebulae.

== Possible nebula ==
In 1978, astronomers John Gallagher III and Sidney van den Bergh discovered a peculiar object surrounding HD 20722, when they were combing through a photographic plate centered on NGC 1291 taken by the 4.0 m Víctor M. Blanco Telescope at the Cerro Tololo Inter-American Observatory. They tentatively identified the object as a reflection nebula encasing the star, ellipsoidal in shape and measuring 40" by 30" across, resembling some bipolar nebulae (e.g., CRL 2688). This was unique in that K giants at such a high galactic latitude (b = −57°) had not been known to be associated with nebulosity. However, possibilities that the apparent nebula is actually a background galaxy or a plate flaw have not been excluded.

The presumed existence of the nebula implied an episode of significant mass loss had taken place, something usually not associated with K giants, and two hypotheses were proposed as explanations. Firstly, mass ejection could have been driven by stellar winds in a dying star leaving the asymptotic giant branch to form a planetary nebula, but this would require a high luminosity (absolute magnitude ~−4.5) and thus a very large distance from the galactic plane (4,600 pc). Alternately, the star might have lost mass in a binary system with an unseen, possibly main-sequence secondary, after filling up its Roche lobe as it evolved. This would give a "normal" luminosity (absolute magnitude ~0.5) and a smaller separation from the galactic plane, therefore the latter seems to be the more plausible conclusion. A follow-up study in 1981 yielded an absolute magnitude of 0.7, aligning with the binary hypothesis. Neither a hot or cold component nor prominent emission lines have been detected by UBV photometry.
