= Beta Doradus =

Variable star in the constellation Dorado

- Location of β Doradus (circled)

Observation data Epoch J2000 Equinox ICRS
- Constellation: Dorado
- Right ascension: 05^{h} 33^{m} 37.516^{s}
- Declination: −62° 29′ 23.376″
- Apparent magnitude (V): 3.46 to 4.08

Characteristics
- Spectral type: F4-G4Ia-II
- U−B color index: +0.55
- B−V color index: +0.70
- R−I color index: +0.48
- Variable type: δ Cephei

Astrometry
Radial velocity (R_{v})	+7.2 km/s
Proper motion (μ)	RA: −0.611 mas/yr Dec.: +12.950 mas/yr
Parallax (π)	2.9308±0.1391 mas
Distance	1,110 ± 50 ly (340 ± 20 pc)
Absolute magnitude (M_{V})	−3.91±0.11

Details
Mass	7.7±0.2 M_{☉}
Radius	67.8±0.7 R_{☉}
Luminosity	3,200 L_{☉}
Surface gravity (log g)	1.3 cgs
Temperature	5,445 K
Metallicity [Fe/H]	–0.13 dex
Rotational velocity (v sin i)	0 km/s
Age	42.5±2.7 Myr

Other designations
- β Dor, Beta Doradus, Beta Dor, CD−62 214, CPD−62 487, FK5 212, GC 6944, HD 37350, HIP 26069, HR 1922, SAO 249311, PPM 354837

Database references
SIMBAD	data

Beta Doradus is the second brightest star in the southern constellation of Dorado. Its name is a Bayer designation that is Latinized from β Doradus and abbreviated Beta Dor or β Dor. Readily visible to the naked eye, it is a Classical Cepheid variable, with an apparent visual magnitude that periodically varies between 3.46 and 4.08. Based upon stellar parallax, it is located at a distance of 1,110 light-years (340 parsecs) from the Sun.

== Characteristics ==
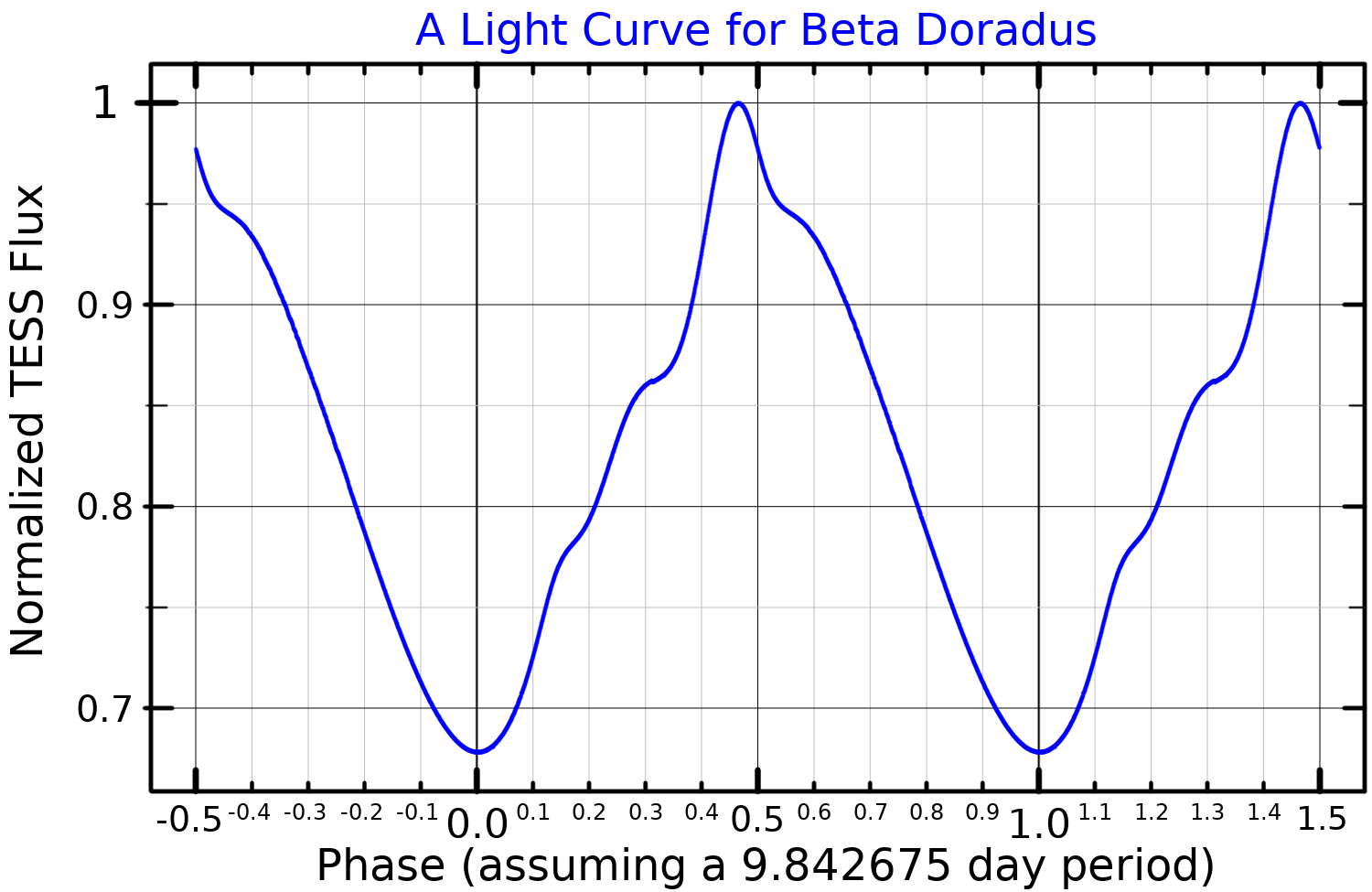
A light curve for Beta Doradus, plotted from TESS data

Beta Doradus is a Cepheid variable that regularly changes magnitude from a low of 4.08 to a high of 3.46 over a period of 9.84318 days. The light curve of this magnitude change follows a nearly regular saw-tooth pattern, with average amplitude variations period to period about 0.005 magnitude from average amplitude of 0.62 magnitude. During each radial pulsation cycle, the radius of the star varies by 3.9 R_{☉} around a mean of 67.8 R_{☉}. Its spectral type and luminosity class are likewise variable, from F-type to G-type and from a supergiant to a bright giant.

Far ultraviolet emissions have been detected from this star with the Far Ultraviolet Spectroscopic Explorer, while X-ray emissions were detected with the XMM-Newton space telescope. The X-ray luminosity is about 1 × 10^{29} erg/s and the emission varies with the pulsation period, suggesting a connection with the pulsation process. The peak X-ray emissions are in the 0.6–0.8 keV energy range, which occurs for plasmas with temperatures of 7–10 million K.
