= H&B =

H&B may refer to:

- Hillerich & Bradsby, an American sporting goods company
- Holland & Barrett, a British health food retailer

== See also ==
- HB (disambiguation)
- HNB (disambiguation)
