= Cepheid variable =

Type of variable star that pulsates radially

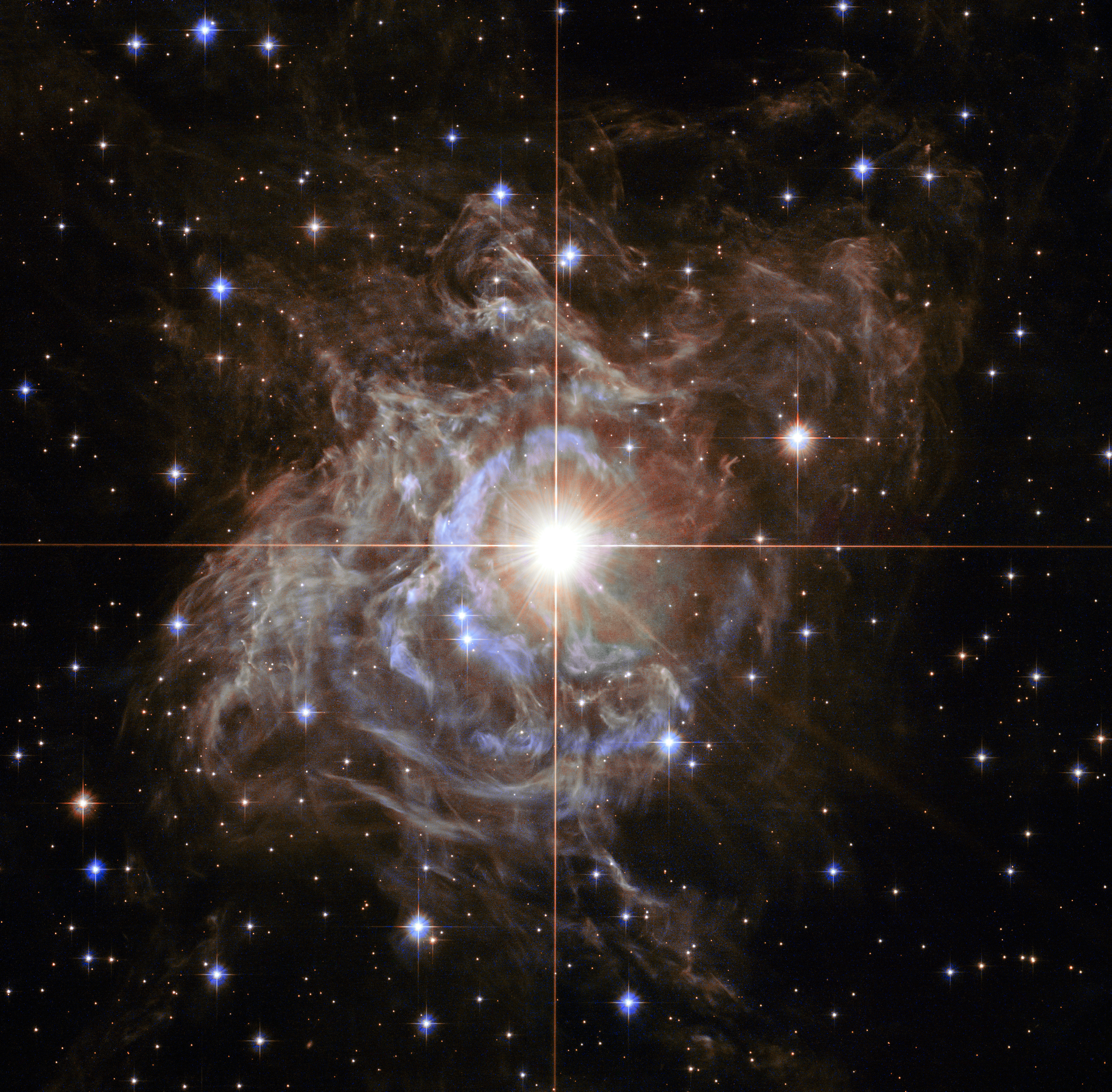
RS Puppis, one of the brightest known Cepheid variable stars in the Milky Way galaxy (Hubble Space Telescope)

A Cepheid variable (/ˈsɛfi.ɪd, ˈsiːfi-/) is a type of variable star that pulsates radially, varying in both diameter and temperature. It changes in brightness, with a well-defined stable period (typically 1–100 days) and amplitude. Cepheids are important cosmic benchmarks for scaling galactic and extragalactic distances; a strong direct relationship exists between a Cepheid variable's luminosity and its pulsation period.

This characteristic of classical Cepheids was discovered in 1908 by Henrietta Swan Leavitt when she studied thousands of variable stars in the Magellanic Clouds. The discovery establishes the true luminosity of a Cepheid by observing its pulsation period. This in turn gives the distance to the star by comparing its known luminosity to its observed brightness, calibrated by direct observation of the parallax distance to the closest Cepheids such as RS Puppis and Polaris.

Cepheids change brightness due to the κ–mechanism, which occurs when the opacity of a star's atmosphere increases with temperature rather than decreasing. The main gas involved is thought to be helium. On this analysis, the Cepheid cycle is driven by the fact that doubly ionized helium, the form found at high temperatures, is more opaque than singly ionized helium. As a result the outer layer of the star cycles between compression and expansion: Compression heats the helium until it becomes doubly ionized. Its opacity when doubly ionized causes the helium to absorb sufficient heat to expand, whereupon it cools until it becomes singly ionized again and, because of its transparency when singly ionized, cools until it collapses. Cepheid variables become dimmest during the part of the cycle when the helium is doubly ionized.

== Etymology ==
The term Cepheid originates from the star Delta Cephei in the constellation Cepheus, which was one of the early discoveries.

== History ==
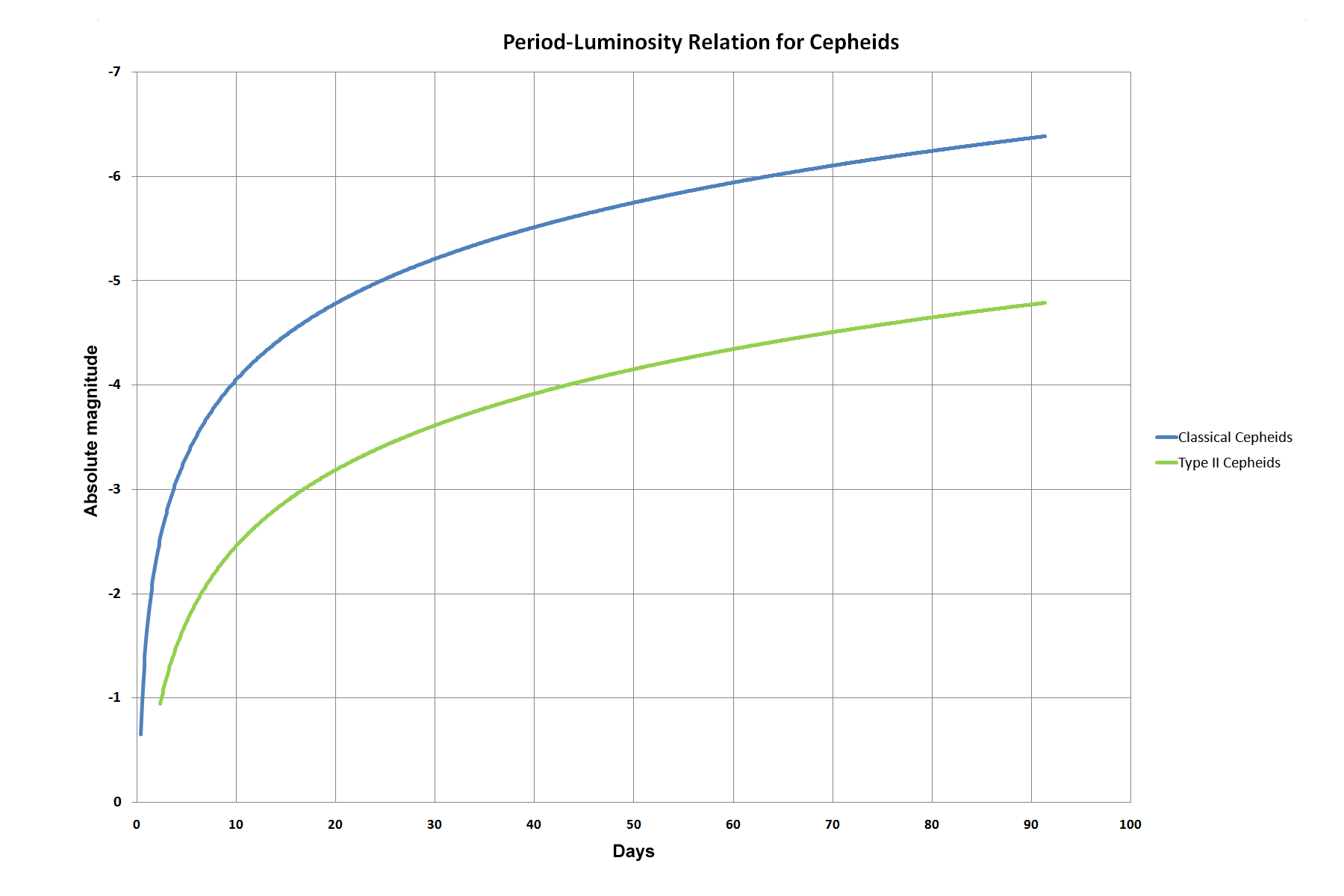
The period–luminosity curves of classic and type II Cepheids

On September 10, 1784, Edward Pigott detected the variability of Eta Aquilae, the first known representative of the class of classical Cepheid variables. The eponymous star for classical Cepheids, Delta Cephei, was discovered to be variable by John Goodricke a few months later. The number of similar variables grew to several dozen by the end of the 19th century, and they were referred to as a class as Cepheids. Most of the Cepheids were known from the distinctive light-curve shapes with the rapid increase in brightness and a hump, but some with more symmetrical light curves were known as Geminids after the prototype ζ Geminorum.

A relationship between the period and luminosity for classical Cepheids was discovered in 1908 by Henrietta Swan Leavitt in an investigation of thousands of variable stars in the Magellanic Clouds. She published it in 1912 with further evidence. Cepheid variables were found to show radial velocity variation with the same period as the luminosity variation, and initially this was interpreted as evidence that these stars were part of a binary system. However, in 1914, Harlow Shapley demonstrated that this idea should be abandoned. Two years later, Shapley and others had discovered that Cepheid variables changed their spectral types over the course of a cycle.

In 1913, Ejnar Hertzsprung attempted to find distances to 13 Cepheids using their motion through the sky. (His results would later require revision.) In 1918, Harlow Shapley used Cepheids to place initial constraints on the size and shape of the Milky Way and of the placement of the Sun within it. In 1924, Edwin Hubble established the distance to classical Cepheid variables in the Andromeda Galaxy (M31), until then known as the "Andromeda Nebula" and showed that those variables were not members of the Milky Way. Hubble's finding settled the question raised in the "Great Debate" of whether the Milky Way represented the entire Universe or was merely one of many galaxies in the Universe.

In 1929, Hubble and Milton L. Humason formulated what is now known as Hubble's law by combining Cepheid distances to several galaxies with Vesto Slipher's measurements of the speed at which those galaxies recede from us. They discovered that the Universe is expanding, confirming the theories of Georges Lemaître.

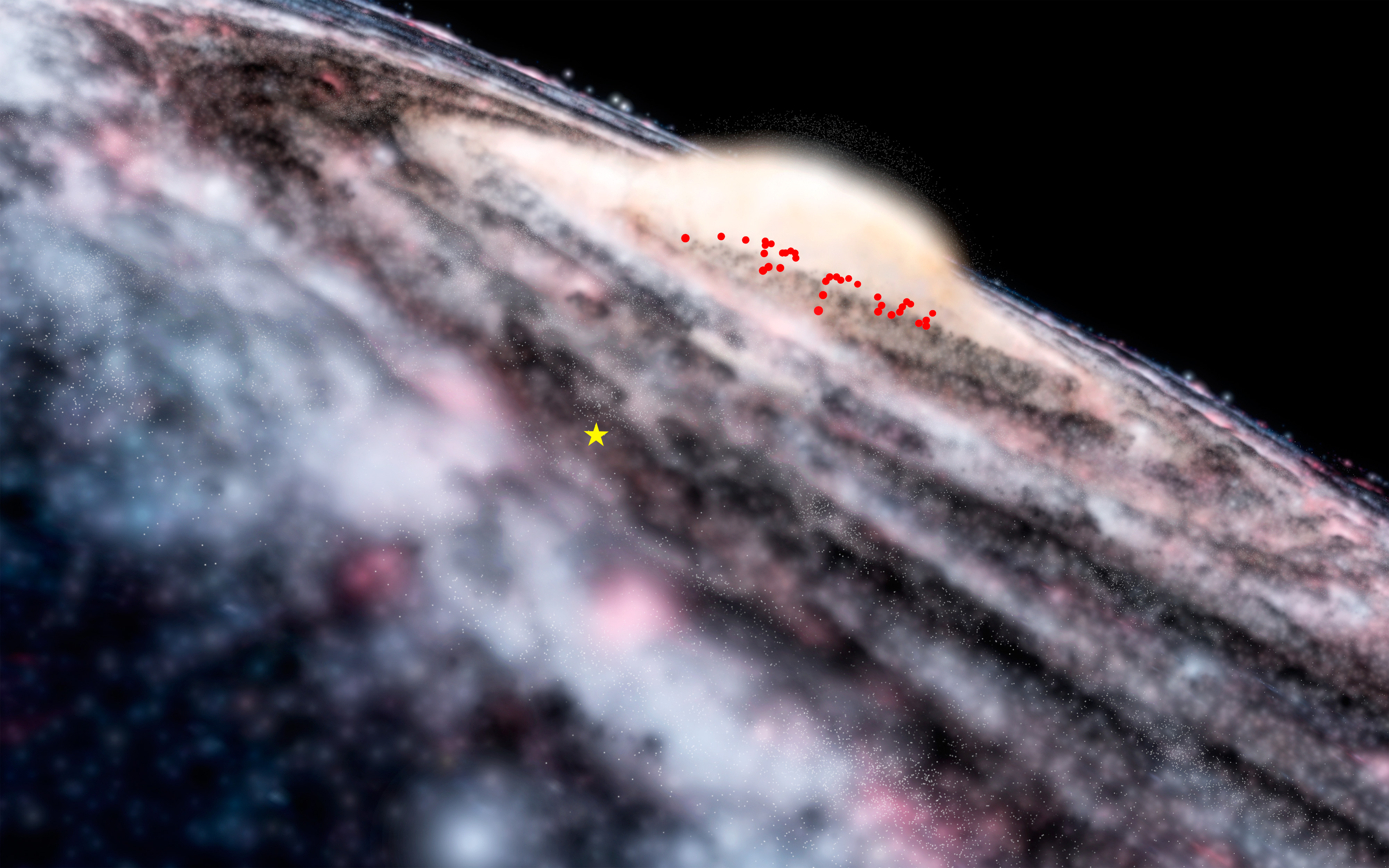
Illustration of Cepheid variables (red dots) at the center of the Milky Way

In the mid-20th century, significant problems with the astronomical distance scale were resolved by dividing the Cepheids into different classes with very different properties. In the 1940s, Walter Baade recognized two separate populations of Cepheids (classical and type II). Classical Cepheids are younger and more massive population I stars, whereas type II Cepheids are older, fainter population II stars. Classical Cepheids and type II Cepheids follow different period–luminosity relationships. The luminosity of type II Cepheids is, on average, less than classical Cepheids by about 1.5 magnitudes (but still brighter than RR Lyrae stars). Baade's seminal discovery led to a twofold increase in the distance to M31 and the extragalactic distance scale. RR Lyrae stars, then known as "cluster variables", were recognized fairly early as being a separate class of variable, due in part to their short periods.

The mechanics of stellar pulsation as a heat engine was proposed in 1917 by Arthur Stanley Eddington (who wrote at length on the dynamics of Cepheids), but it was not until 1953 that S. A. Zhevakin identified ionized helium as a likely valve for the engine.

== Classes ==
Cepheid variables are divided into two subclasses which exhibit markedly different masses, ages, and evolutionary histories: classical Cepheids and type II Cepheids. Delta Scuti variables are A-type stars on or near the main sequence at the lower end of the instability strip and were originally referred to as dwarf Cepheids. RR Lyrae variables have short periods and lie on the instability strip where it crosses the horizontal branch. Delta Scuti variables and RR Lyrae variables are not generally treated with Cepheid variables, although their pulsations originate with the same helium ionisation kappa mechanism.

=== Classical Cepheids ===
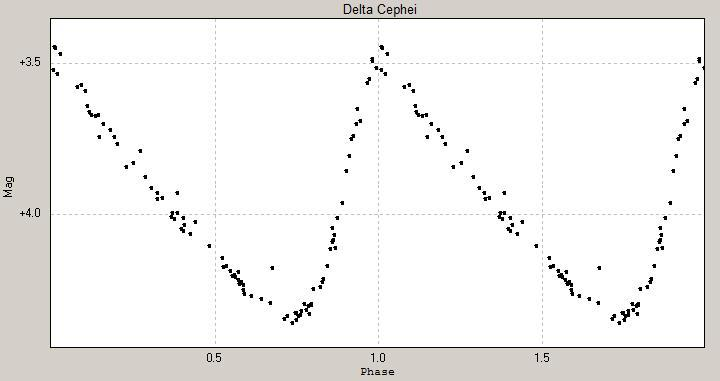
Light curve of Delta Cephei, the prototype of classical cepheids, showing the regular variations produced by intrinsic stellar pulsations

Classical Cepheids (also known as population I Cepheids, type I Cepheids, or Delta Cepheid variables) undergo pulsations with very regular periods on the order of days to months. Classical Cepheids are population I variable stars which are 4–20 times more massive than the Sun, and up to 100,000 times more luminous. These Cepheids are yellow bright giants and supergiants of spectral class F6–K2, and their radii change by millions of kilometers (~25% for the longer-period I Carinae) during a pulsation cycle.

Classical Cepheids are used to determine distances to galaxies within the Local Group and beyond, and are a means by which the Hubble constant can be established. Classical Cepheids have also been used to clarify many characteristics of the Milky Way galaxy, such as the Sun's height above the galactic plane and the Galaxy's local spiral structure.

A group of classical Cepheids with small amplitudes and sinusoidal light curves are often separated out as small-amplitude Cepheids or s-Cepheids, many of them pulsating in the first overtone.

=== Type II Cepheids ===
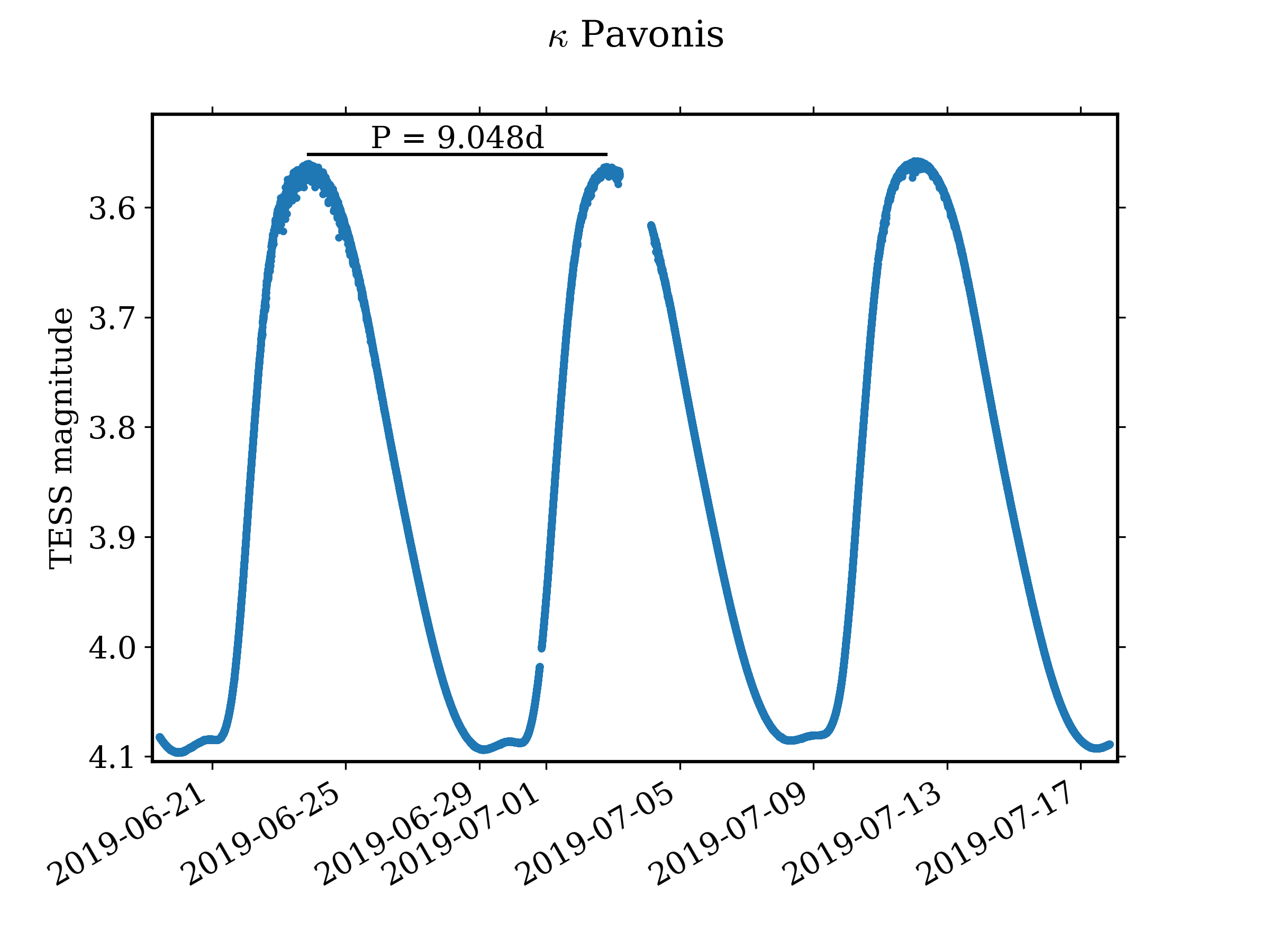
Light curve of κ Pavonis, a type II cepheid, recorded by NASA's Transiting Exoplanet Survey Satellite (TESS)

Type II Cepheids (also termed population II Cepheids) are population II variable stars which pulsate with periods typically between 1 and 50 days. Type II Cepheids are typically metal-poor, old (~10 Gyr), low-mass objects (~half the mass of the Sun). Type II Cepheids are divided into several subgroups by period. Stars with periods between 1 and 4 days are of the BL Her subclass, 10–20 days belong to the W Virginis subclass, and stars with periods greater than 20 days belong to the RV Tauri subclass.

Type II Cepheids are used to establish the distance to the Galactic Center, globular clusters, and galaxies.

=== Anomalous Cepheids ===
A group of pulsating stars on the instability strip have periods of less than 2 days, similar to RR Lyrae variables but with higher luminosities. Anomalous Cepheid variables have masses higher than type II Cepheids, RR Lyrae variables, and the Sun. It is unclear whether they are young stars on a "turned-back" horizontal branch, blue stragglers formed through mass transfer in binary systems, or a mix of both.

=== Double-mode Cepheids ===
A small proportion of Cepheid variables have been observed to pulsate in two modes at the same time, usually the fundamental and first overtone, occasionally the second overtone. A very small number pulsate in three modes, or an unusual combination of modes including higher overtones.

== Uncertain distances ==
Chief among the uncertainties tied to the classical and type II Cepheid distance scale are: the nature of the period–luminosity relation in various passbands, the impact of metallicity on both the zero point and slope of those relations, and the effects of photometric contamination (blending with other stars) and a changing (typically unknown) extinction law on Cepheid distances. All these topics are actively debated in the literature.

These unresolved matters have resulted in cited values for the Hubble constant (established from classical Cepheids) ranging between 60 km/(s⋅Mpc) and 80 km/(s⋅Mpc). Resolving this discrepancy is one of the foremost problems in astronomy, since the cosmological parameters of the Universe may be constrained by supplying a precise value of the Hubble constant. Uncertainties have diminished over the years, due in part to discoveries such as RS Puppis.

Delta Cephei is also of particular importance as a calibrator of the Cepheid period–luminosity relation, since its distance is among the most precisely established for a Cepheid, partly because it is a member of a star cluster and the availability of precise parallaxes observed by the Hubble, Hipparcos, and Gaia space telescopes. The accuracy of parallax distance measurements to Cepheid variables and other bodies within 7,500 light-years is vastly improved by comparing images from Hubble taken six months apart, from opposite points in the Earth's orbit. (Between two such observations 2 AU apart, a star at a distance of 7500 light-years = 2300 parsecs would appear to move an angle of ^{2}/_{2300} arc-seconds = 2×10^{−7} degrees, the resolution limit of the available telescopes.)

== Pulsation model ==
Time lapse of the Cepheid-type variable star Polaris illustrating the visual appearance of its cycle of brightness changes

The accepted explanation for the pulsation of Cepheids is called the Eddington valve, or "κ-mechanism", where the Greek letter κ (kappa) is the usual symbol for the gas opacity.

Helium is the gas thought to be most active in the process. Doubly ionized helium (helium whose atoms are missing both electrons) is more opaque than singly ionized helium. As helium is heated, its temperature rises until it reaches the point at which double ionisation spontaneously occurs and is sustained throughout the layer in much the same way a fluorescent tube "strikes". At the dimmest part of a Cepheid's cycle, this ionized gas in the outer layers of the star is relatively opaque, and so is heated by the star's radiation, and due to the increasing temperature, begins to expand. As it expands, it cools, but remains ionised until another threshold is reached, at which point double ionization cannot be sustained, and the layer becomes singly ionized, hence more transparent, which allows radiation to escape. The expansion then stops and reverses due to the star's gravitational attraction. The star's states are held to be either expanding or contracting by the hysteresis generated by the doubly ionized helium and indefinitely flip-flops between the two states reversing every time the upper or lower threshold is crossed. This process is rather analogous to the relaxation oscillator found in electronics.

In 1879, August Ritter demonstrated that the adiabatic radial pulsation period for a homogeneous sphere is related to its surface gravity and radius through the relation
$$T = k \,\sqrt \frac R g,$$
where k is a proportionality constant. Now, since the surface gravity is related to the sphere mass and radius through the relation
$$g = k' \frac{M}{R^2} = k' \frac{RM}{R^3} = k' R \rho,$$
one finally obtains
$$T \sqrt \rho = Q,$$
where Q is a constant, called the pulsation constant.

== Examples ==
- Classical Cepheids include: Eta Aquilae, Zeta Geminorum, Beta Doradus, RT Aurigae, Polaris, as well as Delta Cephei.
- Type II Cepheids include: W Virginis, Kappa Pavonis and BL Herculis.
- Anomalous Cepheids include: XZ Ceti (overtone pulsation mode) and BL Boötis.
