= MACHO 176.18833.411 =

Variable star

Observation data Epoch J2000 Equinox J2000
- Constellation: Sagittarius
- Right ascension: 18^{h} 00^{m} 13.08^{s}
- Declination: −27° 15′ 39.1″
- Apparent magnitude (V): 17.462

Characteristics
- Variable type: RR Lyrae

Astrometry
Distance	24000±2000 ly (7300±600 pc)

Details
Metallicity [Fe/H]	−1.62 ± 0.2 dex

Other designations
- MACHO 176.18833.411, OGLE BLG-RRLYR-10353

Database references
SIMBAD	data

MACHO 176.18833.411 (OGLE BLG-RRLYR-10353) is an RR Lyrae variable star located in the galactic bulge of our Milky Way Galaxy. However, it is not a galactic bulge star, it is a galactic halo star, which is on the part of its elliptical orbit that brings it within the bulge before returning to the outer parts of the galaxy, the halo. The star is currently located about 850 pc (2,800 ly) from the Galactic Center. As of 2015, this star has the highest velocity of any known RR Lyrae variable located in the bulge, moving at 482 km/s (1,080,000 mph), only slightly below galactic escape velocity, and 5x the average velocity of bulge stars. Its nature was discovered as part of the BRAVA-RR survey.
