= Period–luminosity relation =

Astronomical principle

Period–luminosity relation for classical Cepheid variables

In astronomy, a period–luminosity relation is a relationship linking the luminosity of pulsating variable stars with their pulsation period. The best-known relation is the direct proportionality law holding for classical Cepheid variables, sometimes called the Leavitt law. Discovered in 1908 by Henrietta Swan Leavitt, the relation established Cepheids as foundational indicators of cosmic benchmarks for scaling galactic and extragalactic distances. The physical model explaining the Leavitt's law for classical cepheids is called kappa mechanism.

== History ==
Plot from Leavitt's 1912 paper. The horizontal axis is the logarithm of the period of the corresponding Cepheid, and the vertical axis is its apparent magnitude. The lines drawn correspond to the stars' minimum and maximum brightness.

Leavitt, a graduate of Radcliffe College, worked at the Harvard College Observatory as a "computer", tasked with examining photographic plates in order to measure and catalog the brightness of stars. Observatory Director Edward Charles Pickering assigned Leavitt to the study of variable stars of the Small and Large Magellanic Clouds, as recorded on photographic plates taken with the Bruce Astrograph of the Boyden Station of the Harvard Observatory in Arequipa, Peru. She identified 1777 variable stars, of which she classified 47 as Cepheids. In 1908 she published her results in the Annals of the Astronomical Observatory of Harvard College, noting that the brighter variables had the longer period. Building on this work, Leavitt looked carefully at the relation between the periods and the brightness of a sample of 25 of the Cepheids variables in the Small Magellanic Cloud, published in 1912. This paper was communicated and signed by Edward Pickering, but the first sentence indicates that it was "prepared by Miss Leavitt".

In the 1912 paper, Leavitt graphed the stellar magnitude versus the logarithm of the period and determined that, in her own words,

A straight line can be readily drawn among each of the two series of points corresponding to maxima and minima, thus showing that there is a simple relation between the brightness of the Cepheid variables and their periods.

Using the simplifying assumption that all of the Cepheids within the Small Magellanic Cloud were at approximately the same distance, the apparent magnitude of each star is equivalent to its absolute magnitude offset by a fixed quantity depending on that distance. This reasoning allowed Leavitt to establish that the logarithm of the period is linearly related to the logarithm of the star's average intrinsic optical luminosity (which is the amount of power radiated by the star in the visible spectrum).

At the time, there was an unknown scale factor in this brightness, since the distances to the Magellanic Clouds were unknown. Leavitt expressed the hope that parallaxes to some Cepheids would be measured; one year after she reported her results, Ejnar Hertzsprung determined the distances of several Cepheids in the Milky Way and that, with this calibration, the distance to any Cepheid could then be determined.

The relation was used by Harlow Shapley in 1918 to investigate the distances of globular clusters and the absolute magnitudes of the cluster variables found in them. It was hardly noted at the time that there was a discrepancy in the relations found for several types of pulsating variable all known generally as Cepheids. This discrepancy was confirmed by Edwin Hubble's 1931 study of the globular clusters around the Andromeda Galaxy. The solution was not found until the 1950s, when it was shown that population II Cepheids were systematically fainter than population I Cepheids. The cluster variables (RR Lyrae variables) were fainter still.

== The relations ==
Period–luminosity relations are known for several types of pulsating variable stars: type I Cepheids; type II Cepheids; RR Lyrae variables; Mira variables; and other long-period variable stars.

=== Classical Cepheids ===
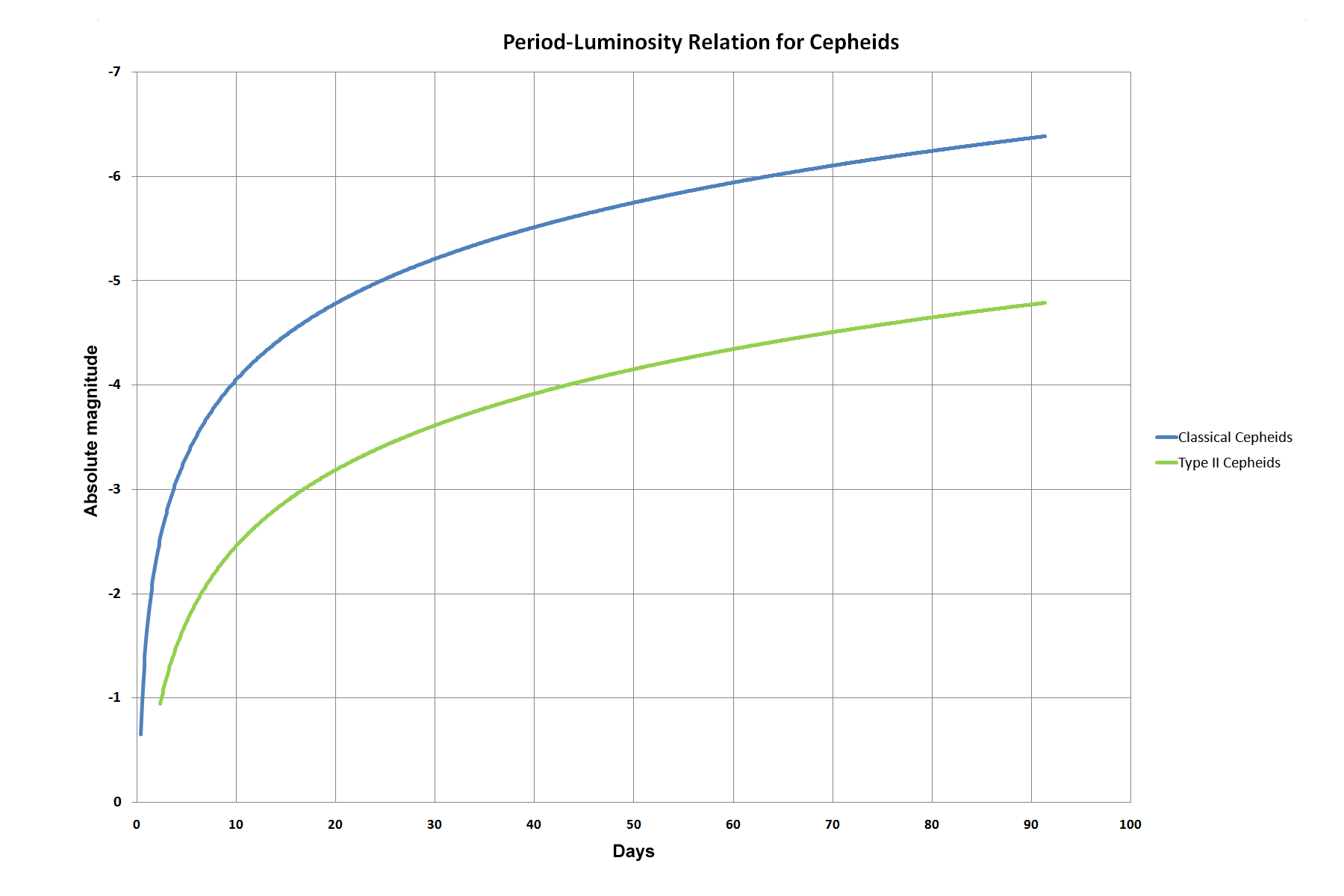
Period–luminosity relation for Cepheids

The classical Cepheid period–luminosity relation has been calibrated by many astronomers throughout the twentieth century, beginning with Hertzsprung. Calibrating the period–luminosity relation has been problematic; however, a firm Galactic calibration was established by Benedict et al. in 2007 using precise HST parallaxes for 10 nearby classical Cepheids. Also, in 2008, ESO astronomers estimated with a precision within 1% the distance to the Cepheid RS Puppis, using light echos from a nebula in which it is embedded, although that latter finding has been actively debated in the literature.

The following relationship between a population I Cepheid's period P and its mean absolute magnitude M_{V} was established from Hubble Space Telescope trigonometric parallaxes for 10 nearby Cepheids:
$$M_\text{V} = (-2.43 \pm 0.12) (\log_{10} P - 1) - (4.05 \pm 0.02),$$
with P measured in days. The following relations can also be used to calculate the distance to classical Cepheids.

== Impact ==
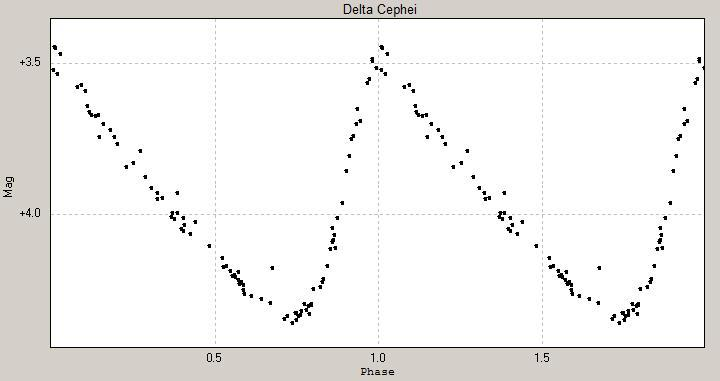
Phase light curve of variable star Delta Cephei

Classical Cepheids (also known as population I Cepheids, type I Cepheids, or Delta Cepheid variables) undergo pulsations with very regular periods on the order of days to months. Cepheid variables were discovered in 1784 by Edward Pigott, first with the variability of Eta Aquilae, and a few months later by John Goodricke with the variability of Delta Cephei, the eponymous star for classical Cepheids. Most of the Cepheids were identified by the distinctive light curve shape with a rapid increase in brightness and a sharp turnover.

Classical Cepheids are 4–20 times more massive than the Sun and up to 100000 times more luminous. These Cepheids are yellow bright giants and supergiants of spectral class F6–K2, and their radii change by of the order of 10% during a pulsation cycle.

Leavitt's work on Cepheids in the Magellanic Clouds led her to discover the relation between the luminosity and the period of Cepheid variables. Her discovery provided astronomers with the first "standard candle" with which to measure the distance to faraway galaxies. Cepheids were soon detected in other galaxies, such as Andromeda (notably by Edwin Hubble in 1923–1924), and became an important part of the evidence that "spiral nebulae" are independent galaxies located far outside of the Milky Way. Leavitt's discovery provided the basis for a fundamental shift in cosmology, as it prompted Harlow Shapley to move the Sun from the center of the galaxy in the "Great Debate", and Hubble to move the Milky Way galaxy from the center of the universe. With the period–luminosity relation providing a way to accurately measure distances on an inter-galactic scale, a new era in modern astronomy unfolded with an understanding of the structure and scale of the universe. The discovery of the expanding universe by Georges Lemaître and Hubble were made possible by Leavitt's groundbreaking research. Hubble often said that Leavitt deserved the Nobel Prize for her work, and indeed she was nominated by a member of the Swedish Academy of Sciences in 1924, although as she had died of cancer three years earlier, she was not eligible (the Nobel Prize is not awarded posthumously).
