= BH =

BH, Bh or bh may refer to:

== Medicine ==
- Bernard-Horner syndrome, a combination of symptoms that arises when a group of nerves known as the sympathetic trunk is damaged
- Borderline hypertensive, an American medical classification for cases where a person's blood pressure is elevated above normal, but not to the level considered hypertension
- Bronchial hyperresponsiveness, a state characterised by easily triggered bronchospasm
- Bundle of His, collection of heart muscle cells specialized for electrical conduction

== Science and technology ==
- BH register, in computer architectures
- Bohrium, symbol Bh, a chemical element
- Boron monohydride, chemical formula BH, a chemical compound
- Black hole

== Places ==
- BH postcode area, a region in southern England served by Bournemouth postal sorting office
- Bahrain (ISO 3166-1 country code BH)
  - .bh, the Internet country code top-level domain for Bahrain
- Belize's WMO and obsolete NATO country code digram
- Belo Horizonte, the capital of Minas Gerais, Brazil
- Beverly Hills, a city in Los Angeles County, California, US
- Bosnia and Herzegovina (reporting mark BiH or B&H)
- Bihor County, Romania
- Bihar, a state of India
- BBC Broadcasting House, headquaters of the BBC, BBC Television, BBC Radio, BBC London, BBC News and BBC World Service

== Businesses ==
- BH (newspaper), Malaysian newspaper
- B&H Rail (reporting mark BH)
- Beistegui Hermanos, a Spanish bicycle manufacturer
- Hawkair (IATA airline code BH)

== Religion ==
- B'ezrat hashem or B"H, Hebrew for "with God's help"
- Brotherhood of Hope, a Catholic association of the faithful
- Before Hijra, years before the epoch of the Islamic calendar

== Other uses ==
- bh (digraph), a digraph in some writing systems
- .bh, the Internet country code top-level domain for Bahrain
- Bihari languages, a group of languages (ISO 639-1 language code bh)
- Broadcasting House (radio programme)
- Before Hijra, years before the epoch of the Islamic calendar
- Blumhouse Productions, also known as BH Productions or simply BH
- Jambi (vehicle registration prefix BH)

== See also ==
- B&H (disambiguation)
- HB (disambiguation)
