= B&H =

B&H may refer to:

== Places ==
- Bosnia and Herzegovina, a country in Southeastern Europe
- Brighton and Hove, a city in England

== Organisations ==
- B&H Airlines of Bosnia and Herzegovina
- B&H Dairy, kosher Jewish dairy restaurant in New York City
- B&H Photo, a photo and video equipment store in the United States
- B&H Publishing Group, or Broadman & Holman, a division of LifeWay Christian Resources
- B&H Rail, formerly the Bath and Hammondsport Railroad, a shortline in upstate New York
- Bell & Howell, a photographic equipment maker, now part of Böwe Bell & Howell
- Benson & Hedges, a British brand of cigarettes
  - Benson & Hedges Cup, a one-day cricket competition held from 1972 to 2002
  - Benson & Hedges Cup (UK Ice Hockey), a name of the Autumn Cup from 1982 until 2000
- B&H, a type foundry by Charles Bigelow and Kris Holmes
- Blood and Honour, an international neo-Nazi organisation
- Boosey & Hawkes, a British music publisher, purported to be the largest specialist classical music publisher in the world
- Breitkopf & Härtel a German music publisher, purported to be the world's oldest music publishing house

== See also ==
- Black and white
- BH (disambiguation)
