= RS Puppis =

Variable star in the constellation Puppis

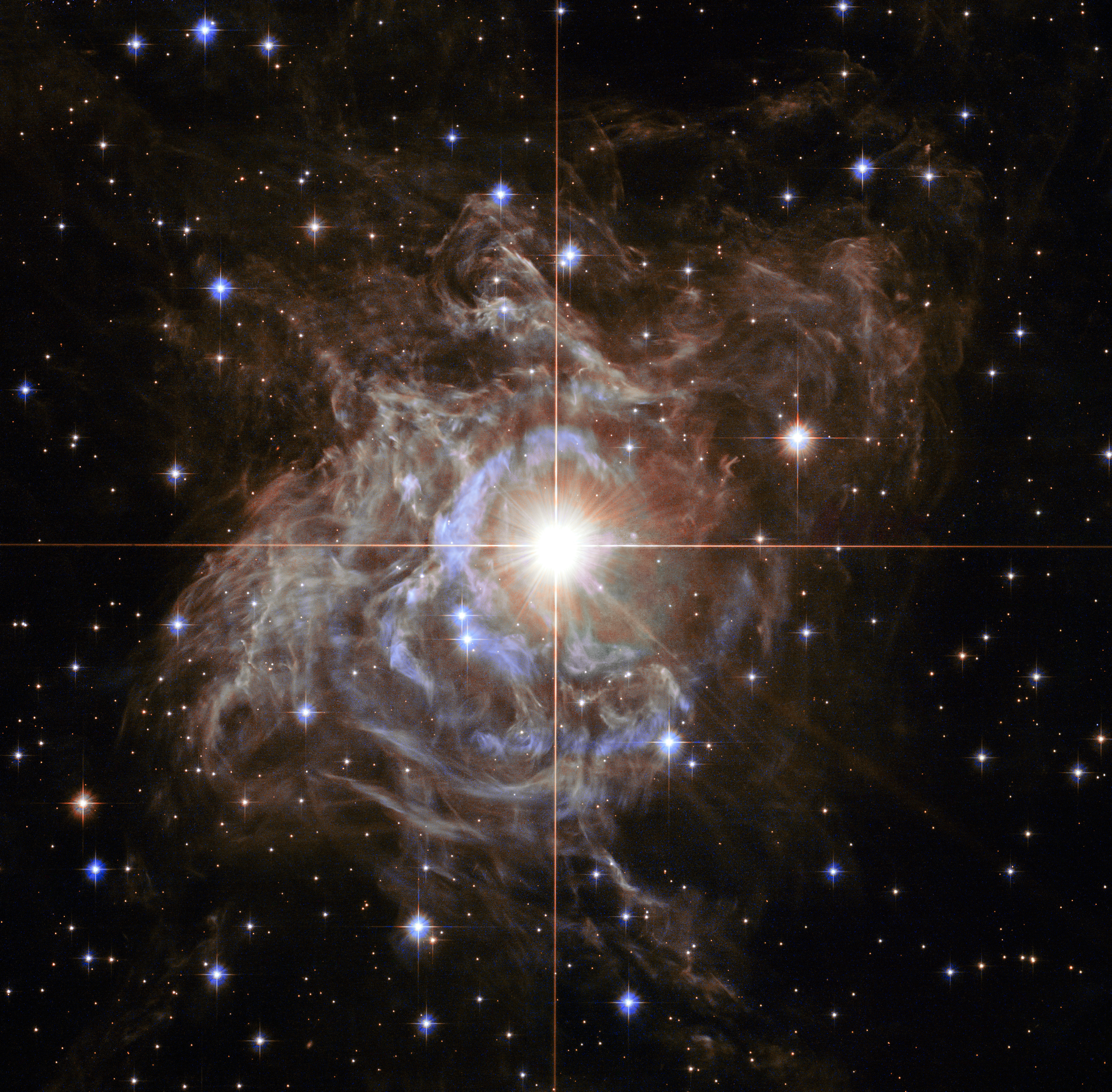
- RS Puppis as imaged by Hubble

Observation data Epoch J2000 Equinox ICRS
- Constellation: Puppis
- Right ascension: 08^{h} 13^{m} 04.21571^{s}
- Declination: −34° 34′ 42.6964″
- Apparent magnitude (V): 6.5-7.6

Characteristics
- Spectral type: G2Ib (F9 - G7)
- U−B color index: 1.2
- B−V color index: 1.5
- Variable type: δ Cep

Astrometry
Radial velocity (R_{v})	24.60 km/s
Proper motion (μ)	RA: −3.518 mas/yr Dec.: +3.126 mas/yr
Parallax (π)	0.5693±0.0172 mas
Distance	5,700 ± 200 ly (1,760 ± 50 pc)
Absolute magnitude (M_{V})	−5.70

Details
Mass	9.2 M_{☉}
Radius	191 (164 - 208) R_{☉}
Luminosity	21,700 (14,200 - 29,500) L_{☉}
Temperature	5,060 (4,640 - 5,850) K
Metallicity [Fe/H]	0.17 dex
Age	28 Myr

Other designations
- HD 68860, HIP 40233, SAO 198944, CD−34°4488

Database references
SIMBAD	data

RS Puppis (or RS Pup) is a Cepheid variable star around 6,000 ly away in the constellation of Puppis. It is one of the biggest and brightest known Cepheids in the Milky Way galaxy and has one of the longest periods for this class of star at 41.5 days.

== Distance ==
The distance to RS Puppis is important because Cepheids serve as a marker for distances within the Milky Way galaxy and for nearby galaxies.

Because it is located in a large nebula, astronomers using the ESO's New Technology Telescope at La Silla Observatory, Chile have been able to measure its distance in 2008 by strictly geometric analysis of light echoes from particles in the nebula, determining it to be 1,992 ± 28 parsecs (6,497 ± 91 ly) from Earth, the most accurate measurement achieved for any Cepheid as of early 2008.

The light echo technique was used again in 2014, this time with Hubble Space Telescope Advanced Camera for Surveys polarimetric images. The distance obtained by these measurements is 1,910 ± 80 parsecs (6,230 ± 260 ly).

In Gaia Data Release 3, a direct geometric parallax of 0.5693±0.0172 mas was derived, corresponding to a distance of 1,760 ± 50 parsecs (5,740 ± 160 ly).

== Variability ==
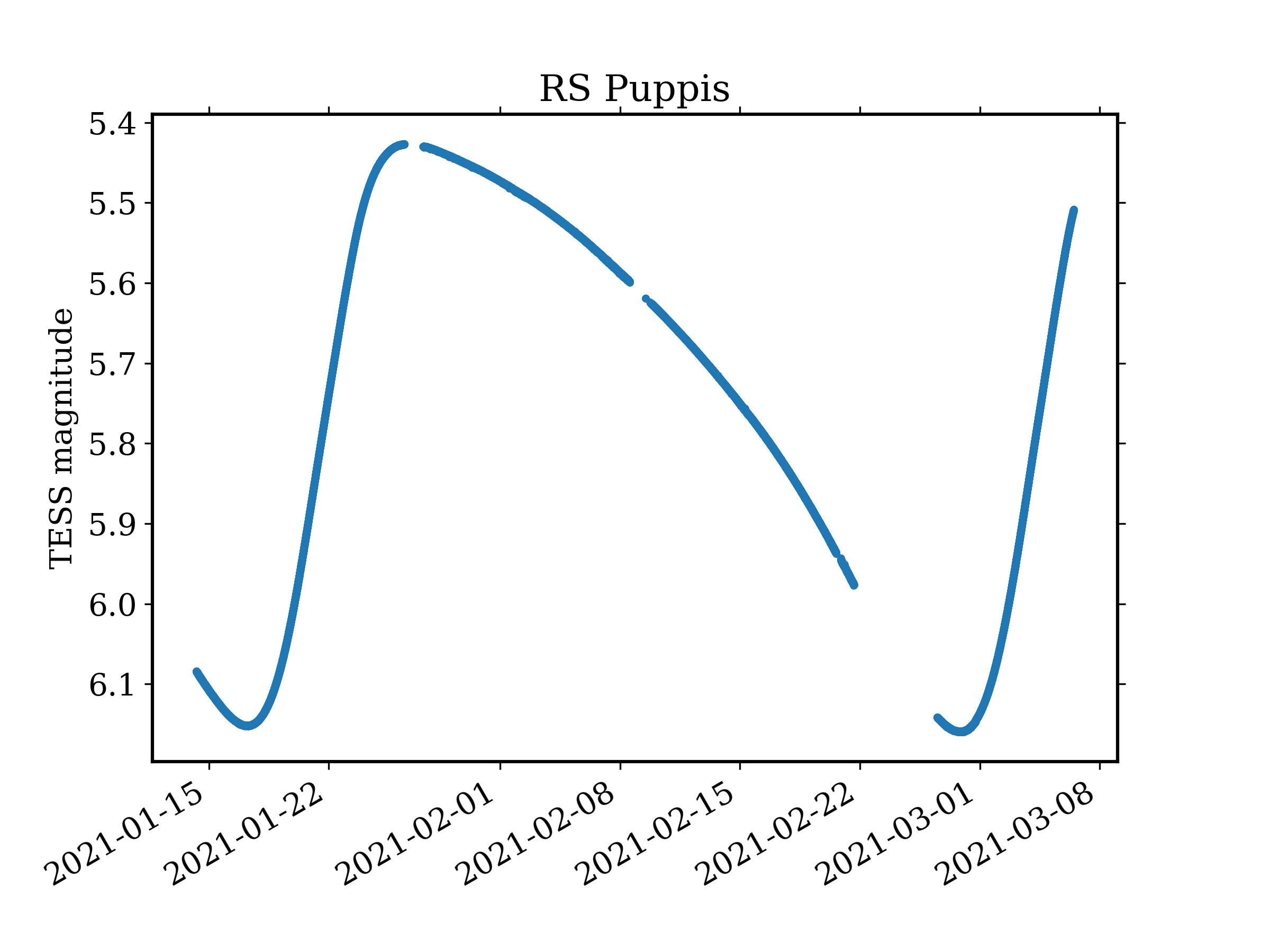
Light curve of RS Puppis recorded by NASA's Transiting Exoplanet Survey Satellite (TESS)

RS Puppis is a classical Cepheid variable and its brightness changes regularly due to pulsations during which its size and temperature both vary. Its visual magnitude changes from 6.52 at maximum to 7.67 at minimum. The light curve shows a rapid rise in brightness with the slower drop in brightness taking about three times as long. It has a regular period of 41.5 days but it changes very slowly and erratically. For example, the period has changed on average by about 144.7 s per year, but has sometimes remained constant for several years.

RS Puppis is considered to be a long-period Cepheid because it has a period longer than 10 days. The only nearer long-period Cepheid is l Carinae. Cepheids closely follow a period–luminosity relationship, with more luminous stars having longer periods. RS Puppis has one of the longest periods of Cepheids in the Milky Way and therefore is also one of the most luminous.

== Properties ==
Light echoes from RS Puppis propagate through its reflection nebula

RS Puppis is a supergiant with a spectral classification of G2Ib, although its spectral type varies between F9 and G7 as its temperature changes. It lies on the instability strip and based on the rate of change of its period is thought to be crossing it for the third time. The third crossing occurs as a star is evolving towards cooler temperatures for the second time after performing a blue loop. The third crossing of the instability strip occurs much more slowly than the first crossing just after a star leaves the main sequence.

RS Puppis pulsates every 41.5 days, during which time its radius, temperature, and luminosity change. Typically for long-period Cepheids, it pulsates in the fundamental mode. The radius varies between 164 R_{☉} and 208 R_{☉}, although the changes vary somewhat even from one cycle to the next. The temperature varies between a minimum of 4,640 K and 5,850 K, and the bolometric luminosity between 14,200 L_{☉} and 29,500 L_{☉}.
