= Sergei Alexandrovich Zhevakin =

Russian astronomer

- Born: April 11, 1916; Moscow Imperial Russia
- Died: February 21, 2001 (aged 84); Nizhny Novgorod Russian Federation
- Citizenship: USSR, Russian Federation
- Education: State University of Gorky
- Known for: pulsation mechanism for variable stars
- Awards: Order of the Red Star, Fyodor Bredikhin Prize, USSR State Prize, Open Society Foundations Professorship
- Scientific career
- Fields: Astronomy
- Workplaces: Radio Physics Institute, Gorky
- Doctoral advisor: Aleksandr Andronov

Sergei Alexandrovich Zhevakin (Russian: Серге́й Александрович Жевакин; April 11, 1916 – February 21, 2001) was a Russian astronomer.

Zhevakin is credited for identifying ionized helium as the valve for the heat engine that drives the pulsation of Cepheid variable stars.

== Early life and education ==
S. A. Zhevakin was born on April 11, 1916, in Moscow. The family moved to Nizhny Novgorod in the late 1920s. Zhevakin graduated from N. I. Lobachevsky State University of Nizhny Novgorod in 1939, and, after two years of working at various local factories, entered a graduate program in 1941. However, because of the invasion of the Soviet Union by Nazi Germany, he was conscripted into the army in July 1941, where he served with distinction until January 1946. Zhevakin was wounded twice.

After returning to graduate school, he defended his thesis in 1949.
