= HNB =

HNB may refer to:

- Croatian National Bank (Croatian: Hrvatska narodna banka)
- Hasnabad railway station, in India
- Hatton National Bank, a Sri Lankan bank
- Heat-not-burn tobacco product, cigarette that heats tobacco to a lower temperature than when a conventional cigarette is burned
- Herne Bay railway station, in England
- Hexanitrobenzene, an explosive compound
- Hockey New Brunswick
- Home Node B, in wireless telecommunications
- Huntingburg Airport, in Indiana, United States
- HNB (band), a South Korean boy band
- Hill, Norman & Beard, an organ building company in England and Australia

== See also ==
- H&B (disambiguation)
