= HB Construction =

Construction company in New Mexico

- Company type: Private, family-owned
- Founded: 1991; 34 years ago
- Founder: Ken Harrington
- Headquarters: Albuquerque, New Mexico, United States
- Number of locations: 5 offices
- Key people: Jason Harrington (CEO) Adam Harrington (CFO)
- Revenue: US$125 million (2016)
- Number of employees: 180 (2018); 116 (2016)
- Website: hbconstruction.com

HB Construction is a private, family-owned construction company, a general contracting firm, based in Albuquerque, New Mexico, founded in 1991 by Ken Harrington. The company's CEO is Jason Harrington.

HB is one of the largest privately owned construction companies in New Mexico. In 2019, the company was ranked sixth in Albuquerque Business First's Top 100 New Mexico Companies. Well-known projects completed by HB Construction include the Albuquerque BioPark Penguin Chill Exhibit, which was awarded Best Sports/Entertainment Project by Engineering News Record Southwest.

In addition to its headquarters in Albuquerque, New Mexico, HB has offices in El Paso, Texas; Lubbock, Texas; San Antonio, Texas; and Las Cruces, New Mexico. Expansion to the San Antonio office was done through acquisition of Reid & Associates in 2018, a general contractor specializing in senior living and industrial projects.

As of 2018, the company had 180 employees.
