= HB (car) =

HB (taken from the initials of the designer Helmer Berglund) was a car made in two or three copies at Berglunds mekaniska verkstad at about 1925. On the prototype they used a three-cylinder engine, but the production models had a four-cylinder engine producing 16 horsepower. The engine was connected to a three-speed transmission. The car was a two-seater, and the design was much inspired by the Thulin A by AB Thulinverken. The company was later renamed to Sörby mekaniska verkstad (SMV) and made travel trailers.
