= Giant star =

Type of star, larger and brighter than the Sun

A giant star has a substantially larger radius and luminosity than a main-sequence (or dwarf) star of the same surface temperature. They lie above the main sequence (luminosity class V in the Yerkes spectral classification) on the Hertzsprung–Russell diagram and correspond to luminosity classes II and III. The terms giant and dwarf were coined for stars of quite different luminosity despite similar temperature or spectral type (namely K and M) by Ejnar Hertzsprung in 1905 or 1906.

Giant stars have radii up to a few hundred times the Sun and luminosities over 10 times that of the Sun. Stars still more luminous than giants are referred to as supergiants and hypergiants.

A hot, luminous main-sequence star may also be referred to as a giant, but any main-sequence star is properly called a dwarf, regardless of how large and luminous it is.

== Formation ==
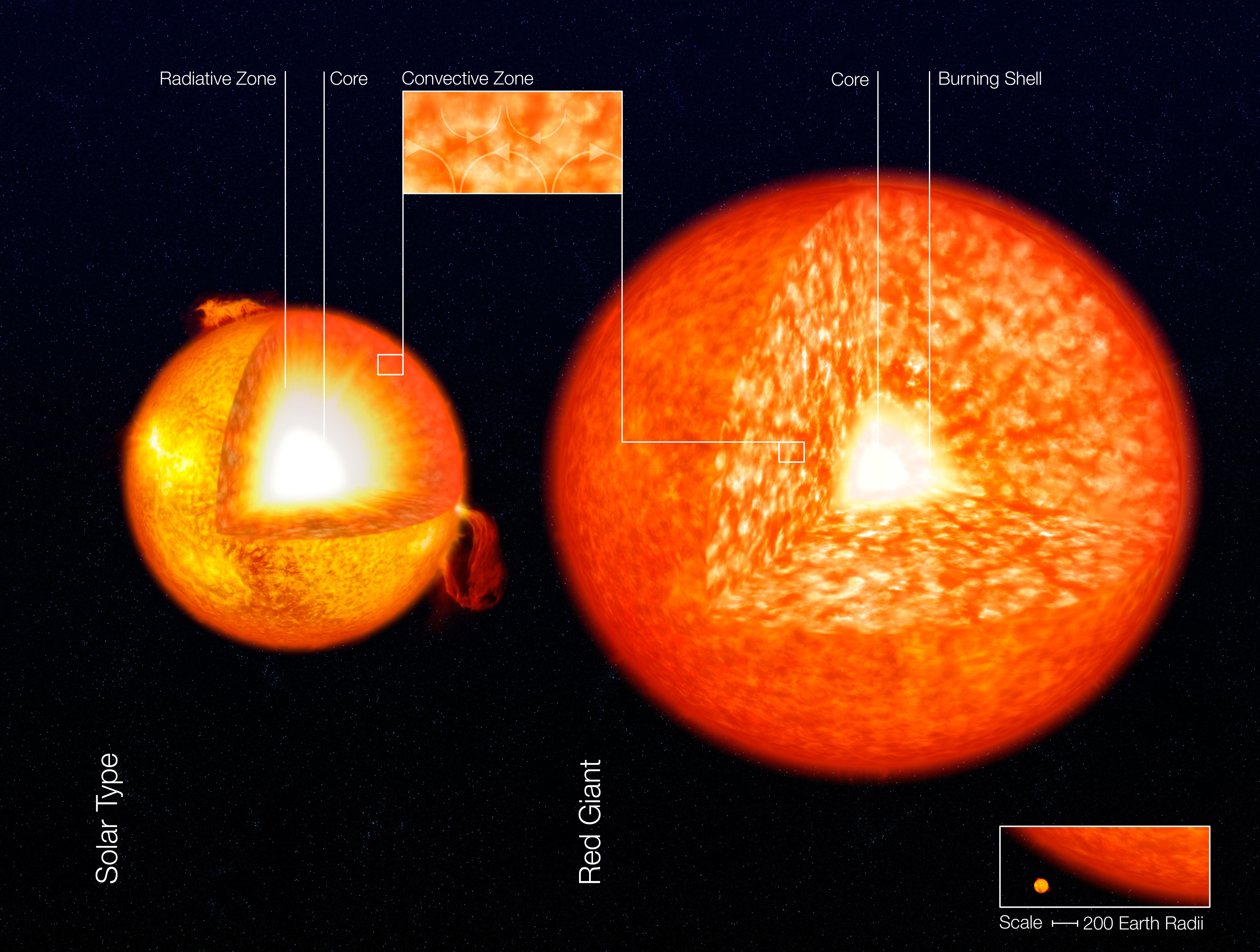
Internal structure of a Sun-like star and a red giant. ESO image.

A star becomes a giant after all the hydrogen available for fusion at its core has been depleted and, as a result, leaves the main sequence. The behaviour of a post-main-sequence star depends largely on its mass.

=== Intermediate-mass stars ===
For a star with a mass above about 0.25 solar masses (M_{☉}), once the core is depleted of hydrogen it contracts and heats up so that hydrogen starts to fuse in a shell around the core. The portion of the star outside the shell expands and cools, but with only a small increase in luminosity, and the star becomes a subgiant. The inert helium core continues to grow and increase in temperature as it accretes helium from the shell, but in stars up to about 10-12 M_{☉} it does not become hot enough to start helium burning (higher-mass stars are supergiants and evolve differently). Instead, after just a few million years the core reaches the Schönberg–Chandrasekhar limit, rapidly collapses, and may become degenerate. This causes the outer layers to expand even further and generates a strong convective zone that brings heavy elements to the surface in a process called the first dredge-up. This strong convection also increases the transport of energy to the surface, the luminosity increases dramatically, and the star moves onto the red-giant branch where it will stably burn hydrogen in a shell for a substantial fraction of its entire life (roughly 10% for a Sun-like star). The core continues to gain mass, contract, and increase in temperature, whereas there is some mass loss in the outer layers.^{, § 5.9.}

If the star's mass, when on the main sequence, was below approximately 0.4 M_{☉}, it will never reach the central temperatures necessary to fuse helium.^{, p. 169.} It will therefore remain a hydrogen-fusing red giant until it runs out of hydrogen, at which point it will become a helium white dwarf.^{, § 4.1, 6.1.} According to stellar evolution theory, no star of such low mass can have evolved to that stage within the age of the Universe.

In stars above about 0.4 M_{☉} the core temperature eventually reaches 10^{8} K and helium will begin to fuse to carbon and oxygen in the core by the triple-alpha process.^{,§ 5.9, chapter 6.} When the core is degenerate helium fusion begins explosively, but most of the energy goes into lifting the degeneracy and the core becomes convective. The energy generated by helium fusion reduces the pressure in the surrounding hydrogen-burning shell, which reduces its energy-generation rate. The overall luminosity of the star decreases, its outer envelope contracts again, and the star moves from the red-giant branch to the horizontal branch.^{, chapter 6.}

When the core helium is exhausted, a star with up to about 8 M_{☉} has a carbon–oxygen core that becomes degenerate and starts helium burning in a shell. As with the earlier collapse of the helium core, this starts convection in the outer layers, triggers a second dredge-up, and causes a dramatic increase in size and luminosity. This is the asymptotic giant branch (AGB) analogous to the red-giant branch but more luminous, with a hydrogen-burning shell contributing most of the energy. Stars only remain on the AGB for around a million years, becoming increasingly unstable until they exhaust their fuel, go through a planetary nebula phase, and then become a carbon–oxygen white dwarf.^{, § 7.1–7.4.}

=== High-mass stars ===
Main-sequence stars with masses above about 12 M_{☉} are already very luminous and they move horizontally across the HR diagram when they leave the main sequence, briefly becoming blue giants before they expand further into blue supergiants. They start core-helium burning before the core becomes degenerate and develop smoothly into red supergiants without a strong increase in luminosity. At this stage they have comparable luminosities to bright AGB stars although they have much higher masses, but will further increase in luminosity as they burn heavier elements and eventually become a supernova.

Stars in the 8~12 M_{☉} range have somewhat intermediate properties and have been called super-AGB stars. They largely follow the tracks of lighter stars through RGB, HB, and AGB phases, but are massive enough to initiate core carbon burning and even some neon burning. They form oxygen–magnesium–neon cores, which may collapse in an electron-capture supernova, or they may leave behind an oxygen–neon white dwarf.

O class main sequence stars are already highly luminous. The giant phase for such stars is a brief phase of slightly increased size and luminosity before developing a supergiant spectral luminosity class. Type O giants may be more than a hundred thousand times as luminous as the sun, brighter than many supergiants. Classification is complex and difficult with small differences between luminosity classes and a continuous range of intermediate forms. The most massive stars develop giant or supergiant spectral features while still burning hydrogen in their cores, due to mixing of heavy elements to the surface and high luminosity which produces a powerful stellar wind and causes the star's atmosphere to expand.

=== Low-mass stars ===
A star whose initial mass is less than approximately 0.25 M_{☉} will not become a giant star at all. For most of their lifetimes, such stars have their interior thoroughly mixed by convection and so they can continue fusing hydrogen for a time in excess of 10^{12} years, much longer than the current age of the Universe. They steadily become hotter and more luminous throughout this time. Eventually they do develop a radiative core, subsequently exhausting hydrogen in the core and burning hydrogen in a shell surrounding the core. (Stars with a mass in excess of 0.16 M_{☉} may expand at this point, but will never become very large.) Shortly thereafter, the star's supply of hydrogen will be completely exhausted and it is expected to become a helium white dwarf, although the universe is too young for any such star to exist yet, so no star with that history has ever been observed.

== Subclasses ==
There are a wide range of giant-class stars and several subdivisions are commonly used to identify smaller groups of stars.

=== Subgiants ===
Subgiants are an entirely separate spectroscopic luminosity class (IV) from giants, but share many features with them. Although some subgiants are simply over-luminous main-sequence stars due to chemical variation or age, others are a distinct evolutionary track towards true giants.

Examples:

- Gamma Geminorum (γ Gem), an A-type subgiant;
- Eta Bootis (η Boo), a G-type subgiant.
- Delta Scorpii (δ Sco), a B-type subgiant.

=== Bright giants ===
Bright giants are stars of luminosity class II in the Yerkes spectral classification. These are stars which straddle the boundary between ordinary giants and supergiants, based on the appearance of their spectra. The bright giant luminosity class was first defined in 1943.

Well known stars which are classified as bright giants include:

- Canopus
- Albireo
- Theta Scorpii
- Beta Draconis
- Alpha Herculis
- Gamma Canis Majoris

=== Red giants ===
Within any giant luminosity class, the cooler stars of spectral class K, M, S, and C, (and sometimes some G-type stars) are called red giants. Red giants include stars in a number of distinct evolutionary phases of their lives: a main red-giant branch (RGB); a red horizontal branch or red clump; the asymptotic giant branch (AGB), although AGB stars are often large enough and luminous enough to get classified as supergiants; and sometimes other large cool stars such as immediate post-AGB stars. The RGB stars are by far the most common type of giant star due to their moderate mass, relatively long stable lives, and luminosity. They are the most obvious grouping of stars after the main sequence on most HR diagrams, although white dwarfs are more numerous but far less luminous.

Examples:

- Pollux, a K-type giant.
- Epsilon Ophiuchi, a G-type red giant.
- Arcturus (α Boötis), a K-type giant.
- Aldebaran, a K-type giant
- R Doradus, a M-type giant.
- Mira (ο Ceti), an M-type giant and prototype Mira variable.
- Chi Cygni, a S-type giant.
- TX Piscium, a C-type giant (carbon star).

=== Yellow giants ===
Giant stars with intermediate temperatures (spectral class G, F, and at least some A) are called yellow giants. They are far less numerous than red giants, partly because they only form from stars with somewhat higher masses, and partly because they spend less time in that phase of their lives. However, they include a number of important classes of variable stars. High-luminosity yellow stars are generally unstable, leading to the instability strip on the HR diagram where the majority of stars are pulsating variables. The instability strip reaches from the main sequence up to hypergiant luminosities, but at the luminosities of giants there are several classes of pulsating variable stars:

- RR Lyrae variables, pulsating horizontal-branch class A (sometimes F) stars with periods less than a day and amplitudes of a magnitude of less;
- W Virginis variables, more-luminous pulsating variables also known as type II Cepheids, with periods of 10–20 days;
- Type I Cepheid variables, more luminous still and mostly supergiants, with even longer periods;
- Delta Scuti variables, includes subgiant and main-sequence stars.

Yellow giants may be moderate-mass stars evolving for the first time towards the red-giant branch, or they may be more evolved stars on the horizontal branch. Evolution towards the red-giant branch for the first time is very rapid, whereas stars can spend much longer on the horizontal branch. Horizontal-branch stars, with more heavy elements and lower mass, are more unstable.

Examples:

- Sigma Octantis (σ Octantis), an F-type giant and a Delta Scuti variable;
- Capella Aa (α Aurigae Aa), a G-type giant.
- Beta Corvi (β Corvi), a G-type bright giant.

=== Blue (and sometimes white) giants ===
The hottest giants, of spectral classes O, B, and sometimes early A, are called blue giants. Sometimes A- and late-B-type stars may be referred to as white giants due to higher B-Vs (see for K to B-V to RGB).

The blue giants are a very heterogeneous grouping, ranging from high-mass, high-luminosity stars just leaving the main sequence to low-mass, horizontal-branch stars. Higher-mass stars leave the main sequence to become blue giants, then bright blue giants, and then blue supergiants, before expanding into red supergiants, although at the very highest masses the giant stage is so brief and narrow that it can hardly be distinguished from a blue supergiant.

Lower-mass, core-helium-burning stars evolve from red giants along the horizontal branch and then back again to the asymptotic giant branch, and depending on mass and metallicity they can become blue giants. It is thought that some post-AGB stars experiencing a late thermal pulse can become peculiar blue giants.

Examples:

- Meissa (λ Orionis A), an O-type giant.
- Alcyone (η Tauri), a B-type giant, the brightest star in the Pleiades;
- Thuban (α Draconis), an A-type giant.

== See also ==
- List of nearest giant stars
