= RR Lyrae variable =

Type of variable star

The RR Lyrae variable stars fall in a particular area on a Hertzsprung–Russell diagram of color versus brightness.

RR Lyrae variables are periodic variable stars, commonly found in globular clusters and other old stellar populations in galaxies. They are used as standard candles to measure (extra)galactic distances, assisting with the cosmic distance ladder. This class is named after the prototype and brightest example, RR Lyrae.

They are pulsating horizontal branch stars of spectral class A or F, with a mass of around half the Sun's. They are thought to have shed mass during the red-giant branch phase and were once stars at around 0.8 solar masses.

In contemporary astronomy, a period–luminosity relation makes them good standard candles for relatively nearby targets, especially within the Milky Way and Local Group. They are also frequent subjects in the studies of globular clusters and the chemistry (and quantum mechanics) of older stars.

== Discovery and recognition ==
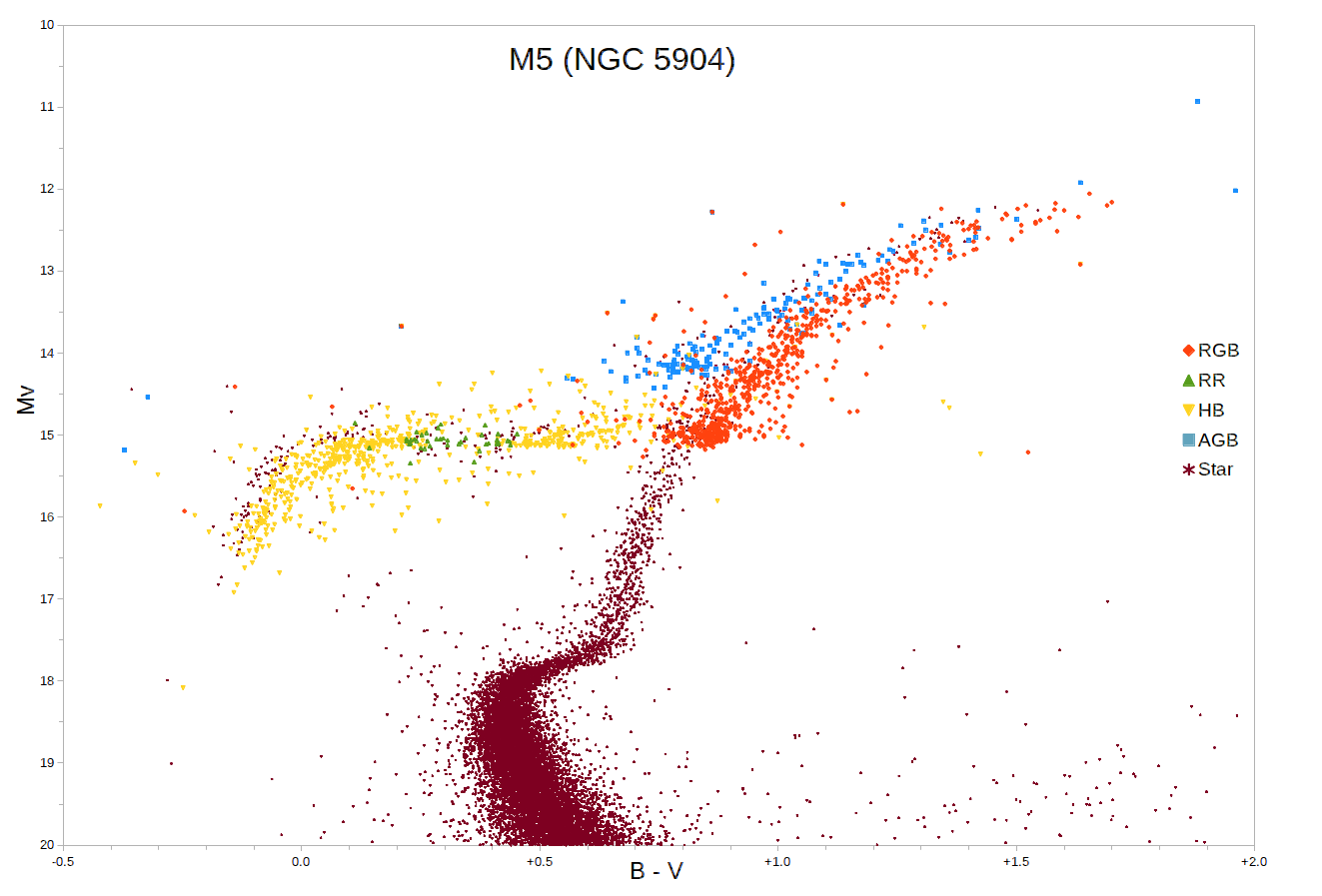
HR diagram for globular cluster M5, with the horizontal branch marked in yellow and known RR Lyrae stars in green

In surveys of globular clusters, these "cluster-type" variables were being rapidly identified in the mid-1890s, especially by E. C. Pickering. Probably the first star definitely of RR Lyrae type found outside a cluster was U Leporis, discovered by J. Kapteyn in 1890. The prototype star RR Lyrae was discovered prior to 1899 by Williamina Fleming and reported by Pickering in 1900 as "indistinguishable from cluster-type variables".

From 1915 to the 1930s, RR Lyrae variables became increasingly accepted as a class of star distinct from the classical Cepheids, due to their shorter periods, differing locations within the galaxy, and chemical differences. RR Lyrae variables are metal-poor, population II stars.

RR Lyraes have proven difficult to observe in external galaxies because of their intrinsic faintness. (In fact, Walter Baade's failure to find them in the Andromeda Galaxy led him to suspect that the galaxy was much farther away than predicted, to reconsider the calibration of Cepheid variables, and to propose the concept of stellar populations.) Using the Canada–France–Hawaii Telescope in the 1980s, Pritchet and Van Den Bergh found RR Lyrae variables in the Andromeda Galaxy's galactic halo. More recently, observations with the Hubble Space Telescope found them in its globular clusters.

== Classification ==
The RR Lyrae stars are conventionally divided into three main types, following classification by S. I. Bailey based on the shape of the stars' brightness curves:

- RRab variables are the most common, making up 91% of all observed RR Lyrae, and display the steep rises in brightness typical of RR Lyrae.
- RRc are less common, making up 9% of observed RR Lyrae, and have shorter periods and more sinusoidal variation.
- RRd are rare, making up between <1% and 30% of RR Lyrae in a system, and are double-mode pulsators, unlike RRab and RRc.

== Distribution ==
RR Lyrae-type variable stars close to the galactic center from the VVV ESO public survey

RR Lyrae stars were formerly called "cluster variables" because of their strong (but not exclusive) association with globular clusters; conversely, over 80% of all variables known in globular clusters are RR Lyraes. RR Lyrae stars are found at all galactic latitudes, as opposed to classical Cepheids, which are strongly associated with the galactic plane.

Because of their old age, RR Lyraes are commonly used to trace certain populations in the Milky Way, including the halo and thick disk.

Several times as many RR Lyraes are known as all Cepheids combined; in the 1980s, about 1900 were known in globular clusters. Some estimates have about 85000 in the Milky Way.

Though binary star systems are common for typical stars, RR Lyraes are very rarely observed in binaries.

== Properties ==
RR Lyrae stars pulse in a manner similar to Cepheid variables, but the nature and histories of these stars is thought to be rather different. Like all variables on the Cepheid instability strip, pulsations are caused by the κ-mechanism, when the opacity of ionised helium varies with its temperature.

RR Lyraes are old, relatively low-mass, population II stars, in common with W Virginis and BL Herculis variables, the type II Cepheids. Classical Cepheid variables are higher-mass population I stars. RR Lyrae variables are much more common than Cepheids, but also much less luminous. The average absolute magnitude of an RR Lyrae star is about +0.75, only 40 or 50 times brighter than the Sun. Their period is shorter, typically less than one day, sometimes ranging down to seven hours. Some RRab stars, including RR Lyrae itself, exhibit the Blazhko effect in which there is a conspicuous phase and amplitude modulation.

== Period-luminosity relationships ==
Typical RR Lyrae light curve

Unlike Cepheid variables, RR Lyrae variables do not follow a strict period–luminosity relationship at visual wavelengths, although they do in the infrared K band. They are normally analysed using a period–colour relationship, for example, using a Wesenheit function. In this way, they can be used as standard candles for distance measurements, although there are difficulties with the effects of metallicity, faintness, and blending. The effect of blending can impact RR Lyrae variables sampled near the cores of globular clusters, which are so dense that in low-resolution observations multiple (unresolved) stars may appear as a single target. Thus the brightness measured for that seemingly single star (e.g., an RR Lyrae variable) is erroneously too bright, given those unresolved stars contributed to the brightness determined. Consequently, the computed distance is wrong, and certain researchers have argued that the blending effect can introduce a systematic uncertainty into the cosmic distance ladder and may bias the estimated age of the Universe and the Hubble constant.

== Recent developments ==
The Hubble Space Telescope has identified several RR Lyrae candidates in globular clusters of the Andromeda Galaxy and has measured the distance to the prototype star RR Lyrae.

The Kepler space telescope provided accurate photometric coverage of a single field at regular intervals over an extended period. 37 known RR Lyrae variables lie within the Kepler field, including RR Lyrae itself, and new phenomena such as period-doubling have been detected.

The Gaia mission mapped 140784 RR Lyrae stars, of which 50220 were not previously known to be variable, and for which 54272 interstellar absorption estimates are available.

The Pan-STARRS1 (PS1) 3π survey identified ~45000 RR Lyrae stars, representing the widest (covering 3/4 of the sky) and deepest (reaching up to 120 kpc) sample of RR Lyrae stars to date. In 2017, Sesar et al. used these stars to develop a novel template-fitting technique, achieving highly accurate period estimates with precision better than 2 seconds in over 80% of cases.

The Dark Energy Survey (DES) was used to identify ~6000 RR Lyrae candidates in the southern sky, ~31% of which were previously undiscovered. The survey also improved period–luminosity relations, advancing distance measurements and studies of galactic structure.

Feng et al. (2024) used deep imaging from the Next Generation Virgo Cluster Survey (NGVS) to identify 180 faint RRvLyrae candidates located at galactocentric distances of roughly 20–300 kpc, extending well into the outer Milky Way halo. About 100 of these sources were previously uncataloged in PS1.

RR Lyrae pulsational parameters from the DES, PS1 and the Next Generation Virgo Cluster Survey were validated and refined using the Hyper Suprime-Cam Subaru Strategic Survey. Keck II's ESI spectrograph was also used to analyze spectra of distant Milky Way halo RR Lyrae candidates to identify background quasar contaminants in previously mentioned surveys.
