= NGC 288 =

Globular cluster in the constellation Sculptor

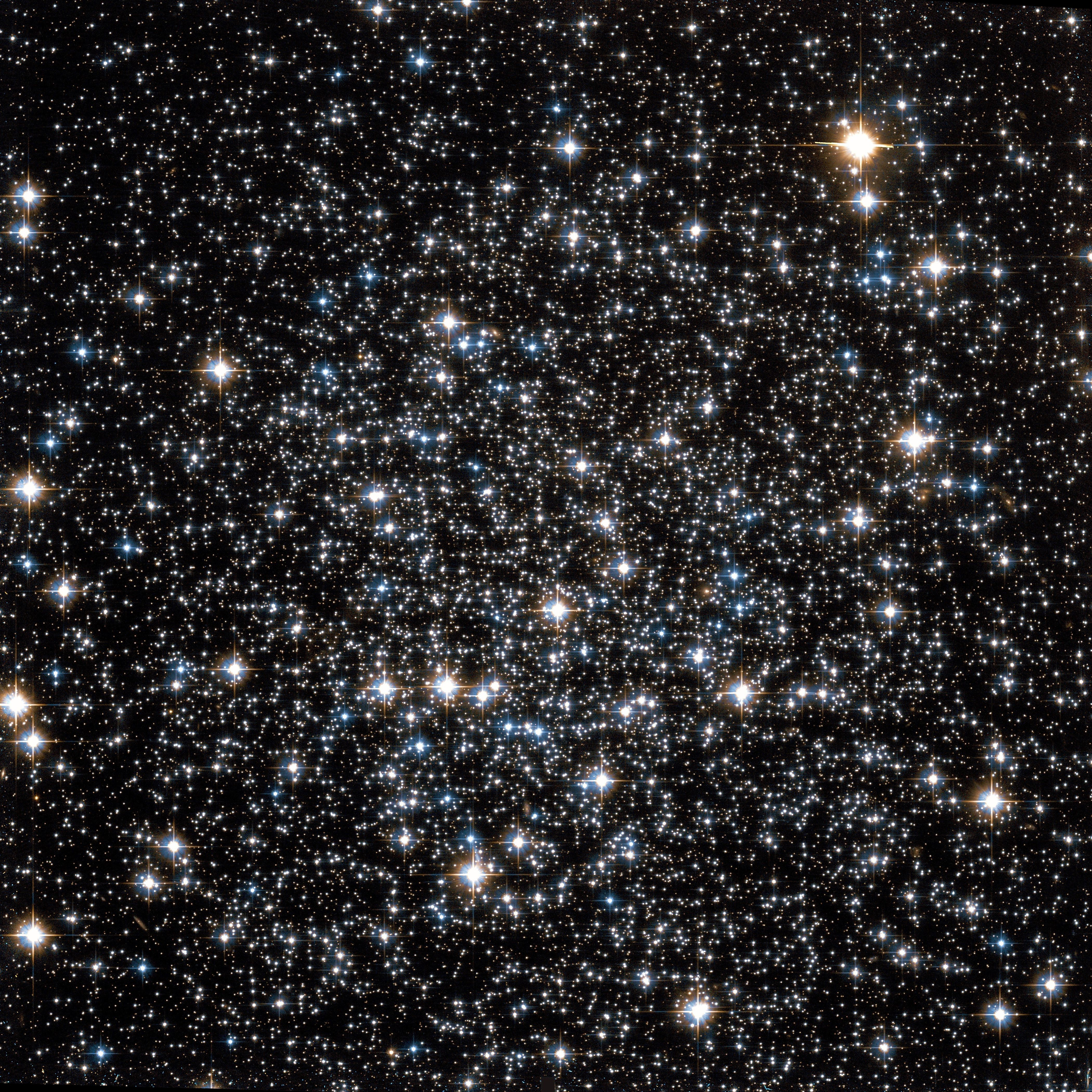
- NGC 288 by Hubble Space Telescope's Wide Field Channel of the Advanced Camera for Surveys

Observation data (J2000 epoch)
- Class: X
- Constellation: Sculptor
- Right ascension: 00^{h} 52^{m} 45.24^{s}
- Declination: –26° 34′ 57.4″
- Distance: 29.22 ± 0.16 kly (8.96 ± 0.05 kpc)
- Apparent magnitude (V): 9.37
- Apparent dimensions (V): 13′.8

Physical characteristics
- Mass: 4.8×10^{4} M_{☉}
- Metallicity: [Fe/H] = –1.14 dex
- Estimated age: 13.5 ± 1.1 Gyr
- Other designations: Melotte 3

NGC 288 is a globular cluster in the constellation Sculptor. Its visual appearance was described by John Dreyer in 1888. It is located about 1.8° southeast of the galaxy NGC 253, 37′ north-northeast of the South Galactic Pole, 15′ south-southeast of a 9th magnitude star, and encompassed by a half-circular chain of stars that opens on its southwest side. It can be observed through binoculars. It is not very concentrated and has a well resolved, large 3′ dense core that is surrounded by a much more diffuse and irregular 9′ diameter ring. Peripheral members extend farther outward towards the south and especially southwest.

NGC 288 is located in our galaxy’s Galactic halo and exhibits both leading and trailing tails.
