= Kappa mechanism =

Cause of changes in luminosity in pulsating variable stars

The kappa opacity mechanism (κ-mechanism) is the driving mechanism behind the changes in luminosity of many types of pulsating variable stars. The term Eddington valve has been used for this mechanism, but this is increasingly obsolete.

Here, the Greek letter kappa (κ) is used to indicate the radiative opacity at any particular depth of the stellar atmosphere. In a normal star, an increase in compression of the atmosphere causes an increase in temperature and density; this produces a decrease in the opacity of the atmosphere, allowing energy to escape more rapidly. The result is an equilibrium condition where temperature and pressure are maintained in a balance. However, in cases where the opacity increases with temperature, the atmosphere becomes unstable against pulsations. If a layer of a stellar atmosphere moves inward, it becomes denser and more opaque, causing heat flow to be checked. In return, this heat increase causes a build-up of pressure that pushes the layer back out again. The result is a cyclic process as the layer repeatedly moves inward and then is forced back out again.

Stellar non-adiabatic pulsation resulting from the κ-mechanism occurs in regions where hydrogen and helium are partly ionized, or where there are negative hydrogen ions. An example of such a zone is in RR Lyrae variables where the partial second ionization of helium occurs. Hydrogen ionization is most likely the cause of pulsation activity in Mira variables, rapidly oscillating Ap stars (roAp) and ZZ Ceti variables. In Beta Cephei variables, stellar pulsations occur at a depth where the temperature reaches approximately 200,000 K and there is an abundance of iron. The increase in the opacity of iron at this depth is known as the Z bump, where Z is the astronomical symbol for "metals" – elements other than hydrogen and helium.
