= Instability strip =

Region of an astronomical diagram

The unqualified term instability strip usually refers to a region of the Hertzsprung–Russell diagram largely occupied by several related classes of pulsating variable stars: Delta Scuti variables, SX Phoenicis variables, and rapidly oscillating Ap stars (roAps) near the main sequence; RR Lyrae variables where it intersects the horizontal branch; and the Cepheid variables where it crosses the supergiants.

RV Tauri variables are also often considered to lie on the instability strip, occupying the area to the right of the brighter Cepheids (at lower temperatures), since their stellar pulsations are attributed to the same mechanism.

== Position on the HR diagram ==
HR diagram for pulsating stars

The Hertzsprung–Russell diagram plots the real luminosity of stars against their effective temperature (their color, given by the temperature of their photosphere). The instability strip intersects the main sequence, (the prominent diagonal band that runs from the upper left to the lower right) in the region of A and F stars (1–2 solar mass (M_{☉})) and extends to G and early K bright supergiants (early M if RV Tauri stars at minimum are included). Above the main sequence, the vast majority of stars in the instability strip are variable. Where the instability strip intersects the main sequence, the vast majority of stars are stable, but there are some variables, including the roAp stars and the Delta Scuti variables.

== Pulsations ==
Stars in the instability strip pulsate due to He III (doubly ionized helium), in a process based on the Kappa–mechanism. In normal A-F-G class stars, He in the stellar photosphere is neutral. Deeper below the photosphere, where the temperature reaches 25,000–30,000 K, begins the He II layer (first He ionization). Second ionization of helium (He III) starts at depths where the temperature is 35,000–50,000 K.

When the star contracts, the density and temperature of the He II layer increases. The increased energy is sufficient to remove the lone remaining electron in the He II, transforming it into He III (second ionization). This causes the opacity of the He layer to increase and the energy flux from the interior of the star is effectively absorbed. The temperature of the star's core increases, which causes it to expand. After expansion, the He III cools and begins to recombine with free electrons to form He II and the opacity of the star decreases. This allows the trapped heat to propagate to the surface of the star. When sufficient energy has been radiated away, overlying stellar material once again causes the He II layer to contract, and the cycle starts from the beginning. This results in the observed increase and decrease in the surface temperature of the star. In some stars, the pulsations are caused by the opacity peak of metal ions at about 200,000 K.

The phase shift between a star's radial pulsations and brightness variations depends on the distance of He II zone from the stellar surface in the stellar atmosphere. For most Cepheids, this creates a distinctly asymmetrical observed light curve, increasing rapidly to maximum and slowly decreasing back down to minimum.

== Other pulsating stars ==
There are several types of pulsating star not found on the instability strip and with pulsations driven by different mechanisms. At cooler temperatures are the long period variable AGB stars. At hotter temperatures are the Beta Cephei and PV Telescopii variables. Right at the edge of the instability strip near the main sequence are Gamma Doradus variables. The band of White dwarfs has three separate regions and types of variable: DOV, DBV, and DAV (= ZZ Ceti variables) white dwarfs. Each of these types of pulsating variable has an associated instability strip created by variable opacity partial ionisation regions other than helium.

Most high luminosity supergiants are somewhat variable, including the Alpha Cygni variables. In the specific region of more luminous stars above the instability strip are found the yellow hypergiants which have irregular pulsations and eruptions. The hotter luminous blue variables may be related and show similar short- and long-term spectral and brightness variations with irregular eruptions.
