= Horizontal branch =

Stage of stellar evolution

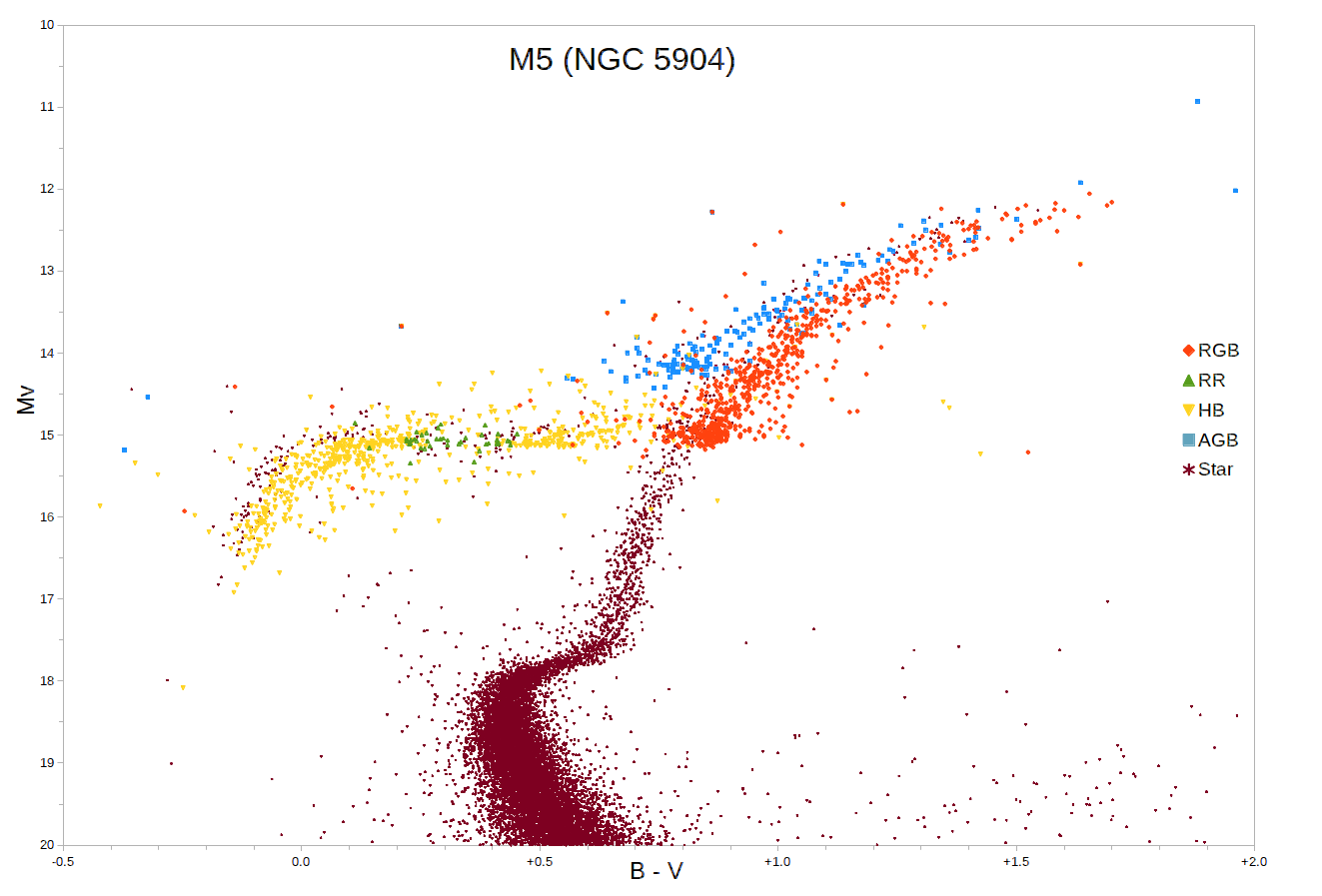
Hertzsprung–Russell diagram for globular cluster M5, with the horizontal branch marked in yellow, RR Lyrae stars in green, and some of the more luminous red-giant branch stars in red Asymptotic giant branch (AGB) Upper red-giant branch (RGB) Horizontal branch (HB) RR Lyrae variable (RR) End of main sequence, subgiant branch, and lower RGB

The horizontal branch (HB) is a stage of stellar evolution that immediately follows the red-giant branch in stars whose masses are similar to the Sun's. Horizontal-branch stars are powered by helium fusion in the core (via the triple-alpha process) and by hydrogen fusion (via the CNO cycle) in a shell surrounding the core. The onset of core helium fusion at the tip of the red-giant branch causes substantial changes in stellar structure, resulting in an overall reduction in luminosity, some contraction of the stellar envelope, and the surface reaching higher temperatures.

== Discovery ==
Horizontal branch stars were discovered with the first deep photographic photometric studies of globular clusters and were notable for being absent from all open clusters that had been studied up to that time. The horizontal branch is so named because in low-metallicity star collections like globular clusters, HB stars lie along a roughly horizontal line in a Hertzsprung–Russell diagram. Because the stars of one globular cluster are all at essentially the same distance from us, their apparent magnitudes all have the same relationship to their absolute magnitudes, and thus absolute-magnitude-related properties are plainly visible on an H-R diagram confined to stars of that cluster, undiffused by distance and thence magnitude uncertainties.

== Evolution ==
The evolutionary track of a sun-like star, showing the horizontal branch and red clump region

After exhausting their core hydrogen, stars leave the main sequence and begin fusion in a hydrogen shell around the helium core and become giants on the red-giant branch. In stars with masses up to 2.3 times the mass of the Sun the helium core becomes a region of degenerate matter that does not contribute to the generation of energy. It continues to grow and increase in temperature as the hydrogen fusion in the shell contributes more helium.

If the star has more than about 0.5 solar masses, the core eventually reaches the temperature necessary for the fusion of helium into carbon through the triple-alpha process. The initiation of helium fusion begins across the core region, which will cause an immediate temperature rise and a rapid increase in the rate of fusion. Within a few seconds the core becomes non-degenerate and quickly expands, producing an event called helium flash. Non-degenerate cores initiate fusion more smoothly, without a flash. The output of this event is absorbed by the layers of plasma above, so the effects are not seen from the exterior of the star. The star now changes to a new equilibrium state, and its evolutionary path switches from the red-giant branch (RGB) onto the horizontal branch of the Hertzsprung–Russell diagram.

Stars initially between about 2.3 M_{☉} and 8 M_{☉} have larger helium cores that do not become degenerate. Instead their cores reach the Schönberg–Chandrasekhar mass at which they are no longer in hydrostatic or thermal equilibrium. They then contract and heat up, which triggers helium fusion before the core becomes degenerate. These stars also become hotter during core helium fusion, but they have different core masses and hence different luminosities from HB stars. They vary in temperature during core helium fusion and perform a blue loop before moving to the asymptotic giant branch. Stars more massive than about 8 M_{☉} also ignite their core helium smoothly, and also go on to burn heavier elements as a red supergiant.

Stars remain on the horizontal branch for around 100 million years, becoming slowly more luminous in the same way that main sequence stars increase luminosity as the virial theorem shows. When their core helium is eventually exhausted, they progress to helium shell burning on the asymptotic giant branch (AGB). On the AGB they become cooler and much more luminous.

== Horizontal branch morphology ==
Stars on the horizontal branch all have very similar core masses, following the helium flash. This means that they have very similar luminosities, and on a Hertzsprung–Russell diagram plotted by visual magnitude the branch is horizontal.

The size and temperature of an HB star depends on the mass of the hydrogen envelope remaining around the helium core. Stars with larger hydrogen envelopes are cooler. This creates the spread of stars along the horizontal branch at constant luminosity. The temperature variation effect is much stronger at lower metallicity, so old clusters usually have more pronounced horizontal branches.

Although the horizontal branch is named because it consists largely of stars with approximately the same absolute magnitude across a range of temperatures, lying in a horizontal bar on a color–magnitude diagrams, the branch is far from horizontal at the blue end. The horizontal branch ends in a "blue tail" with hotter stars having lower luminosity, occasionally with a "blue hook" of extremely hot stars. It is also not horizontal when plotted by bolometric luminosity, with hotter horizontal branch stars being less luminous than cooler ones.

The hottest horizontal-branch stars, referred to as extreme horizontal branch, have temperatures of 20,000–30,000 K. This is far beyond what would be expected for a normal core helium burning star. Theories to explain these stars include binary interactions, and "late thermal pulses", where a thermal pulse that asymptotic giant branch (AGB) stars experience regularly, occurs after fusion has ceased and the star has entered the superwind phase. These stars are "born again" with unusual properties. Despite the bizarre-sounding process, this is expected to occur for 10% or more of post-AGB stars, although it is thought that only particularly late thermal pulses create extreme horizontal-branch stars, after the planetary nebular phase and when the central star is already cooling towards a white dwarf.

== The RR Lyrae gap ==
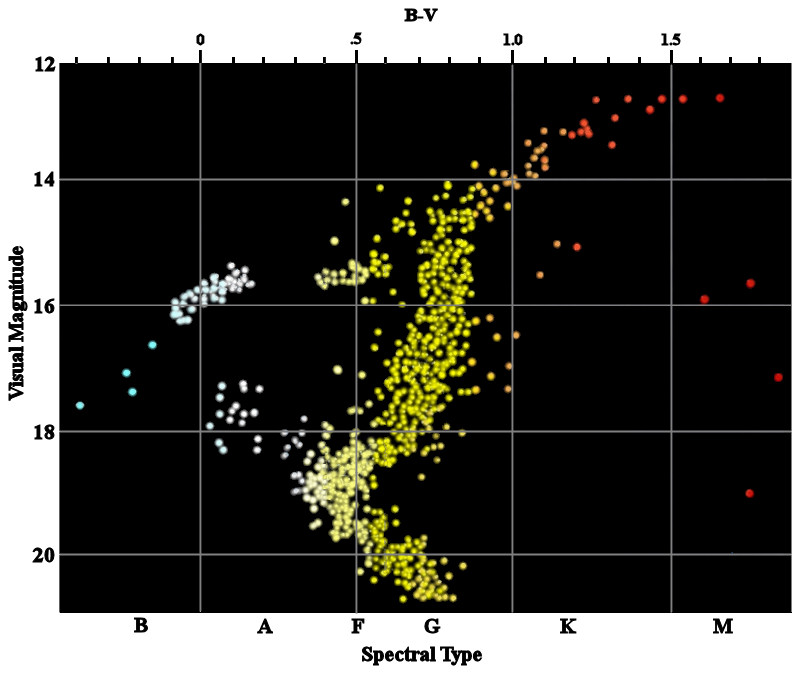
Hertzsprung–Russell diagram for the globular cluster M3

Globular cluster CMDs (Color-Magnitude diagrams) generally show horizontal branches that have a prominent gap in the HB. This gap in the CMD incorrectly suggests that the cluster has no stars in this region of its CMD. The gap occurs at the instability strip, where many pulsating stars are found. These pulsating horizontal-branch stars are known as RR Lyrae variable stars and they are obviously variable in brightness with periods of up to 1.2 days.

It requires an extended observing program to establish the star's true (that is, averaged over a full period) apparent magnitude and color. Such a program is usually beyond the scope of an investigation of a cluster's color–magnitude diagram. Because of this, while the variable stars are noted in tables of a cluster's stellar content from such an investigation, these variable stars are not included in the graphic presentation of the cluster CMD because data adequate to plot them correctly are unavailable. This omission often results in the RR Lyrae gap seen in many published globular cluster CMDs.

Different globular clusters often display different HB morphologies, by which is meant that the relative proportions of HB stars existing on the hotter end of the RR Lyr gap, within the gap, and to the cooler end of the gap varies sharply from cluster to cluster. The underlying cause of different HB morphologies is a long-standing problem in stellar astrophysics. Chemical composition is one factor (usually in the sense that more metal-poor clusters have bluer HBs), but other stellar properties like age, rotation and helium content have also been suggested as affecting HB morphology. This has sometimes been called the "Second Parameter Problem" for globular clusters, because there exist pairs of globular clusters which seem to have the same metallicity yet have very different HB morphologies; one such pair is NGC 288 (which has a very blue HB) and NGC 362 (which has a rather red HB). The label "second parameter" acknowledges that some unknown physical effect is responsible for HB morphology differences in clusters that seem otherwise identical.

== Relationship to the red clump ==
A related class of stars is the clump giants, those belonging to the so-called red clump, which are the relatively younger (and hence more massive) and usually more metal-rich population I counterparts to HB stars (which belong to population II). Both HB stars and clump giants are fusing helium to carbon in their cores, but differences in the structure of their outer layers result in the different types of stars having different radii, effective temperatures, and color. Since color index is the horizontal coordinate in a Hertzsprung–Russell diagram, the different types of star appear in different parts of the CMD despite their common energy source. In effect, the red clump represents one extreme of horizontal-branch morphology: all the stars are at the red end of the horizontal branch, and may be difficult to distinguish from stars ascending the red-giant branch for the first time.
