= SX Centauri =

Supergiant variable star in the constellation Centaurus

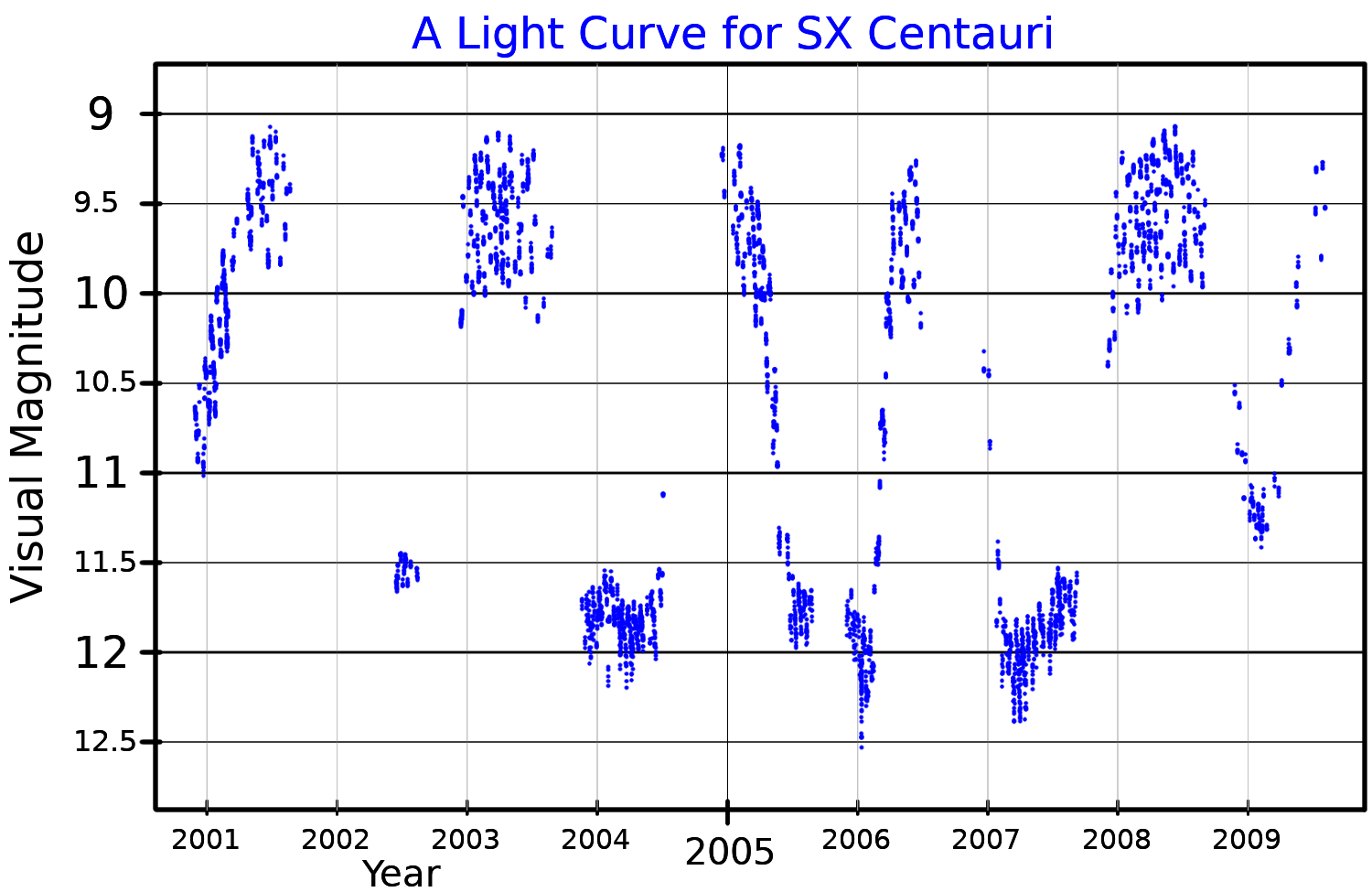
- A visual band light curve for SX Centauri, plotted from ASAS data

Observation data Epoch J2000 Equinox ICRS
- Constellation: Centaurus
- Right ascension: 12^{h} 21^{m} 12.5741^{s}
- Declination: −49° 12′ 41.060″
- Apparent magnitude (V): 9.1 to 12.4

Characteristics
- Evolutionary stage: post-AGB
- Spectral type: F5G3/5Vp
- Variable type: RV Tauri (RVB, RVb)

Astrometry
Radial velocity (R_{v})	19.1 ± 0.4 km/s km/s
Proper motion (μ)	RA: −14.357 mas/yr Dec.: 2.836 mas/yr
Parallax (π)	0.2175±0.0411 mas
Distance	approx. 15,000 ly (approx. 4,600 pc)
Absolute magnitude (M_{V})	−4.343

Orbit
Period (P)	592±13 days
Eccentricity (e)	0.16±0.02
Periastron epoch (T)	2,452,107 ± 10 JD
Semi-amplitude (K_{1}) (primary)	22.9±0.5 km/s

Details

Primary
Mass	0.6 M_{☉}
Radius	61.1+14.7 −9.8 R_{☉}
Luminosity	3,684+2,315 −842 L_{☉}
Surface gravity (log g)	1.5 cgs
Temperature	6,000 K
Metallicity [Fe/H]	-1.0 dex

Other designations
- SX Centauri, CD-48 7357, HD 107439, SAO 223370

Database references
SIMBAD	data

SX Centauri is a variable star in the constellation Centaurus. A RV Tauri variable, its light curve alternates between deep and shallow minima, varying its apparent magnitude from 9.1 to 12.4. From the period-luminosity relationship, it is estimated to be around 1.6 kpc (5200 light-years) from Earth. Gaia Data Release 2 gives a parallax of 0.2175 mas, corresponding to distance of about 4,600 pc. Henrietta Leavitt announced the discovery of this variable star, in 1906, when it was called CPD-48° 4730. It was given its variable star designation, SX Centauri, in 1907.

RV Tauri variables like SX Centauri are supergiant pulsating stars and a subtype of the population II Cepheids. They are stars that have already passed the asymptotic giant branch (AGB) and are in the last stage of their evolution before becoming a planetary nebula. This transition phase is very fast, and may last for less than a thousand years. SX Centauri is in the beginning of this process and is estimated to be leaving the AGB right now, or to have left the AGB a few decades ago. Its pulsations are radial in nature and have a period of about 32.9 days (from deep minimum to deep minimum), causing the effective temperature of the star to vary between 5,000 and 6,500 K and the radius between 21 and 29 solar radii. The radius seems to have the same value in both the primary and secondary minima, while the temperature shows a 500 K variation between minima.

The spectrum of SX Centauri shows infrared excess, indicating the presence of a circumstellar disk of hot dust around the star. interferometric observations constrained the diameter of the disk to less than 11 arcseconds (18 AU at the star's distance), indicating a very compact system. The infrared emission is consistent with a hotter component (715 K) corresponding to 4% of the dust, and a colder one (244 K) corresponding to 96% of the dust. This material is composed mainly of amorphous carbon and graphite (83%), with the remainder being pyroxene and olivine. The disk is related to a depletion of refractory elements (with high condensation temperature) in the star's photosphere; this is caused by separation of gas from dust rich in refractories, followed by accretion of the gas by the star.

SX Centauri is a spectroscopic binary, having a companion star with an orbital period of 592 days and an orbital eccentricity of 0.16. This companion has a mass estimated between 1.4 and 1.9 solar masses and is probably an unevolved main sequence star. The system must have interacted in the past when the primary was a red giant, which is likely related to the formation of disk. All RV Tauri stars with dust disks are believed to be part of a binary system.

Slow periodic variations in the mean brightness of SX Centauri have been detected, leading the star to be classified as an RV Tauri star of the photometric class b (RVb). The period of this variation is approximately equal to the orbital period of the system. This phenomenon can be explained as variation of the circumstellar extinction during the orbital motion of the disk.
