= R Sagittae =

Star in the constellation Sagitta

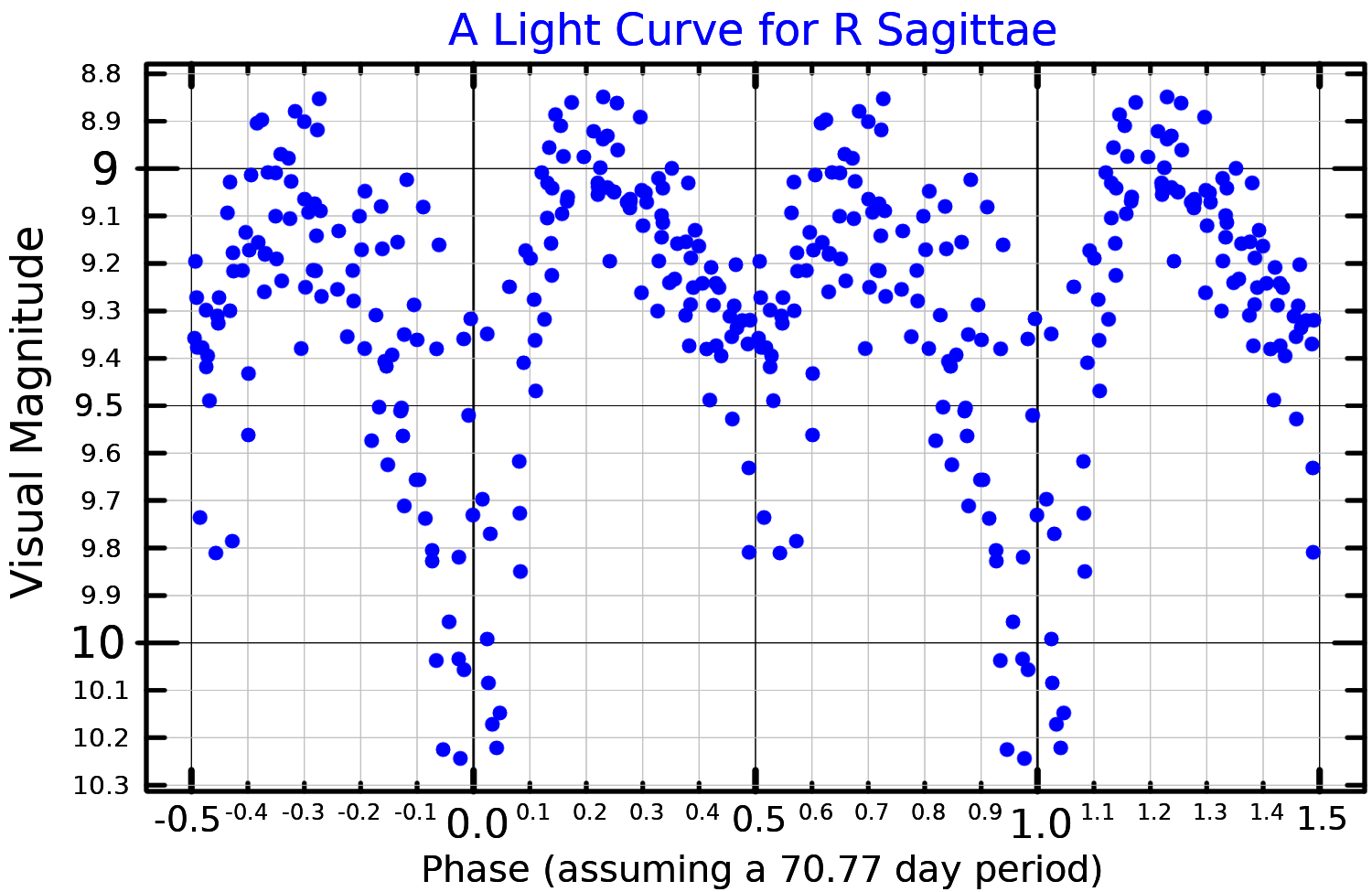
- A visual band light curve for R Sagittae, plotted from ASAS data

Observation data Epoch J2000.0 Equinox J2000.0 (ICRS)
- Constellation: Sagitta
- Right ascension: 20^{h} 14^{m} 03.7451^{s}
- Declination: +16° 43′ 35.053″
- Apparent magnitude (V): 8.9 – 9.8

Characteristics
- Evolutionary stage: Post-AGB
- Spectral type: G0Ib-G8Ib
- U−B color index: +0.1 – +0.9
- B−V color index: +0.75 – +1.3
- Variable type: RVb

Astrometry
| Radial velocity (R_{v}) | +8.3 km/s |
| Proper motion (μ) | RA: −2.180 mas/yr Dec.: −4.818 mas/yr |
| Parallax (π) | 0.4030±0.0457 mas |
| Distance | approx. 8,100 ly (approx. 2,500 pc) |
| Absolute magnitude (M_{V}) | −3.5 |

Details
| Mass | 0.81 M_{☉} |
| Radius | 61.2+12.5 −9.9 R_{☉} |
| Luminosity | 2,329+744 −638 L_{☉} |
| Surface gravity (log g) | −0.5 – 0.0 cgs |
| Temperature | 5,100 (4,250-5,750) K |
| Metallicity [Fe/H] | −0.50 dex |

Other designations
- HD 192388, BD+16 4197, SAO 105871, AAVSO 2009+16

Database references
| SIMBAD | data |

R Sagittae is an RV Tauri variable star in the constellation Sagitta that varies from magnitude 8.0 to 10.5 in 70.77 days. It is a post-AGB low mass yellow supergiant that varies between spectral types G0Ib and G8Ib as it pulsates. Its variable star designation of "R" indicates that it was the first star discovered to be variable in the constellation. It was discovered in 1859 by Joseph Baxendell, though classified as a semi regular variable until RV Tauri variables were identified as a distinct class in 1905.

R Sagittae is classified as an RV Tauri variable because of the distinctive regular variations with alternating deep and shallow minima. The period is conventionally quoted as the time between two deep minima and is the fundamental pulsation mode. The shallow minimum is the result of a first overtone pulsation. It is further classified as RVb since the average and maximum magnitude varies slowly over several years. The main period also varies over a period of decades. It has around 90% the mass of the Sun and an average effective (surface) temperature of around 5,000 K. It is around 10,000 times as luminous as the Sun. Measurement of its parallax by the Gaia satellite yields a distance of around 8,100 light-years.

Variable star observer David Levy recommends that amateur observers monitor it once a week to observe changes in brightness.

RV Tauri variables are post-AGB stars, originally similar to the Sun but now in the last stages of their lives. They are crossing the Cepheid instability strip as they lose their outer layers on the way to becoming a planetary nebula. Although their spectra and luminosities resemble supergiants, they are old low mass population II stars. A period-colour-luminosity relationship has been derived from observations of RV Tauri variables in the Large Magellanic Cloud that is closely related to the relationship for type II Cepheid variables.
