= HP Lyrae =

Variable star in the constellation Lyra

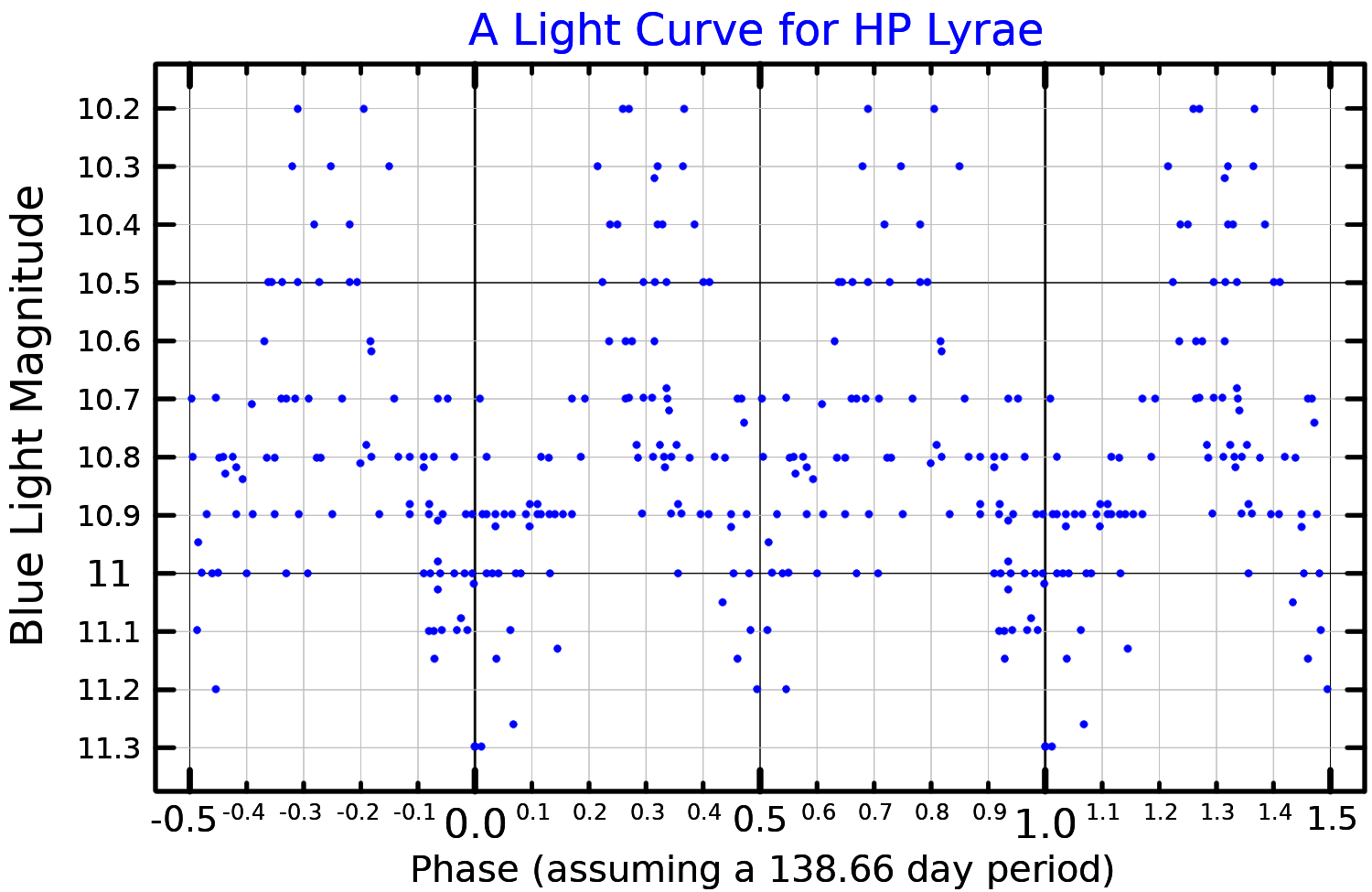
- A blue band light curve for HP Lyrae, adapted from Wenzel (2013)

Observation data Epoch J2000 Equinox ICRS
- Constellation: Lyra
- Right ascension: 19^{h} 21^{m} 39.066^{s}
- Declination: +39° 56′ 08.05″
- Apparent magnitude (V): 10.2 - 10.8

Characteristics
- Spectral type: A2-F2 Iab
- U−B color index: +0.1 - +0.5
- B−V color index: +0.3 - +0.7
- Variable type: RV Tau

Astrometry
Radial velocity (R_{v})	−107 km/s
Proper motion (μ)	RA: −2.485±0.038 mas/yr Dec.: −5.500±0.047 mas/yr
Parallax (π)	0.0822±0.0242 mas
Distance	6,700±380 pc
Absolute magnitude (M_{V})	−4.5

Orbit
Period (P)	1,631 days
Eccentricity (e)	0.17
Argument of periastron (ω) (secondary)	5.5°
Semi-amplitude (K_{1}) (primary)	7.7 km/s

Details
Mass	0.6 M_{☉}
Radius	60 R_{☉}
Luminosity	3,900±400 L_{☉}
Surface gravity (log g)	1.0 cgs
Temperature	5,900 K
Metallicity [Fe/H]	−1.0 dex

B
Mass	0.5 - 0.6 M_{☉}

Other designations
- HP Lyrae, TYC 3138-54-1, ASAS J192139+3956.1, IRAS 19199+3950, 2MASS J19213906+3956080, AAVSO 1918+39

Database references
SIMBAD	data

HP Lyrae (HP Lyr) is a variable star in the constellation Lyra, with a visual magnitude varying between 10.2 and 10.8. It will likely be an RV Tauri variable, an unstable post-AGB star losing mass before becoming a white dwarf.

== Discovery ==
HP Lyr was first reported to be variable in 1935 by Otto Morgenroth of the Sonneberg Observatory. The range was given as 9.5 - 10.5 and the variability type only as long-period. In 1961, it was formally designated as a β Lyr eclipsing variable with two A type supergiants in a close orbit producing smooth continuous variations with alternating minima of different depths. The period was given as 140.75 days, covering two maxima, and both a deep primary minimum and a slightly less deep secondary minimum.

In 2001 a request was made for observations of HP Lyr. Shortly after it was reported that HP Lyr was likely to be an RV Tauri variable rather than an eclipsing binary. This was confirmed with a more detailed study published in 2002. Some authors still maintain that the spectral type and nature of variation mean HP Lyr is more likely to be an eclipsing variable.

== Variability ==
HP Lyr varies by about 0.5 magnitude over a "halfperiod" of 68.4 days. The formal period, defined for an RV Tauri variable as being from deep minimum to deep minimum is twice that length. Its spectrum changes from A2-3 at maximum to F2 at the deepest minima. The radial velocity changes are typical for the pulsations of an RV Tauri variable, but are not compatible with a binary orbit. The spectral type and colour indicated that it was likely to be the hottest known RV Tauri star.

Until 1960, the period of HP Lyr was very consistent at 140.75 days. Since then it has been observed to reduce to below 140 days, probably quite suddenly. A survey of historic photography including the star showed that the period changed in 1962 or 1963, taking no more than four cycles to reach a new value of 138.66 days.

== Properties ==
A 2005 study of the elemental abundances of RV Tauri stars calculated that HP Lyr had a temperature around 6,300 K and typical abundances for an RV Tauri variable. It also revealed that the abundances were altered by dust-gas separation in circumstellar material. HP Lyr has been included in a catalog of confirmed post-AGB stars, highly evolved and on its way to becoming a white dwarf. In 2017, the temperature was calculated to be 5,900 K, still one of the hottest known RV Tau variables.

The distance is uncertain, although large. Gaia Data Release 2 contains a parallax indicating a distance of around 12,000 pc. Using luminosities derived from a period-luminosity-colour relationship, together with interstellar extinctions, gives a distance of around 6,700 K. From the radius and effective temperature, the radius is calculated to be 60 R_{☉}.

HP Lyrae is a post-AGB star, one that has completed its evolution along the asymptotic giant branch (AGB) and is now rapidly shedding its outer layers prior to becoming a white dwarf. During this process it becomes hotter and crosses the instability strip which causes it to become unstable and pulsate.

== Binary ==
Many RV Tauri stars are found to be in binary systems, and HP Lyrae has an invisible companion in a 1,631 d orbit. Its properties are not known, but the mass is estimated to be a little under 0.6 M_{☉}, leaving open the possibility that it is a white dwarf.
