= LHA 120-S 79 =

Luminous variable star

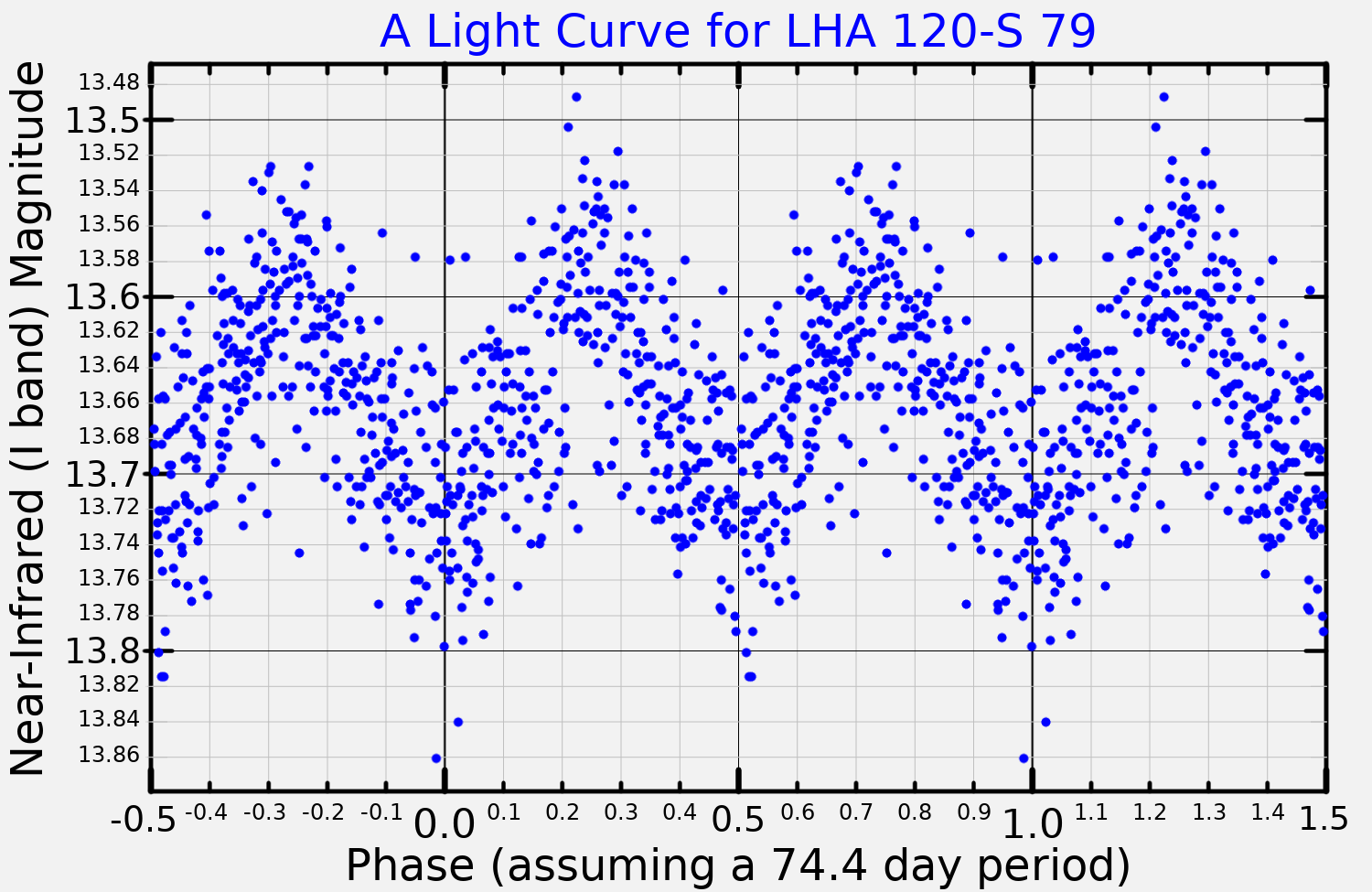
- A light curve for LHA 120-S 79, Adapted from Manick et al. (2018). The data were folded with the "formal period" which is twice the 37.2 fundamental period.

Observation data Epoch J2000 Equinox J2000
- Constellation: Dorado
- Right ascension: 05^{h} 04^{m} 44.84888^{s}
- Declination: −68° 58′ 31.5436″
- Apparent magnitude (V): 13.77

Characteristics
- Spectral type: B2IIIe
- U−B color index: -0.19
- B−V color index: 0.84
- Variable type: RV Tauri variable

Astrometry
| Proper motion (μ) | RA: 1.672 mas/yr Dec.: 0.061 mas/yr |
| Parallax (π) | −0.0139±0.0142 mas |
| Distance | 50,000 pc |
| Absolute magnitude (M_{V}) | −4.725 |

Details
| Radius | 35.09 (Note: Applying the Stefan–Boltzmann law with a nominal solar effective temperature of 5,772 K: $$\sqrt{(5772/10624)^4 * 14,073} = 35.09\ R\odot$$) R_{☉} |
| Luminosity | 14,073 L_{☉} |
| Temperature | 10,624 K |

Other designations
- OGLE LMC-T2CEP-199, 2MASS J05044482-6858317

Database references
| SIMBAD | data |

LHA 120-S 79 is an RV Tauri variable star located in the Large Magellanic Cloud, located about 163,000 light years away in the constellation of Dorado, with a period of 37.203 days. The star is extremely hot for a star of its type, as its temperature is over 10,000 K, and it is hot enough to be classified as a B-type blue giant, as well as being the hottest RV Tauri variable in the LMC. LHA 120-S 79 is also extremely luminous, at over 14,000 L☉, and it is the most luminous known star of its type in the galaxy.

However, the star may be less luminous than it seems, as its spectral energy distribution is contaminated by a very nearby star, 2MASS J05044388−6858371, which is also a long-period variable star and is just 8 arcseconds from LHA 120-S 79.
