= AC Herculis =

Spectroscopic binary star in the constellation Hercules

Observation data Epoch J2000.0 Equinox J2000.0 (ICRS)
- Constellation: Hercules
- Right ascension: 18^{h} 30^{m} 16.23850^{s}
- Declination: +21° 52′ 00.6080″
- Apparent magnitude (V): 6.85 - 9.00

Characteristics
- Evolutionary stage: Post-AGB star
- Spectral type: F2pIb-K4e(C0,0)
- U−B color index: +0.17 - +0.94
- B−V color index: +0.52 - +1.09
- Variable type: RVa

Astrometry
Radial velocity (R_{v})	−30.00 km/s
Proper motion (μ)	RA: -2.82 ± 1.12 mas/yr Dec.: -0.18 ± 1.16 mas/yr
Parallax (π)	0.7843±0.0289 mas
Distance	4,200 ± 200 ly (1,280 ± 50 pc)

Orbit
Period (P)	1,187.7 days
Semi-major axis (a)	2.83 au (2.01 mas)
Eccentricity (e)	0.206
Inclination (i)	142.9°
Longitude of the node (Ω)	155.1°
Periastron epoch (T)	MJD 59023.1
Argument of periastron (ω) (primary)	118.6°
Semi-amplitude (K_{1}) (primary)	10.5 km/s

Details

A
Mass	0.73 M_{☉}
Radius	47.1^{+4.7}_{−4.1} R_{☉}
Luminosity	2475^{+183}_{−209} L_{☉}
Surface gravity (log g)	0.65 cgs
Temperature	5900 K
Metallicity [Fe/H]	−1.5 dex

B
Mass	1.40 M_{☉}

Other designations
- AC Her, GSC 01581-01726, HD 170756, HIP 90697, BD+21°3459, 2MASS J18301623+2152007, IRAS 18281+2149, AAVSO 1826+21

Database references
SIMBAD	data

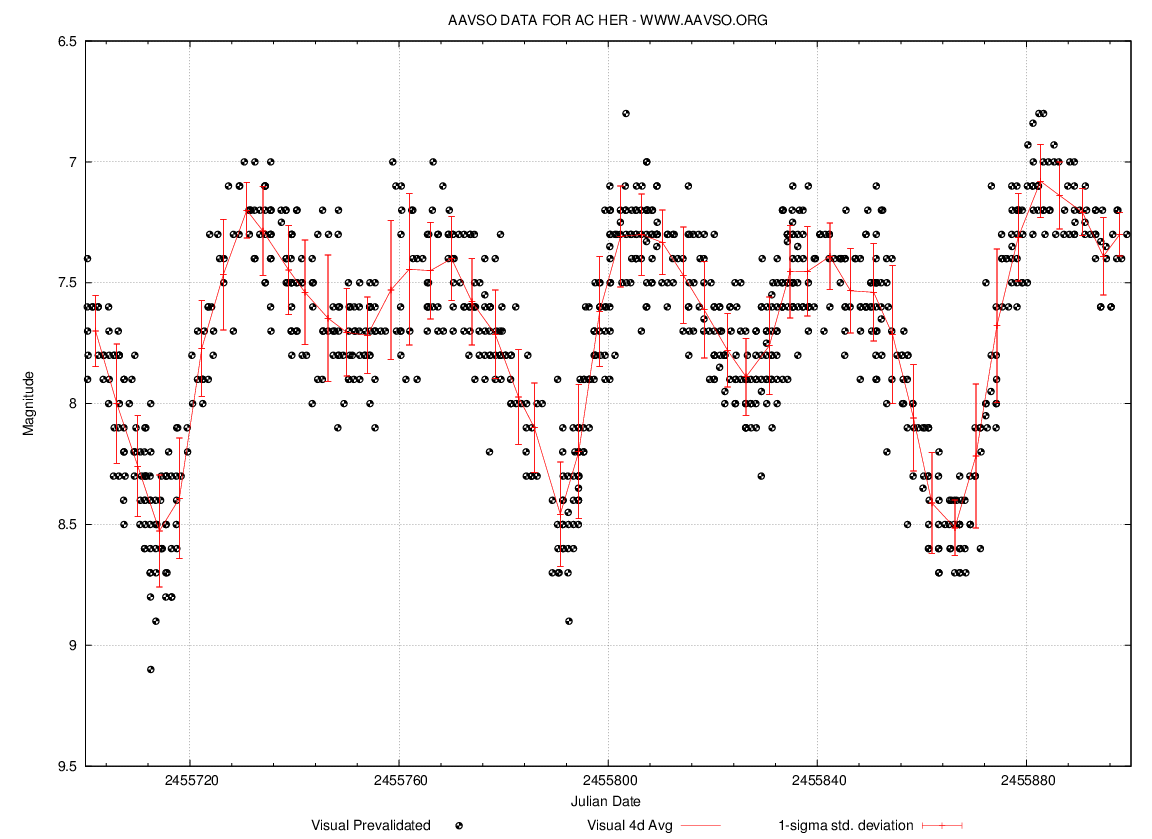
AAVSO light curve showing two complete cycles in 2011

AC Herculis, is an RV Tauri variable and spectroscopic binary star in the constellation of Hercules. It varies in brightness between apparent magnitudes 6.85 and 9.0.

AC Her is an RVa star, meaning it is an RV Tauri variable whose maximum and minimum magnitudes do not slowly vary over hundreds of days. It also is a very clear example of a common type of RV Tauri light curve where the maximum following a deep minimum is brighter than the maximum following a shallow minimum. In each period of 75.46 days it has two maxima and two minima.

AC Her is also a binary star, its companion was detected with spectroscopy and long baseline interferometry. Interferometric observations from the CHARA Array enabled its three dimensional orbit with a semimajor axis of 2.01 ± 0.01 mas, equivalent to 2.83 ± 0.08 au. The orbit has an inclination of 142.9 ± 1.1 degrees and a longitude of the ascending node of 155.1 ± 1.8 degrees. The invisible secondary is more massive (1.40 ± 0.12 M_{☉}) than the supergiant primary ( 0.73 ± 0.13 M_{☉}). The orbital period is 1187.7 days. The two stars are also surrounded by a dusty disc filling the region between 34 and 200 astronomical units (AU).

Little is known of the secondary star except that its mass is around 1.4 M_{☉}, deduced from the mass ratio of the binary system and the modelled mass of the primary star. The primary itself is calculated to have a mass of 0.73 M_{☉}, but a luminosity of 2,500 L_{☉}. It is slightly cooler than the sun, although this varies by over a thousand K as the star pulsates.

The total system mass can be estimated from the dynamics of the disc, and this gives a value of 1.5 M_{☉}, slightly lower than from other methods.
