= IRAS 08544−4431 =

Variable star in the constellation Vela

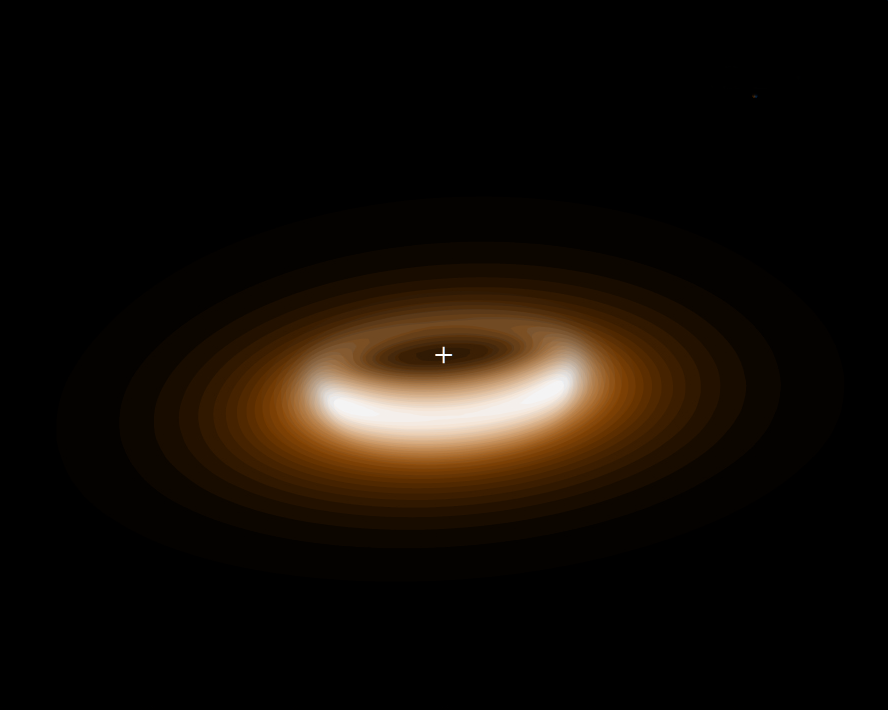
- Warm circumstellar material around IRAS 08544-4431; Credit: ESO

Observation data Epoch J2000.0 Equinox ICRS
- Constellation: Vela
- Right ascension: 08^{h} 56^{m} 14.181^{s}
- Declination: −44° 43′ 10.71″
- Apparent magnitude (V): 9.01 - 9.19

Characteristics
- Spectral type: F3e
- Variable type: RV

Astrometry
Radial velocity (R_{v})	+62.5 km/s
Proper motion (μ)	RA: −7.8 mas/yr Dec.: +9.5 mas/yr
Parallax (π)	0.6551±0.0767 mas
Distance	approx. 5,000 ly (approx. 1,500 pc)

Orbit
Period (P)	506.0±1.3 d
Eccentricity (e)	0.22±0.02
Inclination (i)	20±7.5°
Argument of periastron (ω) (secondary)	41.7±6.3°
Semi-amplitude (K_{1}) (primary)	87±0.2 km/s

Details

A
Mass	0.65 M_{☉}
Radius	75 R_{☉}
Luminosity	14,000 L_{☉}
Surface gravity (log g)	1.5 cgs
Temperature	7,250 K
Metallicity [Fe/H]	−0.5 dex

B
Mass	1.15 M_{☉}
Temperature	4,000 K

Other designations
- V390 Velorum, CD−44 4961, IRAS 08544−4431, 2MASS J08561419−4443107

Database references
SIMBAD	data

IRAS 08544−4431 is a binary system surrounded by a dusty ring in the constellation of Vela. The system contains an RV Tauri variable star and a more massive but much less luminous companion.

== Binary ==
The dusty ring around IRAS 08544−4431

In 2003, IRAS 08544−4431 was being studied as a likely RV Tauri variable and was identified as a binary star from periodic variations in its observed radial velocity. The primary is a luminous F3 star surrounded by a dusty disc, and the invisible secondary is a less massive star.

The two components of IRAS 08544−4431 orbit in 499 days in a mildly eccentric orbit. The projected semi-major axis is 0.32 AU but the inclination of the orbit is not known so the actual separation may be considerably larger, although the inclination is thought to be fairly large because the type of brightness variation implies a face-on system.

== Variability ==
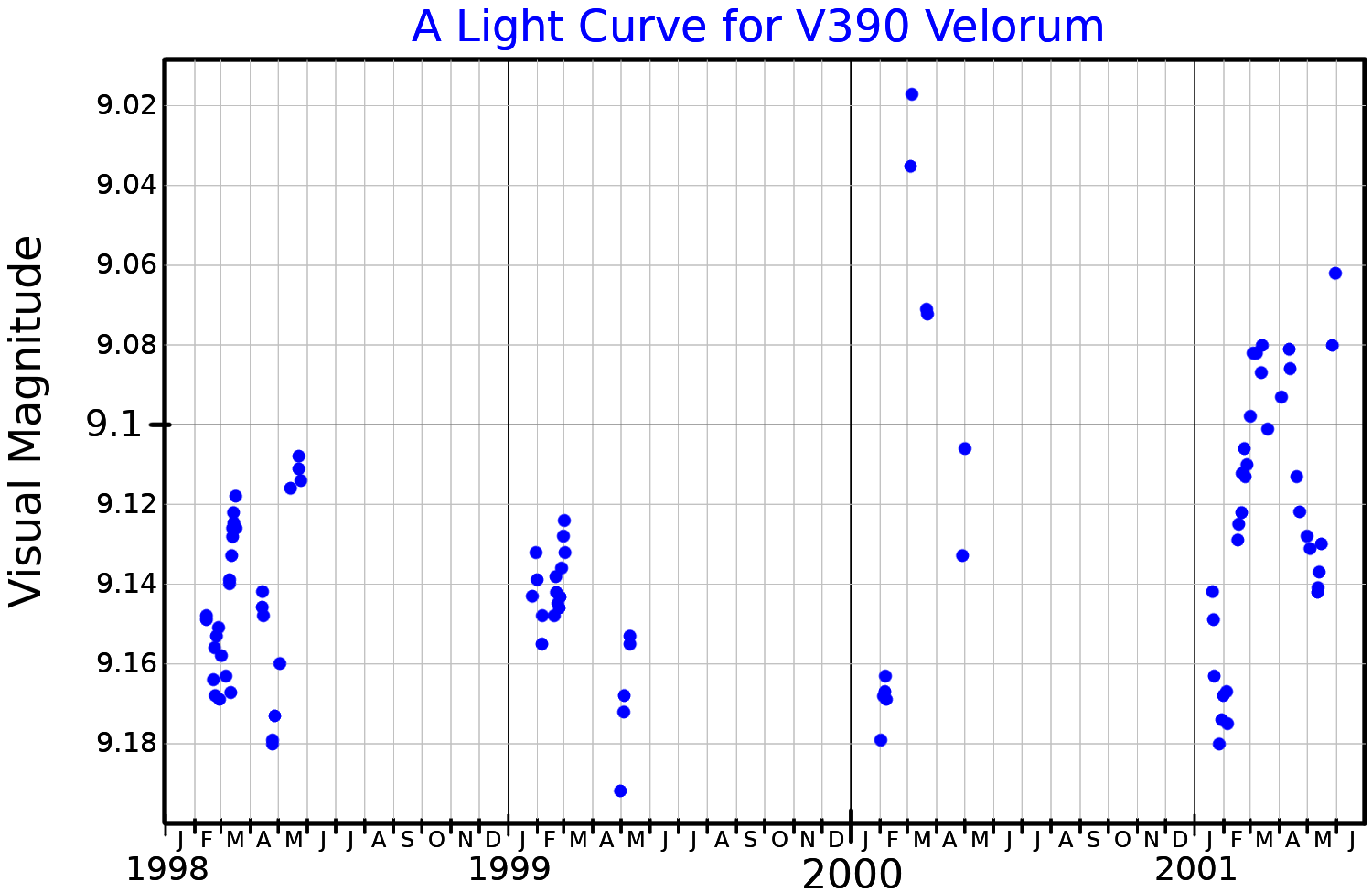
A visual band light curve for V390 Velorum, adapted from Mass et al. (2003)

IRAS 08544-4431 is classified as an RV Tauri star, a type of pulsating variable star which shows cycles with alternating shallow and deep minima. In addition, IRAS 08544-4431 shows slow variations in amplitude from cycle to cycle over approximately 1,600 days, a defining characteristic of a type b RV Tauri variable. The maximum amplitude is only 0.18 magnitudes. It was given the variable star designation of V390 Velorum in 2006.

The period, defined for an RV Tau star as the time between two deep minima, is 72 days. The slow variations in amplitude have been measured, represented by a period of 69 days producing beats. None of these variations correspond to the orbital motion.

== Post-AGB ==
The primary star is thought to be a post-AGB star, a highly evolved star that has ceased fusion and is ejecting its outer layers on its way to becoming a white dwarf. Although many post-AGB stars become planetary nebulae once they become hot enough to ionise their ejected outer layers, it is thought that IRAS 08544−4431 is not massive enough to do this.

== Dusty disc ==
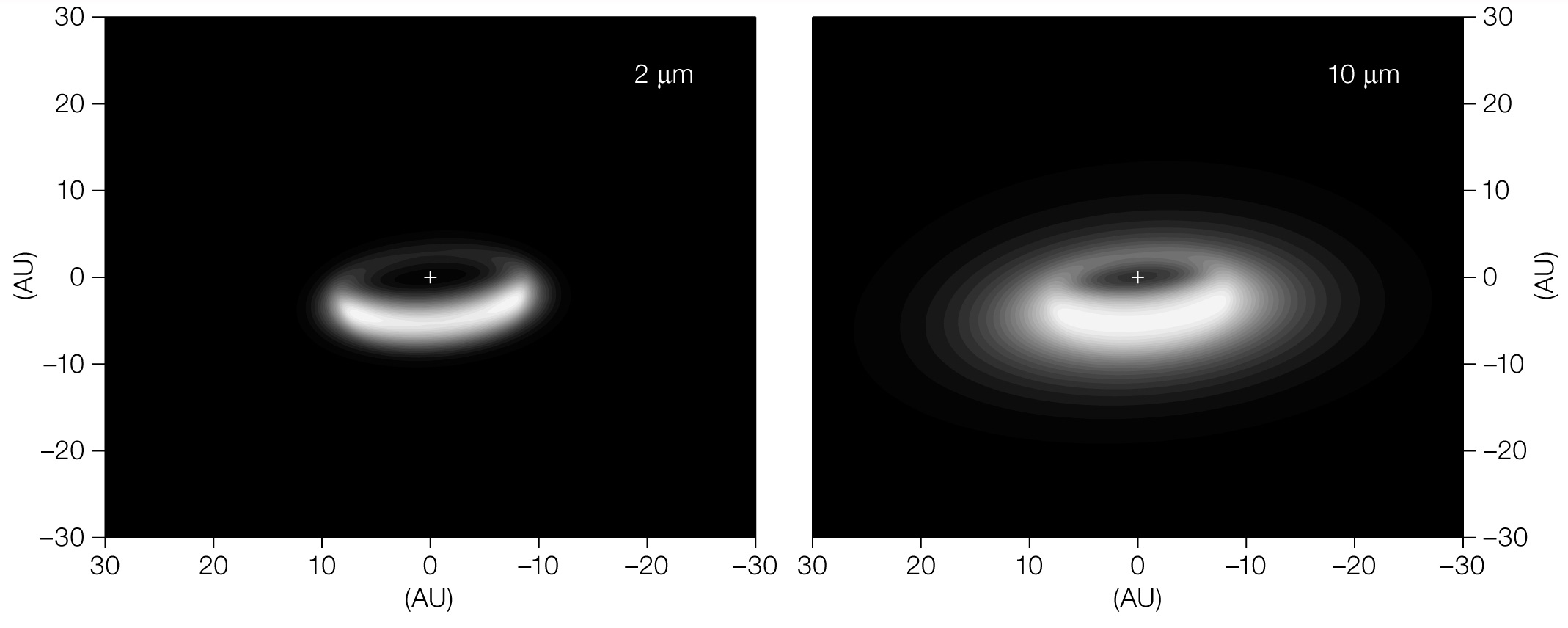
The disc around IRAS 08544−4431 at 2μm and 10μm. Although the image resembles a doughnut lit from the front, the brightest arc is the inner wall of the far side of the disc, lit by the stars at the centre.

The warm material surrounding IRAS 08544−4431 has been resolved using interferometry with the AMBER and MIDI instruments at the Very Large Telescope. It is a circumbinary disc surrounding both stars, is heated mainly by the primary post-AGB star, and has a total mass of 0.015 M_{☉}. The disc starts 9 AU from the stars and is approximately 4 AU thick at its inner edge. The thick disc protects much of the dust from direct heating out to 70 AU from the stars. Beyond 70 AU, the disc is thick enough to receive direct radiation from the stars.

The disc is at a temperature of 1,150 K. Although the companion is far less luminous than the primary, it is brighter than expected, especially at infrared wavelengths. It is suspected to be a main sequence star with its own compact accretion disc. The best images of the disc and stars, taken using the PIONIER interferometer, show the primary star to be 0.5 mas across, the secondary to be an unresolved point source 0.91 mas away, and the circumbinary disc to be 14.15 mas in diameter. The disc is oriented at 19° to the plane of the sky aligned at an angle of about 6° away from N-S.
