= EC 11507−2253 =

Star in the constellation Crater

Observation data Epoch J2000 Equinox J2000
- Constellation: Crater
- Right ascension: 11^{h} 53^{m} 15.905^{s}
- Declination: −23° 09′ 53.67″
- Apparent magnitude (V): 15.12

Characteristics
- Evolutionary stage: Post-AGB
- Spectral type: B5
- U−B color index: −0.63
- B−V color index: −0.09

Astrometry
Proper motion (μ)	RA: −1.298 mas/yr Dec.: −1.065 mas/yr
Parallax (π)	−0.0012±0.0375 mas
Distance	56,520 ly (17,329 pc)

Details
Mass	0.55 M_{☉}
Radius	4.0 R_{☉}
Luminosity	1,222 L_{☉}
Surface gravity (log g)	2.6 cgs
Temperature	15,500 K
Metallicity [Fe/H]	−1.40 dex
Rotational velocity (v sin i)	≤10 km/s

Other designations
- 2MASS J11531589−2309536

Database references
SIMBAD	data

EC 11507−2253 is a post-AGB star located about 81,000 light years, or 25 kpc, away from Earth in the constellation of Crater. Located in the distant galactic halo, over 50,000 light years above the galactic plane, EC 11507−2253 is very isolated and the rest of its life (likely only a few tens of thousands of years) will be spent in the halo as well, far from much of the stellar population. The apparent magnitude is only about 15, and it was only discovered in 1997 in a survey for blue objects at high latitudes (above the galactic plane).

== Properties ==
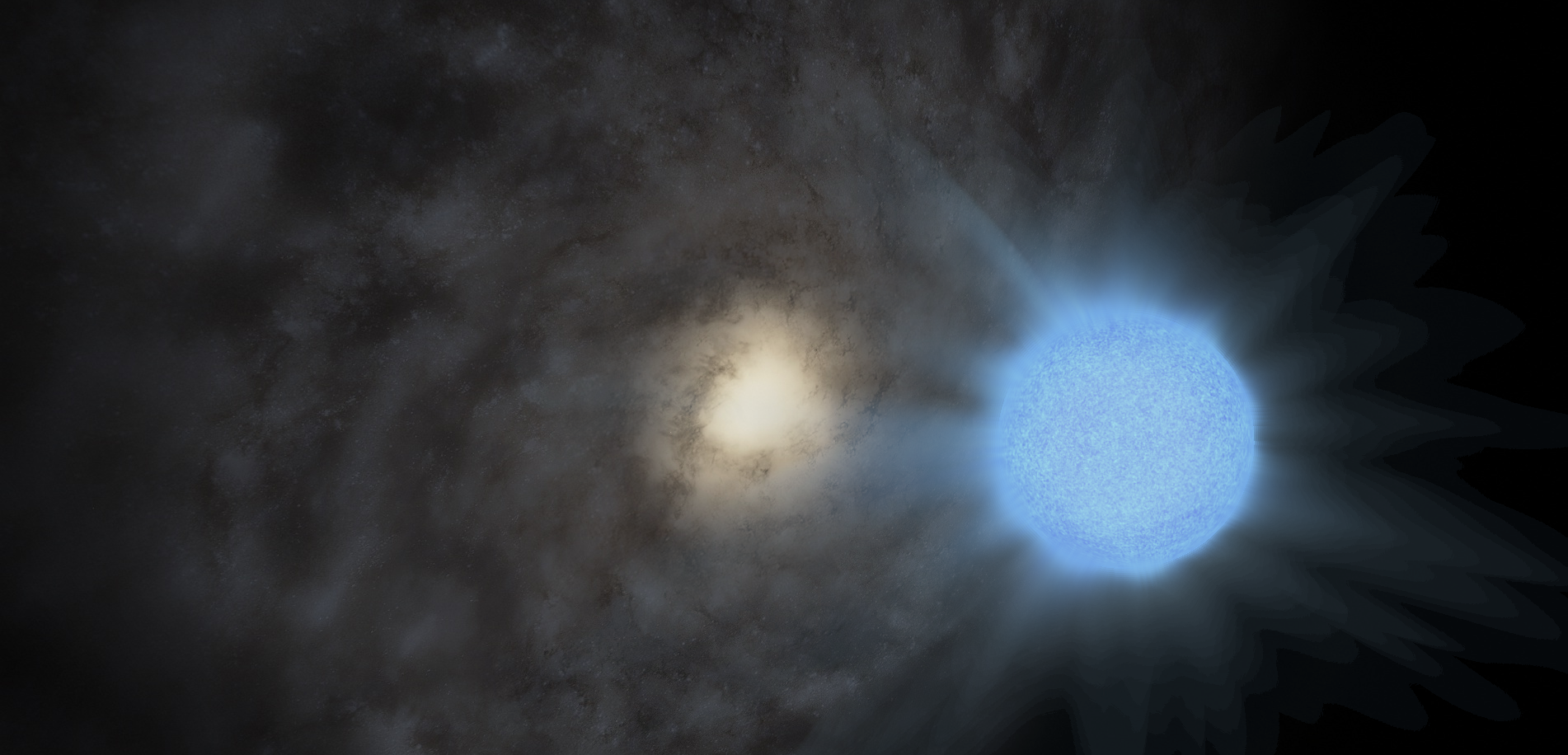
An artist's impression of EC 11507−2253. The Milky Way's bulge and disk are in the background

EC 11507−2253 is a hot post-AGB star. Initial analysis of its spectrum upon its discovery in 1997 yielded a spectral type of B5. Analysis of its spectrum in 2005 has revealed a temperature of about 15,500 K.

In 2015, a distance catalogue of post-AGB stars based on an assumed luminosity given the post-AGB star type and location was made, which included EC 11507−2253, which was assigned an estimated luminosity of 1,700 L_{☉} based on its status as an outer halo post-AGB star. This also yielded its distance value of 24.93 kpc. Modelling published with Gaia Data Release 3 gives a similar luminosity of 1,222 L_{☉} and a radius of 4 R_{☉}.
