= Z Apodis =

Variable star in the constellation Apus

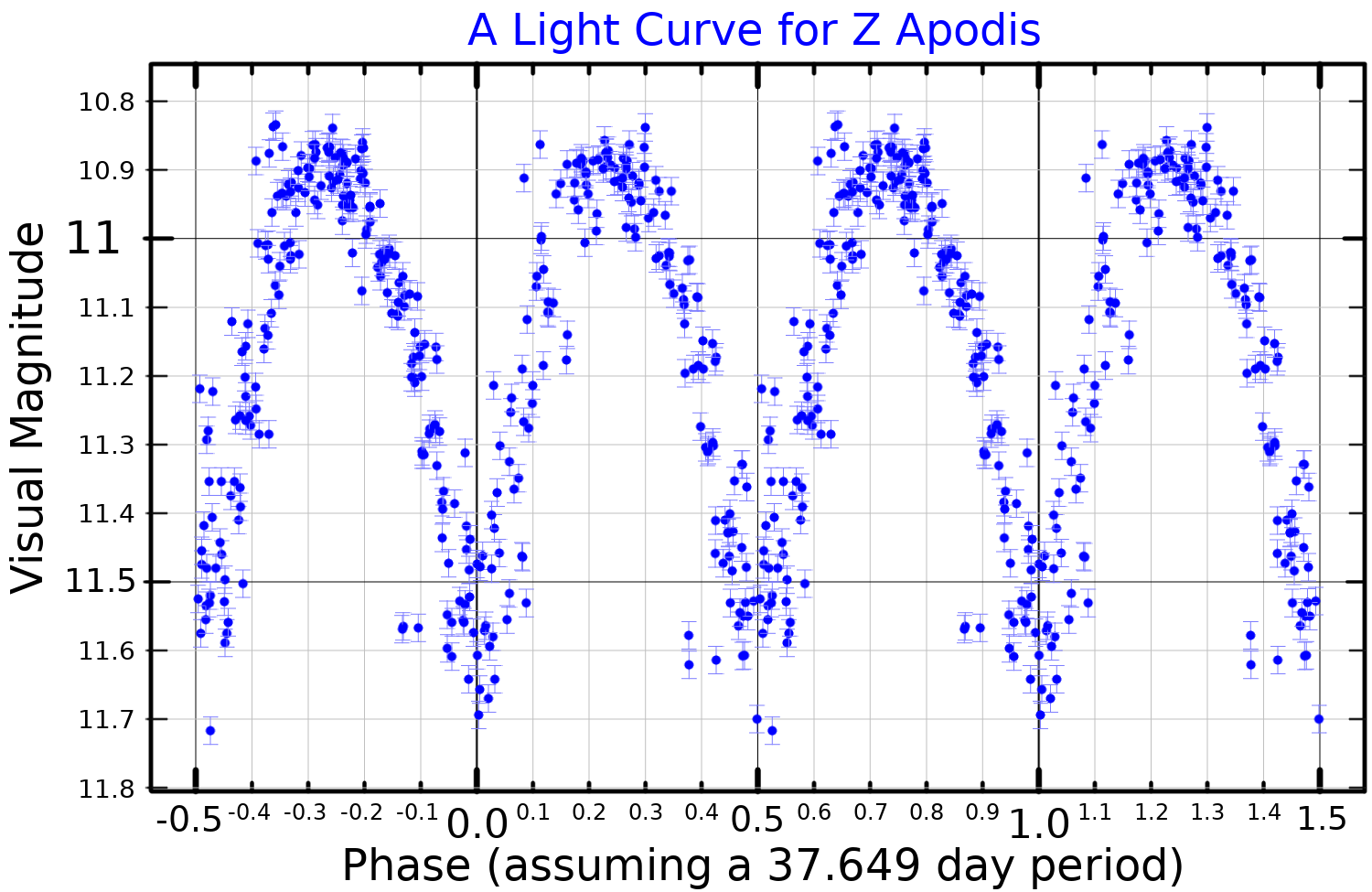
- A visual band light curve for Z Apodis, plotted from ASAS-SN data

Observation data Epoch J2000.0 Equinox J2000.0 (ICRS)
- Constellation: Apus
- Right ascension: 14^{h} 06^{m} 54.82^{s}
- Declination: −71° 22′ 16.7″
- Apparent magnitude (V): 10.8 to 12.0

Characteristics
- U−B color index: +0.5 - +1.5
- B−V color index: +1.5 - +1.75
- Variable type: RV Tau?

Astrometry
Proper motion (μ)	RA: −3.841 mas/yr Dec.: −1.604 mas/yr
Parallax (π)	0.3135±0.0131 mas
Distance	10,400 ± 400 ly (3,200 ± 100 pc)

Details
Mass	3.2 M_{☉}
Radius	27.6 R_{☉}
Luminosity	405 L_{☉}
Surface gravity (log g)	2.12 cgs
Temperature	4,579 K
Metallicity [Fe/H]	−0.76 dex
Age	11 Gyr

Other designations
- Z Aps, TYC 9252-1914-1, 2MASS J14065484-7122167, AAVSO 1358-70A

Database references
SIMBAD	data

Z Apodis (Z Aps) is a variable star in the constellation of Apus. It has an apparent visual magnitude which varies between 10.8 and 12.8, over a period of 39.37 days. Although described in the General Catalogue of Variable Stars as a cataclysmic variable star, it appears that it is a pulsating variable star, and has been classed as an RV Tauri variable star, type RVa. Other sources classify it is a type II (W Virginis) Cepheid.

Edna B. Florence discovered the variability of Z Apodis by examining photographic plates. The discovery was announced by Henrietta Hill Swope in 1931. Examination of 20 plates taken in 1925 allowed the derivation of a period of 19.5 days, almost exactly half of the currently accepted period. However, observations outside of that time window seemed "...too scattered to give any other indication of a period.", so the star was initially classified as an irregular variable.
