= U Monocerotis =

Variable star system in the constellation Monoceros

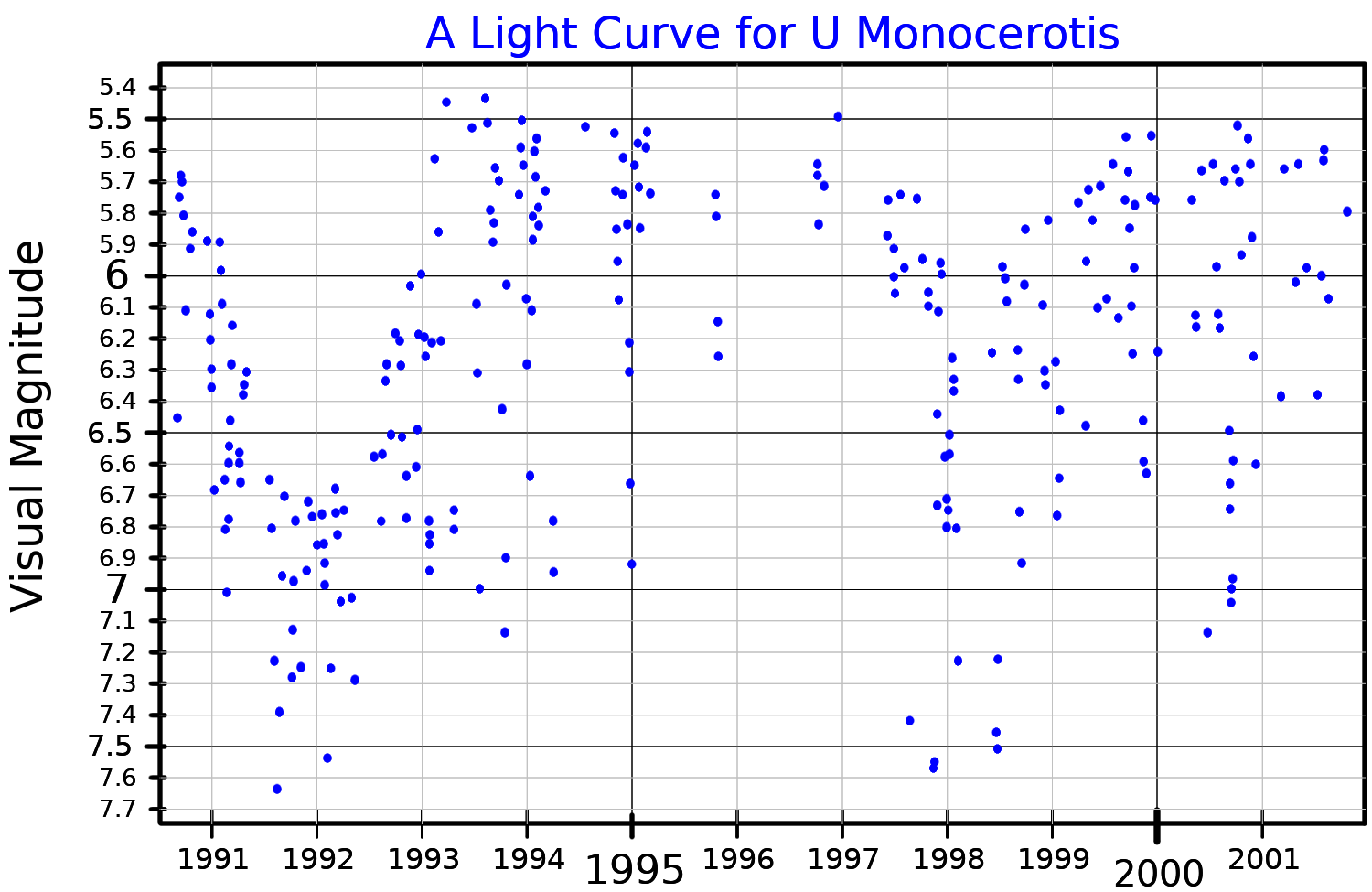
- A visual band light curve for U Monocerotis, adapted from Pollard et al. (2006)

Observation data Epoch J2000.0 Equinox J2000.0
- Constellation: Monoceros
- Right ascension: 07^{h} 30^{m} 47.473^{s}
- Declination: −09° 46′ 36.79″
- Apparent magnitude (V): 5.45 - 7.67

Characteristics
- Spectral type: F8eIb - K0pIb
- U−B color index: +0.47 - +1.22
- B−V color index: +0.81 - +1.27
- Variable type: RVb

Astrometry
Radial velocity (R_{v})	32 km/s
Proper motion (μ)	RA: −10.124 mas/yr Dec.: +3.268 mas/yr
Parallax (π)	0.9161±0.0915 mas
Distance	3,600 ± 400 ly (1,100 ± 100 pc)
Absolute magnitude (M_{V})	−4.516

Details
Mass	2.00+1.07 −0.72 M_{☉}
Radius	100.3+18.9 −13.2 R_{☉}
Luminosity	5,480+1,753 −882 L_{☉}
Surface gravity (log g)	0.0 cgs
Temperature	5,000 (4,930-5,830) K
Metallicity	−0.8

Other designations
- U Mon, HIP 36521, 2MASS J07304746−0946366, BD−09°2085, HD 59693, TYC 5400-4699-1, GCRV 5005, AAVSO 0726−09, IRAS 07284−0940

Database references
SIMBAD	data

U Monocerotis (U Mon) is a pulsating variable star and spectroscopic binary in the constellation Monoceros. The primary star is an RV Tauri variable, a cool luminous post-AGB star evolving into a white dwarf.

== History ==
U Mon was reported to be variable in 1918 by the renown German astronomer Ernst Hartwig. It was then included by Shapley in his list of Cepheid variables. In the 1950s a series of papers established the fundamental observational parameters of the star, its period, brightness range, colour changes, and spectral variation.

In 1970, U Mon was discovered to have a large infrared excess. The double-peaked spectral energy distribution and polarization are strongly indicative of a dust shell around the star.

== Visibility ==
U Mon can often be seen with the naked eye between Sirius and Procyon, but drops below naked eye visibility at deep minima. It lies about two degrees west of α Mon, at fourth magnitude the brightest star in Monoceros. At its brightest U Mon can reach magnitude 5.45. At a shallow minimum it drops to about magnitude 6.0, but at its deepest minima it is below magnitude 7.5. The period is given as 92.23 days, although this varies slightly from cycle to cycle. The brightness of the main pulsations varies over a long secondary period. This takes about 2,500 days, more than twice the length of the secondary period in any other RV Tauri variable.

== System ==
U Mon is a binary system with a dusty ring surrounding both stars. The companion cannot be observed directly or in the spectrum. Its existence is inferred by radial velocity changes as it orbits every 2,597 days. This is approximately the same time as the long secondary period that modulates the brightness variations. One model for these longterm variations is a periodic eclipse by a circumbinary dust disc.

== Properties ==
The exact properties of U Mon are uncertain. It has a measured parallax, but with considerable uncertainty. The properties can be inferred by other methods such as spectral line profiles and atmospheric modelling, but these methods are also uncertain for unusual stars like U Mon. RV Tauri stars have been shown to follow a period-luminosity relationship, and this can be used to confirm the luminosity and distance.

RV Tauri stars have low masses, although U Mon has been calculated to have one of the highest known masses for the class at about 2 M_{☉}. Despite the low masses, they are highly extended cool stars of high luminosity. U Mon has a luminosity of 5,480 L_{☉}, although this is both variable and highly uncertain. The spectral luminosity class is supergiant, indicating the rarefied nature of its atmosphere and low surface gravity. The surface gravity varies during the pulsations, dropping to extremely low values as the star passes through its largest size. The temperature varies by about 1,000 K, being hottest when the star is rising towards a maximum. Integrated radial velocities indicate that during the largest pulsations, the location of the reversing layer in the atmosphere moves by nearly 90% of the average stellar radius.

U Mon is a metal-poor star, as expected for a low-mass post-AGB object. It shows some enhancement of Carbon, but only to about 80% of the oxygen abundance. There is no suggestion of s-process elements being over-abundant. This is consistent with first dredge-up abundances, suggesting that most RV Tauri stars were not massive enough to experience a third dredge-up.

U Mon is surrounded by a dusty circumstellar disc, a common feature of RV Tauri variables. It is likely to be created by interaction with a binary companion.

== Evolution ==
U Mon is likely a post-Asymptotic Giant Branch (AGB) star, a low to intermediate mass star which is in the end stages of its life just prior to the expulsion of a planetary nebula and contraction to a white dwarf. RV Tauri variables give an insight into the lives and deaths of stars like the Sun. Evolution models show it takes about 10 billion years for a 1 solar mass (1 M_{☉}) star to reach the Asymptotic Giant Branch.
