= Type II Cepheid =

Type of variable stars

H-R diagram illustrating the location of Type II Cepheids in the instability strip

Type II Cepheids are variable stars which pulsate with periods typically between 1 and 50 days. They are population II stars: old, typically metal-poor, low mass objects.

Like all Cepheid variables, Type IIs exhibit a relationship between the star's luminosity and pulsation period, making them useful as standard candles for establishing distances where little other data is available.

Longer period Type II Cepheids, which are more luminous, have been detected beyond the Local Group in the galaxies NGC 5128 and NGC 4258.

== Classification ==
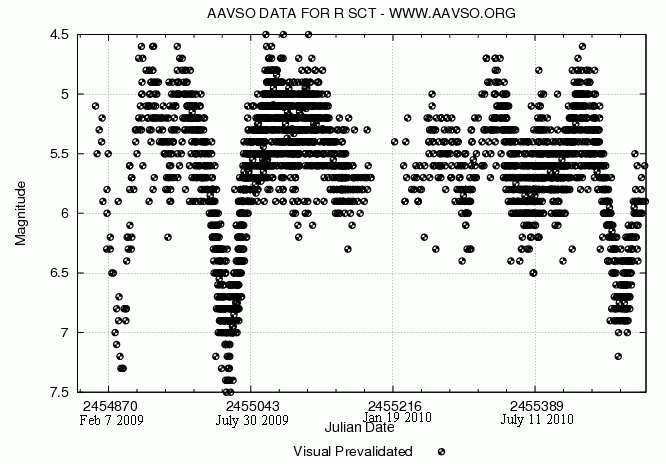
R Scuti Lightcurve (AAVSO)

Historically Type II Cepheids were called W Virginis variables but are now divided into three subclasses based on the length of their period. Stars with periods between 1 and 4 days are of the BL Herculis subclass and 10–20 days belong to the W Virginis subclass. Stars with periods greater than 20 days, and usually alternating deep and shallow minima, belong to the RV Tauri subclass. RV Tauri variables are usually classified by a formal period from deep minimum to deep minimum, hence 40 days or more.

The divisions between the types are not always clearcut or agreed. For example, the dividing line between BL Her and W Vir types is quoted at anything between 4 and 10 days, with no obvious division between the two. RV Tau variables may not have obvious alternating minima, while some W Vir stars do. Nevertheless, each type is thought to represent a distinct different evolutionary stage, with BL Her stars being helium core burning objects moving from the horizontal branch towards the asymptotic giant branch (AGB), W Vir stars undergoing hydrogen or helium shell burning on a blue loop, and RV Tau stars being post-AGB objects at or near the end of nuclear fusion.

RV Tau stars in particular show irregularities in their light curves, with slow variations in the brightness of both maxima and minima, variations in the period, intervals with little variation, and sometimes a temporary breakdown into chaotic behaviour. R Scuti has one of the most irregular light curves.

== Properties ==
The physical properties of all the type II Cepheid variables are poorly known. For example, it is expected that they have masses near or below that of the Sun, but there are few examples of reliable known masses.

== Period–luminosity relationship ==
Type II Cepheids are fainter than their classical Cepheid counterparts for a given period by about 1.6 magnitudes. Cepheid variables are used to establish the distance to the Galactic Center, globular clusters, and galaxies.

== Examples ==
Type II Cepheids are not as well-known as their type I counterparts, with only a couple of naked eye examples. In this list, the period quoted for RV Tauri variables is the interval between successive deep minima, hence twice the comparable period for the other sub-types.

Designation (name)	Constellation	Maximum Apparent magnitude (m_{v})	Minimum Apparent magnitude (m_{v})	Range of magnitude	Period	Spectral class	Subtype	Comment
RU Camelopardalis	Camelopardalis	8.1	9.79	1.61	22 d	C0,1-C3,2e(K0-R0)	W Vir	Carbon-rich
Kappa Pavonis	Pavo	3.91	4.78	0.87	9.09423 d	F5-G5I-II	W Vir	brightest member
R Scuti	Scutum	4.2	8.6	4.4	146.5 d	G0Iae-K2p(M3)Ibe	RV Tau	brightest member
RV Tauri	Taurus	9.5	13.5	4.0	78.5 d	G2eIa-M2Ia	RV Tau	prototype
RT Trianguli Australis	Triangulum Australe	9.43	10.18	0.35	1.9461124 d	F8:(R)-G2I-II	BL Her	carbon-rich
AL Virginis	Virgo	9.10	9.92	0.82	10.3065 d	F0-F8	W Vir	
W Virginis	Virgo	9.46	10.75	0.87	17.2736 d	F0Ib-G0Ib	W Vir	prototype
AF Crateris	Crater (constellation)	10.87	11.47	0.6	31.16 d	F5 I	RV Tau	extremely metal poor, [Fe/H] = -2.7
