= 14 Persei =

Star in the constellation Perseus

- Location of 14 Per (circled)

Observation data Epoch J2000 Equinox ICRS
- Constellation: Perseus
- Right ascension: 02^{h} 44^{m} 05.15918^{s}
- Declination: +44° 17′ 49.3488″
- Apparent magnitude (V): 5.43

Characteristics
- Spectral type: G0Ib
- B−V color index: +0.86

Astrometry
Radial velocity (R_{v})	−1.22±0.15 km/s
Proper motion (μ)	RA: 2.902 mas/yr Dec.: −6.682 mas/yr
Parallax (π)	1.7466±0.0989 mas
Distance	1,900 ± 100 ly (570 ± 30 pc)
Absolute magnitude (M_{V})	−1.57

Details
Mass	4.03 M_{☉}
Radius	57.4+3.7 −6.5 R_{☉}
Luminosity	372 L_{☉}
Surface gravity (log g)	1.42 cgs
Temperature	5,624 K
Metallicity [Fe/H]	0.00 dex
Rotational velocity (v sin i)	8.7 km/s
Age	162 Myr

Other designations
- 14 Per, BD+43°566, FK5 1077, HD 16901, HIP 12768, HR 800, SAO 38289

Database references
SIMBAD	data

14 Persei is a single star in the northern constellation Perseus, located roughly 1,900 light years away from the Sun. It is visible to the naked eye as a faint, yellow-hued star with an apparent visual magnitude is 5.43. The object is slowly moving closer to the Earth with a heliocentric radial velocity of −1.2 km/s.

The spectral classification of 14 Persei is as a G0 yellow supergiant, but in other respects it appears to be a giant star. The class has been given as G0Ib-II Ca1 CH-1 or G0Ib-IIa Ca1, where the abundance suffixes indicate stronger Calcium lines than expected for its class, or weaker hydrocarbons. Other analyses of the spectrum give a class of G0Ib. Stellar models of 14 Persei yield an estimated mass four times that of the Sun and an age of 162 million years. It has expanded to 57 times the Sun's radius and has a projected rotational velocity of 8.7 km/s. The star is radiating 372 times as much luminosity compared to the Sun from its enlarged photosphere at an effective temperature of 5,624 K.

14 Persei has been calculated to lie within the Cepheid instability strip although it is not considered to be variable. Uncertainty in the absolute magnitude means that the star may actually lie near the instability strip but not on it. Small periodic radial velocity variations are seen, but an order of magnitude or more smaller than for Cepheid variables and with longer periods than would be expected for pulsations. The cause of the radial velocity changes and the difference between variable and non-variable stars within the instability strip is unknown.
