= R Scuti =

Variable star in the constellation Scutum

- Location of R Scuti (circled)

Observation data Epoch J2000 Equinox ICRS
- Constellation: Scutum
- Right ascension: 18^{h} 47^{m} 28.95^{s}
- Declination: −05° 42′ 18.5″
- Apparent magnitude (V): 4.2–8.6

Characteristics
- Evolutionary stage: Asymptotic giant branch
- Spectral type: G0Iae-K2p(M3)Ibe
- U−B color index: 1.53
- B−V color index: 1.47
- Variable type: RV Tau

Astrometry
Radial velocity (R_{v})	43.80 km/s
Proper motion (μ)	RA: −45.399 mas/yr Dec.: −32.410 mas/yr
Parallax (π)	0.8572±0.2549 mas
Distance	approx. 4,000 ly (approx. 1,200 pc)
Absolute magnitude (M_{V})	~ −2 – −3

Details
Mass	0.55–0.68 M_{☉}
Radius	160 (Note: Applying the Stefan–Boltzmann law with a nominal solar effective temperature of 5,772 K: $$\sqrt{\biggl(\frac{5,772}{4,500}\biggr)^4 \cdot 9,400} = 159.51\ R_\odot$$.) R_{☉}
Luminosity	9,400 L_{☉}
Surface gravity (log g)	0.0 cgs
Temperature	4,500 K
Metallicity [Fe/H]	–0.4 dex

Other designations
- HD 173819, HIP 92202, 2MASS J18472894-0542185, SAO 142620, BD−05°4760, AAVSO 1842-05

Database references
SIMBAD	data

R Scuti (R Sct) is a star in the constellation of Scutum. It is a yellow supergiant and is a pulsating variable known as an RV Tauri variable. It was discovered in 1795 by Edward Pigott at a time when only a few variable stars were known to exist.

== Observation ==
R Sct is the brightest of the RV Tau-type stars and the American Association of Variable Star Observers (AAVSO) contains over 110,000 observations of this star. At its brightest it is visible to the naked eye, and at its dimmest can be located with good binoculars. In the sky it is about 1 degree northwest of the Wild Duck Cluster (Messier 11).

RV Tauri variables often have somewhat irregular light curves, both in amplitude and period, but R Scuti is extreme. It has one of the longest periods known for an RV Tau variable, and the light curve has a number of unusual features: occasional extreme minima; intermittent standstills with only small erratic variation that may last for years; and periods of chaotic brightness changes.

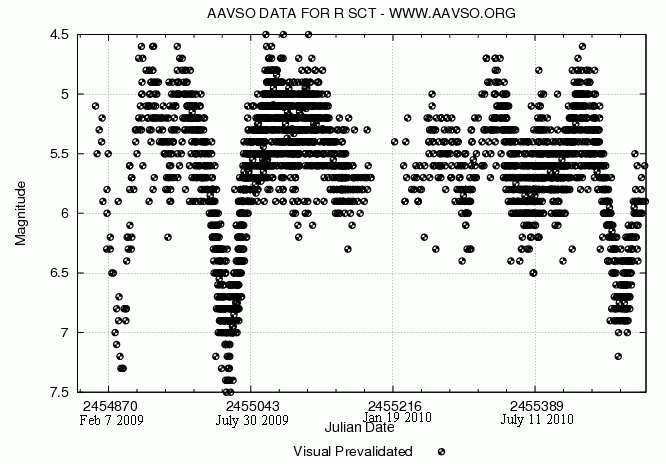
AAVSO light curve of R Sct from 1 Jan 2009 to 24 Nov 2010. Up is brighter and down is fainter. Day numbers are Julian day.

== Properties ==
The spectrum of R Scuti is peculiar, especially at cooler temperatures near the minima. In deep minima, much of the spectrum corresponds to an early K supergiant, but the spectrum also develops TiO bands more typical of an M-class star.

The recognised spectral type of G0Iae-K2p(M3)Ibe gives an idea of the complexities of this star. Both the radius and temperature change, with maximum brightness corresponding to maximum temperature. The radius changes lag and the smallest size occurs about a quarter of the period after the minimum brightness.

The spectral luminosity type classes R Sct as a supergiant, a bright supergiant (class Ia) near maximum, but it is actually thought to be a highly evolved and expanded low-mass star probably no more than 10,000 times the luminosity of the sun even at its brightest. The period–luminosity relation for type II Cepheids suggests a luminosity of 9300 L_{☉}, similar to the spectrophotometric derivation at 9400 L_{☉}. Other derivations have produced much lower values, but often making unrealistic assumptions about the distance based on an obsolete Hipparcos parallax value.

An extreme post-AGB star would be expected to show measurable secular changes in its temperature and period over the time that R Scuti has been closely observed. Instead a relatively low mass loss rate with an extended cool atmosphere and fairly constant temperature and period of variation is seen. One suggestion is that R Scuti is still a thermally pulsing AGB star, consistent with calculated levels of mass loss.

The evolutionary status of R Scuti is uncertain and estimates of the mass vary wildly. RV Tau variables as post-AGB stars are expected to have masses near or below that of the sun and this is confirmed for a number of RV Tau stars in binary systems. Old estimates based simply on the supergiant luminosity class gave much higher masses.

== See also ==
- List of variable stars
- Type II Cepheid
