= RV Tauri =

Star in the constellation Taurus

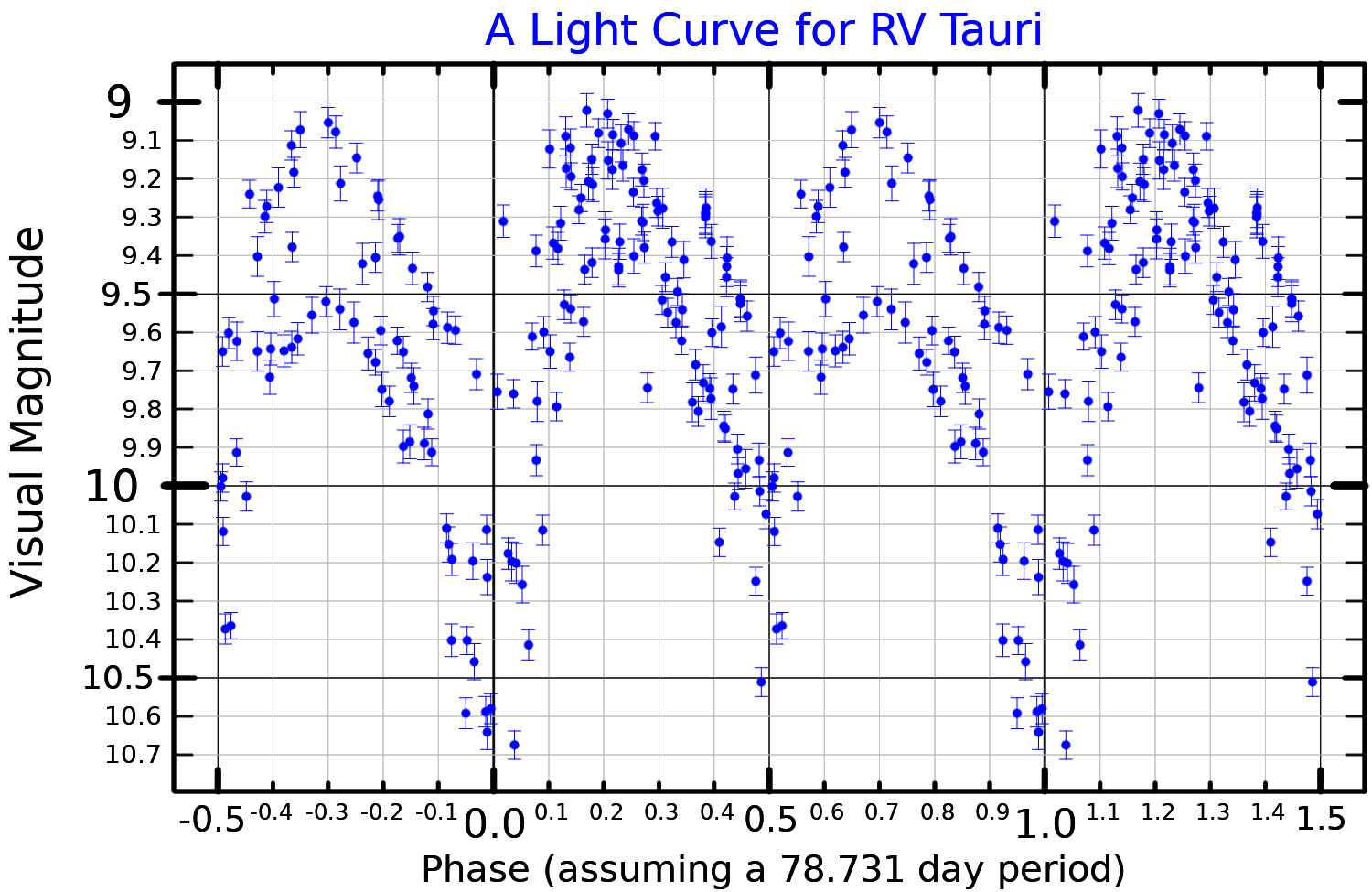
- A visual band light curve for RV Tauri, plotted from ASAS data

Observation data Epoch J2000.0 Equinox ICRS
- Constellation: Taurus
- Right ascension: 04^{h} 47^{m} 6.7281^{s}
- Declination: +26° 10′ 45.613″
- Apparent magnitude (V): 9.0–10.6

Characteristics
- Evolutionary stage: Post-AGB
- Spectral type: G2eIa-M2Ia
- U−B color index: 0.9-1.8
- B−V color index: 1.5-1.9
- Variable type: RVb

Astrometry
Radial velocity (R_{v})	+32 km/s
Proper motion (μ)	RA: 1.557 mas/yr Dec.: −4.717 mas/yr
Parallax (π)	0.6926±0.0605 mas
Distance	4,700 ± 400 ly (1,400 ± 100 pc)
Absolute magnitude (M_{V})	−3.359

Orbit
Period (P)	1,198±17 d
Semi-major axis (a)	1.5 AU
Eccentricity (e)	0.5±0.1
Inclination (i)	71±8°
Semi-amplitude (K_{1}) (primary)	14.5±1.6 km/s

Details

A
Mass	0.53 M_{☉}
Radius	83.4±12.8 R_{☉}
Luminosity	2,800 L_{☉}
Surface gravity (log g)	0.6 cgs
Temperature	4,810±200 (4,225-5,080) K
Metallicity	−0.3±0.2
Age	10 Gyr

B
Mass	0.7±0.1 M_{☉}

Other designations
- RV Tauri, RV Tau, 2MASS J04470673+2610455, GSC 01835-01075, BD+25°732, HD 283868, TYC 1835-1075-1, GCRV 2803, AAVSO 0441+26, IRAS 04440+2605

Database references
SIMBAD	data

RV Tauri (RV Tau) is a star in the constellation Taurus. It is a yellow supergiant and is the prototype of a class of pulsating variables known as RV Tauri variables. It is a post-AGB star and a spectroscopic binary about 4,700 light years away.

== Variability ==
RV Tau was discovered to be variable in 1905 by Lydia Ceraski, and by 1907 it was clear that it had minima of alternating brightness. Over a period of 78.5 days it shows two maxima at around magnitude 9.5, a minimum around magnitude 10.0, and another minimum about 0.5 magnitudes fainter. This change in brightness is caused by pulsations: the temperature and radius vary, causing some variation in luminosity but mostly a shift of the emitted radiation from visual to infrared. The spectral type varies in line with the temperature, being classified as G2 at its brightest and M2 at its dimmest. In addition to the fundamental period given, RV Tauri also shows variations in its mean brightness over a period of about 1,200 days, a characteristic which defines the subclass RVb. The maxima and minima in each period vary by several tenths of a magnitude with no obvious regularity.

== Binary system ==
RV Tauri is a single-lined spectroscopic binary. The period of 1,198 days corresponds to the long-term variations in the mean brightness of the system. These are caused by changing obscuration of the primary star by a circumstellar disc. The companion is thought to be more massive than the variable primary star, but it cannot be detected in the spectrum and it is likely to be a red dwarf. The disc surrounds both stars at a distance of about five astronomical units (AU). The stars themselves have an eccentric orbit and their separation varies between about 0.75 and 2.25 AU.

== Visibility ==
RV Tau is well placed for northern hemisphere observers during the winter months, and observations can be made from August to April. However it is faint, located in a nondescript patch of sky between the Pleiades and Beta Aurigae.

== Properties ==
The distance to RV Tau has been calculated by various methods, including modelling the atmosphere. RV Tauri stars have been shown to follow a period-luminosity relationship, and this can be used to confirm the luminosity and distance. They have low masses, but are extended cool stars of high luminosity undergoing strong mass loss. RV Tau has a luminosity of 2,800 L_{☉} but a spectral luminosity class of bright supergiant (Ia), indicating the rarified nature of its atmosphere. Its temperature varies as it pulsates, between about 4,225 K and 5,080 K.

Surface abundances show enhancement of some heavy elements, fusion products thought to have been dredged up during an earlier AGB phase. Carbon in particular is strongly in excess in RV Tau. However, its overall metallicity is lower than the Sun's.

== Evolution ==
RV Tau is likely a post-asymptotic giant branch (AGB) star, an originally sun-like star which is in the end stages of its life just prior to the expulsion of a planetary nebula and contraction to a white dwarf. RV Tau gives an insight into the lives and deaths of stars like the Sun. Evolution models show it takes about 10 billion years for a 1 solar mass (1 M_{☉}) star to reach the Asymptotic Giant Branch.
