= RV Tauri variable =

Class of luminous variable star

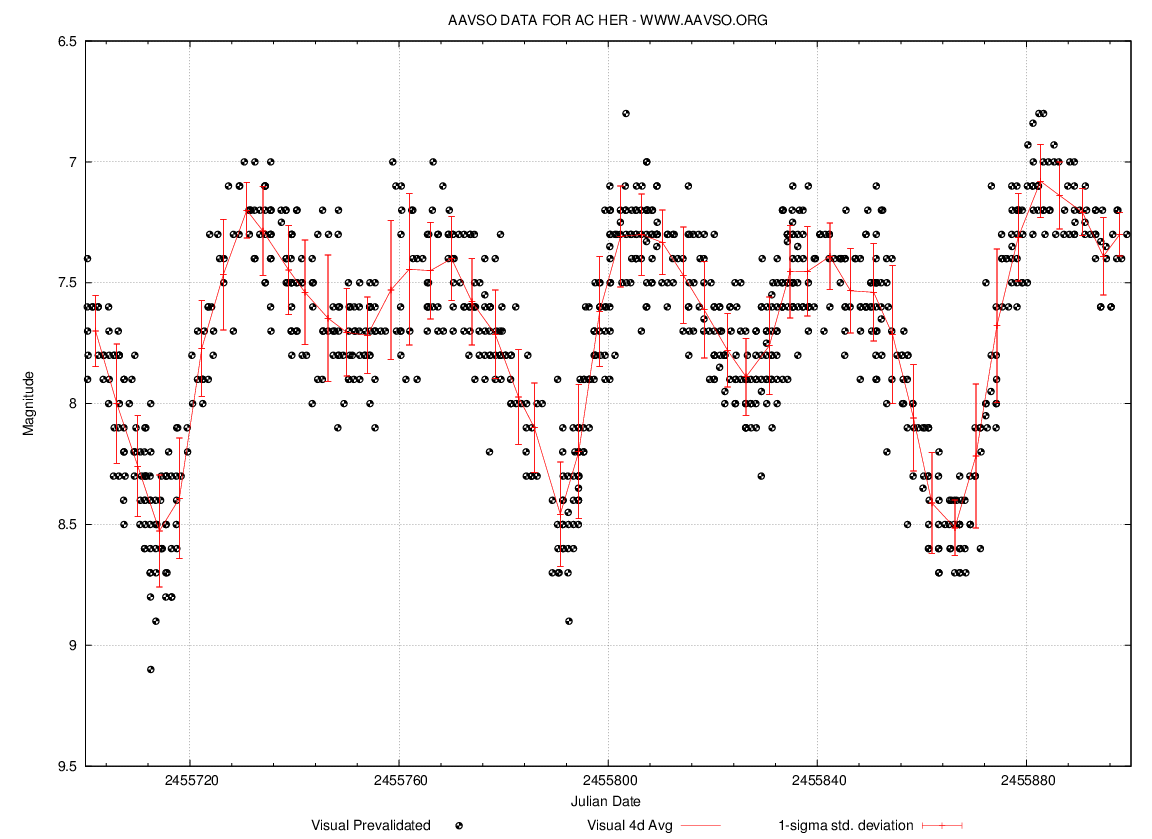
Light curve of AC Herculis, a fairly typical RV Tauri variable

RV Tauri variables are luminous variable stars that have distinctive light variations with alternating deep and shallow minima.

== History and discovery ==
German astronomer Friedrich Wilhelm Argelander monitored the distinctive variations in brightness of R Scuti from 1840 to 1850. R Sagittae was noted to be variable in 1859, but it was not until the discovery of RV Tauri by Russian astronomer Lidiya Tseraskaya in 1905 that the class of variable was recognised as distinct.

Three spectroscopic groups were identified:

- A, GK-type with spectra unambiguously of type G or K
- B, Fp(R), spectra are inconsistent, with features of F, G, and later classes found together, plus carbon (class R) features
- C, Fp, peculiar spectra with generally weak absorption lines and without strong carbon bands

RV Tauri stars are further classified into two photometric sub-types based on their light curves:

- RVa: these are RV Tauri variables which do not vary in mean brightness
- RVb: these are RV Tauri variables which show periodic variations in their mean brightness, so that their maxima and minima change on 600 to 1500 day timescales

The photometric sub-types should not be confused with the spectroscopic sub-types which use capital letters, often appended to RV: RVA; RVB; and RVC. The General Catalogue of Variable Stars uses acronyms consisting of capital letters to identify variability types, and so uses RVA and RVB to refer to the two photometric sub-types.

== Properties ==
RV Tau variables exhibit changes in luminosity which are tied to radial pulsations of their surfaces. Their changes in brightness are also correlated with changes in their spectral type. While at their brightest, the stars have spectral types F or G. At their dimmest, their spectral types change to K or M. The difference between maximum and minimum brightness can be as much as four magnitudes. The period of brightness fluctuations from one deep minimum to the next is typically around 30 to 150 days, and exhibits alternating primary and secondary minima, which can change relative to each other. For comparison with other type II Cepheids such as W Virginis variables, this formal period is twice the fundamental pulsation period. Therefore, although the approximate division between W Vir variables and RV Tau variables is at a fundamental pulsation period of 20 days, RV Tau variables are typically described with periods of 40–150 days.

The pulsations cause the star to be hottest and smallest approximately halfway from the primary minimum towards a maximum. The coolest temperatures are reached near to a deep minimum. When the brightness is increasing, hydrogen emission lines appear in the spectrum and many spectral lines become doubled, due to a shock wave in the atmosphere. The emission lines fade a few days after maximum brightness.

The prototype of these variables, RV Tauri is a RVb type variable which exhibits brightness variations between magnitudes +9.8 and +13.3 with a formal period of 78.7 days. The brightest member of the class, R Scuti, is an RVa type, with an apparent magnitude varying from 4.6 to 8.9 and a formal period of 146.5 days. AC Herculis is an example of an RVa type variable.

The luminosity of RV Tau variables is typically a few thousand times the sun, which places them at the upper end of the W Virginis instability strip. Therefore, RV Tau variables along with W Vir variables are sometimes considered a subclass of Type II Cepheids. They exhibit relationships between their periods, masses, and luminosity, although not with the precision of more conventional Cepheid variables. Although the spectra appear as supergiants, usually Ib, occasionally Ia, the actual luminosities are only a few thousand times the sun. The supergiant luminosity classes are due to very low surface gravities on pulsating low-mass and rarefied stars.

== Evolution ==
The evolutionary track of a solar mass, solar metallicity, star from main sequence to post-AGB

RV Tauri variables are very luminous stars and are typically given a supergiant spectral luminosity class. However they are relatively low mass objects, not young massive stars. They are thought to be stars that started out similar to the sun and have now evolved to the end of the Asymptotic Giant Branch (AGB). Late AGB stars become increasingly unstable, show large amplitude variations as Mira variables, experience thermal pulses as internal hydrogen and helium shells alternate fusing, and rapidly lose mass. Eventually the hydrogen shell gets too close to the surface and is unable to trigger further pulses from the deeper helium shell, and the hot interior starts to be revealed by the loss of the outer layers. These post-AGB objects start to become hotter, heading towards becoming a white dwarf and possibly a planetary nebula.

As a post-AGB star heats up it will cross the instability strip and the star will pulsate in the same way as a conventional Cepheid variable. These are theorised to be the RV Tauri stars. Such stars are clearly metal-deficient Population II stars since it takes around 10 billion years for stars of that mass to evolve beyond the AGB. Their masses are now less than 1 M_{☉} even for stars that were initially B class on the main sequence.

Although a post-AGB crossing of the instability strip should happen in a period measured in thousands of years, even hundreds for the more massive examples, the known RV Tau stars have not shown the secular increase in temperature that would be expected. The main sequence progenitor of this type of star has a mass near to that of the sun, although they have already lost about half of that during red giant and AGB phases. They are also thought to be mostly binaries surrounded by a dusty disc.

== Brightest Members ==
There are just over 100 known RV Tauri stars. The brightest RV Tauri stars are listed below.

Star	Brightest Magnitude	Dimmest Magnitude	Period (days)	Distance (parsecs)	Luminosity (L_{☉})	Radius R_{☉}	Temperature (K)
R Sct (Note: R Sct may be less luminous than given in the table. It may be a thermal-pulsing AGB star, observed in a helium-burning phase instead of a post-AGB star.)	4.2	8.6	140.2	750±290	9,400±7,100		4,500
U Mon	5.1	7.1	92.26	1,111+137 −102	5,480+1,764 −882	100.3+18.9 −13.2	5,000
AC Her	6.4	8.7	75.4619	1,276+49 −44	2,475+183 −209	47.1+4.7 −4.1	5,900
V Vul	8.1	9.4	75.72	1,854+160 −140	2,169+504 −315	77.9+13.0 −10.1	4,500
AR Sgr	8.1	12.5	87.87	2,910	1,368	58	4,627
SS Gem (Note: SS Gem is likely to be a population I Cepheid)	8.3	9.7	89.31	3,423+836 −488	17,680+12,800 −6,400	150.6+41.7 −34.8	5,600
R Sge	8.5	10.5	70.594	2,475+353 −229	2,329+744 −638	61.2+12.4 −9.9	5,100
AI Sco	8.5	11.7	71.0				4,260
TX Oph	8.8	11.1	135	5,368			4,282
RV Tau	8.8	12.3	76.698	1,460+153 −117	2,453+605 −403	83.4+12.8 −12.8	4,500
SX Cen	9.1	12.4	32.967	4,429+1,071 −605	3,684+2,315 −842	61.1+14.7 −9.8	6,000
UZ Oph	9.2	11.8	87.44	6,676			4,232
TW Cam (Note: TW Cam distance estimate may be too large.)	9.4	10.5	85.6	2,700±260	3,000±600	58	4,700
TT Oph	9.4	11.2	61.08	2,535+221 −172	714+131 −102	38.5+5.4 −4.5	5,000
UY CMa	9.8	11.8	113.9	8,400±3,100	4,500±3,300		5,500
DF Cyg	9.8	14.2	49.8080	2,737+240 −186	815+155 −116	39.9+6.4 −4.5	4,840
CT Ori	9.9	11.2	135.52				4,822
SU Gem	9.9	12.2	50.12	2,110±660	1,200±770		5,750
HP Lyr	10.2	10.8	70.4	6,700±380	3,900±400		5,900
Z Aps	10.7	12.7	37.89	3,600	519	31.5	4,909
AF Crt	10.87	11.47	31.16	4,320±1,100	1,700±750	41.63	5,750

== See also ==
- List of variable stars
- Low-dimensional chaos in stellar pulsations
