= Supergiant =

Type of star that is massive and luminous

Supergiants are among the most massive and most luminous stars. Supergiant stars occupy the top region of the Hertzsprung–Russell diagram, with absolute visual magnitudes between about −3 and −8. The temperatures of supergiant stars range from about 3,400 K to over 20,000 K.

== Definition ==
The title supergiant, as applied to a star, does not have a single concrete definition. The term giant star was first coined by Ejnar Hertzsprung when it became apparent that the majority of stars fell into two distinct regions of the Hertzsprung–Russell diagram. One region contained larger and more luminous stars of spectral types A to M, which received the name giant. Subsequently, as they lacked any measurable parallax, it became apparent that some of these stars were significantly larger and more luminous than the bulk, and the term super-giant arose, quickly adopted as supergiant.

Supergiants with spectral classes of O to A are typically referred to as blue supergiants, supergiants with spectral classes F and G are referred to as yellow supergiants, while those of spectral classes K to M are red supergiants. Another convention uses temperature: Supergiants with effective temperatures below 4800 K are deemed red supergiants; those with temperatures between 4800 and 7500 K are yellow supergiants, and those with temperatures exceeding 7500 K are blue supergiants. These correspond approximately to spectral types M and K for red supergiants, G, F, and late A for yellow supergiants, and early A, B, and O for blue supergiants.

=== Spectral luminosity class ===
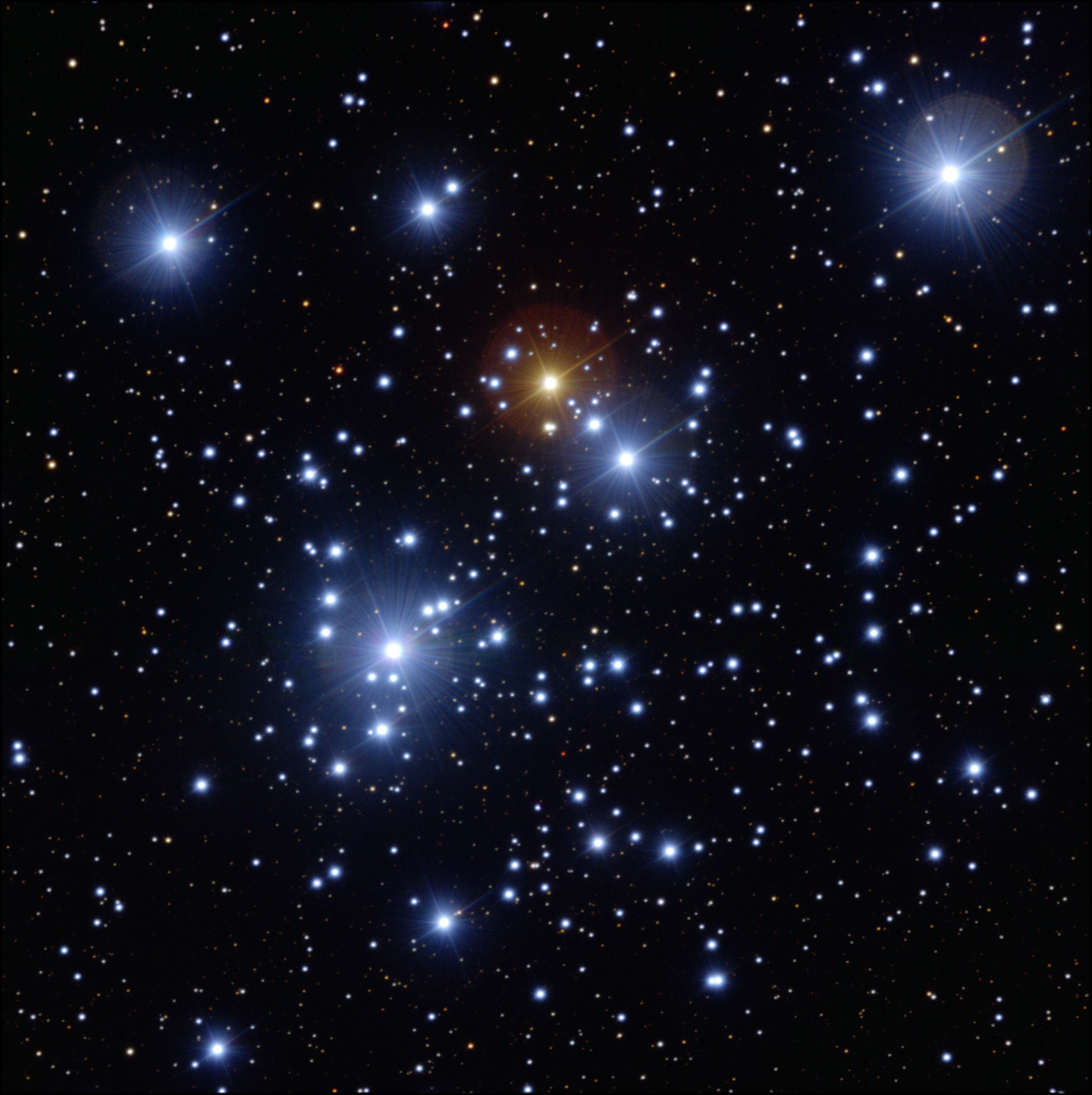
The four brightest stars in NGC 4755 are blue supergiant stars, with a red supergiant star at the centre. (ESO VLT)

Supergiant stars can be identified on the basis of their spectra, with distinctive lines sensitive to high luminosity and low surface gravity. In 1897, Antonia C. Maury had divided stars based on the widths of their spectral lines, with her class "c" identifying stars with the narrowest lines. Although it was not known at the time, these were the most luminous stars. In 1943, Morgan and Keenan formalised the definition of spectral luminosity classes, with class I referring to supergiant stars. The same system of MK luminosity classes is still used today, with refinements based on the increased resolution of modern spectra. Supergiants occur in every spectral class, from young blue class O supergiants to highly evolved red class M supergiants. Because they are enlarged compared with main-sequence and giant stars of the same spectral type, they have lower surface gravities, and changes can be observed in their line profiles. Supergiants are also evolved stars with higher levels of heavy elements than main-sequence stars. This is the basis of the MK luminosity system, which assigns stars to luminosity classes purely from observations of their spectra.

In addition to the line changes due to low surface gravity and fusion products, the most luminous stars have high mass-loss rates and resulting clouds of expelled circumstellar materials, which can produce emission lines, P Cygni profiles, or forbidden lines. The MK system assigns stars to luminosity classes: Ib for supergiants; Ia for luminous supergiants; and 0 (zero) or Ia^{+} for hypergiants. In reality there is much more of a continuum than well-defined bands for these classifications, and classifications such as Iab are used for intermediate-luminosity supergiants. Supergiant spectra are frequently annotated to indicate spectral peculiarities, for example B2 Iae or F5 Ipec.

=== Evolutionary supergiants ===
Supergiants can also be defined by a specific phase in the evolutionary history of certain stars. Stars with initial masses above 8-10 M_{☉} quickly and smoothly initiate helium-core fusion after they have exhausted their hydrogen, and continue fusing heavier elements after helium exhaustion until they develop an iron core, at which point the core collapses to produce a Type II supernova. Once these massive stars leave the main sequence, their atmospheres inflate, and they are described as supergiants.

Stars initially under 10 M_{☉} will never form an iron core and in evolutionary terms do not become supergiants, although they can reach luminosities thousands of times the Sun's. They cannot fuse carbon and heavier elements after the helium is exhausted, so they eventually just lose their outer layers, leaving the core of a white dwarf. The phase where these stars have both hydrogen- and helium-burning shells is referred to as the asymptotic giant branch (AGB), as stars gradually become more and more luminous class M stars. Stars of 8-10 M_{☉} may fuse sufficient carbon on the AGB to produce an oxygen-neon core and an electron-capture supernova, but astrophysicists categorise these as super-AGB stars rather than supergiants.

=== Categorisation of evolved stars ===
There are several categories of evolved stars that are not supergiants in evolutionary terms but may show supergiant spectral features or have luminosities comparable to supergiants.

Asymptotic-giant-branch (AGB) and post-AGB stars are highly evolved lower-mass red giants with luminosities that can be comparable to more massive red supergiants, but because of their low mass, their being in a different stage of development (helium shell burning), and their lives ending in a different way (planetary nebula and white dwarf rather than supernova), astrophysicists prefer to keep them separate. The dividing line becomes blurred at around 7–10 M_{☉} (or as high as 12 M_{☉} in some models), where stars start to undergo limited fusion of elements heavier than helium. Specialists studying these stars often refer to them as super AGB stars, since they have many properties in common with AGB, such as thermal pulsing. Others describe them as low-mass supergiants since they start to burn elements heavier than helium and can explode as supernovae. Many post-AGB stars receive spectral types with supergiant luminosity classes. For example, RV Tauri has an Ia (bright supergiant) luminosity class despite being less massive than the Sun. Some AGB stars also receive a supergiant luminosity class, most notably W Virginis variables such as W Virginis itself, stars that are executing a blue loop triggered by thermal pulsing. A very small number of Mira variables and other late AGB stars have supergiant luminosity classes, for example α Herculis.

Classical Cepheid variables typically have supergiant luminosity classes, although only the most luminous and massive will actually go on to develop an iron core. The majority of them are intermediate-mass stars fusing helium in their cores and will eventually transition to the asymptotic giant branch. δ Cephei itself is an example, with a luminosity of 2,000 L_{☉} and a mass of 4.5 M_{☉}.

Wolf–Rayet stars are also high-mass luminous evolved stars, hotter, smaller, and visually less bright than most supergiants but often more luminous because of their high temperatures. They have spectra dominated by helium and other heavier elements, usually showing little or no hydrogen, which is a clue to their nature as stars even more evolved than supergiants. Just as the AGB stars occur in almost the same region of the HR diagram as red supergiants, Wolf–Rayet stars can occur in the same region of the HR diagram as the hottest blue supergiants and main-sequence stars.

The most massive and luminous main-sequence stars are almost indistinguishable from the supergiants they quickly evolve into. They have almost identical temperatures and very similar luminosities, and only the most detailed analyses can distinguish the spectral features that show they have evolved away from the narrow early O-type main-sequence to the nearby area of early O-type supergiants. Such early O-type supergiants share many features with WNLh Wolf–Rayet stars and are sometimes designated as slash stars, intermediates between the two types.

Luminous blue variables (LBVs) stars occur in the same region of the HR diagram as blue supergiants but are generally classified separately. They are evolved, expanded, massive, and luminous stars, often hypergiants, but they have a very specific spectral variability that defies assignment of a standard spectral type. LBVs observed only at a particular time, or over a period of time when they are stable, may simply be designated as hot supergiants or as candidate LBVs due to their luminosity.

Hypergiants are frequently treated as a different category of star from supergiants, although in all important respects they are just a more luminous category of supergiant. They are evolved, expanded, massive and luminous stars like supergiants, but at the most massive and luminous extreme, and with particular additional properties of undergoing high mass loss due to their extreme luminosities and instability. Generally only the more evolved supergiants show hypergiant properties, since their instability increases after high mass loss and some increase in luminosity.

Some B(e) stars are supergiants, although other B[e] stars are clearly not. Some researchers distinguish the B[e] objects as separate from supergiants, while researchers prefer to define massive evolved B[e] stars as a subgroup of supergiants. The latter has become more common, with the understanding that the B[e] phenomenon arises separately in a number of distinct types of stars, including some that are clearly just a phase in the life of supergiants.

== Properties ==
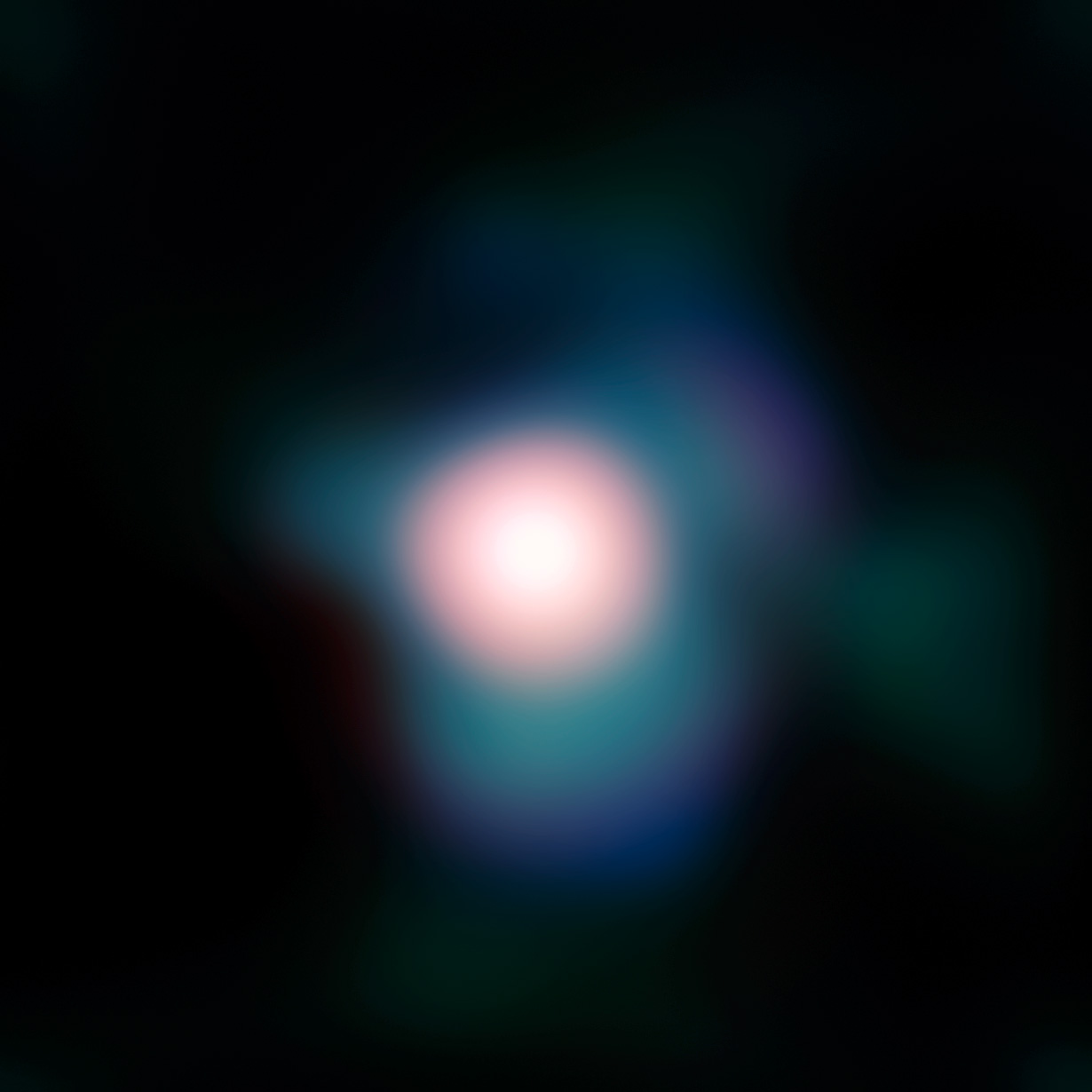
The disc and atmosphere of Betelgeuse (ESO)

Supergiants have masses from 8 to 12 times the Sun (M_{☉}) upwards, and luminosities from about 1,000 to over a million times the Sun (L_{☉}). They vary greatly in radius, usually from 30 to 500 or even in excess of 1,000 solar radii (R_{☉}). They are massive enough to begin helium-core burning gently before the core becomes degenerate, without a flash and without the strong dredge-ups that lower-mass stars experience. They go on to ignite successively heavier elements, usually all the way to iron. Also because of their high masses, they are destined to explode as supernovae.

The Stefan–Boltzmann law dictates that the relatively cool surfaces of red supergiants radiate much less energy per unit area than those of blue supergiants; thus, for a given luminosity, red supergiants are larger than their blue counterparts. Radiation pressure limits the largest cool supergiants to around 1,500 R_{☉} and the most massive hot supergiants to around a million L_{☉} (M_{bol} around −10). Stars near and occasionally beyond these limits become unstable, pulsate, and experience rapid mass loss.

=== Surface gravity ===
The supergiant luminosity class is assigned on the basis of spectral features that are largely a measure of surface gravity, although such stars are also affected by other properties such as microturbulence. Supergiants typically have surface gravities of around log(g) 2.0 cgs and lower, although bright giants (luminosity class II) have statistically very similar surface gravities to normal Ib supergiants. Cool luminous supergiants have lower surface gravities, with the most luminous (and unstable) stars having log(g) around zero. Hotter supergiants, even the most luminous, have surface gravities around one, due to their higher masses and smaller radii.

=== Temperature ===
There are supergiant stars at all of the main spectral classes and across the whole range of temperatures, from mid-M class stars at around 3,400 K to the hottest O class stars over 40,000 K. Supergiants are generally not found cooler than mid-M class. This is expected theoretically since they would be catastrophically unstable; however, there are potential exceptions among extreme stars such as VX Sagittarii.

Although supergiants exist in every class from O to M, the majority are spectral type B (blue supergiants), more than all other spectral classes combined. A much smaller grouping consists of very low-luminosity G-type supergiants, intermediate-mass stars burning helium in their cores before reaching the asymptotic giant branch. A distinct grouping is made up of high-luminosity supergiants at early B (B0-2) and very late O (O9.5), more common even than main-sequence stars of those spectral types. The number of post–main-sequence blue supergiants is greater than those expected from theoretical models, leading to the "blue supergiant problem".

The relative numbers of blue, yellow, and red supergiants serve as an indicator of the speed of stellar evolution and are used as a powerful test of models of the evolution of massive stars.

=== Luminosity ===
The supergiants lie more or less on a horizontal band occupying the entire upper portion of the HR diagram, but there are some variations at different spectral types. These variations are due partly to different methods for assigning luminosity classes at different spectral types, and partly to actual physical differences in the stars.

The bolometric luminosity of a star reflects its total output of electromagnetic radiation at all wavelengths. For very hot and very cool stars, the bolometric luminosity is much higher than the visual luminosity, sometimes several magnitudes or a factor of five or more. This bolometric correction is approximately one magnitude for mid B, late K, and early M stars, increasing to three magnitudes (a factor of 15) for O and mid M stars.

All supergiants are larger and more luminous than main-sequence stars of the same temperature. This means that hot supergiants lie on a relatively narrow band above bright main-sequence stars. A B0 main-sequence star has an absolute magnitude of about −5, meaning that all B0 supergiants are significantly brighter than absolute magnitude −5. Bolometric luminosities for even the faintest blue supergiants are tens of thousands of times the Sun (L_{☉}). The brightest can be over a million L_{☉} and are often unstable, such as α Cygni variables and luminous blue variables.

The very hottest supergiants with early O spectral types occur in an extremely narrow range of luminosities above the highly luminous early O main-sequence and giant stars. They are not classified separately into normal (Ib) and luminous (Ia) supergiants, although they commonly have other spectral type modifiers such as "f" for nitrogen and helium emission (e.g. O2 If for HD 93129A).

Yellow supergiants can be considerably fainter than absolute magnitude −5, with some examples around −2 (e.g. 14 Persei). With bolometric corrections around zero, they may only be a few hundred times the luminosity of the Sun. These are not massive stars, though; instead, they are stars of intermediate mass that have particularly low surface gravities, often due to instability such as Cepheid pulsations. These intermediate-mass stars' being classified as supergiants during a relatively long-lasting phase of their evolution accounts for the large number of low-luminosity yellow supergiants. The most luminous yellow stars, the yellow hypergiants, are amongst the visually brightest stars, with absolute magnitudes around −9, although still less than a million L_{☉}.

There is a strong upper limit to the luminosity of red supergiants at around half a million L_{☉}. Stars that would be brighter than this shed their outer layers so rapidly that they remain hot supergiants after they leave the main sequence. The majority of red supergiants were 10-15 M_{☉} main-sequence stars and now have luminosities below 100,000 L_{☉}, and there are very few bright supergiant (Ia) M class stars. The least luminous stars classified as red supergiants are some of the brightest AGB and post-AGB stars, highly expanded and unstable low-mass stars such as the RV Tauri variables. The majority of AGB stars are assigned giant or bright giant luminosity classes, but particularly unstable stars such as W Virginis variables may be given a supergiant classification (e.g. W Virginis itself). The faintest red supergiants are around absolute magnitude −3.

=== Variability ===
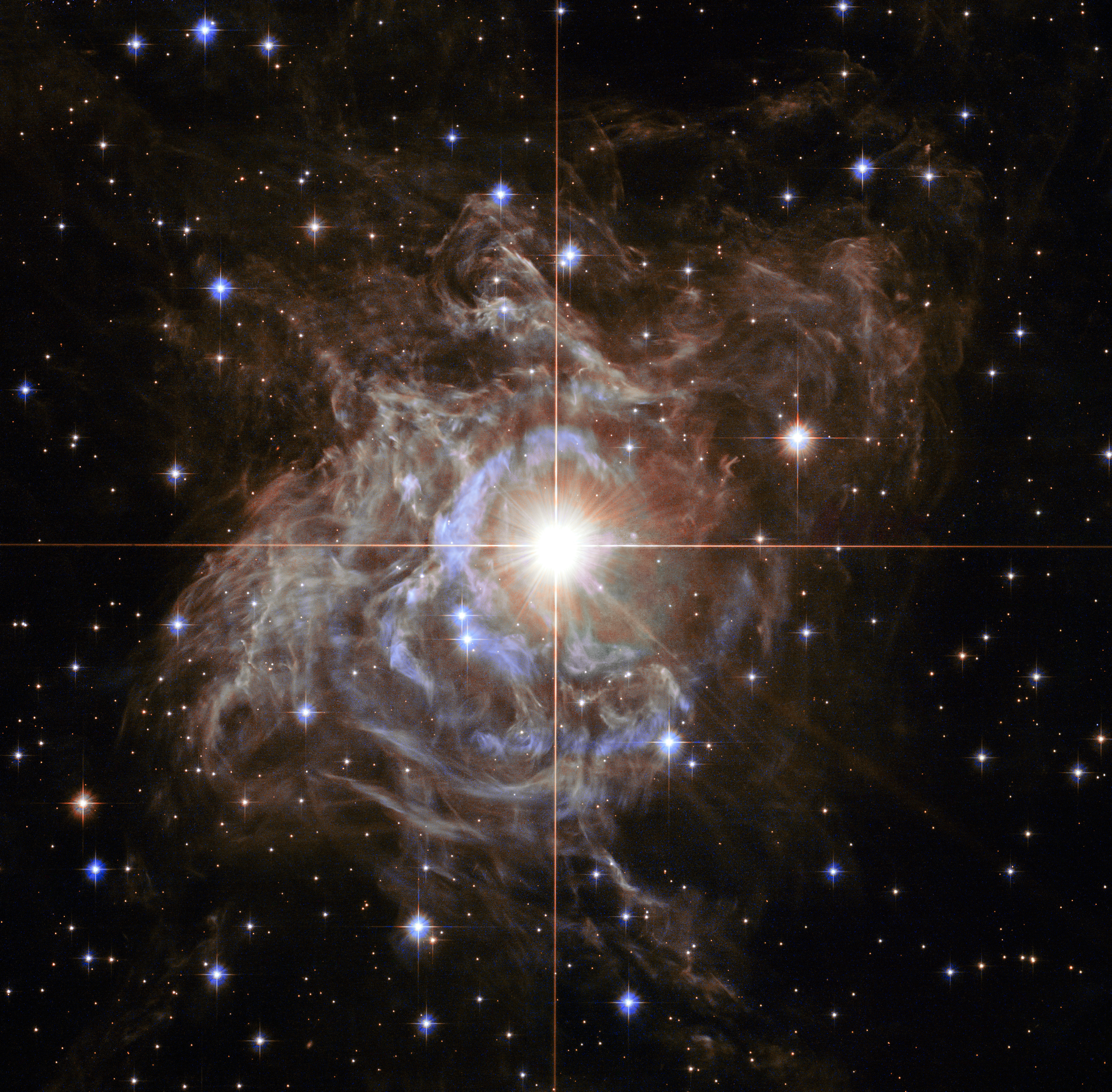
RS Puppis is a supergiant and classical Cepheid variable.

While most supergiants such as Alpha Cygni variables, semiregular variables, and irregular variables show some degree of photometric variability, certain types of variables amongst the supergiants are well defined. The instability strip crosses the region of supergiants, and specifically many yellow supergiants are classical Cepheid variables. The same region of instability extends to include the even more luminous yellow hypergiants, an extremely rare and short-lived class of luminous supergiant. Many R Coronae Borealis variables, although not all, are yellow supergiants, but this variability is due to their unusual chemical composition rather than a physical instability.

Further types of variable stars such as RV Tauri variables and PV Telescopii variables are often described as supergiants. RV Tau stars are frequently assigned spectral types with a supergiant luminosity class on account of their low surface gravity, and they are amongst the most luminous of the AGB and post-AGB stars, having masses similar to the Sun; likewise, the even rarer PV Tel variables are often classified as supergiants, but have lower luminosities than supergiants and peculiar B[e] spectra extremely deficient in hydrogen. Possibly they are also post-AGB objects or "born-again" AGB stars.

The LBVs are variable, with multiple semi-regular periods and less predictable eruptions and giant outbursts. They are usually supergiants or hypergiants, occasionally with Wolf–Rayet spectra—extremely luminous, massive, evolved stars with expanded outer layers—but they are so distinctive and unusual that they are often treated as a separate category without being referred to as supergiants or given a supergiant spectral type. Often their spectral type will be given just as "LBV" because they have peculiar and highly variable spectral features, with temperatures varying from about 8,000 K in outburst up to 20,000 K or more when "quiescent".

=== Chemical abundances ===
The abundance of various elements at the surfaces of supergiants is different from less luminous stars. Supergiants are evolved stars and may have undergone convection of fusion products to the surface.

Cool supergiants show enhanced helium and nitrogen at the surface, caused by convection of these fusion products to the surface during the main sequence of very massive stars, by dredge-ups during shell burning, or by the loss of the outer layers of the star. Helium is formed in the core and shell by fusion of hydrogen and nitrogen, which accumulate relative to carbon and oxygen during CNO cycle fusion. At the same time, carbon and oxygen abundances are reduced. Red supergiants can be distinguished from luminous but less massive AGB stars by unusual chemicals at the surface, enhancement of carbon from deep third dredge-ups, as well as carbon-13, lithium and s-process elements. Late-phase AGB stars can become highly oxygen-enriched, producing OH masers.

Hotter supergiants show differing levels of nitrogen enrichment. This may be due to different levels of mixing on the main sequence due to rotation or because some blue supergiants are newly evolved from the main sequence while others have previously been through a red supergiant phase. Post-red-supergiant stars have a generally higher level of nitrogen relative to carbon due to convection of CNO-processed material to the surface and the complete loss of the outer layers. Surface enhancement of helium is also stronger in post-red supergiants, representing more than a third of the atmosphere.

== Evolution ==
O type main-sequence stars and the most massive of the B type blue-white stars become supergiants. Due to their extreme masses, they have short lifespans, between 30 million years and a few hundred thousand years. They are observed mainly in young galactic structures such as open clusters, in the arms of spiral galaxies, and in irregular galaxies. They are less abundant in spiral galaxy bulges, and are rarely observed in elliptical galaxies or globular clusters, which are composed mainly of old stars.

Supergiants develop when massive main-sequence stars run out of hydrogen in their cores, at which point they start to expand, just like lower-mass stars. Unlike lower-mass stars, however, they begin to fuse helium in the core smoothly and not long after exhausting their hydrogen. This means that they do not increase their luminosity as dramatically as lower-mass stars, and they progress nearly horizontally across the HR diagram, becoming red supergiants. Also unlike lower-mass stars, red supergiants are massive enough to fuse elements heavier than helium, so they do not puff off their atmospheres as planetary nebulae after a period of hydrogen and helium shell burning; instead, they continue to burn heavier elements in their cores until they collapse. They cannot lose enough mass to form a white dwarf, so they will leave behind a neutron star or black hole remnant, usually after a core-collapse supernova explosion.

Stars more massive than about 40 M_{☉} cannot expand into red supergiants. Because they burn too quickly and lose their outer layers too quickly, they reach the blue supergiant stage, or perhaps yellow hypergiant, before returning to become hotter stars. The most massive stars, above about 100 M_{☉}, hardly move at all from their position as O main-sequence stars. These convect so efficiently that they mix hydrogen from the surface right down to the core. They continue to fuse hydrogen until it is almost entirely depleted throughout the star, then rapidly evolve through a series of stages of similarly hot and luminous stars: supergiants, slash stars, WNh-, WN-, and possibly WC- or WO-type stars. They are expected to explode as supernovae, but it is not clear how far they evolve before this happens. The existence of these supergiants still burning hydrogen in their cores may necessitate a slightly more complex definition of supergiant: a massive star with increased size and luminosity due to fusion products building up, but still with some hydrogen remaining.

The first stars in the universe are thought to have been considerably brighter and more massive than the stars in the modern universe. Part of the theorized population III of stars, their existence is necessary to explain observations of elements other than hydrogen and helium in quasars. Possibly larger and more luminous than any supergiant known today, they had a quite different structure, with reduced convection and less mass loss. Their very short lives are likely to have ended in violent photodisintegration or pair-instability supernovae.

== Supernova progenitors ==
Most Type II supernova progenitors are thought to be red supergiants, while the less common Type Ib/c supernova is produced by a hotter Wolf–Rayet star that has completely lost more of its hydrogen atmosphere. Almost by definition, supergiants are destined to end their lives violently. Stars large enough to start fusing elements heavier than helium do not seem to have any way to lose enough mass to avoid catastrophic core collapse, although some may collapse, almost without trace, into their own central black holes.

The simple "onion" models showing red supergiants inevitably developing to an iron core and then exploding have been shown, however, to be too simplistic. The progenitor for the unusual Type II Supernova 1987A was a blue supergiant, thought to have already passed through the red supergiant phase of its life; and this is now known to be far from an exceptional situation. Much research is now focused on how blue supergiants can explode as supernovae and when red supergiants can survive to become hotter supergiants again.

== Well-known examples ==
Supergiants are rare and short-lived stars, but their high luminosity means that there are many naked-eye examples, including some of the brightest stars in the sky. Rigel, the brightest star in the constellation Orion, is a typical blue-white supergiant; the three stars of Orion's Belt are all blue supergiants; Deneb, another blue supergiant, is the brightest star in Cygnus; and Delta Cephei (itself the prototype) and Polaris are Cepheid variables and yellow supergiants. Antares and VV Cephei A are red supergiants. Garnet Star is considered a red hypergiant due to its large luminosity; it is one of the reddest stars visible to the naked eye and one of the largest in the galaxy. Rho Cassiopeiae, a variable yellow hypergiant, is one of the most luminous naked-eye stars. Betelgeuse is a red supergiant that may have been a yellow supergiant in antiquity, and is the second-brightest star in the constellation Orion.

== See also ==
- List of stars with resolved images
- List of largest stars
