= Post-AGB star =

Type of luminous supergiant star

A post-AGB star (pAGB, abbreviation of post-asymptotic giant branch) is a type of luminous low-mass supergiant star of intermediate mass in a very late phase of stellar evolution. The post-AGB stage occurs after the asymptotic giant branch (AGB or second-ascent red giant) has ended. The stage sees the dying star, initially very cool and large, shrink and heat up. The duration of the post-AGB stage varies based on the star's initial mass, and can range from 100,000 years for a solar-mass star to just over 1,000 years for more massive stars. The timescale gets slightly shorter with lower metallicity.

Towards the end of this stage, post-AGB stars also tend to produce protoplanetary nebulae as they shed their outer layers, and this creates a large infrared excess and obscures the stars in visible light. After reaching an effective temperature of about 30,000 K, the star is able to ionise its surrounding nebula, producing a true planetary nebula.

== Properties ==
Post-AGB stars span a large range of temperatures, as they are in the process of heating up from very cool temperatures (3,000 K or less) up to about 30,000 K. Technically, the post-AGB stage only ends when the star reaches its maximum temperature of 100-200,000 K, but beyond 30,000 K, the star ionises the surrounding gas and would be considered a central star of a planetary nebula more often than a post-AGB star.

On the other hand, the luminosity of post-AGB stars is usually constant throughout the post-AGB stage, and slightly dependent on the star's core mass, and getting slightly brighter with lower metallicity.

== Examples ==
Due to the dust usually obscuring them, many post-AGB stars are visually relatively dim. However there are still some post-AGB stars visible to the naked eye, the brightest of which is 89 Herculis.

Other examples include:

- RV Tauri
- R Scuti
- U Monocerotis
