= List of stars in Triangulum Australe =

This is the list of notable stars in the constellation Triangulum Australe, sorted by decreasing brightness.

Name	B	Var	HD	HIP	RA	Dec	vis. mag.	abs. mag.	Dist. (ly)	Sp. class	Notes
α TrA	α		150798	82273	16^{h} 48^{m} 39.87^{s}	−69° 01′ 39.5″	1.91	−3.62	391	K2IIb-IIIa	Atria, possible binary star
β TrA	β		141891	77952	15^{h} 55^{m} 08.81^{s}	−63° 25′ 47.1″	2.83	2.38	40	F1 V	
γ TrA	γ		135382	74946	15^{h} 18^{m} 54.69^{s}	−68° 40′ 46.1″	2.87	−0.87	183	A1V	
δ TrA	δ		145544	79664	16^{h} 15^{m} 26.27^{s}	−63° 41′ 08.3″	3.86	−2.54	621	G5II	
ε TrA	ε		138538	76440	15^{h} 36^{m} 43.19^{s}	−66° 19′ 00.9″	4.11	0.00	216	K0III	
ζ TrA	ζ		147584	80686	16^{h} 28^{m} 27.80^{s}	−70° 05′ 04.8″	4.90	4.49	39	F9V	
LP TrA		LP	150549	82129	16^{h} 46^{m} 40.01^{s}	−67° 06′ 34.8″	5.10	−1.32	626	A0II-IIIp	α² CVn variable, ΔV = 0.033^{m}, P = 3.76 d
κ TrA	κ		141767	77982	15^{h} 55^{m} 29.61^{s}	−68° 36′ 10.8″	5.11	−4.70	2991	G6IIa	semiregular variable, V_{max} = 5.08^{m}, V_{min} = 5.11^{m}, P = 600 d
HD 148291			148291	80874	16^{h} 30^{m} 49.37^{s}	−61° 38′ 00.5″	5.19	−1.37	669	K0II/IIICN.	
ι TrA	ι		147787	80645	16^{h} 27^{m} 57.27^{s}	−64° 03′ 28.8″	5.28	2.25	132	F4IV	γ Dor variable, triple star
θ TrA	θ		148890	81252	16^{h} 35^{m} 44.77^{s}	−65° 29′ 43.2″	5.50	0.49	328	G8/K0III	
HD 140483			140483	77390	15^{h} 47^{m} 53.10^{s}	−65° 26′ 31.9″	5.54	0.06	406	A5	
LX TrA		LX	137066	75665	15^{h} 27^{m} 33.10^{s}	−64° 31′ 53.2″	5.71	−0.88	679	K5/M0III	semiregular variable
HD 142514	λ (Note: Appeared in Bode's Uranographia Ioannis Elerte Bode uranographia) (Note: Mentioned in Gould's Uranometria (URANOMETRIA ARGENTINA))		142514	78279	15^{h} 58^{m} 58.16^{s}	−65° 02′ 15.2″	5.74	−1.08	753	B7III	
X TrA		X	134453	74582	15^{h} 14^{m} 19.17^{s}	−70° 04′ 46.0″	5.75	−2.56	1495	C5.5	semiregular variable, V_{max} = 5.03^{m}, V_{min} = 6.05^{m}, P = 361.1 d
HD 133683			133683	74184	15^{h} 09^{m} 29.92^{s}	−67° 05′ 02.9″	5.76	−5.58	6037	F8Iab-Ib	
HD 142139			142139	78045	15^{h} 56^{m} 05.96^{s}	−60° 28′ 56.3″	5.76	1.66	215	A3V	
MX TrA		MX	152564	83150	16^{h} 59^{m} 33.98^{s}	−69° 16′ 05.3″	5.79	−1.60	982	Ap Si	α² CVn variable
HD 136672			136672	75565	15^{h} 26^{m} 14.53^{s}	−68° 18′ 33.1″	5.89	0.84	334	K0III	
η^{1} TrA	η^{1}		149671	81710	16^{h} 41^{m} 23.13^{s}	−68° 17′ 45.9″	5.89	−0.73	688	B7IV	
HD 145689			145689	79797	16^{h} 17^{m} 05.48^{s}	−67° 56′ 27.9″	5.95	2.24	180	A4V	suspected variable
HD 150026			150026	81873	16^{h} 43^{m} 22.11^{s}	−67° 25′ 56.3″	6.02	1.17	305	A0Vn	suspected variable
HD 151441			151441	82517	16^{h} 51^{m} 53.88^{s}	−65° 22′ 31.5″	6.12	−1.20	948	B8II/III	
HD 141913			141913	77927	15^{h} 54^{m} 52.64^{s}	−60° 44′ 37.1″	6.14	−2.45	1707	B9II	suspected variable, V_{max} = 6.11^{m}, V_{min} = 6.15^{m}
HD 147349			147349	80455	16^{h} 25^{m} 22.15^{s}	−63° 07′ 30.9″	6.14	0.55	428	A1V	
HD 133456			133456	74047	15^{h} 07^{m} 56.75^{s}	−65° 16′ 31.6″	6.18	−0.75	793	K3III	34 G. Cir
HD 141585			141585	77817	15^{h} 53^{m} 22.94^{s}	−62° 36′ 23.6″	6.22	−0.19	623	K3III	suspected variable, V_{max} = 6.18^{m}, V_{min} = 6.21^{m}
HD 150097			150097	81823	16^{h} 42^{m} 48.42^{s}	−62° 33′ 14.1″	6.23	−2.04	1468	K3III	
HD 143238			143238	78603	16^{h} 02^{m} 52.53^{s}	−62° 32′ 29.5″	6.25	1.17	339	B9.5V	
HD 135737			135737	75091	15^{h} 20^{m} 40.56^{s}	−67° 28′ 53.4″	6.27	−1.66	1254	B3V	suspected variable
HD 151404			151404	82539	16^{h} 52^{m} 17.78^{s}	−67° 40′ 53.4″	6.33	1.01	377	K2III	
R TrA		R	135592	75018	15^{h} 19^{m} 45.71^{s}	−66° 29′ 45.7″	6.39		3500	F7Ib/II	Cepheid variable, V_{max} = 6.33^{m}, V_{min} = 7^{m}, P = 3.389287 d
S TrA		S	142941	78476	16^{h} 01^{m} 10.72^{s}	−63° 46′ 35.5″	6.42	−2.57	2050	F8II	Cepheid variable, V_{max} = 5.95^{m}, V_{min} = 6.81^{m}, P = 6.32344 d
HD 138965			138965	76736	15^{h} 40^{m} 11.63^{s}	−70° 13′ 39.9″	6.45	2.01	252	A5V	
HD 153389			153389	83556	17^{h} 04^{m} 33.70^{s}	−68° 16′ 43.1″	6.47	−1.46	1254	M3/M4III	suspected irregular variable
HD 144481			144481	79208	16^{h} 09^{m} 59.19^{s}	−62° 58′ 01.2″	6.50	1.41	340	A3m...	
U TrA		U	143999	78978	16^{h} 07^{m} 09.01^{s}	−62° 54′ 38.0″	7.89		3130	F8Ib/II	Cepheid variable, V_{max} = 7.3^{m}, V_{min} = 8.29^{m}, P = 2.568423 d
HD 147018			147018	80250	16^{h} 23^{m} 00.15^{s}	−61° 41′ 19.5″	8.37	5.22	139	G9V	has two planets (b & c)
RT TrA		RT		81157	16^{h} 34^{m} 30.89^{s}	−63° 08′ 00.8″	9.70		2590	G2Ib-II:	W Virginis variable, V_{max} = 9.43^{m}, V_{min} = 10.18^{m}, P = 1.9461124 d
WR 71		LT	143414	78689	16^{h} 03^{m} 49.34^{s}	−62° 41′ 36.0″	10.10		2940	WN6w	Wolf–Rayet star, ΔV = 0.13^{m}
EK TrA		EK			15^{h} 14^{m} 01.47^{s}	−65° 05′ 32.1″	10.40				SU Ursae Majoris variable, V_{max} = 10.4^{m}, V_{min} = <15.0^{m}, P = 0.06288 d
HD 141969		MM	141969	78034	15^{h} 56^{m} 01.69^{s}	−66° 09′ 09.2″	11.00		3500	BC0Ibe	central star of planetary nebula He 2-138
KX TrA		KX			16^{h} 44^{m} 35.47^{s}	−62° 37′ 14.08″	11.38			M6	Z Andromedae variable
4U 1626-67		KZ			16^{h} 32^{m} 16.8^{s}	−67° 27′ 43″	18.50				Low-mass X-ray binary, V_{max} = 18.23^{m}, V_{min} = 19^{m}
X1556-605		LU			16^{h} 01^{m} 02.3^{s}	−60° 44′ 18″	18.60				Low-mass X-ray binary, V_{max} = 18.6^{m}, V_{min} = 19.2^{m}, P = 0.46229 d
TrA X-1		KY			15^{h} 28^{m} 17.2^{s}	−61° 52′ 58″					Low-mass X-ray binary
WISE 1639-6847					16^{h} 39^{m} 40.83^{s}	−68° 47′ 38.6″			16	Y	brown dwarf
Table legend: • Name = Proper name • B = Bayer designation • F or/and G. = Flamsteed designation or Gould designation • Var = Variable star designation • HD = Henry Draper Catalogue designation number • HIP = Hipparcos Catalogue designation number • RA = Right ascension for the Epoch/Equinox J2000.0 • Dec = Declination for the Epoch/Equinox J2000.0 • vis. mag. = visual magnitude (m or m_{v}), also known as apparent magnitude • abs. mag. = absolute magnitude (M_{v}) • Dist. (ly) = Distance in light-years from Earth • Sp. class = Spectral class of the star in the stellar classification system • Notes = Common name(s) or alternate name(s); comments; notable properties [for example: multiple star status, range of variability if it is a variable star, exoplanets, etc.]

== See also ==
- List of stars by constellation
