= Triangulum Australe in Chinese astronomy =

The modern constellation Triangulum Australe is not included in the Three Enclosures and Twenty-Eight Mansions system of traditional Chinese uranography because its stars are too far south for observers in China to know about them prior to the introduction of Western star charts. Based on the work of Xu Guangqi and the German Jesuit missionary Johann Adam Schall von Bell in the late Ming Dynasty, this constellation has been classified as one of the 23 Southern Asterisms (近南極星區, Jìnnánjíxīngōu) under the name Triangle (三角形, Sānjiǎoxíng).

Atria (Alpha Trianguli Australis) is the brightest star in this constellation. It is never seen in the Chinese sky

The name of the western constellation in modern Chinese is 南三角座 (nán sān jiǎo zuò), meaning "the southern triangle constellation".

== Stars ==
The map of Chinese constellation in constellation Triangulum Australe area consists of :

Four Symbols	Mansion (Chinese name)	Romanization	Translation	Asterisms (Chinese name)	Romanization	Translation	Western star name	Proper Name	Chinese star name	Romanization	Translation
-	近南極星區 (non-mansions)	Jìnnánjíxīngōu (non-mansions)	The Southern Asterisms (non-mansions)	三角形	Sānjiǎoxíng	Triangle					
-	近南極星區 (non-mansions)	Jìnnánjíxīngōu (non-mansions)	The Southern Asterisms (non-mansions)	三角形	Sānjiǎoxíng	Triangle	γ TrA		三角形一	Sānjiǎoxíngyī	1st star
-	近南極星區 (non-mansions)	Jìnnánjíxīngōu (non-mansions)	The Southern Asterisms (non-mansions)	三角形	Sānjiǎoxíng	Triangle	β TrA		三角形二	Sānjiǎoxíngèr	2nd star
-	近南極星區 (non-mansions)	Jìnnánjíxīngōu (non-mansions)	The Southern Asterisms (non-mansions)	三角形	Sānjiǎoxíng	Triangle	α TrA	Atria	三角形三	Sānjiǎoxíngsān	3rd star
-	近南極星區 (non-mansions)	Jìnnánjíxīngōu (non-mansions)	The Southern Asterisms (non-mansions)	三角形	Sānjiǎoxíng	Triangle	δ TrA		三角形增一	Sānjiǎoxíngzēngyī	1st additional star
-	近南極星區 (non-mansions)	Jìnnánjíxīngōu (non-mansions)	The Southern Asterisms (non-mansions)	三角形	Sānjiǎoxíng	Triangle	ε TrA		三角形增二	Sānjiǎoxíngzēngèr	2nd additional star

== See also ==
- Chinese astronomy
- Traditional Chinese star names
- Chinese constellations
