= HD 171238 =

Star in the constellation Sagittarius

Observation data Epoch J2000.0 Equinox ICRS
- Constellation: Sagittarius
- Right ascension: 18^{h} 34^{m} 43.676^{s}
- Declination: −28° 04′ 20.33″
- Apparent magnitude (V): 8.606

Characteristics
- Evolutionary stage: main sequence
- Spectral type: G8 V
- Apparent magnitude (B): 9.40
- Apparent magnitude (J): 7.244
- Apparent magnitude (H): 6.868
- Apparent magnitude (K): 6.831
- B−V color index: 0.74

Astrometry
Radial velocity (R_{v})	21.11±0.17 km/s
Proper motion (μ)	RA: −29.539 mas/yr Dec.: −109.580 mas/yr
Parallax (π)	22.4809±0.0324 mas
Distance	145.1 ± 0.2 ly (44.48 ± 0.06 pc)
Absolute magnitude (M_{V})	5.15

Details
Mass	0.99±0.01 M_{☉}
Radius	0.95±0.01 R_{☉}
Luminosity	0.774±0.003 L_{☉}
Surface gravity (log g)	4.47±0.01 cgs
Temperature	5,570±21 K
Metallicity [Fe/H]	0.17±0.007 dex
Rotational velocity (v sin i)	1.48 km/s
Age	4.0±1.2 Gyr

Other designations
- CD−28°14719, HD 171238, HIP 91085, SAO 186998, PPM 268605

Database references
SIMBAD	data
Exoplanet Archive	data

HD 171238 is a star with an orbiting exoplanet in the southern constellation of Sagittarius. It is located at a distance of 145 light years from the Sun based on parallax measurements, and is drifting further away with a radial velocity of 21 km/s. The star has an absolute magnitude of 5.15, but at the distance of this system it is too faint to be viewed with the naked eye, having an apparent visual magnitude of 8.61.

The spectrum of HD 171238 presents as an ordinary G-type main-sequence star with a stellar classification of G8 V. At an estimated age of around four billion years, it is spinning with a projected rotational velocity of 1.5 km/s. The metallicity of the star – the abundance of elements more massive than helium – is 48% higher than solar, based on the abundance of iron. There are indications of a significant level of magnetic activity in the chromosphere. The star has 99% of the mass of the Sun and 95% of the Sun's girth. It is radiating just 77% of the luminosity of the Sun from its photosphere at an effective temperature of 5,570 K.

== Planetary system ==
In August 2009, it was announced that this star has a super-jovian exoplanet. Using astrometry from Gaia, astronomers were able to deduce the true mass of HD 171238 b as 8.8 M_{J}; higher than the minimum mass estimated from Doppler spectroscopy.

The HD 171238 planetary system
Companion (in order from star)	Mass	Semimajor axis (AU)	Orbital period (years)	Eccentricity	Inclination (°)	Radius
b	8.8+3.6 −1.3 M_{J}	2.518+0.032 −0.033	4.148+0.045 −0.046	0.358+0.028 −0.026	19.1+7.9 −8.5	—

== See also ==
- HD 147018
- HD 204313
- List of extrasolar planets
