= HD 171238 b =

Exoplanet orbiting HD 171238 in the constellation Sagittarius

Discovery
- Discovered by: Segransan et al.
- Discovery site: La Silla Observatory
- Discovery date: August 11, 2009
- Detection method: Radial velocity (CORALIE)

Orbital characteristics
- Semi-major axis: 2.518+0.032 −0.033 AU
- Eccentricity: 0.234±0.028
- Orbital period (sidereal): 4.148+0.045 −0.046 yr
- Inclination: 19.1+7.9 −8.5 or 162.9+5.0 −3.1
- Longitude of ascending node: 71+47 −13
- Time of periastron: 2455905±20
- Argument of periastron: 46.9+3.9 −3.7
- Semi-amplitude: 50.7±2.6
- Star: HD 171238

Physical characteristics
- Mass: 8.8+3.6 −1.3 M_{J}

HD 171238 b is an extrasolar planet which orbits the G-type main sequence star HD 171238, located approximately 164 light years away in the constellation Sagittarius. This planet has minimum mass two and a half times greater than Jupiter and orbits two times closer to the star than Jupiter to the Sun. However this planet orbits in an eccentric orbit, about two astronomical units difference between periastron and apastron distances. This planet was discovered in August 2009 by using the radial velocity method in La Silla Observatory, Chile.

Astrometry of HD 171238 has determined an orbital inclination of either 19.1° or 162.9°, depending on whether the solution is prograde or retrograde. This, combined with the minimum mass, gives a true mass of 8.8 M_{J}.
