= HD 133683 =

Yellow-white hued star in the constellation Triangulum Australe

- Location of HD 133683 (circled in red)

Observation data Epoch J2000 Equinox J2000
- Constellation: Triangulum Australe
- Right ascension: 15^{h} 09^{m} 29.91331^{s}
- Declination: −67° 05′ 02.8878″
- Apparent magnitude (V): +5.76

Characteristics
- Spectral type: F5Ib
- B−V color index: 0.675±0.017

Astrometry
Radial velocity (R_{v})	−14.72±0.14 km/s
Proper motion (μ)	RA: −3.146 mas/yr Dec.: −3.314 mas/yr
Parallax (π)	0.9159±0.0583 mas
Distance	3,600 ± 200 ly (1,090 ± 70 pc)
Absolute magnitude (M_{V})	−5.33

Details
Mass	11.59±1.12 M_{☉}
Radius	79.3+1.9 −6.2 R_{☉}
Luminosity	5,436±458 L_{☉}
Surface gravity (log g)	1.70 cgs
Temperature	5,567+231 −64 K
Metallicity [Fe/H]	0.00 dex
Rotational velocity (v sin i)	4.7±0.2 km/s

Other designations
- CD−66°1703, FK5 3195, HD 133683, HIP 74184, HR 5621, SAO 253031

Database references
SIMBAD	data

HD 133683 is a single star in the southern constellation of Triangulum Australe. It has a yellow-white hue and is dimly visible to the naked eye with an apparent visual magnitude of +5.76. The distance to this star is approximately 3,600 light-years based on parallax, but it is drifting closer with a radial velocity of −14.7 km/s.

This is a massive supergiant star with a stellar classification of F5Ib. It has around 11 times the mass of the Sun and is spinning with a projected rotational velocity of 4.7 km/s. The star has expanded to 79 times the radius of the Sun. It is radiating 5,400 times the luminosity of the Sun from its photosphere at an effective temperature of 5,567 K.
