= V553 Centauri =

Star in the constellation Centaurus

Observation data Epoch J2000.0 Equinox J2000.0
- Constellation: Centaurus
- Right ascension: 14^{h} 46^{m} 33.636^{s}
- Declination: −32° 10′ 15.27″
- Apparent magnitude (V): 8.22 to 8.80

Characteristics
- Spectral type: G5p I–III
- B−V color index: 0.600±0.020
- Variable type: BL Her

Astrometry
Radial velocity (R_{v})	−4.95±3.95 km/s
Proper motion (μ)	RA: 4.145 mas/yr Dec.: −1.914 mas/yr
Parallax (π)	1.7286±0.0224 mas
Distance	1,890 ± 20 ly (579 ± 7 pc)

Details
Mass	0.49 M_{☉}
Radius	9.9 R_{☉}
Surface gravity (log g)	2.2 cgs
Temperature	6,060 K
Metallicity [Fe/H]	0.01 dex

Other designations
- V553 Cen, CD−31° 11449, HD 129981, HIP 72257, SAO 205930, PPM 293050

Database references
SIMBAD	data

V553 Centauri is a variable star in the southern constellation of Centaurus, abbreviated V553 Cen. It ranges in brightness from an apparent visual magnitude of 8.22 down to 8.80 with a period of 2.06 days. At that magnitude, it is too dim to be visible to the naked eye. Based on parallax measurements, it is located at a distance of approximately 1,890 light years from the Sun.

== Observations ==
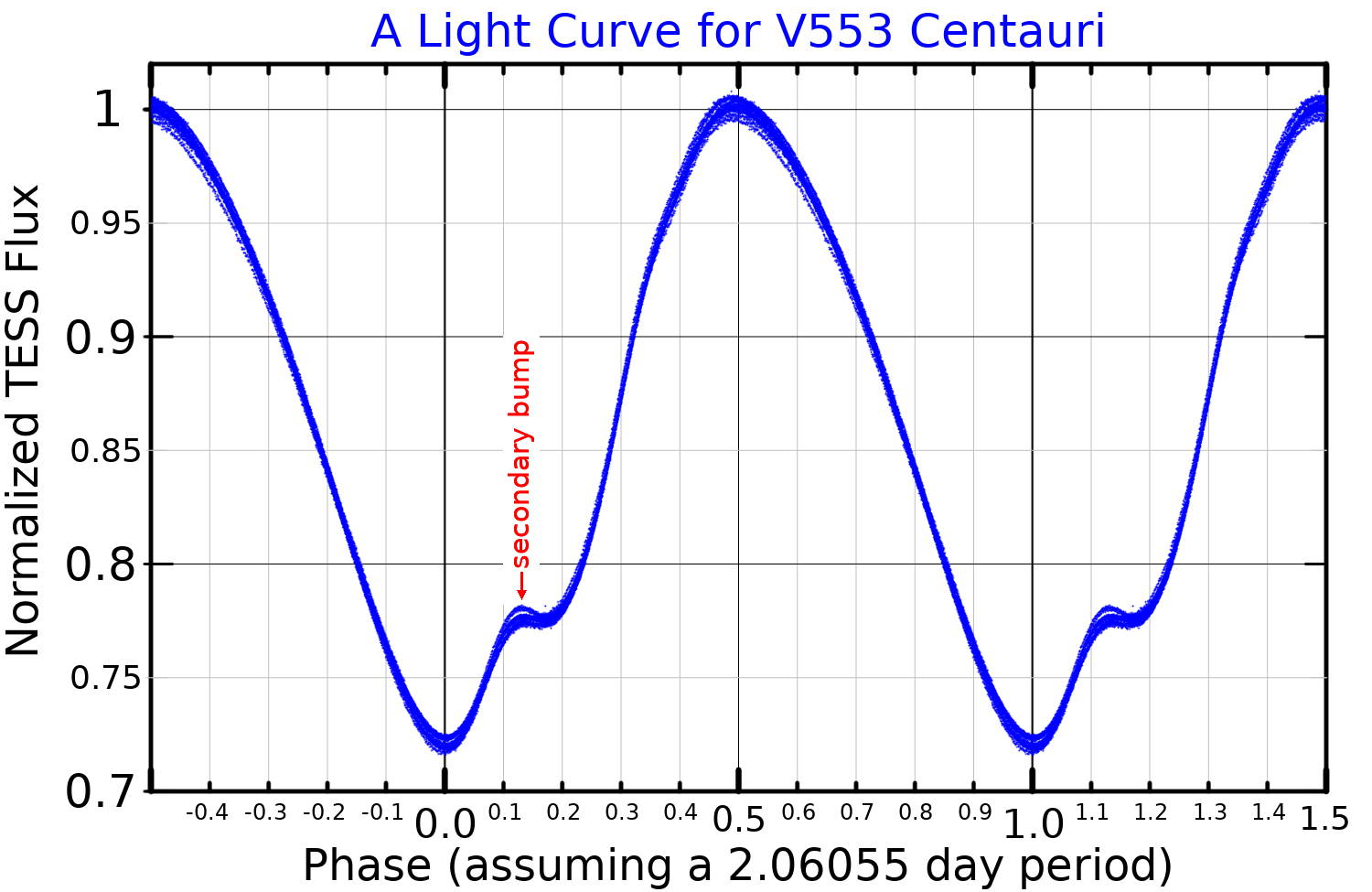
A light curve for V553 Centauri, plotted from TESS data

The variability of this star was announced in 1936 by C. Hoffmeister. In 1957, he determined it to be a Delta Cepheid variable with a magnitude range of 8.3 to 8.6 and a periodicity of 2.06119 d. The observers M. W. Feast and G. H. Herbig noted a peculiar spectrum with strong absorption lines of the molecules CH and CN, while neutral iron lines are unusually weak. They found a stellar classification of G5p I–III.

In 1972, T. Lloyd-Evans and associates found the star's prominent bands of C_{2}, CH, and CN varied with the Cepheid phase, being strongest at minimum. They suggested a large overabundance of carbon in the star's atmosphere. Chemical analysis of the atmosphere in 1979 showed a metallicity close to solar, with an enhancement of carbon and nitrogen. It was proposed that V553 Cen is an evolved RR Lyrae variable and is now positioned above the horizontal branch on the HR diagram. V553 Cen is classified as a BL Herculis variable, being a low–mass type II Cepheid with a period between 1 and 6 d. As with other variables of this type, it displays a secondary bump on its light curve. It is a member of a small group of carbon Cepheids, and is one of the brightest stars of that type.

V553 Cen does not appear to have a companion. From the luminosity and shape of the light curve, stellar models from 1981 suggest a mass equal to 49% of the Sun's with 9.9 times the radius of the Sun. Further analysis of the spectrum showed that oxygen is not enhanced, but sodium may be moderately enhanced. There is no evidence of s-process enhancement of elements. Instead, the abundance peculiarities are the result of nuclear reaction sequences followed by dredge-up. In particular, these are the product of triple-α, CN, ON, and perhaps some Ne–Na reactions.

== See also ==
- Carbon star
- RT Trianguli Australis
