= VY Pyxidis =

Star in the constellation Pyxis

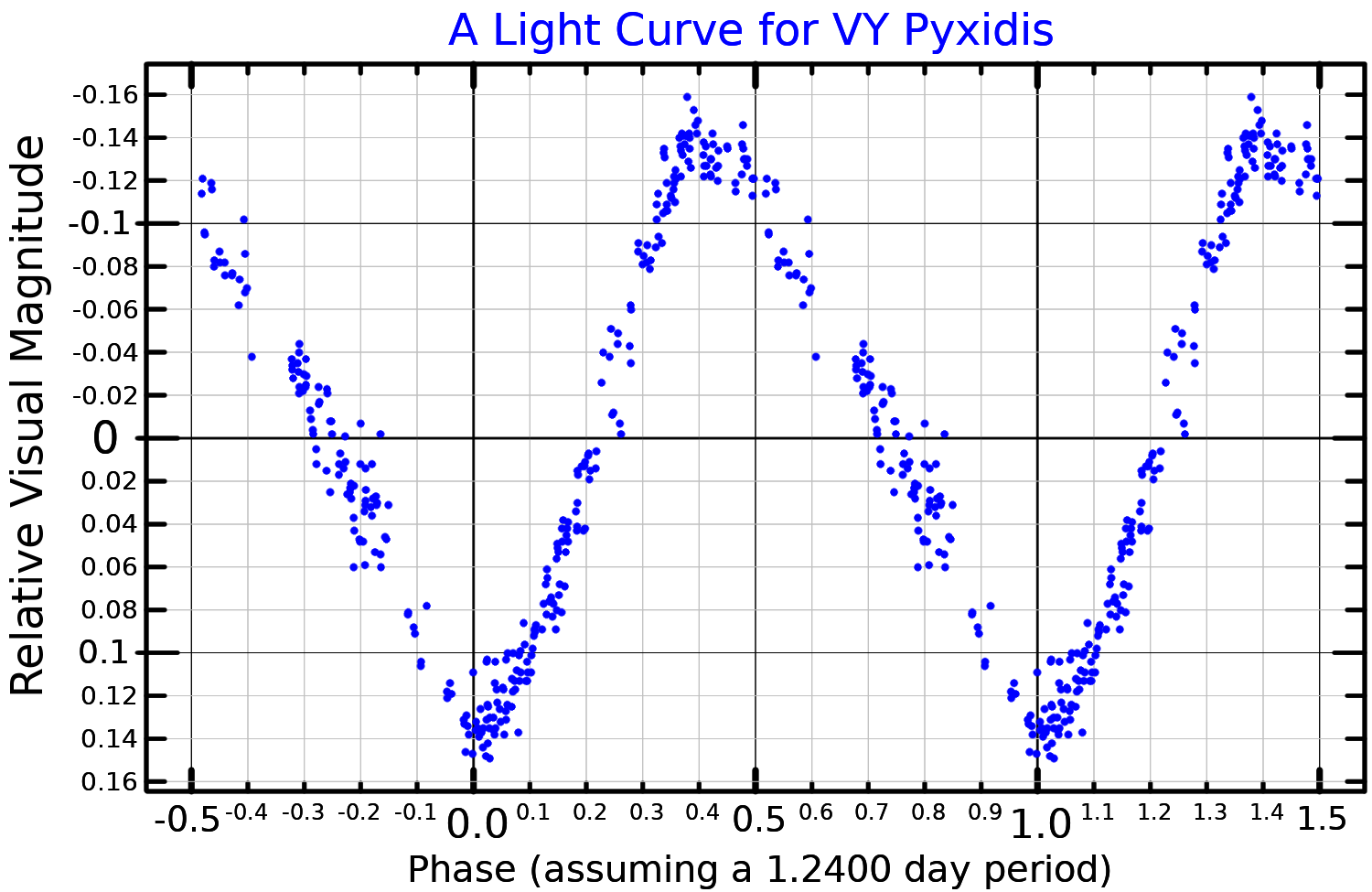
- A visual band light curve for VY Pyxidis, plotted from data published by Sanwal and Sarma (1991)

Observation data Epoch J2000.0 Equinox J2000.0 (ICRS)
- Constellation: Pyxis
- Right ascension: 08^{h} 54^{m} 29.6305^{s}
- Declination: −23° 31′ 18.575″
- Apparent magnitude (V): 7.13 - 7.40

Characteristics
- Spectral type: F3/5III
- Variable type: BL Her

Astrometry
Proper motion (μ)	RA: 11.081 mas/yr Dec.: 29.509 mas/yr
Parallax (π)	3.9495±0.0186 mas
Distance	826 ± 4 ly (253 ± 1 pc)

Details
Mass	2.4 M_{☉}
Radius	6.5 R_{☉}
Luminosity	46 L_{☉}
Surface gravity (log g)	2.987 cgs
Temperature	6,133 K
Metallicity [Fe/H]	−0.101 dex

Other designations
- VY Pyx, BD−22° 2440, HD 76296, HIP 43736, SAO 176679

Database references
SIMBAD	data

VY Pyxidis is a BL Herculis variable (type II Cepheid) in the constellation of Pyxis. It ranges between apparent magnitudes 7.13 and 7.40 over a period of 1.23995 days. Located around 826 light-years distant, it shines with a luminosity approximately 46 times that of the Sun and has a surface temperature of 6,133 K
