= NGC 5979 =

Planetary nebula in the constellation Triangulum Australe

Emission nebula
- Planetary nebula
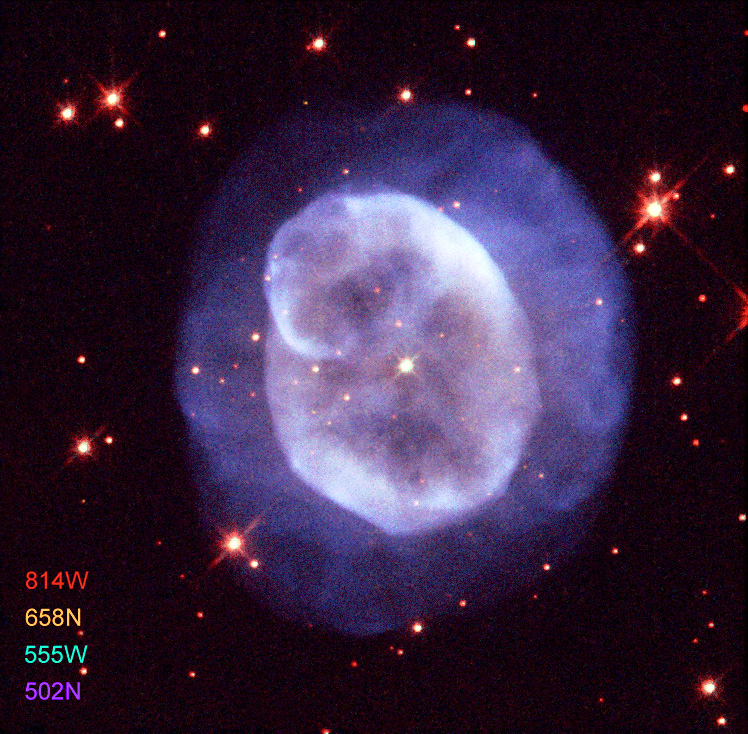
- NGC 5979 by Hubble Space Telescope

Observation data: J2000 epoch
- Right ascension: 15^{h} 47^{m} 41^{s}
- Declination: −61° 13′ 05″
- Apparent magnitude (V): 12.10
- Constellation: Triangulum Australe

Physical characteristics
- Radius: 0.51 ly
- Designations: NGC 5979, ESO 136-3, 2MASX J15474191-6113079

NGC 5979 is a planetary nebula in the constellation Triangulum Australe. It was discovered by John Herschel on April 24, 1835. The central star of the planetary nebula is an O-type star with a spectral type of O(H)3-4.

== Gallery ==
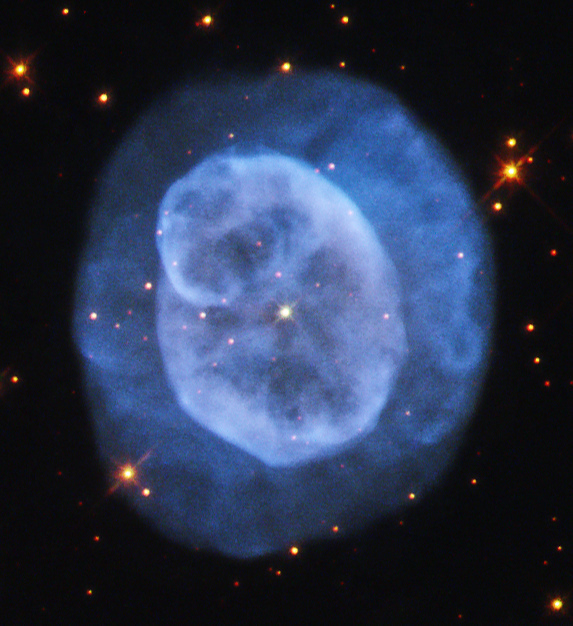
NGC 5979 by Judy Schmidt
