= NGC 6025 =

Open cluster in the constellation Triangulum Australe

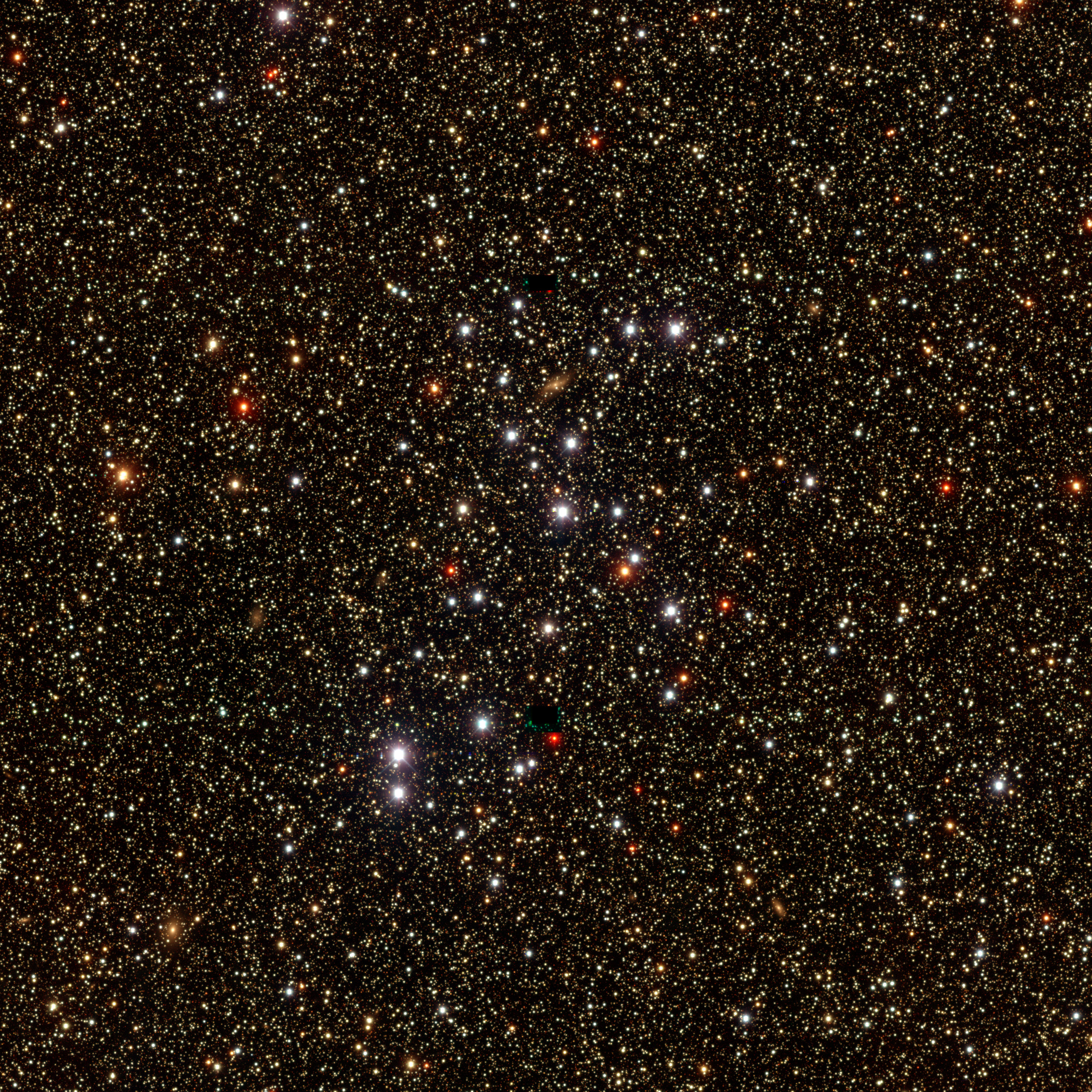
- NGC 6025 and the surrounding star field Credit: DECaPS

Observation data (J2000 epoch)
- Right ascension: 16^{h} 03^{m} 07.0^{s}
- Declination: −60° 25′ 48″
- Distance: 2,410 ly (739.0 pc)
- Apparent magnitude (V): 5.1
- Apparent dimensions (V): 15′

Physical characteristics
- Estimated age: 40 to 69 Myr
- Other designations: Caldwell 95, Collinder 296, Melotte 139, Lacaille III.10, Dunlop 304

Associations
- Constellation: Triangulum Australe

NGC 6025 is an open cluster of stars in the southern constellation of Triangulum Australe, near the northern constellation border with Norma. It was discovered by Abbe Lacaille in 1751 during his expedition to the Cape of Good Hope. The cluster is in the Caldwell catalogue as entry number 95, and is located at a mean distance of 2,410 ly from the Sun. NGC 6025 can be spotted with the naked eye, but is better viewed with a set of large binoculars. It has an apparent visual magnitude of 5.1 and spans an angular size of 15′.

The Trumpler class of this cluster is II3p, indicating, "a detached cluster with but little central condensation, composed of moderately bright and faint stars numbering less than 50." The brightest cluster member is MQ Triangulum Australis, with a magnitude of 7.1. This is a blue straggler with a stellar classification of B1Ve. NGC 6025 is a moderately young cluster with an age between 40 and 69 Myr. The cluster is metal-rich compared to the Sun; more so than the Hyades cluster. Seven spectroscopic binary star systems have been identified. Only one blue straggler has been found among the members, along with two Be candidates.

NGC 6025 straddles the IAU boundary between the constellations Norma and Triangulum Australe, as determined by Delporte. The northern part of the open cluster in Norma, the southern part in Triangulum Australe.
