= Theta Trianguli Australis =

Star in the constellation Triangulum Australe

θ Trianguli Australis
- Location of θ Trianguli Australis (circled)

Observation data Epoch J2000.0 Equinox J2000.0 (ICRS)
- Constellation: Triangulum Australe
- Right ascension: 16^{h} 35^{m} 44.82105^{s}
- Declination: −65° 29′ 43.4386″
- Apparent magnitude (V): +5.50

Characteristics
- Evolutionary stage: red giant branch
- Spectral type: G8-K0 III
- U−B color index: +0.73
- B−V color index: +0.93

Astrometry
Radial velocity (R_{v})	11.14±0.12 km/s
Proper motion (μ)	RA: +45.577 mas/yr Dec.: +34.381 mas/yr
Parallax (π)	9.4515±0.1434 mas
Distance	345 ± 5 ly (106 ± 2 pc)
Absolute magnitude (M_{V})	+0.46

Details
Mass	2.65±0.1 M_{☉}
Radius	10.4±0.2 R_{☉}
Luminosity	64.6±1.5 L_{☉}
Surface gravity (log g)	2.81±0.056 cgs
Temperature	5,071±30 K
Metallicity [Fe/H]	0.01±0.026 dex

Other designations
- θ TrA, CPD−65°3331, FK5 3312, HD 148890, HIP 81252, HR 6151, SAO 253614

Database references
SIMBAD	data

θ Trianguli Australis, Latinized as Theta Trianguli Australis, is a single star in the southern constellation of Triangulum Australe. It is visible to the naked eye as a dim, yellow-hued star with an apparent visual magnitude of +5.50. The star is located about 345 light years from the Sun based on parallax, and is drifting further away with a radial velocity of +11 km/s.

This is an evolved G/K-type giant star with a stellar classification of G8-K0 III. This star is 2.6 times more massive than the Sun, but has expanded to ten times the radius of the Sun. It is radiating 65 times the Sun's luminosity from its photosphere at an effective temperature of 5,071 K.
