= XX Virginis =

Variable star in the constellation Virgo

Observation data Epoch J2000.0 Equinox J2000.0
- Constellation: Virgo
- Right ascension: 14^{h} 16^{m} 48.593^{s}
- Declination: −06° 17′ 15.06″
- Apparent magnitude (V): 11.55 to 12.78

Characteristics
- Spectral type: kA7hF6
- Variable type: Anomalous Cepheid

Astrometry
Radial velocity (R_{v})	−55.0 km/s
Proper motion (μ)	RA: −11.421 mas/yr Dec.: −10.826 mas/yr
Parallax (π)	0.144±0.0194 mas
Distance	9,360 ± 1,100 ly (2,869±337 pc)
Absolute magnitude (M_{V})	−0.74

Details
Mass	0.6 M_{☉}
Radius	13±7 R_{☉}
Luminosity	156 L_{☉}
Surface gravity (log g)	1.95 (avg) cgs
Temperature	6,410 K (6,030 to 7,610)‍ K
Metallicity [Fe/H]	−1.57 dex
Age	293 Myr

Other designations
- XX Vir, TIC 6030027, GCRV 8351

Database references
SIMBAD	data

XX Virginis is a variable star in the equatorial constellation of Virgo, abbreviated XX Vir. It ranges in apparent visual magnitude from 11.55 to 12.78, which is much too faint to be visible to the naked eye. The star is located at an estimated distance of roughly 9,400 light-years (2,900 pc).

This is classified as a type II Cepheid of the BL Her type, having a short pulsation period of 1.348 days. However, a 2014 survey has it classified as an anomalous Cepheid of the BL Boo type. The light curve is asymmetrical, resembling that of a type ab RR Lyrae variable. On the HR diagram it is positioned above the horizontal branch. For this reason, it is sometimes used as the prototype of, "Above Horizontal Branch variables of subtype 1."

This is a very metal-poor star with an estimated 0.6 times the mass of the Sun. The effective temperature and radius vary depending on the phase of the pulsation cycle.
