= RT Trianguli Australis =

Star in the constellation Triangulum Australe

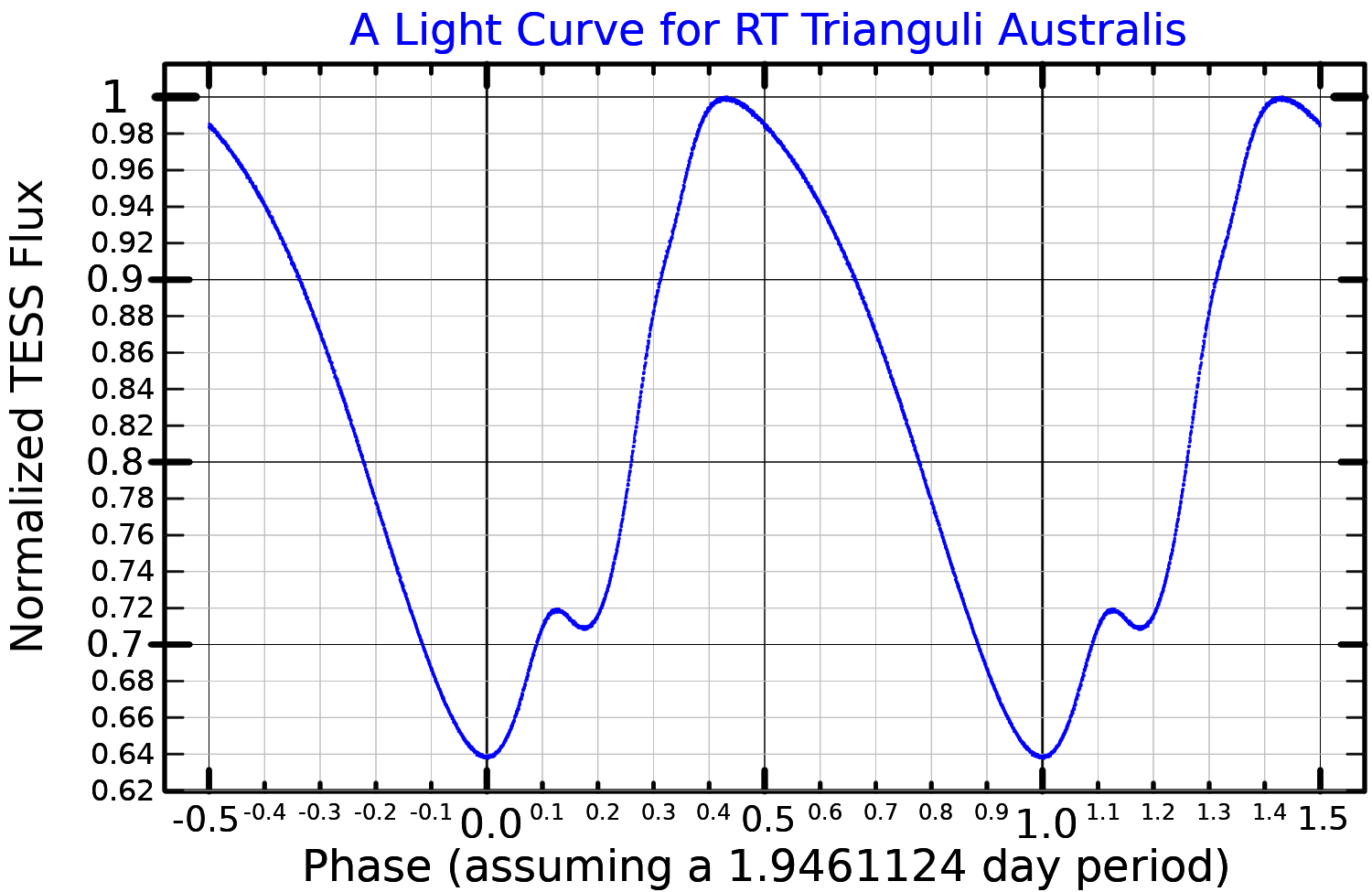
- A light curve for RT Trianguli Australis, plotted from TESS data

Observation data Epoch J2000.0 Equinox J2000.0 (ICRS)
- Constellation: Triangulum Australe
- Right ascension: 16^{h} 34^{m} 30.89200^{s}
- Declination: −63° 08′ 00.8146″
- Apparent magnitude (V): 9.43 - 10.18

Characteristics
- Spectral type: F8:(R)-G2I-II
- Variable type: BL Her

Astrometry
Proper motion (μ)	RA: −3.693 mas/yr Dec.: −11.541 mas/yr
Parallax (π)	1.0162±0.0162 mas
Distance	3,210 ± 50 ly (980 ± 20 pc)

Details
Mass	0.48 M_{☉}
Radius	9.4 R_{☉}
Metallicity [Fe/H]	+0.4 dex

Minimum
Luminosity	138 L_{☉}
Temperature	5,200 K

Maximum
Luminosity	200 L_{☉}
Temperature	6,500 K

Other designations
- RT TrA, CPD−62° 5377, HIP 81157, 2MASS J16343089-6308009, AAVSO 1625-62

Database references
SIMBAD	data

RT Trianguli Australis, or RT TrA, is a BL Herculis variable (type II Cepheid) in the constellation of Triangulum Australe.

== Variable ==
RT TrA varies between apparent magnitudes 9.4 and 10.2 over a period of 1.95 days. It was first discovered to be variable by Annie Jump Cannon in 1910 and initially classified as an RR Lyrae variable. Later authors segregated it and the similar V553 Centauri as RW Aurigae stars. In time it became clear that RT TrA was unrelated to RW Aur, instead being a member of a group of stars on the instability strip somewhat above the horizontal branch. These stars were then named as a group after BL Herculis, the brightest known member. BL Her stars have periods shorter than eight days. Like other BL Her variables, the light curve of RT TrA has a hump, in this case on the descending branch. The light curve is slightly asymmetric, with the minimum occurring at phase 0.6.

== Properties ==
RT TrA is a cool giant star with a radius of 9.4 R_{☉}, although its spectral luminosity class verges on the supergiant level at times during its pulsations. As it pulsates, the effective temperature varies between 5,200 and 6,500 K and its luminosity between 138 and 200 L_{☉}. Its physical properties place it on the instability strip of the H–R diagram.

== Carbon star ==
RT TrA is unusual in that it is a carbon-rich cepheid variable. Unlike true carbon stars, it does not show an excess of s-process elements. It has very high surface abundances of carbon, nitrogen, iron, and some light metals, but not oxygen. The unusual abundances are believed to result from the convection of triple-alpha fusion products to the surface, and so it is expected that there will also be a high proportion of helium. Most other BL Her stars do not show the same surface carbon excess. The elemental abundances are comparable to the cooler type-R stars.
