= BL Herculis variable =

Type of variable star

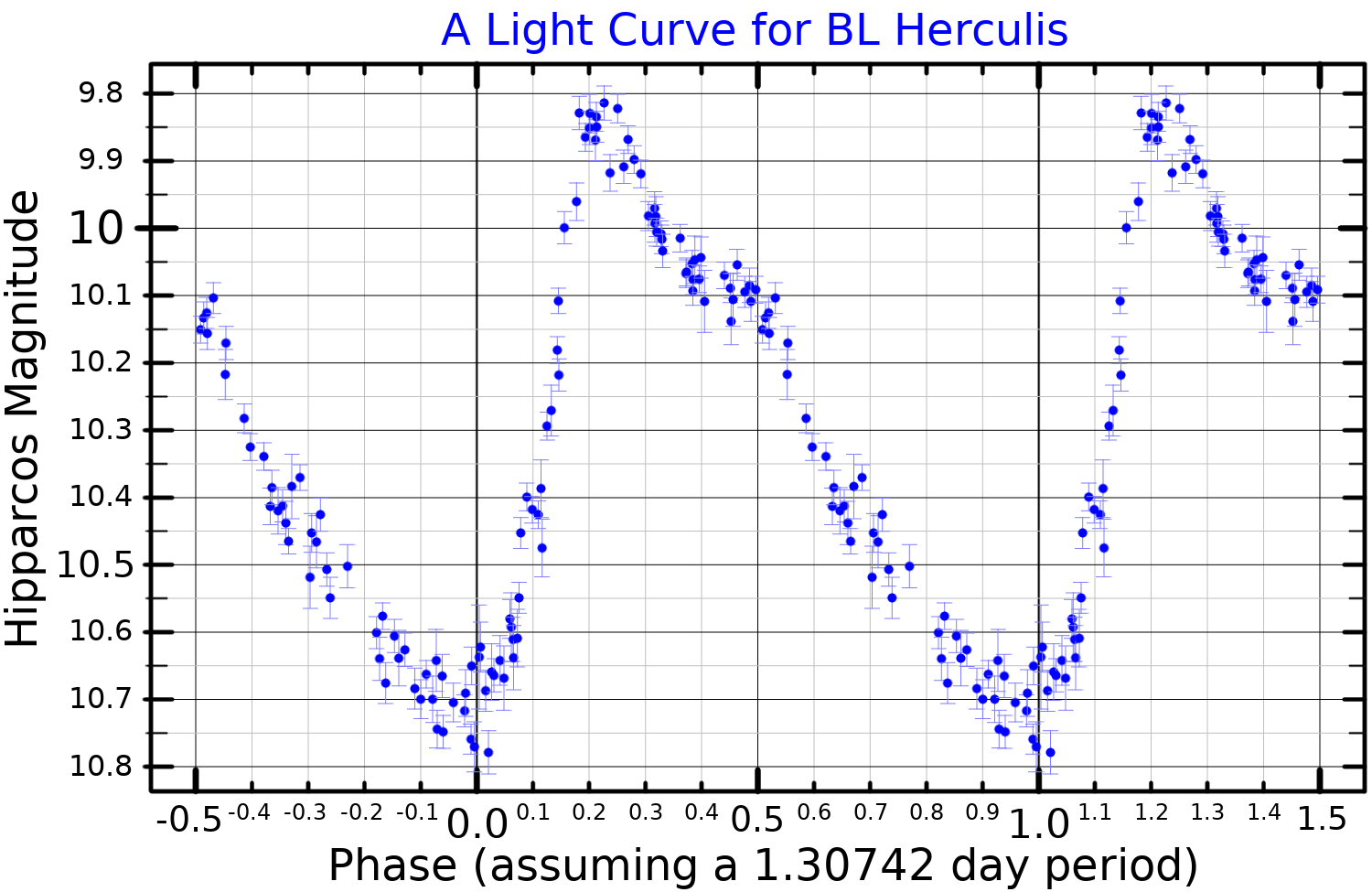
A light curve for BL Herculis, plotted from Hipparcos data

BL Herculis variables are a subclass of type II Cepheids with low luminosity and mass, that have a period of less than eight days. They are pulsating stars with light curves that frequently show a bump on the descending side for stars of the shortest periods and on the ascending side for longer period stars. Like other type II Cepheids, they are very old population II stars found in the galaxy’s halo and globular clusters. Also, compared to other type II Cepheids, BL Herculis variables have shorter periods and are fainter than W Virginis variables. Pulsating stars vary in spectral class as they vary in brightness and BL Herculis variables are normally class A at their brightest and class F when most dim. When plotted on the Hertzsprung–Russell diagram they fall in-between W Virginis and RR Lyrae variables.

The prototype star, BL Herculis, varies between magnitude 9.7 and 10.6 in a period of 1.3 days. The brightest BL Herculis variables, with their maximum magnitudes, are:

- VY Pyxidis, 7.7
- V553 Centauri, 8.2
- SW Tauri, 9.3
- RT Trianguli Australis, 9.4
- V351 Cephei, 9.5
- BL Herculis. 9.7
- BD Cassiopeiae, 10.8
- UY Eridani, 10.9

The BL Herculis stars show a wide variety of light curves, temperatures, and luminosity, and three subdivisions of the class have been defined, with the acronym AHB referring to above horizontal branch:

- XX Virginis stars (AHB1), with very fast rises to maximum and low metallicity
- CW stars (AHB2), W Virginis variables, longer periods, the bump on the ascending leg
- BL Herculis stars (AHB3), shorter periods, the bump on the descending leg
