= Gamma Trianguli Australis =

Star in the constellation Triangulum Australe

- Location of γ Trianguli Australis (circled)

Observation data Epoch J2000.0 Equinox ICRS
- Constellation: Triangulum Australe
- Right ascension: 15^{h} 18^{m} 54.58129^{s}
- Declination: −68° 40′ 46.3680″
- Apparent magnitude (V): +2.87

Characteristics
- Evolutionary stage: Subgiant
- Spectral type: A1III
- U−B color index: −0.02
- B−V color index: +0.00

Astrometry
Radial velocity (R_{v})	−3.0 km/s
Proper motion (μ)	RA: −65.816 mas/yr Dec.: −31.187 mas/yr
Parallax (π)	17.1809±0.3327 mas
Distance	190 ± 4 ly (58 ± 1 pc)
Absolute magnitude (M_{V})	−0.89

Details
Mass	3.04 M_{☉}
Radius	6.5 or 7 R_{☉}
Luminosity	249 L_{☉}
Surface gravity (log g)	3.39 cgs
Temperature	8,225 K
Rotational velocity (v sin i)	199 km/s
Age	350 Myr

Other designations
- γ TrA, CD−68°1503, FK5 560, HD 135382, HIP 74946, HR 5671, SAO 253097

Database references
SIMBAD	data

Gamma Trianguli Australis, Latinized from γ Trianguli Australis, is a white-hued star in the southern constellation of Triangulum Australe. Along with Alpha and Beta Trianguli Australis it forms a prominent triangular asterism that gives the constellation its name (Latin for southern triangle). It is the third-brightest member of this constellation with an apparent visual magnitude of +2.87. Based upon parallax measurements, Gamma Trianguli Australis is located at a distance of about 190 light-years (58 parsecs) from Earth.

== Characteristics ==
The spectrum of this star matches a stellar classification of A1 III, which identifies it as a giant star. It could be also a subgiant. An unusual abundance of the element europium demonstrates it to be a peculiar, or Ap star. However, its classification as a chemically peculiar star is doubtful. Most stars of this type are slow rotators, but Gamma Trianguli Australis displays a very high rate of rotation with a projected rotational velocity of 199 km s^{−1}.

At a mass of 3.04 solar masses, Gamma Trianguli Australis was a late B-type star (B8V/B9V) in the main sequence. Being 350 million years old, it has recently begun its expansion towards a red giant. Its radius is either 7 R_{☉} (estimated using stellar isochrones) or 6.5 R_{☉} (measured). The star is emitting a luminosity equivalent to 250 solar luminosities. Its surface has an effective temperature of 8,225 K. This is around 2,450 K hotter than the Sun and gives it a white hue, typical of A-type stars.

This star shows an excess emission of infrared radiation, suggesting that there is a circumstellar disk of dust orbiting this star. The mean temperature of the emission is 50 K, corresponding to a separation from the star of 481 astronomical units.

== Reported companion star ==
The Gaia Data Release 3 (Gaia DR3) reported Gamma Trianguli Australis as an astrometric binary with a period of 488 days (1.34 years). The companion star would be a red dwarf with a mass of 0.26 M_{☉} and a semimajor axis of 1.8 AU. However, a further study using the Very Large Telescope did not find any evidence of a companion, placing constraints on the properties of the putative companion.

== Modern legacy ==
γ TrA appears on the flag of Brazil, symbolising the state of Paraná.
