= Eta Trianguli Australis =

Star in the constellation Triangulum Australe

Observation data Epoch J2000.0 Equinox J2000.0 (ICRS)
- Constellation: Triangulum Australe
- Right ascension: 16^{h} 41^{m} 23.10722^{s}
- Declination: −68° 17′ 46.0412″
- Apparent magnitude (V): +5.91

Characteristics
- Evolutionary stage: main sequence
- Spectral type: B7 V or B7 IVe
- U−B color index: −0.42
- B−V color index: −0.08

Astrometry
Radial velocity (R_{v})	−10.0±7.6 km/s
Proper motion (μ)	RA: −14.067 mas/yr Dec.: −11.535 mas/yr
Parallax (π)	4.2679±0.0842 mas
Distance	760 ± 20 ly (234 ± 5 pc)
Absolute magnitude (M_{V})	−0.36

Details
Mass	3.76±0.12 M_{☉}
Luminosity	318 L_{☉}
Temperature	12,162 K
Rotational velocity (v sin i)	234 km/s
Age	199 Myr

Other designations
- η TrA, CPD−68°2789, GC 22379, HD 149671, HIP 81710, HR 6172, SAO 253649

Database references
SIMBAD	data

Eta Trianguli Australis (η Trianguli Australis) is a solitary, blue-white hued star in the southern constellation Triangulum Australe. It is sometimes given a superscript: η^{1} Trianguli Australis, though it is the only star that is commonly referred to by this Bayer designation. Lacaille named a close by star as Eta as well, which was inconsistently followed by Francis Baily, who used the name for the brighter or both stars in two different publications. Despite their faintness, Gould upheld their Bayer designation as they were closer than 25 degrees to the south celestial pole. The second Eta is now designated as HD 150550.

This star is faintly visible to the naked eye with an apparent visual magnitude of +5.91. Based upon an annual parallax shift of just 4.93 mas as seen from the Earth, it is located roughly 760 light years from the Sun. At that distance, the visual magnitude of the star is diminished by an extinction of 0.28 due to interstellar dust. The system appears to be moving closer to the Sun with a radial velocity of around −10 km/s.

Eta Trianguli Australis is a B-type main-sequence star with a stellar classification of B7 V. Although it has been classified as a B7 IVe Be subgiant star in the past, Jaschek and Jaschek (1992) found no trace of emission in the spectrum. Grady et al. (1989) reported only "weak or narrow double-peaked Hα emission, but no emission at Hβ". The star shows a relatively high peculiar velocity of 40±20 km/s. It is spinning rapidly with a projected rotational velocity of 234 km/s.
