= R Trianguli Australis =

Variable star in the constellation Triangulum Australe

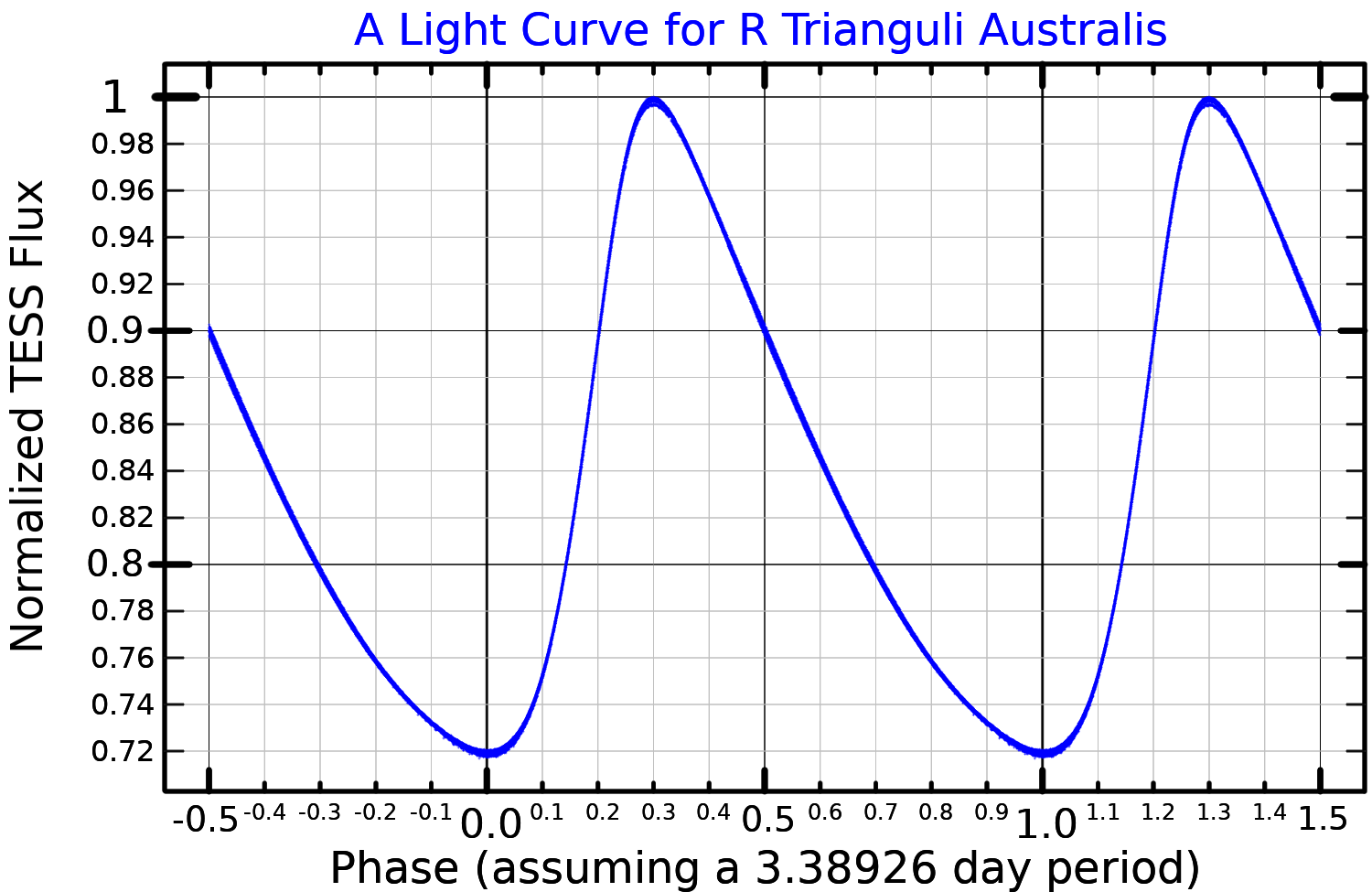
- A light curve for R Trianguli Astralis, plotted from TESS data

Observation data Epoch J2000 Equinox ICRS
- Constellation: Triangulum Australe
- Right ascension: 15^{h} 19^{m} 45.71231^{s}
- Declination: −66° 29′ 45.7417″
- Apparent magnitude (V): 6.33 - 6.90

Characteristics
- Spectral type: F7 Ib/II
- Variable type: δ Cep

Astrometry
Radial velocity (R_{v})	−13.2±1.6 km/s
Proper motion (μ)	RA: −5.113 mas/yr Dec.: −8.317 mas/yr
Parallax (π)	1.4754±0.0371 mas
Distance	2,210 ± 60 ly (680 ± 20 pc)
Absolute magnitude (M_{V})	2.69

Details
Mass	5.42 or 5.66 M_{☉}
Radius	24.7±1.9 or 35.8±0.8 R_{☉}
Surface gravity (log g)	2.10 cgs
Temperature	5,852±21 K
Metallicity [Fe/H]	+0.06±0.08 dex
Rotational velocity (v sin i)	16 km/s

Other designations
- R TrA, CD−66° 1728, HD 135592, HIP 75018, SAO 253107

Database references
SIMBAD	data

R Trianguli Australis is a yellow-white hued variable star in the southern constellation Triangulum Australe. It is near the limit of visibility to the naked eye, having a typical apparent visual magnitude of about six. Based upon an annual parallax shift of 1.48 mas, it is located 2,210 light years away. R TrA is moving closer with a heliocentric radial velocity of −13 km/s.

Benjamin Apthorp Gould discovered that the star's brightness varies, in 1871. This is a Classical Cepheid variable with an apparent magnitude that ranges from 6.33 to 6.90 over 3.38926 days. It is a bright giant/supergiant with a nominal stellar classification of F7 Ib/II, but pulsates between spectral types F5Ib/II-G5. Depending on the method employed, the estimated mass is 5.42 or 5.66 times the mass of the Sun and it has 24.7 or 35.8 times the Sun's radius. R TrA has an infrared excess that is being emitted by circumstellar silicate dust heated to 150–200 K. It is losing mass at the rate of 4×10^{−9} M_{☉}·y^{−1}.
