= HD 147018 c =

Extrasolar planet in the constellation Triangulum Australe

Discovery
- Discovered by: Segransan et al.
- Discovery site: La Silla Observatory
- Discovery date: August 11, 2009
- Detection method: radial velocity (CORALIE)

Orbital characteristics
- Apastron: 2.178 AU (325,800,000 km)
- Periastron: 1.666 AU (249,200,000 km)
- Semi-major axis: 1.922 ± 0.039 AU (287,500,000 ± 5,800,000 km)
- Eccentricity: 0.133 ± 0.011
- Orbital period (sidereal): 1008 ± 18 d 2.76 ± 0.049 y
- Time of periastron: 55301 ± 22
- Argument of periastron: -133.1 ± 6.9
- Star: HD 147018

HD 147018 c is a gas giant extrasolar planet which orbits the G-type main sequence star HD 147018, located approximately 140 light years away in the constellation Triangulum Australe. It has mass at least six and a half time more than Jupiter and orbits HD 147018 nearly twice the distance between the Earth and the Sun. This planet is eight times farther away than HD 147018 b. This planet was discovered on August 11, 2009 by radial velocity method.
