= X Trianguli Australis =

Variable star in the constellation Triangulum Australe

- Location of X Trianguli Australis (circled in red)

Observation data Epoch J2000 Equinox J2000
- Constellation: Triangulum Australe
- Right ascension: 15^{h} 14^{m} 19.17550^{s}
- Declination: −70° 04′ 46.1133″
- Apparent magnitude (V): +5.02 to 6.40

Characteristics
- Evolutionary stage: AGB
- Spectral type: C5.5
- B−V color index: 3.271±0.019
- Variable type: Lb

Astrometry
Radial velocity (R_{v})	−3.2±1.5 km/s
Proper motion (μ)	RA: +3.932 mas/yr Dec.: −8.402 mas/yr
Parallax (π)	2.8588±0.1525 mas
Distance	1,140 ± 60 ly (350 ± 20 pc)
Absolute magnitude (M_{V})	−1.97

Details
Mass	1.5 or 2 M_{☉}
Radius	535 (Note: Calculated multiplying the angular diameter (in arcseconds) to the distance in parsecs: 0.01382 • 360 = diameter of 4.975 AU, which multiplied by 107.5 to convert from AU to R_{☉} give 535 R_{☉}.) R_{☉}
Luminosity (bolometric)	12,815 L_{☉}
Surface gravity (log g)	−0.79 or −0.51 cgs
Temperature	2,650 K

Other designations
- X TrA, AAVSO 1504-69, CPD−69°2267, HD 134453, HIP 74582, HR 5644, SAO 253062

Database references
SIMBAD	data

X Trianguli Australis is a star in the southern constellation Triangulum Australe. It is a red-hued carbon star approximately 1,140 light years (350 parsecs) from Earth. It is a semi-regular variable star with two periods of around 385 and 455 days, and is of spectral type C5.5(Nb). It ranges from magnitude 5.03 to 6.05, making it faintly visible to the naked eye under excellent observing conditions. The discovery by Louisa Dennison Wells that the star is a variable star, was announced in 1898. Its designation is from the variable star designation developed by German astronomer Friedrich Wilhelm Argelander.

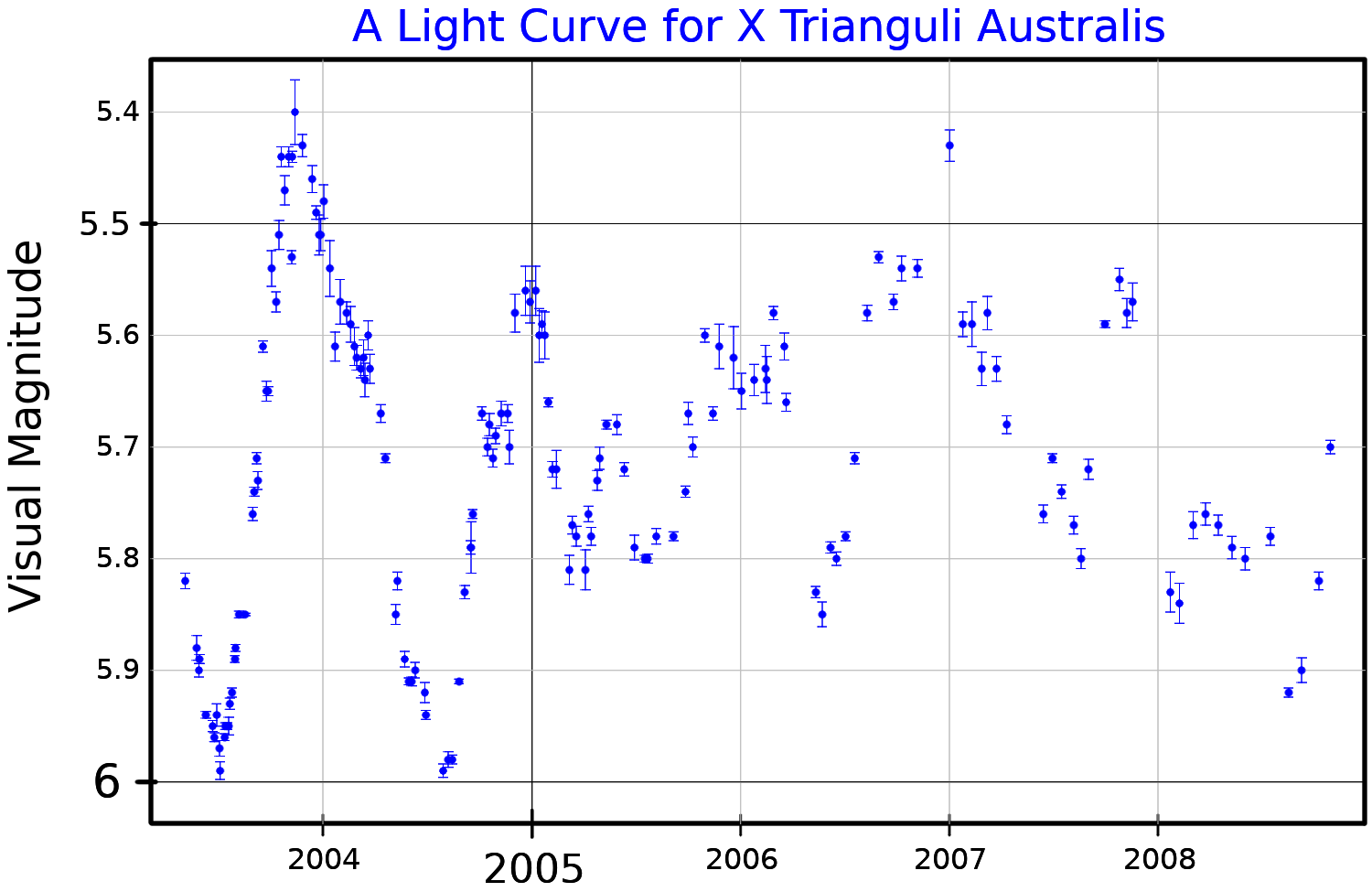
A visual band light curve for X Trianguli Australis, plotted from data published by Tabur et al. (2009)

It is a cool star, with of a surface effective temperature of 2,650 K (2,380 °C), yet luminous, emitting 13,000 times the luminosity of the Sun. Its angular diameter was measured at 13.82×10^{−3} arcseconds, which at its distance give a diameter 540 times that of the Sun. If placed at the center of the Solar System, it would stretch out farther than Mars' orbit. Its absolute magnitude is −1.97.
