= EK Trianguli Australis =

Star system in the constellation Triangulum Australe

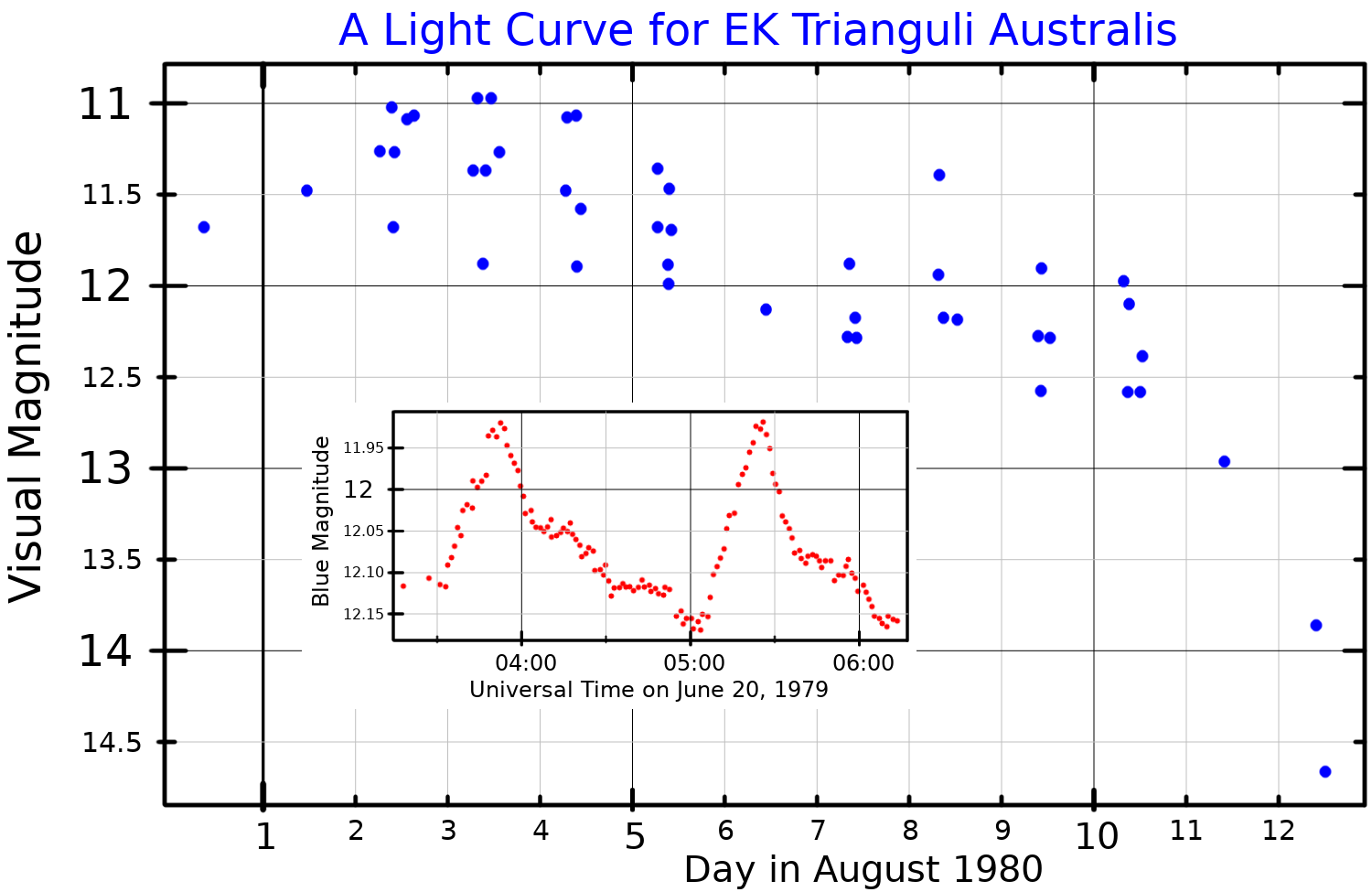
- A light curve for EK Trianguli Australis. The main plot, adapted from Hassall (1985), shows the fading after an outburst. The inset plot, adapted from Vogt and Semeniuk (1980), shows two superhumps.

Observation data Epoch J2000 Equinox J2000
- Constellation: Triangulum Australe
- Right ascension: 15^{h} 14^{m} 01.46928^{s}
- Declination: −65° 05′ 32.0604″
- Apparent magnitude (V): 10.4 − 16.4

Astrometry
Distance	>586 ly (>180 pc)

Other designations
- EK TrA, TIC 455226375, 2MASS J15140146-6505320

Database references
SIMBAD	data

EK Trianguli Australis is a star in the constellation Triangulum Australe. It is a dwarf nova of the SU Ursae Majoris type that officially classified as such in 1980, after the characteristic eruptions of a short eruption and a supereruption were observed in May 1978 and June 1979 respectively. These systems are characterised by frequent eruptions and less frequent supereruptions. The former are smooth, while the latter exhibit short "superhumps" of heightened activity. The distance of the system has been assumed at 180 parsecs (586 light years) from the Solar System, for the donor star (assumed to be a red dwarf that is nondetectable at that range). Spectroscopic analysis and calculation gave an estimate of 125 parsecs (407.5 light years).

EK Trianguli Australis was first observed on August 26, 1954. The earliest observations were made by New Zealand astronomers Albert Francis Arthur Lofley Jones and Frank Maine Bateson. The system consists of a white dwarf and a donor star which orbit around a common centre of gravity every 1.5 hours. The white dwarf sucks matter from the other star onto an accretion disc and periodically erupts, reaching apparent magnitude 11.2 in superoutbursts, 12.1 in normal outbursts and remaining at magnitude 16.7 when quiet. The "superhumps" see the star increase by 0.24 magnitude for 1.55 hours during these superoutbursts.

Spectroscopic observations of the white dwarf with the Hubble Space Telescope and Space Telescope Imaging Spectrograph reveal it to be spinning at a speed of 200 km/s, with a surface temperature of 18800 K and is estimated to have 0.6 the mass of the Sun. Up to 75% of the brightness of the object comes from the accretion disc, which is heated to a temperature of 6500 K.
