= S Trianguli Australis =

Variable star in the constellation Triangulum Australe

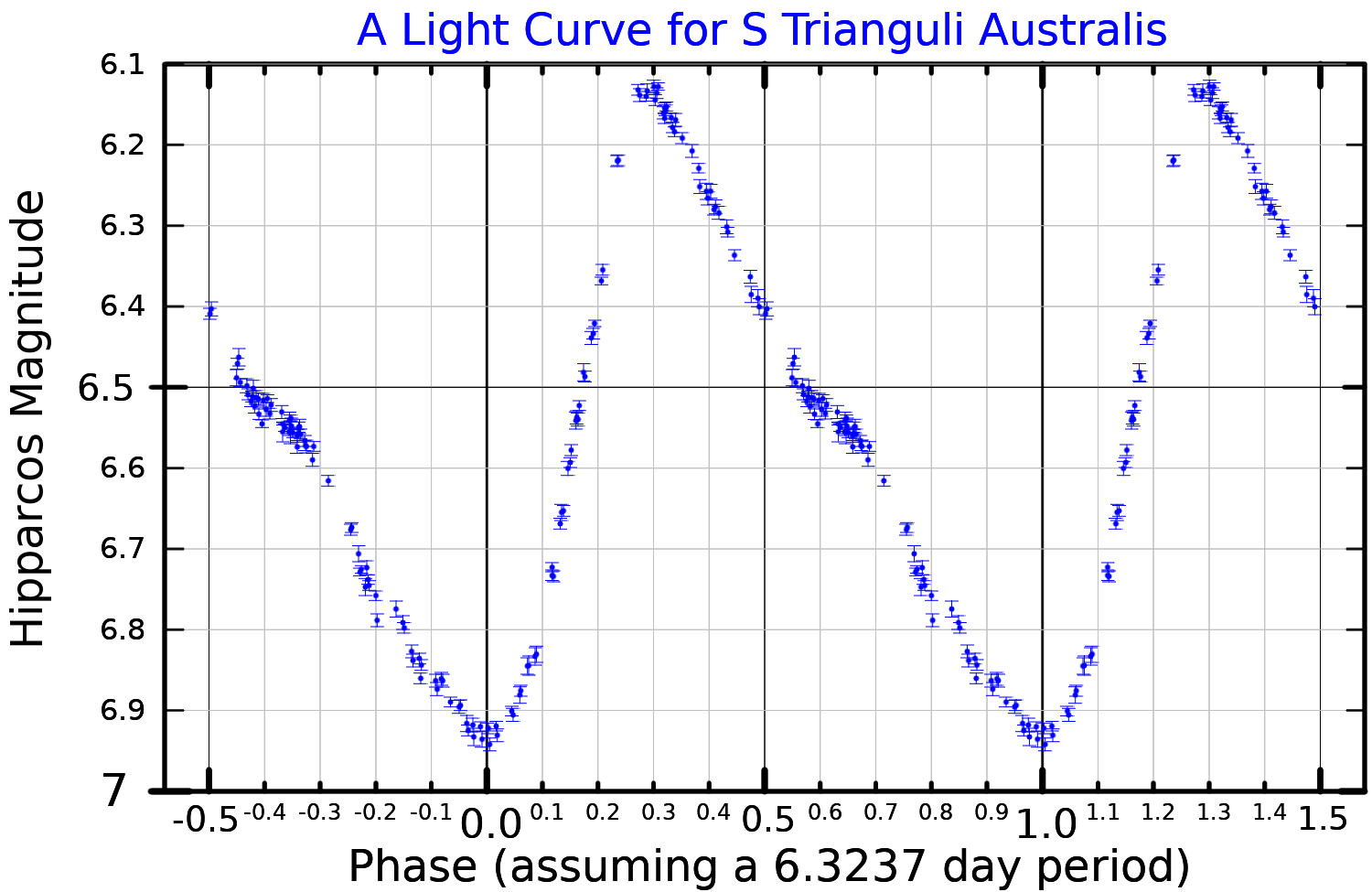
- A light curve for S Trianguli Australis, plotted from Hipparcos data

Observation data Epoch J2000 Equinox ICRS
- Constellation: Triangulum Australe
- Right ascension: 16^{h} 01^{m} 10.71590^{s}
- Declination: −63° 46′ 35.5324″
- Apparent magnitude (V): 5.95 – 6.81

Characteristics
- Spectral type: F8 II
- B−V color index: 0.567±0.020
- Variable type: δ Cep

Astrometry
Radial velocity (R_{v})	2.2±1.3 km/s
Proper motion (μ)	RA: −2.244 mas/yr Dec.: −2.804 mas/yr
Parallax (π)	1.0753±0.0301 mas
Distance	3,030 ± 80 ly (930 ± 30 pc)
Absolute magnitude (M_{V})	−3.53

Details
Mass	2.8 M_{☉}
Radius	39.2 R_{☉}
Surface gravity (log g)	2.1±0.1 cgs
Temperature	5,976±67 K
Metallicity [Fe/H]	0.12±0.05 dex

Other designations
- S TrA, CD−63° 1146, HD 142941, HIP 78476, HR 5939, SAO 253377

Database references
SIMBAD	data

S Trianguli Australis is a yellow-white hued variable star in the constellation Triangulum Australe. It is a dim star near the lower limit of visibility with the naked eye, having a typical apparent visual magnitude of about six. Based upon an annual parallax shift of 1.08 mas, it is located 3,030 light years from the Earth.

Benjamin Apthorp Gould discovered that this star's brightness varies, and published that discovery in his 1879 work Uranometria Argentina. A Classical Cepheid variable, its apparent magnitude ranges from 5.95 to 6.81 over 6.32344 days. It is a bright giant with a nominal stellar classification of F8 II, that pulsates between spectral types F6II-G2. The star has 2.8 times the mass of the Sun and 39.2 times the Sun's radius. It is losing mass at the estimated rate of 2.8×10^{−10} M_{☉}·yr^{−1}.
