= Zeta Trianguli Australis =

Binary star system in the constellation Triangulum Australe

- Location of ζ Trianguli Australis (circled in red)

Observation data Epoch J2000 Equinox ICRS
- Constellation: Triangulum Australe
- Right ascension: 16^{h} 28^{m} 28.14362^{s}
- Declination: −70° 05′ 03.8419″
- Apparent magnitude (V): 4.91

Characteristics
- Spectral type: F9V + M4V
- U−B color index: +0.02
- B−V color index: +0.55

Astrometry
Radial velocity (R_{v})	+8.3 km/s
Proper motion (μ)	RA: 200.742 mas/yr Dec.: 109.341 mas/yr
Parallax (π)	82.8699±0.1627 mas
Distance	39.36 ± 0.08 ly (12.07 ± 0.02 pc)
Absolute magnitude (M_{V})	4.49

Orbit
Period (P)	12.97662±0.00017 d
Eccentricity (e)	0.01442±0.00021
Inclination (i)	35±19°
Periastron epoch (T)	JD 2452752.31955
Argument of periastron (ω) (secondary)	252.98°±0.80°
Semi-amplitude (K_{1}) (primary)	7.4988±0.0016 km/s

Details

ζ TrA A
Mass	1.12 M_{☉}
Radius	1.02±0.02 R_{☉}
Luminosity	1.41+0.15 −0.09 L_{☉}
Surface gravity (log g)	4.42+0.04 −0.05 cgs
Temperature	6,210+180 −120 K
Metallicity [Fe/H]	−0.09±0.06 dex
Rotation	13 days
Rotational velocity (v sin i)	3.23 km/s
Age	600–900 Myr

ζ TrA B
Mass	0.30 M_{☉}
Temperature	3,327 K

Other designations
- CPD−69°2558, FK5 610, GJ 624, HD 147584, HIP 80686, HR 6098, SAO 253554, LTT 6558

Database references
SIMBAD	data
ARICNS	data

Zeta Trianguli Australis is a spectroscopic binary star system in the southern constellation Triangulum Australe. The pair have a combined apparent visual magnitude of 4.90, which is bright enough to be visible to the naked eye. Based on parallax measurements, the system is located at a distance of approximately 39.4 light years from Earth. After closing to within 31.3 ly (9.59 pc) some 436,600 years ago, it is now drifting farther away with a radial velocity of +8.3 km/s.

The pair orbit each other once every 13 days, and the orbital eccentricity is a low 0.014, making their orbit nearly circular. The primary component has a stellar classification of F9V, matching an F-type main-sequence star. It has a mass equal to 1.12 times the mass of the Sun, a radius 1.06 times the radius of the Sun, and irradiated at an effective temperature of 6,032 K, slightly hotter than the Sun as well. The companion is a small red dwarf star with a class in the range of M1–7V and 40% of the Sun's mass. The age of the system is estimated at 600–900 million years.

Any objects orbiting the pair in a circumbinary orbit should have an orbital separation of 0.217 AU or higher; otherwise its orbit would be unstable due to gravitational interactions.

Somewhat surprisingly for a star located at a declination of 70° S, it is a candidate swarm member of the Ursa Major moving group. However, there is some evidence to the contrary.
