= Kappa Trianguli Australis =

Variable star in the constellation Triangulum Australe

κ Trianguli Australis
- Location of κ Trianguli Australis (circled)

Observation data Epoch J2000.0 Equinox J2000.0 (ICRS)
- Constellation: Triangulum Australe
- Right ascension: 15^{h} 55^{m} 29.59831^{s}
- Declination: −68° 36′ 10.8101″
- Apparent magnitude (V): +5.08

Characteristics
- Spectral type: G3/5 Ib
- B−V color index: +1.12
- Variable type: suspected SRD

Astrometry
| Radial velocity (R_{v}) | +3.9±0.3 km/s |
| Proper motion (μ) | RA: −9.36 mas/yr Dec.: −6.79 mas/yr |
| Parallax (π) | 2.70±0.26 mas |
| Distance | 1,200 ± 100 ly (370 ± 40 pc) |
| Absolute magnitude (M_{V}) | −2.71 |

Details
| Mass | 7.0 M_{☉} |
| Luminosity | 1,761 L_{☉} |
| Surface gravity (log g) | 1.90 cgs |
| Temperature | 4,658 K |
| Metallicity [Fe/H] | +0.21 dex |
| Rotational velocity (v sin i) | 7.7±1.0 km/s |
| Age | 55.2 Myr |

Other designations
- κ TrA, CPD−68°2585, FK5 3253, HD 141767, HIP 77982, HR 5891, SAO 253342

Database references
| SIMBAD | data |

Kappa Trianguli Australis (κ Trianguli Australis) is a star in the constellation Triangulum Australe. It is a yellow G-type supergiant with an apparent magnitude of +5.08, making it visible to the naked eye under good observing conditions. It is around 1,200 light years from Earth.

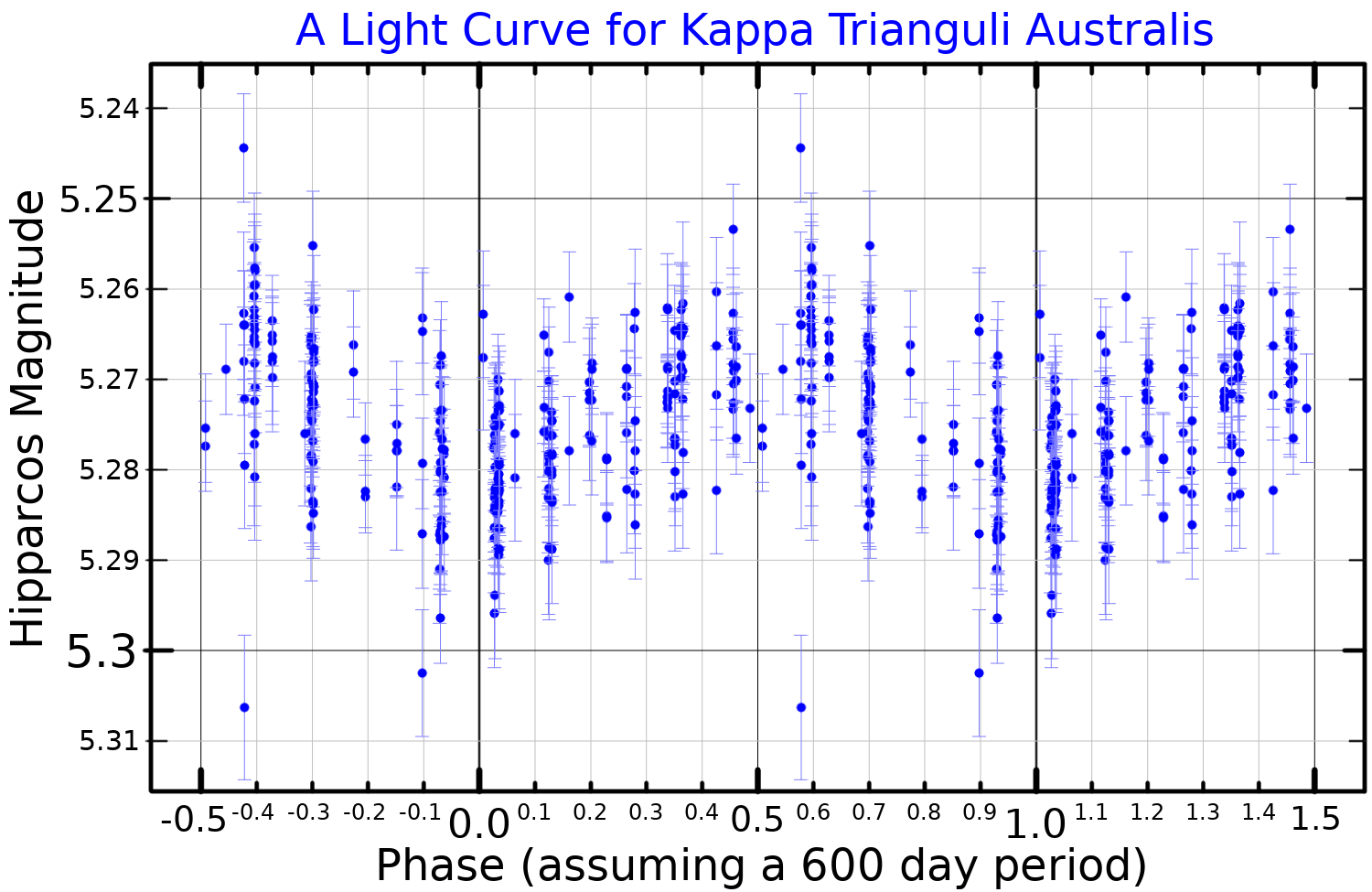
A light curve for Kappa Trianguli Australis, plotted from Hipparcos data

It is not generally listed as a variable star but Hipparcos photometry showed small amplitude brightness changes. The dominant period was around 600 days and the amplitude less than a hundredth of a magnitude.
