= HD 147018 b =

Extrasolar planet in the constellation Triangulum Australe

Discovery
- Discovered by: Segransan et al.
- Discovery site: La Silla Observatory
- Discovery date: August 11, 2009
- Detection method: radial velocity (CORALIE)

Orbital characteristics
- Apastron: 0.3507 AU (52,460,000 km)
- Periastron: 0.1269 AU (18,980,000 km)
- Semi-major axis: 0.2388 ± 0.0039 AU (35,720,000 ± 580,000 km)
- Eccentricity: 0.4686 ± 0.0081
- Orbital period (sidereal): 44.236 ± 0.008 d 0.12111 ± 2e-5 y
- Time of periastron: 4459.49 ± 0.1
- Argument of periastron: -24.03 ± 1.23
- Star: HD 147018

HD 147018 b is a gas giant extrasolar planet which orbits the G-type main sequence star HD 147018, located approximately 140 light years away in the constellation Triangulum Australe. This planet has minimum mass more than twice that of Jupiter but this planet orbits a lot closer to the star than Jupiter to the Sun by a factor of 22. Meanwhile, it has an eccentric orbit. The planet can get as close to the star as 0.13 AU or can get as far as 0.35 AU. Further out, there is another superjovian planet HD 147018 c, which was discovered on the same date as this planet, on August 11, 2009.
