= BL Herculis =

Variable star in the constellation Hercules

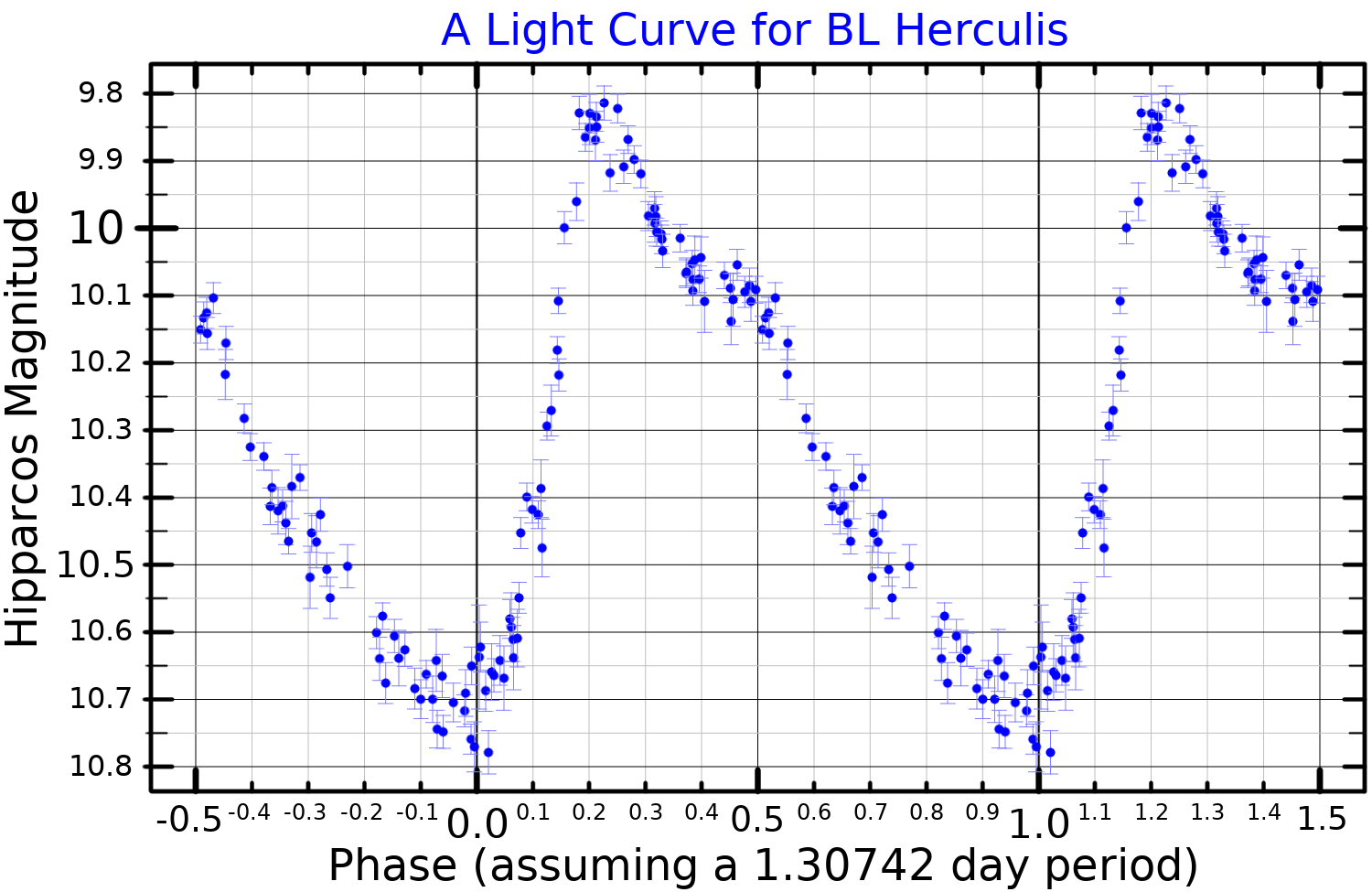
- A light curve for BL Herculis, plotted from Hipparcos data

Observation data Epoch J2000 Equinox J2000
- Constellation: Hercules
- Right ascension: 18^{h} 01^{m} 09.224^{s}
- Declination: 19° 14′ 56.70″
- Apparent magnitude (V): 9.70 to 10.62

Characteristics
- Evolutionary stage: F0-F6II-III
- B−V color index: 0.05
- Variable type: BL Her

Astrometry
Proper motion (μ)	RA: −4.051 mas/yr Dec.: −11.847 mas/yr
Parallax (π)	0.8469±0.0179 mas
Distance	3,850 ± 80 ly (1,180 ± 20 pc)
Absolute magnitude (M_{V})	−0.3

Details
Mass	0.75 M_{☉}
Radius	8.6 R_{☉}
Luminosity	101 L_{☉}
Surface gravity (log g)	2.53 cgs
Temperature	6,500 - 7,000 K
Metallicity [Fe/H]	−0.1 - −0.2 dex
Age	377 Myr

Other designations
- BL Her, HD 347827, HIP 88242, 2MASS J18010922+1914567

Database references
SIMBAD	data

BL Herculis is a variable star in the northern constellation of Hercules. Its apparent visual magnitude ranges from 9.70 to 10.62, so it is never bright enough to be seen with the naked eye, even with ideal observing conditions. Its distance from the Sun is about 3,850 light-years, and it is moving away from us at 18 km/sec. It is the prototype of the BL Herculis class of variable star, a short-period subset of the pulsating Cepheid variables.

The variability of BL Herculis was discovered by Cuno Hoffmeister, and announced in 1929. Early observations of the star produced a very inaccurate period of 4.2 days, which resulted in peculiar light and radial velocity curves. The first accurate period, 1.3 days, was published by Pavel Parenago in 1940. and a far more precise period of 1.30744185 days was derived from photometric observations in 1983. The descending portion of the star's light curve shows a "bump" (near phase=0.3, with peak brightness phase defined as 0), which models suggest arises from a 2:1 resonance between the fundamental and second overtone pulsation modes. This bump is considered the primary characteristic of BL Her stars, although its position relative to peak brightness varies as a function of the star's period.

The mass of BL Herculis is estimated to be about 0.75 solar masses, just slightly greater than the mass of a typical RR Lyrae variable.
