= Alpha Trianguli Australis =

Star in the constellation Triangulum Australe

α Trianguli Australis
- Location of α Trianguli Australis (circled)

Observation data Epoch J2000 Equinox ICRS
- Constellation: Triangulum Australe
- Right ascension: 16^{h} 48^{m} 39.89508^{s}
- Declination: −69° 01′ 39.7626″
- Apparent magnitude (V): 1.91

Characteristics
- Evolutionary stage: Red supergiant
- Spectral type: K2Ib-IIa
- U−B color index: +1.56
- B−V color index: +1.44

Astrometry
| Radial velocity (R_{v}) | −3.3 km/s |
| Proper motion (μ) | RA: +17.99 mas/yr Dec.: −31.58 mas/yr |
| Parallax (π) | 8.35±0.15 mas |
| Distance | 391 ± 7 ly (120 ± 2 pc) |
| Absolute magnitude (M_{V}) | −3.68 |

Details
| Mass | 6.4 M_{☉} |
| Radius | 139 R_{☉} |
| Luminosity | 4,634 L_{☉} |
| Surface gravity (log g) | 0.96 cgs |
| Temperature | 4,043 K |
| Metallicity [Fe/H] | −0.14 dex |
| Rotational velocity (v sin i) | 5.0 km/s |
| Age | 48 Myr |

Other designations
- Atria, HR 6217, CD−68°2822, HD 150798, SAO 253700, FK5 625, GC 22558, HIP 82273

Database references
| SIMBAD | data |

Alpha Trianguli Australis (Latinised from α Trianguli Australis, abbreviated Alpha TrA, α TrA), officially named Atria (/ˈeɪtriə/), is the brightest star in the southern constellation of Triangulum Australe, forming an apex of a triangle with Beta Trianguli Australis and Gamma Trianguli Australis that gives the constellation its name (Latin for southern triangle).

== Nomenclature ==
α Trianguli Australis (Latinised to Alpha Trianguli Australis) is the star's Bayer designation. The historical name Atria is a contraction. In 2016, the International Astronomical Union organized a Working Group on Star Names (WGSN) to catalog and standardize proper names for stars. The WGSN's first bulletin of July 2016 included a table of the first two batches of names approved by the WGSN; which included Atria for this star.

In Chinese caused by adaptation of the European southern hemisphere constellations into the Chinese system, 三角形 (Sān Jiǎo Xíng), meaning Triangle, refers to an asterism consisting of α Trianguli Australis, β Trianguli Australis and γ Trianguli Australis. Consequently, α Trianguli Australis itself is known as 三角形三 (Sān Jiǎo Xíng sān, English: the Third Star of Triangle.)

== Physical characteristics ==
Atria is a red supergiant star with an apparent magnitude of +1.91. Based upon parallax measurements, this star is located roughly 391 light-years (120 parsecs) distant from the Earth. The estimated age of the star is 48 million years old; sufficiently old for a massive star to evolve away from the main sequence. N. Covacs give Atria a stellar classification of K2IIb-IIIa, with the luminosity class indicating an evolutionary stage between a bright giant and a regular giant. However, a study led by Thomas R. Ayres found that its absolute magnitude is similar to that of supergiants such as Beta Aquarii or Beta Camelopardalis, so its stellar classification should be at least K2Ib-IIa.

It has a mass about 6.4 times the mass of the Sun, but is emitting about 4,600 times the Sun's luminosity. The effective temperature of the star's outer envelope is 4,634 K, which gives it the characteristic orange hue of a K-type star. With a diameter 139 times that of the Sun, it would reach or almost reach the orbit of Venus if placed at the centre of the Solar System.

There is evidence that Atria may be a binary star. It displays unusual properties for a star of its class, including stellar flares and a higher than normal emission of X-rays. These can be explained by a young, magnetically active companion with a stellar classification of about G0 V. Such a star would have a mass similar to the Sun, with an orbital period of at least 130 years. Young, G-type stars have a high temperature corona and frequently emit flares causing sudden increases in luminosity. The pair may be separated by about 50 astronomical units.

== In culture ==
Atria appears on the flag of Brazil, symbolizing the state of Rio Grande do Sul.
