= Iota Trianguli Australis =

Binary star in the constellation Triangulum Australe

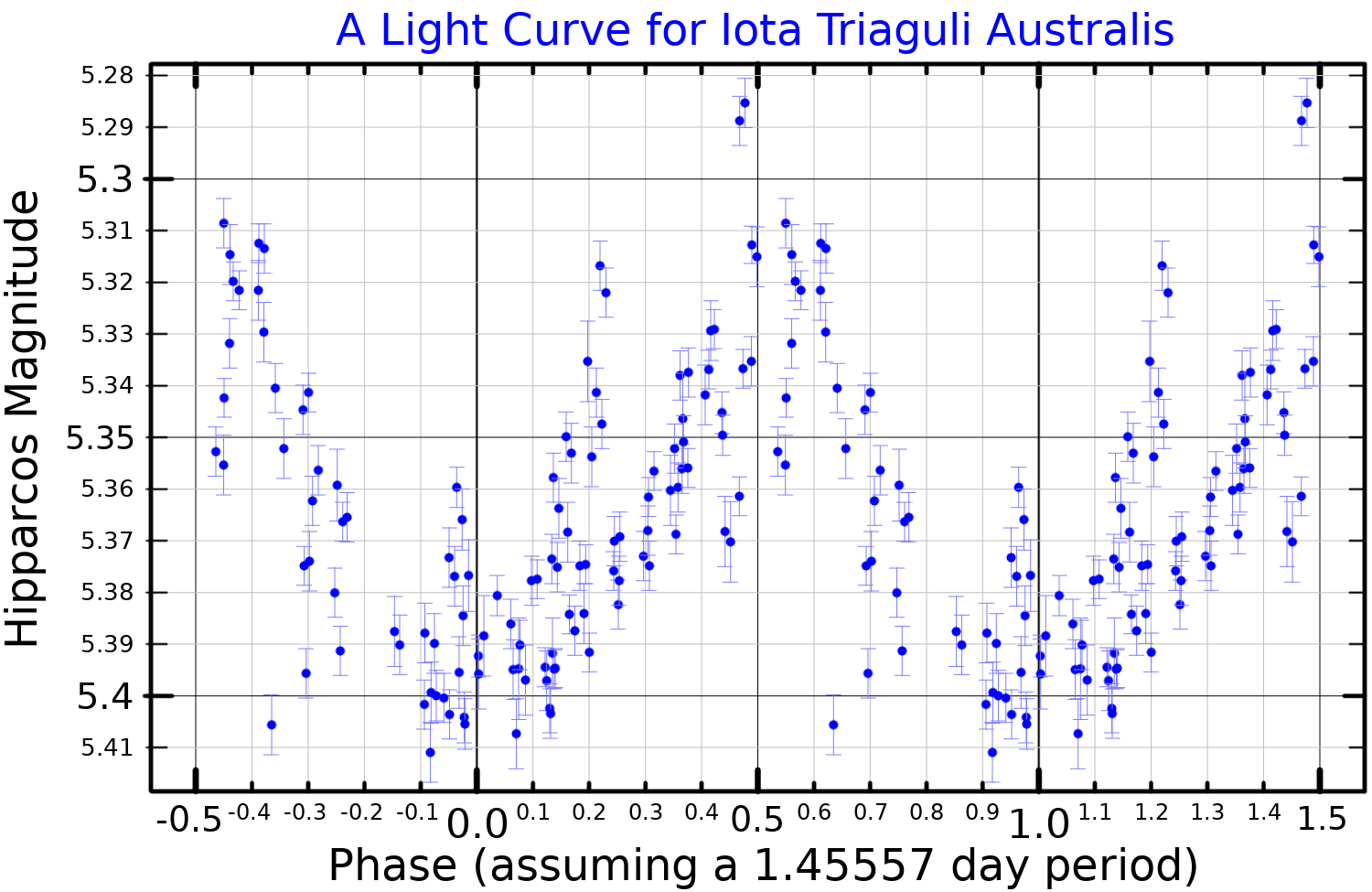
- A light curve for Iota Trianguli Australis, plotted from Hipparcos data

Observation data Epoch J2000.0 Equinox J2000.0 (ICRS)
- Constellation: Triangulum Australe
- Right ascension: 16^{h} 27^{m} 57.34498^{s}
- Declination: −64° 03′ 28.5964″
- Apparent magnitude (V): +5.27

Characteristics
- Spectral type: F4 IV (F0(V) + F5(V)‍)
- U−B color index: −0.02
- B−V color index: +0.36
- Variable type: γ Dor

Astrometry
Radial velocity (R_{v})	−5.6±4.2 km/s
Proper motion (μ)	RA: +53.12 mas/yr Dec.: +25.45 mas/yr
Parallax (π)	25.77±0.51 mas
Distance	127 ± 3 ly (38.8 ± 0.8 pc)
Absolute magnitude (M_{V})	+2.34

Orbit
Period (P)	39.880±0.002 d
Eccentricity (e)	0.253±0.004
Periastron epoch (T)	54661.65 ± 0.11 HJD
Argument of periastron (ω) (secondary)	93.1±1.1°
Semi-amplitude (K_{1}) (primary)	38.4±0.3 km/s
Semi-amplitude (K_{2}) (secondary)	43.9±0.3 km/s

Details

ι TrA A
Mass	1.42 M_{☉}
Surface gravity (log g)	4.28±0.14 cgs
Temperature	7,045±240 K
Metallicity [Fe/H]	−0.16 dex
Rotational velocity (v sin i)	13.0±0.9 km/s
Age	735 Myr

ι TrA B
Rotational velocity (v sin i)	10.0±1.7 km/s

Other designations
- ι TrA, CPD−63°3923, GC 22100, HD 147787, HIP 80645, HR 6109, SAO 253555, CCDM 16280-6403, WDS J16280-6403A

Database references
SIMBAD	data

Iota Trianguli Australis (ι Trianguli Australis) is a binary star system in the constellation Triangulum Australe. It is visible to the naked eye with a combined apparent visual magnitude of +5.27. Based upon an annual parallax shift of 25.77 mas as seen from the Earth, it is located around 127 light years from the Sun. The system appears to be moving closer to the Sun with a radial velocity of around −6 km/s.

Iota Trianguli Australis is a double-lined spectroscopic binary system with an orbital period of 39.88 days and an eccentricity of 0.25. The brighter member, component A, is yellow-white hued F-type subgiant star and a Gamma Doradus type variable, pulsating by 0.12 magnitudes with a dominant period of 1.45 days.

There a magnitude 9.42 visual companion, located 16.2 arcseconds away. The pair show as a yellow and a white star when seen though a 7.5 cm telescope.
