= HD 147018 =

Star in the southern constellation of Triangulum Australe

Observation data Epoch J2000 Equinox ICRS
- Constellation: Triangulum Australe
- Right ascension: 16^{h} 23^{m} 00.14788^{s}
- Declination: −61° 41′ 19.5599″
- Apparent magnitude (V): 8.30

Characteristics
- Evolutionary stage: main sequence
- Spectral type: G8/K0V
- Apparent magnitude (B): 9.063
- Apparent magnitude (J): 6.963±0.023
- Apparent magnitude (H): 6.640±0.044
- Apparent magnitude (K): 6.571±0.021
- B−V color index: 0.763±0.002

Astrometry
Radial velocity (R_{v})	−27.5±0.3 km/s
Proper motion (μ)	RA: −177.896 mas/yr Dec.: −316.435 mas/yr
Parallax (π)	24.7763±0.0217 mas
Distance	131.6 ± 0.1 ly (40.36 ± 0.04 pc)
Absolute magnitude (M_{V})	5.14

Details
Mass	0.96±0.12 M_{☉}
Radius	0.93±0.04 R_{☉}
Luminosity	0.71±0.02 L_{☉}
Surface gravity (log g)	4.48±0.08 cgs
Temperature	5,489±110 K
Metallicity [Fe/H]	0.10±0.05 dex
Rotation	31.1 days
Rotational velocity (v sin i)	1.56 km/s
Age	6.36±4.33 Gyr

Other designations
- CD−61°5387, CPD−61°5655, HIP 80250, SAO 253526, LTT 6522, NLTT 42574

Database references
SIMBAD	data
Exoplanet Archive	data

HD 147018 is a star in the southern constellation of Triangulum Australe. It has a yellow-orange hue with an apparent visual magnitude of 8.30, which is too faint to be seen with the naked eye but can be viewed with a small telescope. The star is located at a distance of 132 light years from the Sun based on parallax, but is drifting closer with a radial velocity of −27.5 km/s.

The stellar classification of HD 147018 is G8/K0V or G9V, matching a late G-type main-sequence star that is generating energy through core hydrogen fusion. It is roughly six billion years old and is spinning with a projected rotational velocity of 1.56 km/s. The star has 96% of the mass of the Sun and 93% of the Sun's radius. The metallicity, or abundance of heavier elements, is higher than in the Sun. The star is radiating 71% of the luminosity of the Sun from its photosphere at an effective temperature of 5,489 K.

In August 2009, two extrasolar planets, HD 147018 b and HD 147018 c, were reported to be orbiting this star. The planets were found using the radial velocity method, using the CORALIE spectrograph at La Silla Observatory, Chile.

The HD 147018 planetary system
Companion (in order from star)	Mass	Semimajor axis (AU)	Orbital period (days)	Eccentricity	Inclination (°)	Radius
b	≥2.12±0.07 M_{J}	0.2388±0.0039	44.236±0.008	0.4686±0.0081	—	—
c	≥6.56±0.32 M_{J}	1.922±0.039	1,008±18	0.133±0.011	—	—

== See also ==
- List of extrasolar planets
