= Epsilon Trianguli Australis =

Star in the constellation Triangulum Australe

- Location of ε Trianguli Australis (circled in red)

Observation data Epoch J2000.0 Equinox J2000.0 (ICRS)
- Constellation: Triangulum Australe
- Right ascension: 15^{h} 36^{m} 43.22223^{s}
- Declination: −66° 19′ 01.3334″
- Apparent magnitude (V): +4.11

Characteristics
- Spectral type: K0 III
- U−B color index: +1.16
- B−V color index: +1.17

Astrometry
Radial velocity (R_{v})	−15.5±2.7 km/s
Proper motion (μ)	RA: +24.35 mas/yr Dec.: −54.47 mas/yr
Parallax (π)	16.17±0.18 mas
Distance	202 ± 2 ly (61.8 ± 0.7 pc)
Absolute bolometric magnitude (M_{bol})	−0.16±0.10

Details
Mass	1-2 M_{☉}
Radius	16.2±0.2 R_{☉}
Luminosity	91 L_{☉}
Surface gravity (log g)	2.20+0.14 −0.19 cgs
Temperature	4,436 K

Other designations
- ε TrA, CPD−65°3102, FK5 574, HD 138538, HIP 76440, HR 5771, SAO 253226, WDS J15367-6619

Database references
SIMBAD	data

Epsilon Trianguli Australis, Latinized from ε Trianguli Australis, is a star in the southern circumpolar constellation of Triangulum Australe. It is visible to the naked eye with an apparent visual magnitude of +4.11. Based upon an annual parallax shift of 16.17 mas as seen from the Earth, the star is located about 340 light years from the Sun. The star is moving closer to the Sun with a radial velocity of around −15.5 km/s.

This is an evolved K-type giant star with a stellar classification of K0 III. It has around 1−2 times the mass of the Sun and has expanded to 16.2 times the Sun's radius. The star is radiating 91 times the Sun's luminosity from its enlarged photosphere at an effective temperature of 5,039 K. It has an A5 type magnitude 9.36 companion at an angular separation of 81.9 arc seconds along a position angle of 220°, as of 2010. The pair may form a wide binary system.
