= Triangulum Australe =

Constellation in the southern celestial hemisphere

- Constellation
- List of stars in Triangulum Australe
- Abbreviation: TrA
- Genitive: Trianguli Australis
- Pronunciation: /traɪˈæŋɡjʊləm ɒsˈtreɪliː/, genitive /traɪˈæŋɡjʊlaɪ ɒˈstreɪlɪs/
- Symbolism: the Southern Triangle
- Right ascension: 14^{h} 56.4^{m} –17^{h} 13.5^{m}
- Declination: −60.26°–−70.51°
- Quadrant: SQ3
- Area: 110 sq. deg. (83rd)
- Main stars: 3
- Bayer/Flamsteed stars: 10
- Stars brighter than 3.00^{m}: 3
- Stars within 10.00 pc (32.62 ly): 1
- Brightest star: α TrA (Atria) (1.91^{m})
- Nearest star: WISE 1639−6847
- Messier objects: 0
- Meteor showers: 0
- Bordering constellations: Norma; Ara; Circinus; Apus
- Visible at latitudes between +20° and −90°. Best visible at 21:00 (9 p.m.) during the month of July.

Triangulum Australe is a small constellation in the far Southern Celestial Hemisphere. Its name is Latin for "the southern triangle", which distinguishes it from Triangulum in the northern sky and is derived from the acute, almost equilateral pattern of its three brightest stars. Its stars are also brighter than Triangulum's stars, despite being smaller. It was first depicted on a celestial globe as Triangulus Antarcticus by Petrus Plancius in 1589, and later with more accuracy and its current name by Johann Bayer in his 1603 Uranometria. The French explorer and astronomer Nicolas Louis de Lacaille charted and gave the brighter stars their Bayer designations in 1756.

Alpha Trianguli Australis, known as Atria, is a second-magnitude orange giant and the brightest star in the constellation, as well as the 42nd-brightest star in the night sky. Completing the triangle are the two white main sequence stars Beta and Gamma Trianguli Australis. Although the constellation lies in the Milky Way and contains many stars, deep-sky objects are not prominent. Notable features include the open cluster NGC 6025 and planetary nebula NGC 5979.

The Great Attractor, the gravitational center of the Laniakea Supercluster which includes the Milky Way galaxy, straddles Triangulum Australe and the neighboring constellation Norma.

== History ==
Italian navigator Amerigo Vespucci explored the New World at the beginning of the 16th century. He learnt to recognize the stars in the southern hemisphere and made a catalogue for his patron king Manuel I of Portugal, which is now lost. As well as the catalogue, Vespucci wrote descriptions of the southern stars, including a triangle which may be either Triangulum Australe or Apus. This was sent to his patron in Florence, Lorenzo di Pierfrancesco de' Medici, and published as Mundus Novus in 1504. The first depiction of the constellation was provided in 1589 by Flemish astronomer and clergyman Petrus Plancius on a 32 1/2-cm diameter celestial globe published in Amsterdam by Dutch cartographer Jacob van Langren, where it was called Triangulus Antarcticus and incorrectly portrayed to the south of Argo Navis. His student Petrus Keyzer, along with Dutch explorer Frederick de Houtman, coined the name Den Zuyden Trianghel. Triangulum Australe was more accurately depicted in Johann Bayer's celestial atlas Uranometria in 1603, where it was also given its current name.

Nicolas Louis de Lacaille portrayed the constellations of Norma, Circinus and Triangulum Australe as a set square and ruler, a compass, and a surveyor's level respectively in a set of draughtsman's instruments in his 1756 map of the southern stars. Also depicting it as a surveyor's level, German Johann Bode gave it the alternate name of Libella in his Uranographia.

German poet and author Philippus Caesius saw the three main stars as representing the Three Patriarchs, Abraham, Isaac and Jacob (with Atria as Abraham). The Wardaman people of the Northern Territory in Australia perceived the stars of Triangulum Australe as the tail of the Rainbow Serpent, which stretched out from near Crux across to Scorpius. Overhead in October, the Rainbow Serpent "gives Lightning a nudge" to bring on the wet season rains in November.

== Characteristics ==
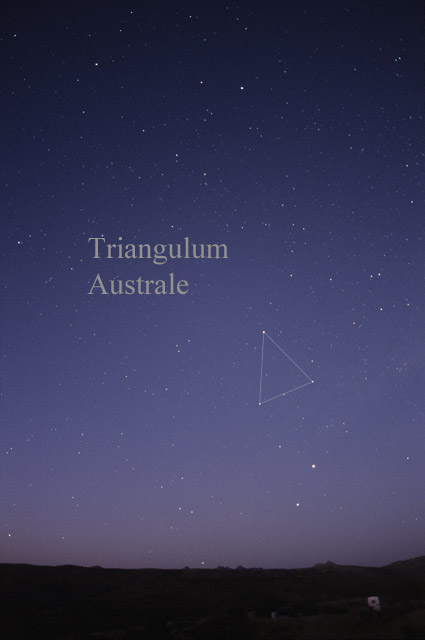
The constellation Triangulum Australe, the southern triangle, as it can be seen by the naked eye

Triangulum Australe is a small constellation bordered by Norma to the north, Circinus to the west, Apus to the south and Ara to the east. It lies near the Pointers (Alpha and Beta Centauri), with only Circinus in between. The constellation is located within the Milky Way, and hence has many stars. A roughly equilateral triangle, it is easily identifiable. Triangulum Australe lies too far south in the celestial southern hemisphere to be visible from Europe, yet is circumpolar from most of the southern hemisphere. The three-letter abbreviation for the constellation, as adopted by the International Astronomical Union in 1922, is "TrA". The official constellation boundaries, as set by Belgian astronomer Eugène Delporte in 1930, are defined by a polygon of 18 segments. In the equatorial coordinate system, the right ascension coordinates of these borders lie between 14^{h} 56.4^{m} and 17^{h} 13.5^{m} , while the declination coordinates are between −60.26° and −70.51°. Triangulum Australe culminates each year at 9 p.m. on 23 August.

== Features ==
=== Bright stars ===
In defining the constellation, Lacaille gave twelve stars Bayer designations of Alpha through to Lambda, with two close stars called Eta (one now known by its Henry Draper catalogue number), while Lambda was later dropped due to its dimness. The three brightest stars, Alpha, Beta and Gamma, make up the triangle. Readily identified by its orange hue, Alpha Trianguli Australis is a bright giant star of spectral type K2 IIb-IIIa with an apparent magnitude of +1.91 that is the 42nd-brightest star in the night sky. It lies 424 light-years (130 parsecs) away and has an absolute magnitude of −3.68 and is 5,500 times more luminous than the Sun. With a diameter 130 times that of the Sun, it would almost reach the orbit of Venus if placed at the centre of the Solar System. The proper name Atria is a contraction of its Bayer designation. Beta Trianguli Australis is a double star, the primary being a F-type main-sequence star with a stellar classification of F1V, and an apparent magnitude of 2.85. Lying only 40 light-years (12 parsecs) away, it has an absolute magnitude of 2.38. Its companion, almost 3 arcminutes away, is a 13th-magnitude star which may or may not be in orbit around Beta. The remaining member of the triangle is Gamma Trianguli Australis with an apparent magnitude of 2.87. It is an A-type main sequence star of spectral class A1 V, which lies 180 light-years (55 parsecs) away.

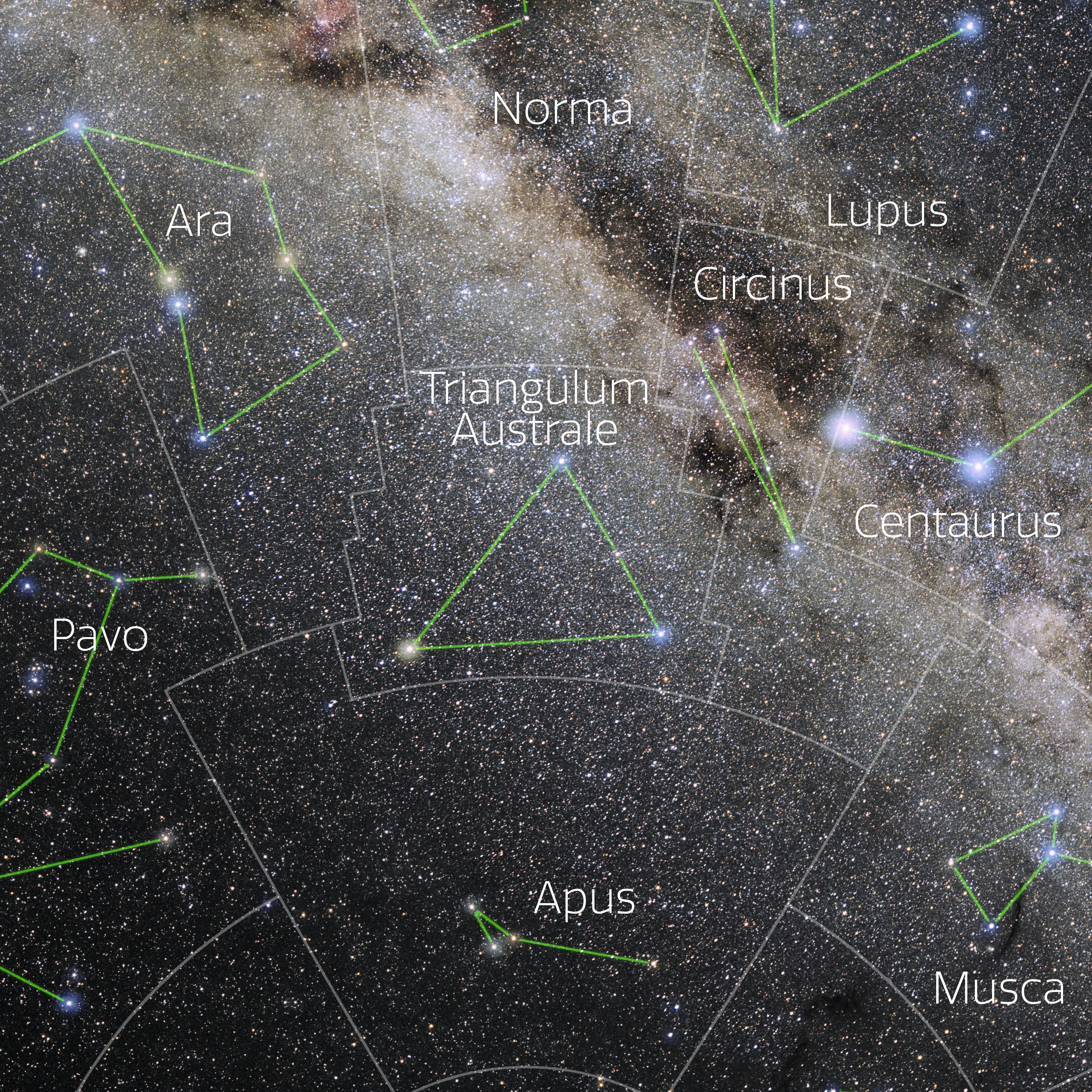
The constellation Triangulum Australe showing the IAU boundaries, the constellation stick figure, and labels for its brightest stars. Astrophotograph by Eckhard Slawik, from NOIRLab's 88 Constellations project.

Located outside the triangle near Beta, Delta Trianguli Australis is the fourth-brightest star at apparent magnitude +3.8. It is a yellow giant of spectral type G2Ib-II and lies 606 light-years (186 parsecs) away. Lying halfway between Beta and Gamma, Epsilon Trianguli Australis is an optical double. The brighter star, Epsilon Trianguli Australis A, is an orange K-type sub-giant of spectral type K1.5III with an apparent magnitude of +4.11. The optical companion, Epsilon Trianguli Australis B (or HD 138510), is a white main sequence star of spectral type A9IV/V which has an apparent magnitude of +9.32. Zeta Trianguli Australis appears as a star of apparent magnitude +4.91 and spectral class F9V, but is actually a spectroscopic binary with a near companion, probably a red dwarf. The pair orbit each other once every 13 days. A young star, its proper motion indicates it is a member of the Ursa Major moving group. Iota Trianguli Australis shows itself to be a multiple star system composed of a yellow and a white star when seen though a 7.5 cm telescope. The brighter star has a spectral type of F4IV and is a spectroscopic binary whose components are two yellow-white stars which orbit each other every 39.88 days. The primary is a Gamma Doradus variable, pulsating over a period of 1.45 days. The fainter star is not associated with the system, hence the system is an optical double. HD 147018 is a Sun-like star of apparent magnitude 8.3 and spectral type G9V, which was found to have two exoplanets, HD 147018 b and HD 147018 c, in 2009.

Of apparent magnitude 5.11, the yellow bright giant Kappa Trianguli Australis of spectral type G5IIa lies around 1,207 light-years (370 parsecs) distant from the Solar System. Eta Trianguli Australis (or Eta1 Trianguli Australis) is a Be star of spectral type B7IVe which is 661 light-years (203 parsecs) from Earth, with an apparent magnitude of 5.89. Lacaille named a close-by star as Eta as well, which was inconsistently followed by Francis Baily, who used the name for the brighter or both stars in two different publications. Despite their faintness, Benjamin Gould upheld their Bayer designation as they were closer than 25 degrees to the south celestial pole. The second Eta is now designated as HD 150550. It is a variable star of average magnitude 6.53 and spectral type A1III.

=== Variable stars ===
Triangulum Australe contains several cepheid variables, all of which are too faint to be seen with the naked eye: R Trianguli Australis ranges from apparent magnitude 6.4 to 6.9 over a period of 3.389 days, S Trianguli Australis varies from magnitude 6.1 to 6.8 over 6.323 days, and U Trianguli Australis' brightness changes from 7.5 to 8.3 over 2.568 days. All three are yellow-white giants of spectral type F7Ib/II, F8II, and F8Ib/II respectively. RT Trianguli Australis is an unusual cepheid variable which shows strong absorption bands in molecular fragments of C_{2}, ⫶CH and ⋅CN, and has been classified as a carbon cepheid of spectral type R. It varies between magnitudes 9.2 and 9.97 over 1.95 days. Lying nearby Gamma, X Trianguli Australis is a variable carbon star with an average magnitude of 5.63. It has two periods of around 385 and 455 days, and is of spectral type C5, 5(Nb).

EK Trianguli Australis, a dwarf nova of the SU Ursae Majoris type, was first noticed in 1978 and officially described in 1980. It consists of a white dwarf and a donor star which orbit each other every 1.5 hours. The white dwarf sucks matter from the other star onto an accretion disc and periodically erupts, reaching magnitude 11.2 in superoutbursts, 12.1 in normal outbursts and remaining at magnitude 16.7 when quiet. NR Trianguli Australis was a slow nova which peaked at magnitude 8.4 in April 2008, before fading to magnitude 12.4 by September of that year.

=== Deep-sky objects ===
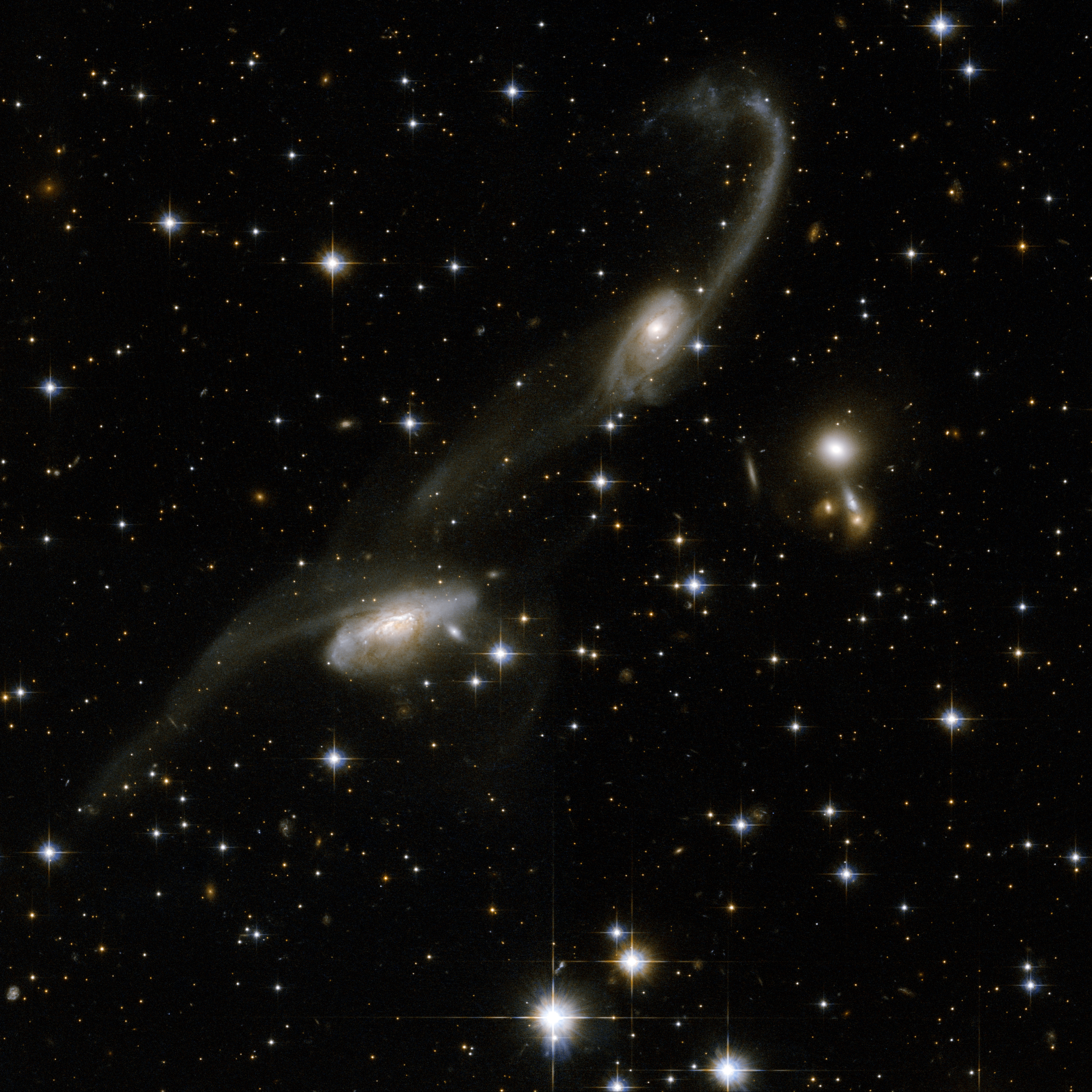
ESO 69-6, two merging galaxies with prominent long tails, photographed by the Hubble Space Telescope

Triangulum Australe has few deep-sky objects—one open cluster and a few planetary nebulae and faint galaxies. NGC 6025 is an open cluster with about 30 stars ranging from 7th to 9th magnitude. Located 3 degrees north and 1 east of Beta Trianguli Australis, it lies about 2,500 light-years (770 parsecs) away and is about 11 light-years (3.4 parsecs) in diameter. Its brightest star is MQ Trianguli Australis at apparent magnitude 7.1. NGC 5979, a planetary nebula of apparent magnitude 12.3, has a blue-green hue at higher magnifications, while Henize 2-138 is a smaller planetary nebula of magnitude 11.0. NGC 5938 is a remote spiral galaxy around 300 million light-years (90 megaparsecs) away. It is located 5 degrees south of Epsilon Trianguli Australis. ESO 69-6 is a pair of merging galaxies located about 600 million light-years (185 megaparsecs) away. Their contents have been dragged out in long tails by the interaction.

== In culture ==
Triangulum Australe appears on the flag of Brazil, symbolizing the three states of the South Region.

The movements's flag.

It also appears as the only constellation used for the flag of secessionist movement The South Is My Country.

== See also ==
- IAU-recognized constellations
- Triangulum Australe (Chinese astronomy)
