= Delta Trianguli Australis =

Luminous G-type star; Triangulum Australe

δ Trianguli Australis
- Location of δ TrA (circled)

Observation data Epoch J2000.0 Equinox ICRS
- Constellation: Triangulum Australe
- Right ascension: 16^{h} 15^{m} 26.26978^{s}
- Declination: −63° 41′ 08.4492″
- Apparent magnitude (V): 3.84±0.01

Characteristics
- Spectral type: G2 Ib-IIa
- U−B color index: +0.87
- B−V color index: +1.10

Astrometry
Radial velocity (R_{v})	−4.9±0.7 km/s
Proper motion (μ)	RA: +2.73 mas/yr Dec.: −12.92 mas/yr
Parallax (π)	5.37±0.17 mas
Distance	610 ± 20 ly (186 ± 6 pc)
Absolute magnitude (M_{V})	−2.49

Details
Mass	6.51 M_{☉}
Radius	53.6 R_{☉}
Luminosity	1,210 L_{☉}
Surface gravity (log g)	1.54 cgs
Temperature	4,705±122 K
Metallicity [Fe/H]	−0.05 dex
Rotational velocity (v sin i)	8.2±2 km/s

Other designations
- δ TrA, 25 G. Trianguli Australis, CPD−63°3854, FK5 602, GC 21819, HD 145544, HIP 79664, HR 6030, SAO 253474, WDS J16154-6341A

Database references
SIMBAD	data

Delta Trianguli Australis (Delta TrA), Latinized from δ Trianguli Australis, is a solitary, yellow-hued star in the constellation Triangulum Australe. It has an apparent magnitude of 3.84, making it readily visible to the naked eye under ideal conditions, Parallax measurements place the object at a distance of 606 light years (182 parsecs). It has a heliocentric radial velocity of −4.9 km/s, indicating that it is drifting towards the Solar System.

Delta TrA has a stellar classification of G2 Ib-IIa — an evolved G-type star with a luminosity class intermediate between a low luminosity supergiant and a bright giant. At present it has 6.5 times the mass of the Sun and has an enlarged radius of 53.6 R_{☉}. It radiates at 1,210 times the luminosity of the Sun from its photosphere at an effective temperature of 4,705 K. Delta TrA has an iron abundance 89% that of the Sun, placing it around solar metallicity. It spins modestly with a projected rotational velocity of 8.2 km/s, which is high for stars of this type.
