= Beta Trianguli Australis =

Star in the constellation Triangulum Australe

- Location of β Trianguli Australis (circled)

Observation data Epoch J2000 Equinox ICRS
- Constellation: Triangulum Australe
- Right ascension: 15^{h} 55^{m} 08.56206^{s}
- Declination: −63° 25′ 50.6155″
- Apparent magnitude (V): 2.85

Characteristics
- Spectral type: F1 V
- U−B color index: +0.05
- B−V color index: +0.29

Astrometry
Radial velocity (R_{v})	+0.4 km/s
Proper motion (μ)	RA: −188.66 mas/yr Dec.: −401.85 mas/yr
Parallax (π)	80.79±0.16 mas
Distance	40.37 ± 0.08 ly (12.38 ± 0.02 pc)
Absolute magnitude (M_{V})	+2.37

Details
Mass	1.56 M_{☉}
Radius	1.976±0.021 R_{☉}
Luminosity	9.30±0.17 L_{☉}
Surface gravity (log g)	4.219±0.066 cgs
Temperature	7,171±35 K
Metallicity [Fe/H]	−0.29±0.10 dex
Rotational velocity (v sin i)	69.63 km/s
Age	674 Myr

Other designations
- β TrA, CD−63°1135, FK5 589, GJ 601, HD 141891, HIP 77952, HR 5897, SAO 253346, LTT 6339

Database references
SIMBAD	data

Beta Trianguli Australis, Latinized from β Trianguli Australis, is a star in the southern constellation of Triangulum Australe. It has an apparent visual magnitude of +2.85, making it the second-brightest star in the constellation. It is approximately 40.37 light-years (12.38 parsecs) from Earth and has an apparent visual magnitude of +2.85. This star has a relatively high rate of proper motion across the celestial sphere.

In the indigenous Australian Wardaman culture, this star has the name Jirradella, meaning "rainbow sign".

== Characteristics ==
It is a F-type main-sequence star with a stellar classification of F1 V. It has 1.61 times the Sun's mass and 1.98 times the Sun's radius. It radiates 9.3 times the Sun's luminosity from its photosphere at an effective temperature of 7,170 K. The abundance of elements heavier than hydrogen and helium, what astronomers term metallicity, is somewhat lower than that of the Sun.

Observation with the Spitzer Space Telescope reveals what appears to be an excess infrared emission from this star. This suggests the presence of circumstellar material in this system, making it a debris disk candidate. This star may be a member of the Beta Pictoris moving group, an association of about 17 stars that share a common origin and a similar motion through space. If it is a member of this group, this would put the age of β TrA at about 12 million years; the same as the group itself.

β TrA has a nearby visual companion, the magnitude 13.2 star LTT 6333. However, it is actually a background object, with a distance of 900 light-years. This star is part of the Antaeus moving group, which likely has an extragalactic origin.

== Modern legacy ==
β TrA appears on the flag of Brazil, symbolising the state of Santa Catarina.
