= List of stars in Virgo =

This is the list of notable stars in the constellation Virgo, sorted by decreasing brightness.

Name	B	F	G.	Var	HD	HIP	RA	Dec	vis. mag.	abs. mag.	Dist. (ly)	Sp. class	Notes
Spica	α	67	144		116658	65474	13^{h} 25^{m} 11.60^{s}	−11° 09′ 40.5″	0.98	−3.55	262	B1V	Spica Virginis, Azimech, Alarph; β Cep variable
γ Vir A	γ	29	76		110379	61941	12^{h} 41^{m} 40.00^{s}	−01° 26′ 58.3″	2.74	2.38	39	F0V+...	Porrima, Antevorta, Arich; double star
ε Vir	ε	47			113226	63608	13^{h} 02^{m} 10.76^{s}	+10° 57′ 32.8″	2.85	0.37	102	G8IIIvar	Vindemiatrix, Vindemiator, Almuredin, Alaraph, Provindemiator, Protrigetrix, Protrygetor
ζ Vir	ζ	79	167		118098	66249	13^{h} 34^{m} 41.75^{s}	−00° 35′ 45.4″	3.38	1.62	73	A3V	Heze
δ Vir	δ	43	95		112300	63090	12^{h} 55^{m} 36.48^{s}	+03° 23′ 51.4″	3.39	−0.57	202	M3III	Auva, Al Awwa, Minelauva; has a planet (b)
β Vir	β	5	11		102870	57757	11^{h} 50^{m} 41.29^{s}	+01° 45′ 55.4″	3.59	3.40	36	F8V	Zavijava, Zavijah, Zavyava, Zawijah, Alaraph, Minelauva
γ Vir B	γ	29	75		110380		12^{h} 41^{m} 39.60^{s}	−01° 26′ 58.0″	3.68				component of γ Vir
109 Vir		109	259		130109	72220	14^{h} 46^{m} 14.99^{s}	+01° 53′ 34.6″	3.73	0.75	129	A0V	Maenalus
μ Vir	μ	107	255		129502	71957	14^{h} 43^{m} 03.56^{s}	−05° 39′ 26.7″	3.87	2.51	61	F2III	Rijl al Awwa
η Vir	η	15	45		107259	60129	12^{h} 19^{m} 54.39^{s}	−00° 40′ 00.3″	3.89	−0.53	250	A2IV	Zaniah
ν Vir	ν	3	7		102212	57380	11^{h} 45^{m} 51.57^{s}	+06° 31′ 47.3″	4.04	−0.87	313	M0III	
ι Vir	ι	99	228		124850	69701	14^{h} 16^{m} 00.88^{s}	−05° 59′ 58.3″	4.07	2.42	70	F7III	Syrma
ο Vir	ο	9	32		104979	58948	12^{h} 05^{m} 12.67^{s}	+08° 43′ 58.2″	4.12	0.52	171	G8III	
κ Vir	κ	98	223		124294	69427	14^{h} 12^{m} 53.74^{s}	−10° 16′ 26.6″	4.18	0.00	223	K3III	Kang
τ Vir	τ	93	206		122408	68520	14^{h} 01^{m} 38.78^{s}	+01° 32′ 40.5″	4.23	0.10	218	A3V	
θ Vir	θ	51	115		114330	64238	13^{h} 09^{m} 57.01^{s}	−05° 32′ 20.1″	4.38	−1.14	415	A1V	
110 Vir		110	268		133165	73620	15^{h} 02^{m} 54.07^{s}	+02° 05′ 28.6″	4.39	0.64	183	K0III	
λ Vir	λ	100	237		125337	69974	14^{h} 19^{m} 06.60^{s}	−13° 22′ 16.2″	4.52	0.73	187	A1V	Khambalia
π Vir	π	8	25		104321	58590	12^{h} 00^{m} 52.39^{s}	+06° 36′ 51.8″	4.65	−0.54	356	A5V	
χ Vir	χ	26	73		110014	61740	12^{h} 39^{m} 14.81^{s}	−07° 59′ 43.8″	4.66	−0.29	318	K2III	has a planet (b)
74 Vir	l	74	157		117675	66006	13^{h} 31^{m} 57.95^{s}	−06° 15′ 20.6″	4.68	−0.93	432	M3III	Apamvatsa
61 Vir		61	131		115617	64924	13^{h} 18^{m} 24.97^{s}	−18° 18′ 31.0″	4.74	5.09	28	G5V	nearby star, has three planets (b, c & d)
69 Vir		69	148		116976	65639	13^{h} 27^{m} 27.24^{s}	−15° 58′ 25.1″	4.76	0.27	258	K1IIICN...	
ψ Vir	ψ	40	93		112142	62985	12^{h} 54^{m} 21.17^{s}	−09° 32′ 20.2″	4.77	−0.76	417	M3IIIvar	
σ Vir	σ	60	130		115521	64852	13^{h} 17^{m} 36.29^{s}	+05° 28′ 11.4″	4.78	−1.32	541	M2III	
φ Vir	φ	105	246		126868	70755	14^{h} 28^{m} 12.22^{s}	−02° 13′ 40.6″	4.81	1.72	135	G2III	Elgafar
ξ Vir	ξ	2	6		102124	57328	11^{h} 45^{m} 17.00^{s}	+08° 15′ 29.4″	4.84	2.02	119	A4V	
ρ Vir	ρ	30			110411	61960	12^{h} 41^{m} 53.01^{s}	+10° 14′ 09.0″	4.88	2.04	120	A0V	δ Sct variable
78 Vir	o	78	163	CW	118022	66200	13^{h} 34^{m} 07.91^{s}	+03° 39′ 32.5″	4.92	1.17	183	A1p SrCrEu	CW Vir; α² CVn variable
ET Vir			219	ET	123934	69269	14^{h} 10^{m} 50.48^{s}	−16° 18′ 07.2″	4.93	−1.17	542	M1III	
89 Vir		89	190		120452	67494	13^{h} 49^{m} 52.34^{s}	−18° 08′ 02.7″	4.96	0.61	242	K0III	
16 Vir	c	16	46		107328	60172	12^{h} 20^{m} 21.15^{s}	+03° 18′ 45.8″	4.97	0.26	285	K1III	Yèzhě (謁者)
70 Vir		70			117176	65721	13^{h} 28^{m} 25.95^{s}	+13° 46′ 48.7″	4.97	3.68	59	G5V	has a planet (b)
CU Vir			222	CU	124224	69389	14^{h} 12^{m} 15.83^{s}	+02° 24′ 34.2″	4.99	0.47	262	B9p Si	α² CVn variable
82 Vir	m	82	173		119149	66803	13^{h} 41^{m} 36.83^{s}	−08° 42′ 11.1″	5.03	−0.70	457	M2III	
53 Vir		53	117		114642	64407	13^{h} 12^{m} 03.48^{s}	−16° 11′ 52.5″	5.04	2.48	106	F6V	
244 G. Vir			244		126248	70400	14^{h} 24^{m} 11.39^{s}	+05° 49′ 12.4″	5.10	1.77	151	A5V	
υ Vir	υ	102	238		125454	70012	14^{h} 19^{m} 32.55^{s}	−02° 15′ 55.2″	5.14	0.52	274	G9III	
49 Vir		49	109		114038	64078	13^{h} 07^{m} 53.80^{s}	−10° 44′ 25.4″	5.15	0.29	306	K2III	
90 Vir	p	90	198		121299	67929	13^{h} 54^{m} 42.20^{s}	−01° 30′ 11.1″	5.16	0.70	254	K2III	
59 Vir	e	59			115383	64792	13^{h} 16^{m} 46.71^{s}	+09° 25′ 25.3″	5.19	3.92	59	G0Vs	has a planet (b)
57 Vir		57	124		115202	64725	13^{h} 15^{m} 58.58^{s}	−19° 56′ 34.2″	5.21	2.26	127	K1III	
76 Vir	h	76	159		117818	66098	13^{h} 32^{m} 58.09^{s}	−10° 09′ 53.7″	5.21	0.67	264	K0III	
d^{2} Vir	d^{2}	32	82	FM	110951	62267	12^{h} 45^{m} 37.12^{s}	+07° 40′ 23.9″	5.22	0.85	244	A8m	FM Vir
ω Vir	ω	1	2		101153	56779	11^{h} 38^{m} 27.61^{s}	+08° 08′ 03.4″	5.24	−0.60	479	M4III	
68 Vir	i	68	147		116870	65581	13^{h} 26^{m} 43.24^{s}	−12° 42′ 27.4″	5.27	−0.68	505	K5III	
4 Vir	A^{1}	4	8		102510	57562	11^{h} 47^{m} 54.93^{s}	+08° 14′ 45.1″	5.31	1.46	192	A1	
55 Vir		55	120		114946	64577	13^{h} 14^{m} 10.97^{s}	−19° 55′ 52.8″	5.31	2.38	126	G8III/IV	
					115478	64823	13^{h} 17^{m} 15.62^{s}	+13° 40′ 32.3″	5.33	0.53	298	K3III	
84 Vir		84	175		119425	66936	13^{h} 43^{m} 03.88^{s}	+03° 32′ 17.1″	5.35	1.23	217	K1III	
7 Vir	b	7	23		104181	58510	11^{h} 59^{m} 56.92^{s}	+03° 39′ 18.8″	5.36	0.72	276	A1V	
63 Vir		63	139		116292	65301	13^{h} 23^{m} 01.15^{s}	−17° 44′ 06.7″	5.36	0.40	320	K0III	
87 Vir		87	184		120052	67288	13^{h} 47^{m} 25.35^{s}	−17° 51′ 35.1″	5.41	−1.04	635	M2III	
106 Vir		106	247		126927	70794	14^{h} 28^{m} 41.73^{s}	−06° 54′ 01.5″	5.42	−0.41	479	K5III	
95 Vir		95	217		123255	68940	14^{h} 06^{m} 42.91^{s}	−09° 18′ 48.7″	5.46	1.76	179	F2IV	
21 Vir	q	21	59		109309	61318	12^{h} 33^{m} 46.80^{s}	−09° 27′ 07.5″	5.48	0.96	261	A0V	
86 Vir		86	180		119853	67172	13^{h} 45^{m} 56.33^{s}	−12° 25′ 35.6″	5.50	0.17	379	G8III	
1 Ser	(M)	(1)	264		132132	73193	14^{h} 57^{m} 33.22^{s}	−00° 10′ 03.2″	5.51	0.73	295	K1III	264 G. Vir
75 Vir		75	158		117789	66091	13^{h} 32^{m} 51.69^{s}	−15° 21′ 46.8″	5.52	−1.01	660	K1III	
226 G. Vir			226		124683	69658	14^{h} 15^{m} 24.11^{s}	−18° 12′ 02.4″	5.53	1.01	261	A0V	
HD 104304			24		104304	58576	12^{h} 00^{m} 44.37^{s}	−10° 26′ 41.4″	5.54	4.99	42	K0IV	has a red dwarf companion (B)
83 Vir		83	178		119605	67057	13^{h} 44^{m} 29.82^{s}	−16° 10′ 44.6″	5.55	−1.34	780	G1IV/V	
31 Vir	d^{1}	31	78		110423	61968	12^{h} 41^{m} 57.16^{s}	+06° 48′ 23.9″	5.57	1.20	244	A2V	
g Vir	g		110		114113	64122	13^{h} 08^{m} 32.49^{s}	−08° 59′ 03.2″	5.57	0.29	371	K3III	
6 Vir	A^{2}	6	14		103484	58110	11^{h} 55^{m} 03.15^{s}	+08° 26′ 38.1″	5.58	2.02	168	K0III:	
106 G. Vir			106		113415	63738	13^{h} 03^{m} 46.03^{s}	−20° 35′ 00.6″	5.58	3.29	93	F7V	
12 G. Vir			12		102928	57791	11^{h} 51^{m} 02.23^{s}	−05° 20′ 00.0″	5.62	1.12	216	K0+IIIb:	Spectroscopic binary
LN Vir				LN	115046	64607	13^{h} 14^{m} 31.24^{s}	+11° 19′ 54.4″	5.64	−0.32	507	M0III	
33 Vir		33			111028	62325	12^{h} 46^{m} 22.38^{s}	+09° 32′ 26.8″	5.65	2.40	146	K1III-IV	
71 Vir		71			117304	65790	13^{h} 29^{m} 13.04^{s}	+10° 49′ 06.2″	5.65	1.04	272	K0III	
FW Vir			69	FW	109896	61658	12^{h} 38^{m} 22.45^{s}	+01° 51′ 16.9″	5.68	−0.25	501	M3III	
108 Vir		108	258		129956	72154	14^{h} 45^{m} 30.23^{s}	+00° 43′ 02.2″	5.68	−0.69	614	B9.5V	
136 G. Vir			136		116160	65198	13^{h} 21^{m} 41.68^{s}	+02° 05′ 14.5″	5.69	1.62	213	A2V	
80 Vir		80	169		118219	66320	13^{h} 35^{m} 31.29^{s}	−05° 23′ 47.0″	5.70	0.42	370	G6III	
2 Ser		(2)	267		132933	73536	15^{h} 01^{m} 48.92^{s}	−00° 08′ 24.9″	5.71	−1.77	1022	M2III	267 G. Vir
11 Vir		11	35		105702	59309	12^{h} 10^{m} 03.51^{s}	+05° 48′ 25.1″	5.72	2.51	143	Am	
					114780	64445	13^{h} 12^{m} 32.95^{s}	+11° 33′ 22.2″	5.76	−1.22	811	M0III	
66 Vir		66	143		116568	65420	13^{h} 24^{m} 33.14^{s}	−05° 09′ 50.1″	5.76	3.37	98	F3V	
44 Vir	k	44	104		112846	63414	12^{h} 59^{m} 39.55^{s}	−03° 48′ 43.0″	5.79	0.99	298	A3V	
					114256	64179	13^{h} 09^{m} 12.42^{s}	+10° 01′ 20.9″	5.79	0.63	352	K0III	
12 Vir		12			106251	59608	12^{h} 13^{m} 25.99^{s}	+10° 15′ 44.5″	5.85	2.37	162	A2m	
CS Vir			236	CS	125248	69929	14^{h} 18^{m} 38.30^{s}	−18° 42′ 57.2″	5.86	1.08	294	Ap Si(Cr)	variable star
25 Vir	f	25	63		109704	61558	12^{h} 36^{m} 47.37^{s}	−05° 49′ 54.7″	5.88	1.69	224	A3V	
65 Vir		65	140		116365	65323	13^{h} 23^{m} 18.91^{s}	−04° 55′ 27.8″	5.88	−1.88	1160	K3III	
64 Vir		64	137		116235	65241	13^{h} 22^{m} 09.73^{s}	+05° 09′ 17.5″	5.89	1.87	208	A2m	
224 G. Vir			224		124425	69493	14^{h} 13^{m} 40.67^{s}	−00° 50′ 42.4″	5.90	2.16	181	F7Vw	Spectroscopic binary, 2.7d
13 Vir		13	43		107070	60030	12^{h} 18^{m} 40.30^{s}	−00° 47′ 13.7″	5.90	0.90	326	A5Vn	
92 Vir		92	202		121607	68092	13^{h} 56^{m} 27.89^{s}	+01° 03′ 02.0″	5.90	0.82	337	A8V	
79 G. Vir			79		110646	62103	12^{h} 43^{m} 38.02^{s}	−01° 34′ 36.5″	5.91	1.68	229	G8IIIp	
265 G. Vir			265		132525	73350	14^{h} 59^{m} 23.11^{s}	+04° 34′ 04.0″	5.91	−0.82	724	M1III	
y Vir	y		165		118054	66247	13^{h} 34^{m} 40.48^{s}	−13° 12′ 51.5″	5.92	−0.04	507	A0V	
10 Vir		10	34		105639	59285	12^{h} 09^{m} 41.29^{s}	+01° 53′ 54.0″	5.95	1.34	273	K3III	
50 G. Vir			50		108107	60595	12^{h} 25^{m} 11.80^{s}	−11° 36′ 37.8″	5.95	1.90	210	A1V	
50 Vir		50	114		114287	64224	13^{h} 09^{m} 45.29^{s}	−10° 19′ 45.5″	5.95	−0.57	656	K5III	
250 G. Vir			250		127167	70894	14^{h} 29^{m} 50.51^{s}	+00° 49′ 44.1″	5.96	1.55	249	A5IV	
146 G. Vir			146		116831	65545	13^{h} 26^{m} 11.48^{s}	−01° 11′ 32.9″	5.97	1.59	245	A7III	
46 Vir		46	105		112992	63494	13^{h} 00^{m} 35.96^{s}	−03° 22′ 07.0″	5.99	0.87	344	K2III	
92 G. Vir			92		112131	62983	12^{h} 54^{m} 18.74^{s}	−11° 38′ 54.9″	6.00	1.88	218	A2V	
194 G. Vir			194		120602	67545	13^{h} 50^{m} 24.67^{s}	+05° 29′ 50.0″	6.00	0.54	403	K0	
73 Vir		73	156	HX	117661	66015	13^{h} 32^{m} 02.87^{s}	−18° 43′ 43.8″	6.01	1.73	234	A7IV/V	HX Vir; δ Sct variable
252 G. Vir			252		127337	70949	14^{h} 30^{m} 45.39^{s}	+04° 46′ 20.3″	6.01	−1.59	1079	K4III	
37 Vir		37	89		111765	62757	12^{h} 51^{m} 36.91^{s}	+03° 03′ 24.3″	6.02	−0.24	582	K4III:	
183 G. Vir			183		120033	67271	13^{h} 47^{m} 13.40^{s}	−09° 42′ 33.7″	6.04	0.06	512	K5III	
5 G. Vir			5		101933	57214	11^{h} 43^{m} 55.09^{s}	−06° 40′ 37.4″	6.05	0.69	385	G8III:	
56 G. Vir			56		108985	61103	12^{h} 31^{m} 21.43^{s}	+07° 36′ 15.4″	6.05	−0.89	795	K5	
257 G. Vir			257		129902	72122	14^{h} 45^{m} 11.74^{s}	−01° 25′ 03.1″	6.06	0.08	511	M1III	
72 Vir		72	154		117436	65892	13^{h} 30^{m} 25.70^{s}	−06° 28′ 13.1″	6.10	2.43	177	F2V	
41 G. Vir			41		106516	59750	12^{h} 15^{m} 10.54^{s}	−10° 18′ 35.8″	6.11	4.34	74	F5V	
34 Vir		34			111164	62394	12^{h} 47^{m} 13.62^{s}	+11° 57′ 29.3″	6.11	1.75	243	A3V	
38 Vir		38	90		111998	62875	12^{h} 53^{m} 11.31^{s}	−03° 33′ 11.1″	6.11	3.55	106	F5V	has a planet (b)
9 G. Vir			9		102634	57629	11^{h} 49^{m} 01.40^{s}	−00° 19′ 07.2″	6.15	3.48	111	F7V	
230 G. Vir			230		124931	69747	14^{h} 16^{m} 30.18^{s}	−03° 11′ 46.4″	6.15	0.05	542	A1V	
271 G. Vir			271		134047	74026	15^{h} 07^{m} 40.32^{s}	+05° 29′ 53.1″	6.16	0.09	534	K0III	
1 G. Vir			1		101112	56756	11^{h} 38^{m} 09.87^{s}	+08° 53′ 01.6″	6.18	0.89	373	K1III	
19 G. Vir			19		104055	58445	11^{h} 59^{m} 03.38^{s}	+00° 31′ 50.2″	6.18	−0.13	597	K2IV	
153 G. Vir			153		117404	65862	13^{h} 30^{m} 00.08^{s}	+07° 10′ 43.8″	6.18	−0.78	803	K5	
85 Vir		85	179		119786	67139	13^{h} 45^{m} 35.09^{s}	−15° 46′ 02.7″	6.18	1.10	339	A0V	
239 G. Vir			239		125489	70022	14^{h} 19^{m} 40.97^{s}	+00° 23′ 03.7″	6.18	1.96	228	A7V	
104 Vir		104	245		126722	70680	14^{h} 27^{m} 24.42^{s}	−06° 07′ 12.7″	6.18	1.88	236	A2IV	
261 G. Vir			261		130970	72629	14^{h} 51^{m} 00.11^{s}	−00° 15′ 27.0″	6.18	0.46	454	K3III	
57 G. Vir			57		109014	61134	12^{h} 31^{m} 38.74^{s}	−05° 03′ 09.6″	6.19	0.74	402	G9III:	
199 G. Vir			199		121325	67953	13^{h} 54^{m} 58.30^{s}	−08° 03′ 31.6″	6.19	3.54	110	F8V+...	
135 G. Vir			135		116061	65183	13^{h} 21^{m} 29.82^{s}	−19° 29′ 21.4″	6.21	1.47	289	A2/A3V	
3 G. Vir			3		101154	56775	11^{h} 38^{m} 24.09^{s}	−02° 26′ 09.4″	6.22	0.93	373	G9III	
27 Vir		27		GG	110377	61937	12^{h} 41^{m} 34.46^{s}	+10° 25′ 34.6″	6.22	2.04	223	A7Vn	GG Vir; δ Sct variable
231 G. Vir			231		124990	69792	14^{h} 17^{m} 03.79^{s}	−18° 35′ 08.5″	6.22	0.87	382	K0III	
FT Vir			52	FT	108506	60813	12^{h} 27^{m} 51.60^{s}	−04° 36′ 55.0″	6.23	1.42	299	F2III	δ Sct variable
27 G. Vir			27		104625	58741	12^{h} 02^{m} 51.68^{s}	−07° 41′ 01.2″	6.24	−0.45	710	K5	
209 G. Vir			209		122797	68707	14^{h} 03^{m} 55.76^{s}	+04° 54′ 03.5″	6.24	2.25	205	F4V	
41 Vir		41			112097	62933	12^{h} 53^{m} 49.67^{s}	+12° 25′ 06.6″	6.25	2.32	199	A7III	
243 G. Vir			243		126053	70319	14^{h} 23^{m} 15.15^{s}	+01° 14′ 33.8″	6.25	5.02	57	G1V	
54 Vir		54	118	LM	114846	64520	13^{h} 13^{m} 26.85^{s}	−18° 49′ 35.0″	6.26	−1.73	1294	A0V	LM Vir
134 G. Vir			134		115995	65119	13^{h} 20^{m} 41.61^{s}	+02° 56′ 32.3″	6.26	0.77	409	A3V	
85 G. Vir			85		111199	62421	12^{h} 47^{m} 33.42^{s}	−06° 18′ 05.9″	6.27	2.16	216	F7V	
213 G. Vir			213		122910	68776	14^{h} 04^{m} 37.45^{s}	+02° 17′ 51.1″	6.28	0.85	398	K0	
20 Vir		20			109217	61246	12^{h} 33^{m} 02.91^{s}	+10° 17′ 44.4″	6.29	0.49	471	G8III	
208 G. Vir			208		122703	68705	14^{h} 03^{m} 53.10^{s}	−22° 25′ 17.8″	6.30	1.86	252	F3IV	
IQ Vir			13	IQ	103313	58002	11^{h} 53^{m} 50.30^{s}	+00° 33′ 07.6″	6.31	0.71	430	F0V	δ Sct variable
EP Vir			83	EP	111133	62376	12^{h} 47^{m} 02.29^{s}	+05° 57′ 01.8″	6.31	0.28	523	A0spe...	α² CVn variable
26 G. Vir			26		104356	58603	12^{h} 01^{m} 01.75^{s}	−01° 46′ 04.8″	6.32	−0.05	614	G8III:	
112 G. Vir			112		114203	64181	13^{h} 09^{m} 14.27^{s}	−09° 32′ 17.2″	6.32	0.86	403	K0	
207 G. Vir			207		122577	68643	14^{h} 03^{m} 04.18^{s}	−17° 22′ 01.2″	6.32	0.46	484	K2/K3III	
68 G. Vir			68		109860	61637	12^{h} 38^{m} 04.43^{s}	+03° 16′ 56.9″	6.33	−0.17	649	A1V	
98 G. Vir			98		112495	63220	12^{h} 57^{m} 12.68^{s}	−12° 04′ 00.9″	6.33	−0.14	643	K5	
185 G. Vir			185		120066	67246	13^{h} 46^{m} 57.42^{s}	+06° 21′ 02.3″	6.33	3.90	100	G0V	
210 G. Vir			210		122837	68763	14^{h} 04^{m} 27.00^{s}	−14° 58′ 18.0″	6.35	0.54	472	K1III+...	
51 G. Vir			51		108471	60804	12^{h} 27^{m} 42.07^{s}	+08° 36′ 37.3″	6.36	−0.35	718	G8III	
129 G. Vir			129		115488	64838	13^{h} 17^{m} 29.89^{s}	−00° 40′ 33.7″	6.36	2.00	242	F0V	
204 G. Vir			204		122106	68380	13^{h} 59^{m} 49.30^{s}	−03° 32′ 58.7″	6.36	1.91	253	F8V	
225 G. Vir			225		124553	69564	14^{h} 14^{m} 21.49^{s}	−05° 56′ 52.5″	6.36	3.27	135	F9V	
33 G. Vir			33		105089	59010	12^{h} 05^{m} 59.83^{s}	−03° 07′ 53.6″	6.37	0.45	498	G8III:	
29 G. Vir			29		104755	58809	12^{h} 03^{m} 44.53^{s}	+05° 33′ 28.6″	6.39	2.32	213	F5	
211 G. Vir			211		122815	68739	14^{h} 04^{m} 14.57^{s}	−05° 22′ 53.0″	6.39	1.61	295	K0	
FS Vir			227	FS	124681	69614	14^{h} 14^{m} 53.05^{s}	+03° 20′ 09.4″	6.41	−0.57	813	M4III	
35 Vir		35	86		111239	62443	12^{h} 47^{m} 51.42^{s}	+03° 34′ 21.8″	6.42	0.19	574	M4III	
150 G. Vir			150		117267	65796	13^{h} 29^{m} 14.94^{s}	−01° 21′ 51.4″	6.42	0.58	479	K0III	
221 G. Vir			221		124115	69340	14^{h} 11^{m} 31.28^{s}	+01° 21′ 44.4″	6.42	3.11	150	F7V	
240 G. Vir			240		125490	70038	14^{h} 19^{m} 53.25^{s}	−06° 44′ 46.0″	6.42	1.59	301	G5	
141 G. Vir			141		116429	65381	13^{h} 23^{m} 57.11^{s}	−20° 55′ 28.3″	6.44	0.63	472	K1/K2III/IV	
					116594	65417	13^{h} 24^{m} 30.54^{s}	+12° 25′ 54.3″	6.44	0.35	538	K0III	
229 G. Vir			229		124915	69727	14^{h} 16^{m} 21.41^{s}	−06° 37′ 17.5″	6.44	2.86	170	A9III	
91 G. Vir			91		112048	62915	12^{h} 53^{m} 38.12^{s}	−04° 13′ 28.2″	6.45	1.36	339	K0	
96 Vir		96	218		123630	69127	14^{h} 09^{m} 00.60^{s}	−10° 20′ 04.6″	6.45	0.30	554	G8III	
254 G. Vir			254		128563	71510	14^{h} 37^{m} 28.49^{s}	+02° 16′ 38.7″	6.45	1.69	292	F8	
17 Vir		17	47		107705	60353	12^{h} 22^{m} 32.14^{s}	+05° 18′ 20.1″	6.46	4.09	97	F8V	
49 G. Vir			49		107794	60418	12^{h} 23^{m} 15.35^{s}	−04° 58′ 28.0″	6.47	0.75	455	K0	
233 G. Vir			233		124973	69773	14^{h} 16^{m} 48.75^{s}	−08° 53′ 04.0″	6.47	0.41	532	K0	
235 G. Vir			235		125184	69881	14^{h} 18^{m} 00.57^{s}	−07° 32′ 30.5″	6.47	3.89	107	F9V	
88 G. Vir			88		111720	62743	12^{h} 51^{m} 22.93^{s}	−10° 20′ 17.6″	6.48	1.11	386	G8III	
					118266	66326	13^{h} 35^{m} 33.37^{s}	+10° 12′ 18.3″	6.48	1.46	329	K1III+...	
20 G. Vir			20		104078	58450	11^{h} 59^{m} 09.38^{s}	−10° 28′ 33.5″	6.49	−0.62	860	K2	
94 Vir		94	215		123177	68888	14^{h} 06^{m} 17.77^{s}	−08° 53′ 30.0″	6.54	1.37	352	A0	
48 Vir		48	107		113459	63750	13^{h} 03^{m} 54.44^{s}	−03° 39′ 47.0″	6.62	1.14	408	F0V	
S Vir			160	S	117833	66100	13^{h} 33^{m} 00.70^{s}	−07° 11′ 42.0″	6.68				variable star
62 Vir		62	133		115903	65074	13^{h} 20^{m} 20.05^{s}	−11° 18′ 14.8″	6.73	1.17	422	K0	
28 Vir		28	77		110418	61969	12^{h} 41^{m} 57.68^{s}	−07° 30′ 00.7″	6.81	−0.64	1006	K5	
56 Vir		56	122		115062	64625	13^{h} 14^{m} 45.13^{s}	−10° 22′ 13.0″	6.95	0.41	661	K5	
77 Vir		77	161		117878	66131	13^{h} 33^{m} 24.56^{s}	−07° 37′ 21.4″	7.02	2.64	245	F0	
R Vir			70	R	109914	61667	12^{h} 38^{m} 30.00^{s}	+06° 59′ 18.0″	7.08	−2.19	2326	M4.5IIIe	variable star
HD 106515 A					106515	59743	12^{h} 15^{m} 07^{s}	−07° 15′ 26″	7.35	4.61	115	G5	has a planet (b)
HD 106252					106252	59610	12^{h} 13^{m} 29.51^{s}	+10° 02′ 29.9″	7.36	4.49	122	G0V	has a planet (b)
HD 114783					114783	64457	13^{h} 12^{m} 43.79^{s}	−02° 15′ 54.1″	7.57	6.02	67	K0	has two planets (b & c)
HD 106270					106270	59625	12^{h} 13^{m} 37^{s}	−09° 30′ 48″	7.73	3.08	277	G5	has a planet (b)
HD 107148					107148	60081	12^{h} 19^{m} 13.49^{s}	−03° 19′ 11.2″	8.02	4.47	167	G5	has two planets (b & c)
HD 102329					102329	57467	11^{h} 46^{m} 47^{s}	+03° 28′ 27″	8.04	2.05	515		has two planets (b & c)
HD 130322					130322	72339	14^{h} 47^{m} 32.73^{s}	−00° 16′ 53.3″	8.05	5.68	97	K0III	Mönch; has a planet (b)
HD 109271					109271	61300	12^{h} 33^{m} 36.0^{s}	−11° 37′ 19″	8.05	4.09	202	G5V	has two confirmed planets (b & c) and one unconfirmed planet (d)
HD 102195					102195	57370	11^{h} 45^{m} 42.29^{s}	+02° 49′ 17.3″	8.06	5.75	95	K0	Flegetonte; has a planet (b)
HD 125612					125612	70123	14^{h} 20^{m} 53.51^{s}	−17° 28′ 53.5″	8.33	4.72	172	G3V	has three planets (b, c & d)
HD 126614					126614	70623	14^{h} 26^{m} 48.28^{s}	−05° 10′ 40.0″	8.81	4.51	236	K0	multiple star; has a planet (b)
HD 106315					106315		12^{h} 13^{m} 53.0^{s}	−00° 23′ 37″	9		350	F5V	has two planets (b & c)
EQ Vir				EQ	118100	66252	13^{h} 34^{m} 43.21^{s}	−08° 20′ 31.3″	9.31	7.83	65	K5V	nearby flare star
DT Vir				DT		63510	13^{h} 00^{m} 46.58^{s}	+12° 22′ 32.6″	9.72	9.44	37	M0.5V	nearby variable star, has a circumbinary planet (c)
HD 119130					119130		13^{h} 41^{m} 30.0^{s}	−09° 56′ 46″	9.9		373	G3V	has a planet (b)
WASP-54							13^{h} 41^{m} 49.03^{s}	−00° 07′ 41.0″	10.42				has a transiting planet (b)
HW Vir				HW		62157	12^{h} 44^{m} 20.24^{s}	−08° 40′ 16.8″	10.9	4.6	590	sdB+MV	eclipsing binary of Algol type; unconfirmed evidence for a substellar companion
Ross 128						57548	11^{h} 47^{m} 44.40^{s}	+00° 48′ 16.4″	11.13	13.51	10.89	M4V	FI Vir; 11th closest star system, flare star; has a planet (b)
WASP-85							11^{h} 43^{m} 38.0^{s}	+06° 33′ 49″	11.2			G8	has a transiting planet (b)
WASP-16							14^{h} 18^{m} 43.92^{s}	−20° 16′ 31.8″	11.29			G3V	has a transiting planet (b)
WASP-24							15^{h} 08^{m} 51.74^{s}	+02° 20′ 36.0″	11.35	3.78	1062	F8–9	has a transiting planet (b)
WASP-107							12^{h} 33^{m} 33.0^{s}	−10° 08′ 46″	11.60			K6	has a transiting planet (b) and a non-transiting planet (c)
HAT-P-26							14^{h} 12^{m} 37.55^{s}	+04° 03′ 36.13″	11.74	6.1	437	K1	has a transiting planet (b)
WASP-55							13^{h} 35^{m} 02.0^{s}	−17° 30′ 13″	11.8	4.21	1076	G1	has a transiting planet (b)
WASP-39							14^{h} 29^{m} 18^{s}	−03° 26′ 40″	12.11	5.3	750	G8	Malmok, has a transiting planet (b)
HAT-P-27							14^{h} 51^{m} 04.25^{s}	+05° 56′ 50.4″	12.21	5.66	665	G8	WASP-40; has a transiting planet (b)
FL Vir				FL			12^{h} 33^{m} 17.38^{s}	+09° 01′ 15.8″	12.50	14.28	14.4	M5V	flare star
WASP-37							14^{h} 47^{m} 47^{s}	+01° 03′ 54″	12.7	5.06	1102	G2	has a transiting planet (b)
WASP-157							13^{h} 26^{m} 37.0^{s}	−08° 19′ 03″	12.9			G2V	has a transiting planet (b)
Wolf 424							12^{h} 30^{m} 17.2^{s}	+09° 01′ 15″	13.18	14.97	14.3	M5.5V	nearby binary star, flare star
QS Vir				QS			13^{h} 49^{m} 51.95^{s}	−13° 13′ 37.5″	14.80	11.39	156	DA+dme	eclipsing binary
PSR B1257+12							13^{h} 00^{m} 01^{s}	+12° 40′ 57″			980	neutron star	Lich, millisecond pulsar, has 3 planets (Draugr, Poltergeist, & Phobetor)
Table legend: • Name = Proper name • B = Bayer designation • F or/and G. = Flamsteed designation or Gould designation • Var = Variable-star designation • HD = Henry Draper Catalogue designation number • HIP = Hipparcos Catalogue designation number • RA = Right ascension for the Epoch/Equinox J2000.0 • Dec = Declination for the Epoch/Equinox J2000.0 • vis. mag. = visual magnitude (m or m_{v}), also known as apparent magnitude • abs. mag. = absolute magnitude (M_{v}) • Dist. (ly) = Distance in light-years from Earth • Sp. class = Spectral class of the star in the stellar classification system • Notes = Common name(s) or alternate name(s); comments; notable properties [for example: multiple star status, range of variability if it is a variable star, exoplanets, etc.]

== See also ==
- Lists of stars
