= Virgo in Chinese astronomy =

The modern constellation Virgo lies across one of the quadrants symbolized by the Azure Dragon of the East (東方青龍, Dōng Fāng Qīng Lóng), and Three Enclosures (三垣, Sān Yuán), that divide the sky in traditional Chinese uranography.

The name of the western constellation in modern Chinese is 室女座 (shì nǚ zuò), which means "the virgin constellation".

== Stars ==
The map of Chinese constellation in constellation Virgo area consists of :

Enclosures	Enclosure (Chinese name)	Romanization	Translation	Asterisms (Chinese name)	Romanization	Translation	Western star name	Proper Name	Chinese star name	Romanization	Translation
Three Enclosures (三垣)	太微垣	Tài Wēi Yuán	Supreme Palace enclosure	左微左垣	Tàiwēizuǒyuán	Left Wall					
Three Enclosures (三垣)	太微垣	Tài Wēi Yuán	Supreme Palace enclosure	左微左垣	Tàiwēizuǒyuán	Left Wall	η Vir	Zaniah (for component Aa)			
Three Enclosures (三垣)	太微垣	Tài Wēi Yuán	Supreme Palace enclosure	左微左垣	Tàiwēizuǒyuán	Left Wall	η Vir	Zaniah (for component Aa)	太微左垣一	Tàiwēizuǒyuányī	1st star
Three Enclosures (三垣)	太微垣	Tài Wēi Yuán	Supreme Palace enclosure	左微左垣	Tàiwēizuǒyuán	Left Wall	η Vir	Zaniah (for component Aa)	左執法	Zuǒzhífǎ	The Left Law Administrator
Three Enclosures (三垣)	太微垣	Tài Wēi Yuán	Supreme Palace enclosure	左微左垣	Tàiwēizuǒyuán	Left Wall	η Vir	Zaniah (for component Aa)	廷尉	Tíngwèi	Commandant of Justice in Imperial China, one of the Nine Ministers
Three Enclosures (三垣)	太微垣	Tài Wēi Yuán	Supreme Palace enclosure	左微左垣	Tàiwēizuǒyuán	Left Wall	γ Vir	Porrima			
Three Enclosures (三垣)	太微垣	Tài Wēi Yuán	Supreme Palace enclosure	左微左垣	Tàiwēizuǒyuán	Left Wall	γ Vir	Porrima	太微左垣二	Tàiwēizuǒyuánèr	2nd star
Three Enclosures (三垣)	太微垣	Tài Wēi Yuán	Supreme Palace enclosure	左微左垣	Tàiwēizuǒyuán	Left Wall	γ Vir	Porrima	東上相	Dōngshàngxiàng	The First Eastern Minister
Three Enclosures (三垣)	太微垣	Tài Wēi Yuán	Supreme Palace enclosure	左微左垣	Tàiwēizuǒyuán	Left Wall	γ Vir	Porrima	東太阳門	Dōngtàiyángmén	First gate in the east
Three Enclosures (三垣)	太微垣	Tài Wēi Yuán	Supreme Palace enclosure	左微左垣	Tàiwēizuǒyuán	Left Wall	δ Vir	Minelauva			
Three Enclosures (三垣)	太微垣	Tài Wēi Yuán	Supreme Palace enclosure	左微左垣	Tàiwēizuǒyuán	Left Wall	δ Vir	Minelauva	太微左垣三	Tàiwēizuǒyuánsān	3rd star
Three Enclosures (三垣)	太微垣	Tài Wēi Yuán	Supreme Palace enclosure	左微左垣	Tàiwēizuǒyuán	Left Wall	δ Vir	Minelauva	東次相	Dōngcìxiàng	The Second Eastern Minister
Three Enclosures (三垣)	太微垣	Tài Wēi Yuán	Supreme Palace enclosure	左微左垣	Tàiwēizuǒyuán	Left Wall	δ Vir	Minelauva	中华东門	Zhōnghuádōngmén	Middle gate in the east
Three Enclosures (三垣)	太微垣	Tài Wēi Yuán	Supreme Palace enclosure	左微左垣	Tàiwēizuǒyuán	Left Wall	ε Vir	Vindemiatrix			
Three Enclosures (三垣)	太微垣	Tài Wēi Yuán	Supreme Palace enclosure	左微左垣	Tàiwēizuǒyuán	Left Wall	ε Vir	Vindemiatrix	太微左垣四	Tàiwēizuǒyuánsì	4th star
Three Enclosures (三垣)	太微垣	Tài Wēi Yuán	Supreme Palace enclosure	左微左垣	Tàiwēizuǒyuán	Left Wall	ε Vir	Vindemiatrix	東次將	Dōngcìjiàng	The Second Eastern General
Three Enclosures (三垣)	太微垣	Tài Wēi Yuán	Supreme Palace enclosure	左微左垣	Tàiwēizuǒyuán	Left Wall	ε Vir	Vindemiatrix	東太阴門	Dōngtàiyīnmén	Final gate in the east
Three Enclosures (三垣)	太微垣	Tài Wēi Yuán	Supreme Palace enclosure	左微左垣	Tàiwēizuǒyuán	Left Wall	13 Vir		左执法增一	Zuǒzhífǎzēngyī	1st additional star of The Left Law Administrator
Three Enclosures (三垣)	太微垣	Tài Wēi Yuán	Supreme Palace enclosure	左微左垣	Tàiwēizuǒyuán	Left Wall	37 Vir		東次相增一	Dōngcìxiàngzēngyī	1st additional star of The Second Eastern Minister
Three Enclosures (三垣)	太微垣	Tài Wēi Yuán	Supreme Palace enclosure	左微左垣	Tàiwēizuǒyuán	Left Wall	41 Vir		東次将增一	Dōngcìjiàngzēngyī	1st additional star of The Second Eastern General
Three Enclosures (三垣)	太微垣	Tài Wēi Yuán	Supreme Palace enclosure	左微左垣	Tàiwēizuǒyuán	Left Wall	59 Vir		東次将增三	Dōngcìjiàngzēngsān	3rd additional star of The Second Eastern General
Three Enclosures (三垣)	太微垣	Tài Wēi Yuán	Supreme Palace enclosure	左微左垣	Tàiwēizuǒyuán	Left Wall	70 Vir		東上将增一	Dōngshàng jiàngzēngyī	1st additional star of The First Eastern General
Three Enclosures (三垣)	太微垣	Tài Wēi Yuán	Supreme Palace enclosure	左微左垣	Tàiwēizuǒyuán	Left Wall	71 Vir		東上将增二	Dōngshàng jiàngzēngèr	2nd additional star of The First Eastern General
Three Enclosures (三垣)	太微垣	Tài Wēi Yuán	Supreme Palace enclosure	太微右垣	Tàiwēiyòuyuán	Right Wall					
Three Enclosures (三垣)	太微垣	Tài Wēi Yuán	Supreme Palace enclosure	太微右垣	Tàiwēiyòuyuán	Right Wall	β Vir	Zavijava			
Three Enclosures (三垣)	太微垣	Tài Wēi Yuán	Supreme Palace enclosure	太微右垣	Tàiwēiyòuyuán	Right Wall	β Vir	Zavijava	太微右垣一	Tàiwēiyòuyuányī	1st star
Three Enclosures (三垣)	太微垣	Tài Wēi Yuán	Supreme Palace enclosure	太微右垣	Tàiwēiyòuyuán	Right Wall	β Vir	Zavijava	右執法	Yòuzhífǎ	The Right Law Administrator
Three Enclosures (三垣)	太微垣	Tài Wēi Yuán	Supreme Palace enclosure	太微右垣	Tàiwēiyòuyuán	Right Wall	β Vir	Zavijava	御史大夫	Yùshǐdàifu	Imperial censor and minister of state
Three Enclosures (三垣)	太微垣	Tài Wēi Yuán	Supreme Palace enclosure	太微右垣	Tàiwēiyòuyuán	Right Wall	β Vir	Zavijava	司怪南星	Sīguàinánxīng	Star in the south of Deity in Charge of Monsters
Three Enclosures (三垣)	太微垣	Tài Wēi Yuán	Supreme Palace enclosure	謁者	Yèzhě	Usher to the Court					
Three Enclosures (三垣)	太微垣	Tài Wēi Yuán	Supreme Palace enclosure	謁者	Yèzhě	Usher to the Court	16 Vir		謁者	Yèzhě	(One star of)
Three Enclosures (三垣)	太微垣	Tài Wēi Yuán	Supreme Palace enclosure	謁者	Yèzhě	Usher to the Court	10 Vir		謁者增一	Yèzhězēngyī	1st additional star
Three Enclosures (三垣)	太微垣	Tài Wēi Yuán	Supreme Palace enclosure	謁者	Yèzhě	Usher to the Court	17 Vir		謁者增二	Yèzhězēngèr	2nd additional star
Three Enclosures (三垣)	太微垣	Tài Wēi Yuán	Supreme Palace enclosure	三公	Sāngōng	Three Excellencies					
Three Enclosures (三垣)	太微垣	Tài Wēi Yuán	Supreme Palace enclosure	三公	Sāngōng	Three Excellencies	31 Vir		三公二	Sāngōngèr	2nd star
Three Enclosures (三垣)	太微垣	Tài Wēi Yuán	Supreme Palace enclosure	三公	Sāngōng	Three Excellencies	35 Vir		三公三	Sāngōngsān	3rd star
Three Enclosures (三垣)	太微垣	Tài Wēi Yuán	Supreme Palace enclosure	九卿	Jiǔqīng	Nine Senior Officers					
Three Enclosures (三垣)	太微垣	Tài Wēi Yuán	Supreme Palace enclosure	九卿	Jiǔqīng	Nine Senior Officers	ρ Vir		九卿一	Jiǔqīngyī	1st star
Three Enclosures (三垣)	太微垣	Tài Wēi Yuán	Supreme Palace enclosure	九卿	Jiǔqīng	Nine Senior Officers	32 Vir		九卿二	Jiǔqīngèr	2nd star
Three Enclosures (三垣)	太微垣	Tài Wēi Yuán	Supreme Palace enclosure	九卿	Jiǔqīng	Nine Senior Officers	HD 109764		九卿三	Jiǔqīngsān	3rd star
Three Enclosures (三垣)	太微垣	Tài Wēi Yuán	Supreme Palace enclosure	九卿	Jiǔqīng	Nine Senior Officers	34 Vir		九卿增四	Jiǔqīngzēngsì	4th additional star
Three Enclosures (三垣)	太微垣	Tài Wēi Yuán	Supreme Palace enclosure	九卿	Jiǔqīng	Nine Senior Officers	27 Vir		九卿增五	Jiǔqīngzēngwǔ	5th additional star
Three Enclosures (三垣)	太微垣	Tài Wēi Yuán	Supreme Palace enclosure	九卿	Jiǔqīng	Nine Senior Officers	33 Vir		九卿增六	Jiǔqīngzēngliù	6th additional star
Three Enclosures (三垣)	太微垣	Tài Wēi Yuán	Supreme Palace enclosure	九卿	Jiǔqīng	Nine Senior Officers	20 Vir		九卿增八	Jiǔqīngzēngbā	8th additional star
Three Enclosures (三垣)	太微垣	Tài Wēi Yuán	Supreme Palace enclosure	內屏	Nèipíng	Inner Screen					
Three Enclosures (三垣)	太微垣	Tài Wēi Yuán	Supreme Palace enclosure	內屏	Nèipíng	Inner Screen	ξ Vir		內屏一	Nèipíngyī	1st star
Three Enclosures (三垣)	太微垣	Tài Wēi Yuán	Supreme Palace enclosure	內屏	Nèipíng	Inner Screen	ν Vir				
Three Enclosures (三垣)	太微垣	Tài Wēi Yuán	Supreme Palace enclosure	內屏	Nèipíng	Inner Screen	ν Vir		內屏二	Nèipíngèr	2nd star
Three Enclosures (三垣)	太微垣	Tài Wēi Yuán	Supreme Palace enclosure	內屏	Nèipíng	Inner Screen	ν Vir		内屏西南星	Nèipíngxīnánxīng	Star in the west
Three Enclosures (三垣)	太微垣	Tài Wēi Yuán	Supreme Palace enclosure	內屏	Nèipíng	Inner Screen	π Vir		內屏三	Nèipíngsān	3rd star
Three Enclosures (三垣)	太微垣	Tài Wēi Yuán	Supreme Palace enclosure	內屏	Nèipíng	Inner Screen	ο Vir		內屏四	Nèipíngsì	4th star
Three Enclosures (三垣)	太微垣	Tài Wēi Yuán	Supreme Palace enclosure	內屏	Nèipíng	Inner Screen	ω Vir		內屏增一	Nèipíngzēngyī	1st additional star
Three Enclosures (三垣)	太微垣	Tài Wēi Yuán	Supreme Palace enclosure	內屏	Nèipíng	Inner Screen	4 Vir		內屏增二	Nèipíngzēngèr	2nd additional star
Three Enclosures (三垣)	太微垣	Tài Wēi Yuán	Supreme Palace enclosure	內屏	Nèipíng	Inner Screen	6 Vir		內屏增三	Nèipíngzēngsān	3rd additional star
Three Enclosures (三垣)	太微垣	Tài Wēi Yuán	Supreme Palace enclosure	內屏	Nèipíng	Inner Screen	12 Vir		內屏增四	Nèipíngzēngsì	4th additional star
Three Enclosures (三垣)	太微垣	Tài Wēi Yuán	Supreme Palace enclosure	內屏	Nèipíng	Inner Screen	11 Vir		內屏增五	Nèipíngzēngwǔ	5th additional star
Three Enclosures (三垣)	太微垣	Tài Wēi Yuán	Supreme Palace enclosure	內屏	Nèipíng	Inner Screen	7 Vir		內屏增六	Nèipíngzēngliù	6th additional star
Azure Dragon of the East (東方青龍)	角	Jiǎo	Horn	角	Jiǎo	Horn					
Azure Dragon of the East (東方青龍)	角	Jiǎo	Horn	角	Jiǎo	Horn	α Vir	Spica	角宿一	Jiǎosuyī	1st star
Azure Dragon of the East (東方青龍)	角	Jiǎo	Horn	角	Jiǎo	Horn	ζ Vir	Heze (for component A)	角宿二	Jiǎosuèr	2nd star
Azure Dragon of the East (東方青龍)	角	Jiǎo	Horn	角	Jiǎo	Horn	65 Vir		角宿增一	Jiǎosuzēngyī	1st additional star
Azure Dragon of the East (東方青龍)	角	Jiǎo	Horn	角	Jiǎo	Horn	72 Vir		角宿增二	Jiǎosuzēngèr	2nd additional star
Azure Dragon of the East (東方青龍)	角	Jiǎo	Horn	角	Jiǎo	Horn	74 Vir	Apamvatsa	角宿增三	Jiǎosuzēngsān	3rd additional star
Azure Dragon of the East (東方青龍)	角	Jiǎo	Horn	角	Jiǎo	Horn	80 Vir		角宿增四	Jiǎosuzēngsì	4th additional star
Azure Dragon of the East (東方青龍)	角	Jiǎo	Horn	角	Jiǎo	Horn	81 Vir		角宿增五	Jiǎosuzēngwǔ	5th additional star
Azure Dragon of the East (東方青龍)	角	Jiǎo	Horn	角	Jiǎo	Horn	88 Vir		角宿增六	Jiǎosuzēngliù	6th additional star
Azure Dragon of the East (東方青龍)	角	Jiǎo	Horn	角	Jiǎo	Horn	86 Vir		角宿增七	Jiǎosuzēngqī	7th additional star
Azure Dragon of the East (東方青龍)	角	Jiǎo	Horn	角	Jiǎo	Horn	76 Vir		角宿增八	Jiǎosuzēngbā	8th additional star
Azure Dragon of the East (東方青龍)	角	Jiǎo	Horn	角	Jiǎo	Horn	68 Vir		角宿增九	Jiǎosuzēngjiǔ	9th additional star
Azure Dragon of the East (東方青龍)	角	Jiǎo	Horn	角	Jiǎo	Horn	62 Vir		角宿增十	Jiǎosuzēngshí	10th additional star
Azure Dragon of the East (東方青龍)	角	Jiǎo	Horn	角	Jiǎo	Horn	58 Vir		角宿增十一	Jiǎosuzēngshíyī	11th additional star
Azure Dragon of the East (東方青龍)	角	Jiǎo	Horn	角	Jiǎo	Horn	56 Vir		角宿增十二	Jiǎosuzēngshíèr	12th additional star
Azure Dragon of the East (東方青龍)	角	Jiǎo	Horn	角	Jiǎo	Horn	Uncertain		角宿增十三	Jiǎosuzēngshísān	13th additional star
Azure Dragon of the East (東方青龍)	角	Jiǎo	Horn	角	Jiǎo	Horn	50 Vir		角宿增十四	Jiǎosuzēngshísì	14th additional star
Azure Dragon of the East (東方青龍)	角	Jiǎo	Horn	角	Jiǎo	Horn	49 Vir		角宿增十五	Jiǎosuzēngshíwǔ	15th additional star
Azure Dragon of the East (東方青龍)	角	Jiǎo	Horn	角	Jiǎo	Horn	66 Vir		角宿增十六	Jiǎosuzēngshíliù	16th additional star
Azure Dragon of the East (東方青龍)	角	Jiǎo	Horn	平道	Píngdào	Flat Road					
Azure Dragon of the East (東方青龍)	角	Jiǎo	Horn	平道	Píngdào	Flat Road	θ Vir		平道一	Píngdàoyī	1st star
Azure Dragon of the East (東方青龍)	角	Jiǎo	Horn	平道	Píngdào	Flat Road	82 Vir		平道二	Píngdàoèr	2nd star
Azure Dragon of the East (東方青龍)	角	Jiǎo	Horn	天田	Tiāntián	Celestial Farmland					
Azure Dragon of the East (東方青龍)	角	Jiǎo	Horn	天田	Tiāntián	Celestial Farmland	σ Vir		天田一	Tiāntiányī	1st star
Azure Dragon of the East (東方青龍)	角	Jiǎo	Horn	天田	Tiāntián	Celestial Farmland	τ Vir		天田二	Tiāntiánèr	2nd star
Azure Dragon of the East (東方青龍)	角	Jiǎo	Horn	進賢	Jìnxián	Recommending Virtuous Men	44 Vir		幸臣	Xìngchén	(One star of)
Azure Dragon of the East (東方青龍)	角	Jiǎo	Horn	天門	Tiānmén	Celestial Gate					
Azure Dragon of the East (東方青龍)	角	Jiǎo	Horn	天門	Tiānmén	Celestial Gate	53 Vir		天門一	Tiānményī	1st star
Azure Dragon of the East (東方青龍)	角	Jiǎo	Horn	天門	Tiānmén	Celestial Gate	69 Vir		天門二	Tiānménèr	2nd star
Azure Dragon of the East (東方青龍)	亢	Kàng	Neck	亢	Kàng	Neck					
Azure Dragon of the East (東方青龍)	亢	Kàng	Neck	亢	Kàng	Neck	κ Vir	Kang	亢宿一	Kàngsuyī	1st star
Azure Dragon of the East (東方青龍)	亢	Kàng	Neck	亢	Kàng	Neck	ι Vir	Syrma (for component A)	亢宿二	Kàngsuèr	2nd star
Azure Dragon of the East (東方青龍)	亢	Kàng	Neck	亢	Kàng	Neck	φ Vir	Elgafar (for component A)	亢宿三	Kàngsusān	3rd star
Azure Dragon of the East (東方青龍)	亢	Kàng	Neck	亢	Kàng	Neck	λ Vir	Khambalia (for component A)	亢宿四	Kàngsusì	4th star
Azure Dragon of the East (東方青龍)	亢	Kàng	Neck	亢	Kàng	Neck	94 Vir		亢宿增一	Kàngsuzēngyī	1st additional star
Azure Dragon of the East (東方青龍)	亢	Kàng	Neck	亢	Kàng	Neck	95 Vir		亢宿增二	Kàngsuzēngèr	2nd additional star
Azure Dragon of the East (東方青龍)	亢	Kàng	Neck	亢	Kàng	Neck	96 Vir		亢宿增三	Kàngsuzēngsān	3rd additional star
Azure Dragon of the East (東方青龍)	亢	Kàng	Neck	亢	Kàng	Neck	97 Vir		亢宿增四	Kàngsuzēngsì	4th additional star
Azure Dragon of the East (東方青龍)	亢	Kàng	Neck	亢	Kàng	Neck	106 Vir		亢宿增五	Kàngsuzēngwǔ	5th additional star
Azure Dragon of the East (東方青龍)	亢	Kàng	Neck	亢	Kàng	Neck	104 Vir		亢宿增六	Kàngsuzēngliù	6th additional star
Azure Dragon of the East (東方青龍)	亢	Kàng	Neck	亢	Kàng	Neck	μ Vir		亢宿增七	Kàngsuzēngqī	7th additional star
Azure Dragon of the East (東方青龍)	亢	Kàng	Neck	亢	Kàng	Neck	108 Vir		亢宿增九	Kàngsuzēngjiǔ	9th additional star
Azure Dragon of the East (東方青龍)	亢	Kàng	Neck	亢	Kàng	Neck	109 Vir	Maenalus	亢宿增十	Kàngsuzēngshí	10th additional star
Azure Dragon of the East (東方青龍)	亢	Kàng	Neck	亢	Kàng	Neck	103 Vir		亢宿增十一	Kàngsuzēngshíyī	11th additional star
Azure Dragon of the East (東方青龍)	亢	Kàng	Neck	亢	Kàng	Neck	υ Vir		亢宿增十二	Kàngsuzēngshíèr	12th additional star

== See also ==
- Traditional Chinese star names
- Chinese constellations
