= HR 4986 =

HR 4986 may refer to:

- HD 114780 a star in Virgo, see List of stars in Virgo
- National Defense Authorization Act for Fiscal Year 2008 (110th USA Congress House Resolution 4986)
