= Wolf 424 =

Star in constellation of Virgo

- Location of Wolf 424 in the constellation Virgo

Observation data Epoch J2000 Equinox ICRS
- Constellation: Virgo
- Right ascension: 12^{h} 33^{m} 17.38^{s}
- Declination: +09° 01′ 15.8″
- Apparent magnitude (V): A: 13.22±0.01; B: 13.21±0.01

Characteristics
- Spectral type: dM6e/dM6e
- Variable type: Flare stars

Astrometry
Radial velocity (R_{v})	−2 km/s
Parallax (π)	227.041±0.389 mas
Distance	14.37 ± 0.02 ly (4.404 ± 0.008 pc)

Wolf 424 A
Proper motion (μ)	RA: −1,795.661 mas/yr Dec.: 217.789 mas/yr
Absolute magnitude (M_{V})	15.03

Wolf 424 B
Proper motion (μ)	RA: −1,710.468 mas/yr Dec.: 203.098 mas/yr
Absolute magnitude (M_{V})	15.02

Orbit
Period (P)	15.811±0.007 yr
Semi-major axis (a)	0.910″±0.069″" (4.062±0.098 AU)
Eccentricity (e)	0.301±0.002
Inclination (i)	102.8±0.2°
Longitude of the node (Ω)	143.2±0.3°
Periastron epoch (T)	2008.12±0.04
Argument of periastron (ω) (secondary)	347.7±1.1°

Details

A
Mass	0.1379±0.0023 M_{☉}
Radius	0.150±0.019 R_{☉}
Temperature	2,966±7 K

B
Mass	0.1258±0.0022 M_{☉}
Radius	0.153±0.019 R_{☉}
Temperature	2,966±7 K

Other designations
- FL Vir, GJ 473, Ci 20 716, G 12-43, G 60-14, LFT 923, LHS 333, LTT 13546, PLX 2890, Wolf 424, GCRV 7553, GSC 00874-00306, Cl* Melotte 25 EGG 43, USNO-B1.0 0990-00217846, VVO 74, 2E 2769, JP11 5148, JP11 5149

Database references
SIMBAD	The system
- A
- B
ARICNS	A
- B

Wolf 424 is a binary star system comprising two red dwarf stars. The stars are located at a distance of 14.37 light-years (4.40 parsecs) and hence are among the nearest stars, but due to their faint intrinsic brightness, they are not visible to the naked eye. Wolf 424 is located in the constellation Virgo, between the stars ε Virginis and ο Virginis.

== Description ==
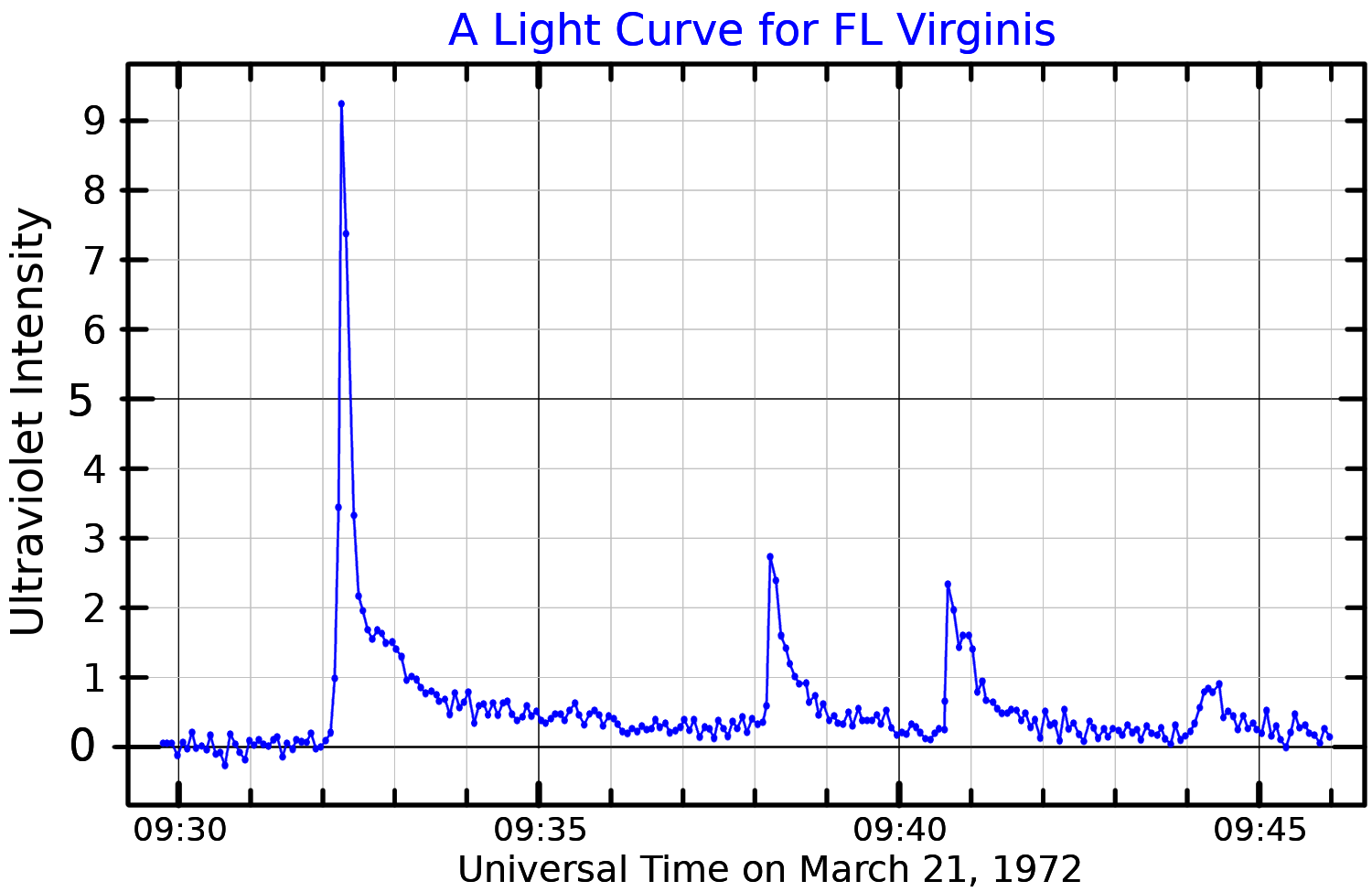
An ultraviolet band light curve for FL Virginis, adapted from Moffett (1972). The plot shows intensity above the star's quiescent intensity.

The close binary nature of this star was discovered by Dutch American astronomer Dirk Reuyl in 1941, based upon an elongation of the star found in photographs. The two stars in the Wolf 424 system orbit about each other with a semi-major axis of 4.1 AU and an eccentricity of 0.3. The stars have an orbital period of 15.5 years and have a combined apparent magnitude of about 12.5.

Wolf 424A and Wolf 424B are similar-spectrum and similar-size stars, both red dwarfs with masses of 0.138 and 0.126 M_{☉} and radii of 0.150 and 0.153 R_{☉}, respectively. In 1967, it was discovered that both are flare stars that undergo random increases in luminosity. The system has been designated FL Virginis, and may experience sunspot activity. The stars may undergo variation in the level of flare activity over periods lasting several years.
