= 78 Virginis =

Star in the constellation Virgo

- Location of 78 Virginis (circled in red)

Observation data Epoch J2000.0 Equinox J2000.0 (ICRS)
- Constellation: Virgo
- Right ascension: 13^{h} 34^{m} 07.93186^{s}
- Declination: +03° 39′ 32.2738″
- Apparent magnitude (V): 4.92

Characteristics
- Spectral type: ApEuCrSr
- B−V color index: 0.029±0.016
- Variable type: α^{2} CVn

Astrometry
Radial velocity (R_{v})	−9.7±0.3 km/s
Proper motion (μ)	RA: +45.51 mas/yr Dec.: −24.70 mas/yr
Parallax (π)	17.65±0.20 mas
Distance	185 ± 2 ly (56.7 ± 0.6 pc)
Absolute magnitude (M_{V})	1.15

Details
Mass	2.16±0.04 M_{☉}
Radius	2.11±0.04 R_{☉}
Luminosity	27±2 L_{☉}
Temperature	9,100±190 K
Rotational velocity (v sin i)	29±4 km/s
Age	435±55 Myr

Other designations
- o Vir, 78 Vir, CW Virginis, BD+04°2764, FK5 1351, HD 118022, HIP 66200, HR 5105, SAO 120004

Database references
SIMBAD	data

78 Virginis is a variable star in the zodiac constellation of Virgo, located 175 light-years from the Sun. It has the variable star designation CW Virginis and the Bayer designation o Virginis; 78 Virginis is the Flamsteed designation. This object is visible to the naked eye as a faint, white-hued star with an apparent visual magnitude of 4.92. It is moving closer to the Earth with a heliocentric radial velocity of −10 km/s.

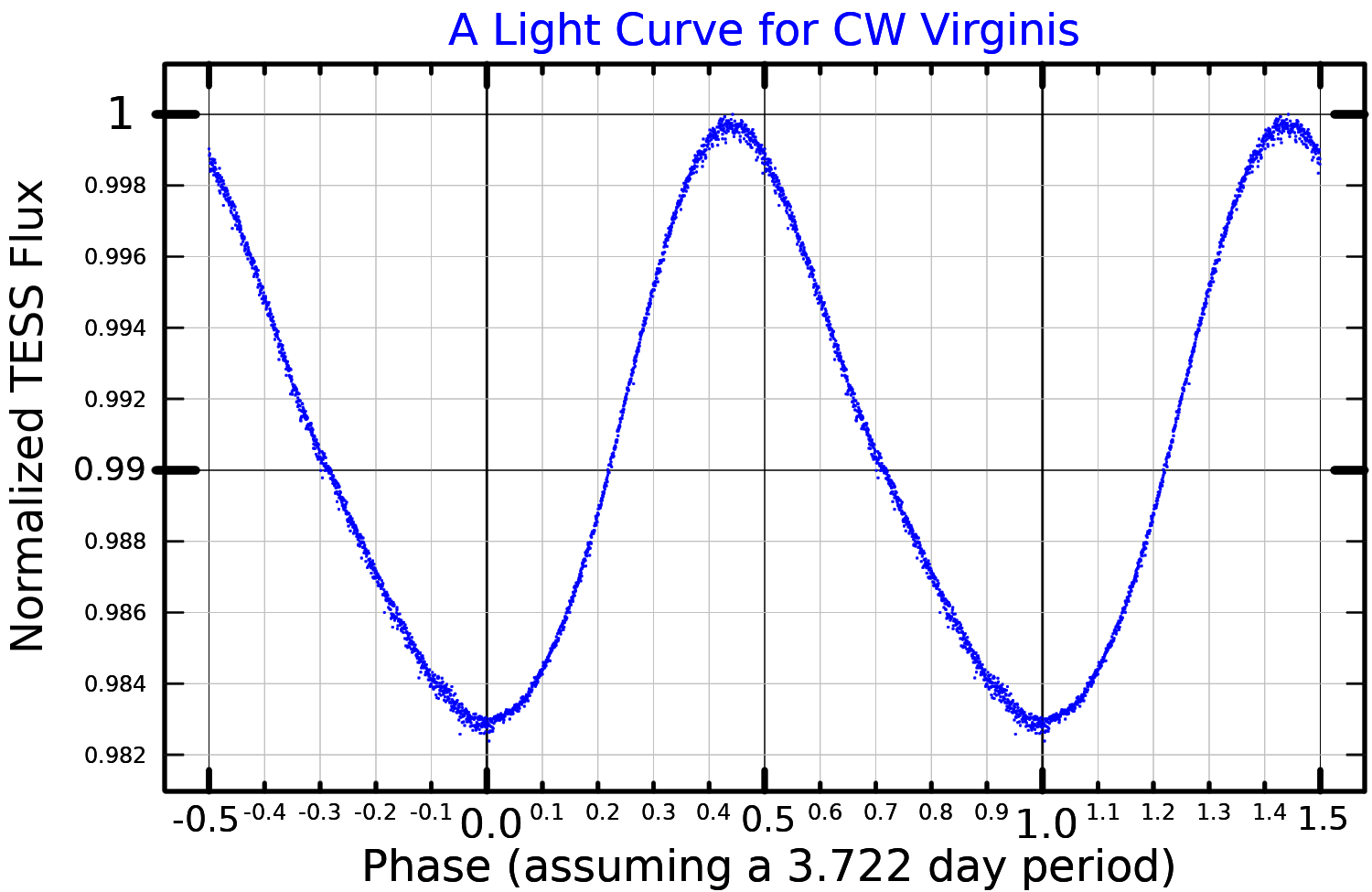
A light curve for CW Virginis, plotted from TESS data

This is an Ap star with a stellar classification of ApEuCrSr, displaying strong lines of strontium, chromium, and other iron peak elements. In 1967, Kazimierz Stepień discovered that the star's brightness varies. It is classified as an Alpha^{2} Canum Venaticorum variable, ranging in magnitude from 4.91 down to 4.99 with a period of 3.722 days. 78 Virginis is the first star other than the Sun to have a magnetic field detected; it displays a dipole structure with a surface intensity of around 3.3 kG. It is a candidate rapidly oscillating Ap (roAp) star. This star is 435 million years old with 2.16 times the mass of the Sun and 2.11 times the Sun's radius. It is radiating 27 times the Sun's luminosity from its photosphere at an effective temperature of 9,100 K.
