= HD 106252 b =

Gas giant

Discovery
- Discovered by: Geneva Extrasolar Planet Search
- Discovery site: La Silla Observatory
- Discovery date: April 4, 2001
- Detection method: radial velocity

Orbital characteristics
- Semi-major axis: 2.655 ± 0.017 AU (397,200,000 ± 2,500,000 km)
- Eccentricity: 0.480 ± 0.010
- Orbital period (sidereal): 4.202+0.011 −0.010 yr
- Inclination: 46.0+4.9 −4.1 or 134.0+4.1 −4.9
- Longitude of ascending node: 105.3+10 −6.1
- Time of periastron: JD 246463.0+8.4 −8.6
- Argument of periastron: 291.4 ± 1.5°
- Semi-amplitude: 152 ± 21
- Star: HD 106252

Physical characteristics
- Mass: 10.00+0.78 −0.73 M_{J}

HD 106252 b is a large gas giant extrasolar planet about 10 times more massive than Jupiter. It was announced in 2001 by the European Southern Observatory. The discovery was confirmed by a different team using the Lick Telescope.

Astrometry of HD 106252 has determined an orbital inclination of either 46° or 134°, depending on whether the solution is prograde or retrograde. This, combined with the minimum mass, gives a true mass of 10.0 M_{J}, larger than the minimum mass of 7.2 M_{J}.
