= ET Virginis =

Evolved red giant star in the constellation Virgo

- Location of ET Virginis (circled in red)

Observation data Epoch J2000 Equinox J2000
- Constellation: Virgo
- Right ascension: 14^{h} 10^{m} 50.48706^{s}
- Declination: −16° 18′ 07.3105″
- Apparent magnitude (V): 4.8 to 5.0

Characteristics
- Evolutionary stage: AGB
- Spectral type: M2 IIIa
- U−B color index: +1.72
- Variable type: SRB

Astrometry
Radial velocity (R_{v})	+18.58±0.56 km/s
Proper motion (μ)	RA: +3.277 mas/yr Dec.: −10.804 mas/yr
Parallax (π)	5.8655±0.2552 mas
Distance	560 ± 20 ly (170 ± 7 pc)
Absolute magnitude (M_{V})	−0.81

Details
Mass	3.24 M_{☉}
Radius	83 R_{☉}
Luminosity	963 L_{☉}
Temperature	3,899 K
Metallicity [Fe/H]	−0.21±0.06 dex
Rotational velocity (v sin i)	2.3±0.9 km/s

Other designations
- ET Vir, BD−15°3817, HD 123934, HIP 69269, HR 5301, SAO 158401

Database references
SIMBAD	data

ET Virginis is a single, red-hued star in the equatorial constellation of Virgo. It can be viewed with the naked eye, having an apparent visual magnitude of about five. Based upon an annual parallax shift of 5.9 mas, it is located 560 light years away. It is moving further from the Earth with a heliocentric radial velocity of +18.6 km/s, having come within 177 ly of the Sun around 6.3 million years ago.

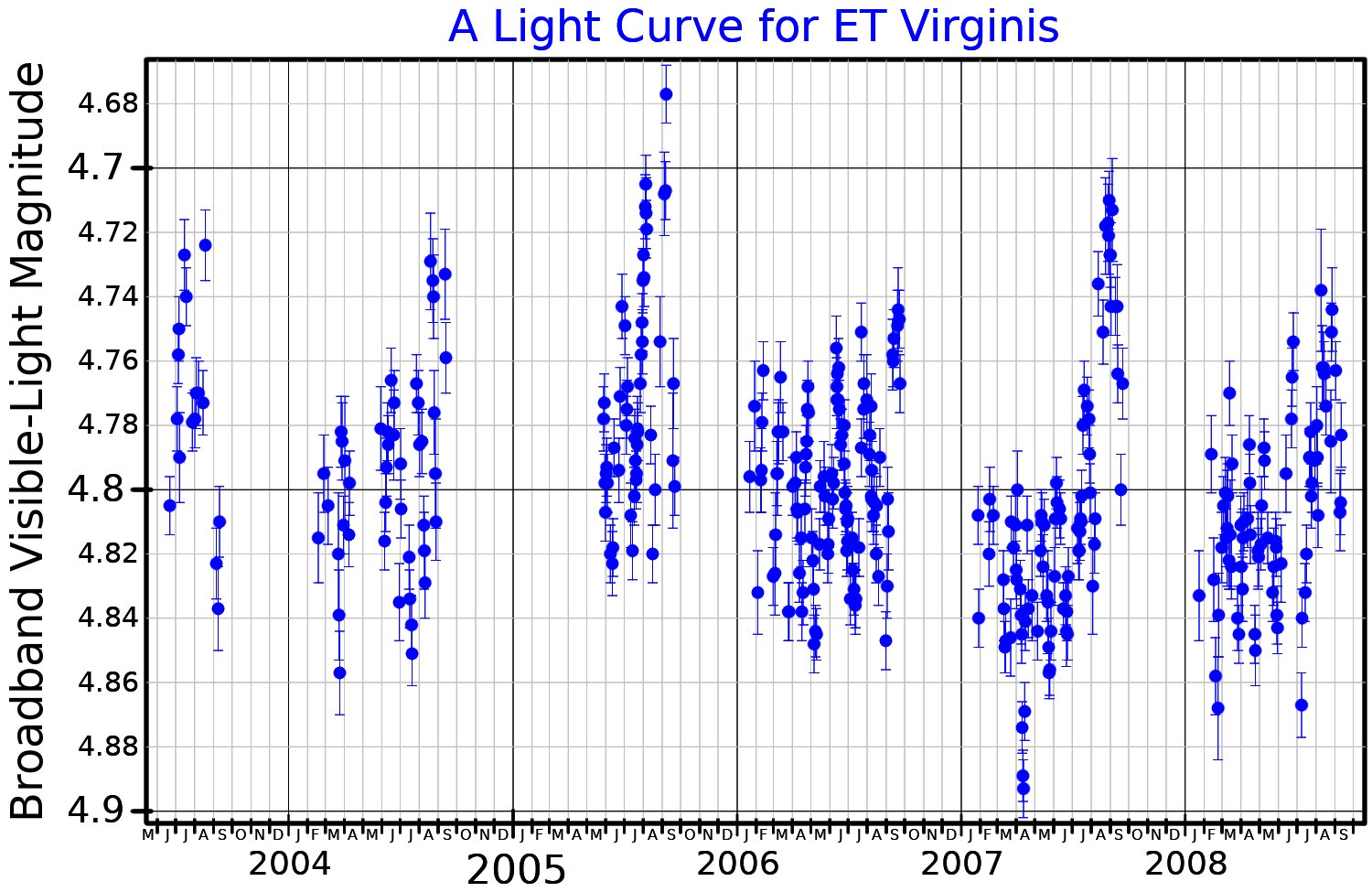
A light curve for ET Virginis, plotted from data published by Tabur et al. (2009)

This is an evolved red giant star with a stellar classification of M2 IIIa. It is a semiregular variable star of subtype SRB with a magnitude that ranges from a high of 4.80 down to 5.00. The measured angular diameter of this star, after correcting for limb darkening, is 4.79±0.34 mas. At its estimated distance, this yields a physical size of 83 times the radius of the Sun.

In 1971, N. R. Stokes announced that the star, then called HD 123934, is a "quasi-periodic" variable star. It received its variable star designation, ET Virginis, in 1972.

ET Vir Pulsation Cycles
Period (Days)	22.6	23.8	36.4	37.6	39.8	48.8	259.1
Amplitude (mag.)	0.021	0.023	0.018	0.027	0.021	0.019	0.032

This star was part of the obsolete constellation Noctua, the owl.
