= HD 106515 =

Binary star system in the constellation Virgo

Observation data Epoch J2000.0 Equinox ICRS
- Constellation: Virgo
- HD 106515 A
- Right ascension: 12^{h} 15^{m} 06.5667^{s}
- Declination: −07° 15′ 26.353″
- Apparent magnitude (V): +7.99
- HD 106515 B
- Right ascension: 12^{h} 15^{m} 06.1003^{s}
- Declination: −07° 15′ 26.587″
- Apparent magnitude (V): +8.25

Characteristics

HD 106515 A
- Evolutionary stage: main sequence
- Spectral type: K0 V

HD 106515 B
- Evolutionary stage: main sequence
- Spectral type: K1 V

Astrometry

HD 106515 A
Radial velocity (R_{v})	20.66±0.11 km/s
Proper motion (μ)	RA: −251.469 mas/yr Dec.: −51.330 mas/yr
Parallax (π)	29.3148±0.0297 mas
Distance	111.3 ± 0.1 ly (34.11 ± 0.03 pc)

HD 106515 B
Radial velocity (R_{v})	19.94±0.11 km/s
Proper motion (μ)	RA: −244.603 mas/yr Dec.: −67.744 mas/yr
Parallax (π)	29.3908±0.0294 mas
Distance	111.0 ± 0.1 ly (34.02 ± 0.03 pc)
Absolute magnitude (M_{V})	4.62

Orbit
Primary	HD 106515 A
Name	HD 106515 B
Period (P)	4802.1+2397 −1141 yr
Semi-major axis (a)	9.822+2.688 −1.329" (345+95 −47 AU)
Eccentricity (e)	0.420+0.106 −0.104
Inclination (i)	164.45+3.5 −11.3°
Longitude of the node (Ω)	92.06+45.08 −2.67°
Periastron epoch (T)	2376.4+44.4 −78.9
Argument of periastron (ω) (secondary)	250.50+38.22 −14.07°

Details

HD 106515 A
Mass	0.888±0.018 M_{☉}
Radius	0.910±0.009 R_{☉}
Luminosity	0.68±0.05 L_{☉}
Surface gravity (log g)	4.39±0.18 cgs
Temperature	5364±57 K
Metallicity [Fe/H]	+0.016±0.009 dex
Rotational velocity (v sin i)	1.7 km/s
Age	9.233±2.133 Gyr

HD 106515 B
Mass	0.861±0.015 M_{☉}
Radius	0.865±0.015 R_{☉}
Luminosity	0.55±0.05 L_{☉}
Surface gravity (log g)	4.30±0.20 cgs
Temperature	5190±58 K
Metallicity [Fe/H]	+0.022±0.010 dex
Rotational velocity (v sin i)	1.8 km/s
Age	9.155±2.199 Gyr

Other designations
- BD−06°3532, HIP 59743, ADS 8477 AB, WDS J12151-0715AB
- HD 106515 A: SAO 138673, LTT 4599, 2MASS J12150658-0715263, Gaia DR2 3584074380866605440
- HD 106515 B: SAO 138674, LTT 4598, 2MASS J12150611-0715265, Gaia DR2 3584074376569429248

Database references
SIMBAD	data
Exoplanet Archive	data

HD 106515 is a binary star (and currently visual triple system) in the constellation of Virgo.

The A and B stars are both K-type main-sequence stars, both somewhat smaller and cooler than the Sun. The two are gravitationally bound and separated at 310 AU. The binary semimajor axis is 390 AU.

The third star in the visual triple, BD−06°3533, is a physically unrelated background star.

== Properties ==
HD 106515 AB is a wide binary system which was first observed by Jérôme de Lalande in 1795.

The discovery of HD 106515 Ab was announced in a preprint submitted on September 12, 2011. The discovery was made using radial velocity measurements obtained at the CORALIE spectrograph located at La Silla Observatory. Confirmation of the discovery was made by a separate team using the Galileo National Telescope at the Roque de los Muchachos Observatory on the island of La Palma in the Canary Islands, Spain. Initially announced as an exoplanet, astrometric observations in 2021 have found that the true mass is significantly higher than its minimum mass predicted from radial velocity, so it is likely a brown dwarf. A 2022 study found a true mass closer to the minimum mass, but the parameters are less well constrained.

The HD 106515 A planetary system
Companion (in order from star)	Mass	Semimajor axis (AU)	Orbital period (years)	Eccentricity	Inclination (°)	Radius
b	18.9+1.5 −1.4 M_{J}	4.48±0.050	9.927+0.030 −0.032	0.571±0.012	29.2+2.4 −2.2	—
