= HD 106315 =

Star in the constellation Virgo

Observation data Epoch J2000 Equinox ICRS
- Constellation: Virgo
- Right ascension: 12^{h} 13^{m} 53.3962^{s}
- Declination: −00° 23′ 36.553″
- Apparent magnitude (V): 8.951

Characteristics
- Evolutionary stage: Main sequence
- Spectral type: F5V
- B−V color index: 0.45

Astrometry
| Radial velocity (R_{v}) | −3.2±0.3 km/s |
| Proper motion (μ) | RA: −2.36±0.03 mas/yr Dec.: 11.943±0.019 mas/yr |
| Parallax (π) | 9.1725±0.0221 mas |
| Distance | 355.6 ± 0.9 ly (109.0 ± 0.3 pc) |

Details
| Mass | 1.105^{+0.028}_{−0.036} M_{☉} |
| Radius | 1.286^{+0.049}_{−0.040} R_{☉} |
| Luminosity | 2.432^{+0.057}_{−0.234} L_{☉} |
| Surface gravity (log g) | 4.261^{+0.027}_{−0.024} cgs |
| Temperature | 6,300±37 K |
| Metallicity [Fe/H] | −0.268^{+0.060}_{−0.071} dex |
| Rotation | 4.78±0.15 |
| Rotational velocity (v sin i) | 12.9±0.4 km/s |
| Age | 3.987^{+0.802}_{−0.516} Gyr |

Other designations
- BD+00 2910, HD 106316, TYC 4940-868-1, GSC 04940-00868, 2MASS J12135339-0023365, K2-109, Gaia DR3 3698307419878650240

Database references
| SIMBAD | data |

HD 106315, or K2-109, is a single star with a pair of close-orbiting exoplanets, located in the constellation of Virgo. Based on parallax measurements, this system lies at a distance of 356 light years from the Sun. At that range, the star is too faint to be seen with the naked eye, as it has an apparent visual magnitude of 8.95. But it is slowly drifting closer with a radial velocity of −3 km/s. As of 2020, multiplicity surveys have not detected any stellar companions to HD 106315.

The spectrum of HD 106315 presents as an ordinary F-type main-sequence star with a stellar classification of F5V, indicating it is generating energy through hydrogen fusion at its core. It is estimated to be roughly four billion years old but is spinning quickly with a rotation period of 5 days. The star is relatively metal-poor, having 60% of solar concentration of iron. It has only a low level of magnetic activity in its chromosphere, showing a minimal level of star spot coverage. The star has 11% more mass and a 29% larger radius than the Sun. It is radiating 2.4 times the luminosity of the Sun from its photosphere at an effective temperature of 6,300 K.

== Planetary system ==
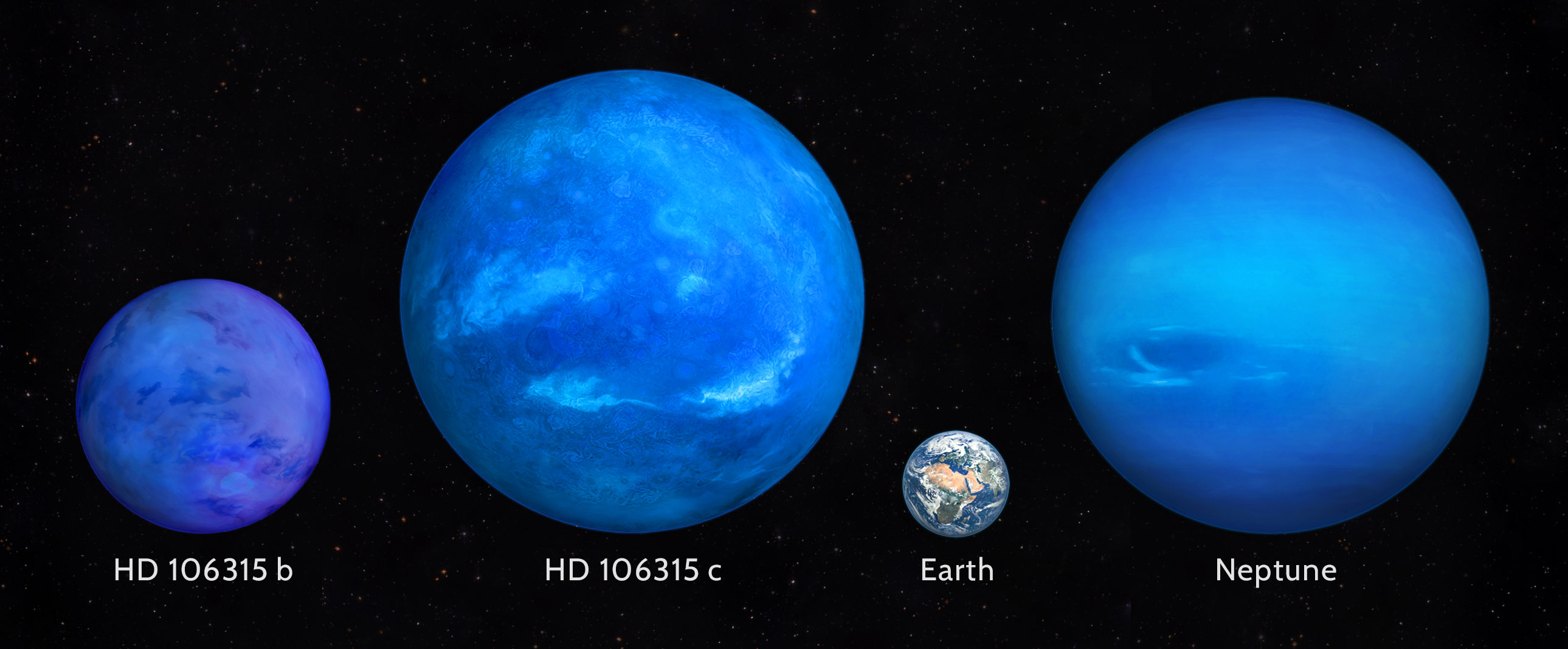
Artist's impression of the two known planets in the HD 106315 system and their size comparison with Earth and Neptune

Two planets were detected by the transit method in 2017, using data from the extended Kepler mission (K2). Their large planetary radii imply both planets have a massive steam atmosphere for planet b and hydrogen-helium atmosphere for planet c. The planetary system of HD 106315 is rather unstable and current planetary orbits are the outcome of violent dynamical history, strongly affected by relativistic effects. The orbits of planets are nearly coplanar, and orbit of c is well aligned with the equatorial plane of the star, misalignment been equal to -10^{+3.6}_{−3.8}°.

Since 2017, a third outer planet with mass above 45M_{🜨} is suspected to exist in the system.

The HD 106315 planetary system
| Companion (in order from star) | Mass | Semimajor axis (AU) | Orbital period (days) | Eccentricity | Inclination (°) | Radius |
|---|---|---|---|---|---|---|
| b | 10.5±3.1 M_{🜨} | 0.0924^{+0.0011}_{−0.0012} | 9.55288±0.00021 | 0 | 87.6^{+3.0}_{−1.7} | 2.4±0.2 R_{🜨} |
| c | 12.0±3.8 M_{🜨} | 0.1565^{+0.0019}_{−0.0020} | 21.05652±0.00012 | 0 | 88.89^{+0.69}_{−0.51} | 4.379±0.086 R_{🜨} |
