= HD 106252 =

Star in the constellation Virgo

Observation data Epoch J2000 Equinox ICRS
- Constellation: Virgo
- Right ascension: 12^{h} 13^{m} 29.510^{s}
- Declination: +10° 02′ 29.89″
- Apparent magnitude (V): 7.41

Characteristics
- Evolutionary stage: main sequence
- Spectral type: G0V
- B−V color index: 0.635±0.007

Astrometry
Radial velocity (R_{v})	15.44±0.11 km/s
Proper motion (μ)	RA: +23.315 mas/yr Dec.: −279.896 mas/yr
Parallax (π)	15.2484±0.00268 mas
Distance	213.90 ± 0.04 ly (65.58 ± 0.01 pc)
Absolute magnitude (M_{V})	4.53

Details
Mass	1.05±0.02 M_{☉}
Radius	1.096 R_{☉}
Luminosity	1.328±0.030 L_{☉}
Surface gravity (log g)	4.40±0.15 cgs
Temperature	5,890±50 K
Metallicity [Fe/H]	−0.06±0.04 dex
Rotation	22.8 d
Rotational velocity (v sin i)	1.74±0.25 km/s
Age	3.00+0.8 −0.6 Gyr

Other designations
- BD+10°2392, HD 106252, HIP 59610, SAO 99998, LTT 13402, NLTT 30020

Database references
SIMBAD	data
Exoplanet Archive	data

HD 106252 is a star with a brown dwarf companion in the constellation Virgo. An apparent visual magnitude of 7.41 means this star is too faint to be visible to the naked eye. It is located at a distance of 210 light years from the Sun based on parallax measurements, and is receding with a radial velocity of 15 km/s.

The stellar classification of HD 106252 is G0V, matching an ordinary G-type main-sequence star. It has 5% more mass than the Sun and 10% greater in girth. This star is about three billion years old with a low level of magnetic activity and is spinning with a projected rotational velocity of 2 km/s. It is radiating 1.3 times the luminosity of the Sun from its photosphere at an effective temperature of 5,890 K.

In 2001, a massive sub-stellar companion was announced orbiting the star by the European Southern Observatory. The discovery was confirmed by a different team using the Lick Telescope. Astrometric observations from Hipparcos in 2011 suggested that its true mass is likely around 30.6 M_{J}, in the brown dwarf range. More accurate astrometry from Gaia in 2021 revealed a smaller true mass of 10.0 M_{J}.

The HD 106252 planetary system
Companion (in order from star)	Mass	Semimajor axis (AU)	Orbital period (years)	Eccentricity	Inclination (°)	Radius
b	10.00+0.78 −0.73 M_{J}	2.655±0.017	4.202+0.011 −0.010	0.480±0.010	46.0+4.9 −4.1	—
