= 89 Virginis =

Single, evolved giant star in the constellation Virgo

Observation data Epoch J2000 Equinox ICRS
- Constellation: Virgo
- Right ascension: 13^{h} 49^{m} 52.28340^{s}
- Declination: −18° 08′ 03.0103″
- Apparent magnitude (V): 4.959

Characteristics
- Spectral type: K0III
- U−B color index: +0.86
- B−V color index: +1.06

Astrometry
Radial velocity (R_{v})	−39.45±0.17 km/s
Proper motion (μ)	RA: −101.100 mas/yr Dec.: −38.200 mas/yr
Parallax (π)	13.9184±0.2053 mas
Distance	234 ± 3 ly (72 ± 1 pc)
Absolute magnitude (M_{V})	0.618

Details
Mass	1.70 M_{☉}
Radius	12 R_{☉}
Luminosity	69 L_{☉}
Surface gravity (log g)	2.6 cgs
Temperature	4,706±13 K
Metallicity [Fe/H]	−0.03 dex
Age	3.40 Gyr

Other designations
- 89 Vir, BD−17°3937, GJ 9460, HD 120452, HIP 67494, HR 5196, SAO 158186

Database references
SIMBAD	data

89 Virginis is a single star in the zodiac constellation of Virgo, located 234 light years from the Sun. It is visible to the naked eye as a dim, orange-hued star with an apparent visual magnitude of 4.959. The star is moving closer to the Earth with a heliocentric radial velocity of −39 km/s.

This is an evolved giant star with a stellar classification of K0 III, having exhausted the hydrogen at its core and expanded away from the main sequence. It is a red clump star, which indicates it is generating energy through helium fusion at its core. This object is 3.4 billion years old with 1.7 times the mass of the Sun and 12 times the Sun's radius. It is radiating 69 times the Sun's luminosity from its enlarged photosphere at an effective temperature of 4706 K.
