= 1 Serpentis =

Red giant star in the constellation Virgo

- Location of 1 Serpentis (circled)

Observation data Epoch J2000.0 Equinox J2000.0
- Constellation: Virgo
- Right ascension: 14^{h} 57^{m} 33.251^{s}
- Declination: −00° 10′ 03.40″
- Apparent magnitude (V): 5.5

Characteristics
- Evolutionary stage: Red clump
- Spectral type: K1III

Astrometry
Radial velocity (R_{v})	20.12 km/s
Proper motion (μ)	RA: +59.929 mas/yr Dec.: −26.500 mas/yr
Parallax (π)	10.1280±0.1010 mas
Distance	322 ± 3 ly (98.7 ± 1.0 pc)
Absolute magnitude (M_{V})	+0.76

Details
Mass	1.37 M_{☉}
Radius	13.6 R_{☉}
Luminosity	75 L_{☉}
Surface gravity (log g)	2.5 cgs
Temperature	4,581 K
Metallicity [Fe/H]	−0.07 dex
Rotational velocity (v sin i)	3.4 km/s
Age	4.58 Gyr

Other designations
- 1 Ser, BD+00°3277, GJ 3881, HD 132132, HIP 73193, HR 5573, SAO 120758

Database references
SIMBAD	data

1 Serpentis (1 Ser) is a red giant in the constellation Virgo with an apparent magnitude of 5.5. It is a red clump giant, a cool horizontal branch star that is fusing helium in its core. It has expanded to over 13 times the radius of the Sun and although it is cooler at 4,581 K it is 77 times more luminous. It is 322 light years away.

The Flamsteed designation 1 Serpentis was given to the star when the constellation Serpens was combined with the constellation Ophiuchus. It was also given the Bayer designation M Serpentis. When Ophiuchus and Serpens were separated into distinct constellations, 1 Serpentis was left over the border in Libra. Since then it has moved slightly and is now in Virgo.

A 10th-magnitude companion star discovered by William Herschel is 86″ away. It is at the same distance as 1 Ser and shares a common proper motion, It is considered likely to be a physical companion, with the two stars separated by 8,600 au. It has a spectral type of G5 IV, and it is slightly smaller and less luminous than the sun.

A much more widely-separated 10th-magnitude star is also listed in multiple star catalogues, but it is an unrelated background object.
