= 110 Virginis =

Star in the constellation Virgo

- Location of 110 Virginis (circled in red)

Observation data Epoch J2000.0 Equinox J2000.0 (ICRS)
- Constellation: Virgo
- Right ascension: 15^{h} 02^{m} 54.03756^{s}
- Declination: +02° 05′ 28.6957″
- Apparent magnitude (V): 4.40

Characteristics
- Evolutionary stage: red clump
- Spectral type: K0.5 IIIb Fe–0.5
- B−V color index: 1.04

Astrometry
Radial velocity (R_{v})	−16.2±0.3 km/s
Proper motion (μ)	RA: −55.569 mas/yr Dec.: +13.628 mas/yr
Parallax (π)	16.7474±0.129 mas
Distance	195 ± 2 ly (59.7 ± 0.5 pc)

Details
Mass	1.67 M_{☉}
Radius	13.78±0.14 R_{☉}
Luminosity	80.4±1.8 L_{☉}
Surface gravity (log g)	2.7 cgs
Temperature	4,655±24 K
Metallicity [Fe/H]	−0.3 dex
Age	4.52 Gyr

Other designations
- 110 Vir, BD+02°2905, FK5 3190, GC 20237, HD 133165, HIP 73620, HR 5601, SAO 120809

Database references
SIMBAD	data

110 Virginis is a star in the zodiac constellation Virgo, located 195 light-years away from Earth. It is visible to the naked eye as an orange-hued star with an apparent visual magnitude of 4.40. The star is moving closer to the Earth with a heliocentric radial velocity of −16 km/s.

The stellar classification of 110 Virginis is K0.5 IIIb Fe–0.5, indicating that this is an evolved giant star with a mild underabundance of iron in its spectrum. At the age of 4.5 billion years old, it belongs to a sub-category of giants called the red clump, which means it is on the horizontal branch and is generating energy through the helium fusion at its core. Compared to the Sun, it has 167% of the mass but has expanded to 14 times the size. The enlarged photosphere has an effective temperature of 4,655 K and is radiating 80 times the Sun's luminosity.
