= HD 125248 =

Binary star system in the constellation of Virgo

- Location of HD 125248 (circled)

Observation data Epoch J2000.0 Equinox ICRS
- Constellation: Virgo
- Right ascension: 14^{h} 18^{m} 38.251^{s}
- Declination: −18° 42′ 57.47″
- Apparent magnitude (V): 5.84 to 5.95

Characteristics
- Evolutionary stage: Main sequence
- Spectral type: A1p SrCrEu or ApSi(Cr)
- B−V color index: 0.013±0.006
- Variable type: α^{2} CVn

Astrometry
Radial velocity (R_{v})	−8.0±0.8 km/s
Proper motion (μ)	RA: −52.197 mas/yr Dec.: −46.004 mas/yr
Parallax (π)	11.497±0.5361 mas
Distance	280 ± 10 ly (87 ± 4 pc)
Absolute magnitude (M_{V})	0.83

Orbit
Period (P)	4.4 yr
Semi-major axis (a)	≥161 Gm (1.08 AU)
Eccentricity (e)	0.21±0.01
Periastron epoch (T)	2,431,475.0 JD
Argument of periastron (ω) (secondary)	82.4±3.4°
Semi-amplitude (K_{1}) (primary)	7.5±0.5 km/s

Details
Mass	2.0±0.6 M_{☉}
Radius	1.95 R_{☉}
Luminosity	42.0±8.3 L_{☉}
Surface gravity (log g)	3.94±0.09 cgs
Temperature	9494±143 K
Metallicity [Fe/H]	0.96±0.16 dex
Rotation	9.29558±0.00006 d
Rotational velocity (v sin i)	18 km/s
Age	247 Myr

Other designations
- 236 G. Virginis, CS Vir, BD−18°3789, FK5 1369, GC 19295, HD 125248, HIP 69929, HR 5355, SAO 158481, PPM 228604

Database references
SIMBAD	data

HD 125248 is a binary star system in the equatorial constellation of Virgo. It has the variable star designation CS Virginis, while HD 125248 is the designation from the Henry Draper Catalogue. This system is dimly visible to the naked eye as a point of light with an apparent visual magnitude that ranges from 5.84 down to 5.95. It is located at a distance of approximately 280 light years from the Sun based on parallax measurements, but is drifting closer with a heliocentric radial velocity of −8 km/s.

This star was classified as peculiar with spectral type A0p in the Henry Draper Catalogue, published 1918–1924. This class was based on the strength of a pair of lines of ionized silicon in its stellar spectrum. In 1931, W. W. Morgan discovered that the spectrum of the star varied over a period of several days. In particular, the lines of ionized chromium and europium varied considerably in intensity, ranging from strong to very faint. This variation shares similarities to those of α^{2} Canum Venaticorum. The two sets of lines vary in the opposite direction from each other, so that the chromium lines were minimum when the europium lines were maximized, and vice versa. In 1947, A. J. Deutsch found a period of 9.295 days for the variation.

H. W. Babcock examined the star using Coudé spectrograms in 1947, finding a general magnetic field with a strength of around 5,500 Gauss at the poles. At the time, that was the strongest magnetic field that had been observed in a star. He noticed that the magnetic field was variable, and it showed the opposite polarity when the lines of europium were at a minimum compared to when they were at the maximum. Subsequent observations showed the period and amplitude of the variation to be stable over time. In 1950, D. W. N. Stibbs first proposed an 'oblique rotator model' to explain the properties of this star, in which its magnetic field is locked at an angle to the axis of rotation.

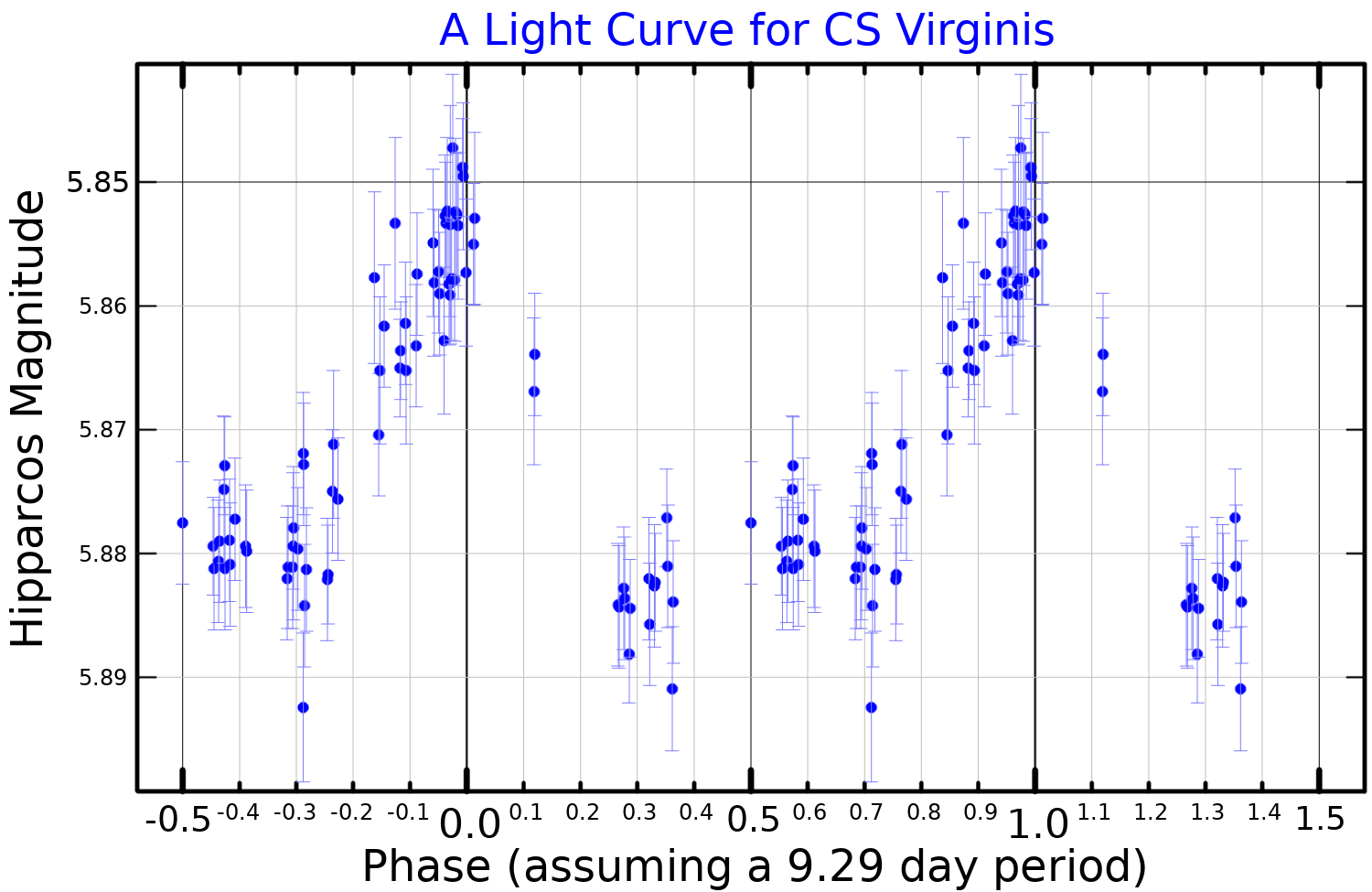
A light curve for CS Virginis, plotted from Hipparcos data

The star displays radial velocity variations that suggest it is a single-lined spectroscopic binary with a period of 4.4 years and an orbital eccentricity of 0.21. The visible component has a stellar classification of A1p SrCrEu, which indicates this is a magnetic peculiar Ap star with prominent abundance anomalies of strontium, chromium, and europium in its atmosphere. It has double the mass and nearly twice the radius of the Sun. The star is an estimated 234 million years old and is spinning with a rotation rate of 9.3 days. It is radiating 42 times the luminosity of the Sun from its photosphere at an effective temperature of 9,850 K.

In 1950, Douglas Walter Noble Stibbs published data showing that HD 125248's brightness varies. It is an Alpha^{2} Canum Venaticorum variable star with a brightness that is modulated by its rotation. Magnetic Doppler imaging of the star suggests the magnetic field deviates strongly from a simple dipole geometry.
