= HD 109271 =

Star in the constellation Virgo

Observation data Epoch J2000.0 Equinox ICRS
- Constellation: Virgo
- Right ascension: 12^{h} 33^{m} 35.555^{s}
- Declination: −11° 37′ 18.73″
- Apparent magnitude (V): 8.05 ± 0.01

Characteristics
- Spectral type: G5 V + DA
- B−V color index: +0.658±0.002

Astrometry
Radial velocity (R_{v})	−4.971±0.0011 km/s
Proper motion (μ)	RA: −169.971 mas/yr Dec.: 81.000 mas/yr
Parallax (π)	17.9082±0.0379 mas
Distance	182.1 ± 0.4 ly (55.8 ± 0.1 pc)
Absolute magnitude (M_{V})	4.1±0.1

Position (relative to HD 109271 A)
Component	HD 109271 B
Epoch of observation	2018
Angular distance	5.425″
Position angle	267.354°
Projected separation	304 AU

Details

HD 109271 A
Mass	1.047±0.024 M_{☉}
Radius	1.295^{+0.023}_{−0.020} R_{☉}
Luminosity	1.649±0.008 L_{☉}
Surface gravity (log g)	4.28±0.10 cgs
Temperature	5,783±62 K
Metallicity [Fe/H]	0.10±0.05 dex
Rotational velocity (v sin i)	2.7 km/s
Age	7.3±1.2 Gyr

HD 109271 B
Mass	~0.6 M_{☉}

Other designations
- BD−10°3494, HD 109271, HIP 61300, SAO 157362, LTT 4770

Database references
SIMBAD	data
Exoplanet Archive	data

HD 109271 is a wide binary star system in the constellation of Virgo. The brighter member of the binary has a pair of orbiting exoplanets. With an apparent visual magnitude of 8.05, it cannot be seen with the naked eye. Parallax measurements made by Gaia put the star at a distance of 181 light-years (55 parsecs) away from the Sun, but it is drifting closer with a radial velocity of −5 km/s. The system shows a high proper motion, traversing the celestial sphere at an angular rate of 0.232 arcsec yr^{−1}.

The primary component is an ordinary G-type main-sequence star with a stellar classification of G5 V. It is a much older star than the Sun with an age of about 7.3 billion years, and is spinning with a projected rotational velocity of 2.7 km/s. This star has 7% more mass than the Sun and a 30% greater girth. The abundance of iron, a measure of the star's metallicity, is similar but slightly higher than in the Sun. It is radiating 1.65 times the luminosity of the Sun from its photosphere at an effective temperature of around 5,783 K.

In 2020, a white dwarf companion of 0.6 M_{☉} was found orbiting the primary at an angular separation of 5.4″ along a position angle of 267°. At the distance of this system, this corresponds to a projected separation of 304 AU. That is, they are physically separated by at least this distance. Additional stellar companions are ruled out down to a separation of 0.15″ from the primary.

== Planetary system ==
From 2003 to 2012, the star was under observance from the High Accuracy Radial Velocity Planet Searcher (HARPS). In 2012, two eccentric hot Neptune-mass planets were deduced by radial velocity. They were published in January 2013. These are close to a 1:4 resonance, so the system is similar to HD 69830. A third Neptune in the Venus zone was hypothesised from the data. These planets managed to survive the post main-sequence epoch of the companion star, when it shed much of its original mass.

The HD 109271 planetary system
Companion (in order from star)	Mass	Semimajor axis (AU)	Orbital period (days)	Eccentricity	Inclination (°)	Radius
b	>0.054 ± 0.004 M_{J}	0.079 ± 0.001	7.8543 ± 0.0009	0.25 ± 0.08	—	—
c	>0.076 ± 0.007 M_{J}	0.196 ± 0.003	30.93 ± 0.02	0.15 ± 0.09	—	—
d (unconfirmed)	>0.07 M_{J}	1	430	0.36	—	—
