= 82 Virginis =

Star in the constellation Virgo

Observation data Epoch J2000 Equinox J2000
- Constellation: Virgo
- Right ascension: 13^{h} 41^{m} 36.770^{s}
- Declination: −08° 42′ 10.73″
- Apparent magnitude (V): 5.01

Characteristics
- Evolutionary stage: AGB
- Spectral type: M1III
- Apparent magnitude (U): 8.59
- Apparent magnitude (B): 6.64
- Apparent magnitude (G): 4.149
- Apparent magnitude (J): 1.68
- Apparent magnitude (H): 0.88
- Apparent magnitude (K): 0.64
- B−V color index: 1.623±0.009

Astrometry
Radial velocity (R_{v})	−36.6±2 km/s
Proper motion (μ)	RA: -91.65 mas/yr Dec.: 40.28 mas/yr
Parallax (π)	5.4376±0.2897 mas
Distance	600 ± 30 ly (184 ± 10 pc)
Absolute magnitude (M_{V})	−0.7

Details
Mass	6.5 M_{☉}
Radius	54 R_{☉}
Luminosity	812 L_{☉}
Surface gravity (log g)	0.714 cgs
Temperature	3,675 K
Rotational velocity (v sin i)	2.3±1 km/s
Age	50 Myr

Other designations
- m Vir, NSV 6390, BD−07 3674, HD 119149, HIP 66803, HR 5150, SAO 139490, TIC 743613, TYC 5546-1582-1, GSC 05546-01582, IRAS 13389-0827, IRC −10293, 2MASS J13413677-0842110

Database references
SIMBAD	data

82 Virginis, also known as m Virginis, is a star in the constellation Virgo. It is located 160 pc (520 light-years) from Earth based on a parallax of 6.249±0.2611 mas from Gaia Data Release 3. It is a red giant, based on its spectral type of M1III. Its apparent magnitude is 5.01.

== Characteristics ==
82 Virginis is a red giant star, based on its spectral type of M1III, where M means that it is an M-type star and III is the luminosity class, meaning it is a giant star. The star is 54 times larger than the Sun. The effective temperature of the star is 3,675 K, which is 2,197 degrees cooler than the solar temperature of 5,772 K. Its rotational velocity is 2.3 km/s. The angular diameter of the star, as measured from the CHARM survey, is of 4.48±0.28 mas. At the current distance, this would lead to a radius of 77 R_{☉}, somewhat larger than the radius derived by Gaia DR3.

The parallax of the star is measured at 5.4376±0.2897 mas from Gaia DR3, translating to a distance of 184 parsecs (600 light-years) from Earth. The star is moving towards Earth at a velocity of 36.6 km/s. Its apparent magnitude is 5.01, making it visible to the naked eye. (Note: According to the Bortle scale)
