= Pi Virginis =

Binary star in the constellation Virgo

π Virginis
- Location of π Virginis (circled)

Observation data Epoch J2000 Equinox ICRS
- Constellation: Virgo
- Right ascension: 12^{h} 00^{m} 52.39042^{s}
- Declination: +06° 36′ 51.5571″
- Apparent magnitude (V): 4.64

Characteristics
- Spectral type: A5 V
- U−B color index: +0.12
- B−V color index: +0.12

Astrometry
Radial velocity (R_{v})	−10.4 km/s
Proper motion (μ)	RA: +0.26 mas/yr Dec.: −30.10 mas/yr
Parallax (π)	8.49±0.39 mas
Distance	380 ± 20 ly (118 ± 5 pc)
Absolute magnitude (M_{V})	−0.70

Orbit
Primary	π Virginis A
Name	π Virginis B
Period (P)	282.69 days
Semi-major axis (a)	3.55 mas
Eccentricity (e)	0.265
Inclination (i)	62.71°
Longitude of the node (Ω)	149.34°
Periastron epoch (T)	2448281.3906
Argument of periastron (ω) (secondary)	312°
Semi-amplitude (K_{1}) (primary)	26.20 km/s

Details

π Vir A
Mass	2.0 M_{☉}
Radius	4.1 R_{☉}
Luminosity	68 L_{☉}
Surface gravity (log g)	3.51 cgs
Temperature	8,000 K
Rotational velocity (v sin i)	71 km/s
Age	618 Myr

Other designations
- BD+07°2502, FK5 1311, HD 104321, HIP 58590, HR 4589, SAO 119164

Database references
SIMBAD	data

Pi Virginis (π Vir, π Virginis) is a binary star in the zodiac constellation of Virgo. It is visible to the naked eye with an apparent visual magnitude of 4.64. The distance to this star, based upon parallax measurements, is roughly 380 light years.

This is a spectroscopic binary system with a stellar classification of A5V. They have an orbital period of 283 days with an eccentricity of 0.27. The mass ratio of the two stars is about 0.47, with the primary having an estimated mass of around 2.2 times that of the Sun. The primary is a cool metallic-lined Am star.
