= 53 Virginis =

Star in the constellation Virgo

Observation data Epoch J2000 Equinox J2000
- Constellation: Virgo
- Right ascension: 13^{h} 12^{m} 03.54378^{s}
- Declination: −16° 11′ 54.9682″
- Apparent magnitude (V): 5.04

Characteristics
- Spectral type: F5.5 V
- B−V color index: 0.46

Astrometry
Radial velocity (R_{v})	−12.7±0.2 km/s
Proper motion (μ)	RA: +97.32 mas/yr Dec.: −287.65 mas/yr
Parallax (π)	29.49±0.29 mas
Distance	111 ± 1 ly (33.9 ± 0.3 pc)
Absolute magnitude (M_{V})	2.46±0.03

Details
Mass	1.21 M_{☉}
Radius	3.0 R_{☉}
Luminosity	9.45 L_{☉}
Surface gravity (log g)	3.85±0.14 cgs
Temperature	6,346±216 K
Metallicity [Fe/H]	−0.04±0.04 dex
Rotational velocity (v sin i)	13.5±0.6 km/s
Age	2.923 Gyr

Other designations
- 53 Vir, NSV 6136, BD−15° 3613, HD 114642, HIP 64407, HR 4981, SAO 157788, WDS J13121-1612A

Database references
SIMBAD	data

53 Virginis is a single, yellow-white hued star in the zodiac constellation of Virgo. It is faintly visible to the naked eye, having an apparent visual magnitude of 5.04. Based upon an annual parallax shift of 29.49±0.29 mas, it is located 111 light years away. The star is moving closer to the Sun with a heliocentric radial velocity of −12.7 km/s. It has a relatively high rate of proper motion, traversing the celestial sphere at the rate of 284±18 mas/yr along a position angle of 162.2°.

Gray et al. (2006) assigned this star a stellar classification of F5.5 V, matching an ordinary F-type main-sequence star. Older studies, such as Malaroda (1975) or Eggen (1955), listed a class of F5 III-IV or F6 III-IV, suggesting a more evolved condition. It is spinning with a projected rotational velocity of 13.5 km/s and appears to be undergoing differential rotation. The star is nearly three billion years old, with 1.21 times the mass of the Sun and about three times the Sun's radius. It is radiating over nine times the Sun's luminosity from its photosphere at an effective temperature of around 6,346 K.

The star has three visual companions, the nearest being a magnitude 12.5 star located at an angular separation of 104.10″ along a position angle of 1°, as of 2000.
