= Nu Virginis =

Variable star in the constellation Virgo

ν Virginis
- Location of ν Virginis (circled)

Observation data Epoch J2000.0 Equinox ICRS
- Constellation: Virgo
- Right ascension: 11^{h} 45^{m} 51.5596^{s}
- Declination: +06° 31′ 45.749″
- Apparent magnitude (V): 4.04

Characteristics
- Evolutionary stage: asymptotic giant branch
- Spectral type: M1 III
- U−B color index: +1.80
- B−V color index: +1.52

Astrometry
Radial velocity (R_{v})	50.19±0.30 km/s
Proper motion (μ)	RA: −21.1 mas/yr Dec.: −182.9 mas/yr
Parallax (π)	9.8446±0.2744 mas
Distance	331 ± 9 ly (102 ± 3 pc)
Absolute magnitude (M_{V})	−0.87

Details
Mass	0.92±0.00 M_{☉}
Radius	54.8±0.9 R_{☉}
Luminosity	523±31 L_{☉}
Surface gravity (log g)	1.0 cgs
Temperature	3,728±47 K
Metallicity [Fe/H]	−0.41 dex
Rotational velocity (v sin i)	3.8 km/s
Age	11.69±0.13 Gyr

Other designations
- ν Vir, 3 Virginis, BD+07°2479, FK5 1302, HD 102212, HIP 57380, HR 4517, SAO 119035

Database references
SIMBAD	data

ν Virginis, Latinized as Nu Virginis, is a single star in the zodiac constellation of Virgo, located at the western tip of the classic constellation and nearly due south of the prominent star Denebola. It is a red-hued star with an apparent visual magnitude of 4.04 and can be seen with the naked eye. Because the star lies near the ecliptic it is subject to occultations by the Moon. Parallax measurements provide an estimated distance of around 331 light years from the Sun, and it is drifting further away with a radial velocity of +50 km/s.

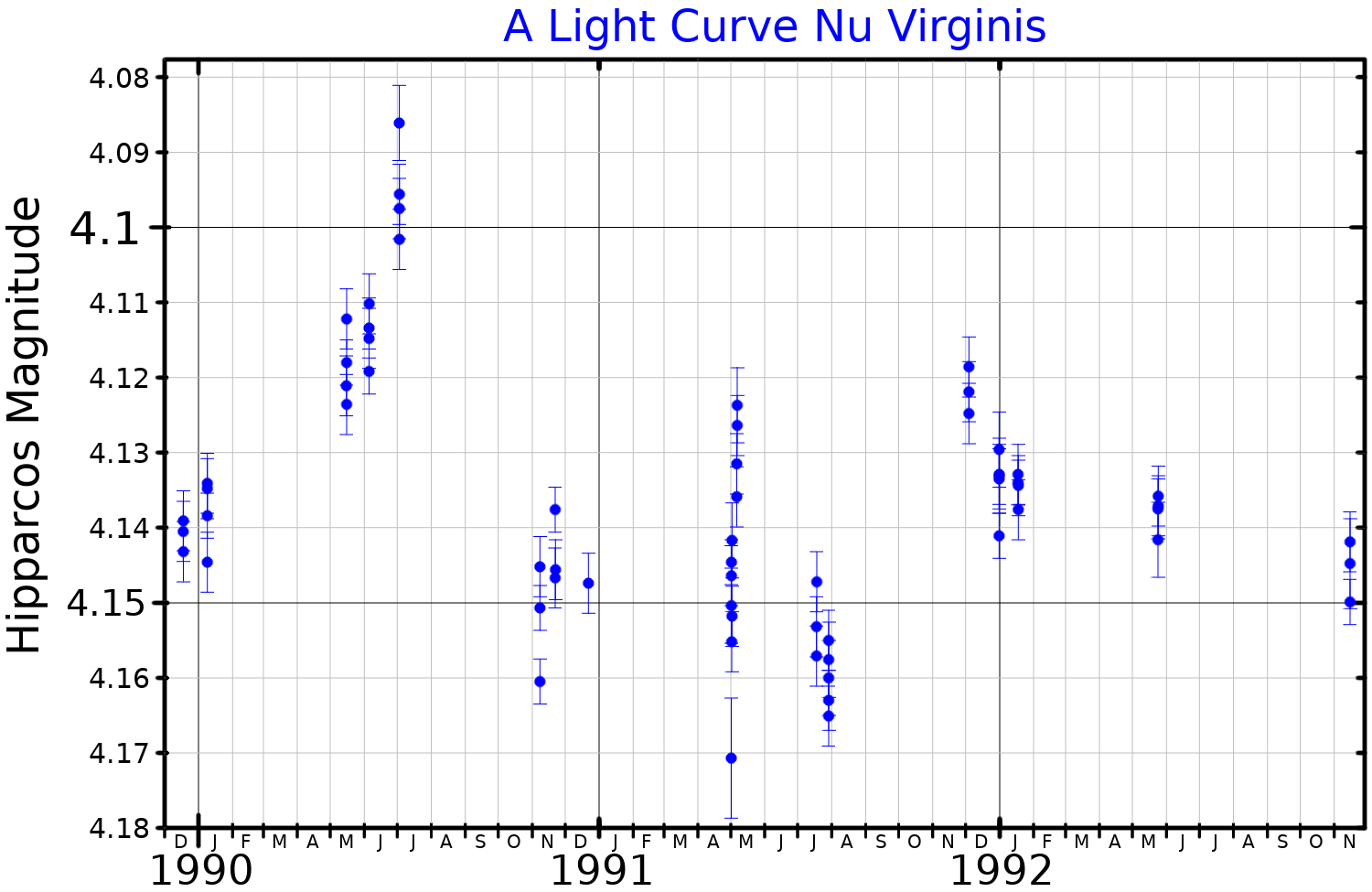
A light curve for Nu Virginis, plotted from Hipparcos data

This object is an M-type red giant, currently on the asymptotic giant branch, with a stellar classification of M1 III. The star was discovered to be a variable star when the Hipparcos data was analyzed. It is an SRB-type semiregular variable star with its brightness varying by 0.0125 in magnitude. These variations have four periods lasting 11.1, 12.3, 16.8, and 23.7 days. This star has 90% the mass of the sun, but it has expanded to 54 times the Sun's radius and shines 520 times as brightly as the Sun. The effective temperature of its outer atmosphere is 3,728 K.
