= Xi Virginis =

Star in the constellation Virgo

ξ Virginis
- Location of ξ Virginis (circled)

Observation data Epoch J2000.0 Equinox ICRS
- Constellation: Virgo
- Right ascension: 11^{h} 45^{m} 17.04027^{s}
- Declination: +08° 15′ 29.2150″
- Apparent magnitude (V): 4.83

Characteristics
- Evolutionary stage: main sequence
- Spectral type: A4 V
- U−B color index: +0.10
- B−V color index: +0.17

Astrometry
Radial velocity (R_{v})	−0.5 km/s
Proper motion (μ)	RA: +60.08 mas/yr Dec.: −24.50 mas/yr
Parallax (π)	26.73±0.25 mas
Distance	122 ± 1 ly (37.4 ± 0.3 pc)
Absolute magnitude (M_{V})	+1.98

Details
Mass	1.93 M_{☉}
Radius	1.5 R_{☉}
Luminosity	12.6 L_{☉}
Surface gravity (log g)	4.31 cgs
Temperature	8,172 K
Rotational velocity (v sin i)	130 km/s
Age	480 Myr

Other designations
- ξ Vir, 2 Virginis, BD]+09°2545, HD 102124, HIP 57328, HR 4515, SAO 119029

Database references
SIMBAD	data

Xi Virginis (ξ Vir, ξ Virginis) is a solitary star in the zodiac constellation of Virgo. It is bright enough to be seen with the naked eye, having an apparent visual magnitude of 4.83. The distance to this star is about 122 light years, as determined from parallax readings.

Xi Virginis is an A-type main sequence star with a stellar classification of A4 V. It has an estimated age of 480 million years and is spinning rapidly with a projected rotational velocity of 130 km/s. It has about 150% the Sun's radius and shines with 12.6 times the luminosity of the Sun.
