= 69 Virginis =

Star in the constellation Virgo

- Location of 69 Virginis (circled in red)

Observation data Epoch J2000.0 Equinox J2000.0 (ICRS)
- Constellation: Virgo
- Right ascension: 13^{h} 27^{m} 27.16348^{s}
- Declination: −15° 58′ 24.8980″
- Apparent magnitude (V): 4.76

Characteristics
- Evolutionary stage: horizontal branch
- Spectral type: K0 III-IIIb CN1.5 CH0.5
- U−B color index: +1.06
- B−V color index: +1.09

Astrometry
Radial velocity (R_{v})	−12.9±0.5 km/s
Proper motion (μ)	RA: −121.016 mas/yr Dec.: +21.197 mas/yr
Parallax (π)	12.5871±0.2367 mas
Distance	259 ± 5 ly (79 ± 1 pc)
Absolute magnitude (M_{V})	0.09

Details
Mass	3.51±0.94 M_{☉}
Radius	15 R_{☉}
Luminosity	87.1 L_{☉}
Surface gravity (log g)	2.70±0.11 cgs
Temperature	4,909±92 K
Metallicity [Fe/H]	0.11 dex
Rotational velocity (v sin i)	4.3 km/s
Age	288+343 −156 Myr

Other designations
- 69 Vir, NSV 6253, BD−15°3668, GJ 9444, HD 116976, HIP 65639, HR 5068, SAO 157946

Database references
SIMBAD	data

69 Virginis is a single star in the zodiac constellation of Virgo, located about 259 light years away. It is visible to the naked eye as a faint orange-hued star with an apparent visual magnitude of 4.76, although it is a suspected variable that may range in magnitude from 4.75 down to 4.79. This object is moving closer to the Earth with a heliocentric radial velocity of −13 km/s. The light from this star is polarized due to intervening interstellar dust.

This is an evolved K-type giant star with a stellar classification of K0 III-IIIb CN1.5 CH0.5, showing overabundances of CN and CH molecules in the spectrum. It is a red clump giant, which indicates is on the horizontal branch generating energy via helium fusion at its core. The star is about 288 million years old with 3.5 times the mass of the Sun and 15 times the Sun's radius. It is radiating 87 times the Sun's luminosity from its enlarged photosphere at an effective temperature of 4,909 K.
