= Mu Virginis =

F-type main sequence star in the constellation Virgo

- Location of μ Virginis (circled)

Observation data Epoch J2000.0 Equinox ICRS
- Constellation: Virgo
- Right ascension: 14^{h} 43^{m} 03.62282^{s}
- Declination: −05° 39′ 29.5327″
- Apparent magnitude (V): 3.88

Characteristics
- Spectral type: F2 V
- U−B color index: −0.04
- B−V color index: +0.39

Astrometry
Radial velocity (R_{v})	5.10±0.7 km/s
Proper motion (μ)	RA: +103.28 mas/yr Dec.: −318.63 mas/yr
Parallax (π)	54.73±0.20 mas
Distance	59.6 ± 0.2 ly (18.27 ± 0.07 pc)
Absolute magnitude (M_{V})	2.57

Details
Radius	1.99 R_{☉}
Luminosity	7.474 L_{☉}
Surface gravity (log g)	4.21 cgs
Temperature	6,751 K
Metallicity [Fe/H]	−0.05 dex
Rotational velocity (v sin i)	47.0 km/s
Age	1.5 Gyr

Other designations
- Rijl al Awwa, μ Vir, 107 Vir, BD−05°3936, FK5 545, GJ 9491, HD 129502, HIP 71957, HR 5487, SAO 140090

Database references
SIMBAD	data

Mu Virginis, Latinized from μ Virginis, is a star in the zodiac constellation of Virgo. It was listed in the Calendarium of Al Achsasi al Mouakket as rijl al-‘awwā’, Arabic رجل العواء, meaning "The foot of the barking (dog)". With an apparent visual magnitude of 3.88, it is bright enough to be seen with the naked eye. The position of the star near the celestial equator means it is visible from most of the Earth. Based upon parallax measurements, Mu Virginis is located some 59.6 light-years from the Sun.

Mu Virginis is an F-type main-sequence star with a stellar classification of F2 V, although it does show some evidence of being a more evolved star. It has an effective temperature of 6,751 K in its outer atmosphere. The estimated age of the star is 1.5 billion years, and it has a relatively high 47.0 km/s projected rotational velocity. A 1990 study of the star gave it a giant star classification, and modeled it with 1.7 times the mass of the Sun, 2.1 times the Sun's radius, and shining with 9.8 times the Sun's luminosity.

Past observations of this star show some indications of short-term chromospheric variability as well as radial velocity variations. It has a candidate common proper motion companion at a projected separation of 770 AU. This object has a J band magnitude of 10.72.
