= Theta Virginis =

Multiple star system in the constellation of Virgo

θ Virginis
- Location of θ Virginis (circled)

Observation data Epoch J2000.0 Equinox ICRS
- Constellation: Virgo
- Right ascension: 13^{h} 09^{m} 56.99067^{s}
- Declination: −05° 32′ 20.4185″
- Apparent magnitude (V): 4.37 (4.49 + 6.83 + 9.4 + 10.4)‍

Characteristics
- Spectral type: A1Vs + ? + A9m + ?
- U−B color index: +0.00
- B−V color index: −0.02

Astrometry
Radial velocity (R_{v})	−2.9 km/s
Proper motion (μ)	RA: −36.28 mas/yr Dec.: −31.22 mas/yr
Parallax (π)	10.33±1.09 mas
Distance	approx. 320 ly (approx. 100 pc)
Absolute magnitude (M_{V})	−0.52

Details

θ Vir Aa
Mass	3.11±0.11 M_{☉}
Radius	4.03±0.30 R_{☉}
Luminosity	130+22 −19 L_{☉}
Surface gravity (log g)	3.61±0.11 cgs
Temperature	9,600±140 K
Metallicity [Fe/H]	0.15±0.14 dex
Rotational velocity (v sin i)	4±1 km/s

Other designations
- 51 Virginis, θ Vir, BD−04°3430, FK5 490, HD 114330, HIP 64238, HR 4963, SAO 139189.

Database references
SIMBAD	data

Theta Virginis (θ Vir, θ Virginis) is a multiple star system in the zodiac constellation of Virgo. Based upon parallax measurements, it is about 320 light years from the Sun. The three stars in this system have a combined apparent visual magnitude of 4.37, bright enough to be seen with the naked eye.

The primary component, Theta Virginis Aa, is a white-hued A-type main sequence star with a stellar classification of A1Vs. It is part of a spectroscopic binary which components, Aa and Ab, have visual magnitudes of +4.49 and +6.83 respectively. The system has an orbital period of about 33.04 years with an eccentricity of 0.9. The brighter member of this pair shows photometric and radial velocity periodicities with a cycle time of 0.7 days, which may indicate its rotation period.

The inner pair is orbited by the 9.4 magnitude B component, at an angular separation of 7.1 arcseconds. A fourth component C, 69.6 arcseconds away, has an apparent magnitude of 10.4. However, component C is an optical companion: it is physically unrelated and only appears close in the sky.

On 11 November 2028 and again 11 November 2036, it will have close conjunctions with Venus.
