= Upsilon Virginis =

Star in the constellation Virgo

υ Virginis
- Location of υ Virginis (circled)

Observation data Epoch J2000 Equinox ICRS
- Constellation: Virgo
- Right ascension: 14^{h} 19^{m} 32.47974^{s}
- Declination: −02° 15′ 55.8587″
- Apparent magnitude (V): 5.27

Characteristics
- Evolutionary stage: red giant branch
- Spectral type: G9 III
- U−B color index: +0.81
- B−V color index: 1.023

Astrometry
Radial velocity (R_{v})	−26.68±0.16 km/s
Proper motion (μ)	RA: −118.809 mas/yr Dec.: −71.508 mas/yr
Parallax (π)	12.1137±0.1301 mas
Distance	269 ± 3 ly (82.6 ± 0.9 pc)
Absolute magnitude (M_{V})	0.4

Details
Mass	1.72 M_{☉}
Radius	12 R_{☉}
Luminosity	64.6 L_{☉}
Surface gravity (log g)	2.7 cgs
Temperature	4,753 K
Metallicity [Fe/H]	−0.22 dex
Rotational velocity (v sin i)	3.4 km/s
Age	377 Myr

Other designations
- υ Vir, 102 Virginis, BD−01°2938, FK5 3134, HD 125454, HIP 70012, HR 5366, SAO 139866

Database references
SIMBAD	data

Upsilon Virginis (υ Vir, υ Virginis) is a single star in the zodiac constellation of Virgo. It has an apparent visual magnitude of 5.25, making it faintly visible to the naked eye. According to the Bortle scale, it is visible from backlit suburban skies at night. Based upon a measured annual parallax shift of 12.1 mas, it is located roughly 269 light-years (82.6 parsecs) from the Sun. If the star were at a distance of 33 light-years (10 parsecs), it would have a magnitude of +0.4 and be the third-brightest star in the night sky.

This star has a stellar classification of G9 III, which indicates it is an evolved G-type giant star. It has an estimated 172% of the Sun's mass and has expanded to 12 times the radius of the Sun, from which it is shining with 64.6 times the solar luminosity. The effective temperature of the star's outer atmosphere is 4,753 K. Based upon its motion through space, there is a 66% chance of being a member of the Hercules stream and a 27% chance it is a thin disk star.
