= Tau Virginis =

Star in the constellation Virgo

τ Virginis
- Location of τ Virginis (circled)

Observation data Epoch J2000 Equinox J2000
- Constellation: Virgo
- Right ascension: 14^{h} 01^{m} 38.79341^{s}
- Declination: +01° 32′ 40.3145″
- Apparent magnitude (V): 4.2777±0.0007

Characteristics
- Spectral type: A2IV/V
- U−B color index: +0.12
- B−V color index: +0.11

Astrometry
Radial velocity (R_{v})	−6.7±0.9 km/s
Proper motion (μ)	RA: +17.49 mas/yr Dec.: −21.27 mas/yr
Parallax (π)	14.50±0.18 mas
Distance	225 ± 3 ly (69.0 ± 0.9 pc)
Absolute magnitude (M_{V})	+0.5

Details
Mass	1.96 M_{☉}
Radius	1.6 R_{☉}
Luminosity	70 L_{☉}
Surface gravity (log g)	3.39 cgs
Temperature	8,413±286 K
Metallicity [Fe/H]	−0.19 dex
Rotational velocity (v sin i)	186 km/s
Age	724 Myr

Other designations
- τ Vir, 93 Virginis, BD+02°2761, FK5 516, HD 122408, HIP 68520, HR 5264, SAO 120238

Database references
SIMBAD	data

Tau Virginis (τ Vir, τ Virginis) is a single star in the zodiac constellation Virgo. With an apparent visual magnitude of 4.28, it is faintly visible to the naked eye. The distance to Tau Virginis, based upon parallax measurements, is approximately 225 light years with a margin of error of ±3 light years.

This star has a stellar classification of A2IV/V, which matches the spectrum of an A-type main sequence star mixed with spectral traits of a subgiant. It is about 700 million years old and is spinning rapidly with a projected rotational velocity of 186 km/s. The star has nearly double the mass of the Sun and about 160% of the Sun's radius. It shines with 70 times the luminosity of the Sun and has an effective temperature of 8413 K in its outer atmosphere.

Tau Virginis has multiple visual companions, listed below:

Companion	Visual Magnitude	Angular Separation	Position Angle	Year Measured
B	9.41	82.70″	287°	2012
C	13.10	176.70″	353°	2000
D	9.68	342.70″	85°	2012
E	12.00	14.6″	175°	2009
