= 16 Virginis =

Star in the constellation Virgo

- Location of 16 Virginis (circled in red)

Observation data Epoch J2000.0 Equinox J2000.0 (ICRS)
- Constellation: Virgo
- Right ascension: 12^{h} 20^{m} 20.98133^{s}
- Declination: +03° 18′ 45.2604″
- Apparent magnitude (V): 4.96

Characteristics
- Evolutionary stage: red clump
- Spectral type: K0.5 IIIb Fe−0.5
- B−V color index: 1.16

Astrometry
Radial velocity (R_{v})	+36.66±0.17 km/s
Proper motion (μ)	RA: −292.95 mas/yr Dec.: −63.58 mas/yr
Parallax (π)	10.59±0.25 mas
Distance	308 ± 7 ly (94 ± 2 pc)
Absolute magnitude (M_{V})	+0.10

Details
Mass	1.62 M_{☉}
Radius	19.3 R_{☉}
Luminosity	131.8 L_{☉}
Surface gravity (log g)	1.77 cgs
Temperature	4,423±32 K
Metallicity [Fe/H]	−0.38 dex
Rotational velocity (v sin i)	4.2 km/s
Age	3.22 Gyr

Other designations
- c Vir, 16 Vir, NSV 5558, BD+04°2604, HD 107328, HIP 60172, HR 4695, SAO 119341

Database references
SIMBAD	data

16 Virginis is a single star in the zodiac constellation of Virgo, located about 308 light years from the Sun. It has the Bayer designation c Virginis; 16 Virginis is the Flamsteed designation. This object is visible to the naked eye as a faint, orange-hued star with an apparent visual magnitude of 4.96. This is an IAU radial velocity standard star; it is moving further from the Earth with a heliocentric radial velocity of +37 km/s. The star has a relatively high proper motion, traversing the celestial sphere at an angular rate of 0.301″ per year.

In Chinese astronomy, 16 Virginis is called 謁者, Pinyin: Yèzhě, meaning Usher to the Court, because this star is marking itself and stand alone in Usher to the Court asterism, Supreme Palace enclosure mansion (see: Chinese constellation).

This is an evolved K-type giant star with a stellar classification of K0.5 IIIb Fe−0.5, where the suffix notation denotes a mild under-abundance of iron in the spectrum. It is a red clump giant, which indicates is on the horizontal branch generating energy via helium fusion at its core. The interferometry-measured angular diameter of this star, after correcting for limb darkening, is 1.74±0.02 mas, while the physical radius is about 19 times the radius of the Sun. It is about three billion years old with 1.62 times the mass of the Sun and is radiating 132 times the Sun's luminosity from its enlarged photosphere at an effective temperature of 4,423 K.
