= Omega Virginis =

Star in the constellation Virgo

ω Virginis
- Location of ω Virginis (circled)

Observation data Epoch J2000 Equinox ICRS
- Constellation: Virgo
- Right ascension: 11^{h} 38^{m} 27.60727^{s}
- Declination: +08° 08′ 03.4663″
- Apparent magnitude (V): 5.23 - 5.50

Characteristics
- Evolutionary stage: AGB
- Spectral type: M4 III
- U−B color index: +1.63
- B−V color index: +1.60
- Variable type: LB or SR

Astrometry
Radial velocity (R_{v})	+5.13±0.52 km/s
Proper motion (μ)	RA: −3.89 mas/yr Dec.: +5.30 mas/yr
Parallax (π)	6.56±0.36 mas
Distance	500 ± 30 ly (152 ± 8 pc)
Absolute magnitude (M_{V})	+0.2

Details
Mass	1.55 M_{☉}
Radius	138 ± 17 (Note: Calculated, using the Stefan-Boltzmann law and the star's effective temperature and luminosity, with respect to the solar nominal effective temperature of 5,772 K: $$\sqrt{\biggl(\frac{5,772}{3,400}\biggr)^4 \cdot 2,300} = 138\ R_\odot.$$) R_{☉}
Luminosity	2,300±500 L_{☉}
Surface gravity (log g)	0.8 cgs
Temperature	3,400±100 K
Metallicity [Fe/H]	−0.08 dex

Other designations
- ω Vir, 1 Virginis, BD+08°2532, FK5 2932, HD 101153, HIP 56779, HR 4483, SAO 118965

Database references
SIMBAD	data

Omega Virginis (ω Vir, ω Virginis) is a solitary star in the zodiac constellation Virgo. It has an apparent visual magnitude of +5.2, which is bright enough to be faintly visible to the naked eye. Based upon an annual stellar parallax shift of 6.56 milliarcseconds, it is located about 500 light years from the Sun.

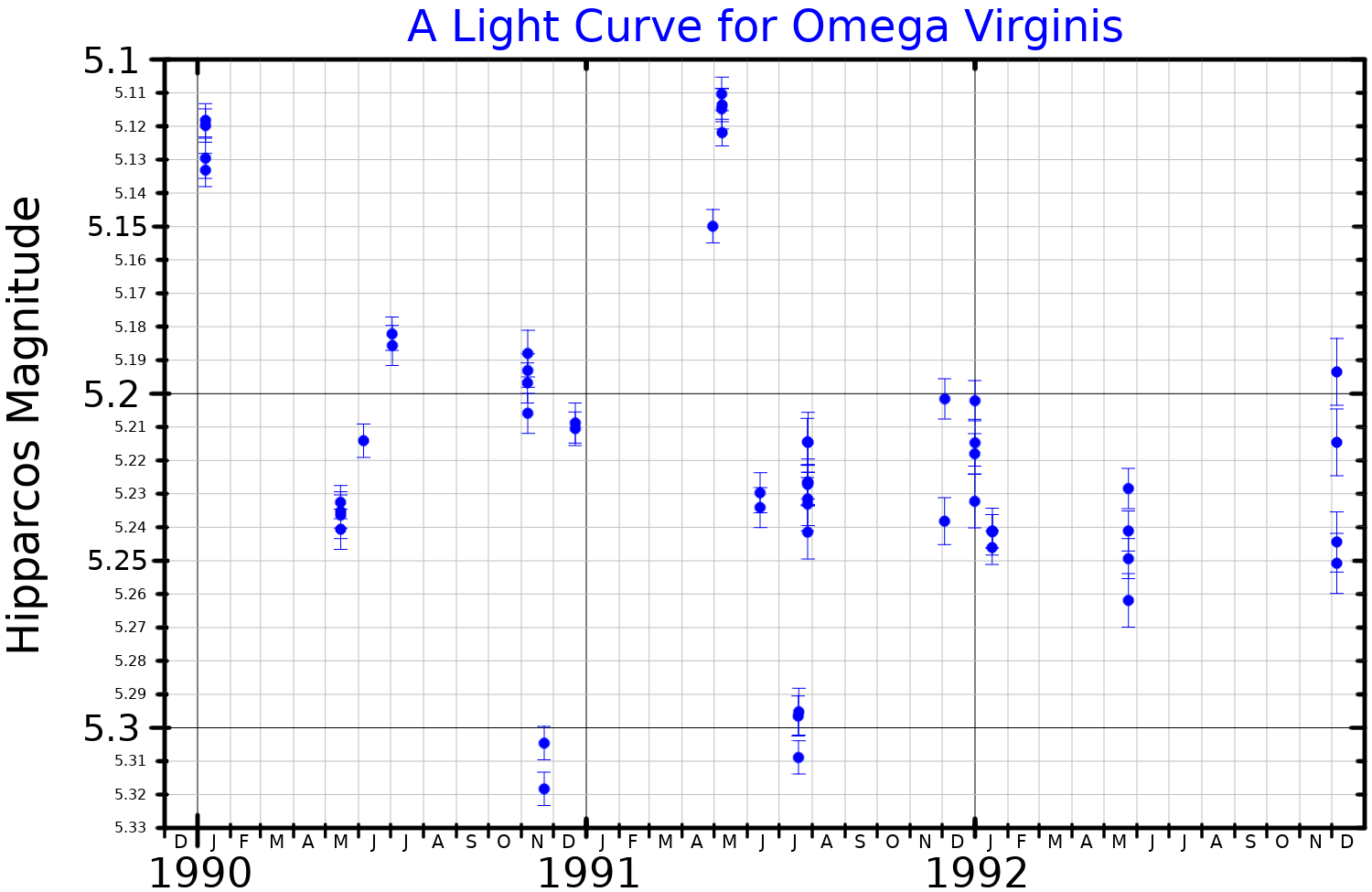
A light curve for Omega Virginis, plotted from Hipparcos data

This is a red giant star with a stellar classification of M4 III. It is thought to be on the asymptotic giant branch (AGB), with shells of hydrogen and helium around a carbon-oxygen core. After evolving away from the main sequence it has expanded to around 140 times the solar radius, and now shines with 2,300 times the luminosity of the Sun. The effective temperature of the photosphere is 3,400 K.

Omega Virginis is a semiregular variable with a brightness that varies over an amplitude of 0.28 with periods of 30 and 275 days. The General Catalogue of Variable Stars gives the magnitude range as 5.23 to 5.50. It was formally declared a variable star in 1972 following a 1969 study showing small-amplitude variations.
