= Sigma Virginis =

Star in the constellation Virgo

σ Virginis
- Location of σ Virginis (circled)

Observation data Epoch J2000 Equinox ICRS
- Constellation: Virgo
- Right ascension: 13^{h} 17^{m} 36.28327^{s}
- Declination: +05° 28′ 11.5221″
- Apparent magnitude (V): 4.86

Characteristics
- Spectral type: M1 III
- U−B color index: +1.86
- B−V color index: +1.62
- Variable type: suspected

Astrometry
Radial velocity (R_{v})	−28.26±0.30 km/s
Proper motion (μ)	RA: −6.06 mas/yr Dec.: +9.14 mas/yr
Parallax (π)	4.83±0.19 mas
Distance	680 ± 30 ly (207 ± 8 pc)
Absolute magnitude (M_{V})	−1.80

Details
Radius	98 R_{☉}
Luminosity	1,610 L_{☉}
Surface gravity (log g)	0.42 cgs
Temperature	3,690 K

Other designations
- σ Vir, 60 Virginis, BD+06°2722, FK5 1344, HD 115521, HIP 64852, HR 5015, SAO 119855

Database references
SIMBAD	data

Sigma Virginis (σ Vir, σ Virginis) is a star in the zodiac constellation of Virgo. It can be faintly seen with the naked eye with a baseline apparent visual magnitude of 4.86. Based upon parallax measurements, the distance to this star is roughly 680 light-years.

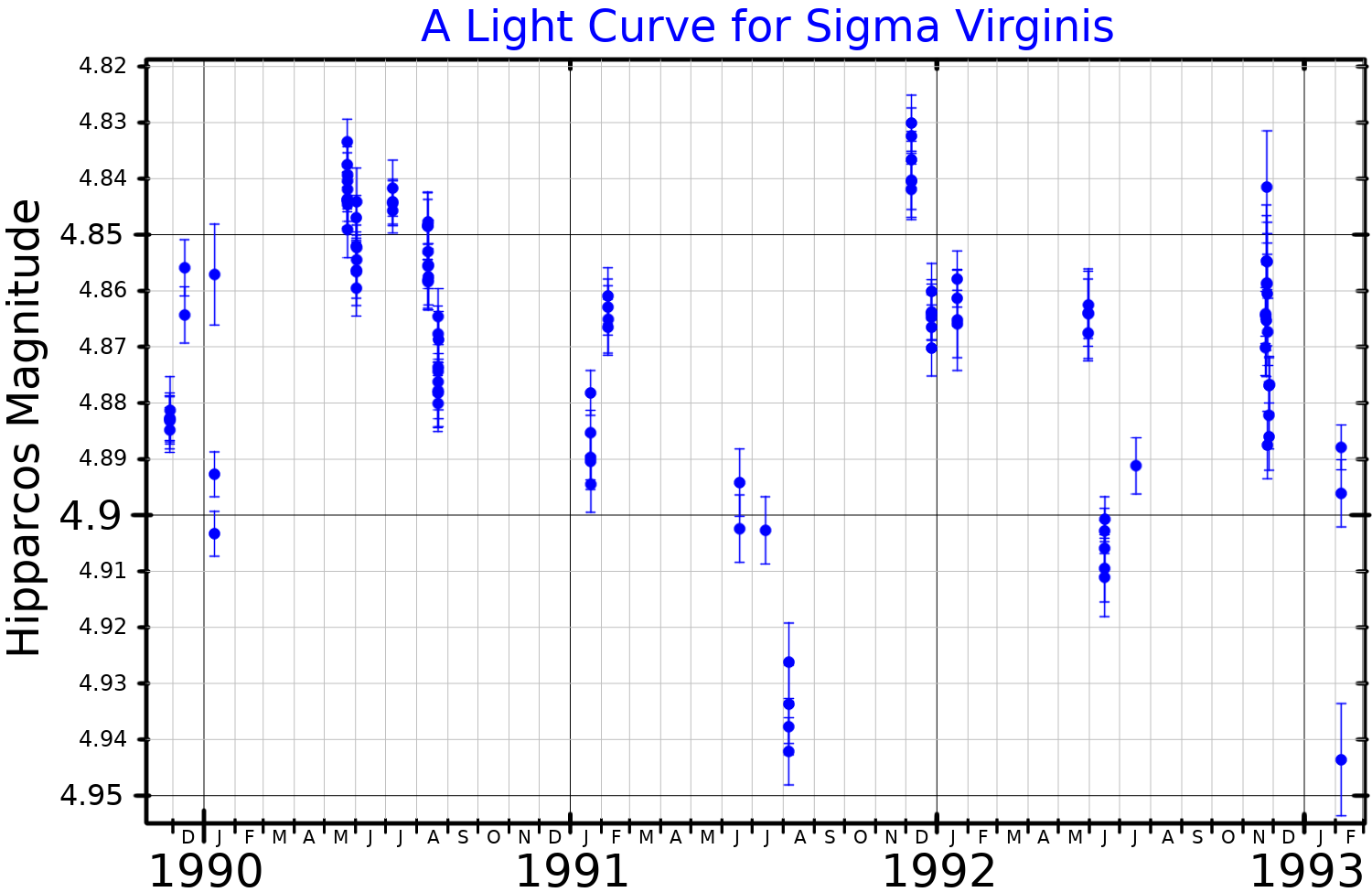
A light curve for Sigma Virginis, plotted from Hipparcos data

This is an evolved red giant star with a stellar classification of M1 III. It is a suspected variable star with a brightness that ranges from magnitude +4.77 to +4.86. This variation has pulsation periods of 23.4, 24.3, 27.9 and 34.1 days. The effective temperature of the stellar atmosphere is around 3,800 K, and it shines with 1,734 times the luminosity of the Sun.
