= Omicron Virginis =

Star in the constellation Virgo

ο Virginis
- Location of ο Virginis (circled)

Observation data Epoch J2000.0 Equinox ICRS
- Constellation: Virgo
- Right ascension: 12^{h} 05^{m} 12.54049^{s}
- Declination: +08° 43′ 58.7498″
- Apparent magnitude (V): 4.12

Characteristics
- Evolutionary stage: Red-giant branch
- Spectral type: G8 IIIa CN-1Ba1CH1

Astrometry
Radial velocity (R_{v})	−29.62 km/s
Proper motion (μ)	RA: −225.029 mas/yr Dec.: +33.282 mas/yr
Parallax (π)	19.4936±0.1658 mas
Distance	167 ± 1 ly (51.3 ± 0.4 pc)
Absolute magnitude (M_{V})	+0.52

Orbit
Primary	A
Name	B
Period (P)	50.70±3.30 yr
Semi-major axis (a)	21.1±1.7 au
Eccentricity (e)	0.12±0.04
Inclination (i)	147.8±1.6°
Longitude of the node (Ω)	34±2°
Periastron epoch (T)	2460663±500
Argument of periastron (ω) (secondary)	180±17°

Details

A
Mass	2.7±0.2 M_{☉}
Radius	11.2±0.3 R_{☉}
Luminosity	57 L_{☉}
Surface gravity (log g)	3.17 cgs
Temperature	5,107 K
Metallicity [Fe/H]	−0.30 dex
Rotational velocity (v sin i)	2.23 km/s
Age	0.88 Gyr

B
Mass	0.94±0.14 M_{☉}

Other designations
- 9 Virginis, ο Vir, BD+09°2583, FK5 450, GJ 3703, HD 104979, HIP 58948, HR 4608, SAO 119213

Database references
SIMBAD	data

Omicron Virginis (ο Vir, ο Virginis) is a binary star in the zodiac constellation of Virgo. It is visible to the naked eye with an apparent visual magnitude of +4.12. Based upon parallax measurements, it is at a distance of 163 light years.

== Characteristics ==
The components are orbiting around the system's center of mass at a period of 50.7 years, and a nearly circular orbit with eccentricity 0.12 and an average separation of 21 astronomical units.

The primary star is a G-type giant with a stellar classification of G8 IIIa CN-1Ba1CH1. This indicates that it is a Barium star. It is around 11 times larger than the Sun. Although it is slightly cooler, it is radiating about 57 times the luminosity of the Sun. It is over twice as massive as the Sun and is around a billion years old. A simplified statistical analysis suggests that ο Virginis is likely to be a red-giant branch star fusing hydrogen in a shell around an inert helium core, but there is about a 22% chance that it is a horizontal branch star fusing helium in its core.

The secondary is a white dwarf with 94% of the Sun's mass. It contamined the surface of the giant primary with s-process elements when it was on the asymptotic giant branch, causing it to be a Barium star. It may also explain the unexpected Si_{IV} emission flux coming from Omicron Virginis.
