= Cetus in Chinese astronomy =

Constellation

The modern constellation Cetus lies across two of the quadrants, symbolized by the Black Tortoise of the North (北方玄武, Běi Fāng Xuán Wǔ) and the White Tiger of the West (西方白虎, Xī Fāng Bái Hǔ), that divide the sky in traditional Chinese uranography.

The name of the western constellation in modern Chinese is 鯨魚座 (jīng yú zuò), meaning "the whale constellation".

== Stars ==
The map of Chinese constellation in constellation Cetus area consists of:

Four Symbols	Mansion (Chinese name)	Romanization	Translation	Asterisms (Chinese name)	Romanization	Translation	Western star name	Proper Name	Chinese star name	Romanization	Translation
Black Tortoise of the North (北方玄武)	室	Shì	Encampment	八魁	Bākuí	Net for Catching Birds					
Black Tortoise of the North (北方玄武)	室	Shì	Encampment	八魁	Bākuí	Net for Catching Birds	6 Cet		八魁一	Bākuíyī	1st star
Black Tortoise of the North (北方玄武)	室	Shì	Encampment	八魁	Bākuí	Net for Catching Birds	2 Cet	Hydor	八魁二	Bākuíèr	2nd star
Black Tortoise of the North (北方玄武)	室	Shì	Encampment	八魁	Bākuí	Net for Catching Birds	1 Cet		八魁三	Bākuísān	3rd star
Black Tortoise of the North (北方玄武)	室	Shì	Encampment	八魁	Bākuí	Net for Catching Birds	3 Cet		八魁四	Bākuísì	4th star
Black Tortoise of the North (北方玄武)	室	Shì	Encampment	八魁	Bākuí	Net for Catching Birds	9 Cet		八魁五	Bākuíwu	5th star
Black Tortoise of the North (北方玄武)	室	Shì	Encampment	八魁	Bākuí	Net for Catching Birds	7 Cet		八魁六	Bākuíliù	6th star
Black Tortoise of the North (北方玄武)	壁	Bì	Wall	鈇鑕	Fūzhì	Sickle					
Black Tortoise of the North (北方玄武)	壁	Bì	Wall	鈇鑕	Fūzhì	Sickle	48 Cet		鈇鑕一	Fūzhìyī	1st star
Black Tortoise of the North (北方玄武)	壁	Bì	Wall	鈇鑕	Fūzhì	Sickle	υ Cet	Alnaamaat	鈇鑕四	Fūzhìsì	4th star
Black Tortoise of the North (北方玄武)	壁	Bì	Wall	鈇鑕	Fūzhì	Sickle	56 Cet		鈇鑕五	Fūzhìwu	5th star
Black Tortoise of the North (北方玄武)	壁	Bì	Wall	土公	Tǔgōng	Official for Earthworks and Buildings					
Black Tortoise of the North (北方玄武)	壁	Bì	Wall	土公	Tǔgōng	Official for Earthworks and Buildings	10 Cet		土公增八	Tǔgōngzēngbā	8th additional star
Black Tortoise of the North (北方玄武)	壁	Bì	Wall	土公	Tǔgōng	Official for Earthworks and Buildings	11 Cet		土公增九	Tǔgōngzēngjiǔ	9th additional star
Black Tortoise of the North (北方玄武)	壁	Bì	Wall	土公	Tǔgōng	Official for Earthworks and Buildings	14 Cet		土公增十	Tǔgōngzēngshí	10th additional star
Black Tortoise of the North (北方玄武)	壁	Bì	Wall	土公	Tǔgōng	Official for Earthworks and Buildings	15 Cet		土公增十一	Tǔgōngzēngshíyī	11th additional star
White Tiger of the West (西方白虎)	奎	Kuí	Legs	外屏	Wàipíng	Outer Fence					
White Tiger of the West (西方白虎)	奎	Kuí	Legs	外屏	Wàipíng	Outer Fence	26 Cet		外屏增十	Wàipíngzēngshí	10th additional star
White Tiger of the West (西方白虎)	奎	Kuí	Legs	外屏	Wàipíng	Outer Fence	29 Cet		外屏增十一	Wàipíngzēngshíyī	11th additional star
White Tiger of the West (西方白虎)	奎	Kuí	Legs	外屏	Wàipíng	Outer Fence	33 Cet		外屏增十二	Wàipíngzēngshíèr	12th additional star
White Tiger of the West (西方白虎)	奎	Kuí	Legs	外屏	Wàipíng	Outer Fence	35 Cet		外屏增十三	Wàipíngzēngshísān	13th additional star
White Tiger of the West (西方白虎)	奎	Kuí	Legs	天溷	Tiānhùn	Celestial Pigsty					
White Tiger of the West (西方白虎)	奎	Kuí	Legs	天溷	Tiānhùn	Celestial Pigsty	21 Cet		天溷一	Tiānhùnyī	1st star
White Tiger of the West (西方白虎)	奎	Kuí	Legs	天溷	Tiānhùn	Celestial Pigsty	φ^{3} Cet		天溷二	Tiānhùnèr	2nd star
White Tiger of the West (西方白虎)	奎	Kuí	Legs	天溷	Tiānhùn	Celestial Pigsty	18 Cet		天溷三	Tiānhùnsān	3rd star
White Tiger of the West (西方白虎)	奎	Kuí	Legs	天溷	Tiānhùn	Celestial Pigsty	φ^{1} Cet		天溷四	Tiānhùnsì	4th star
White Tiger of the West (西方白虎)	奎	Kuí	Legs	天溷	Tiānhùn	Celestial Pigsty	12 Cet		天溷增一	Tiānhùnzēngyī	1st additional star
White Tiger of the West (西方白虎)	奎	Kuí	Legs	天溷	Tiānhùn	Celestial Pigsty	13 Cet		天溷增二	Tiānhùnzēngèr	2nd additional star
White Tiger of the West (西方白虎)	奎	Kuí	Legs	天溷	Tiānhùn	Celestial Pigsty	20 Cet	Tianhun	天溷增三	Tiānhùnzēngsān	3rd additional star
White Tiger of the West (西方白虎)	奎	Kuí	Legs	天溷	Tiānhùn	Celestial Pigsty	25 Cet		天溷增四	Tiānhùnzēngsì	4th additional star
White Tiger of the West (西方白虎)	奎	Kuí	Legs	天溷	Tiānhùn	Celestial Pigsty	φ^{4} Cet		天溷增五	Tiānhùnzēngwǔ	5th additional star
White Tiger of the West (西方白虎)	奎	Kuí	Legs	天溷	Tiānhùn	Celestial Pigsty	φ^{2} Cet		天溷增六	Tiānhùnzēngliù	6th additional star
White Tiger of the West (西方白虎)	奎	Kuí	Legs	土司空	Tǔsīkōng	Master of Constructions					
White Tiger of the West (西方白虎)	奎	Kuí	Legs	土司空	Tǔsīkōng	Master of Constructions	β Cet	Diphda			
White Tiger of the West (西方白虎)	奎	Kuí	Legs	土司空	Tǔsīkōng	Master of Constructions	β Cet	Diphda	土司空	Tǔsīkōng	(One star of)
White Tiger of the West (西方白虎)	奎	Kuí	Legs	土司空	Tǔsīkōng	Master of Constructions	β Cet	Diphda	壁宿南星	Bìsùnánxīng	Star in the south of Wall constellation
White Tiger of the West (西方白虎)	婁	Lóu	Bond	天倉	Tiāncāng	Square Celestial Granary	β Cet	Diphda			
White Tiger of the West (西方白虎)	婁	Lóu	Bond	天倉	Tiāncāng	Square Celestial Granary	ι Cet		天倉一	Tiāncāngyī	1st star
White Tiger of the West (西方白虎)	婁	Lóu	Bond	天倉	Tiāncāng	Square Celestial Granary	η Cet	Gajahmina	天倉二	Tiāncāngèr	2nd star
White Tiger of the West (西方白虎)	婁	Lóu	Bond	天倉	Tiāncāng	Square Celestial Granary	θ Cet	Tiancang	天倉三	Tiāncāngsān	3rd star
White Tiger of the West (西方白虎)	婁	Lóu	Bond	天倉	Tiāncāng	Square Celestial Granary	ζ Cet	Baten Kaitos (for component Aa)	天倉四	Tiāncāngsì	4th star
White Tiger of the West (西方白虎)	婁	Lóu	Bond	天倉	Tiāncāng	Square Celestial Granary	τ Cet		天倉五	Tiāncāngwǔ	5th star
White Tiger of the West (西方白虎)	婁	Lóu	Bond	天倉	Tiāncāng	Square Celestial Granary	57 Cet		天倉六	Tiāncāngliù	6th star
White Tiger of the West (西方白虎)	婁	Lóu	Bond	天倉	Tiāncāng	Square Celestial Granary	43 Cet		天仓增一	Tiāncāngzēngyī	1st additional star
White Tiger of the West (西方白虎)	婁	Lóu	Bond	天倉	Tiāncāng	Square Celestial Granary	42 Cet		天倉增二	Tiāncāngzēngèr	2nd additional star
White Tiger of the West (西方白虎)	婁	Lóu	Bond	天倉	Tiāncāng	Square Celestial Granary	38 Cet		天倉增三	Tiāncāngzēngsān	3rd additional star
White Tiger of the West (西方白虎)	婁	Lóu	Bond	天倉	Tiāncāng	Square Celestial Granary	34 Cet		天倉增四	Tiāncāngzēngsì	4th additional star
White Tiger of the West (西方白虎)	婁	Lóu	Bond	天倉	Tiāncāng	Square Celestial Granary	40 Cet		天倉增五	Tiāncāngzēngwǔ	5th additional star
White Tiger of the West (西方白虎)	婁	Lóu	Bond	天倉	Tiāncāng	Square Celestial Granary	39 Cet		天倉增六	Tiāncāngzēngliù	6th additional star
White Tiger of the West (西方白虎)	婁	Lóu	Bond	天倉	Tiāncāng	Square Celestial Granary	44 Cet		天仓增七	Tiāncāngzēngqī	7th additional star
White Tiger of the West (西方白虎)	婁	Lóu	Bond	天倉	Tiāncāng	Square Celestial Granary	41 Cet		天倉增八	Tiāncāngzēngbā	8th additional star
White Tiger of the West (西方白虎)	婁	Lóu	Bond	天倉	Tiāncāng	Square Celestial Granary	37 Cet		天倉增九	Tiāncāngzēngjiǔ	9th additional star
White Tiger of the West (西方白虎)	婁	Lóu	Bond	天倉	Tiāncāng	Square Celestial Granary	36 Cet		天倉增十	Tiāncāngzēngshí	10th additional star
White Tiger of the West (西方白虎)	婁	Lóu	Bond	天倉	Tiāncāng	Square Celestial Granary	32 Cet		天倉增十一	Tiāncāngzēngshíyī	11th additional star
White Tiger of the West (西方白虎)	婁	Lóu	Bond	天倉	Tiāncāng	Square Celestial Granary	30 Cet		天倉增十二	Tiāncāngzēngshíèr	12th additional star
White Tiger of the West (西方白虎)	婁	Lóu	Bond	天倉	Tiāncāng	Square Celestial Granary	28 Cet		天仓增十三	Tiāncāngzēngshísān	13th additional star
White Tiger of the West (西方白虎)	婁	Lóu	Bond	天倉	Tiāncāng	Square Celestial Granary	27 Cet		天倉增十四	Tiāncāngzēngshísì	14th additional star
White Tiger of the West (西方白虎)	婁	Lóu	Bond	天倉	Tiāncāng	Square Celestial Granary	46 Cet		天倉增十五	Tiāncāngzēngshíwǔ	15th additional star
White Tiger of the West (西方白虎)	婁	Lóu	Bond	天倉	Tiāncāng	Square Celestial Granary	47 Cet		天倉增十六	Tiāncāngzēngshíliù	16th additional star
White Tiger of the West (西方白虎)	婁	Lóu	Bond	天倉	Tiāncāng	Square Celestial Granary	50 Cet		天倉增十七	Tiāncāngzēngshíqī	17th additional star
White Tiger of the West (西方白虎)	婁	Lóu	Bond	天倉	Tiāncāng	Square Celestial Granary	49 Cet		天倉增十八	Tiāncāngzēngshíbā	18th additional star
White Tiger of the West (西方白虎)	婁	Lóu	Bond	天倉	Tiāncāng	Square Celestial Granary	HD 1461		天倉增十九	Tiāncāngzēngshíjiǔ	19th additional star
White Tiger of the West (西方白虎)	婁	Lóu	Bond	天倉	Tiāncāng	Square Celestial Granary	HD 10550		天倉增二十	Tiāncāngzēngèrshí	20th additional star
White Tiger of the West (西方白虎)	婁	Lóu	Bond	天倉	Tiāncāng	Square Celestial Granary	χ Cet A		天倉增二十一	Tiāncāngzēngèrshíyī	21st additional star
White Tiger of the West (西方白虎)	胃	Wèi	Stomach	天囷	Tiānqūn	Circular Celestial Granary					
White Tiger of the West (西方白虎)	胃	Wèi	Stomach	天囷	Tiānqūn	Circular Celestial Granary	α Cet	Menkar			
White Tiger of the West (西方白虎)	胃	Wèi	Stomach	天囷	Tiānqūn	Circular Celestial Granary	α Cet	Menkar	天囷一	Tiānqūnyī	1st star
White Tiger of the West (西方白虎)	胃	Wèi	Stomach	天囷	Tiānqūn	Circular Celestial Granary	α Cet	Menkar	天囷大星	Tiānqūndàxīng	Big star
White Tiger of the West (西方白虎)	胃	Wèi	Stomach	天囷	Tiānqūn	Circular Celestial Granary	α Cet	Menkar	六甲南星	Liùjiánánxīng	Star in the south of Six Jia constellation
White Tiger of the West (西方白虎)	胃	Wèi	Stomach	天囷	Tiānqūn	Circular Celestial Granary	κ^{1} Cet		天囷二	Tiānqūnèr	2nd star
White Tiger of the West (西方白虎)	胃	Wèi	Stomach	天囷	Tiānqūn	Circular Celestial Granary	λ Cet		天囷三	Tiānqūnsān	3rd star
White Tiger of the West (西方白虎)	胃	Wèi	Stomach	天囷	Tiānqūn	Circular Celestial Granary	μ Cet		天囷四	Tiānqūnsì	4th star
White Tiger of the West (西方白虎)	胃	Wèi	Stomach	天囷	Tiānqūn	Circular Celestial Granary	ξ^{1} Cet	Bawy (for component A)	天囷五	Tiānqūnwǔ	5th star
White Tiger of the West (西方白虎)	胃	Wèi	Stomach	天囷	Tiānqūn	Circular Celestial Granary	ξ^{2} Cet		天囷六	Tiānqūnliù	6th star
White Tiger of the West (西方白虎)	胃	Wèi	Stomach	天囷	Tiānqūn	Circular Celestial Granary	ν Cet		天囷七	Tiānqūnqī	7th star
White Tiger of the West (西方白虎)	胃	Wèi	Stomach	天囷	Tiānqūn	Circular Celestial Granary	γ Cet	Kaffaljidhma (for component A)	天囷八	Tiānqūnbā	8th star
White Tiger of the West (西方白虎)	胃	Wèi	Stomach	天囷	Tiānqūn	Circular Celestial Granary	δ Cet		天囷九	Tiānqūnjiǔ	9th star
White Tiger of the West (西方白虎)	胃	Wèi	Stomach	天囷	Tiānqūn	Circular Celestial Granary	75 Cet		天囷十	Tiānqūnshí	10th star
White Tiger of the West (西方白虎)	胃	Wèi	Stomach	天囷	Tiānqūn	Circular Celestial Granary	70 Cet		天囷十一	Tiānqūnshíyī	11th star
White Tiger of the West (西方白虎)	胃	Wèi	Stomach	天囷	Tiānqūn	Circular Celestial Granary	63 Cet		天囷十二	Tiānqūnshíèr	12th star
White Tiger of the West (西方白虎)	胃	Wèi	Stomach	天囷	Tiānqūn	Circular Celestial Granary	66 Cet		天囷十三	Tiānqūnshísān	13th star
White Tiger of the West (西方白虎)	胃	Wèi	Stomach	天囷	Tiānqūn	Circular Celestial Granary	62 Cet		天囷增一	Tiānqūnzēngyī	1st additional star
White Tiger of the West (西方白虎)	胃	Wèi	Stomach	天囷	Tiānqūn	Circular Celestial Granary	58 Cet		天囷增二	Tiānqūnzēngèr	2nd additional star
White Tiger of the West (西方白虎)	胃	Wèi	Stomach	天囷	Tiānqūn	Circular Celestial Granary	61 Cet		天囷增三	Tiānqūnzēngsān	3rd additional star
White Tiger of the West (西方白虎)	胃	Wèi	Stomach	天囷	Tiānqūn	Circular Celestial Granary	60 Cet		天囷增四	Tiānqūnzēngsì	4th additional star
White Tiger of the West (西方白虎)	胃	Wèi	Stomach	天囷	Tiānqūn	Circular Celestial Granary	69 Cet		天囷增五	Tiānqūnzēngwǔ	5th additional star
White Tiger of the West (西方白虎)	胃	Wèi	Stomach	天囷	Tiānqūn	Circular Celestial Granary	64 Cet		天囷增六	Tiānqūnzēngliù	6th additional star
White Tiger of the West (西方白虎)	胃	Wèi	Stomach	天囷	Tiānqūn	Circular Celestial Granary	93 Cet		天囷增十	Tiānqūnzēngshí	10th additional star
White Tiger of the West (西方白虎)	胃	Wèi	Stomach	天囷	Tiānqūn	Circular Celestial Granary	95 Cet		天囷增十六	Tiānqūnzēngshíliù	16th additional star
White Tiger of the West (西方白虎)	胃	Wèi	Stomach	天囷	Tiānqūn	Circular Celestial Granary	94 Cet		天囷增十七	Tiānqūnzēngshíqī	17th additional star
White Tiger of the West (西方白虎)	胃	Wèi	Stomach	天囷	Tiānqūn	Circular Celestial Granary	84 Cet		天囷二十	Tiānqūnèrshí	20th additional star
White Tiger of the West (西方白虎)	昴	Mǎo	Hairy Head	芻蒿	Chúhāo	Hay					
White Tiger of the West (西方白虎)	昴	Mǎo	Hairy Head	芻蒿	Chúhāo	Hay	ρ Cet	Chugao	芻蒿一	Chúhāoyī	1st star
White Tiger of the West (西方白虎)	昴	Mǎo	Hairy Head	芻蒿	Chúhāo	Hay	77 Cet		芻蒿二	Chúhāoèr	2nd star
White Tiger of the West (西方白虎)	昴	Mǎo	Hairy Head	芻蒿	Chúhāo	Hay	67 Cet		芻蒿三	Chúhāosān	3rd star
White Tiger of the West (西方白虎)	昴	Mǎo	Hairy Head	芻蒿	Chúhāo	Hay	71 Cet		芻蒿四	Chúhāosì	4th star
White Tiger of the West (西方白虎)	昴	Mǎo	Hairy Head	芻蒿	Chúhāo	Hay	HD 14691		芻蒿五	Chúhāowǔ	5th star
White Tiger of the West (西方白虎)	昴	Mǎo	Hairy Head	芻蒿	Chúhāo	Hay	ε Cet		芻蒿六	Chúhāoliù	6th star
White Tiger of the West (西方白虎)	昴	Mǎo	Hairy Head	芻蒿	Chúhāo	Hay	o Cet	Mira	芻蒿增二	Chúhāozēngèr	2nd additional star
White Tiger of the West (西方白虎)	昴	Mǎo	Hairy Head	天苑	Tiānyuàn	Celestial Meadows					
White Tiger of the West (西方白虎)	昴	Mǎo	Hairy Head	天苑	Tiānyuàn	Celestial Meadows	π Cet		天苑七	Tiānyuànqī	7th star
White Tiger of the West (西方白虎)	昴	Mǎo	Hairy Head	天苑	Tiānyuàn	Celestial Meadows	HD 15097		天苑增七	Tiānyuànzēngqī	7th additional star
White Tiger of the West (西方白虎)	昴	Mǎo	Hairy Head	天苑	Tiānyuàn	Celestial Meadows	σ Cet		天苑增九	Tiānyuànzēngjiǔ	9th additional star

== See also ==
- Chinese astronomy
- Traditional Chinese star names
- Chinese constellations
