= Tau Ceti f =

Candidate super-Earth orbiting Tau Ceti

Discovery
- Discovery date: December 19, 2012
- Detection method: Doppler spectroscopy

Orbital characteristics
- Semi-major axis: 1.334 au
- Eccentricity: 0.16
- Orbital period (sidereal): 1.7 y
- Star: Tau Ceti

Physical characteristics
- Mean radius: ~1.81 R_{🜨} (estimate)
- Mass: ≥3.93 M_{🜨}
- Surface gravity: ≥1.201 g ≥11.78 m/s^{2}

Tau Ceti f is a candidate super-Earth or mini-Neptune orbiting Tau Ceti that was discovered in 2012 by statistical analyses of the star's variations in radial velocity, based on data obtained using HIRES, AAPS, and HARPS. It is of interest because its orbit places it in Tau Ceti's extended habitable zone, but a 2015 study implies that there may not be a detectable biosignature because it has only been in the temperate zone for less than one billion years. In 2017, it was again recovered from radial-velocity data, along with Tau Ceti e. Despite this, it remains unconfirmed and disputed.

== Characteristics ==
Few properties of the planet are known other than its orbit and mass. It orbits Tau Ceti at a distance of 1.35 AU (roughly Mars's perihelion in the Solar System) with an orbital period of 642 days, and has a minimum mass of 3.93 Earth masses. However, if it and its companion planets were similarly inclined to Tau Ceti's debris disk at 35±10°, f could 5.56+1.48
−1.94 and 9.30+2.48
−3.24 Earth masses, which means it's slightly more likely to be a mini-Neptune, although the exoplanet is included in the conservative sample of potentially habitable exoplanets. It is estimated to be 1.81 Earth radii.

A 2021 study was unable to confirm this planet, finding instead that its signal is most likely an instrumental artifact combined with a previously unknown 1000-day signal.

== Habitability ==
As of October 2020, Tau Ceti f is considered the most potentially habitable exoplanet orbiting a Sun-like star. Its neighbor, Tau Ceti e, was previously regarded as a potentially habitable exoplanet in the conservative sample, but it was determined to likely be too hot to hold life, more similar to Venus. It and its companion may suffer from a continuous bombardment of asteroids, up to 10 times higher than in the Solar System, but a conjectured (super-)Jovian planet as outlined in a 2019 Astronomy & Astrophysics paper may be shepherding the disk, as it may be as close as 3 AU and as far away as 20.

Tau Ceti f has a somewhat eccentric orbit, varying from approximately 1.12 to 1.547 AU. Therefore, Tau Ceti f receives ~20.3% ± 0.41% Earth flux at apocenter and ~38.86% ± 0.796% Earth flux at pericenter, for an average of ~27.42% ± 0.562% Earth flux. Tau Ceti f has an estimated equilibrium temperature of only 190 Kelvin. If the conditions were the same as on the Earth, Tau Ceti f's average temperature would be around -50 °C. However, with a thicker atmosphere and a larger ocean, the temperature could resemble Earth's.

== In fiction ==
Tau Ceti f is the setting of Directive 8020, a 2026 science-fiction survival horror video game by Supermassive Games, in which the colony ship Cassiopeia travels to the planet as part of a mission to find a potential new home for humanity.

== See also ==
- Sub-Neptune
