= Black Turtle-Snake =

Chinese mythology symbol

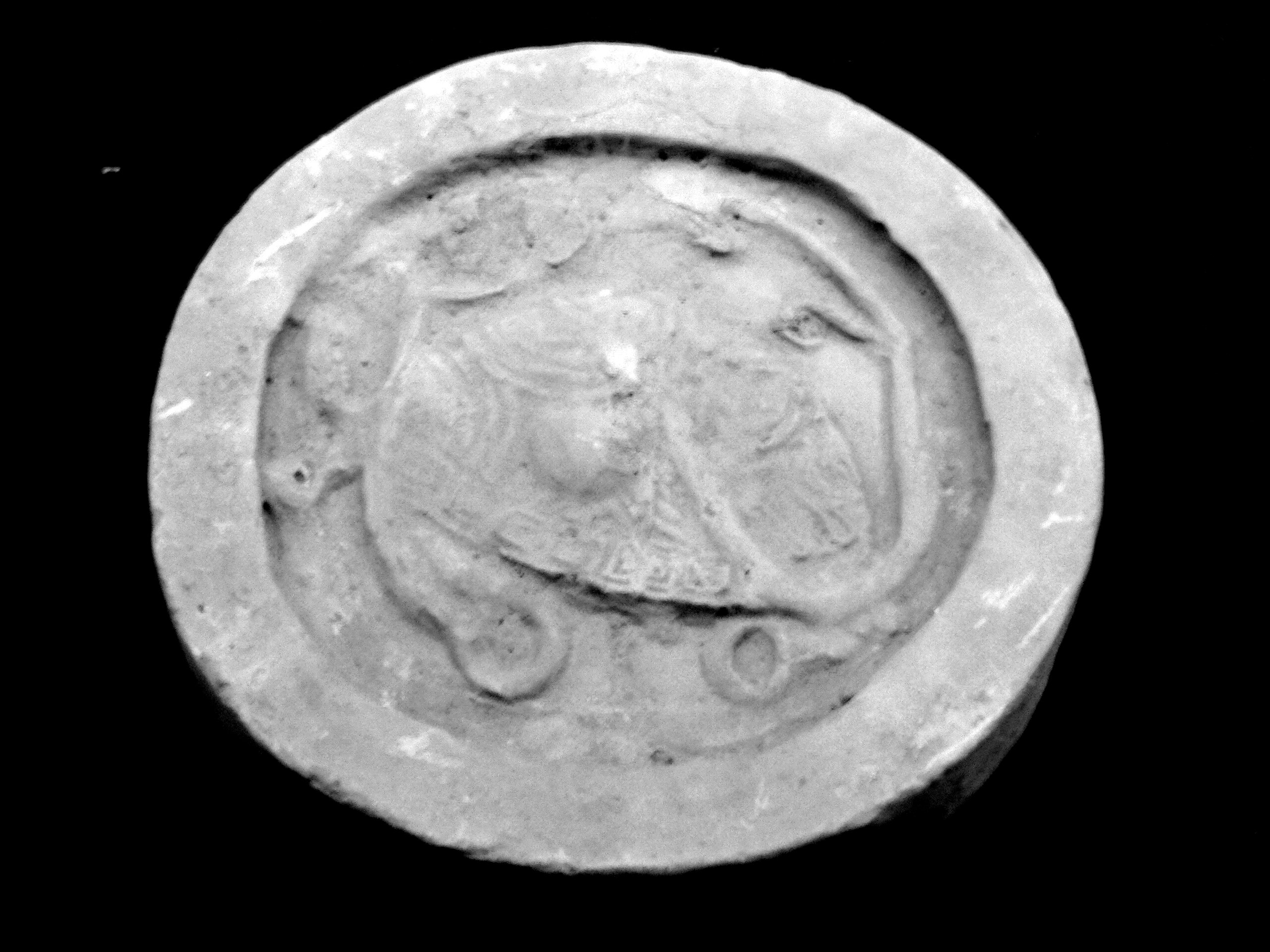
- The Black Turtle-Snake depicted on a Chinese tile

Chinese name
- Chinese: 玄武
- Literal meaning: Mysterious ~ Dark ~ Black Warrior
Transcriptions
Standard Mandarin
- Hanyu Pinyin: Xuánwǔ
Yue: Cantonese
- Yale Romanization: yun4 mou5
Southern Min
- Hokkien POJ: gôan-bú

Vietnamese name
- Vietnamese alphabet: Huyền Vũ
- Chữ Hán: 玄武

Korean name
- Hangul: 현무
- Hanja: 玄武
Transcriptions
- Revised Romanization: Hyeonmu
- McCune–Reischauer: Hyŏnmu

Japanese name
- Kanji: 玄武
- Hiragana: げんぶ
Transcriptions
- Revised Hepburn: Genbu
- Kunrei-shiki: Genbu

Black Warrior of the North
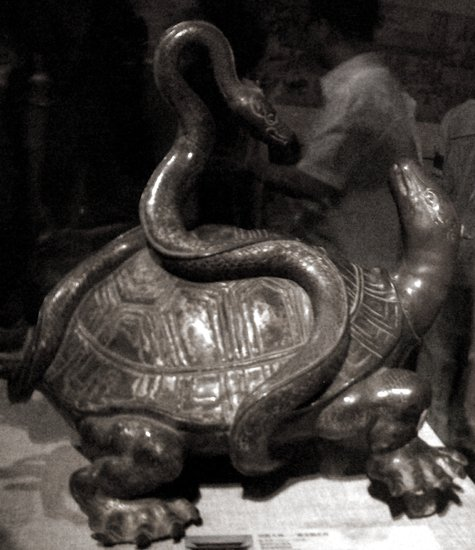
- A copper Black Turtle-Snake from the Yongle era of the Ming dynasty (early 15th century)
- Chinese: 北方玄武
Transcriptions
Standard Mandarin
- Hanyu Pinyin: Běifāng Xuánwǔ

The Black Turtle-Snake (Chinese: 玄武; pinyin: Xuánwǔ) is one of the Four Symbols of the Chinese constellations. It is usually depicted as a tortoise or turtle, intertwined with a snake.

According to Eastern Han philologist Xu Shen, the character wu (武) meant "knight" (士; shì ) in the Jianghuai dialect. So the English translation Black ~ Dark ~ Mysterious Warrior is a more faithful translation.

It represents the north, thus it is sometimes called Black Warrior of the North (北方玄武; Běifāng Xuánwǔ).

While neither character xuan (玄) or wu (武) literally means turtle, tortoise or snake, tortoises and snakes are known to hibernate during winter, so xuanwu (玄武) as a whole represents the season of winter.

The image of intertwined tortoise (or turtle) and snake likely symbolizes a state of inner struggle.

In Japan, the characters xuanwu (玄武) are pronounced as Genbu. It is said to protect Kyoto on the north side, being one of the four guardian spirits that protect the city. It is represented by the Kenkun Shrine, which is located on top of Mount Funaoka in Kyoto.

An important Taoist priest also has Xuanwu (玄武) as his clergy name. He is sometimes, as in Journey to the West, portrayed in the company of a turtle and a snake.

== History ==
During the Han dynasty, people often wore jade pendants that were in the shape of turtles. Originally, there was a legend that said that turtles could not mate with other turtles, only snakes. This is why the Black Turtle-Snake is depicted as an intertwining turtle and a snake.

The northern gates of Chinese palaces were often named after the Xuanwu. Most famously, the Incident at Xuanwu Gate, where Li Shimin killed his brothers Jiancheng and Yuanji and seized power in a coup, took place at the north gate of the Taiji Palace, in the north of Chang'an.

== Legends ==
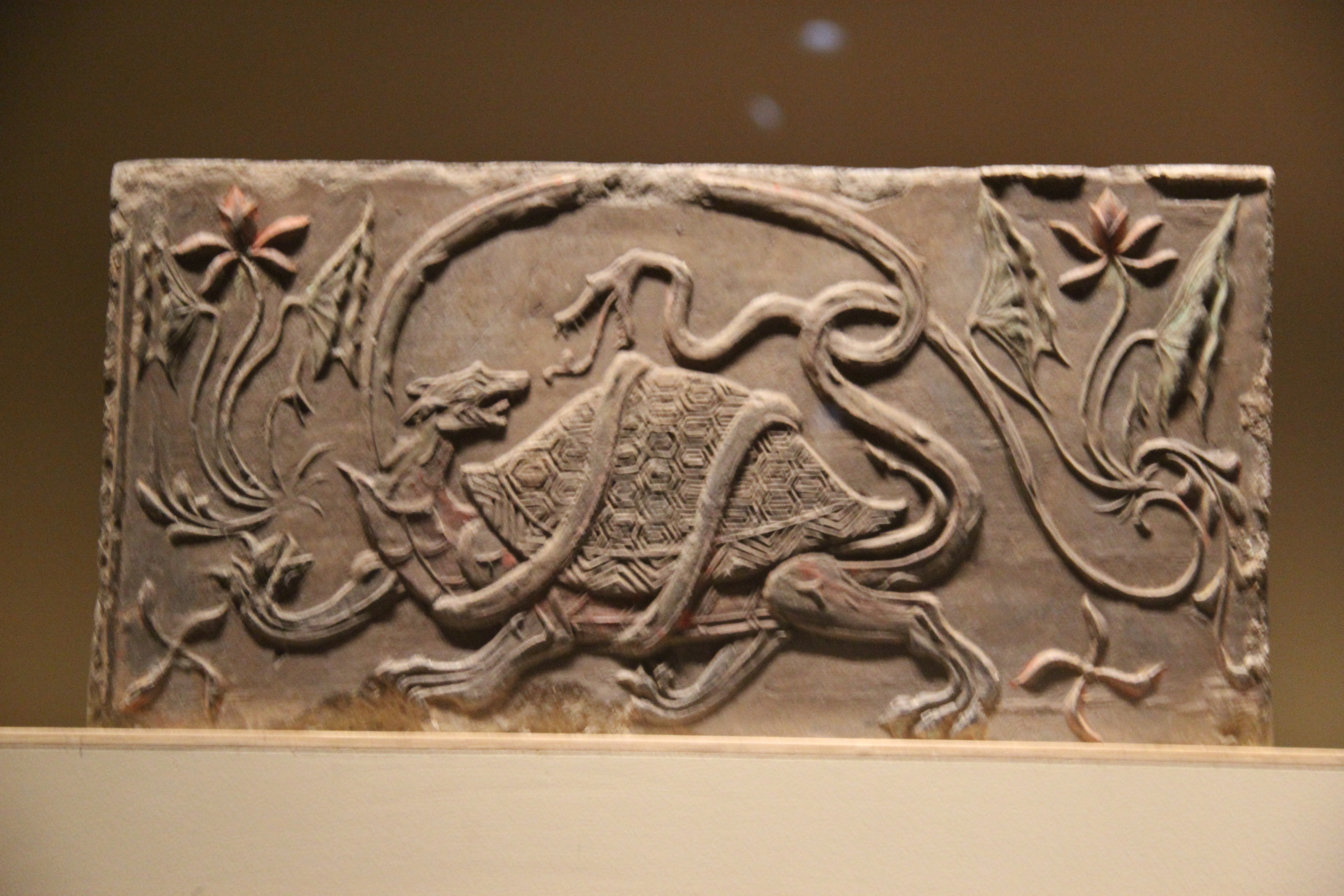
Black Tortoise with Snake. Southern Dynasties Brick Relief 11.

In ancient China, the tortoise (or turtle) and the serpent were thought to be spiritual creatures symbolizing longevity. The Min people custom of building turtle-shaped tombs may have had to do with the desire to place the grave under the influence of the Black Turtle-Snake.

=== Xuanwu ===
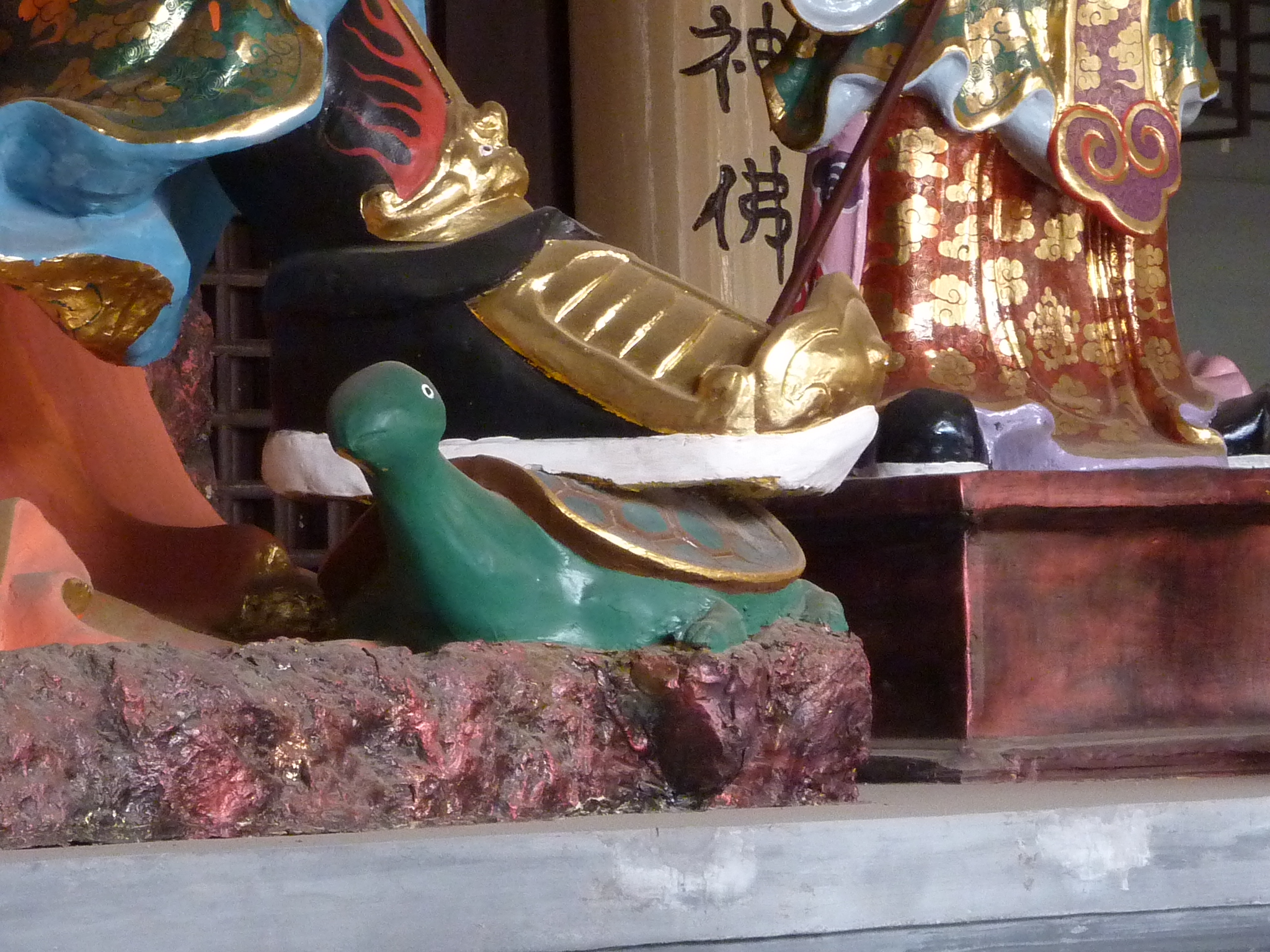
Xuanwu subduing the tortoise. Wudang Palace, Yangzhou.

In the classic novel Journey to the West, Xuanwu was a king of the north who had two generals serving under him, a "Tortoise General" and a "Snake General". This god had a temple in the Wudang Mountains of Hubei, and there are now a "Tortoise Mountain" and a "Snake Mountain" on opposite sides of a river near Wuhan, Hubei's capital. Taoist legend has it that Xuanwu was the prince of a Chinese ruler but was not interested in taking the throne, opting instead to leave his parents at age 16 and study Taoism. According to the legend, he eventually achieved divine status and was worshiped as a deity of the northern sky.

Other Chinese legends also speak of how the "Tortoise General" and a "Snake General" came to be. During Xuanwu's study to achieve enlightenment and divine status, he was told that, in order to fully achieve divinity, he must purge all human flesh from his body. Since he had always eaten the food of the world, despite all his efforts, his stomach and intestines were still human. A god then came and changed his organs with divine ones. Once removed, the original stomach and intestines were said to have become a tortoise and a snake, respectively. The tortoise and snake became demons and terrorized people. Now divine, Xuanwu heard of this and returned to slay the monsters he had unleashed on the countryside. However, as the snake and tortoise showed remorse, he did not kill them but instead let them train under him to atone for their wrongdoings. They then became the Tortoise and Snake generals and assisted Xuanwu with his quests (another legend held that the mortal organs were tossed out to become Wuhan's Tortoise and Snake mountains).

According to another source, once Xuanwu had begun his study of the Way, he discovered that he must purge himself of all of his past sins to become a god. He learned to achieve this by washing his stomach and intestines in the river. Washing his internal organs, his sins dissolved into the water in a dark, black form. These then formed into a black tortoise and a snake who terrorized the country. Once Xuanwu learned of this, he returned to subdue them as in the other story.

== Seven Mansions of the Black Turtle-Snake ==
As with the other three Symbols, there are seven astrological "Mansions" (positions of the Moon) within the Black Turtle-Snake. The names and determinative stars are:

Mansion no.	Name	Pinyin	Translation	Determinative star
8	斗	Dǒu	(Southern) Dipper	φ Sgr
9	牛	Niú	Ox	β Cap
10	女	Nǚ	Girl	ε Aqr
11	虛	Xū	Emptiness	β Aqr
12	危	Wēi	Rooftop	α Aqr
13	室	Shì	Encampment	α Peg
14	壁	Bì	Wall	γ Peg

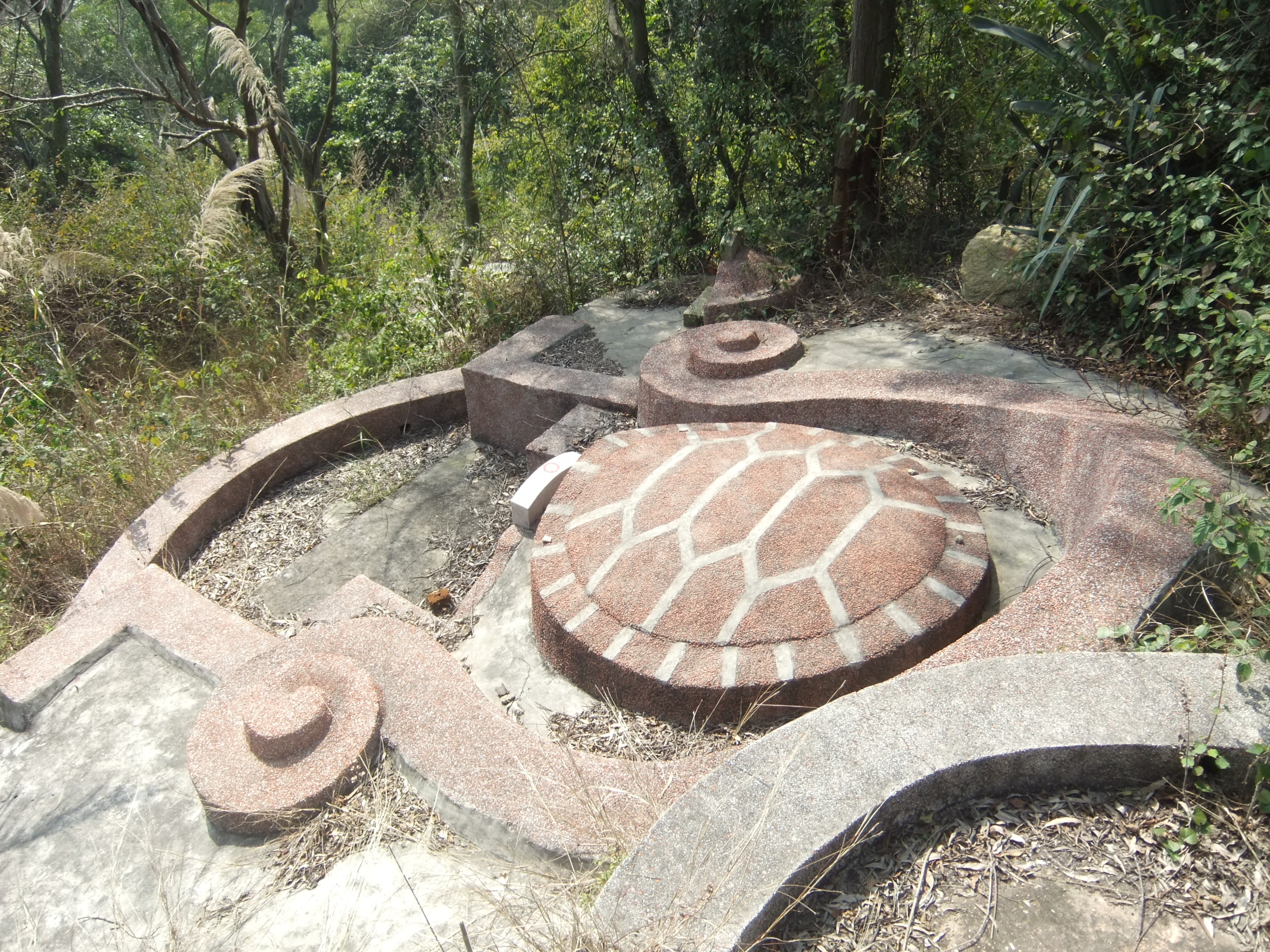
A characteristic "turtle-back tomb" in Quanzhou, Fujian

== See also ==
- Ao – the great turtle of early Chinese mythology
- Bixi – the son of the Dragon King who supports Chinese stelæ
- Cetus in Chinese astronomy – Cetus and Black Turtle-Snake correspond on astrology, and both creatures possess affinities to waters and travel to underworlds to guide people
- Dragon turtle – a similar creature
- Fushigi Yûgi: Genbu Kaiden
- Gamera – the fictional kaiju being repeatedly referenced to the Black Turtle-Snake
