= Dragon turtle =

Legendary Chinese creature

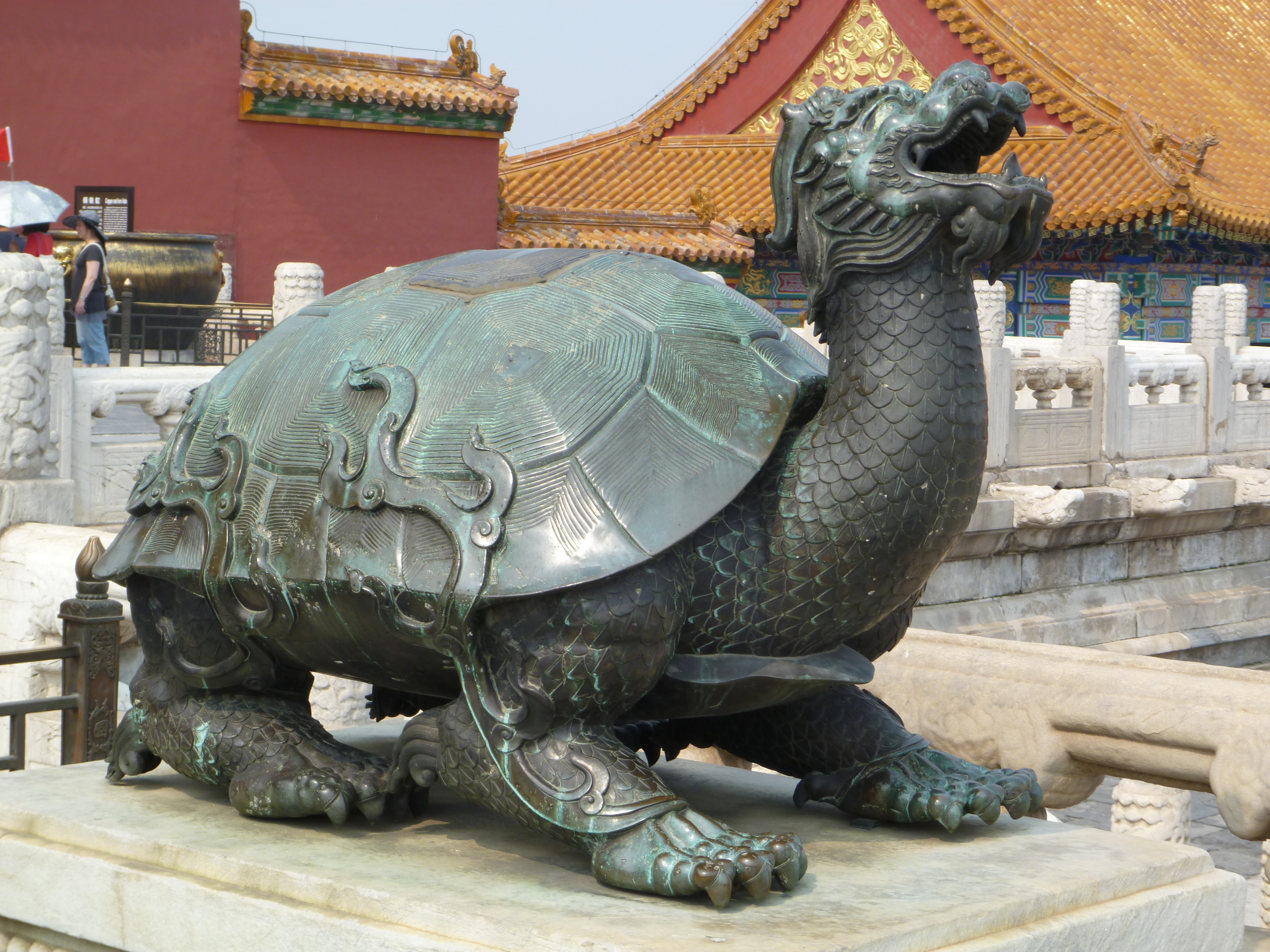
A statue of a dragon turtle in China

A dragon turtle (Chinese : 龍龜, pinyin : Lóngguī) is a legendary Chinese creature that combines two of the four celestial animals of Chinese mythology: the shell of a turtle with a dragon's body is promoted as a positive ornament in Feng Shui, symbolizing courage, determination, fertility, longevity, power, success, and support. Decorative carvings or statuettes of the creature are traditionally placed facing the window.

Mapmakers sometimes drew dragon turtles along with other fantastical creatures in unexplored areas.

== Ancient mythology ==
When Fuxi wanted to create more divine patterns, He discovered a "square diagram" on the back of a dragon turtle.

== In popular culture ==
=== Tabletop games ===
- Dragon turtles have been present in the tabletop roleplaying game Dungeons & Dragons from its inception to its current 5th edition.

=== TV ===
- In the animated series Avatar: The Last Airbender, a lion turtle, a gigantic creature which greatly resembles the dragon turtle, appears to grant the protagonist Aang spiritual guidance and special powers.
- A dragon turtle appears in the 1983 Dungeons & Dragons cartoon episode, "The Garden of Zinn", its poisonous bite setting up the events of the episode. These creatures have a dragon body and turtle shell, with some types having flippers.

=== Video games ===
- The character of Yachie Kicchou (吉弔 八千慧), from the 17th mainline video game of the Touhou Project series, is an anthropomorphic tortoise dragon.

== See also ==
- Bixi - one of the 9 sons of the Dragon King
- Chinese mythology in popular culture
- Black Tortoise
- Fuxi - the progenitor of the human race in Chinese mythology.
