= 14 Ceti =

Star in the constellation Cetus

Observation data Epoch J2000 Equinox ICRS
- Constellation: Cetus
- Right ascension: 00^{h} 35^{m} 32.833^{s}
- Declination: −00° 30′ 20.20″
- Apparent magnitude (V): 5.84

Characteristics
- Evolutionary stage: subgiant
- Spectral type: F5 V or F5 IV
- B−V color index: 0.444±0.006

Astrometry
Radial velocity (R_{v})	+11.3±0.2 km/s
Proper motion (μ)	RA: +143.173 mas/yr Dec.: −62.295 mas/yr
Parallax (π)	17.4181±0.0314 mas
Distance	187.3 ± 0.3 ly (57.4 ± 0.1 pc)
Absolute magnitude (M_{V})	2.26±0.04

Details
Mass	1.55±0.1 M_{☉}
Radius	2.6 R_{☉}
Luminosity	10.7 L_{☉}
Surface gravity (log g)	3.87±0.15 cgs
Temperature	6,583±90 K
Metallicity [Fe/H]	−0.11±0.06 dex
Rotational velocity (v sin i)	5 km/s
Age	2.1±0.4 Gyr

Other designations
- 14 Cet, BD−01°68, FK5 2036, GC 701, HD 3229, HIP 2787, HR 143, SAO 128843

Database references
SIMBAD	data

14 Ceti is a single star in the equatorial constellation of Cetus. It is faintly visible to the naked eye under good viewing conditions, having an apparent visual magnitude of 5.84. The distance to 14 Ceti can be estimated from its annual parallax shift of 17.4″, which puts it 187 light years away. It is moving further from the Earth with a heliocentric radial velocity of +11 km/s, having recently come no closer than 178 ly.

Gray (1989) as well as Houk and Swift (1999) have this star classified as an F-type main-sequence star with a stellar classification of F5 V. However, in the 5th revised edition of the Bright Star Catalogue it was classed by Hoffleit and Warren (1991) as a more evolved subgiant star with a class of F5 IV. The absolute magnitude and effective temperature for this star shows that it is entering the Hertzsprung gap, which is occupied by a class of stars that have consumed the hydrogen at their core but have not yet begun hydrogen fusion along a shell surrounding the center.

Evolutionary models for this star give an estimated age of around 2.1 billion years with 1.6 times the mass of the Sun. It has 2.6 times the Sun's radius and is radiating 10.7 times the Sun's luminosity from its photosphere at an effective temperature of about 6,583 K. There is a thin convective envelope near its surface. The star has a lower abundance of elements more massive than helium – what astronomers' term the metallicity – compared to the Sun. The projected rotational velocity is a relatively low 5 km/s, but the rotation rate is unknown since the axial tilt hasn't been determined.

14 Ceti shows an X-ray emission of 0.33×10^{30} erg s^{−1}, which is on the high side for an F5 star. Both the corona and chromosphere of this star show indications of a magnetic field, and a surface field was detected in 2009 with a strength of −30 G. This made it the only known star between classes F0 and F7 to have a Zeeman effect detected. Two possible explanations for this field are that it is a fast rotator with a dynamo-driven field, or that it is a former Ap star. The activity properties of this star make it more likely to be the latter.
