= 69 Ceti =

Star in the constellation Cetus

Observation data Epoch J2000 Equinox J2000
- Constellation: Cetus
- Right ascension: 02^{h} 21^{m} 56.62838^{s}
- Declination: +00° 23′ 44.4288″
- Apparent magnitude (V): 5.287

Characteristics
- Evolutionary stage: AGB
- Spectral type: M1/2III
- U−B color index: +1.85
- B−V color index: +1.65

Astrometry
Radial velocity (R_{v})	+26.99±0.32 km/s
Proper motion (μ)	RA: −12.393 mas/yr Dec.: −8.059 mas/yr
Parallax (π)	3.7821±0.2323 mas
Distance	860 ± 50 ly (260 ± 20 pc)
Absolute magnitude (M_{V})	−2.73

Details
Radius	100+10 −18 R_{☉}
Luminosity	1,813±126 L_{☉}
Temperature	3,765+392 −177 K

Other designations
- 69 Cet, BD−00°355, HD 14652, HIP 11021, HR 689, SAO 110495

Database references
SIMBAD	data

69 Ceti is a single star located around 860 light years away in the equatorial constellation of Cetus. It is visible to the naked eye with an apparent visual magnitude of 5.3. This is an aging red giant star with a stellar classification of M1/2III. It is radiating 1,813 times the Sun's luminosity from an enlarged photosphere, 100 times the Sun's radius, at an effective temperature of 3,765 K.
