= 20 Ceti =

Star in the constellation Cetus

- Location of 20 Ceti (circled in red)

Observation data Epoch J2000 Equinox ICRS
- Constellation: Cetus
- Right ascension: 00^{h} 53^{m} 00.49452^{s}
- Declination: −01° 08′ 39.3317″
- Apparent magnitude (V): 4.76

Characteristics
- Spectral type: K5 III
- U−B color index: +1.91
- B−V color index: +1.56

Astrometry
Radial velocity (R_{v})	+16.22±0.28 km/s
Proper motion (μ)	RA: +6.99 mas/yr Dec.: −15.66 mas/yr
Parallax (π)	5.56±0.22 mas
Distance	590 ± 20 ly (180 ± 7 pc)
Absolute magnitude (M_{V})	−1.58

Details
Mass	1.1 M_{☉}
Radius	65.93+2.13 −2.25 R_{☉}
Luminosity	754.8±52.6 L_{☉}
Surface gravity (log g)	1.61 cgs
Temperature	4,065 K
Metallicity [Fe/H]	−0.19 dex

Other designations
- Tianhun, 20 Cet, BD−01°114, FK5 1022, HD 5112, HIP 4147, HR 248, SAO 129009

Database references
SIMBAD	data

20 Ceti, also named Tianhun, is a single star located around 590 light-years away in the equatorial constellation of Cetus. It is faintly visible to the naked eye with apparent magnitude is 4.76. The Bright Star Catalogue has this star classified as M0III, matching an aging red giant star that has consumed the hydrogen at its core and expanded. Houk and Swift (1999) listed an earlier class of K5 III. It has around 66 times the Sun's radius and is radiating about 750 times the Sun's luminosity from its enlarged photosphere at an effective temperature of 4,065 K.

In Chinese astronomy, this star is part of the asterism Tiān Hùn (天溷), Celestial Pigsty. The IAU Working Group on Star Names adopted the name Tianhun for this star on 15 October 2026.
