= 7 Ceti =

Star in the constellation Cetus

- Location of 7 Ceti (circled in red)

Observation data Epoch J2000 Equinox ICRS
- Constellation: Cetus
- Right ascension: 00^{h} 14^{m} 38.41655^{s}
- Declination: −18° 55′ 58.3145″
- Apparent magnitude (V): 4.26–4.46

Characteristics
- Evolutionary stage: AGB
- Spectral type: M1 III
- B−V color index: 1.640±0.044
- Variable type: LB:

Astrometry
Radial velocity (R_{v})	−22.9±1.0 km/s
Proper motion (μ)	RA: −26.15 mas/yr Dec.: −73.58 mas/yr
Parallax (π)	7.29±0.28 mas
Distance	450 ± 20 ly (137 ± 5 pc)
Absolute magnitude (M_{V})	–1.24

Details
Radius	69 R_{☉}
Luminosity	1,011 L_{☉}
Surface gravity (log g)	0.77 cgs
Temperature	3,909 K
Metallicity [Fe/H]	+0.50 dex

Other designations
- 3 Cet, AE Ceti, BD−19°21, HD 1038, HIP 1170, HR 48, SAO 147169

Database references
SIMBAD	data

7 Ceti is a single, variable star in the equatorial constellation of Cetus. It has the variable star designation AE Ceti. The star is visible to the naked eye with an apparent visual magnitude varying around 4.3 to 4.4. Based upon an annual parallax shift of only 7.3 mas, it is located roughly 450 light years away. It is moving closer to the Sun with a heliocentric radial velocity of −23 km/s. Eggen (1965) listed it as a probable member of the Wolf 630 group of co-moving stars.

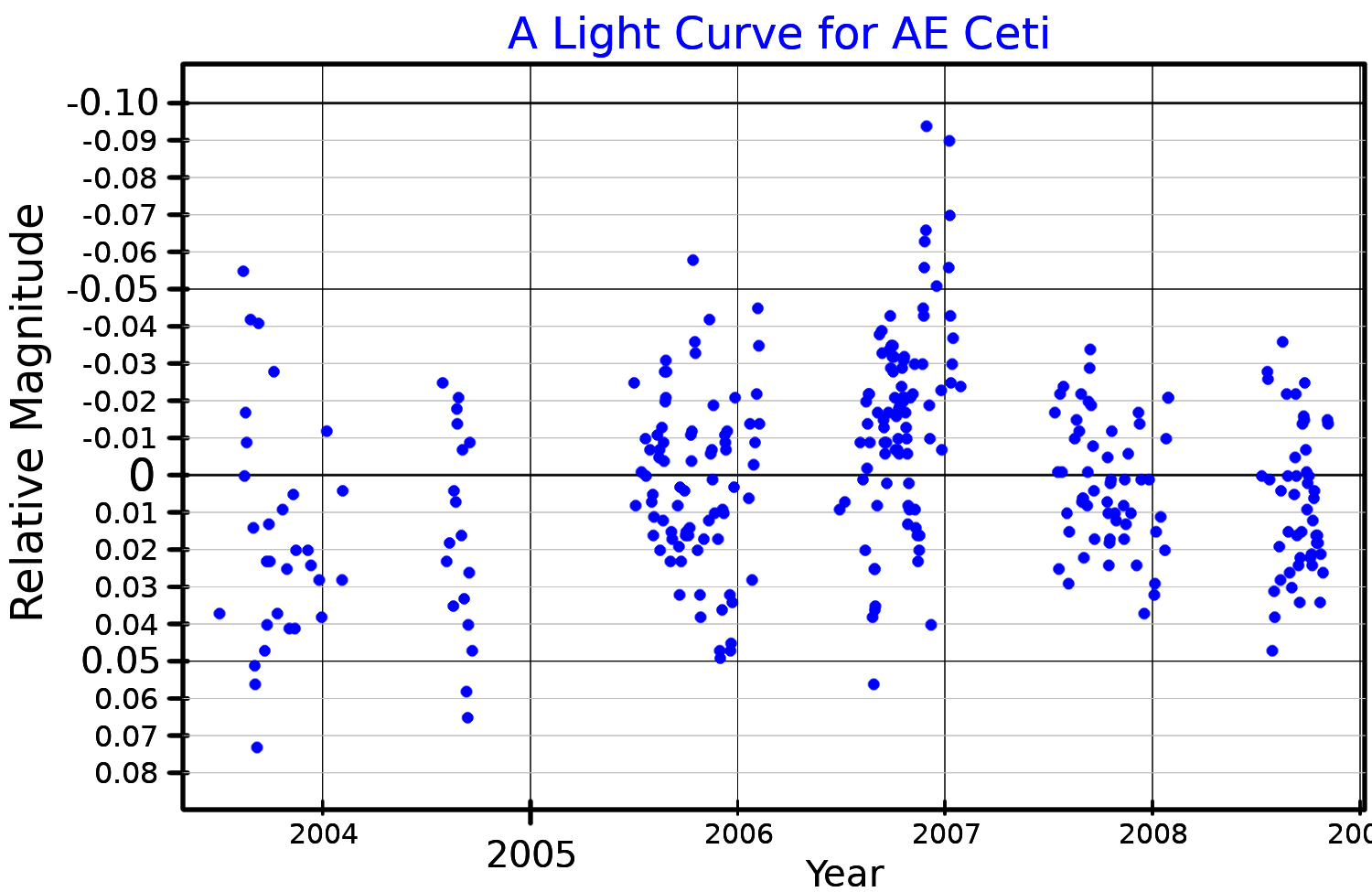
A light curve for AE Ceti, plotted from data presented by Tabur, et al. (2009)

This is an aging red giant star with a stellar classification of M1 III, currently on the asymptotic giant branch. In 1959, Alan William James Cousins announced the detection of variability in the brightness of 7 Ceti. It was given its variable star designation in 1973. Samus et al. (2017) has it classed as a slow irregular variable of type LB:, and ranges in magnitude from 4.26 down to 4.46. Tabur et al. (2009) list it as a semiregular variable with four known periods ranging in frequency from 19.2 to 41.7 days. The stellar atmosphere of 7 Ceti has expanded to an estimated 69 times the Sun's radius. It is radiating around 1,011 times the Sun's luminosity from its enlarged photosphere at an effective temperature of 3,909 K.

Luminosity variation
Period (Days)	Amplitude (Mag.)
19.2	0.018
19.6	0.020
27.1	0.018
41.7	0.017
