= Tau Ceti =

Single yellow-hued star in the constellation Cetus

- Location of τ Ceti (circled)

Observation data Epoch J2000 Equinox ICRS
- Constellation: Cetus
- Pronunciation: /ˌtaʊ ˈsiːtaɪ/
- Right ascension: 01^{h} 44^{m} 04.083^{s}
- Declination: −15° 56′ 14.93″
- Apparent magnitude (V): 3.50±0.01

Characteristics
- Evolutionary stage: Main sequence
- Spectral type: G8V
- U−B color index: +0.21
- B−V color index: +0.72

Astrometry
| Radial velocity (R_{v}) | −16.68±0.05 km/s |
| Proper motion (μ) | RA: −1721.728 mas/yr Dec.: +854.963 mas/yr |
| Parallax (π) | 273.8097±0.1701 mas |
| Distance | 11.912 ± 0.007 ly (3.652 ± 0.002 pc) |
| Absolute magnitude (M_{V}) | 5.69±0.01 |
| Absolute bolometric magnitude (M_{bol}) | 5.52±0.02 |

Details
| Mass | 0.800±0.008 M_{☉} |
| Radius | 0.801±0.008 R_{☉} |
| Luminosity | 0.48±0.02 L_{☉} |
| Luminosity (visual, L_{V}) | 0.45 (Note: From knowing the absolute visual magnitude of Tau Ceti, $M_{V_\ast} = 5.69$, and the absolute visual magnitude of the Sun, $M_{V_\odot} = 4.83$, the visual luminosity of Tau Ceti can therefore be calculated: $L_{V_\ast}/L_{V_\odot} = 10^{0.4 (M_{V_\odot} - M_{V_\ast})}$.) L_{☉} |
| Surface gravity (log g) | 4.38±0.03 cgs |
| Temperature | 5,382±52 K |
| Metallicity | 28±3% Sun |
| Metallicity [Fe/H] | −0.55±0.05 dex |
| Rotation | 46±4 d |
| Rotational velocity (v sin i) | 0.1±0.1 km/s |
| Age | 8–10 Gyr |

Other designations
- τ Cet, 52 Cet, BD−16°295, FK5 59, GJ 71, HD 10700, HIP 8102, HR 509, SAO 147986, LFT 159, LHS 146, LTT 935

Database references
| SIMBAD | data |
| Exoplanet Archive | data |
| ARICNS | data |

Tau Ceti is a single star in the constellation Cetus. Its name is a Bayer designation. Spectrally, this star is similar to the Sun, although it has only about 78% of the Sun's mass. At a distance of just under 12 light-years (3.7 parsecs) from the Solar System, it is a relatively nearby star and the closest solitary G-type star. The star appears stable, with little stellar variation, and is metal-deficient (low in elements other than hydrogen and helium) relative to the Sun.

It can be seen with the unaided eye with an apparent magnitude of 3.5. As seen from Tau Ceti, the Sun would be in the northern hemisphere constellation Boötes with an apparent magnitude of about 2.6. (Note: From Tau Ceti the Sun would appear on the diametrically opposite side of the sky at the coordinates RA = 13^{h} 44^{m} 04^{s}, Dec = 15° 56′ 14″, which is located near Tau Boötis. The absolute magnitude of the Sun is 4.8, so, at a distance of 3.65 pc, the Sun would have an apparent magnitude $m = M_v + 5 \cdot (\log_{10} 3.64 - 1) = 2.6$.)

Observations have detected more than ten times as much dust surrounding Tau Ceti as is present in the Solar System. Tau Ceti has been an object of interest for exoplanet searches, and a number of candidate planets have been proposed, but as of 2025 there remains no unambiguous evidence of planets. Because of its debris disk, any planet orbiting Tau Ceti would face far more impact events than present day Earth. Despite this hurdle to habitability, its solar analog (Sun-like) characteristics have led to widespread interest in the star. Given its stability, similarity and relative proximity to the Sun, Tau Ceti is consistently listed as a target for the search for extraterrestrial intelligence (SETI).

== Name ==
The name "Tau Ceti" is the Bayer designation for this star, established in 1603 as part of German celestial cartographer Johann Bayer's Uranometria star catalogue: it is "number T" in Bayer's sequence of constellation Cetus. τ is the Greek letter tau (ταῦ), while Ceti is the Latin genitive form of Cetus. The designation τ Ceti is therefore Latinized as Tau Ceti and abbreviated Tau Cet or τ Cet.

In the catalogue of stars in the Calendarium of Al Achsasi al Mouakket, written at Cairo about 1650, this star was designated Thālith al Naʽāmāt (ثالث النعامات – thālith al-naʽāmāt), which was translated into Latin as Tertia Struthionum, meaning the third of the ostriches. This star, along with η Cet (Gajahmina), θ Cet (Tiancang), ζ Cet (Baten Kaitos), and υ Cet, were Al Naʽāmāt (النعامات), the Hen Ostriches.

In Chinese astronomy, the "Square Celestial Granary" (Chinese: 天倉; pinyin: Tiān Cāng) refers to an asterism consisting of τ Ceti, ι Ceti, η Ceti, ζ Ceti, θ Ceti and 57 Ceti. Consequently, the Chinese name for τ Ceti itself is "the Fifth Star of Square Celestial Granary" (Chinese: 天倉五; pinyin: Tiān Cāng wǔ).

== Motion ==
The proper motion of a star is its angular rate of movement across the celestial sphere, determined by comparing its position relative to more distant background objects. Moving at 1.9 arcseconds per year (1900 years per degree), (Note: The net proper motion is given by $\mu = \sqrt{\mu_\delta^2 + \mu_\alpha^2 \cdot \cos^2 \delta} = 1907.79~\text{mas/y}$, where μ_{α} and μ_{δ} are the components of proper motion in the RA and declination respectively, and δ is the declination. See: Majewski, Steven R. (2006). "Stellar Motions". University of Virginia.) Tau Ceti is considered to be a high-proper-motion star. A high proper motion is an indication of closeness to the Sun: nearby stars can traverse an angle of arc across the sky more rapidly than the distant background stars and are thus good candidates for parallax studies. In the case of Tau Ceti, the parallax measurements indicate a distance of 11.9 ly. This makes it one of the closest star systems to the Sun and the next-closest spectral class-G star after Alpha Centauri A.

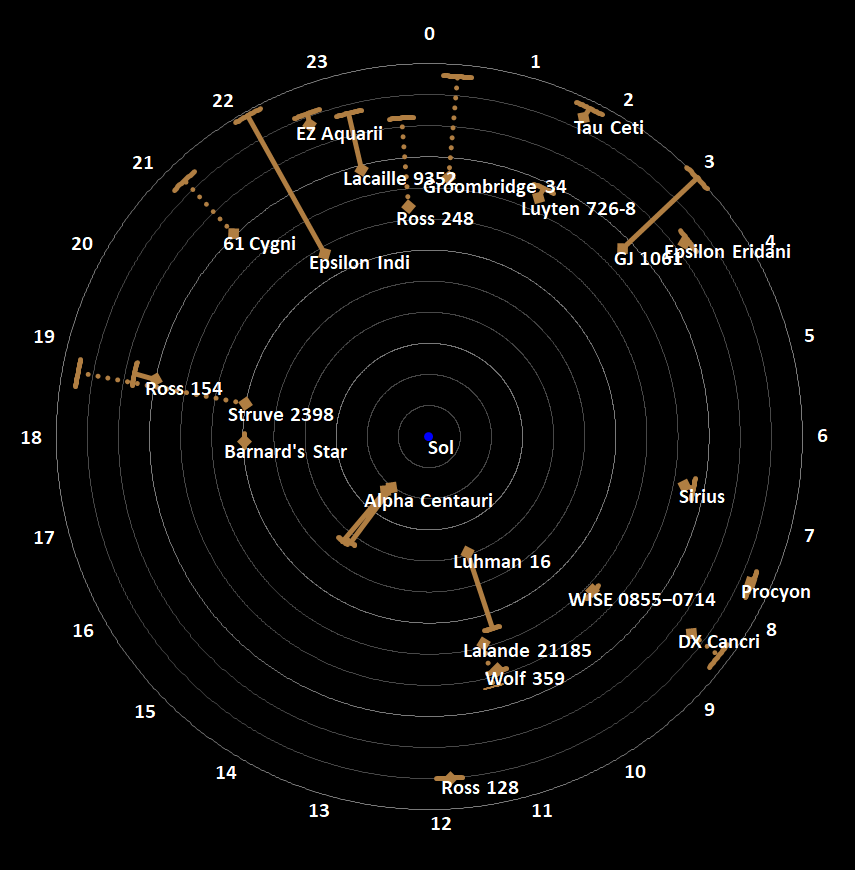
Radar distance and position map of the nearest star systems, stars or brown dwarfs within 12 light-years from Earth, with Tau Ceti marked at the edge of the map.

The radial velocity of a star is the component of its motion that is toward or away from the Sun. It can be determined by measuring the star's spectrum: due to the Doppler shift, the absorption lines in the spectrum of a star will be shifted slightly toward the red (or longer wavelengths) if the star is moving away from the observer, or toward blue (or shorter wavelengths) when it moves toward the observer. In the case of Tau Ceti, the radial velocity is about −17 km/s, with the negative value indicating that it is moving toward the Sun. The star will make its closest approach to the Sun in about 43,000 years, when it comes to within 10.6 ly (3.25 pc).

The distance to Tau Ceti, along with its proper motion and radial velocity, together give the motion of the star through space. The space velocity relative to the Sun is 37.2 km/s. This result can then be used to compute an orbital path of Tau Ceti through the Milky Way. It has a mean galacto-centric distance of 9.7 kiloparsecs (32000 ly) and an orbital eccentricity of 0.22.

== Physical properties ==
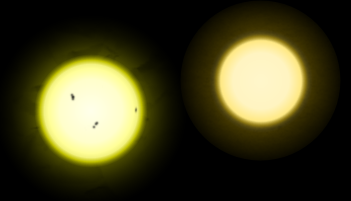
The Sun (left) is both larger and somewhat hotter than the less active Tau Ceti (right).

The Tau Ceti system is believed to have only one stellar component. A dim optical companion has been observed with magnitude 13.1. As of 2000, it was 137 arcseconds distant from the primary. It may be gravitationally bound, but it is considered more likely to be a line-of-sight coincidence.

Most of what is known about the physical properties of Tau Ceti and its system has been determined through spectroscopic measurements. By comparing the spectrum to computed models of stellar evolution, the age, mass, radius and luminosity of Tau Ceti can be estimated. However, using an astronomical interferometer, measurements of the radius of the star can be made directly to an accuracy of 0.5%. Through such means, the radius of Tau Ceti has been measured to be 80.1%±0.8% of the solar radius. This is about the size that is expected for a star with somewhat lower mass than the Sun.

=== Rotation ===
The rotation period for Tau Ceti was measured by periodic variations in the classic H and K absorption lines of singly ionized calcium (Ca II). These lines are closely associated with surface magnetic activity, so the period of variation measures the time required for the activity sites to complete a full rotation about the star. By this means the rotation period for Tau Ceti is estimated to be 34 d. Due to the Doppler effect, the rotation rate of a star affects the width of the absorption lines in the spectrum (light from the side of the star moving away from the observer will be shifted to a longer wavelength; light from the side moving towards the observer will be shifted toward a shorter wavelength). By analyzing the width of these lines, the rotational velocity of a star can be estimated. The projected rotation velocity for Tau Ceti is

v_{eq} · sin i ≈ 1 km/s,

where v_{eq} is the velocity at the equator, and i is the inclination angle of the rotation axis to the line of sight. For a typical G8 star, the rotation velocity is about 2.5 km/s. The relatively low rotational velocity measurements may indicate that Tau Ceti is being viewed from nearly the direction of its pole.

More recently, a 2023 study has estimated a rotation period of 46±4 d and a v_{eq} sin i of 0.1±0.1 km/s, corresponding to a pole-on inclination of 7°±7°.

=== Metallicity ===
The chemical composition of a star provides important clues to its evolutionary history, including the age at which it formed. The interstellar medium of dust and gas from which stars form is primarily composed of hydrogen and helium with trace amounts of heavier elements. As nearby stars continually evolve and die, they seed the interstellar medium with an increasing portion of heavier elements. Thus younger stars tend to have a higher portion of heavy elements in their atmospheres than do the older stars. These heavy elements are termed "metals" by astronomers, and the portion of heavy elements is the metallicity. The amount of metallicity in a star is given in terms of the ratio of iron (Fe), an easily observed heavy element, to hydrogen. A logarithm of the relative iron abundance is compared to the Sun. In the case of Tau Ceti, the atmospheric metallicity is

$\left[\frac{\text{Fe}}{\text{H}}\right] \approx -0.50$ dex,

equivalent to about a third the solar abundance. Past measurements have varied from −0.13 to −0.60.

This lower abundance of iron indicates that Tau Ceti is almost certainly older than the Sun. Its age had previously been estimated to be 5.8 Gyr, but is now thought to be around 9 Gyr. This compares with 4.57 Gyr for the Sun. However, age estimates for Tau Ceti can range from 4.4 to 12 Gyr, depending on the model adopted.

Besides rotation, another factor that can widen the absorption features in the spectrum of a star is pressure broadening. The presence of nearby particles affects the radiation emitted by an individual particle. So the line width is dependent on the surface pressure of the star, which in turn is determined by the temperature and surface gravity. This technique was used to determine the surface gravity of Tau Ceti. The log g, or logarithm of the star's surface gravity, is about 4.38, very close to the log g = 4.44 for the Sun.

=== Luminosity and variability ===
The luminosity of Tau Ceti is equal to only 55% of the Sun's luminosity. A terrestrial planet would need to orbit this star at a distance of about 0.7 AU to match the solar insolation level of Earth, where an AU is the distance of the Earth from the Sun. This is approximately the same as the average distance between Venus and the Sun.

The chromosphere of Tau Ceti—the portion of a star's atmosphere just above the light-emitting photosphere—currently displays little or no magnetic activity, indicating a stable star. One 9-year study of temperature, granulation, and the chromosphere showed no systematic variations; Ca II emissions around the H and K infrared bands show a possible 11-year cycle, but this is weak relative to the Sun. Alternatively it has been suggested that the star could be in a low-activity state analogous to a Maunder Minimum—a historical period, associated with the Little Ice Age in Europe, when sunspots became exceedingly rare on the Sun's surface. Spectral line profiles of Tau Ceti are extremely narrow, indicating low turbulence and observed rotation. The star's asteroseismological oscillations have an amplitude about half that of the Sun and a lower mode lifetime.

== Search for planets ==
The principal factors driving research interest in Tau Ceti are its proximity, its Sun-like characteristics, and the implications for possible life on its planets. For categorization purposes, Hall and Lockwood report that "the terms 'solarlike star', 'solar analog', and 'solar twin' [are] progressively restrictive descriptions".

In 1988, radial-velocity observations ruled out any periodical variations attributable to massive planets around Tau Ceti inside of Jupiter-like distances. Ever more precise measurements continue to rule out such planets, at least until December 2012. The velocity precision reached is about 11 m/s measured over a 5-year time span. This result excludes hot Jupiters and probably excludes any planets with minimal mass greater than or equal to Jupiter's mass and with orbital periods less than 15 years. In addition, a survey of nearby stars by the Hubble Space Telescope's Wide Field and Planetary Camera was completed in 1999, including a search for faint companions to Tau Ceti; none were discovered to limits of the telescope's resolving power.

However, these searches only excluded larger brown dwarf bodies and closer orbiting giant planets, so smaller, Earth-like planets in orbit around the star were not precluded. If hot Jupiters were to exist in close orbit, they would likely disrupt the star's habitable zone; their exclusion was thus considered positive for the possibility of Earth-like planets. General research has shown a positive correlation between the presence of planets and a relatively high-metallicity parent star, suggesting that stars with lower metallicity such as Tau Ceti have a lower chance of having planets.

The Tau Ceti planetary system
| Companion (in order from star) | Mass | Semimajor axis (AU) | Orbital period (days) | Eccentricity | Inclination (°) | Radius |
|---|---|---|---|---|---|---|
| g (unconfirmed) | ≥1.75+0.25 −0.40 M_{🜨} | 0.133+0.001 −0.002 | 20.00+0.02 −0.01 | 0.06 ± 0.13 | — | — |
| h (unconfirmed) | ≥1.83+0.68 −0.26 M_{🜨} | 0.243 ± 0.003 | 49.41+0.08 −0.10 | 0.23+0.16 −0.15 | — | — |
| f (unconfirmed) | ≥3.93+1.05 −1.37 M_{🜨} | 1.334+0.017 −0.044 | 636.13+11.70 −47.69 | 0.16+0.07 −0.16 | — | — |
| Debris disk | 6.2+9.8 −4.6–52+3 −8 AU | | | | 35±10° | — |

=== Planet candidates ===
On December 19, 2012, evidence was presented that suggested a system of five candidate planets orbiting Tau Ceti. The planets' estimated minimum masses were between 2 and 6 Earth masses, with orbital periods ranging from 14 to 640 days. One of them, Tau Ceti e, appeared to orbit about half as far from Tau Ceti as Earth does from the Sun. With Tau Ceti's luminosity of 52% that of the Sun and a distance from the star of 0.552 AU, the planet would receive 1.71 times as much stellar radiation as Earth does, slightly less than Venus with 1.91 times Earth's. Nevertheless, some research placed it within the star's habitable zone. The Planetary Habitability Laboratory estimated that Tau Ceti f, which receives 28.5% as much starlight as Earth, would be within the star's habitable zone, albeit narrowly.

New results were published in August 2017. They confirmed Tau Ceti e and f as candidates but failed to consistently detect planets b (which may be a false negative), c (whose weakly defined apparent signal was correlated to stellar rotation), and d (which did not show up in all data sets). Instead, they found two new planetary candidates, g and h, with orbits of 20 and 49 days. The signals detected from the candidate planets have radial velocities as low as 30 cm/s, and the experimental method used in their detection, as it was applied to HARPS, could in theory have detected down to around 20 cm/s. The updated 4-planet model is dynamically packed and potentially stable for billions of years.

In 2019, a paper published in Astronomy & Astrophysics suggested that Tau Ceti could have a Jupiter or super-Jupiter based on a tangential astrometric velocity of around 11.3 m/s. The exact size and position of this conjectured object have not been determined, though it is at most 5 Jupiter masses if it orbits between 3 and 20 AU. (Note: If a planet is confirmed to be the cause of this signal, as of August 2020 it would be designated as Tau Ceti i in accordance with IAU exoplanet naming policies.) A 2020 Astronomical Journal study by astronomers Jamie Dietrich and Daniel Apai analyzed the orbital stability of the known planets, assuming the 2017 4-planet model, and, considering statistical patterns identified from hundreds of other planetary systems, explored the orbits in which the presence of additional, yet-undetected planets are most likely. This analysis predicted three additional planets at orbits coinciding with planet candidates b, c, and d. The close match between the independently predicted planet periods and the periods of the three planet candidates previously identified in radial velocity data could support the genuine planetary nature of these candidates, although they were rejected by the 2017 paper. Furthermore, the study also predicted at least one yet-undetected planet between planets e and f, i.e., within the habitable zone. This predicted exoplanet was identified as PxP-4.

All proposed planet candidates remain unconfirmed; studies of Tau Ceti's radial velocity in 2019, 2021 and 2025 were unable to confirm any planets. In particular, a 2025 study using ESPRESSO data did not detect any planets, while being sensitive to 1.7 M_{🜨} planets with periods up to 100 days, and 2–5 M_{🜨} planets in the habitable zone. These results do not support the existence of Tau Ceti e, while planets g & h are close to the detection limit and planet f is below it. (Note: Based on their original published masses, these results also rule out the existence of planets b, c & d, which were already rejected in 2017.) While weak evidence was found for a 20-day signal (corresponding to Tau Ceti g), it is not statistically significant and its planetary nature is considered doubtful.

Since Tau Ceti is likely aligned in such a way that it is nearly pole-on to Earth (as indicated by its rotation), if its planets share this alignment and have nearly face-on orbits, they would be less similar to Earth's mass and more to Neptune, Saturn, or Jupiter. For example, were Tau Ceti f's orbit inclined 70 degrees from being face-on to Earth, its mass would be 4.18+1.12
−1.46 Earth masses, making it a middle-to-low end super-Earth. However, these scenarios are not necessarily true; since Tau Ceti's debris disk has an inclination of 35±10, the planets' orbits could be similarly inclined. If the debris disk and f's orbits were assumed to be equal, f would be between 5.56+1.48
−1.94 and 9.30+2.48
−3.24 Earth masses, making it slightly more likely to be a mini-Neptune. On top of that, the lower the inclination of the planetary orbits the less stable they tend to be over a given time period, as the planets would have greater masses and therefore more gravitational pull which would in turn disturb the orbital stability of neighbouring planets. So, for example, if as estimated in Korolik et al 2023 Tau Ceti has a pole-on inclination of around 7 degrees, and the postulated planets do as well, then those planets' orbits would be verging on instability within just a 10 million year timeframe, and therefore it is extremely unlikely they would have survived for the billions of years that make up the lifetime of the star system.

=== Tau Ceti e ===
Tau Ceti e is a doubtful candidate planet orbiting Tau Ceti that was first proposed in 2012 by statistical analyses of the data of the star's variations in radial velocity that were obtained using HIRES, AAPS, and HARPS. Its possible properties were refined in 2017: if it existed, it would orbit at a distance of 0.552 AU (between the orbits of Venus and Mercury in the Solar System) with an orbital period of 168 days and has a minimum mass of 3.93 Earth masses. If Tau Ceti e possessed an Earth-like atmosphere, the surface temperature would be around 68 °C (154 °F). Based upon the incident flux upon the planet, a study by Güdel et al. (2014) speculated that the planet may lie outside the habitable zone and be closer to a Venus-like world. The planet candidate has been challenged by subsequent non-detections; in particular, a 2025 study failed to detect Tau Ceti e with the ESPRESSO spectrograph, despite being sensitive to it. This has effectively ruled out the existence of the planet, leading the NASA Exoplanet Archive to demote it to false positive status in April 2026.

=== Tau Ceti f ===
Tau Ceti f is a candidate planet orbiting Tau Ceti that was proposed in 2012 by statistical analyses of the star's variations in radial velocity, and also recovered by further analysis in 2017. It is of interest because its orbit places it in Tau Ceti's extended habitable zone. However, a 2015 study implies that it would have been in the temperate zone for less than one billion years, so there may not be a detectable biosignature.

Few properties of the planet are known other than its orbit and mass. It orbits Tau Ceti at a distance of 1.35 AU (near Mars's orbit in the Solar System) with an orbital period of 642 days and has a minimum mass of 3.93 Earth masses.

However, a reanalysis of the data in 2021 provided an in-depth study of the HARPS spectrograph systematics, showing that the 600-day signal was likely a spurious combination of instrumental systematics with a potential 1000-day yet unknown signal.

=== Debris disk ===
In 2004, a team of UK astronomers led by Jane Greaves discovered that Tau Ceti has more than ten times the amount of cometary and asteroidal material orbiting it than does the Sun. This was determined by measuring the disk of cold dust orbiting the star produced by collisions between such small bodies. This result puts a damper on the possibility of complex life in the system, because any planets would suffer from large impact events roughly ten times more frequently than present day Earth. Greaves noted at the time of her research that "it is likely that [any planets] will experience constant bombardment from asteroids of the kind believed to have wiped out the dinosaurs". Such bombardments would inhibit the development of biodiversity between impacts.

The debris disk was discovered by measuring the amount of radiation emitted by the system in the far infrared portion of the spectrum. The disk forms a symmetric feature that is centered on the star, and its outer radius averages 55 AU. The lack of infrared radiation from the warmer parts of the disk near Tau Ceti implies an inner cut-off at a radius of 10 AU. By comparison, the Solar System's Kuiper belt extends from 30 to 50 AU. To be maintained over a long period of time, this ring of dust must be constantly replenished through collisions by larger bodies. The bulk of the disk appears to be orbiting Tau Ceti at a distance of 35–50 AU, well outside the orbit of the habitable zone. At this distance, the dust belt may be analogous to the Kuiper belt that lies outside the orbit of Neptune in the Solar System.

Tau Ceti shows that stars need not lose large disks as they age, and such a thick belt may not be uncommon among Sun-like stars. Tau Ceti's belt is only 1/20 as dense as the belt around its young neighbor, Epsilon Eridani. The relative lack of debris around the Sun may be the unusual case: one research-team member suggests the Sun may have passed close to another star early in its history and had most of its comets and asteroids stripped away. Stars with large debris disks have changed the way astronomers think about planet formation because debris disk stars, where dust is continually generated by collisions, appear to form planets readily.

=== Habitability ===
Tau Ceti's habitable zone—the locations where liquid water could be present on an Earth-sized planet—spans a radius of 0.55–1.16 AU. Primitive life on Tau Ceti's planet candidates may reveal itself through an analysis of atmospheric composition via spectroscopy, if the composition is unlikely to be abiotic, just as oxygen on Earth is indicative of life.

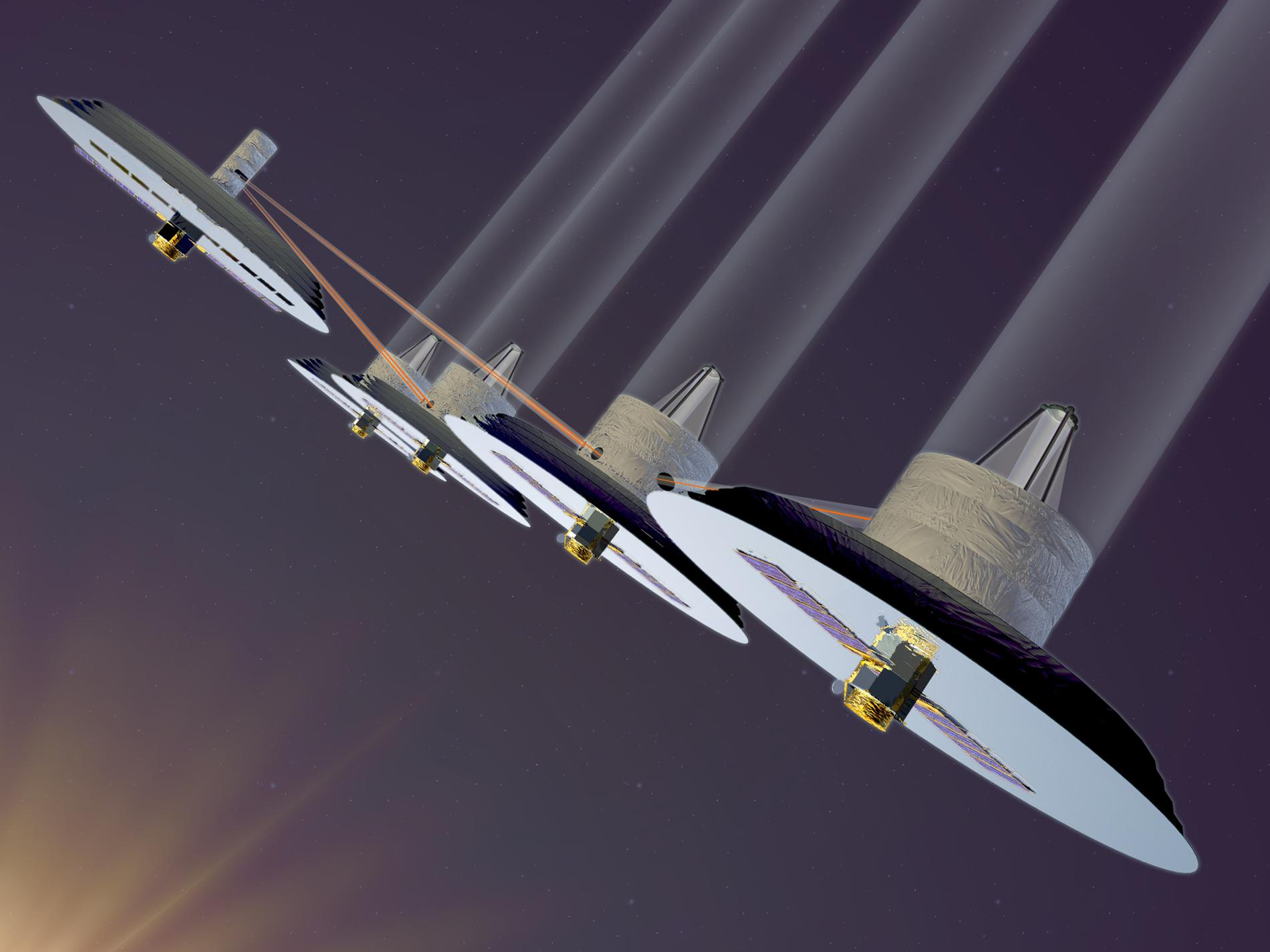
Tau Ceti could have been a search target for the canceled Terrestrial Planet Finder

The most optimistic search project to date was Project Ozma, which was intended to "search for extraterrestrial intelligence" (SETI) by examining selected stars for indications of artificial radio signals. It was run by the astronomer Frank Drake, who selected Tau Ceti and Epsilon Eridani as the initial targets. Both are located near the Solar System and are physically similar to the Sun. No artificial signals were found despite 200 hours of observations. Subsequent radio searches of this star system have turned up negative.

This lack of results has not dampened interest in observing the Tau Ceti system for biosignatures. In 2002, astronomers Margaret Turnbull and Jill Tarter developed the Catalog of Nearby Habitable Systems (HabCat) under the auspices of Project Phoenix, another SETI endeavour. The list contained more than 17000 theoretically habitable systems, approximately 10% of the original sample. The next year, Turnbull would further refine the list to the 30 most promising systems out of 5000 within 100 light-years from the Sun, including Tau Ceti; this will form part of the basis of radio searches with the Allen Telescope Array. She chose Tau Ceti for a final shortlist of just five stars suitable for searches by the (now cancelled) Terrestrial Planet Finder telescope system, commenting that "these are places I'd want to live if God were to put our planet around another star".

== In fiction ==
The Tau Ceti system is a common setting in science fiction. James Nicoll, writing for Tor.com, attributes this to a confluence of factors that make it the nearest star (at a distance of approximately 12 light-years) that could plausibly harbour habitable planets, including having a favourable brightness and being a solitary rather than multiple star. In 2015, Andrew Liptak interviewed several authors about why they used Tau Ceti for their stories; in addition to the star's relative proximity to Earth, Ursula K. Le Guin (who wrote The Dispossessed, 1974) and Larry Niven (The Legacy of Heorot, 1987, with Jerry Pournelle and Steven Barnes) cited the star's similarity to the Sun, while Kim Stanley Robinson (Aurora, 2015) pointed to the recent discovery of several exoplanets around Tau Ceti.

Tau Ceti appears as a setting in Andy Weir's 2021 novel Project Hail Mary and its 2026 film adaptation, which features the postulated planet Tau Ceti e, given the name "Adrian". Similarly, the 2026 video game Directive 8020, The Dark Pictures anthology's fifth entry, focuses on another hypothetical planet, Tau Ceti f.

== See also ==
- List of potentially habitable exoplanets
- List of nearest terrestrial exoplanet candidates
- List of nearest G-type stars
