= Iota Ceti =

Star in the constellation Cetus

- Location of ι Ceti (circled in red)

Observation data Epoch J2000.0 Equinox J2000.0 (ICRS)
- Constellation: Cetus
- Right ascension: 00^{h} 19^{m} 25.67439^{s}
- Declination: −08° 49′ 26.1090″
- Apparent magnitude (V): 3.562

Characteristics
- Spectral type: K1.5 III or K1 II + (K)
- U−B color index: +1.278
- B−V color index: +1.212
- Variable type: Suspected

Astrometry
Radial velocity (R_{v})	+19.35±0.17 km/s
Proper motion (μ)	RA: −14.61 mas/yr Dec.: −36.668° mas/yr
Parallax (π)	11.6996±0.1968 mas
Distance	279 ± 5 ly (85 ± 1 pc)
Absolute magnitude (M_{V})	−1.2

Details
Mass	3.7±0.1 M_{☉}
Radius	30±0.7 R_{☉}
Luminosity	377±22 L_{☉}
Surface gravity (log g)	2.1 cgs
Temperature	4,645±73 K
Metallicity [Fe/H]	−0.09 dex
Rotational velocity (v sin i)	0.4 km/s
Age	230±30 Myr

Other designations
- ι Cet, 8 Cet, BD−09°48, FK5 9, HD 1522, HIP 1562, HR 74, SAO 128694

Database references
SIMBAD	data

Iota Ceti is a star system in the equatorial constellation of Cetus. Its name is a Bayer designation that is Latinized from ι Ceti, and abbreviated Iota Cet or ι Cet. It has the traditional name Deneb Kaitos Shemali. The name was from the Arabic word ذنب قيطس الشمالي - dhanab qayṭas al-shamālī, meaning the northern tail of the sea monster. it is visible to the naked eye with an apparent visual magnitude of 3.562. Based upon an annual parallax shift of 11.7 mas, it lies around 279 light-years (85 pc) from the Sun. The system is drifting further away with a line of sight velocity component of +19 km/s.

In Chinese, 天倉 (Tiān Cāng), meaning Square Celestial Granary, refers to an asterism consisting of ι Ceti, η Ceti, θ Ceti, ζ Ceti, τ Ceti and 57 Ceti. Consequently, the Chinese name for ι Ceti itself is 天倉一 (Tiān Cāng yī, English: the First Star of Square Celestial Granary.)

This is an MK-standard star with a stellar classification of K1.5 III, indicating that it is an evolved K-type giant star. However, Houk and Swift (1999) list a classification of K1 II, which would indicate this is a bright giant. It is a suspected variable with a visual amplitude of around 0.05 magnitude. The star has about 3.7 times the mass of the Sun, 30 times the Sun's radius, and radiates 380 times the solar luminosity from its outer atmosphere at an effective temperature of 4,645 K.

Iota Ceti forms a wide astrometric pair with a common proper motion companion, a magnitude 10.40 star at an angular separation of 106.4 arcseconds along a position angle of 191° (as of 2014). This companion may be a K-type star.
