= 3 Ceti =

Star in the constellation Cetus

Observation data Epoch J2000 Equinox ICRS
- Constellation: Cetus
- Right ascension: 00^{h} 04^{m} 30.11827^{s}
- Declination: −10° 30′ 34.2849″
- Apparent magnitude (V): 4.953

Characteristics
- Spectral type: K3 III or K3 Ib
- B−V color index: +1.66

Astrometry
Radial velocity (R_{v})	−42.10±0.33 km/s
Proper motion (μ)	RA: −6.85 mas/yr Dec.: −12.02 mas/yr
Parallax (π)	1.56±0.31 mas
Distance	approx. 2,100 ly (approx. 600 pc)

Details
Mass	9.0±0.6 M_{☉}
Radius	182 R_{☉}
Luminosity (bolometric)	7,877 L_{☉}
Surface gravity (log g)	0.90 cgs
Temperature	4,152 K
Metallicity [Fe/H]	0.08 dex
Rotational velocity (v sin i)	5.8±1.0 km/s
Age	29.7±3.6 Myr

Other designations
- 3 Cet, NSV 13, BD−11°6194, FK5 2001, HD 225212, HIP 355, HR 9103, SAO 147066, 2MASS J00043012-1030344

Database references
SIMBAD	data

3 Ceti is a single, orange-hued star located around 2,100 light years away in the equatorial constellation of Cetus. It is visible to the naked eye with an apparent visual magnitude of 4.95. The star is moving closer to the Earth with a heliocentric radial velocity of −42 km/s. It has a peculiar velocity of 60.7+3.8
−6.2 km/s and is a candidate runaway star.

This is a red supergiant star with a stellar classification of K3 Ib, although Houk and Swift (1999) classed it as a normal giant at K3 III. It displays microvariability, undergoing changes in brightness with a frequency of 11.2 times per day and an amplitude of 0.0053 in magnitude. The star is about 30 million years old with nine times the mass of the Sun and 182 times the radius of the Sun. It is radiating 7,877 times the Sun's luminosity from its photosphere at an effective temperature of 4,152 K.

It is a possible supernova candidate.
