= 13 Ceti =

Star in the constellation Cetus

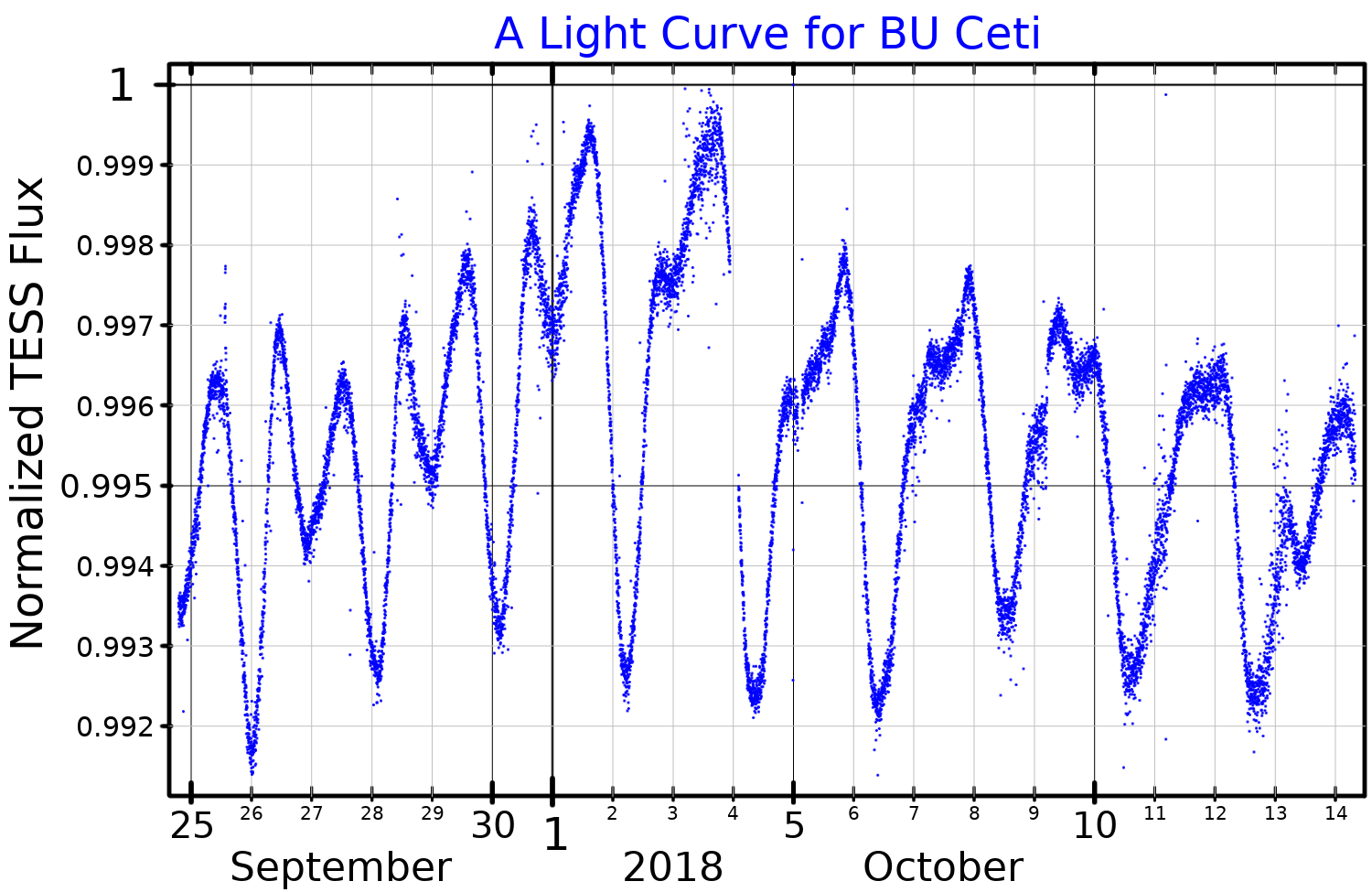
- A light curve for BU Ceti, plotted from TESS data

Observation data Epoch J2000.0 Equinox ICRS
- Constellation: Cetus
- Right ascension: 00^{h} 35^{m} 14.87968^{s}
- Declination: −03° 35′ 34.2367″
- Apparent magnitude (V): 5.20 (5.61 + 6.90)

Characteristics
- B−V color index: 0.567±0.008

A
- Evolutionary stage: Main sequence + main sequence
- Spectral type: F6 V + K3.5 V
- Variable type: RS CVn

B
- Evolutionary stage: Main sequence
- Spectral type: G4 V

Astrometry
Radial velocity (R_{v})	+10.37±0.40 km/s
Proper motion (μ)	RA: +408.34 mas/yr Dec.: −35.22 mas/yr
Parallax (π)	47.05±0.67 mas
Distance	69.3 ± 1.0 ly (21.3 ± 0.3 pc)
Absolute magnitude (M_{V})	3.56

Orbit
Primary	A
Name	B
Period (P)	6.8975+0.0005 −0.0006 yr
Semi-major axis (a)	234.07+0.74 −0.73 mas
Eccentricity (e)	0.7615+0.0013 −0.0014
Inclination (i)	47.83±0.24°
Longitude of the node (Ω)	328.39±0.22°
Periastron epoch (T)	1890.6139+0.0091 −0.0085
Argument of periastron (ω) (secondary)	104.70±0.18°
Semi-amplitude (K_{1}) (primary)	11.68±0.51 km/s
Semi-amplitude (K_{2}) (secondary)	15.59±0.17 km/s

Orbit
Primary	Aa
Name	Ab
Period (P)	2.081891±0.000005 d
Semi-major axis (a)	≥1.260±0.010 Mm
Eccentricity (e)	0.0 (fixed)
Periastron epoch (T)	2,443,400.4573±0.0032 HJD
Argument of periastron (ω) (secondary)	0.0°
Semi-amplitude (K_{1}) (primary)	43.98±0.39 km/s

Details

Aa
Mass	1.18±0.09 M_{☉}
Luminosity	2.63 L_{☉}
Temperature	6,457 K
Age	3.8+1.8 −0.3 Gyr

Ab
Mass	0.35 M_{☉}

B
Mass	0.90±0.09 M_{☉}
Luminosity	0.83 L_{☉}
Temperature	5,754 K
Age	2.5 Gyr

Other designations
- HO 212, 13 Cet, BU Cet, BD−04°62, GC 696, GJ 23, HD 3196, HIP 2762, HR 142, SAO 128839, WDS 00352-0336

Database references
SIMBAD	data

13 Ceti is a triple star system in the equatorial constellation of Cetus. It is dimly visible to the naked eye with a combined apparent visual magnitude of 5.20. The system is located at a distance of approximately 69 light years from the Sun based on stellar parallax, and is drifting further away with a radial velocity of +10.4 km/s. It shares a common motion with the Hyades moving group, although it is too old to be a member.

Aa, F6V
2.1 days
Ab, K3.5V
6.9 years
B, G4V

Hierarchy of orbits in the 13 Ceti system

This star was identified as a visual binary system by G. W. Hough in 1844 and given the identifier HO 212. The pair have an orbital period of 6.9 years and an eccentricity of 0.76. The brighter member, designated component A, is an F-type main-sequence star with a stellar classification of F6 V and a visual magnitude of 5.61. It appears to have an active chromosphere and is classified as an RS Canum Venaticorum variable with a variable star designation of BU Cet. The star was detected as a source of soft X-ray emission by EXOSAT. It has 18% more mass than the Sun and is estimated to be about four billion years old.

In 1907, E. B. Frost discovered the primary is a spectroscopic binary, making this a triple star system. This is a double-lined spectroscopic binary with a period of 2.1 days and a circularized orbit. The companion signature was confirmed using the separated fringe packet technique with the CHARA array. It is most likely a K-type main-sequence star with a class of K3.5 V and 70% of the mass of the Sun.

The secondary member of the visual binary, designated component B, is a G-type main-sequence star with a class of G4 V. It has 90% of the Sun's mass and a visual magnitude of 6.90. A distant visual companion to this system was detected by S. W. Burnham in 1877. Designated component C, this star is a background object of magnitude 12.50. As of 1999, it was located at an angular separation of 24.0″ from the primary along a position angle of 322°.
