= 56 Ceti =

K-type star in the constellation Cetus

- Location of 56 Ceti (circled in red)

Observation data Epoch J2000 Equinox ICRS
- Constellation: Cetus
- Right ascension: 01^{h} 56^{m} 40.20252^{s}
- Declination: −22° 31′ 36.4249″
- Apparent magnitude (V): 4.85

Characteristics
- Evolutionary stage: red giant branch
- Spectral type: K3III
- U−B color index: +1.67
- B−V color index: +1.434±0.005

Astrometry
Radial velocity (R_{v})	+27.21±0.18 km/s
Proper motion (μ)	RA: +60.374 mas/yr Dec.: −24.635 mas/yr
Parallax (π)	7.3290±0.1264 mas
Distance	445 ± 8 ly (136 ± 2 pc)
Absolute magnitude (M_{V})	−0.25

Details
Mass	1.27 M_{☉}
Radius	35.0 R_{☉}
Luminosity	453 L_{☉}
Surface gravity (log g)	1.88 cgs
Temperature	4,218 K
Metallicity [Fe/H]	−0.18 dex
Rotational velocity (v sin i)	1.3 km/s
Age	2.9 Myr

Other designations
- 56 Cet, CD−23°721, GC 2343, HD 11930, HIP 9061, HR 565, SAO 167416

Database references
SIMBAD	data

56 Ceti is a single star located in the equatorial constellation of Cetus. Not found in the original Bayer catalogue, it was given the Bayer-like designation Upsilon^{1} Ceti by Flamsteed to distinguish it from Bayer's Upsilon Ceti, which Flamsteed designated Upsilon^{2} or 59 Ceti. In 1801, J. E. Bode included this designation in his Uranographia, but the superscripted designations Upsilon^{1} and Upsilon^{2} are not in general use today. 56 Ceti is the Flamsteed designation for this star.

This star is visible to the naked eye as a faint, orange-hued point of light with an apparent visual magnitude of 4.85. It is located about 445 light years from the Sun, based on parallax, and is drifting further away with a radial velocity of +27 km/s. 56 Ceti is an aging giant star with a stellar classification of K3III, having exhausted the supply of hydrogen at its core and expanded to 35 times the Sun's radius. It is radiating 453 times the luminosity of the Sun from its enlarged photosphere at an effective temperature of 4,217 K.
