= HD 10550 =

Star in the constellation Cetus

Observation data Epoch J2000 Equinox J2000
- Constellation: Cetus
- Right ascension: 01^{h} 42^{m} 43.51077^{s}
- Declination: −03° 41′ 24.7210″
- Apparent magnitude (V): 4.98

Characteristics
- Spectral type: K2/3 III CN II
- B−V color index: 1.378±0.003

Astrometry
Radial velocity (R_{v})	−33.28±0.15 km/s
Proper motion (μ)	RA: −8.989 mas/yr Dec.: −33.238 mas/yr
Parallax (π)	2.9564±0.1730 mas
Distance	1,100 ± 60 ly (340 ± 20 pc)
Absolute magnitude (M_{V})	−2.82

Details
Radius	77 R_{☉}
Luminosity	2,537 L_{☉}
Surface gravity (log g)	1.83 cgs
Temperature	4,110 K
Metallicity [Fe/H]	−0.12 dex
Rotational velocity (v sin i)	10 km/s

Other designations
- BD−04°260, FK5 1049, HD 10550, HIP 7999, HR 500, SAO 129465

Database references
SIMBAD	data

HD 10550 is a single star in the equatorial constellation of Cetus. It is a faint star but visible to the naked eye with an apparent visual magnitude of 4.98. Based upon an annual parallax shift of 2.9564 mas, it is located around 1,100 light years from the Sun. The star is moving closer with a heliocentric radial velocity of −33 km/s. It has a high peculiar velocity of 72.7+5.7
−4.3 km/s and may be a runaway star.

The stellar classification of this star is K2/3 III CN II, showing the spectrum of an evolved K-type giant star with an overabundance of CN in the atmosphere. The measured angular diameter of this star, after correction for limb darkening, is 2.11±0.04 mas. At the estimated distance of this star, this yields a physical size of about 77 times the radius of the Sun. The star is radiating around 2,537 times the Sun's luminosity from its enlarged photosphere at an effective temperature of 4,110 K.
