= 46 Ceti =

Star in the constellation Cetus

- Location of 46 Ceti (circled in red)

Observation data Epoch J2000 Equinox ICRS
- Constellation: Cetus
- Right ascension: 01^{h} 25^{m} 37.23270^{s}
- Declination: −14° 35′ 55.6414″
- Apparent magnitude (V): 4.907

Characteristics
- Spectral type: K2+ III–IIIb CN0.5
- U−B color index: +1.26
- B−V color index: +1.231±0.009

Astrometry
Radial velocity (R_{v})	−22.6±0.7 km/s
Proper motion (μ)	RA: +44.670 mas/yr Dec.: −17.216 mas/yr
Parallax (π)	11.9466±0.3140 mas
Distance	273 ± 7 ly (84 ± 2 pc)
Absolute magnitude (M_{V})	+0.19

Details
Mass	1.38 M_{☉}
Radius	19 R_{☉}
Luminosity	132 L_{☉}
Surface gravity (log g)	2.2 cgs
Temperature	4,316±89 K
Metallicity [Fe/H]	–0.32 dex
Rotational velocity (v sin i)	0.0 km/s
Age	4.17 Gyr

Other designations
- BD−15°266, HD 8705, HIP 6670, HR 412, SAO 147803

Database references
SIMBAD	data

46 Ceti is a single star in the equatorial constellation of Cetus. It is visible to the naked eye with an apparent visual magnitude of 4.9. The distance to this star, as determined from an annual parallax shift of 11.9 mas, is about 273 light years. It is moving closer to the Earth with a heliocentric radial velocity of −23 km/s, and is expected to come as close as 184 light-years in 2.2 million years.

At the age of about four billion years, this is an evolved K-type giant star with a stellar classification of K2+ III–IIIb CN0.5. The suffix notation CN0.5 indicates a mild overabundance of cyanogen in the stellar atmosphere. It has 1.38 times the mass of the Sun and has expanded to 19 times the Sun's radius. The star is radiating 132 times the Sun's luminosity from its enlarged photosphere at an effective temperature of 4,316 K. The projected rotational velocity is too small to be measured.
