= Eta Ceti =

Star in the constellation Cetus

η Ceti
- Location of η Ceti (circled)

Observation data Epoch J2000.0 Equinox ICRS
- Constellation: Cetus
- Right ascension: 01^{h} 08^{m} 35.39133^{s}
- Declination: −10° 10′ 56.1519″
- Apparent magnitude (V): +3.446

Characteristics
- Evolutionary stage: Red-giant branch
- Spectral type: K2−IIIb
- U−B color index: +1.194
- B−V color index: +1.161

Astrometry
Radial velocity (R_{v})	+11.74±0.30 km/s
Proper motion (μ)	RA: +215.922 mas/yr Dec.: −139.029 mas/yr
Parallax (π)	27.0603±0.1799 mas
Distance	120.5 ± 0.8 ly (37.0 ± 0.2 pc)
Absolute magnitude (M_{V})	+0.68

Details
Mass	1.7±0.1 M_{☉}
Radius	13.2±0.1 R_{☉}
Luminosity	74.0±3.7 L_{☉}
Surface gravity (log g)	2.5 cgs
Temperature	4,543±24 K
Metallicity [Fe/H]	−0.03 dex
Rotational velocity (v sin i)	4.8 km/s
Age	1.80 Gyr

Other designations
- Gajahmina, Deneb Algenubi, Dheneb, η Ceti, 31 Ceti, BD−10 240, FK5 40, HD 6805, HIP 5364, HR 334, SAO 147632, 2MASS J01083539-1010560

Database references
SIMBAD	data

Eta Ceti, also named Gajahmina, is a star in the equatorial constellation of Cetus. The apparent visual magnitude of this star is +3.4, making it the fourth-brightest star in this otherwise relatively faint constellation and visible to the naked eye. The distance to this star can be measured directly using the parallax technique, yielding a value of 120.5 light-years (36.9 parsecs). It is drifting further from the Sun with a line of sight velocity component of +12 km/s.

== Nomenclature ==
Eta Ceti is the star's Bayer designation, which is Latinized from η Ceti and abbreviated Eta Cet or η Cet.

It had the traditional name Deneb Algenubi or Dheneb, from Arabic ذنب القيطس الجنوبي – al-dhanab al-qayṭas al-janūbī, meaning the southern tail of the sea monster. In the catalogue of stars in the Calendarium of Al Achsasi al Mouakket, this star was designated Aoul al Naamat (أول النعامات – awwil al naʽāmāt), which was translated into Latin as Prima Struthionum, meaning the first ostrich. This star, along with θ Cet (Tiancang), τ Cet, ζ Cet (Baten Kaitos) and υ Cet (Alnaamaat), were Al Naʽāmāt (النعامات), the Hen Ostriches.

In Chinese astronomy, 天倉 (Tiān Cāng), meaning Square Celestial Granary, refers to an asterism consisting of η Ceti, ι Ceti, θ Ceti, ζ Ceti, τ Ceti and 57 Ceti. Consequently, the Chinese name for η Ceti itself is 天倉二 (Tiān Cāng èr, English: the Second Star of Square Celestial Granary).

Gajahmina, a Sanskrit-derived term meaning "elephant-fish", is a constellation used in Bali (Indonesia), corresponding to Cetus. It represents a Balinese mythological creature. The IAU Working Group on Star Names adopted the name Gajahmina for this star on 15 October 2026.

== Properties ==
This is a giant star that has been chosen a standard for the stellar classification of K2−IIIb. It has exhausted the hydrogen at its core and evolved away from the main sequence of stars like the Sun. (The classification is sometimes listed as K1.5 IIICN1Fe0.5, indicating a strong CN star with higher-than-normal abundance of cyanogen and iron relative to other stars of its class.) It is probably on the red giant branch fusing hydrogen in a shell, although there is a possibility that it is a red clump star that is generating energy through the nuclear fusion of helium at its core.

Eta Ceti has 1.7 times more mass than the Sun and its surface has expanded to 13 times the Sun's radius. It is radiating 74 times as much luminosity as the Sun from its photosphere at an effective temperature of 4,356 K. This heat gives the star the orange-hued glow of a K-type star.

== Planetary system ==
In 2014, two exoplanets around the star were discovered using the radial velocity method. Planets discovered by radial velocity have poorly known masses because if the orbit of the planets were inclined away from the line of sight, a much larger mass would have to compensate for the angle in order to generate the measured signal.

Eta Ceti b has a minimum mass of 2.55 M_{J} and an orbital period of 403.5 days (about 1.1 years), while Eta Ceti c has a minimum mass of 3.32 M_{J} and an orbital period of 751.9 days (2.06 years). Assuming the orbits of the two are coplanar, then the two planets must be locked in a 2:1 orbital resonance, otherwise the system would become dynamically unstable. Although the inclinations from the line of sight are unknown, the value is constrained to be 70° or less: if any higher, the higher masses would render the system dynamically unstable, with no stable solutions.

The Eta Ceti planetary system
Companion (in order from star)	Mass	Semimajor axis (AU)	Orbital period (days)	Eccentricity	Inclination (°)	Radius
b	≥2.55 ± 0.13 M_{J}	1.27	403.5 ± 1.5	0.13 ± 0.05	—	—
c	≥3.32 ± 0.18 M_{J}	1.93	751.9 ± 3.8	0.1 ± 0.06	—	—
