= 84 Ceti =

Binary star system in the constellation Cetus

Observation data Epoch J2000 Equinox ICRS
- Constellation: Cetus
- Right ascension: 02^{h} 41^{m} 13.99720^{s}
- Declination: −00° 41′ 44.3845″
- Apparent magnitude (V): 5.709

Characteristics
- Spectral type: F7V + K2V
- U−B color index: −0.047
- B−V color index: +0.522

Astrometry
Radial velocity (R_{v})	+3.90 km/s
Proper motion (μ)	RA: +216.51 mas/yr Dec.: −129.33 mas/yr
Parallax (π)	44.27±0.84 mas
Distance	74 ± 1 ly (22.6 ± 0.4 pc)
Absolute magnitude (M_{V})	+3.95

Details

84 Cet A
Mass	1.168 M_{☉}
Radius	1.208±0.029 R_{☉}
Luminosity	2.133±0.083 L_{☉}
Temperature	6,356±46 K
Metallicity [Fe/H]	−0.15 dex
Rotational velocity (v sin i)	32.0 km/s
Age	2.1 Gyr

Other designations
- 84 Cet, BD−01°377, HD 16765, HIP 12530, HR 790, SAO 130055.

Database references
SIMBAD	data

84 Ceti is the Flamsteed designation for a binary star system in the equatorial constellation of Cetus. It has an apparent visual magnitude of 5.7, making it faintly visible to the naked eye from dark suburban skies. Parallax measurements with the Hipparcos spacecraft put this system at a distance of around 74 light years.

The primary, 84 Ceti A, is an F-type main sequence star with a stellar classification of F7V. It is slightly larger than the Sun, with 117% of the Sun's mass, 121% of the radius, and 213% of the luminosity. The abundance of elements more massive than helium is 71% of the Sun's and it has a relatively high projected rotational velocity of 32 km/s. This star is estimated to be less than half the age of the Sun, at 2.1 billion years.

The secondary component, 84 Ceti B, has a classification of K2V, making it a K-type main sequence star. It lies at an angular separation of 3.3″ from the primary, which is equivalent to a physical separation of at least 74.5 AU.

The space velocity components of this system are: –13(U), –25(V), –2(W) km/s. Based upon the position and motion, it is a candidate member of the Tucana-Horologium Association; this is a group of stars that share a similar motion through space and hence may have originated in the same molecular cloud. 84 Ceti is following an orbit through the Milky Way galaxy that has an eccentricity of 0.03, taking it as close as 22.3 kly (6.83 kpc) and as far as 26.2 kly (8.02 kpc) from the Galactic Center. The inclination of the orbital plane carries it as far as 260 ly (80 pc) away from the galactic plane.
