= 1 Ceti =

Star in the constellation Cetus

Observation data Epoch J2000 Equinox ICRS
- Constellation: Cetus
- Right ascension: 23^{h} 58^{m} 21.22498^{s}
- Declination: −15° 50′ 50.9410″
- Apparent magnitude (V): +6.276

Characteristics
- Evolutionary stage: red giant branch
- Spectral type: K1III CNII
- U−B color index: +1.03
- B−V color index: +1.08

Astrometry
Radial velocity (R_{v})	4.3±2 km/s
Proper motion (μ)	RA: +82.986 mas/yr Dec.: −7.951 mas/yr
Parallax (π)	6.1526±0.0329 mas
Distance	530 ± 3 ly (162.5 ± 0.9 pc)
Absolute magnitude (M_{V})	−0.10

Details
Mass	2.4 M_{☉}
Radius	13.9 R_{☉}
Luminosity	83 L_{☉}
Surface gravity (log g)	2.60 cgs
Temperature	4,906 K
Metallicity [Fe/H]	0.05 dex
Rotational velocity (v sin i)	3.1 km/s
Age	2.0 Gyr

Other designations
- 1 Cet, BD−16°6394, FK5 3925, GC 33242, HD 224481, HIP 118178, HR 9065, SAO 165972

Database references
SIMBAD	data

1 Ceti is a star in the constellation of Cetus. With an apparent magnitude of about 6.2, the star is barely visible to the naked eye (see Bortle scale). Parallax estimates put it at a distance of about 530 light-years (162.5 parsecs) away from the Earth. It is moving further from the Sun with a heliocentric radial velocity of 4 km/s.

This star has a spectral type of K1III, implying a K-type giant. These types of stars are generally reddish-colored stars with spectral types from K to M, with radii that are 10 to 100 times larger than the Sun. The "CNII" in its spectral type indicates strong cyanogen signature in its outer atmosphere. The star is radiating 83 times the Sun's luminosity from its enlarged photosphere.
