= 39 Ceti =

Variable star in the constellation Cetus

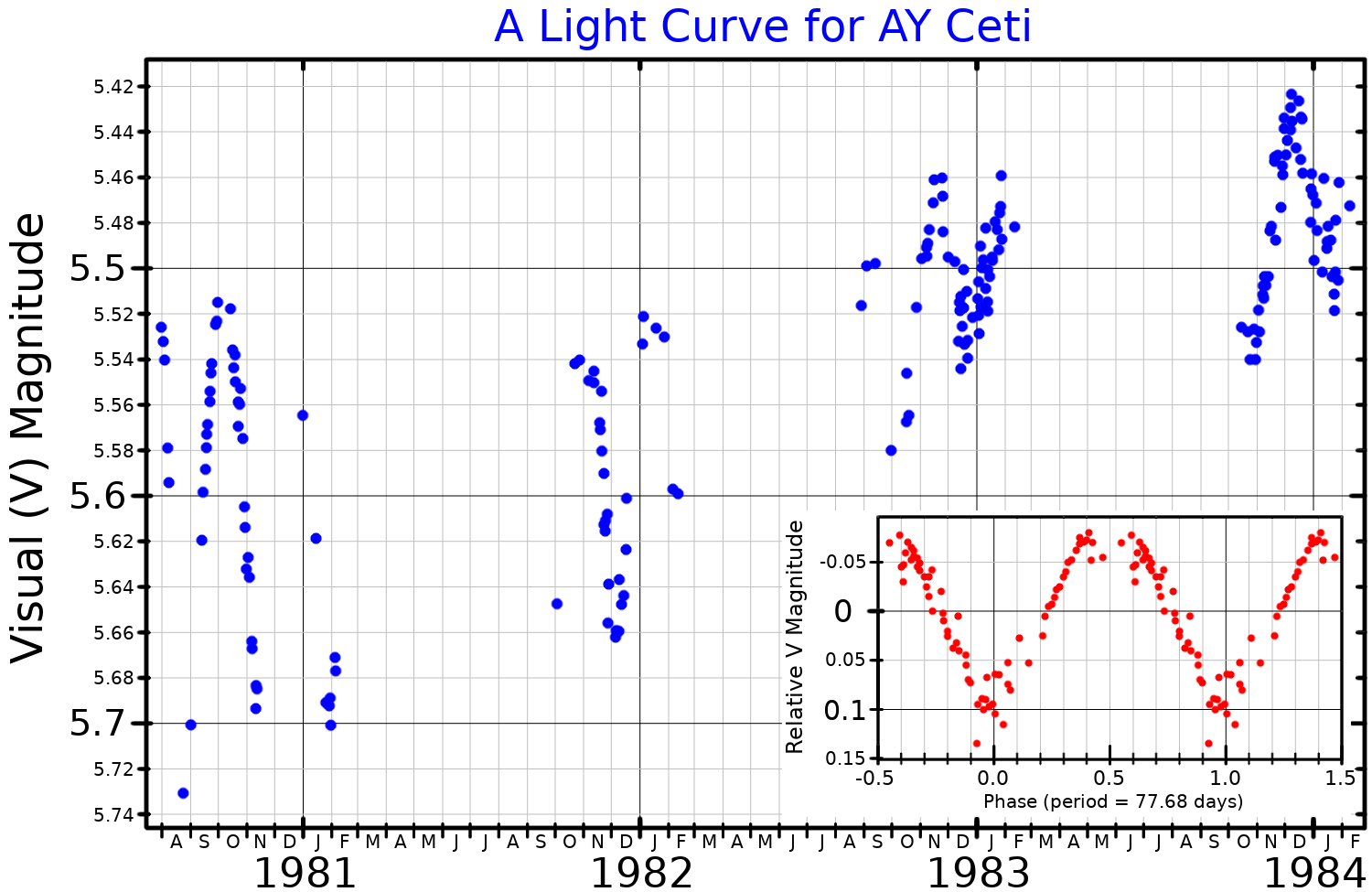
- A light curve for AY Ceti. The main plot, adapted from Poretti et al., shows the long-term variability. The inset plot, adapted from Eaton et al., shows data from 1980 - 1982, folded with the photometric period.

Observation data Epoch J2000.0 Equinox ICRS
- Constellation: Cetus
- Right ascension: 01^{h} 16^{m} 36.28795^{s}
- Declination: −02° 30′ 01.3286″
- Apparent magnitude (V): 5.35 - 5.58

Characteristics
- Evolutionary stage: red clump
- Spectral type: G5IIIe
- B−V color index: 0.87
- Variable type: RS CVn

Astrometry
Radial velocity (R_{v})	−23.28±0.04 km/s
Proper motion (μ)	RA: −100.333±0.118 mas/yr Dec.: −63.689±0.061 mas/yr
Parallax (π)	13.3622±0.0922 mas
Distance	244 ± 2 ly (74.8 ± 0.5 pc)
Absolute magnitude (M_{V})	0.81

Orbit
Primary	A
Name	B (white dwarf)
Period (P)	56.824±0.011 d
Semi-major axis (a)	(5.57±0.10)×10^{6} km
Eccentricity (e)	0.0 (assumed)
Periastron epoch (T)	2446336.205
Semi-amplitude (K_{1}) (primary)	7.13±0.13 km/s

Details

A
Mass	2.2 M_{☉}
Radius	6.8 R_{☉}
Luminosity	45 L_{☉}
Surface gravity (log g)	3.0 cgs
Temperature	5,080 K
Metallicity [Fe/H]	−0.33 dex
Rotation	75.12 d
Rotational velocity (v sin i)	4.58 km/s
Age	1.3 Gyr

B (white dwarf)
Mass	0.55 M_{☉}
Radius	0.012 R_{☉}
Luminosity	0.014 L_{☉}
Surface gravity (log g)	8.00 cgs
Temperature	18,000 K

Other designations
- 39 Ceti, HD 7672, HR 373, HIP 5951, SAO 129204, BD−03 172

Database references
SIMBAD	data

39 Ceti, also known as AY Ceti, is a star about 244 light years from Earth in the constellation Cetus. It is a 5th magnitude star, making it faintly visible to the naked eye of an observer far from city lights. AY Ceti is an RS Canum Venaticorum variable (RS CVn) star, varying in brightness from magnitude 5.35 to 5.58 over a period of about 77 days.

In 1962, Alan Cousins discovered that 39 Ceti is a variable star, varying by just 0.12 magnitudes during the five nights that he observed it. In 1976 it was given the variable star designation AY Ceti. In 1983, Joel Eaton et al. examined photoelectric photometry data for the star spanning more than a decade, and determined that the brightness varied periodically by 0.18 magnitudes every 77.68±0.05 days. They stated that 39 Ceti's variability and spectral features lead them to believe it is an RS CVn star. Long term monitoring by Ennio Poretti et al. showed that the amplitude of the brightness oscillations is not constant, and there are secular drifts in the average brightness over timescales much longer than the phototmetric period.

In 1982, Theodore Simon et al. announced that IUE spectra revealed that 39 Ceti is a spectroscopic binary, with a hot white dwarf (component B) companion orbiting a cooler star (component A). They also announced the detection of radio wavelength flare events. In 1985 follow-up publication, these authors derived an orbital period of 56.80±0.03 days, differing by more than 20 days from the photometric period, making 39 Ceti one of the few (just two known at that time) RS CVn systems for which the orbital and photometric periods are grossly different.

39 Ceti A is believed to be a star on its first ascent up the red-giant branch, close to the bottom of the red giant branch where first dredge-up occurs. It is thought to be undergoing the dredge-up now, but with convection not yet reaching the core of the star.

== Notes ==
1.These orbital elements were derived assuming a circular orbit. An earlier derivation found non-zero eccentricity of ~0.1.
