= 64 Ceti =

Subgiant in the constellation Cetus

Observation data Epoch J2000 Equinox J2000
- Constellation: Cetus
- Right ascension: 02^{h} 11^{m} 21.079^{s}
- Declination: +08° 34′ 11.31″
- Apparent magnitude (V): 5.623±0.01

Characteristics
- Evolutionary stage: Subgiant
- Spectral type: G0IV
- Apparent magnitude (B): 6.189
- Apparent magnitude (R): 6.81
- Apparent magnitude (G): 5.497
- Apparent magnitude (J): 4.763
- Apparent magnitude (H): 4.373
- Apparent magnitude (K): 4.308
- B−V color index: 0.57

Astrometry
Radial velocity (R_{v})	−19.01±0.22 km/s
Proper motion (μ)	RA: −141.042 mas/yr Dec.: −113.463 mas/yr
Parallax (π)	23.7901±0.066 mas
Distance	137.1 ± 0.4 ly (42.0 ± 0.1 pc)
Absolute magnitude (M_{V})	2.59

Details
Mass	1.53±0.04 M_{☉}
Radius	2.56±0.56 R_{☉}
Luminosity	8.13 (Note: from a logarithm of 0.91) L_{☉}
Surface gravity (log g)	3.81±0.09 cgs
Temperature	6066±42 K
Metallicity [Fe/H]	0.14±0.04 dex
Rotation	15 days (Note: The rotational period is calculated using the star's circumference (π*diameter (km)) and later divided by the rotational period. The value will be divided by 86400 to convert from seconds to days.)
Rotational velocity (v sin i)	8.96±1.52 km/s
Age	2.63 (Note: From a logarithm of 9.42.) Gyr

Other designations
- 64 Ceti, HD 13421, HIP 10212, HR 635, SAO 110390, PPM 145360, LSPM J0211+0834, TIC 337046898, GSC 00630-01238, IRAS 02087+0820, WISE J021120.97+083410.1, Gaia DR2 2521857809546128896, Gaia DR3 2521857809546128896

Database references
SIMBAD	data

64 Ceti is a star located in the constellation Cetus. Based on its spectral type of G0IV, it is a G-type star that has left the main sequence and evolved into a subgiant. It is located 42 parsecs (137 light-years) away and it is moving towards Earth at a velocity of 19 km/s. The apparent magnitude of 64 Ceti is 5.62, which makes it visible to the naked eye only in dark skies, far away from light pollution.

== Characteristics ==
64 Ceti is a G-type star that has left the main sequence and now evolved into a subgiant, based on its spectral type of G0IV and evolutionary models. It has about 1.53 times the Sun's mass and has expanded to 2.53 times the Sun's diameter. It is emitting 8.13 times the solar luminosity from its photosphere at an effective temperature of 6,066 K. The age of 64 Ceti is estimated at 2.63 billion years, about 58% of the Solar System's age, (Note: The Solar System has an age of 4.532 billion years.) and it rotates under its axis at a speed of 8.96 km/s, translating into a rotation period of 15 days. The B-V index of the star is 0.57, corresponding to a yellow-white hue of a late G/early F star. (Note: See the Color index article)

It is located in the constellation Cetus, based on its celestial coordinates. Gaia DR3 measured a parallax of 23.8 mas for this star, translating into a distance of 42.02 parsecs (137.1 light-years). The absolute magnitude, i.e. its brightness if it was seen at a distance of 10 pc (32.6 ly), is 2.59. It has a high proper motion across the sky and belongs to the thin disk population, being located 31.03 parsecs (101.2 ly) above the galactic plane.
