= Upsilon Ceti =

Star in the constellation Cetus

υ Ceti
- Location of υ Ceti (circled)

Observation data Epoch J2000.0 Equinox J2000.0 (ICRS)
- Constellation: Cetus
- Right ascension: 02^{h} 00^{m} 00.308^{s}
- Declination: −21° 04′ 40.194″
- Apparent magnitude (V): 3.95

Characteristics
- Spectral type: M0III
- U−B color index: +1.90
- B−V color index: +1.57

Astrometry
Radial velocity (R_{v})	+18.00±0.70 km/s
Proper motion (μ)	RA: +133.922 mas/yr Dec.: −24.341 mas/yr
Parallax (π)	10.2726±0.1451 mas
Distance	318 ± 4 ly (97 ± 1 pc)
Absolute magnitude (M_{V})	−0.77

Details
Mass	1.26±0.13 M_{☉}
Radius	53.56±11.80 R_{☉}
Luminosity	549.6±226.8 L_{☉}
Surface gravity (log g)	1.15±0.18 cgs
Temperature	3,822±148 K
Metallicity [Fe/H]	−0.06±0.10 dex
Age	6.97±2.77 Gyr

Other designations
- Alnaamaat, υ Cet, 59 Cet, BD−21°358, FK5 71, HD 12274, HIP 9347, HR 585, SAO 167471

Database references
SIMBAD	data

Upsilon Ceti, also named Alnaamaat, is a solitary star in the equatorial constellation of Cetus. This star is visible to the naked eye with an apparent visual magnitude of 3.95. Based upon an annual parallax shift of 10.27 mas, it is located about 318 light-years (97 pc) from the Sun. It is drifting further away with a line of sight velocity component of +18 km/s.

== Nomenclature ==
Upsilon Ceti is a Bayer designation that is Latinized from υ Ceti, and abbreviated Upsilon Cet or υ Cet. This star was designated Upsilon Ceti by Bayer and 59 Ceti by Flamsteed. Flamsteed gave it the designation Upsilon^{2} Ceti to distinguish it from 56 Ceti, which he called Upsilon^{1}. Flamsteed's superscripted designations, however, are not in general use today.

For ancient Arab astronomers, this star with η Cet (Gajahmina), θ Cet (Tiancang), τ Cet and ζ Cet (Baten Kaitos), formed Al Naʽāmāt (النعامات), the Hen Ostriches. The IAU Working Group on Star Names adopted the name Alnaamaat for υ Ceti on 15 October 2026, after the Arabic asterism.

In Chinese astronomy, 鈇鑕 (Fū Zhì), meaning Sickle, refers to an asterism consisting of υ Ceti, 48 Ceti and 56 Ceti. Consequently, the Chinese name for υ Ceti itself is 鈇鑕四 (Fū Zhì sì, English: the Fourth Star of Sickle.)

== Properties ==
Upsilon Ceti is an evolved red giant star with a stellar classification of M0III and is listed as a standard for that class. This suggests the star has consumed the supply of hydrogen at its core and expanded away from the main sequence. The star has previously been classified as K5/M0III, an interesting example of one of the "gaps" in the Morgan-Keenan classification system, with K6-9 often not used for giant stars or used only to indicate a fraction of the way between K5 and M0.

At an estimated age of seven billion years, there is an 84% chance that this star is on the red giant branch, or 16% to be on the horizontal branch. Stellar models based on the red giant branch status yield an estimated mass of around 126% of the Sun's mass and 54 times the radius of the Sun. This model indicates the star radiates around 550 times the solar luminosity from its outer atmosphere at an effective temperature of 3,822 K.
