= 9 Ceti =

Star in the constellation Cetus

- Location of 9 Ceti (circled in red)

Observation data Epoch J2000.0 Equinox ICRS
- Constellation: Cetus
- Right ascension: 00^{h} 22^{m} 51.788^{s}
- Declination: −12° 12′ 33.97″
- Apparent magnitude (V): 6.38 - 6.43

Characteristics
- Evolutionary stage: main sequence
- Spectral type: G3 V
- U−B color index: +0.09
- B−V color index: +0.659±0.004
- Variable type: BY Dra

Astrometry
| Radial velocity (R_{v}) | −2.53±0.09 km/s |
| Proper motion (μ) | RA: +394.388 mas/yr Dec.: +60.893 mas/yr |
| Parallax (π) | 46.8742±0.0270 mas |
| Distance | 69.58 ± 0.04 ly (21.33 ± 0.01 pc) |
| Absolute magnitude (M_{V}) | 4.79 |

Details
| Mass | 1.09 M_{☉} |
| Radius | 1.05±0.01 R_{☉} |
| Luminosity | 1.095±0.002 L_{☉} |
| Surface gravity (log g) | 4.47 cgs |
| Temperature | 5,761+29 −34 K |
| Metallicity [Fe/H] | 0.178 dex |
| Rotation | 7.655 d |
| Rotational velocity (v sin i) | 7.2±0.5 km/s |
| Age | 850 Myr |

Other designations
- 9 Cet, BE Cet, BD−13°60, GJ 17.3, GJ 9012, HD 1835, HIP 1803, HR 88, SAO 147237

Database references
| SIMBAD | data |
| ARICNS | data |

9 Ceti is a star in the equatorial constellation of Cetus. It has the variable star designation BE Ceti, while 9 Ceti is the Flamsteed designation. It has an apparent visual magnitude of 6.4, which is below the limit that can be seen with the naked eye by a typical observer. (According to the Bortle scale, it is possible for some observers to see it from dark rural skies.) Based upon parallax measurements, this star is 69.6 light years away from the Sun.

This is a solar analog, which is defined as a "Population I dwarf with gross properties not very different from those of the Sun". It is a G-type main sequence star with a stellar classification of G3 V, which means it is generating energy through the fusion of hydrogen into helium at its core. The mass and radius of the star are similar to the Sun, although the abundance of elements other than hydrogen and helium is about 50% greater. It is much younger than the Sun, being an estimated 850 million years of age. The effective temperature of the stellar atmosphere is around 5,807 K, giving it the yellow-hued glow of a G-type star.

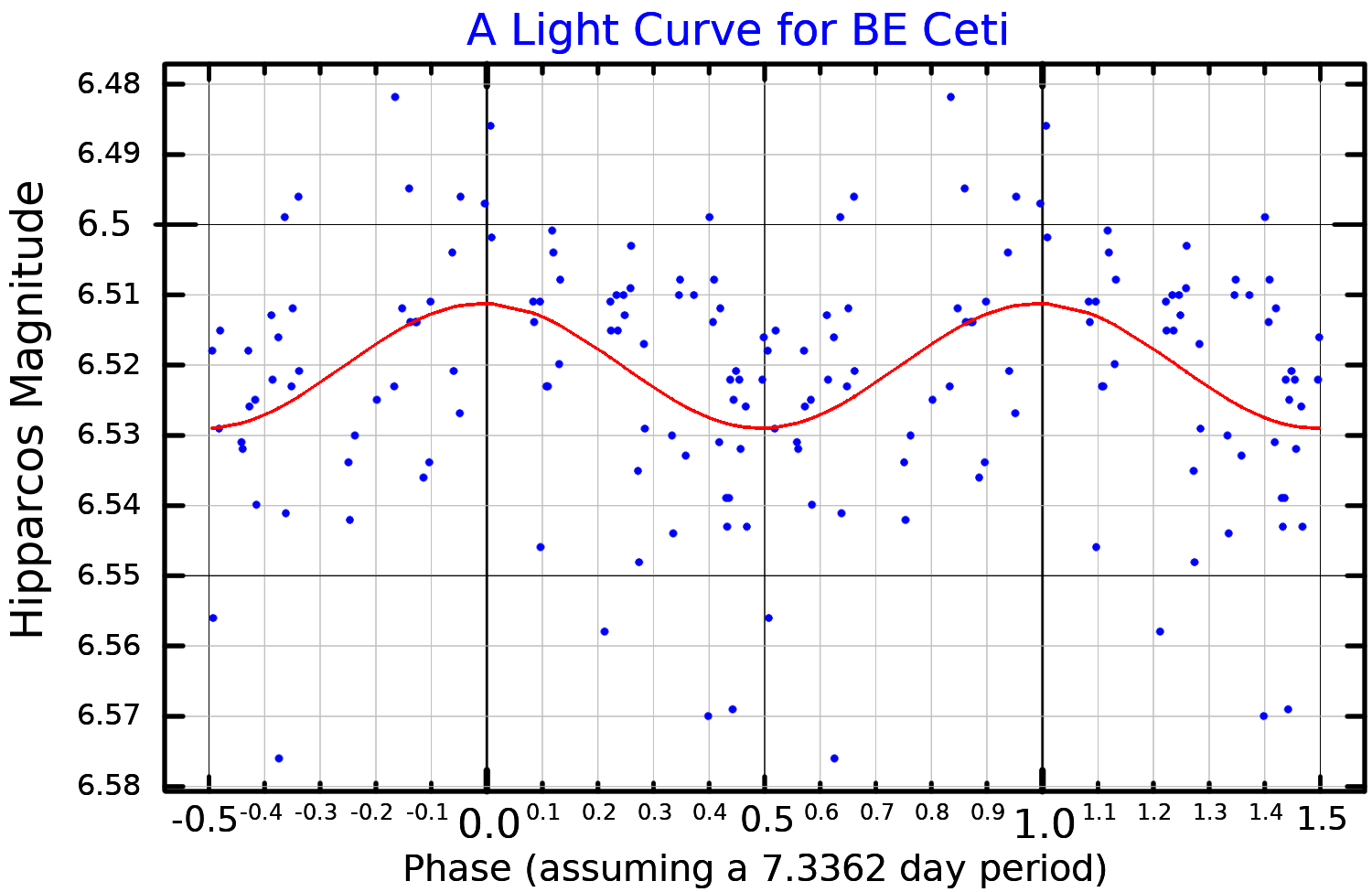
A light curve for BE Ceti, plotted from Hipparcos data. The red line is the best fit sine wave.

In 1980, this was found to be a variable star with a periodicity of 7.655 days, and it was given variable star designation BE Ceti. This variation in luminosity was interpreted to be the result of rotational modulation of star spot activity in the photosphere, and hence it is classified as a BY Draconis variable. There is considerable variation in the strength of the surface activity—to the point where it has appeared inactive during some observation runs. The strength of the surface magnetic field was measured to be 450 G. The spectrum of this star includes lines of titanium oxide and calcium hydride, which, for a star of this class, is further evidence of star spot activity. Star spots cover an estimated 3% of the surface.

9 Ceti has been examined for evidence of a planetary companion or a debris disk, but as of 2015 none has been found. The age of the star and its motion through space suggest that it is a member of the Hyades stellar kinematic group.

There is a magnitude 12.57 optical companion at an angular separation of 214 arc seconds from 9 Ceti along a position angle of 294° (as of 1999). The pair are not physically associated as they have different proper motions and the fainter star has a much smaller parallax.
