= Zeta Ceti =

Binary star in the constellation Cetus

ζ Ceti
- Location of ζ Ceti (circled)

Observation data Epoch J2000.0 Equinox J2000.0 (ICRS)
- Constellation: Cetus
- Right ascension: 01^{h} 51^{m} 27.631^{s}
- Declination: −10° 20′ 06.11″
- Apparent magnitude (V): 3.742

Characteristics
- Spectral type: K0 III Ba0.1
- U−B color index: +1.076
- B−V color index: +1.131
- Variable type: Suspected

Astrometry
Radial velocity (R_{v})	+10.86±0.64 km/s
Proper motion (μ)	RA: +39.752 mas/yr Dec.: −40.956 mas/yr
Parallax (π)	12.8770±0.2100 mas
Distance	253 ± 4 ly (78 ± 1 pc)
Absolute magnitude (M_{V})	−0.54

Orbit
Period (P)	1,652 d
Eccentricity (e)	0.59
Longitude of the node (Ω)	85°
Periastron epoch (T)	2414377 JD
Semi-amplitude (K_{1}) (primary)	3.3 km/s

Details

ζ Cet A
Mass	2.34 M_{☉}
Radius	25 R_{☉}
Luminosity	240 L_{☉}
Surface gravity (log g)	2.4 cgs
Temperature	4,581±14 K
Metallicity [Fe/H]	−0.13 dex
Rotational velocity (v sin i)	3.2 km/s
Age	1.24 Gyr

Other designations
- Baten Kaitos, ζ Cet, 55 Cet, BD−11°359, FK5 62, HD 11353, HIP 8645, HR 539, SAO 148059, WDS J01515-1020A

Database references
SIMBAD	data

Zeta Ceti is a binary star system in the equatorial constellation of Cetus. Its name is a Bayer designation that is Latinized from ζ Ceti, and abbreviated Zeta Cet or ζ Cet. The system has a combined apparent visual magnitude of 3.74, which is bright enough to be seen with the naked eye as a point of light. Based upon parallax measurements, it is approximately 253 light-years (78 pc) distant from the Earth. The system is drifting further from the Sun with a line of sight velocity component of +11 km/s.

Zeta Ceti is the primary or 'A' component of a double star system designated WDS J01515-1020 (the secondary or 'B' component is HD 11366). Zeta Ceti's two components are therefore designated WDS J01515-1020 Aa and Ab. Aa is officially named Baten Kaitos /ˈbeɪtən ˈkeɪtɒs/, the traditional name of the entire system.

== Nomenclature ==
ζ Ceti (Latinised to Zeta Ceti) is the binary pair's Bayer designation. WDS J01515-1020 A is its designation in the Washington Double Star Catalog. The designations of the two components as WDS J01515-1020 Aa and Ab derive from the convention used by the Washington Multiplicity Catalog (WMC) for multiple star systems, and adopted by the International Astronomical Union (IAU).

It bore the traditional name Baten Kaitos, derived from the Arabic بطن قيطس batn qaytus "belly of the sea monster". In 2016, the International Astronomical Union organized a Working Group on Star Names (WGSN) to catalogue and standardize proper names for stars. The WGSN decided to attribute proper names to individual stars rather than entire multiple systems. It approved the name Baten Kaitos for the component WDS J01515-1020 Aa on 12 September 2016 and it is now so included in the List of IAU-approved Star Names.

In the catalogue of stars in the Calendarium of Al Achsasi al Mouakket, this star was designated Rabah al Naamat رابع ألنعامة raabi3 al naʽāmāt, which was translated into Latin as Quarta Struthionum, meaning "the fourth ostrich". This star, along with Eta Ceti (Gajahmina), Theta Ceti (Tiancang), Tau Ceti, and Upsilon Ceti (Alnaamaat) formed Al Naʽāmāt ('ألنعامة), "the Hen Ostriches".

In Chinese, 天倉 (Tiān Cāng), meaning Square Celestial Granary, refers to an asterism consisting of Zeta Ceti, Iota Ceti, Theta Ceti, Eta Ceti, Tau Ceti and 57 Ceti. Consequently, the Chinese name for Zeta Ceti itself is 天倉四 (Tiān Cāng sì, English: the Fourth Star of Square Celestial Granary).

== In popular culture ==
The 2003 Japanese role-playing video game Baten Kaitos: Eternal Wings and the Lost Ocean takes its name from Baten Kaitos.

In the light novel series Re:Zero, the character Lye Batenkaitos is named after Baten Kaitos.

== Properties ==
Zeta Ceti is a single-lined spectroscopic binary system with an orbital period of 4.5 years and an eccentricity of 0.59. The primary, Baten Kaitos, is an evolved K-type giant star with a stellar classification of K0 III Ba0.1. The suffix notation indicates this is a weak barium star, showing slightly stronger than normal lines of singly-ionized barium. This star has an estimated 2.34 times the mass of the Sun and, at an estimated age of 1.24 billion years, has expanded to 25 times the Sun's radius.

HD 11366 (WDS J01515-1020B), of spectral type K0 III, is further away (419 parsecs, compared to WDS J01515-1020A's 72 parsecs), and is therefore not a member of the system but a chance alignment – this is referred to as an optical companion.
