= Theta Ceti =

Orange-hued giant star in the constellation Cetus

- Location of θ Ceti (circled in red)

Observation data Epoch J2000.0 Equinox J2000.0 (ICRS)
- Constellation: Cetus
- Right ascension: 01^{h} 24^{m} 01.40328^{s}
- Declination: −08° 10′ 59.7392″
- Apparent magnitude (V): 3.60

Characteristics
- Evolutionary stage: red clump
- Spectral type: K0 III
- B−V color index: +1.07

Astrometry
Radial velocity (R_{v})	+17.2±0.5 km/s
Proper motion (μ)	RA: −76.226 mas/yr Dec.: −201.519 mas/yr
Parallax (π)	29.0339±0.2198 mas
Distance	112.3 ± 0.9 ly (34.4 ± 0.3 pc)
Absolute magnitude (M_{V})	+0.89

Details
Mass	1.80 M_{☉}
Radius	10.37±0.09 R_{☉}
Luminosity	58.3±3.0 L_{☉}
Surface gravity (log g)	2.70 cgs
Temperature	4,951±64 K
Metallicity [Fe/H]	−0.13±0.15 dex
Rotational velocity (v sin i)	2.60 km/s
Age	2.20 Gyr

Other designations
- Tiancang, θ Cet, 45 Cet, BD−08°244, FK5 47, HD 8512, HIP 6537, HR 402, SAO 129274

Database references
SIMBAD	data

Theta Ceti, also named Tiancang, is a solitary, orange-hued star in the equatorial constellation of Cetus. This star is visible to the naked eye with an apparent visual magnitude of 3.60. Based upon an annual parallax shift of 20.04 mas as seen from Earth, it is located about 112 light-years (34 pc) from the Sun. At that distance, the visual magnitude is diminished by an extinction factor of 0.28 due to interstellar dust. The star is drifting further away with a line of sight velocity component of +17 km/s.

== Nomenclature ==
Theta Ceti is a Bayer designation that is Latinized from θ Ceti, and abbreviated Theta Cet or θ Cet.

In the catalogue of stars in the Calendarium of Al Achsasi Al Mouakket, this star was designated Thanih al Naamat (ثاني النعامات - thānī al-naʽāmāt), which was translated into Latin as Secunda Struthionum, meaning the second ostrich. This star, along with η Cet (Gajahmina), τ Cet, ζ Cet (Baten Kaitos) and υ Cet (Alnaamaat), were Al Naʽāmāt (النعامات), the Hen Ostriches.

In Chinese astronomy, 天倉 (Tiān Cāng), meaning Square Celestial Granary, refers to an asterism consisting of θ Ceti, ι Ceti, η Ceti, ζ Ceti, τ Ceti and 57 Ceti. Consequently, the Chinese name for θ Ceti itself is 天倉三 (Tiān Cāng sān, English: the Third Star of Square Celestial Granary). The IAU Working Group on Star Names adopted the name Tiancang for θ Ceti on 15 October 2026.

== Properties ==
With an age of about 2.2 billion years, this is an evolved, K-type giant star with a stellar classification of K0 III. It is a red clump star on the horizontal branch, which means it is generating energy through helium fusion at its core. The star has an estimated 1.8 times the mass of the Sun and has expanded to 10 times the Sun's radius. It is radiating 58 times the solar luminosity from its photosphere at an effective temperature of 4,951 K.
