= List of stars in Cetus =

This is the list of notable stars in the constellation Cetus, sorted by decreasing brightness.

Name	B	F	G.	Var	HD	HIP	RA	Dec	vis. mag.	abs. mag.	Dist. (ly)	Sp. class	Notes
β Cet	β	16	70		4128	3419	00^{h} 43^{m} 35.23^{s}	−17° 59′ 12.1″	2.04	−0.30	96	K0III	Deneb Kaitos, Diphda, Difda al Thani, Rana Secunda; suspected variable
α Cet	α	92	310		18884	14135	03^{h} 02^{m} 16.78^{s}	+04° 05′ 23.7″	2.54	−1.61	220	M2III	Menkar, Menkab, Mekab, Monkar; irregular variable, V_{max} = 2.45^{m}, V_{min} = 2.54^{m}
Mira	ο	68	233		14386	10826	02^{h} 19^{m} 20.79^{s}	−02° 58′ 37.4″	3.04	−2.60	418	M5e-M9e	Mira Ceti, Collum Ceti; prototype of Mira variables, V_{max} = 2.0^{m}, V_{min} = 10.1^{m}, P = 331.96 d; has a white dwarf companion
η Cet	η	31	111		6805	5364	01^{h} 08^{m} 35.26^{s}	−10° 10′ 54.9″	3.46	0.67	118	K2III	Gajahmina, Deneb Algenubi, Dheneb, Deneb, Aoul al Naamat, Prima Struthionum, part of Al Naʽāmāt; spectroscopic binary, has a planet (b)
γ Cet	γ	86	291		16970	12706	02^{h} 43^{m} 18.12^{s}	+03° 14′ 10.2″	3.47	1.47	82	A3V	Kaffaljidhma; binary star
τ Cet	τ	52	177		10700	8102	01^{h} 44^{m} 05.13^{s}	−15° 56′ 22.4″	3.49	5.68	12	G8V	Thalath al Naamat, Tertia Struthionum, part of Al Naʽāmāt;, has five planets (b, c, d, e and f)
ι Cet	ι	8	33		1522	1562	00^{h} 19^{m} 25.68^{s}	−08° 49′ 25.8″	3.56	−1.18	290	K2III	Schemali, Deneb Kaitos Shemali; suspected variable
θ Cet	θ	45	136		8512	6537	01^{h} 24^{m} 01.45^{s}	−08° 10′ 57.9″	3.60	0.87	114	K0III	Tiancang, Thanih al Naamat, Secunda Struthionum, part of Al Naʽāmāt; spectroscopic binary
ζ Cet	ζ	55	185		11353	8645	01^{h} 51^{m} 27.61^{s}	−10° 20′ 05.8″	3.74	−0.76	259	K2III	Baten Kaitos, Rabah al Naamat, Quarta Struthionum, part of Al Naʽāmāt; spectroscopic binary; spectroscopic binary
υ Cet	υ	59	197		12274	9347	02^{h} 00^{m} 00.22^{s}	−21° 04′ 40.0″	3.99	−0.83	301	K5/M0III	Alnaamaat, part of Al Naʽāmāt; spectroscopic binary
δ Cet	δ	82	283		16582	12387	02^{h} 39^{m} 28.95^{s}	+00° 19′ 42.7″	4.08	−2.41	647	B2IV	Sawyqed, Al Kaff al Jidhmah III; β Cep variable, V_{max} = 4.05^{m}, V_{min} = 4.10^{m}, P = 0.161137 d
π Cet	π	89	296		17081	12770	02^{h} 44^{m} 07.35^{s}	−13° 51′ 31.2″	4.24	−1.41	441	B7IV	Al Sadr al Kaitos IV; Al Sadr al Ketus
μ Cet	μ	87	295		17094	12828	02^{h} 44^{m} 56.37^{s}	+10° 06′ 51.2″	4.27	2.21	84	F1III-IV	Al Kaff al Jidhmah IV; suspected variable
ξ^{2} Cet	ξ^{2}	73	251		15318	11484	02^{h} 28^{m} 09.52^{s}	+08° 27′ 36.3″	4.30	0.64	176	B9III	Al Kaff al Jidhmah II
ξ^{1} Cet	ξ^{1}	65	223		13611	10324	02^{h} 13^{m} 00.01^{s}	+08° 50′ 48.3″	4.36	−0.87	362	G8II:	Bawy, Al Kaff al Jidhmah I; suspected variable
7 Cet		7	25	AE	1038	1170	00^{h} 14^{m} 38.43^{s}	−18° 55′ 57.7″	4.44	−1.46	492	M1III	AE Cet; irregular variable, V_{max} = 4.26^{m}, V_{min} = 4.46^{m}
2 Cet		2	6		225132	301	00^{h} 03^{m} 44.37^{s}	−17° 20′ 09.5″	4.55	0.33	228	B9IVn	Hydor
χ Cet A	χ	53	182		11171	8497	01^{h} 49^{m} 35.19^{s}	−10° 41′ 10.3″	4.66	2.79	77	F3III	binary star
λ Cet	λ	91	308		18604	13954	02^{h} 59^{m} 42.90^{s}	+08° 54′ 26.6″	4.71	−0.86	424	B6III	Menkar
σ Cet	σ	76	261		15798	11783	02^{h} 32^{m} 05.28^{s}	−15° 14′ 39.6″	4.74	2.68	84	F5V	Al Sadr al Kaitos II
φ^{1} Cet	φ^{1}	17	72		4188	3455	00^{h} 44^{m} 11.41^{s}	−10° 36′ 33.4″	4.77	0.73	210	K0IIIvar	part of Al Nitham (φ Cet); suspected variable
20 Cet		20	89		5112	4147	00^{h} 53^{m} 00.49^{s}	−01° 08′ 39.2″	4.78	−1.23	519	M0III	Tianhun
ε Cet	ε	83	284		16620	12390	02^{h} 39^{m} 33.73^{s}	−11° 52′ 17.7″	4.83	2.67	88	F5V	Al Sadr al Kaitos III
κ^{1} Cet	κ^{1}	96	319		20630	15457	03^{h} 19^{m} 21.54^{s}	+03° 22′ 11.9″	4.84	5.03	30	G5Vvar	g^{1} Tauri; BY Dra variable, ΔV = 0.04^{m}
ν Cet	ν	78	270		16161	12093	02^{h} 35^{m} 52.49^{s}	+05° 35′ 35.9″	4.87	−0.42	372	G8III	double star
ρ Cet	ρ	72	247		15130	11345	02^{h} 25^{m} 57.01^{s}	−12° 17′ 25.6″	4.88	−1.17	528	A0V	Chugao, Al Sadr al Kaitos I
6 Cet		6	15		693	910	00^{h} 11^{m} 15.91^{s}	−15° 28′ 02.4″	4.89	3.51	62	F5V	
46 Cet		46	141		8705	6670	01^{h} 25^{m} 37.21^{s}	−14° 35′ 55.5″	4.90	0.17	288	K2III	
56 Cet		56	190		11930	9061	01^{h} 56^{m} 40.16^{s}	−22° 31′ 36.2″	4.92	−0.52	399	K3III	
175 G. Cet			175		10550	7999	01^{h} 42^{m} 43.52^{s}	−03° 41′ 24.4″	4.98	−2.86	1203	K3II-III	
3 Cet		3	8		225212	355	00^{h} 04^{m} 30.12^{s}	−10° 30′ 34.2″	4.99	−3.47	1606	K3Ibvar	suspected variable
94 Cet		94	316		19994	14954	03^{h} 12^{m} 46.32^{s}	−01° 11′ 45.4″	5.07	3.32	73	F8V	has a planet (b)
48 Cet		48	157		9132	6960	01^{h} 29^{m} 36.10^{s}	−21° 37′ 45.6″	5.11	0.95	221	A0V	double star
AD Cet			22		1014	1158	00^{h} 14^{m} 27.59^{s}	−07° 46′ 49.9″	5.13	−1.29	626	M3IIIvar	irregular variable, V_{max} = 4.90^{m}, V_{min} = 5.16^{m}
37 Cet		37	118		7439	5799	01^{h} 14^{m} 23.97^{s}	−07° 55′ 24.6″	5.14	3.20	79	F5V	suspected variable
49 G. Cet	ψ (Note: Labelled Psi Ceti (ψ Cet/ψ Ceti) by Bode in his Uranographia)		49		2696	2381	00^{h} 30^{m} 22.67^{s}	−23° 47′ 15.8″	5.17	1.46	180	A3V	
φ^{2} Cet	φ^{2}	19	84		4813	3909	00^{h} 50^{m} 07.72^{s}	−10° 38′ 37.6″	5.17	4.22	50	F7IV-V	part of Al Nitham (φ Cet)
13 Cet		13	54	BU	3196	2762	00^{h} 35^{m} 14.64^{s}	−03° 35′ 33.9″	5.20	3.58	69	F8V...	BU Cet; RS CVn variable, ΔV = ~0.10^{m}
73 G. Cet			73		4247	3505	00^{h} 44^{m} 44.44^{s}	−22° 00′ 22.8″	5.22	3.00	91	F0V	
259 G. Cet			259		15694	11738	02^{h} 31^{m} 30.08^{s}	+02° 16′ 01.9″	5.27	−0.55	476	K3III	
18 G. Cet			18		787	983	00^{h} 12^{m} 09.95^{s}	−17° 56′ 17.6″	5.29	−1.08	612	K4III	
69 Cet		69	236		14652	11021	02^{h} 21^{m} 56.64^{s}	+00° 23′ 44.5″	5.29	−2.73	1309	M2III	
φ^{3} Cet	φ^{3}	22	94		5437	4371	00^{h} 56^{m} 01.51^{s}	−11° 15′ 59.4″	5.35	−0.67	522	K4III	part of Al Nitham (φ Cet)
75 Cet		75	260		15779	11791	02^{h} 32^{m} 09.44^{s}	−01° 02′ 05.3″	5.36	0.80	266	G3III:	has a planet (b)
179 G. Cet			179		10824	8230	01^{h} 45^{m} 59.27^{s}	−05° 43′ 59.6″	5.37	−0.60	509	K4III	
25 Cet		25	102		6203	4914	01^{h} 03^{m} 02.60^{s}	−04° 50′ 10.9″	5.40	−0.10	410	K0III-IV	
50 Cet		50	169		9856	7450	01^{h} 35^{m} 58.96^{s}	−15° 24′ 00.8″	5.41	−0.72	549	K1III	
39 Cet		39	121	AY	7672	5951	01^{h} 16^{m} 36.35^{s}	−02° 30′ 00.8″	5.42	0.95	256	G5III-IVe	AY Cet; RS CVn variable, V_{max} = 5.35^{m}, V_{min} = 5.58^{m}; spectroscopic binary
60 Cet		60	201		12573	9589	02^{h} 03^{m} 11.61^{s}	+00° 07′ 42.4″	5.42	0.69	288	A5III	
70 Cet		70	237		14690	11046	02^{h} 22^{m} 12.41^{s}	−00° 53′ 05.1″	5.42	0.76	279	F0Vn	
57 Cet		57	196		12255	9326	01^{h} 59^{m} 46.19^{s}	−20° 49′ 28.5″	5.43	−1.13	668	M0/M1III	
AR Cet			198	AR	12292	9372	02^{h} 00^{m} 26.77^{s}	−08° 31′ 25.8″	5.43	−0.87	593	M3III	semiregular variable, V_{max} = 5.40^{m}, V_{min} = 5.61^{m}
238 G. Cet			238		14691	11029	02^{h} 22^{m} 01.44^{s}	−10° 46′ 38.4″	5.43	3.05	97	F0V	
88 G. Cet			88		5098	4104	00^{h} 52^{m} 40.60^{s}	−24° 00′ 21.3″	5.47	−0.46	500	K1III	
77 G. Cet			77		4398	3607	00^{h} 46^{m} 11.63^{s}	−22° 31′ 19.4″	5.49	0.44	333	G8/K0III	
47 Cet		47	145		8829	6748	01^{h} 26^{m} 51.56^{s}	−13° 03′ 23.5″	5.51	2.71	118	F0V	
67 Cet		67	231		14129	10642	02^{h} 16^{m} 58.99^{s}	−06° 25′ 18.7″	5.51	0.42	340	G8III	
80 Cet		80	271		16212	12107	02^{h} 36^{m} 00.07^{s}	−07° 49′ 53.2″	5.53	−0.47	517	M0III	
EL Cet			315	EL	19926	14915	03^{h} 12^{m} 26.37^{s}	+06° 39′ 39.2″	5.55	−1.34	780	K1IIIpe+...	irregular variable, ΔV = 0.04^{m}; multiple star
59 G. Cet			59		3443	2941	00^{h} 37^{m} 19.79^{s}	−24° 46′ 02.0″	5.57	4.61	51	K1V+...	
79 G. Cet			79		4622	3741	00^{h} 48^{m} 01.05^{s}	−21° 43′ 20.9″	5.57	−0.29	485	B9V	
28 Cet		28	105		6530	5164	01^{h} 06^{m} 05.13^{s}	−09° 50′ 21.7″	5.58	−0.73	595	A1V	
172 G. Cet			172		10148	7679	01^{h} 38^{m} 51.71^{s}	−21° 16′ 31.7″	5.58	1.34	229	F0V	
81 G. Cet			81		4730	3849	00^{h} 49^{m} 25.55^{s}	−13° 33′ 39.7″	5.59	0.59	325	K3III	
232 G. Cet			232		14214	10723	02^{h} 18^{m} 01.23^{s}	+01° 45′ 24.8″	5.60	3.61	81	G0.5IV	
T Cet			36	T	1760	1728	00^{h} 21^{m} 46.23^{s}	−20° 03′ 28.8″	5.61	−1.27	774	M5/M6Ib/II	semiregular variable, V_{max} = 5.0^{m}, V_{min} = 6.9^{m}, P = 158.9 d
203 G. Cet			203		12642	9622	02^{h} 03^{m} 40.48^{s}	−04° 06′ 12.1″	5.61	−0.90	655	K5Iab:	
φ^{4} Cet	φ^{4}	23	99		5722	4587	00^{h} 58^{m} 43.89^{s}	−11° 22′ 47.8″	5.62	0.69	315	G7III	part of Al Nitham (φ Cet)
49 Cet		49	167		9672	7345	01^{h} 34^{m} 37.72^{s}	−15° 40′ 34.9″	5.62	1.68	200	A1V	
93 Cet		93	311		18883	14143	03^{h} 02^{m} 22.51^{s}	+04° 21′ 10.3″	5.62	−0.06	445	B7V	
95 Cet		95	318		20559	15383	03^{h} 18^{m} 22.28^{s}	−00° 55′ 48.5″	5.62	1.45	222	K1IV	
64 Cet		64	215		13421	10212	02^{h} 11^{m} 21.16^{s}	+08° 34′ 12.3″	5.64	2.50	139	G0IV	
66 Cet		66	224		13612	10305	02^{h} 12^{m} 47.32^{s}	−02° 23′ 36.5″	5.65	2.33	150	F8V	
81 Cet		81	277		16400	12247	02^{h} 37^{m} 41.78^{s}	−03° 23′ 45.8″	5.65	0.71	317	G5III:	has a planet (b)
78 G. Cet			78		4585	3717	00^{h} 47^{m} 43.20^{s}	−18° 03′ 41.1″	5.70	0.25	402	K3III	
38 Cet		38	119		7476	5833	01^{h} 14^{m} 49.18^{s}	−00° 58′ 27.5″	5.70	2.49	143	F5V	
κ^{2} Cet	κ^{2}	97	321		20791	15619	03^{h} 21^{m} 06.77^{s}	+03° 40′ 32.5″	5.70	0.95	290	G8.5III	g^{2} Tauri
30 Cet		30	109		6706	5296	01^{h} 07^{m} 46.12^{s}	−09° 47′ 08.1″	5.71	2.32	155	F7IV	
12 Cet		12	48		2637	2353	00^{h} 30^{m} 02.35^{s}	−03° 57′ 26.3″	5.72	−1.37	853	M0III	
84 Cet		84	288		16765	12530	02^{h} 41^{m} 13.87^{s}	−00° 41′ 43.3″	5.72	4.05	71	F7IV	
77 Cet		77	265		16074	12002	02^{h} 34^{m} 42.59^{s}	−07° 51′ 33.4″	5.74	−0.39	549	K4III	
165 G. Cet			165		9562	7276	01^{h} 33^{m} 42.73^{s}	−07° 01′ 30.5″	5.75	3.39	97	G2IV	
174 G. Cet			174		10453	7916	01^{h} 41^{m} 44.80^{s}	−11° 19′ 25.2″	5.75	2.89	122	F5V+...	
27 G. Cet			27		1064	1191	00^{h} 14^{m} 54.50^{s}	−09° 34′ 10.4″	5.77	0.64	347	B9V	
7 G. Cet			7		225197	343	00^{h} 04^{m} 19.76^{s}	−16° 31′ 44.0″	5.78	1.04	289	K0III	
BK Cet			188	BK	11522	8778	01^{h} 52^{m} 52.09^{s}	−16° 55′ 44.8″	5.78	0.75	330	F0V	δ Sct variable, V_{max} = 5.73^{m}, V_{min} = 5.81^{m}
268 G. Cet			268		16160	12114	02^{h} 36^{m} 03.83^{s}	+06° 53′ 00.1″	5.79	6.50	24	K3V	
286 G. Cet			286		16673	12444	02^{h} 40^{m} 12.50^{s}	−09° 27′ 09.7″	5.79	4.12	70	F6V	
272 G. Cet			272		16247	12148	02^{h} 36^{m} 35.10^{s}	+07° 43′ 48.3″	5.81	1.05	292	K0III:	
14 G. Cet			14		645	873	00^{h} 10^{m} 42.75^{s}	−12° 34′ 47.3″	5.84	1.77	212	K0III	
226 G. Cet			226		13692	10326	02^{h} 13^{m} 00.95^{s}	−21° 00′ 00.9″	5.86	0.42	399	K0III	
42 Cet		42	124		8036	6226	01^{h} 19^{m} 48.29^{s}	−00° 30′ 32.4″	5.87	0.46	394	A7V...	
202 G. Cet			202		12583	9572	02^{h} 02^{m} 58.55^{s}	−15° 18′ 21.4″	5.87	0.85	329	K0II/III	
93 G. Cet			93		5384	4346	00^{h} 55^{m} 42.40^{s}	−07° 20′ 49.3″	5.88	−0.04	498	K5III	
AB Cet			248	AB	15144	11348	02^{h} 26^{m} 00.38^{s}	−15° 20′ 28.0″	5.88	1.79	214	Ap SrCrEu	α² CVn variable, V_{max} = 5.71^{m}, V_{min} = 5.88^{m}, P = 2.99781 d
239 G. Cet			239		14728	11033	02^{h} 22^{m} 04.98^{s}	−17° 39′ 43.3″	5.89	−0.06	504	K2III	
250 G. Cet			250		15220	11381	02^{h} 26^{m} 35.16^{s}	−20° 02′ 34.3″	5.89	1.19	284	K2III	
65 G. Cet			65		3807	3193	00^{h} 40^{m} 42.38^{s}	−04° 21′ 06.5″	5.90	−0.34	576	K0III	
HD 4732			80		4732	3834	00^{h} 49^{m} 13.90^{s}	−24° 08′ 11.5″	5.90	2.14	184	K0III	has two planets (b and c)
137 G. Cet			137		8556	6564	01^{h} 24^{m} 20.48^{s}	−06° 54′ 52.8″	5.92	2.66	146	F4V	
11 G. Cet			11		319	636	00^{h} 07^{m} 46.86^{s}	−22° 30′ 30.5″	5.93	1.41	262	A1V	
34 Cet		34	114		7147	5594	01^{h} 11^{m} 43.54^{s}	−02° 15′ 03.7″	5.93	0.28	441	K4III	
14 Cet		14	55		3229	2787	00^{h} 35^{m} 32.75^{s}	−00° 30′ 19.7″	5.94	2.21	181	F5IV	
63 Cet		63	218		13468	10234	02^{h} 11^{m} 35.84^{s}	−01° 49′ 31.3″	5.94	0.76	354	G9III:	
61 Cet		61	204		12641	9631	02^{h} 03^{m} 48.12^{s}	−00° 20′ 24.5″	5.96	0.94	330	G5V...	
33 Cet		33	113		7014	5510	01^{h} 10^{m} 33.56^{s}	+02° 26′ 44.6″	5.97	−1.23	898	K4III	
HD 18262			305		18262	13679	02^{h} 56^{m} 13.73^{s}	+08° 22′ 54.4″	5.97	2.73	145	F7IV	
290 G. Cet			290		16825	12562	02^{h} 41^{m} 34.13^{s}	−14° 32′ 57.9″	5.98	2.52	161	F5V	
12 G. Cet			12		360	671	00^{h} 08^{m} 17.55^{s}	−08° 49′ 26.5″	5.99	0.94	333	G8III:	
219 G. Cet			219		13456	10215	02^{h} 11^{m} 22.24^{s}	−10° 03′ 06.3″	6.00	2.51	163	F5V	
256 G. Cet			256		15633	11687	02^{h} 30^{m} 45.23^{s}	+00° 15′ 21.2″	6.00	1.37	275	A7III-IVs	
71 G. Cet			71		4145	3436	00^{h} 43^{m} 50.09^{s}	−12° 00′ 40.7″	6.01	2.38	174	K1III	
189 G. Cet			189		11803	8998	01^{h} 55^{m} 53.74^{s}	+01° 50′ 58.3″	6.01	3.06	127	F7V+...	
297 G. Cet			297		17163	12862	02^{h} 45^{m} 20.87^{s}	+04° 42′ 42.2″	6.04	2.49	167	F0III:	
313 G. Cet			313		19121	14315	03^{h} 04^{m} 38.05^{s}	+01° 51′ 49.0″	6.05	0.97	338	K0III	
BG Cet			58	BG	3326	2852	00^{h} 36^{m} 06.90^{s}	−22° 50′ 32.0″	6.06	2.58	162	A5m...	δ Sct variable, ΔV = ~0.009^{m}
26 Cet		26	103		6288	4979	01^{h} 03^{m} 48.96^{s}	+01° 22′ 01.0″	6.06	2.29	185	F1V	
213 G. Cet			213		13215	9999	02^{h} 08^{m} 45.67^{s}	−17° 46′ 44.8″	6.07	−1.93	1299	M1III	
289 G. Cet			289		16824	12584	02^{h} 41^{m} 48.33^{s}	−03° 12′ 49.6″	6.07	−0.67	726	G9III:	
27 Cet		27	104		6482	5121	01^{h} 05^{m} 36.90^{s}	−09° 58′ 45.3″	6.09	1.21	308	K0III	
254 G. Cet			254		15453	11603	02^{h} 29^{m} 35.36^{s}	+09° 33′ 56.2″	6.09	1.37	286	K2III	
CF Cet			13	CF	402	696	00^{h} 08^{m} 33.49^{s}	−17° 34′ 40.9″	6.11	−1.97	1347	M0/M1IIICNp	semiregular variable, ΔV = ~0.16^{m}
106 G. Cet			106		6559	5170	01^{h} 06^{m} 07.73^{s}	−23° 59′ 32.5″	6.12	0.96	350	K1III	
149 G. Cet			149		8921	6822	01^{h} 27^{m} 46.44^{s}	−10° 54′ 05.8″	6.13	0.94	356	K0	
64 G. Cet			64		3795	3185	00^{h} 40^{m} 32.40^{s}	−23° 48′ 14.4″	6.14	3.86	93	G3/G5V	
47 G. Cet			47		2630	2337	00^{h} 29^{m} 51.81^{s}	−14° 51′ 50.5″	6.15	3.02	138	F2/F3V	
74 G. Cet			74		4301	3552	00^{h} 45^{m} 24.10^{s}	−04° 37′ 45.3″	6.15	−1.52	1113	M0III	
18 Cet		18	75		4307	3559	00^{h} 45^{m} 28.71^{s}	−12° 52′ 49.1″	6.15	3.63	104	G2V	
21 Cet		21	92		5268	4257	00^{h} 54^{m} 17.58^{s}	−08° 44′ 26.0″	6.15	0.82	379	G5IV	
EH Cet			306	EH	18345	13756	02^{h} 57^{m} 04.56^{s}	+04° 30′ 03.5″	6.15	−0.01	556	M4III	semiregular variable, V_{max} = 6.05^{m}, V_{min} = 6.22^{m}
10 Cet		10	40		2273	2100	00^{h} 26^{m} 37.37^{s}	−00° 02′ 58.3″	6.16	0.29	486	G8III	
128 G. Cet			128		8121	6272	01^{h} 20^{m} 27.84^{s}	−11° 14′ 19.7″	6.16	0.81	382	K1III	
139 G. Cet			139		8589	6589	01^{h} 24^{m} 39.91^{s}	−15° 39′ 37.5″	6.17	1.12	334	G8III/IV	
138 G. Cet			138		8599	6605	01^{h} 24^{m} 48.67^{s}	−02° 50′ 54.7″	6.17	1.60	268	G8III	
258 G. Cet			258		15652	11671	02^{h} 30^{m} 32.79^{s}	−22° 32′ 42.9″	6.17	0.48	448	M0III	
264 G. Cet			264		16060	12022	02^{h} 35^{m} 04.14^{s}	+07° 28′ 16.7″	6.17	0.82	383	G6III:	
9 G. Cet			9		203	560	00^{h} 06^{m} 50.02^{s}	−23° 06′ 26.7″	6.19	3.23	127	F2IV	
263 G. Cet			263		15996	11907	02^{h} 33^{m} 40.25^{s}	−20° 00′ 06.2″	6.19	0.94	365	K1III	
10 G. Cet			10		256	602	00^{h} 07^{m} 18.27^{s}	−17° 23′ 13.3″	6.20	0.18	522	A2IV/V	
176 G. Cet			176		10658	8094	01^{h} 43^{m} 54.81^{s}	−04° 45′ 55.6″	6.20	−0.51	716	K0	
131 G. Cet			131		8334	6432	01^{h} 22^{m} 36.91^{s}	+01° 43′ 35.2″	6.21	−0.84	838	M0III	
44 Cet		44	135	AV	8511	6539	01^{h} 24^{m} 02.43^{s}	−08° 00′ 26.1″	6.21	2.07	220	F0V	AV Cet; δ Sct variable, V_{max} = 6.20^{m}, V_{min} = 6.22^{m}, P = 0.07 d
279 G. Cet			279		16467	12318	02^{h} 38^{m} 36.78^{s}	+03° 26′ 35.5″	6.21	0.57	437	G9III	
240 G. Cet			240		14830	11108	02^{h} 22^{m} 57.55^{s}	−18° 21′ 16.8″	6.22	0.84	388	G8/K0III	
39 G. Cet			39		2268	2086	00^{h} 26^{m} 21.74^{s}	−18° 41′ 37.0″	6.24	−0.59	758	M1III	
170 G. Cet			170		10009	7580	01^{h} 37^{m} 37.56^{s}	−09° 24′ 14.6″	6.24	3.33	125	F7V	
309 G. Cet			309		18832	14104	03^{h} 01^{m} 52.28^{s}	+05° 20′ 10.0″	6.24	0.34	492	K0	
4 G. Cet			4		225045	238	00^{h} 02^{m} 57.43^{s}	−20° 02′ 45.9″	6.25	2.29	202	F6/F7V	
127 G. Cet			127		8120	6283	01^{h} 20^{m} 34.57^{s}	−03° 14′ 49.2″	6.26	0.21	528	K1III	
285 G. Cet			284		16647	12447	02^{h} 40^{m} 15.66^{s}	+06° 06′ 43.0″	6.26	3.27	129	F3V:	
82 G. Cet			82		4772	3858	00^{h} 49^{m} 33.44^{s}	−23° 21′ 43.6″	6.27	−0.83	858	A3IV	
314 G. Cet			314		19525	14607	03^{h} 08^{m} 38.79^{s}	+08° 28′ 15.2″	6.28	0.50	468	G9III	
1 Cet		1	3		224481	118178	23^{h} 58^{m} 21.17^{s}	−15° 50′ 50.9″	6.28	0.41	486	K1IIICN...	
207 G. Cet			207		12923	9827	02^{h} 06^{m} 29.27^{s}	+00° 02′ 07.3″	6.29	0.17	545	K0	
1 G. Cet			1		224283	118029	23^{h} 56^{m} 29.94^{s}	−24° 44′ 14.1″	6.31	0.37	502	G8III/IV	
71 Cet		71	245	FR	15004	11261	02^{h} 24^{m} 58.39^{s}	−02° 46′ 48.1″	6.34	−0.14	646	A0III	FR Cet
133 G. Cet			133		8350	6427	01^{h} 22^{m} 30.52^{s}	−19° 04′ 51.8″	6.35	2.48	194	F5/F6V	
108 G. Cet			108		6668	5259	01^{h} 07^{m} 12.88^{s}	−23° 59′ 46.5″	6.36	2.08	234	A3III	
9 Cet		9	37	BE	1835	1803	00^{h} 22^{m} 51.55^{s}	−12° 12′ 34.5″	6.39	4.84	66	G3V	BE Cet; BY Dra variable, V_{max} = 6.38^{m}, V_{min} = 6.43^{m}
209 G. Cet			209		13004	9862	02^{h} 06^{m} 51.96^{s}	−19° 08′ 19.6″	6.39	1.79	271	K1III	
32 Cet		32	112		6976	5485	01^{h} 10^{m} 11.96^{s}	−08° 54′ 21.7″	6.40	1.16	365	K0III	
276 G. Cet			276		16399	12272	02^{h} 38^{m} 00.70^{s}	+07° 41′ 43.4″	6.40	1.82	269	F6IV	
168 G. Cet			168		9731	7363	01^{h} 34^{m} 51.55^{s}	−23° 41′ 59.0″	6.41	−1.00	991	K2III	
144 G. Cet			144		8779	6717	01^{h} 26^{m} 27.32^{s}	−00° 23′ 56.3″	6.42	−0.22	694	K0IV	
186 G. Cet			186		11365	8664	01^{h} 51^{m} 37.80^{s}	−06° 52′ 26.8″	6.42	0.31	542	K0	
HD 11964			191		11964	9094	01^{h} 57^{m} 09.82^{s}	−10° 14′ 30.6″	6.42	3.76	111	G5IV	has two planets (b and c)
38 G. Cet			38		1879	1821	00^{h} 23^{m} 04.35^{s}	−15° 56′ 33.4″	6.43	−1.02	1009	M0III	
148 G. Cet			148		8896	6789	01^{h} 27^{m} 23.31^{s}	−22° 20′ 16.9″	6.43	1.06	387	K0/K1III	
171 G. Cet			171		10024	7597	01^{h} 37^{m} 52.05^{s}	−03° 26′ 26.3″	6.43	−0.76	896	K5	
205 G. Cet			205		12702	9655	02^{h} 04^{m} 12.44^{s}	−11° 51′ 35.1″	6.43	−1.11	1052	K4III	
227 G. Cet			227		13763	10396	02^{h} 13^{m} 53.55^{s}	−09° 03′ 52.8″	6.43	−1.50	1259	K0	
43 G. Cet			43		2475	2237	00^{h} 28^{m} 21.17^{s}	−20° 20′ 05.2″	6.44	3.90	105	G3V	
90 G. Cet			90		5156	4164	00^{h} 53^{m} 12.39^{s}	−24° 46′ 37.1″	6.44	2.08	243	F3V	
29 Cet		29	110		6734	5315	01^{h} 07^{m} 59.58^{s}	+01° 59′ 38.7″	6.44	3.11	151	K0IV	
166 G. Cet			166		9690	7362	01^{h} 34^{m} 51.31^{s}	−03° 31′ 25.7″	6.44	−0.56	819	K0	
187 G. Cet			187		11396	8688	01^{h} 51^{m} 46.09^{s}	−15° 38′ 50.9″	6.44	−0.52	805	M2III	
57 G. Cet			57		3325	2846	00^{h} 36^{m} 03.20^{s}	−14° 58′ 22.4″	6.45	0.68	464	K0III	
178 G. Cet			178		10725	8143	01^{h} 44^{m} 43.67^{s}	−06° 45′ 58.2″	6.45	0.37	535	G0	
25 Ari		(25)	249		15228	11427	02^{h} 27^{m} 23.56^{s}	+10° 11′ 55.7″	6.45	3.65	119	F5V	249 G. Cet
252 G. Cet			252		15328	11474	02^{h} 27^{m} 59.93^{s}	+01° 57′ 39.2″	6.45	−0.87	950	K0III	
2 G. Cet			2		224349	118081	23^{h} 57^{m} 10.14^{s}	−20° 50′ 01.0″	6.45	0.72	456	G8/K0III	
5 G. Cet			5		225069	253	00^{h} 03^{m} 07.82^{s}	−24° 08′ 42.5″	6.46	0.62	481	K1III	
29 G. Cet			29		1343	1402	00^{h} 17^{m} 32.69^{s}	−19° 03′ 03.9″	6.46	3.02	159	F3V	
193 G. Cet			193		12116	9237	01^{h} 58^{m} 45.95^{s}	−11° 18′ 02.7″	6.46	0.97	409	G5	
HD 1461			32		1461	1499	00^{h} 18^{m} 41.62^{s}	−08° 03′ 09.5″	6.47	4.62	76	G0V	has two exoplanets (b & c) and two candidates (d & e)
76 G. Cet			76		4338	3576	00^{h} 45^{m} 41.70^{s}	−16° 25′ 27.1″	6.47	1.75	286	F0IV	
101 G. Cet			101		6037	4801	01^{h} 01^{m} 38.60^{s}	−16° 15′ 55.3″	6.47	1.82	277	K2/K3III	
293 G. Cet			293		17001	12720	02^{h} 43^{m} 28.90^{s}	−02° 31′ 53.4″	6.48	0.66	475	K0	
63 G. Cet			63		3794	3175	00^{h} 40^{m} 28.56^{s}	−16° 30′ 59.8″	6.49	0.55	503	G8III	
221 G. Cet			221		13546	10273	02^{h} 12^{m} 15.76^{s}	+02° 44′ 43.9″	6.49	0.56	499	G5	
28 G. Cet			28		1256	1331	00^{h} 16^{m} 42.35^{s}	−20° 12′ 36.2″	6.50	0.13	612	B6III/IV	
43 Cet		43	132		8335	6429	01^{h} 22^{m} 34.82^{s}	−00° 26′ 58.7″	6.50	0.39	544	K0III:	
142 G. Cet			142		8713	6687	01^{h} 25^{m} 52.33^{s}	−03° 55′ 38.4″	6.50	1.47	330	K0	
234 G. Cet			234		14417	10854	02^{h} 19^{m} 40.76^{s}	−04° 20′ 44.1″	6.50	0.38	545	A3V	
225 G. Cet	ω (Note: Labelled Omega Ceti (ω Cet/ω Ceti) by Bode in his Uranographia)		225		13683	10356	02^{h} 13^{m} 29.73^{s}	+05° 00′ 46.2″	6.51		206	F0	
40 Cet		40	122		7727	5985	01^{h} 16^{m} 58.86^{s}	−02° 16′ 43.7″	6.52	4.16	97	F8	
58 Cet		58	192		12020	9165	01^{h} 57^{m} 59.39^{s}	−02° 03′ 34.2″	6.52	0.63	491	A0	
35 Cet		35	115		7218	5646	01^{h} 12^{m} 30.75^{s}	+02° 28′ 18.6″	6.55	2.96	170	F8	
15 Cet		15	60		3512	2994	00^{h} 38^{m} 04.57^{s}	−00° 30′ 12.6″	6.64	−0.11	731	K2III	
χ Cet B	χ	53		EZ	11131	8486	01^{h} 49^{m} 23.36^{s}	−10° 42′ 12.8″	6.74	4.91	74.94	G0	EZ Ceti; component of the χ Cet system; BY Dra variable, ΔV = 0.05^{m}, P = 8.92 d
79 Cet		79	267		16141	12048	02^{h} 35^{m} 20.02^{s}	−03° 33′ 34.3″	6.83	4.05	117	G5IV	has a planet (b)
HD 4747					4747	3850	00^{h} 49^{m} 26.8^{s}	−23° 12′ 45″	7.15		61	G9V	has a planet (b)
HD 984					984	1134	00^{h} 14^{m} 10.25^{s}	−07° 11′ 56.82″	7.32	3.95	149	F7V	Has a brown dwarf companion
HD 7449					7449	5806	01^{h} 14^{m} 29^{s}	−05° 02′ 51″	7.50		127	F8V	has two planets (b & c)
HD 11506					11506	8770	01^{h} 52^{m} 50.53^{s}	−19° 30′ 25.1″	7.54	3.89	176	G0V	has two planets (b & c)
HD 5319					5319	4297	00^{h} 55^{m} 01.40^{s}	+00° 47′ 22.4″	8.05	3.05	326	K0III	has two planets (b & c)
HD 12039				DK	12039	9141	01^{h} 57^{m} 48.98^{s}	−21° 54′ 05.3″	8.11	4.98	138	G4V	DK Cet; BY Dra variable, ΔV = ~0.12^{m}; has a debris disk
HD 1666					1666	1666	00^{h} 20^{m} 52.0^{s}	−19° 55′ 52″	8.17		361	F7V	has a planet (b)
HD 224693					224693	118319	23^{h} 59^{m} 53.83^{s}	−22° 25′ 41.2″	8.23	3.36	306	G2IV	Axólotl, has a planet (b)
HD 9174					9174	6993	01^{h} 30^{m} 01.0^{s}	−19° 36′ 16″	8.4		257	G8IV	has a planet (b)
HD 6718					6718	5301	01^{h} 07^{m} 48.66^{s}	−08° 14′ 01.3″	8.45	4.75	179	G0	has a planet (b)
58 Cet		58			12021	9155	01^{h} 57^{m} 56.14^{s}	−02° 05′ 57.7″	8.89	0.54	1523	A0	
HD 1690					1690	1692	00^{h} 21^{m} 13^{s}	−08° 16′ 32″	9.17		1040	K1III	has a planet (b)
HD 2638					2638	2350	00^{h} 29^{m} 59.87^{s}	−05° 45′ 50.4″	9.44	5.79	175	G5	has a planet (b)
BD-17°63						2247	00^{h} 28^{m} 34.31^{s}	−16° 13′ 34.8″	9.63	6.87	116	K5V	Felixvarela, has a planet (b)
HD 16031					16031	11952	02^{h} 34^{m} 11^{s}	−12° 23′ 03″	9.76		362	F2V	has two planets (b and c)
WASP-136							00^{h} 01^{m} 18.2^{s}	−08° 55′ 35″	9.98		898		has a transiting planet (b)
HIP 5158						5158	01^{h} 06^{m} 02.05^{s}	−22° 27′ 11.4″	10.21	6.95	146	K5	has two planets (b and c)
HIP 11915					16008	11915	02^{h} 33^{m} 49.025^{s}	−19° 36′ 42.5032″	8.58	4.81	185	G5V	
WASP-71							01^{h} 57^{m} 03.0^{s}	+00° 45′ 32″	10.57		652	F8	Mpingo, has a transiting planet (b)
WASP-20							00^{h} 20^{m} 38.54^{s}	−23° 56′ 08.6″	10.68		685		has a transiting planet (b)
WASP-137							01^{h} 43^{m} 29.0^{s}	−14° 08′ 57″	11		801	G0	has a transiting planet (b)
WASP-77A							02^{h} 28^{m} 37.0^{s}	−07° 03′ 38″	11.29			G8V	has a transiting planet (b)
WASP-26							00^{h} 18^{m} 24.70^{s}	−15° 16′ 02.3″	11.30	4.30	820	G0	has a transiting planet (b)
WASP-156							02^{h} 11^{m} 07.6^{s}	+02° 25′ 05″	11.60		457	K3	has a planet (b)
BD -16°251							01^{h} 29^{m} 30.31^{s}	−16° 08′ 05.51″	11.7		13000		Cayrel's Star
WASP-138							02^{h} 46^{m} 33.4^{s}	−00° 27′ 50″	11.81		1005	F9	has a transiting planet (b)
YZ Cet				YZ		5643	01^{h} 12^{m} 30.64^{s}	−16° 59′ 56.3″	12.07	14.25	11.74	M4.5V	21st nearest star system; flare star, has three planets (b, c & d)
WASP-158							00^{h} 16^{m} 35.0^{s}	−10° 58′ 35″	12.1			F6V	has a transiting planet (b)
UV Cet				UV			01^{h} 39^{m} 01.54^{s}	−17° 57′ 01.8″	12.54	15.40	8.73	M5.5Ve	primary component of Luyten 726-8, the 6th nearest star system; prototype of UV Cet variables (flare stars), V_{max} = 6.80^{m}, V_{min} = 12.95^{m}
WASP-44							00^{h} 15^{m} 36.77^{s}	−11° 56′ 17.3″	12.90			G8V	has a transiting planet (b)
BL Cet				BL			01^{h} 39^{m} 01.54^{s}	−17° 57′ 01.8″	12.99	15.85	8.73	M6.0Ve	secondary component of Luyten 726-8; flare star
Table legend: Name = Proper name; B = Bayer designation; F or/and G. = Flamsteed designation or Gould designation; Var = Variable-star designation; HD = Henry Draper Catalogue designation number; HIP = Hipparcos Catalogue designation number; RA = Right ascension for the Epoch/Equinox J2000.0; Dec = Declination for the Epoch/Equinox J2000.0; vis. mag. = visual magnitude (m or m_{v}), also known as apparent magnitude; abs. mag. = absolute magnitude (M_{v}); Dist. (ly) = Distance in light-years from Earth; Sp. class = Spectral class of the star in the stellar classification system; Notes = Common name(s) or alternate name(s); comments; notable properties [for example: multiple star status, range of variability if it is a variable star, exoplanets, etc.]

== See also ==
- List of stars by constellation
