= Phi Ceti =

The Bayer designation Phi Ceti (φ Cet / φ Ceti) is shared by four stars, in the constellation Cetus:

- φ^{1} Ceti (HR 194), a red clump giant
- φ^{2} Ceti (HR 235), an F7 main sequence star
- φ^{3} Ceti (HR 267), a red giant
- φ^{4} Ceti (HR 279), a G8 giant

All of them were the Arabs' Al Nithām. According to the catalogue of stars in the Technical Memorandum 33-507 - A Reduced Star Catalog Containing 537 Named Stars, Al Nitham were the title for four stars :φ^{1} Ceti as Al Nitham I, φ^{2} Ceti as Al Nitham II, φ^{3} Ceti as Al Nitham III and φ^{4} Ceti as Al Nitham IV.

φ^{1} Ceti and φ^{3} Ceti were member of asterism 天溷 (Tiān Hùn), Celestial Pigsty, Legs mansion.
