= HD 170469 =

Star in the constellation Ophiuchus

Observation data Epoch J2000 Equinox ICRS
- Constellation: Ophiuchus
- Right ascension: 18^{h} 29^{m} 10.98109^{s}
- Declination: +11° 41′ 43.8033″
- Apparent magnitude (V): 8.21

Characteristics
- Evolutionary stage: subgiant + main sequence
- Spectral type: G5IV + K5V
- B−V color index: 0.677±0.014

Astrometry
Radial velocity (R_{v})	−59.32±0.10 km/s
Proper motion (μ)	RA: −48.277 mas/yr Dec.: −17.791 mas/yr
Parallax (π)	16.5732±0.0231 mas
Distance	196.8 ± 0.3 ly (60.34 ± 0.08 pc)
Absolute magnitude (M_{V})	4.23

Orbit
Period (P)	114000 yr
Semi-major axis (a)	43.1″

Details

A
Mass	1.10 M_{☉}
Radius	1.24 R_{☉}
Luminosity	1.639±0.006 L_{☉}
Surface gravity (log g)	4.30±0.03 cgs
Temperature	5,786±28 K
Metallicity [Fe/H]	0.28±0.02 dex
Rotation	30.46±0.16 or 33.14±0.24 d
Age	4.8+3.0 −0.5 or 8.6±0.5 Gyr

B
Mass	0.42 M_{☉}

Other designations
- BD+11°3479, HD 170469, HIP 90593, SAO 103765, 2MASS J18291097+1141437

Database references
SIMBAD	data
Exoplanet Archive	data

HD 170469 is a probable binary star system in the equatorial constellation of Ophiuchus. It is too faint to be viewed with the naked eye, having an apparent visual magnitude of 8.21. The system is located at a distance of 197 light-years away from the Sun based on parallax. It is drifting closer with a radial velocity of −59 km/s, and is expected to come to within 49.8 light-years in about 959,000 years.

The primary, component A, is a G-type subgiant with a stellar classification of G5IV, indicating it is generating energy through core hydrogen fusion. Estimates of the star's age range from five to almost nine billion years. It has 1.10 times the mass of the Sun and 1.24 times the Sun's radius. The star has a higher than solar metallicity. It is radiating 1.64 times the Sun's luminosity from its photosphere at an effective temperature of 5,786 K.

The secondary companion, component B, is located at an angular separation of 43.21″±0.10″ along a position angle of 112.55°±0.07° from the primary, as of 2018. Initially it was thought to be a red dwarf of spectral class M1, but was later determined to be a K-type main-sequence star with a class of K5V. This star lies at a projected separation of 2708 AU from the primary, and is orbiting with an estimated period of around 114,000 years.

== Planetary system ==
In 2007, a gas giant exoplanet was discovered around the primary star by the N2K Consortium, led by principal investigators Debra Fischer and Gregory P. Laughlin. It was spotted using the radial velocity method, and was independently confirmed in 2014. Its minimum mass is a third that of Jupiter, and it orbits at just over twice Earth's distance from the Sun, taking three Earth years to complete an orbit.

A 2026 study using HARPS-N found weak evidence for a potential candidate second planet, which would be a hot Neptune orbiting with an 8-day period.

The HD 170469 planetary system
Companion (in order from star)	Mass	Semimajor axis (AU)	Orbital period (days)	Eccentricity	Inclination (°)	Radius
.01 (unconfirmed)	≥13.8±3.2 M_{🜨}	—	8.2676±0.0015	0.19+0.26 −0.13	—	—
b	≥0.67 M_{J}	2.1	1,145±18	0.11±0.08	—	—

== See also ==
- HD 125612
- HD 231701
- HD 17156
- HD 11506
- List of extrasolar planets
