= HD 125612 =

Binary star system in the constellation Virgo

Observation data Epoch J2000.0 Equinox ICRS
- Constellation: Virgo
- Right ascension: 14^{h} 20^{m} 53.518^{s}
- Declination: −17° 28′ 53.49″
- Apparent magnitude (V): 8.31 / ?

Characteristics
- Spectral type: G3V + M3- 4V
- Apparent magnitude (B): 8.938
- Apparent magnitude (J): 7.179±0.023
- Apparent magnitude (H): 6.950±0.059
- Apparent magnitude (K): 6.838±0.026
- B−V color index: 0.628±0.018

Astrometry
Radial velocity (R_{v})	−18.25±0.15 km/s
Proper motion (μ)	RA: −60.260±0.034 mas/yr Dec.: −67.314±0.027 mas/yr
Parallax (π)	17.2897±0.0279 mas
Distance	188.6 ± 0.3 ly (57.84 ± 0.09 pc)
Absolute magnitude (M_{V})	4.65

Position (relative to HD 125612 A)
Component	HD 125612 B
Angular distance	89.994±0.066″
Position angle	162.682±0.052°
Projected separation	~4,750 AU

Details
Mass	1.091±0.027 M_{☉} 1.133±0.025 M_{☉}
Radius	1.05±0.08 R_{☉}
Luminosity	1.09 L_{☉}
Surface gravity (log g)	4.41±0.05 cgs
Temperature	5,900±18 K
Metallicity [Fe/H]	0.23±0.014 dex
Rotational velocity (v sin i)	3.2 km/s
Age	1.351±1.127 Gyr

HD 125612 B
Mass	0.184±0.012 M_{☉}
Age	1-5 Gyr

Other designations
- BD−16°3844, HD 125612, HIP 70123, SAO 158501, PPM 228650, GSC 06143-01696

Database references
SIMBAD	data
Exoplanet Archive	data

HD 125612 is a binary star system with three exoplanetary companions in the equatorial constellation of Virgo. It is too dim to be visible to the naked eye, having an apparent visual magnitude of 8.31. The system is located at a distance of 188 light years from the Sun based on parallax measurements, but it is drifting closer with a radial velocity of −18 km/s.

The yellow-hued primary component, designated HD 125612 A, is an ordinary G-type main-sequence star with a stellar classification of G3V, which indicates it is generating energy through hydrogen fusion at its core. It is about 1.4 billion years old and is rich in heavy elements, having a 70% greater abundance of iron compared to the Sun. The star has 109% of the mass and 105% of the girth of the Sun. It is radiating 109% of the luminosity of the Sun from its photosphere at an effective temperature of 5,900 K.

A red dwarf companion star, HD 125612 B, was detected in 2009 at a projected separation of 4750 AU. The possibility of a much closer companion to the primary star was also suggested, though this will need more observation to better define.

== Planetary system ==
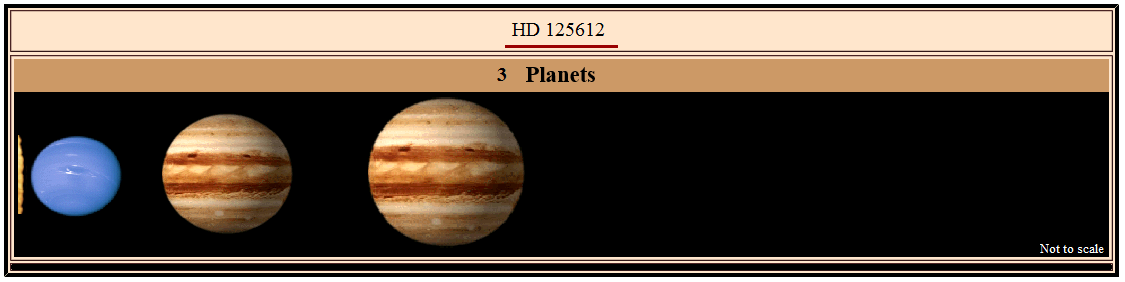
Diagram of the probable HD 125612 Star system.

There are three known exoplanets in orbit around HD 125612 A. The first was reported in 2007 and designated HD 125612 b, but it did not fully resolve the stellar velocity variations and it was clear there were other companions. Two additional companions, HD 125612 c and d, were reported in 2009. In 2022, the inclination and true mass of the outer planet HD 125612 d were measured via astrometry.

The HD 125612 planetary system
Companion (in order from star)	Mass	Semimajor axis (AU)	Orbital period (days)	Eccentricity	Inclination (°)	Radius
c	≥0.055±0.01 M_{J}	0.0524±0.0031	4.15514±0.00026	0.049±0.038	—	—
b	≥3.1±0.4 M_{J}	1.372±0.083	557.04±0.35	0.4553±0.0055	—	—
d	7.178+0.932 −0.445 M_{J}	3.982+0.159 −0.174	2822.7+15.0 −15.3	0.115±0.012	88.195+16.306 −15.980	—

== See also ==
- HD 170469
- HD 231701
- HD 17156
- HD 11506
- List of extrasolar planets
