= List of exoplanets discovered via astrometry =

Astrometry has been used to discover a handful of exoplanets, mostly gas giants more massive than Jupiter. It is based on measuring a star's proper motion, and seeing how that position changes over time: a planet with a sufficiently large mass is able to gravitationally pull its host star, making its proper motion vary over large timescales. This cause a proper motion discrepancy between two observations (e.g. Hipparcos and Gaia). This list contains discoveries using this method, it does not contain exoplanets first detected by another method, but later detected using astrometry, e.g. Epsilon Indi Ab or Gamma Cephei Ab.

== List ==
This list contain only confirmed planets. Many candidate planets were detected via astrometry, including Gliese 65 Ab (which would be the nearest planet detected by this method, if confirmed), 9,698 candidates shown in a paper as well as many more detected via Hipparcos-Gaia astrometry in another studies.

Name	Mass	Semi-major axis (AU)	Orbital period (years)	Eccentricity	Inclination (°)	Discovery year	Distance (ly)	Host star mass (M_{☉})	Host star radius (R_{☉})	Host star temperature (K)	Notes and references
AB Pictoris c	2.5–9.0 M_{J}	4±1				2025	163.5	0.90±0.10	0.92±0.03	5,188±50	
EQ Pegasi Ab	2.26±0.57 M_{J}	0.643±0.001	0.779±0.004	0.35±0.19	69.20±25.61	2022	20.428±0.004	0.436±0.001	0.409±0.016	3,491±35	
Gaia-4 b	10.70±0.32 M_{J}		1.577±0.002	0.319±0.012	120.5±1.6	2024	240.4 ± 0.3262	0.644+0.025 −0.023	0.624+0.014 −0.015	4,034±77	
HD 11506 d	12.8+0.6 −0.5 M_{J}	18.20+0.06 −0.09	72.6+0.7 −0.8	0.29+0.02 −0.03	90+6 −5	2022	167.0±0.2	1.22±0.02	1.06±0.01	5,833±28	
HD 28185 c	5.68+0.44 −0.36 M_{J}	8.54+0.21 −0.14	25.27+0.91 −0.61	0.15±0.04	73+10.0 −8.4 or 109.5+9.1 −12.0	2022	128.0±0.1	0.974±0.018	1.048±0.015	5,602±36	Initially discovered as a brown dwarf, revealed to be an exoplanet by later studies. Planetary parameters taken from Feng et al. 2024, stellar parameters from Venner et al. 2024.
HD 48265 c	4.45+0.75 −0.37 M_{J}	10.4+1.6 −1.0	28.52+6.71 −3.86	0.41+0.08 −0.06	89±29	2026	296.3±0.4	1.312±0.064	1.901±0.126	5,733±55	
HD 68475 b	5.16+0.53 −0.47 M_{J}	7.27+0.39 −0.36	21.44+1.27 −0.88			2026	109.0±0.1	0.83±0.10		5,022±113	
HD 75898 c	8.49+0.65 −0.63 M_{J}	7.39+0.04 −0.05	18.39+0.12 −0.11	0.08±0.01	153+2 −3	2024	254.6±0.7	1.295±0.015	1.58±0.11	6,122±52	
HD 118203 c	11.0+1.3 −1.0 M_{J}	6.20±0.20	13.9+0.66 −0.63	0.257±0.034	95+15 −19	2024	330.2±0.5	1.353±0.006	1.993±0.065	5,872±20	
HD 176051 b	1.5±0.3 or 2.26 M_{J}	1.76 or 2.02	2.78±0.11		115.8±8.2	2010	48.4±0.261	0.71 (B) or 1.07 (A)	0.81 (B) or 1.06 (A)	6,000 (A)	Orbiting either HD 176051 A or HD 176051 B, but more likely orbiting the latter.
HD 222237 b	5.19±0.58 M_{J}	10.8+1.1 −1.0	40.8+5.8 −4.5	0.56±0.03	49.9+3.4 −2.8	2024	37.3	0.76±0.09	0.71±0.06	4,751±139	
HIP 11696 b	4–16 M_{J}	2.5–28				2024	160.9±0.2	1.299±0.102	1.438±0.109	6,428±215	
HIP 47110 b	3–10 M_{J}	3–30				2024	126.2±0.1	0.891±0.070	0.873±0.060	5,507±184	
HIP 99770 b	16.1+5.4 −5.0 M_{J}	16.9+3.4 −1.9		0.25+0.14 −0.16	148+13 −11	2022	132.9±0.4	2.14±0.15	2.16	8,790+1,513 −1,300	Discovered by joint of astrometry and direct imaging. Its radius is about 1.5 R_{J}
MP Muscae b	5.0 M_{J}	1–3				2025	319.3±0.4	1.30±0.08	1.25	4,600	
TVLM 513–46546 b	0.347–0.418 M_{J}	0.279–0.307	0.61±0.014	~0	~80	2020	35.01±0.05	0.06–0.08	0.097–0.109	2,247±55	

== See also ==
- Methods of detecting exoplanets#Astrometry
- Lists of exoplanets
- Astrometric binary
- List of directly imaged exoplanets
- List of exoplanets detected by radial velocity
- List of exoplanets detected by microlensing
- List of transiting exoplanets
- List of exoplanets detected by timing
- List of exoplanets discovered in 2024
