= HD 1461 =

Star in the constellation Cetus

Observation data Epoch J2000.0 Equinox ICRS
- Constellation: Cetus
- Right ascension: 00^{h} 18^{m} 41.8677^{s}
- Declination: −08° 03′ 10.804″
- Apparent magnitude (V): 6.47

Characteristics
- Evolutionary stage: subgiant
- Spectral type: G3VFe0.5

Astrometry
Radial velocity (R_{v})	−10.14±0.09 km/s
Proper motion (μ)	RA: +417.579±0.033 mas/yr Dec.: −143.900±0.024 mas/yr
Parallax (π)	42.7308±0.0299 mas
Distance	76.33 ± 0.05 ly (23.40 ± 0.02 pc)
Absolute magnitude (M_{V})	4.63±0.03

Details
Mass	1.05±0.02 M_{☉}
Radius	1.2441±0.0305 R_{☉}
Luminosity	1.1893±0.0476 L_{☉}
Surface gravity (log g)	4.39 cgs
Temperature	5,386±60 K
Metallicity [Fe/H]	0.18±0.01 dex
Rotational velocity (v sin i)	4.8 km/s
Age	2.0±1.1 Gyr

Other designations
- 32 G. Ceti, BD−08°38, GJ 16.1, HD 1461, HIP 1499, HR 72, SAO 128690, PPM 182101, LTT 149, NLTT 950, GCRV 50265, 2MASS J00184182-0803105

Database references
SIMBAD	data
Exoplanet Archive	data
ARICNS	data

HD 1461 is a star in the equatorial constellation of Cetus, near the western constellation border with Aquarius. It has the Gould designation 32 G. Ceti, while HD 1461 is the Henry Draper Catalogue identifier. This object has a yellow hue and is a challenge to view with the naked eye, having an apparent visual magnitude of 6.47. The star is located at a distance of 76.3 light-years (23.4 parsecs) from the Sun based on parallax, but is drifting closer with a radial velocity of −10 km/s.

This object is a G-type main-sequence star with a stellar classification of G3VFe0.5, where the suffix notation indicates a mild overabundance of iron. It is roughly two billion years old and is spinning with a projected rotational velocity of 5 km/s. This is a solar-type star with 5% greater mass compared to the Sun and 1.24 times the Sun's radius. The star is radiating 1.19 times the luminosity of the Sun from its photosphere at an effective temperature of 5,386 K.

== Planetary system ==
On 14 December 2009, scientists announced the discovery at least one planet orbiting around HD 1461. The planet, a super-Earth with a 5.8-day orbit was designated HD 1461 b. The data also contained evidence for additional planets with orbital periods of around 400 and 5000 days but the star showed small variations with similar periods, casting doubt on the interpretation of these signals as being caused by orbiting planets.

In 2011, a paper was published on the arXiv pre-print server giving an orbital solution incorporating data from the HARPS spectrograph. This solution recovered the previously-known planet HD 1461 b, and an additional planet in a 13.5-day orbit. The 13.5-day planet HD 1461 c was confirmed in 2015. However, one 2026 study found that the radial velocity signal of HD 1461 c is likely correlated with stellar activity indicators, making its existence dubious.

Other than HD 1461 b, the designations for the planets are inconsistent: in the original paper, Rivera et al. designated the 400 and 5000-day candidates as "c" and "d" respectively, whereas the Mayor et al. (2011) pre-print uses the "c" designation for the 13.5-day planet and does not mention the 400-day or 5000-day planets at all.

HD 1461 b has a mass 6.44 times that of the Earth while HD 1461 c, if exists, would have a mass times 5.59 that of the Earth.

The HD 1461 planetary system
Companion (in order from star)	Mass	Semimajor axis (AU)	Orbital period (days)	Eccentricity	Inclination (°)	Radius
b	≥6.44±0.61 M_{🜨}	0.0634±0.0022	5.77152±0.00045	<0.131	—	—
c (dubious)	≥5.59±0.73 M_{🜨}	0.1117±0.0039	13.5052±0.0029	<0.228	—	—

== See also ==
- List of extrasolar planets
- List of stars in Cetus
