= HD 984 =

F-type star in the constellation Cetus

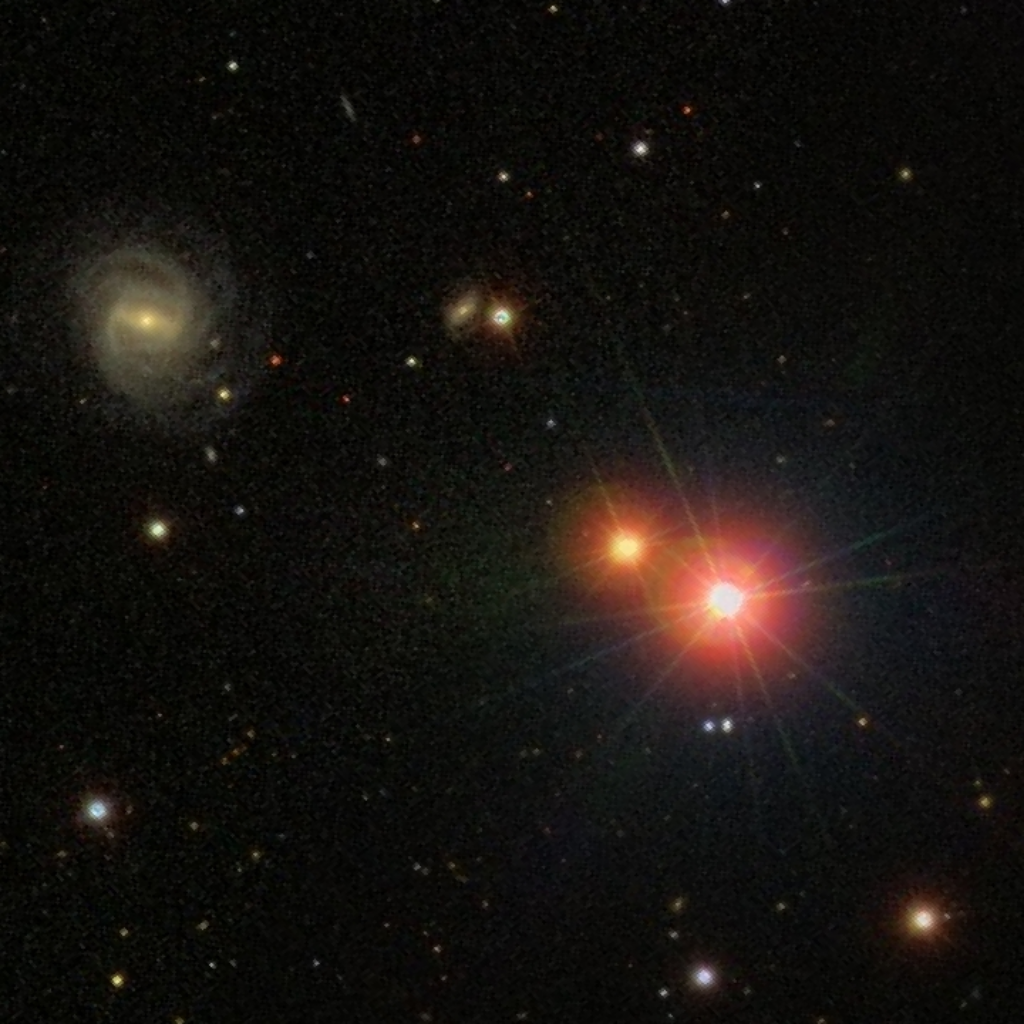
- HD 984 is the brightest star in this Sloan Digital Sky Survey image. The spiral galaxy NGC 47 can be seen at upper left.

Observation data Epoch J2000 Equinox J2000
- Constellation: Cetus
- Right ascension: 00^{h} 14^{m} 10.25283^{s}
- Declination: −07° 11′ 56.8127″
- Apparent magnitude (V): 7.32

Characteristics

A
- Evolutionary stage: Main sequence
- Spectral type: F7V
- B−V color index: 0.522±0.01

B
- Evolutionary stage: Brown dwarf
- Spectral type: M6.5±1.5
- Apparent magnitude (J): 13.28±0.06
- Apparent magnitude (H): 12.6±0.05

Astrometry
Radial velocity (R_{v})	1.04±0.25 km/s
Proper motion (μ)	RA: 104.775 mas/yr Dec.: −68.016 mas/yr
Parallax (π)	21.877±0.0249 mas
Distance	149.1 ± 0.2 ly (45.71 ± 0.05 pc)
Absolute magnitude (M_{V})	3.95±0.07

Position (relative to A)
Component	B
Epoch of observation	2015
Angular distance	201.6±0.4 mas
Position angle	92.2±0.5°

Orbit
Period (P)	97+18 −16 yr
Semi-major axis (a)	22.5+2.5 −2.3 AU
Eccentricity (e)	0.586±0.038
Inclination (i)	115.0+1.1 −0.9°
Longitude of the node (Ω)	153.7+4.3 −1.8°
Argument of periastron (ω) (secondary)	320.0+3.7 −8.5°

Details

A
Mass	1.133±0.033 M_{☉}
Radius	1.247±0.053 R_{☉}
Luminosity	2.218+0.142 −0.134 L_{☉}
Surface gravity (log g)	4.38±0.06 cgs
Temperature	6326±80 K
Metallicity [Fe/H]	−0.01±0.12 dex
Rotation	1.39±0.05 days
Rotational velocity (v sin i)	42.13±1.65 km/s
Age	30–200 Myr

B
Mass	68.4+2.5 −2.7 M_{Jup}
Radius	0.162 (Note: Applying the Stefan–Boltzmann law with a nominal solar effective temperature of 5,772 K: $$\sqrt{\biggl(\frac{5,772}{2,730}\biggr)^4 \cdot 10^{-2.88}} = 0.162\ R_\odot$$.) R_{☉}
Luminosity	1.318+0.094 −0.088×10^{−3} L_{☉}
Temperature	2730+120 −180 K
Metallicity [Fe/H]	−0.62±0.02 (Note: This value might be biased since it has been derived only using observations in the K band, which is not the best band to derive a metallicity.) dex
Rotational velocity (v sin i)	12.72+0.03 −0.02 km/s
Age	50–90 Myr

Other designations
- BD−08 24, HIP 1134, SAO 128650, PPM 182008, TIC 408012676, TYC 4670-773-1, GSC 04670-00773, 2MASS J00141025-0711569, Gaia DR2 2431157720981843200, Gaia DR3 2431157720981843200

Database references
SIMBAD	data

HD 984 is a F-type main-sequence star located in the equatorial constellation Cetus. It is a young star, estimated 30 to 200 million years old, and is orbited by a brown dwarf companion. Parallax measurements by the Gaia spacecraft imply a distance of 150 light-years (46 pc) to HD 984. At an apparent magnitude of 7.32, the star is too dim to be visible to the naked eye.

== Characteristics ==
The apparent magnitude of HD 984, i.e. its brightness relative to Earth, is 7.32. Such brightness is lower than the limit for naked-eye visibility, generally defined as 6.5^{m}, meaning that HD 984 can't be seen with the naked eye. It may be visible by a small telescope or binoculars instead. The absolute magnitude, i.e. the magnitude of HD 984 if it was seen at 10 parsecs (32.6 ly), is 3.95. Kinematically, the system it is part of the Columba group. It has a relatively high proper motion.

The star is visually close (57") to BD-08 25, which is a star of apparent magnitude 9.14 unrelated to the system, being 1,800 light-years (550 pc) away from Earth based on its parallax. The galaxy NGC 47 lies just 320" from HD 984.

=== Age estimates ===
Based on the assumption that HD 984 is part of the Columba group, the stellar age would be of 30 Myr. However, there is still a possibility that HD 984 is a kinematic interloper or the Columba group is not sufficiently characterized to reliably assign an age. Previous isochronal ages of <0.48, 1.2+0.7
−0.9 and 3.1+1
−1.6 Gyr have been given by earlier studies. Since HD 984 A is a main sequence star, all isochronal ages will have high uncertainty.

An analysis by HD 984 B's discovery team say that the system is likely to be less than 200 million years, based on HD 984 A's rotation and stellar activity. The same research also says that ages less than 30 million years can be ruled out, based on isochronal age constraints for HD 984 B. Therefore, the age is very likely between 30 and 200 million years.

== HD 984 A ==
HD 984 A is a F-type main-sequence star, spectroscopically matching a class F7V. Those stars are typically larger, hotter and brighter than the Sun, and fuse hydrogen into helium at their core. HD 984 A is no expection, being 13% more massive than the Sun, 25% larger and over two times brighter. Its surface has an effective temperature of 6,326 K (6,053 °C), giving it a yello-white hue typical of F-type stars. HD 984 A rotates faster than 99% of all stars, with a rotation period estimated to be less than 1.6 days (38 hours). The Sun's rotational period is 27 days for comparison.

Its rotation, coronal activity and cromospheric activity indicates that it is a young and active main-sequence star, likely less than 200 million years old. It is expected to live 5 billion years on the main sequence. After that, it will cease its hydrogen at its core and evolve into a red giant star, increasing in size and luminosity, while decreasing in temperature.

== HD 984 B ==
HD 984 B is a brown dwarf, a class of astronomical objects that are intermediate between planets and stars, having masses between 13 and 75 M_{J}, and, unlike stars, can't produce thermonuclear fusion of hydrogen. It was discovered in 2015 by Meshkat et al., using direct imaging from the Apodizing Phase Plate coronagraph at the Very Large Telescope with NaCo.

=== Orbit ===
HD 984 B takes nearly 100 years to complete an orbit around HD 984 A, slightly more than Uranus. The orbit's semi-major axis is of 22.5 astronomical units (3.37×10^{9} km), also slightly larger than Uranus's. Its orbit is somewhat eccentric, with (e = 0.59±0.04), meaning that its orbital distance varies from 9.3 to 35.7 AU. (Note: Calculated using the semi-major axis and the orbital eccentricity. 22.5×(1-0.586) = 9.3 AU. 22.5×(1+0.586) = 35.7 AU.) Previous studies found a lower eccentricity (e = 0.23+0.11
−0.23), as well as a lower semi-major axis of 17.6+4.3
−8.1 AU. This difference is explained due to the increased orbit coverage and astrometric acceleration used in the newer values.

=== Physical parameters ===
Its mass was firstly estimated using the age of the system by Meshkat et al. (2015) and Jonson-Groh et al. (2017). Using this method, masses ranging from 34 M_{J} to 94 M_{J} are obtained, assuming ages of 30 and 200 million years respectively. Assuming the largest mass and age, HD 984 B would be in the stellar mass regime. A 2022 study found a dynamical mass of 61±4 M_{J}, which places HD 984 B in the brown dwarf regime at 99.7% confidence. This mass was obtained using astrometric acceleration, new direct imaging of the object and radial velocity measurements, and is consistent with evolutionary models. The dynamical mass was improved to 68.4+2.5
−2.7 M_{J} in 2026.

HD 984 B is a hot brown dwarf and has a spectral class of M6.5, with an uncertainty of 1.5. Having this spectral type, HD 984 B has an effective temperature of 2730 K. At a luminosity of about 1.318×10^{−3} L_{☉}, this corresponds to a radius of 0.162 R_{☉} (1.576 R_{J}) based on the Stefan–Boltzmann law. Its metallicity, i.e. its abundance of elements other than hydrogen and helium, is −0.62±0.02 dex, just one-fourth of the solar metallicity (0 dex), although this value might be biased. This brown dwarf more likely formed via gravitational collapse or disk instability rather than core accretion.

== See also ==
- Epsilon Indi, 54 Piscium and Eta Telescopii, another stars orbited by brown dwarfs
- List of brown dwarfs
- List of stars in Cetus
