= HD 5319 =

Star in the constellation Cetus

Observation data Epoch J2000.0 Equinox ICRS
- Constellation: Cetus
- Right ascension: 00^{h} 77^{m} 01.3977^{s}
- Declination: +00° 47′ 22.401″
- Apparent magnitude (V): 8.05

Characteristics
- Spectral type: K3IV

Astrometry
| Proper motion (μ) | RA: −5.398±0.105 mas/yr Dec.: −49.564±0.063 mas/yr |
| Parallax (π) | 8.2083±0.0476 mas |
| Distance | 397 ± 2 ly (121.8 ± 0.7 pc) |
| Absolute magnitude (M_{V}) | +2.78 |

Details
| Mass | 1.40 ± 0.14 M_{☉} |
| Radius | 3.97 ± 0.43 R_{☉} |
| Luminosity | 9 L_{☉} |
| Temperature | 4,921 K |
| Metallicity [Fe/H] | +0.14 dex |
| Age | 3.30 ± 1.11 Gyr |

Other designations
- BD+00°142, HIP 4297, SAO 109532, 2MASS 2MASS J00550140+0047223, Gaia DR2 2537319343919089024

Database references
| SIMBAD | data |
| Exoplanet Archive | data |

HD 5319 is an 8th magnitude star approximately 319 light years away in the constellation Cetus. It is a subgiant star of spectral type K3, having run out of hydrogen in its core. When it was main-sequence, the spectral type was early F or late A.

The absolute magnitude (apparent magnitude at 10 parsecs) is 3.05, which would translate to easy naked eye visibility, but its distance is ten times greater, so its apparent magnitude is 8.05 (100 times fainter than its absolute magnitude), it is not visible to the naked eye and binoculars are needed.

== Planetary system ==
On January 11, 2007, the California and Carnegie Planet Search team found an extrasolar planet with a minimum mass 1.76 times that of Jupiter orbiting the star. It was published in the December 1, 2007 edition of the Astrophysical Journal. A second planet was discovered in November 2014. Orbital simulations of the dynamical stability of the planetary system indicate that it is likely in a 4:3 mean motion resonance. Previous computer simulations have shown an inability to reproduce this resonance in gas giant systems using a variety of formation and migration mechanisms. Additional analysis on the stability of the system show that the planets orbits may have to be inclined to one another to maintain stability, although simplest solution as in 2019 still indicate the planetary system of HD 5319 is unstable.

The HD 5319 planetary system
| Companion (in order from star) | Mass | Semimajor axis (AU) | Orbital period (days) | Eccentricity | Inclination (°) | Radius |
|---|---|---|---|---|---|---|
| b | ≥1.56±0.29 M_{J} | 1.57±0.13 | 638.6±1.2 | 0.015±0.016 | — | — |
| c | ≥1.02±0.22 M_{J} | 1.94±0.16 | 877.0±4.9 | 0.109±0.067 | — | — |

== See also ==
- HD 75898
- List of extrasolar planets
