= HD 75898 =

Star in the constellation Lynx

HD 75898 / Stribor
Observation data Epoch J2000.0 Equinox ICRS
- Constellation: Lynx
- Right ascension: 08^{h} 53^{m} 50.80524^{s}
- Declination: +33° 03′ 24.5206″
- Apparent magnitude (V): 8.03

Characteristics
- Spectral type: F8V
- B−V color index: 0.626

Astrometry
Radial velocity (R_{v})	21.79±0.13 km/s
Proper motion (μ)	RA: −95.110(29) mas/yr Dec.: −28.503(26) mas/yr
Parallax (π)	12.8110±0.0329 mas
Distance	254.6 ± 0.7 ly (78.1 ± 0.2 pc)
Absolute magnitude (M_{V})	3.49

Details
Mass	1.295±0.015 M_{☉}
Radius	1.58±0.11 R_{☉}
Luminosity	2.9±0.3 L_{☉}
Surface gravity (log g)	4.34±0.13 cgs
Temperature	6122±52 K
Metallicity [Fe/H]	+0.29±0.06 dex
Rotational velocity (v sin i)	4.2±0.5 km/s
Age	3.2±0.4 Gyr

Other designations
- Stribor, BD+33°1776, HD 75898, HIP 43674, SAO 61116

Database references
SIMBAD	data

HD 75898 is an 8th magnitude star approximately 255 light-years away in the constellation Lynx. The star is 28% more massive, 60% larger, and 3 times as luminous as the Sun. It is a metal-rich star, with 186% the solar abundance of iron. In 2007 the California and Carnegie Planet Search team found one planet orbiting HD 75898.

== Nomenclature ==
In 2019 the HD 75898 system was chosen as part of the NameExoWorlds campaign organised by the International Astronomical Union, which assigned each country a star and planet to be named. HD 75898 was assigned to Croatia. The winning proposal named the star Stribor, after the god of winds in Slavic mythology, and the planet b Veles, after a deity of earth, water and the underworld in Slavic mythology.

== Planetary system ==
The planet HD 75898 b was discovered by the radial velocity method in 2007. At the time the centre of mass of the system appeared to be accelerating, indicating the presence of a third, more distant, component at least the mass of Jupiter. Later additional monitoring however indicated that this long-period signal was likely a result of long-term magnetic activity on the parent star.

However in 2024, an additional long-period planet, HD 75898 c, was confirmed using both astrometry and radial velocity, in addition to an intermediate-period activity cycle. Both planets are super-Jupiters, with planet c having a mass 8.5 times that of Jupiter, and planet b having a minimum mass 2.5 times that of Jupiter, with a likely true mass of about 6 Jupiters if coplanar orbits are assumed.

The HD 75898 planetary system
Companion (in order from star)	Mass	Semimajor axis (AU)	Orbital period (days)	Eccentricity	Inclination (°)	Radius
b (Veles)	≥2.55±0.04 M_{J}	1.2025±0.0047	422.82±0.22	0.105±0.009	—	—
c	8.49+0.65 −0.63 M_{J}	7.39+0.04 −0.05	6717+44 −40	0.08±0.01	153+2 −3	—

== See also ==
- HD 5319
- List of extrasolar planets
