= HD 11964 =

Binary star system in the constellation Cetus

Observation data Epoch J2000.0 Equinox ICRS
- Constellation: Cetus
- Right ascension: 01^{h} 57^{m} 09.6074^{s}
- Declination: −10° 14′ 32.732″
- Apparent magnitude (V): 7.51

Characteristics
- Spectral type: G9VCN+1 + M0.0Ve
- Apparent magnitude (U): 7.705
- Apparent magnitude (B): 8.117
- Apparent magnitude (R): 5.960
- Apparent magnitude (I): 6.914
- Apparent magnitude (J): 6.508±0.019
- Apparent magnitude (H): 6.265±0.031
- Apparent magnitude (K): 6.168±0.017
- U−B color index: 0.450
- B−V color index: 0.607±0.015
- V−R color index: 0.455
- R−I color index: 0.405
- Variable type: Suspected

Astrometry
Radial velocity (R_{v})	−9.34±0.08 km/s
Proper motion (μ)	RA: −366.957±0.070 mas/yr Dec.: −242.431±0.052 mas/yr
Parallax (π)	29.7890±0.0378 mas
Distance	109.5 ± 0.1 ly (33.57 ± 0.04 pc)
Absolute magnitude (M_{V})	3.84

Details

A
Mass	1.12±0.03 M_{☉}
Radius	2.234±0.304 R_{☉}
Luminosity	2.9 L_{☉}
Surface gravity (log g)	3.94±0.03 cgs
Temperature	5,321±16 K
Metallicity [Fe/H]	0.06±0.04 dex
Rotational velocity (v sin i)	1.52±0.23 km/s
Age	7.02±0.67 Gyr

B
Radius	0.60+0.04 −0.03 R_{☉}
Luminosity	0.085 L_{☉}
Temperature	4,033+79 −133 K
Metallicity [Fe/H]	0.12±0.03 dex

Other designations
- BD−10°403, GC 2351, GJ 81.1, GJ 9063, HD 11964, HIP 9094, SAO 148123, WDS 01572-1015

Database references
SIMBAD	data
Exoplanet Archive	data
ARICNS	data

HD 11964 is a binary star system located 110 light-years away from the Sun in the equatorial constellation of Cetus. It is visible in binoculars or a telescope but is too faint to be seen with the naked eye, having an apparent visual magnitude of 7.51. The system is drifting closer to the Sun with a radial velocity of −9 km/s. Two extrasolar planets have been confirmed to orbit the primary.

== Properties ==
The primary, component A, is a G-type main-sequence star with a stellar classification of G9VCN+1. The suffix notation indicates an overabundance of the cyano radical in the spectrum. Houk and Swift (1999) found a class of G8IV, suggesting it is instead a more evolved subgiant star. It is around seven billion years old and is spinning slowly with a projected rotational velocity of 1.5 km/s. The star has 1.1 times the mass of the Sun and 2.2 times the Sun's radius. It is radiating 2.9 times the luminosity of the Sun from its photosphere at an effective temperature of 5,321 K.

A wide binary companion star was discovered in 2000. This secondary, designated component B, has a visual magnitude of 11.11 and lies at an angular separation of 29.7″ along a position angle of 134°, as of 2015. It is a red dwarf with a class of M0V, and has just 0.6 times the Sun's radius. It is radiating 0.085 times the Sun's luminosity at an effective temperature of 4,033 K.

== Planetary system ==
In August 2005, two planets were discovered orbiting the star, the innermost like Neptune and another like Jupiter orbiting at 3.34 AU. However, the second planet (HD 11964 b) was not confirmed until May 2007. In September 2007, P.C. Gregory claimed that there was a third planet in the system on the basis of Bayesian analysis of the radial velocity data. The planet was claimed to have a mass similar to that of Saturn and located in a 360-day orbit. Gregory cautioned that the close match between the period of this planet to being exactly a year meant that the radial velocity variations may have been caused by insufficient correction for the motion of the Earth in orbit around the Sun. The planet was not detected in re-reduced data in an analysis published in the Astrophysical Journal in 2009.

The HD 11964 planetary system
Companion (in order from star)	Mass	Semimajor axis (AU)	Orbital period (days)	Eccentricity	Inclination (°)	Radius
c	≥ 0.11 M_{J}	0.229	37.82	0.15	—	—
b	≥ 0.61±0.1 M_{J}	3.34±0.4	2,110±70	0.06±0.2	—	—

== See also ==
- HD 11977
- List of extrasolar planets
