= HD 125612 b =

Extrasolar planet in the constellation of Virgo

Discovery
- Discovered by: Fischer et al.
- Discovery site: California, United States
- Discovery date: April 10, 2007
- Detection method: Radial velocity

Orbital characteristics
- Semi-major axis: 1.372±0.083 AU
- Eccentricity: 0.4553±0.0055
- Orbital period (sidereal): 557.04±0.35 d
- Time of periastron: 2463221.8±1.7
- Argument of periastron: 42.0±1.0
- Semi-amplitude: 80.46±0.53
- Star: HD 125612

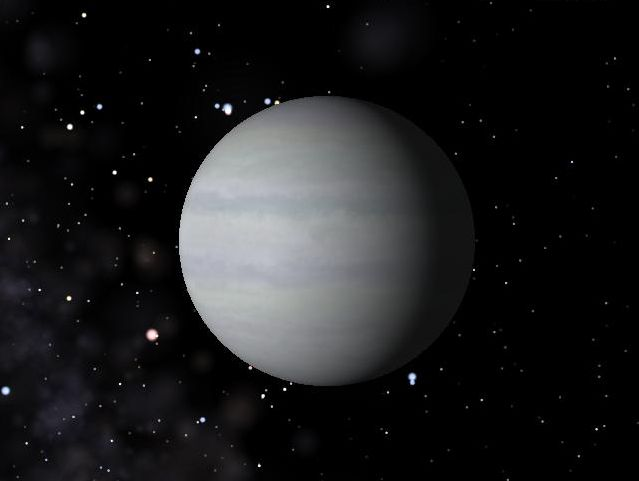
Planet HD 125612 b

HD 125612 b is an extrasolar planet which orbits the G-type main sequence star HD 125612, located approximately 188 light years away in the constellation Virgo. This planet was detected using the doppler spectroscopy method and the discovery was first announced in a paper submitted to the arXiv preprint repository on April 10, 2007.
