= HD 125612 c =

Exoplanet orbiting the star HD 125162

Discovery
- Discovered by: Lo Curto et al.
- Discovery site: La Silla Observatory
- Discovery date: October 19, 2009
- Detection method: Radial velocity (HARPS)

Orbital characteristics
- Semi-major axis: 0.0524±0.0031 AU
- Eccentricity: 0.049±0.038
- Orbital period (sidereal): 4.15514±0.00026 d
- Time of periastron: 2463057.6±1.7
- Argument of periastron: 123±147
- Semi-amplitude: 6.46±0.44
- Star: HD 125612

HD 125612 c is an extrasolar planet which orbits the G-type main sequence star HD 125612, located approximately 188 light years away in the constellation Virgo. The discovery of this planet was announced by the HARPS team on October 19, 2009, together with 31 other planets, including HD 125612 d.

In April 2010, the Spitzer Space Telescope was used to search for the transit of this planet across the face of its host star. The initial light curve was consistent with a transit, however new observations with Spitzer in September 2010 did not confirm the transit signal. Analysis of both Spitzer light curves showed that the possibility of a transit was only 0.24% compared to 9.7% prior to these observations.
