= HD 125612 d =

Extrasolar planet

Discovery
- Discovered by: Lo Curto et al.
- Discovery site: La Silla Observatory
- Discovery date: October 19, 2009
- Detection method: Radial velocity (HARPS)

Orbital characteristics
- Semi-major axis: 3.982+0.159 −0.174 AU
- Eccentricity: 0.115±0.012
- Orbital period (sidereal): 7.728 ± 0.04 years (2,823 ± 15 d)
- Inclination: 88.195°+16.306° −15.980°
- Longitude of ascending node: 266.997°+22.666° −22.900°
- Time of periastron: 2452663.845+3.730 −3.324
- Argument of periastron: 315.896°+6.522° −6.555°
- Semi-amplitude: 100.067+1.277 −1.286 m/s
- Star: HD 125612

Physical characteristics
- Mass: 7.178+0.932 −0.445 M_{J}

HD 125612 d is an extrasolar planet which orbits the G-type main sequence star HD 125612, located approximately 172 light years away in the constellation Virgo. The discovery of this planet was announced by the HARPS team on October 19, 2009, together with 31 other planets, including HD 125612 c.

In 2022, the true mass and inclination of HD 125612 d were measured via astrometry.
