= HD 6718 =

Star in the constellation Cetus

Observation data Epoch J2000.0 Equinox ICRS
- Constellation: Cetus
- Right ascension: 01^{h} 07^{m} 48.66304^{s}
- Declination: −08° 14′ 01.3307″
- Apparent magnitude (V): 8.45

Characteristics
- Evolutionary stage: main sequence
- Spectral type: G5V
- Apparent magnitude (B): 9.087
- Apparent magnitude (J): 7.269
- Apparent magnitude (H): 6.99
- Apparent magnitude (K): 6.876
- B−V color index: 0.662±0.009

Astrometry
| Radial velocity (R_{v}) | +34.69±0.13 km/s |
| Proper motion (μ) | RA: +192.581 mas/yr Dec.: +20.077 mas/yr |
| Parallax (π) | 19.4544±0.0228 mas |
| Distance | 167.7 ± 0.2 ly (51.40 ± 0.06 pc) |
| Absolute magnitude (M_{V}) | 4.754 |

Details
| Mass | 0.98±0.04 M_{☉} |
| Radius | 1.01±0.02 R_{☉} |
| Luminosity | 1.07±0.01 L_{☉} |
| Surface gravity (log g) | 4.42±0.02 cgs |
| Temperature | 5,728±5 K |
| Metallicity [Fe/H] | −0.064±0.004 dex |
| Rotational velocity (v sin i) | 2.00±0.12 km/s |
| Age | 6.0±2.4 Gyr |

Other designations
- BD−09°221, HD 6718, HIP 5301, SAO 129137, PPM 183064, LTT 641, NLTT 3753

Database references
| SIMBAD | data |
| Exoplanet Archive | data |

HD 6718 is a solar twin star in the equatorial constellation of Cetus. It has a yellow hue but is too faint to be viewed with the naked eye, having an apparent visual magnitude of 8.45. The distance to this object, as determined from parallax measurements, is 168 light-years. It is drifting away from the Sun with a radial velocity of +35 km/s.

This object is an ordinary G-type main-sequence star with a stellar classification of G5V, with the luminosity class of 'V' indicating it is generating energy through hydrogen fusion at its core. It is around six billion years old with a leisurely rotation rate, having a projected rotational velocity of 2 km/s. The level of magnetic activity in the chromosphere is considered very low and it has a near solar metallicity. Being a solar twin, has nearly the same mass and radius as the Sun. The star is radiating 1.07 times the luminosity of the Sun from its photosphere at an effective temperature of 5,728 K.

In 2009, a substellar companion (HD 6718 b) was found in orbit around the star with a period of 6.83 years. It has a minimum mass of 1.56 M_{J}, consistent with a gas giant planet. In 2020, the inclination of this object was measured via astrometry, suggesting a true mass of 62.8 M_{J}, which would make it a brown dwarf. However, a more recent astrometric study in 2026 found a much smaller true mass, again consistent with a planet.

The HD 6718 planetary system
| Companion (in order from star) | Mass | Semimajor axis (AU) | Orbital period (days) | Eccentricity | Inclination (°) | Radius |
|---|---|---|---|---|---|---|
| b | 2.4+0.3 −0.2 M_{J} | 3.53±0.05 | 2476±19 | 0.06±0.03 | 51.4+16.4 −11.5 | — |

== See also ==
- List of extrasolar planets
