= HD 2638 =

Star system in the constellation Cetus

Observation data Epoch J2000.0 Equinox ICRS
- Constellation: Cetus
- Right ascension: 00^{h} 29^{m} 59.8721^{s}
- Declination: −05° 45′ 50.399″
- Apparent magnitude (V): 9.44

Characteristics
- Spectral type: K1V (G8V + M1V)
- B−V color index: +0.886±0.003

Astrometry
Radial velocity (R_{v})	+9.576±0.0010 km/s
Proper motion (μ)	RA: −107.019±0.094 mas/yr Dec.: −223.039±0.062 mas/yr
Parallax (π)	18.1656±0.0510 mas
Distance	179.5 ± 0.5 ly (55.0 ± 0.2 pc)
Absolute magnitude (M_{V})	5.96

Orbit
Primary	HD 2638 A
Name	HD 2638 BC
Period (P)	130 yr
Semi-major axis (a)	25.5±1.9 AU

Details

A
Mass	0.89±0.02 M_{☉}
Radius	0.8±0.01 R_{☉}
Luminosity	0.407±0.004 L_{☉}
Surface gravity (log g)	4.58±0.02 cgs
Temperature	5,160±24 K
Metallicity [Fe/H]	0.12±0.05 dex
Age	1.9±2.6 Gyr

BC
Mass	0.425±0.067 M_{☉}
Radius	0.46±0.02 R_{☉}
Luminosity	0.030±0.005 L_{☉}
Surface gravity (log g)	4.80±0.02 cgs
Temperature	3571±48 K

Other designations
- BD−06°82, HD 2638, HIP 2350, WDS J00293-0555BC, NLTT 1594, 2MASS J00295988-0545502, Gaia DR2 2526925389919277056

Database references
SIMBAD	data
Exoplanet Archive	data

HD 2638 is a ternary star system system in the equatorial constellation of Cetus. The pair have an angular separation of 0.53″ along a position angle of 166.7°, as of 2015. This is system too faint to be visible to the naked eye, having a combined apparent visual magnitude of 9.44; a small telescope is required. The distance to this system is 179.5 light years based on parallax, and it is drifting further away with a radial velocity of +9.6 km/s. The magnitude 7.76 star HD 2567 forms a common proper motion companion to this pair at projected separation 839″.

The HD 2638 members A and BC have a projected separation of about 25.5±1.9 AU and thus an orbital period of around 130 years. They have a combined stellar classification of K1V. The primary component is a G-type main-sequence star with a class of G8V. It is smaller and less massive than the Sun, and has a lower luminosity. The secondary is a binary consisting of two red dwarf stars on close orbit with combined mass less than half the mass of the primary, and a composite spectral class of M1V.

== Planetary system ==
In 2005, the discovery of an extrasolar planet HD 2638 b orbiting the primary was announced by the Geneva Extrasolar Planet Search Team. The planet has a mass 0.48 times that of Jupiter and 152.6 times that of Earth. The planet existence was placed under doubt in 2015 due to discovered additional stellar companions.

The HD 2638 planetary system
Companion (in order from star)	Mass	Semimajor axis (AU)	Orbital period (days)	Eccentricity	Inclination (°)	Radius
b	>0.48 M_{J}	0.044	3.4442±0.0002	0.0407	—	—

== See also ==
- List of extrasolar planets
