= NGC 47 =

Galaxy in the constellation Cetus

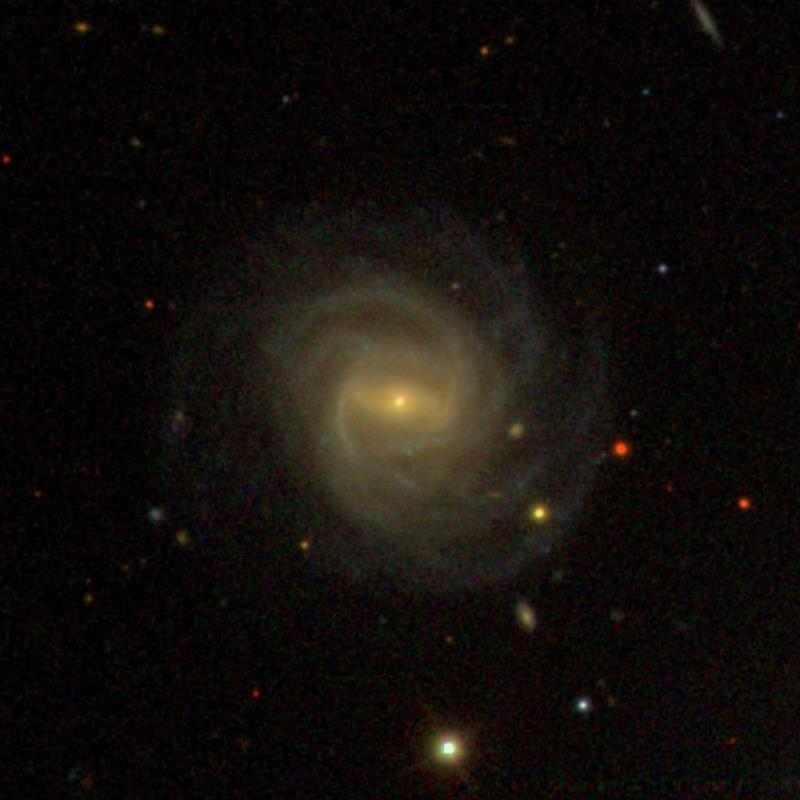
- SDSS image of NGC 47

Observation data (J2000 epoch)
- Constellation: Cetus
- Right ascension: 00^{h} 14^{m} 30.6^{s}
- Declination: −07° 10′ 03″
- Redshift: 0.019013
- Heliocentric radial velocity: 5700 ± 3 km/s
- Distance: ~236 Mly (redshift)
- Apparent magnitude (V): 13.5

Characteristics
- Type: SB(rs)bc
- Apparent size (V): 2.2′ × 2.1′
- Notable features: none

Other designations
- NGC 58, PGC 967, MCG 1-1-55, IRAS 00119-0726

NGC 47 (also known as NGC 58, MCG -1-1-55, IRAS00119-0726 and PGC 967) is a barred spiral galaxy in the constellation Cetus, discovered in 1886 by Ernst Wilhelm Leberecht Tempel. Its alternate name NGC 58 is due to the observation by Lewis Swift, who was unaware that Tempel had already discovered the celestial object earlier. It appears as a small, faint spiral nebula with a bright core and is slightly oval.

It is approximately 236 Mly (236 million light years) from Earth, measured by way of a generic "redshift estimate".
