= HD 11506 b =

Extrasolar planet orbiting HD 11506

Discovery
- Discovered by: Fischer et al.
- Discovery site: California, United States
- Discovery date: April 10, 2007
- Detection method: Radial velocity

Orbital characteristics
- Semi-major axis: 2.800+0.123 −0.136 AU
- Eccentricity: 0.391±0.010
- Orbital period (sidereal): 4.418 ± 0.012 years (1,613.7 ± 4.4 d)
- Inclination: 112.598°+23.304° −52.700°
- Longitude of ascending node: 80.266°+23.453° −41.201°
- Time of periastron: 2451787.838+16.442 −12.388
- Argument of periastron: 217.469°+2.387° −2.314°
- Semi-amplitude: 78.402+1.408 −1.146 m/s
- Star: HD 11506

Physical characteristics
- Mass: 4.880+1.986 −0.333 M_{J}

HD 11506 b is an extrasolar planet that orbits the star HD 11506 167 light years away in the constellation of Cetus. This planet was discovered in 2007 by the N2K Consortium using the Keck telescope to detect the radial velocity variation of the star caused by the planet. A second planet, HD 11506 c, was discovered in 2015.

In 2022, the true mass and inclination of HD 11506 b were measured via astrometry, along with the discovery of a third planet in the system.

== See also ==
- HD 11506 c
