= HD 1690 =

Star in the constellation of Cetus

Observation data Epoch J2000.0 Equinox ICRS
- Constellation: Cetus
- Right ascension: 00^{h} 21^{m} 13.327^{s}
- Declination: −08° 16′ 52.16″
- Apparent magnitude (V): 9.19

Characteristics
- Evolutionary stage: Giant
- Spectral type: K1 III
- B−V color index: 1.354±0.045

Astrometry
Radial velocity (R_{v})	+18.216±0.011 km/s
Proper motion (μ)	RA: 13.285 mas/yr Dec.: 2.919 mas/yr
Parallax (π)	1.2679±0.0273 mas
Distance	2,570 ± 60 ly (790 ± 20 pc)

Details
Mass	1.18±0.23 M_{☉}
Radius	16.7 R_{☉}
Surface gravity (log g)	2.12±0.17 cgs
Temperature	4,393±85 K
Metallicity [Fe/H]	−0.32±0.06 dex
Rotational velocity (v sin i)	1.86±0.07 km/s
Age	6.7±3.2 Gyr

Other designations
- BD−09 54, HD 1690, HIP 1692, TYC 5262-825-1, 2MASS J00211332-0816521, Gaia DR2 2430036837596487424

Database references
SIMBAD	data
Exoplanet Archive	data

HD 1690 is a giant star with an orbiting exoplanet companion in the constellation of Cetus. It has an apparent visual magnitude of 9.19, which is too faint to be visible to the naked eye. The distance to this system is approximately 2,570 light years, and it is drifting further away with a radial velocity of +18.2 km/s. HD 1690 has no known companion star, making it a single star system.

This is an evolved K-type giant star with a stellar classification of K1 III. It has 1.18 times the mass of the Sun and, at the estimated age of 6.7 billion years (two billion years older than the Sun), it has expanded to 16 times the Sun's radius. The surface metallicity of HD 1690 (the abundance of elements more massive than helium) is 30% that of the sun. The Hipparcos parallax data have resulted in a distance determination of just 1,012 light years, but more recent data from Gaia data have placed HD 1690 much farther from the Sun at 2,500 light years.

== Planetary system ==
In 2010, a team of astronomers led by astronomer C. Moutou of the High Accuracy Radial Velocity Planet Searcher performed a radial-velocity analysis that detected a gas giant planet in orbit around HD 1690.

The planet HD 1690 b has a very eccentric (far from circular) orbit; its orbital eccentricity is 0.64. Its mass is at least six times that of Jupiter, classifying it as a super-Jupiter. Other planets in the HD 1690 system are unlikely unless they are located on unstable crossing orbital paths.

The HD 1690 planetary system
Companion (in order from star)	Mass	Semimajor axis (AU)	Orbital period (days)	Eccentricity	Inclination (°)	Radius
b	>6.1±0.9 M_{J}	1.3±0.02	533±1.7	0.64±0.04	—	—
