= HD 11964 c =

Exoplanet orbiting HD 11964 in the constellation Cetus

Discovery
- Discovered by: Butler et al.
- Discovery site: California, United States
- Discovery date: 5 August 2005; Confirmed 27 May 2007
- Detection method: Doppler spectroscopy

Orbital characteristics
- Semi-major axis: 0.229 AU (34.3 million km)
- Eccentricity: 0.15
- Orbital period (sidereal): 37.82 d
- Time of periastron: 2,454,370 ± 380
- Argument of periastron: 102
- Semi-amplitude: 4.65 ± 0.59
- Star: HD 11964

HD 11964 c is an extrasolar planet approximately 110 light-years away in the constellation of Cetus. The planet was discovered in a close-orbit around the yellow subgiant star HD 11964. The planet has a minimum mass 35 times the mass of Earth and is located in a mildly eccentric orbit which takes almost 38 days to complete. HD 11964 c was a possible planet discovered on the same day as HD 11964 b in 2005. HD 11964 c was first proposed in a paper published in 2007, and finally confirmed with new data presented in a review of multi-planet systems which appeared on the arXiv preprint website in 2008.

Some sources have used the designation "HD 11964 b" for this planet; however, in their review of the properties of multi-planet extrasolar planetary systems, the discovery team has stated that the correct designation for this planet is HD 11964 c and the reversed system was due to confusion related to private communications between various groups of astronomers.
