= HD 11506 c =

Extrasolar planet orbiting HD 11506

Discovery
- Discovered by: Giguere et al.
- Discovery date: 2015

Orbital characteristics
- Semi-major axis: 0.774±0.038 AU
- Eccentricity: 0.193±0.038
- Orbital period (sidereal): 223.41±0.32 d
- Time of periastron: 2463230±11
- Argument of periastron: 259±16
- Semi-amplitude: 12.1±0.41
- Star: HD 11506

HD 11506 c is an extrasolar planet located approximately 167 light years away in the constellation of Cetus, orbiting the 8th magnitude G-type main sequence star HD 11506. It is the second planet in this system, and its discovery was first claimed in 2009 by using Bayesian analysis on data previously collected by the N2K Consortium. However, in 2015 additional radial velocity measurements showed that the planetary parameters were significantly different from those determined by Bayesian analysis.

== See also ==
- HD 11506 b
