= HD 18262 =

F-type star in the constellation Cetus

Observation data Epoch J2000 Equinox J2000
- Constellation: Cetus
- Right ascension: 02^{h} 56^{m} 13.767^{s}
- Declination: +08° 22′ 53.62″
- Apparent magnitude (V): 5.963

Characteristics
- Evolutionary stage: main sequence
- Spectral type: F6III-IVs
- Apparent magnitude (B): 6.431±0.015
- Apparent magnitude (G): 5.861±0.003
- Apparent magnitude (J): 5.134±0.037
- Apparent magnitude (H): 4.934±0.098
- Apparent magnitude (K): 4.845±0.02
- B−V color index: 0.437

Astrometry
Radial velocity (R_{v})	27.38±0.15 km/s
Proper motion (μ)	RA: +111.39 mas/yr Dec.: −89.435 mas/yr
Parallax (π)	23.1485±0.0873 mas
Distance	142.766 ly (43.7931 pc)
Absolute magnitude (M_{V})	2.79

Details
Mass	1.54±0.03 M_{☉}
Radius	1.996 R_{☉}
Luminosity	6.017 L_{☉}
Surface gravity (log g)	4.19 cgs
Temperature	6404 K
Metallicity [Fe/H]	0.358 dex
Rotational velocity (v sin i)	8.26 km/s
Age	1.64+0.29 −0.22 Gyr

Other designations
- BD+07 450, HD 18262, HIP 13679, HR 870, SAO 110851, PPM 146068, TIC 387541497, TYC 641-763-1, GSC 00641-00763, IRAS 02535+0810, 2MASS J02561376+0822534, WISE J025613.80+082252.8, Gaia DR2 8810116091022208, Gaia DR3 8810116091022208

Database references
SIMBAD	data

HD 18262 (HR 870, HIP 13679) is an F-type main sequence or subgiant star located in the constellation Cetus. It has an apparent magnitude of 5.963, which makes it faintly visible to the naked eye. According to the Gaia spacecraft, HD 18262 is located at a distance of 43.79 parsecs (142.8 light-years) and is moving away from Earth at a velocity of 27.4 km/s. Considering the apparent magnitude and the distance, its absolute magnitude is equivalent to 2.79. It belongs to the thin disk population of the Milky Way.

== Characteristics ==
It is an evolved F-type star that has left the main sequence and is now between a giant star and a subgiant, based on its spectral type of F6III-IVs. The star is 1.54 times more massive than the Sun and has expanded to 2 times its size. It is emitting six times the solar luminosity from its photosphere at an effective temperature of 6,400 K, which is around 630 degrees hotter than the Sun's photosphere. The age of HD 18262 is estimated at 1.64 billion years, equivalent to 36% of the Solar System's age. The star is metal-enriched compared to the Sun, the abundance of iron [Fe/H] on its surface is 2.3 higher than that of the Sun, while the oxygen abundance [O/H] is 2.9 times higher. (Note: from logarithms of 0.358 and 0.46 respectively.) Its B-V color index is 0.437, giving it the yellowish-white color of a F-type star.

The distance to HD 18262, based on information from the Gaia spacecraft, is of 43.79 parsecs (142.8 light-years). The apparent magnitude of the star is of 5.96^{m}, which is bright enough to be seen to the naked eye under dark sites, far away from light pollution. The absolute magnitude, i.e. its brightness if it was seen at a distance of 10 parsecs (32.6 ly), is of 2.79. HD 18262 is moving away from Earth at a velocity of 27.38 km/s. It is part of the thin disk population of the Milky Way. Its orbit around the galaxy has a low eccentricity of 0.06 and its distance from the galactic center varies from 7.14 to 8.11 kiloparsecs (23,280 to 26,440 light-years).

No debris disks have been detected around this star as of 2016 and no exoplanets have been detected around it as of 2012. A 2019 study analysed the possibility of HD 18262 hosting a giant planet, in five ensembles, analysing five different compositions. The highest possibity was in the second ensemble, where the planet would be formed by volatiles, lithophiles, and sderophiles. In this case, the possibility is of 23%. HD 18262's habitable zone is located at a mean distance of 2.44 astronomical units from it.
