= HD 4732 =

Star in the constellation Cetus

- Location of HD 4732 (circled in red)

Observation data Epoch J2000.0 Equinox ICRS
- Constellation: Cetus
- Right ascension: 00^{h} 49^{m} 13.95022^{s}
- Declination: −24° 08′ 11.9907″
- Apparent magnitude (V): 5.9

Characteristics
- Evolutionary stage: red giant branch
- Spectral type: K0III
- U−B color index: 0.72
- B−V color index: 0.95

Astrometry
| Radial velocity (R_{v}) | 24.81±0.12 km/s |
| Proper motion (μ) | RA: 81.165 mas/yr Dec.: –56.642 mas/yr |
| Parallax (π) | 18.1441±0.0422 mas |
| Distance | 179.8 ± 0.4 ly (55.1 ± 0.1 pc) |
| Absolute magnitude (M_{V}) | 2.09 |

Details
| Mass | 1.61 ± 0.05 M_{☉} |
| Radius | 5.1 ± 0.1 R_{☉} |
| Luminosity | 14.8 ± 0.2 L_{☉} |
| Surface gravity (log g) | 3.22 ± 0.03 cgs |
| Temperature | 4994 ± 32 K |
| Metallicity [Fe/H] | −0.01+0.05 −0.11 dex |
| Age | 2.3 ± 0.2 Gyr |

Other designations
- CD−24 345, HD 4732, HIP 3834, HR 228, SAO 166602, ADS 679, 2MASS J00491393-2408119

Database references
| SIMBAD | A |
- B
| Exoplanet Archive | data |

HD 4732 is a red giant star of magnitude 5.9 located in the constellation Cetus. It is 180 light-years from the Solar System.

The star is classified by some sources as a K-type giant and by others as a subgiant. It has an absolute magnitude of 2.09, and its radial velocity indicates that the star is moving away from the Solar System. There is a companion star about half the mass of the Sun at a separation of 8.77 arcseconds, corresponding to 481 AU.

== Observation ==
HD 4732 is located in the celestial Southern Hemisphere, although it can be observed from most regions of the Earth. Near Antarctica the star is circumpolar, while it is always below the horizon near the Arctic. Its magnitude of 5.9 places it at the limit of visibility to the naked eye, so observing this star with the naked eye is possible with a clear sky and no Moon.

The best time to observe this star in the evening sky falls in the months between September and February, and from both hemispheres the period of visibility remains approximately the same, thanks to the star's position not far from the celestial equator.

== Planetary system ==
In November 2012, a two-planet system was announced orbiting around this star from radial velocity measurements at Okayama Astrophysical Observatory and Australian Astronomical Observatory. The planetary system has two giant planets with identical minimum masses of 2.4 times that of Jupiter with orbital periods of 360 days and 2732 days. If the planets are coplanar and prograde, the true masses of the planets cannot exceed 28 times that of Jupiter based on dynamical stability analysis for the system. The planetary parameters were updated in 2023.

The planetary system of HD 4732 was found to be stable by a 2019 study.

The HD 4732 planetary system
| Companion (in order from star) | Mass | Semimajor axis (AU) | Orbital period (days) | Eccentricity | Inclination (°) | Radius |
|---|---|---|---|---|---|---|
| b | ≥1.986+0.156 −0.154 M_{J} | 1.129+0.001 −0.004 | 371.74+0.72 −1.86 | 0.266+0.081 −0.068 | — | — |
| c | ≥3.365+0.116 −0.269 M_{J} | 4.725±0.057 | 3184.20+58.12 −57.60 | 0.187+0.034 −0.066 | — | — |

== See also ==
- Okayama Planet Search Program
