= 25 Arietis =

Star in the constellation Cetus

Observation data Epoch J2000.0 Equinox ICRS
- Constellation: Cetus
- Right ascension: 02^{h} 27^{m} 23.38951^{s}
- Declination: +10° 11′ 53.9679″
- Apparent magnitude (V): 6.445

Characteristics
- Spectral type: F5 V
- B−V color index: 0.450±0.007

Astrometry
Radial velocity (R_{v})	−39.54±0.25 km/s
Proper motion (μ)	RA: −293.750 mas/yr Dec.: −203.157 mas/yr
Parallax (π)	27.3827±0.0412 mas
Distance	119.1 ± 0.2 ly (36.52 ± 0.05 pc)
Absolute magnitude (M_{V})	+3.60

Details
Mass	1.20 M_{☉}
Radius	1.41±0.05 R_{☉}
Luminosity	2.892+0.006 −0.007 L_{☉}
Surface gravity (log g)	4.22±0.10 cgs
Temperature	6,336±80 K
Metallicity [Fe/H]	−0.20±0.07 dex
Age	1.598 Gyr

Other designations
- BD+09°323, HD 15228, HIP 11427, SAO 110537

Database references
SIMBAD	data

25 Arietis is a star in the equatorial constellation of Cetus, near the modern constellation boundary with Aries for which it is named. 25 Arietis is the Flamsteed designation. It has an apparent visual magnitude of 6.45, placing it near the lower limit of visibility to the naked eye. The distance to this star can be estimated from its annual parallax shift of 27.38 mas, which yields a separation of 119 light-years. The star is moving closer to the Earth with a heliocentric radial velocity of −40 km/s, and is predicted to come as close as 102.8 light-years in 259,000 years. It has a relatively high proper motion, traversing the celestial sphere at the rate of 0.359″ per year.

This is an ordinary F-type main-sequence star with a stellar classification of F5 V. It is about 1.6 billion years old with an estimated 1.20 times the mass of the Sun and 1.41 times the Sun's radius. The star is radiating 2.9 times the Sun's luminosity from its photosphere at an effective temperature of around 6,336 K.
