= HD 2638 b =

Hot-Jupiter exoplanet orbiting the star HD 2638

Discovery
- Discovered by: Moutou, Mayor, Bouchy et al.
- Discovery site: Geneva
- Discovery date: 2005
- Detection method: Radial velocity

Orbital characteristics
- Semi-major axis: 0.044 AU (6,600,000 km)
- Eccentricity: 0
- Orbital period (sidereal): 3.4442 ± 0.0002 d
- Time of periastron: 2,453,323.206 ± 0.002
- Argument of periastron: 0
- Semi-amplitude: 67.4 ± 0.4
- Star: HD 2638

Physical characteristics
- Mass: >0.48 M_{J}

HD 2638 b is a planet of the star HD 2638. It is a typical "hot Jupiter", a planet that orbits its parent star in a very tight "torch orbit". The distance to the star is less than 1/20 Earth's distance from the Sun. One orbital revolution lasts only about three and half days.
