= HD 11964 b =

Extrasolar planet orbiting HD 11964

Discovery
- Discovered by: Butler et al.
- Discovery site: California, United States
- Discovery date: 7 August 2005
- Detection method: Doppler spectroscopy

Orbital characteristics
- Semi-major axis: 3.34 ± 0.4 AU (500,000,000 ± 60,000,000 km)
- Eccentricity: 0.06 ± 0.2
- Orbital period (sidereal): 2110 ± 70 d
- Time of periastron: 2,454,170 ± 380
- Semi-amplitude: 9.41 ± 0.39
- Star: HD 11964

HD 11964 b is an extrasolar planet, a gas giant like Jupiter approximately 110 light-years away in the constellation of Cetus. The planet orbits the yellow subgiant star HD 11964 in a nearly circular orbit, taking over 5 years to complete a revolution around the star at a distance of 3.34 astronomical units.

The planet was discovered in 2005 and published as part of the Catalog of Nearby Exoplanets, (or more like the Catalog of Far Away Exoplanets because all exoplanets are far away) under the designation HD 11964 b. However, since that time there has been confusion as to the designations of the planets in the HD 11964 system, leading to some sources designating this planet as "HD 11964 c". In a recent review of the properties of multi-planet extrasolar planetary systems, the discovery team has stated that the correct designation for this planet is HD 11964 b.
