= HD 1461 b =

Extrasolar planet in the constellation Cetus

Discovery
- Discovered by: Vogt et al.
- Discovery site: Keck Observatory; Anglo-Australian Observatory
- Discovery date: 2009-12-14
- Detection method: Radial velocity

Orbital characteristics
- Semi-major axis: 0.0634±0.0022 AU
- Eccentricity: <0.131
- Orbital period (sidereal): 5.77152±0.00045 d
- Semi-amplitude: 2.28±0.15
- Star: HD 1461

HD 1461 b is an extrasolar planet, orbiting the 6th magnitude G-type star HD 1461, 76.5 light years away in the constellation Cetus. This planet has a minimum mass 6.4 times that of Earth and orbits at a distance of 0.0634 AU with an eccentricity of less than 0.131. It is currently unknown whether the planet is a gas giant like Uranus or Neptune, or has a terrestrial composition like CoRoT-7b. This planet was announced on 13 December 2009 after it was discovered using radial velocity measurements taken at the Keck and Anglo-Australian Observatories.
