= HD 5319 b =

Extrasolar planet in the constellation Cetus

Discovery
- Discovered by: Robinson et al.
- Discovery site: California & Carnegie; Planet Search
- Discovery date: January 11, 2007
- Detection method: Doppler spectroscopy

Orbital characteristics
- Semi-major axis: 1.57±0.13 AU
- Eccentricity: 0.015±0.016
- Orbital period (sidereal): 638.6±1.2 d
- Time of periastron: 2463066±123
- Argument of periastron: 86±69
- Semi-amplitude: 31.45±0.82
- Star: HD 5319

HD 5319 b is a gas giant exoplanet discovered in 2007 in the constellation of Cetus. This planet has a minimum mass nearly two times that of Jupiter. The planet has an almost circular orbit, with an eccentricity of only 0.02 and a period of 641 days. An additional planet in the system was discovered in 2015 and may be in a 4:3 mean motion resonance with planet b.
