= Chi Ceti =

Triple star in the constellation Cetus

- Location of χ Ceti (circled in red)

Observation data Epoch J2000.0 Equinox ICRS
- Constellation: Cetus
- χ Ceti A
- Right ascension: 01^{h} 49^{m} 35.10277^{s}
- Declination: −10° 41′ 11.0719″
- Apparent magnitude (V): 4.66
- χ Ceti Ba
- Right ascension: 01^{h} 49^{m} 23.34886^{s}
- Declination: −10° 42′ 14.0839″
- Apparent magnitude (V): 6.75
- χ Ceti Bb
- Right ascension: 01^{h} 49^{m} 23.29444^{s}
- Declination: −10° 42′ 06.3471″

Characteristics

χ Ceti A
- Evolutionary stage: main sequence
- Spectral type: F3 III or F0 V
- U−B color index: +0.04
- B−V color index: +0.33

χ Ceti Ba
- Evolutionary stage: main sequence
- Spectral type: G3 V
- U−B color index: +0.12
- B−V color index: +0.61
- Variable type: BY Dra

Astrometry

χ Ceti A
Radial velocity (R_{v})	−1.8 km/s
Proper motion (μ)	RA: −147.867 mas/yr Dec.: −93.480 mas/yr
Parallax (π)	42.5848±0.1249 mas
Distance	76.6 ± 0.2 ly (23.48 ± 0.07 pc)
Absolute magnitude (M_{V})	+2.83±0.01

χ Ceti Ba
Radial velocity (R_{v})	−3.89±0.12 km/s
Proper motion (μ)	RA: −159.846 mas/yr Dec.: −70.666 mas/yr
Parallax (π)	41.8±0.2579 mas
Distance	78.0 ± 0.5 ly (23.9 ± 0.1 pc)
Absolute magnitude (M_{V})	4.98

χ Ceti Bb
Proper motion (μ)	RA: −151.993 mas/yr Dec.: −116.438 mas/yr
Parallax (π)	42.7901±0.0352 mas
Distance	76.22 ± 0.06 ly (23.37 ± 0.02 pc)

Details

χ Ceti A
Mass	1.26 M_{☉}
Radius	1.95 R_{☉}
Luminosity	5.6 L_{☉}
Surface gravity (log g)	3.96 cgs
Temperature	6,342 K
Metallicity [Fe/H]	−0.08 dex
Rotational velocity (v sin i)	54.7 km/s
Age	1.5 Gyr

χ Ceti Ba
Mass	1.03 M_{☉}
Radius	1.00 R_{☉}
Luminosity	0.98 L_{☉}
Surface gravity (log g)	4.53 cgs
Temperature	5,804 K
Metallicity [Fe/H]	−0.09 dex
Rotation	10 days
Rotational velocity (v sin i)	2.1 km/s
Age	1.1 Gyr

χ Ceti Bb
Mass	0.428±0.019 M_{☉}
Radius	0.429±0.017 R_{☉}
Luminosity	0.0090±0.0002 L_{☉}
Temperature	3,332±111 K

Other designations
- χ Cet, GJ 9061, ENG 8
- χ Ceti A: 53 Cet, BD−11°352, FK5 1051, HD 11171, HIP 8497, HR 531, SAO 148036
- χ Ceti B (Ba+Bb): EZ Cet, BD−11°351, HD 11131, HIP 8486, SAO 148033, WDS J01494-1042
- χ Ceti Bb: TIC 24910400, 2MASS J01492330-1042066

Database references
SIMBAD	χ Ceti
- χ Ceti A
- χ Ceti B

Chi Ceti is a triple star in the equatorial constellation of Cetus. The name is a Bayer designation that is Latinized from χ Ceti, and abbreviated Chi Cet or χ Cet. They appear to be common proper motion companions, sharing a similar motion through space. The brighter component, HD 11171, is visible to the naked eye with an apparent visual magnitude of 4.66, while the fainter companion, HD 11131, is magnitude 6.75. Both lie at roughly the same distance, with the brighter component lying at an estimated distance of 76.6 light years from the Sun based upon an annual parallax shift of 42.58 mas.

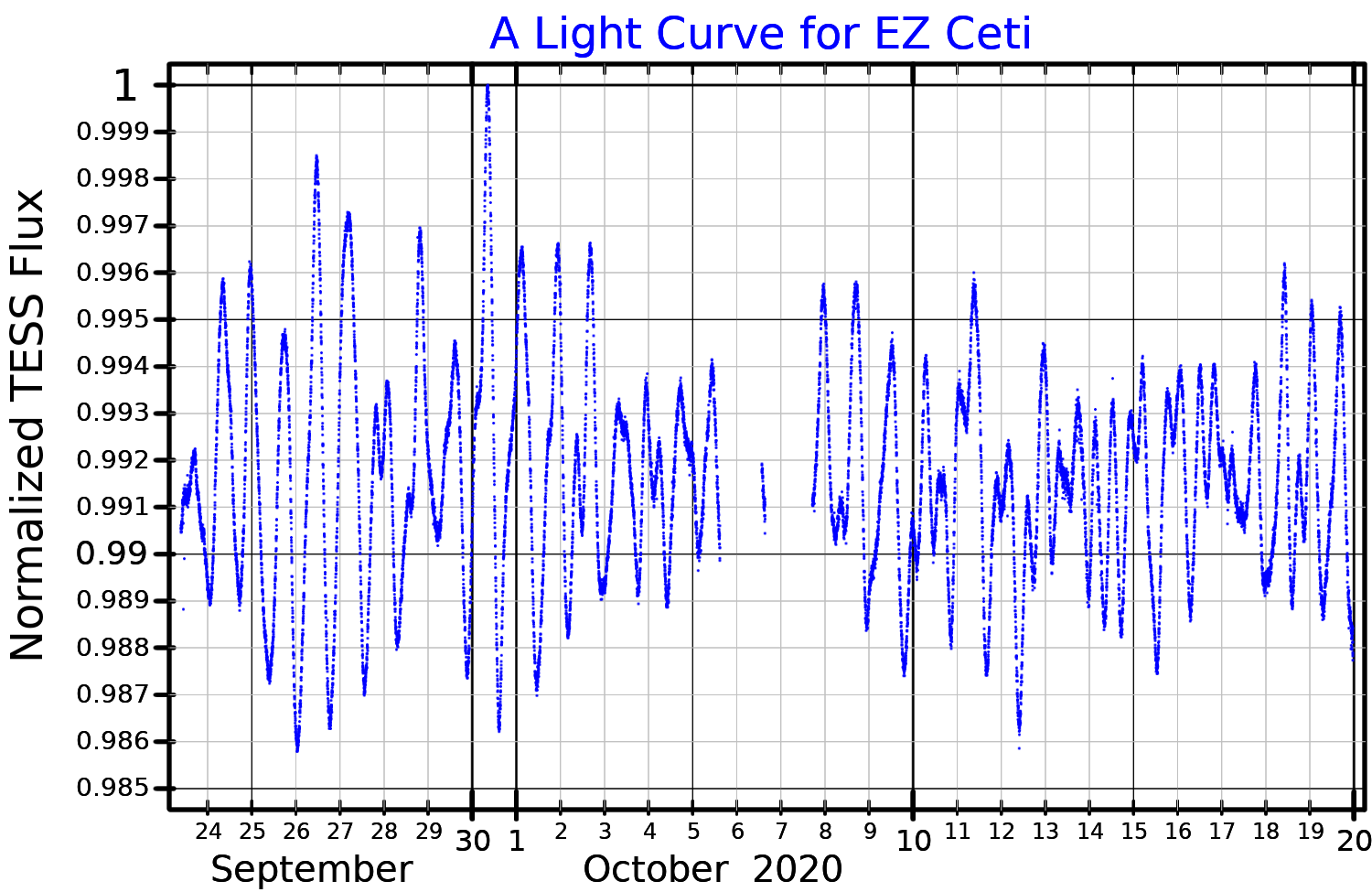
A light curve for EZ Ceti, plotted from TESS data

The primary, component A, is an evolved K-type giant star with a stellar classification of F3 III. However, Houk and Swift (1999) listed a classification of F0 V, which would match an F-type main sequence star. It displays an infrared excess at a wavelength of 70 μm and thus is a candidate host of an orbiting debris disk.

The secondary, component Ba, shares common proper motion companion with the primary. It is a G-type main sequence star with a classification of G3 V. It is a BY Draconis variable with a periodicity of 8.92 days and a variable-star designation of EZ Ceti.

The tertiary, component Bb, is a proper motion companion to Ba, separated by 6.72" from it. It is much smaller and fainter than either the primary of the secondary.
