= HD 7449 =

Binary star system in the constellation Cetus

Observation data Epoch J2000 Equinox ICRS
- Constellation: Cetus
- Right ascension: 01^{h} 14^{m} 29.32229^{s}
- Declination: −05° 02′ 50.6148″
- Apparent magnitude (V): 7.50

Characteristics
- Evolutionary stage: main sequence
- Spectral type: F9.5V + M4.5
- B−V color index: 0.575±0.007

Astrometry
Radial velocity (R_{v})	−19.60±0.13 km/s
Proper motion (μ)	RA: −164.544±0.039 mas/yr Dec.: −134.382±0.028 mas/yr
Parallax (π)	25.9132±0.0287 mas
Distance	125.9 ± 0.1 ly (38.59 ± 0.04 pc)
Absolute magnitude (M_{V})	4.55

Orbit
Primary	HD 7449 A
Secondary	HD 7449 B
Period (P)	175.310+43.633 −34.380 yr
Semi-major axis (a)	34.7+5.5 −4.8 AU
Eccentricity (e)	0.30+0.08 −0.10
Inclination (i)	68.4+4.1 −3.9°
Longitude of the node (Ω)	326+3 −2°
Periastron epoch (T)	2391480.709+12803.765 −15269.796
Argument of periastron (ω) (secondary)	201±13°
Semi-amplitude (K_{1}) (primary)	0.72+0.04 −0.03 km/s

Details

HD 7449 A
Mass	1.051+0.054 −0.055 M_{☉}
Radius	1.02±0.02 R_{☉}
Luminosity	1.26±0.02 L_{☉}
Surface gravity (log g)	4.44±0.02 cgs
Temperature	6060±42 K
Metallicity	−0.11±0.01
Age	2.2±1.3 Gyr

HD 7449 B
Mass	0.111+0.028 −0.020 M_{☉}
Temperature	3,000 K

Other designations
- BD−05 215, HD 7449, HIP 5806, TYC 4683-883-1, 2MASS J01142933-0502504

Database references
SIMBAD	data

HD 7449 is a binary star system about 126 light-years way. The primary star, HD 7449 A, is a main-sequence star belonging to the spectral class F9.5. It is younger than the Sun. The primary star is slightly depleted of heavy elements, having 80% of solar abundance.

== Companion ==
The stellar companion HD 7449 B, belonging to spectral class M4.5, was discovered in 2015. A survey in 2017 has failed to find additional stars with masses above 0.35M_{☉} in the system.

The most recent parameters for HD 7449 B as of 2022 come from a combination of data from radial velocity, astrometry, and imaging, showing that it is about 178 M_{J} (0.17 M_{☉}), and orbiting with a semi-major axis of about 34.7 AU and an orbital period of about 175 years.

== Planetary system ==
In 2011 one super-Jupiter-mass planet, HD 7449 Ab on a very eccentric orbit around HD 7449 A was discovered utilising the radial velocity method. A second, long-term radial velocity trend is present, and a second planet or brown dwarf has been proposed as the cause of this trend. However, in 2015 a low-mass stellar companion (HD 7449 B) was found, which is likely the cause of the long-term trend. The large eccentricity of the inner planet is likely caused by this stellar companion. In 2022, the inclination and true mass of HD 7449 Ab were measured via astrometry.

The HD 7449 A planetary system
Companion (in order from star)	Mass	Semimajor axis (AU)	Orbital period (years)	Eccentricity	Inclination (°)	Radius
b	8.174+3.055 −2.699 M_{J}	2.438+0.062 −0.063	3.479+0.029 −0.020	0.752+0.035 −0.032	171.631+2.609 −3.740	—
