= Phi4 Ceti =

Star in the constellation Cetus

Phi^{4} Ceti
- Location of φ^{4} Ceti (circled in red)

Observation data Epoch J2000.0 Equinox J2000.0 (ICRS)
- Constellation: Cetus
- Right ascension: 00^{h} 58^{m} 43.86805^{s}
- Declination: −11° 22′ 47.9107″
- Apparent magnitude (V): 5.61

Characteristics
- Evolutionary stage: Horizontal branch
- Spectral type: G8 III
- B−V color index: +0.94

Astrometry
Radial velocity (R_{v})	−19.32±0.13 km/s
Proper motion (μ)	RA: −32.898 mas/yr Dec.: −14.466 mas/yr
Parallax (π)	9.7501±0.0666 mas
Distance	335 ± 2 ly (102.6 ± 0.7 pc)
Absolute magnitude (M_{V})	0.696

Details
Mass	1.53±0.04 M_{☉}
Radius	10.972±0.224 R_{☉}
Luminosity	63.2±1.3 L_{☉}
Surface gravity (log g)	2.60±0.06 cgs
Temperature	4,914±50 K
Metallicity [Fe/H]	−0.17±0.03 dex
Rotational velocity (v sin i)	0.83±0.48 km/s
Age	2.20±0.04 Gyr

Other designations
- φ^{4} Cet, 23 Cet, BD−12°173, HD 5722, HIP 4587, HR 279, SAO 147546

Database references
SIMBAD	data

Phi^{4} Ceti is a solitary, orange-hued star in the equatorial constellation Cetus. It is faintly visible to the naked eye with an apparent visual magnitude of 5.61. Based upon an annual parallax shift of 9.75 mas as seen from Earth, it is located approximately 335 light-years (103 pc) from the Sun. At that distance, the visual magnitude of the star is diminished by an extinction factor of 0.10 due to interstellar dust, giving it an absolute magnitude of 0.70. It is drifting closer with a radial velocity of −19 km/s.

This is an evolved G-type giant star with a stellar classification of G8 III. At the estimated age of 2.2 billion years, is a red clump giant on the horizontal branch, which indicates it is generating energy through helium fusion at its core. The star has 1.53 times the mass of the Sun and has expanded to 11 times the Sun's radius. It is radiating 63 times the solar luminosity from its photosphere at an effective temperature of 4,914 K.
