= Phi3 Ceti =

Star in the constellation Cetus

Phi^{3} Ceti
- Location of φ^{3} Ceti (circled in red)

Observation data Epoch J2000.0 Equinox J2000.0 (ICRS)
- Constellation: Cetus
- Right ascension: 00^{h} 56^{m} 01.48867^{s}
- Declination: −11° 15′ 59.4988″
- Apparent magnitude (V): 5.31

Characteristics
- Spectral type: K5 III
- B−V color index: +1.52

Astrometry
Radial velocity (R_{v})	−25.48±0.38 km/s
Proper motion (μ)	RA: −27.758 mas/yr Dec.: −7.484 mas/yr
Parallax (π)	6.2394±0.107 mas
Distance	523 ± 9 ly (160 ± 3 pc)
Absolute magnitude (M_{V})	−0.78

Details
Mass	1.4 M_{☉}
Radius	44.33+0.76 −2.94 R_{☉}
Luminosity	441±21 L_{☉}
Surface gravity (log g)	1.67 cgs
Temperature	3,974+139 −34 K
Metallicity [Fe/H]	−0.31 dex
Rotational velocity (v sin i)	1.0 km/s

Other designations
- φ^{3} Ceti, 22 Cet, BD−12°162, HD 5437, HIP 4371, HR 267, SAO 147519

Database references
SIMBAD	data

Phi^{3} Ceti is a solitary, orange-hued star in the equatorial constellation of Cetus. It is faintly visible to the naked eye with an apparent visual magnitude of 5.31. Based upon an annual parallax shift of 6.24 mas as seen from Earth, it is located approximately 523 light-years (160 pc) from the Sun, give or take 9 light years. The star is drifting closer with a radial velocity of −25.5 km/s.

This is an evolved K-type giant star with a stellar classification of K5 III. It has about 1.4 times the mass and 44 times the radius of the Sun. The star radiates 441 times the solar luminosity from its photosphere at an effective temperature of 3,974 K.
