= Phi1 Ceti =

Star in the constellation Cetus

Phi^{1} Ceti
- Location of φ^{1} Ceti (circled in red)

Observation data Epoch J2000.0 Equinox J2000.0 (ICRS)
- Constellation: Cetus
- Right ascension: 00^{h} 44^{m} 11.400^{s}
- Declination: −10° 36′ 34.383″
- Apparent magnitude (V): 4.75

Characteristics
- Evolutionary stage: red clump
- Spectral type: K0 III
- U−B color index: +0.83
- B−V color index: +1.00
- Variable type: suspected

Astrometry
Radial velocity (R_{v})	+0.33±0.63 km/s
Proper motion (μ)	RA: −9.323 mas/yr Dec.: −113.192 mas/yr
Parallax (π)	15.1265±0.1043 mas
Distance	216 ± 1 ly (66.1 ± 0.5 pc)
Absolute magnitude (M_{V})	0.732

Details
Mass	1.60 M_{☉}
Radius	11 R_{☉}
Luminosity	54 L_{☉}
Surface gravity (log g)	2.7 cgs
Temperature	4,775±5 K
Metallicity [Fe/H]	−0.16 dex
Rotational velocity (v sin i)	2.3 km/s
Age	2.21 Gyr

Other designations
- φ^{1} Cet, 17 Ceti, NSV 278, BD−11°128, FK5 2048, HD 4188, HIP 3455, HR 194, SAO 147423

Database references
SIMBAD	data

Phi^{1} Ceti is a single star located in the equatorial constellation of Cetus. It is visible to the naked eye with an apparent visual magnitude of +4.78. Based upon an annual parallax shift of 15.1 mas, it is located about 216 light-years (66 pc) from the Sun. Based upon the motion of this star through space, Phi^{1} Ceti is a probable member of the proposed Wolf 630 moving group. This is a set of stars centered on Wolf 630 that are moving nearly in parallel and have an age of around 2.7±0.5 billion years. They may be former members of a dissolved open cluster.

At an age of about 2.21 billion years, Phi^{1} Ceti is an evolved red clump giant star with a stellar classification of K0 III. It is presently on the horizontal branch and is generating energy through the nuclear fusion of helium at its core. The star is suspected of variability; it has been measured to vary between magnitudes 4.75 and 4.78. It has 1.6 times the mass of the Sun and has expanded to 11 times the Sun's radius. The star is radiating 54 times the luminosity of the Sun from its enlarged photosphere at an effective temperature of 4,775 K.
