= Phi2 Ceti =

Star in the constellation Cetus

φ^{2} Ceti
- Location of φ^{2} Ceti (circled in red)

Observation data Epoch J2000 Equinox ICRS
- Constellation: Cetus
- Right ascension: 00^{h} 50^{m} 07.58896^{s}
- Declination: −10° 38′ 39.5839″
- Apparent magnitude (V): 5.172

Characteristics
- Evolutionary stage: main sequence
- Spectral type: F7V
- U−B color index: +0.009
- B−V color index: +0.518

Astrometry
Radial velocity (R_{v})	+8.21±0.12 km/s
Proper motion (μ)	RA: −228.031 mas/yr Dec.: −229.577 mas/yr
Parallax (π)	62.8022±0.0951 mas
Distance	51.93 ± 0.08 ly (15.92 ± 0.02 pc)
Absolute magnitude (M_{V})	4.23

Details
Mass	1.19 M_{☉}
Radius	1.17+0.03 −0.01 R_{☉}
Luminosity	1.852+0.006 −0.007 L_{☉}
Surface gravity (log g)	4.45 cgs
Temperature	6,352 K
Metallicity [Fe/H]	−0.03 dex
Rotational velocity (v sin i)	4.3 km/s
Age	1.9 Gyr

Other designations
- φ^{2} Cet, 19 Cet, NSV 316, BD−11°153, GJ 37, HD 4813, HIP 3909, HR 235, SAO 147470

Database references
SIMBAD	data

Phi^{2} Ceti is a star located in the equatorial constellation of Cetus. Its name is a Bayer designation that is Latinized from Phi^{2} Ceti, and abbreviated Phi^{2} Cet or φ^{2} Cet. This star is also known as 19 Ceti, and HD 4813. Based upon parallax measurements, it is located about 52 light years away from the Sun. It has an apparent visual magnitude of +5.19, making it bright enough to be seen with the naked eye. The star is drifting further away with a radial velocity of +8 km/s.

This is an ordinary F-type main sequence star with a stellar classification of F7V. The star is estimated to be 1.9 billion years old and is spinning with a projected rotational velocity of 4.3 km/s. It has 1.2 times the mass and 1.17 times the radius of the Sun. The star is radiating 1.85 times the luminosity of the Sun from its photosphere at an effective temperature of 6,352 K. It is a suspected variable star of unknown type, with a brightness that has been measured ranging from magnitude 5.15 down to 5.24.
