= HD 11506 =

Star in the constellation Cetus

Observation data Epoch J2000.0 Equinox ICRS
- Constellation: Cetus
- Right ascension: 01^{h} 52^{m} 50.53442^{s}
- Declination: −19° 30′ 25.1082″
- Apparent magnitude (V): 7.51

Characteristics
- Evolutionary stage: subgiant
- Spectral type: G0V
- B−V color index: 0.607±0.015

Astrometry
Radial velocity (R_{v})	−7.53±0.13 km/s
Proper motion (μ)	RA: 22.039(22) mas/yr Dec.: −97.904(16) mas/yr
Parallax (π)	19.5342±0.0221 mas
Distance	167.0 ± 0.2 ly (51.19 ± 0.06 pc)
Absolute magnitude (M_{V})	3.94

Details
Mass	1.22±0.02 M_{☉}
Radius	1.35 R_{☉}
Luminosity	2.17 L_{☉}
Surface gravity (log g)	4.23 cgs
Temperature	6,030 K
Metallicity [Fe/H]	+0.30±0.06 dex
Rotation	~15 days
Rotational velocity (v sin i)	5.5±0.5 km/s
Age	1.6±0.9 Gyr

Other designations
- BD−20°358, HD 11506, HIP 8770, SAO 148079

Database references
SIMBAD	data
Exoplanet Archive	data

HD 11506 is a star in the equatorial constellation of Cetus. It has a yellow hue and can be viewed with a small telescope but is too faint to be visible to the naked eye, having an apparent visual magnitude of 7.51. The distance to this object is 167 light-years based on parallax, but it is drifting closer to the Sun with a radial velocity of −7.5 km/s. It has an absolute magnitude of 3.94.

This object is an ordinary G-type main-sequence star with a stellar classification of G0V, which indicates it is generating energy via hydrogen fusion at its core. It is around 1.6 billion years old and is spinning with a projected rotational velocity of 5 km/s. The star has 122% of the mass of the Sun and 135% of the Sun's radius. The spectrum shows a higher than solar abundance of elements other than hydrogen and helium – what astronomers term the metallicity. The star is radiating twice the Sun's luminosity from its photosphere at an effective temperature of 6,030 K.

== Planetary system ==
The superjovian planet HD 11506 b was discovered orbiting the star by the N2K Consortium in 2007 using the Doppler spectroscopy method. In 2009, a second planet discovery was claimed based on Bayesian analysis of the original data. However, in 2015 additional radial velocity measurements showed that the planetary parameters were significantly different than those determined by Bayesian analysis. An additional linear trend in the radial velocities indicated a stellar or planetary companion on a long term orbit.

In 2022, the presence of a third planet was confirmed, and the mass and inclination of both planet b and the new planet d were measured via astrometry. A 2024 study also confirmed HD 11506 d, but found a significantly wider orbit and greater mass than previously estimated. This object orbits with a 73-year period, and at about 13 times the mass of Jupiter, it is at the borderline of being a brown dwarf.

The HD 11506 planetary system
Companion (in order from star)	Mass	Semimajor axis (AU)	Orbital period (days)	Eccentricity	Inclination (°)	Radius
c	≥0.40±0.02 M_{J}	0.771±0.004	223.92±0.37	0.228±0.054	—	—
b	4.80±0.08 M_{J}	2.885±0.016	1,617.7±1.9	0.379±0.009	113+23 −53	—
d	12.8+0.6 −0.5 M_{J}	18.20+0.06 −0.09	26,517+256 −292	0.29+0.02 −0.03	90+6 −5	—
