= Lists of planets =

These are lists of planets. A planet is a large, rounded astronomical body that is neither a star nor its remnant. The most accepted available theory of planet formation is the nebular hypothesis, which posits that an interstellar cloud collapses out of a nebula to create a young protostar orbited by a protoplanetary disk. There are eight planets within the Solar System; planets outside of the solar system are also known as exoplanets.

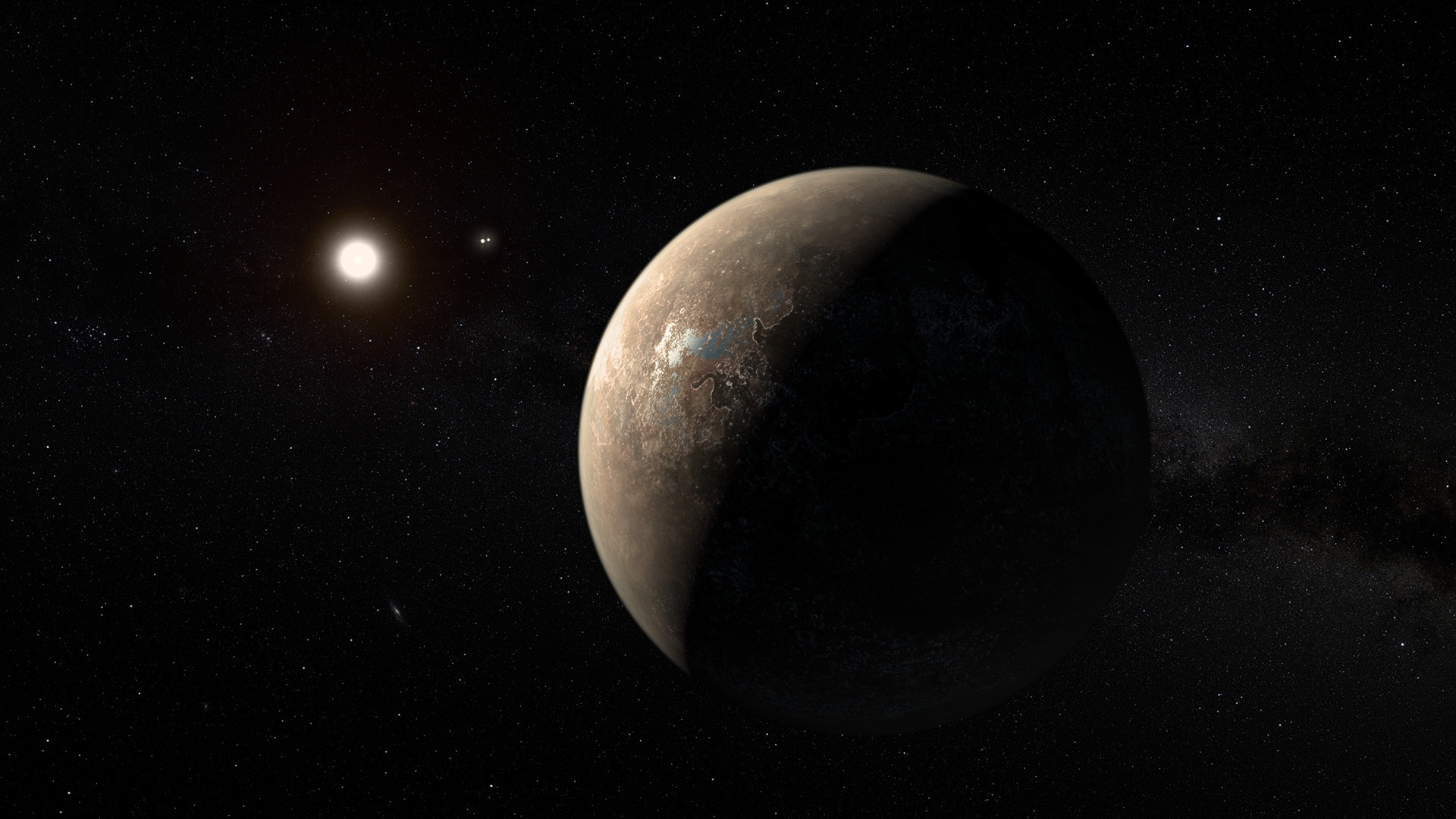
Artist's impression of the potentially habitable exoplanet Proxima Centauri b

As of 5 November 2026, there are 6,464 confirmed exoplanets in 4,849 planetary systems, with 1,074 systems having more than one planet. There are an additional 1,977 potential exoplanets from the Kepler space telescope's first mission yet to be confirmed, as well as 975 from its "Second Light" mission and 4,815 from the Transiting Exoplanet Survey Satellite (TESS) mission.

- Transit: 4,797 (74.2%)
- Radial velocity: 1,205 (18.6%)
- Microlensing: 292 (4.5%)
- Direct imaging: 98 (1.5%)
- Transit-timing variation: 29 (0.4%)
- Eclipse timing variation: 17 (0.3%)
- Orbital brightness modulation: 9 (0.1%)
- Pulsar timing variation: 8 (0.1%)
- Astrometry: 6 (0.1%)
- Pulsation timing variation: 2 (0.0%)
- Disk kinematics: 1 (0.0%)
Observation method for confirmed exoplanets

== In the Solar System ==
- For a list of geophysical planets in the Solar System, see: List of gravitationally rounded objects of the Solar System. This also includes a list of the eight planets according to the IAU definition.
- For a list of objects in the Solar System once but no longer officially considered planets, see: List of former planets
- For a list of objects in the Solar System, including planets, that have been or are believed to exist, but either have not been proven or have been disproven, see: List of hypothetical Solar System objects

== Outside the Solar System ==
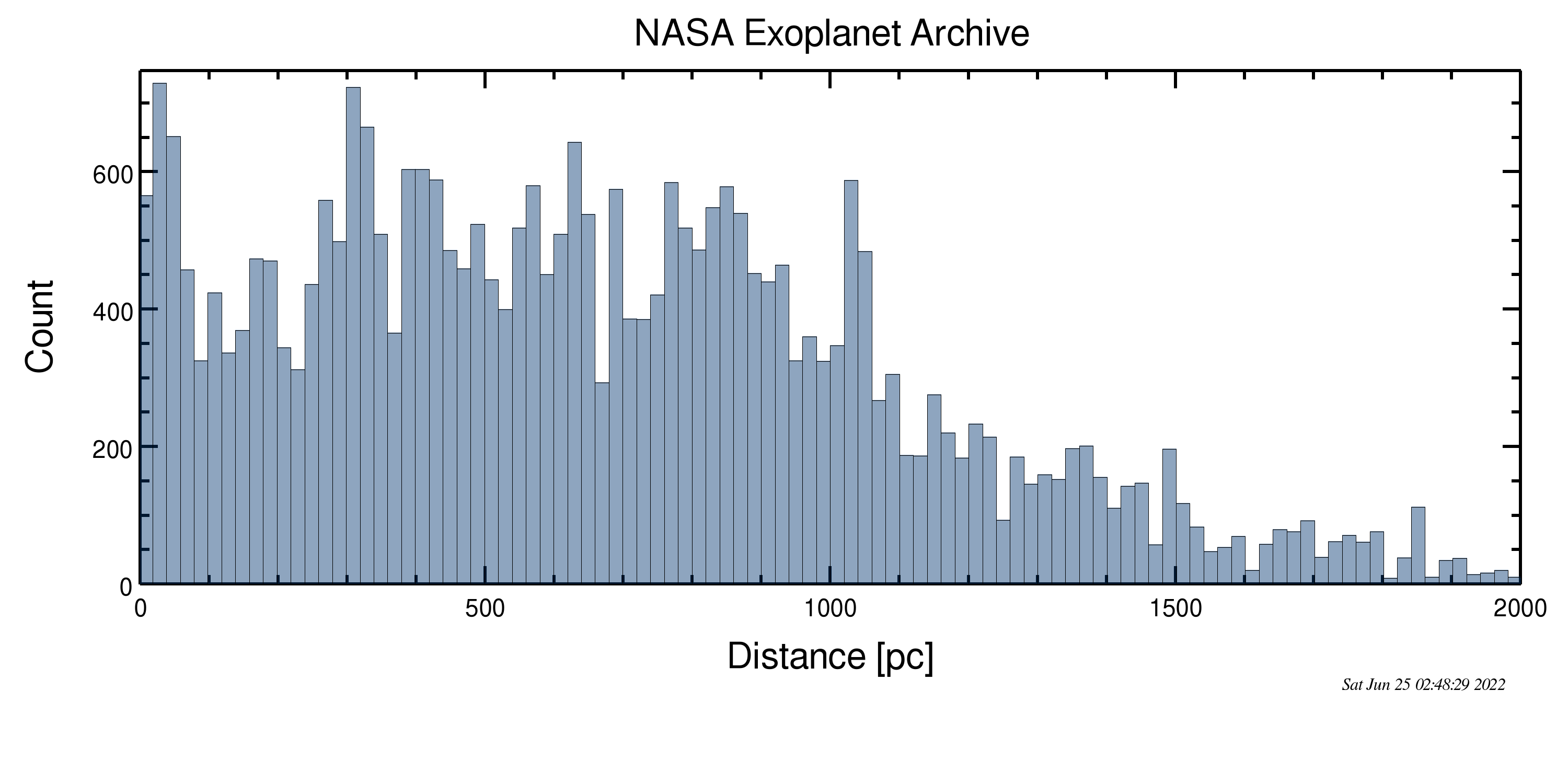
Distribution of confirmed exoplanets with respect to distance from the Sun

- List of directly imaged exoplanets
- List of exoplanet extremes
- List of exoplanet firsts
- List of exoplanets discovered by the Kepler space telescope
- List of exoplanets observed during Kepler's K2 mission
- List of exoplanets discovered by the TESS mission
- List of terrestrial exoplanet candidates for atmosphere detection
- List of hottest exoplanets
- List of coldest exoplanets
- List of multiplanetary systems
- List of circumbinary planets
- List of nearest exoplanets
- List of nearest terrestrial exoplanet candidates
- List of potentially habitable exoplanets
- List of proper names of exoplanets
- List of largest exoplanets
- List of smallest exoplanets
- List of transiting exoplanets
- List of exoplanets and planetary debris around giant stars
- List of exoplanets and planetary debris around white dwarfs
- List of extrasolar planetary collisions

=== Lists of exoplanets by year of discovery ===
- List of exoplanets discovered before 2000 (31)
- List of exoplanets discovered between 2000–2009 (376)
- List of exoplanets discovered in 2010 (109)
- List of exoplanets discovered in 2011 (178)
- List of exoplanets discovered in 2012 (149)
- List of exoplanets discovered in 2013 (149)
- List of exoplanets discovered in 2014 (869)
- List of exoplanets discovered in 2015 (144)
- List of exoplanets discovered in 2016 (1497)
- List of exoplanets discovered in 2017 (152)
- List of exoplanets discovered in 2018 (300)
- List of exoplanets discovered in 2019 (169)
- List of exoplanets discovered in 2020 (256)
- List of exoplanets discovered in 2021 (253)
- List of exoplanets discovered in 2022 (312)
- List of exoplanets discovered in 2023 (304)
- List of exoplanets discovered in 2024 (284)
- List of exoplanets discovered in 2025 (239)
- List of exoplanets discovered in 2026 (351)

Extrasolar systems

- List of multiplanetary systems
- List of exoplanets discovered using the Kepler space telescope
- List of stars with proplyds
- List of rogue planets

Exoplanets by method of detection

- List of exoplanets detected by radial velocity
- List of transiting exoplanets
- List of exoplanets detected by microlensing
- List of exoplanets discovered via astrometry
- List of directly imaged exoplanets
- List of exoplanets detected by timing

Records in exoplanet detection

- List of exoplanet extremes
- List of exoplanet firsts

Potential terrestrial exoplanets

- List of nearest terrestrial exoplanet candidates
- List of potentially habitable exoplanets

== Fictional or non-scientific planets ==
- For a list of planets as used in astrology, see: Planets in astrology
- For a list of supposed planets not based on scientific evidence, see: Planetary objects proposed in religion, astrology, ufology and pseudoscience
- For lists of planets in fiction, see: Fictional planets of the Solar System, Extrasolar planets in fiction § List, and List of Star Wars planets and moons

== Mixed ==
- List of planet types (etymologically accepting of multiple categories)

== See also ==
- Lists of astronomical objects
- Classical planet
- Definition of planet
- List of exoplanet search projects
