= Lambda Ceti =

Star in the constellation Cetus

- Location of Lambda Ceti (circled)

Observation data Epoch J2000 Equinox ICRS
- Constellation: Cetus
- Right ascension: 02^{h} 59^{m} 42.893^{s}
- Declination: +08° 54′ 26.589″
- Apparent magnitude (V): 4.71

Characteristics
- Spectral type: B6III
- U−B color index: −0.471
- B−V color index: −0.109±0.006

Astrometry
Radial velocity (R_{v})	10.2±2.8 km/s
Proper motion (μ)	RA: 8.382 mas/yr Dec.: −16.385 mas/yr
Parallax (π)	7.3207±0.1451 mas
Distance	446 ± 9 ly (137 ± 3 pc)
Absolute magnitude (M_{V})	−1.52

Details
Mass	5.01±0.05 M_{☉}
Radius	5.4 R_{☉}
Luminosity	652 L_{☉}
Temperature	13,940±710 K
Rotational velocity (v sin i)	131 km/s
Age	100-125 Myr

Other designations
- Menkar, λ Cet, 91 Cet, BD+08°455, FK5 1083, HD 18604, HIP 13954, HR 896, SAO 110889

Database references
SIMBAD	data

Lambda Ceti is a star in the equatorial constellation of Cetus. Its name is a Bayer designation that is Latinized from λ Ceti, and abbreviated Lambda Cet or λ Cet. Historically, the star bore the traditional name Menkar, although today that name is more commonly associated with α Ceti. With an apparent visual magnitude of 4.71, it is faintly visible to the naked eye. Based on parallax measurement of 7.32 mas as seen from Earth, it is located at a distance of approximately 446 light-years (137 pc) from the Sun. The star is drifting further away with a line of sight velocity component of 10 km/s.

This star, along with α Cet (Menkar), γ Cet (Kaffaljidhma), δ Cet, μ Cet, ξ^{1} Cet and ξ^{2} Cet were Al Kaff al Jidhmah, "the Part of a Hand".

In Chinese, 天囷 (Tiān Qūn), meaning Circular Celestial Granary, refers to an asterism consisting of λ Ceti, α Ceti, κ^{1} Ceti, μ Ceti, ξ^{1} Ceti, ξ^{2} Ceti, ν Ceti, γ Ceti, δ Ceti, 75 Ceti, 70 Ceti, 63 Ceti and 66 Ceti. Consequently, the Chinese name for λ Ceti itself is 天囷三 (Tiān Qūn sān, English: the Third Star of Circular Celestial Granary.)

Lambda Ceti is a blue giant star with stellar classification B6III. It is an estimated 100-125 million years old, and is spinning rapidly with a projected rotational velocity of 131 km/s. It has five times the mass of the Sun and 5.4 times the Sun's radius. The star is radiating 920 times the Sun's luminosity at an effective temperature of 13,940 K.
