= Xi Ceti =

The Bayer designation Xi Ceti (ξ Cet / ξ Ceti) is shared by two star systems, in the constellation Cetus:

- ξ^{1} Ceti
- ξ^{2} Ceti

All of them were member of asterism 天囷 (Tiān Qūn), Circular Celestial Granary, Stomach mansion.
