= Nu Ceti =

Binary star system in the constellation Cetus

- Location of ν Ceti (circled)

Observation data Epoch J2000.0 Equinox J2000.0
- Constellation: Cetus
- Right ascension: 02^{h} 35^{m} 52.473^{s}
- Declination: +05° 35′ 35.69″
- Apparent magnitude (V): 4.86 + 9.08 (visual companion)

Characteristics
- Spectral type: G8III + F7V (visual companion)
- U−B color index: 0.52
- B−V color index: 0.88

Astrometry
| Radial velocity (R_{v}) | 4.81±0.02 km/s |
| Proper motion (μ) | RA: −26.51±0.25 mas/yr Dec.: −22.32±0.22 mas/yr |
| Parallax (π) | 9.59±0.23 mas |
| Distance | 340 ± 8 ly (104 ± 3 pc) |
| Absolute magnitude (M_{V}) | −0.415 |

Orbit
| Primary | ν Ceti A |
| Period (P) | 714.48±0.15 days |
| Eccentricity (e) | 0.274±0.005 |
| Periastron epoch (T) | 53364.9±1.9 |
| Argument of periastron (ω) (secondary) | 119.5±1.1° |
| Semi-amplitude (K_{1}) (primary) | 5.09±0.03 km/s |

Details

Aa
| Mass | 2.65 M_{☉} |
| Radius | 15.87+1.06 −2.19 R_{☉} |
| Luminosity | 161.4±7.9 L_{☉} |
| Surface gravity (log g) | 2.56 cgs |
| Temperature | 5,164+417 −164 K |
| Age | 537 Myr |

B
| Mass | 1.124 M_{☉} |
| Radius | 1.075 R_{☉} |
| Luminosity | 1.421 L_{☉} |
| Surface gravity (log g) | 4.36 cgs |
| Temperature | 6,077 K |
| Age | 1.3 Gyr |

Other designations
- Struve 281, 78 Ceti, BD+04°418, HD 16161, HIP 12093, HR 754, SAO 110635, WDS J02359+0536

Database references
| SIMBAD | data |

Nu Ceti is a binary star system in the equatorial constellation of Cetus. Its name is a Bayer designation that is Latinized from ν Ceti, and abbreviated ν Ceti or ν Cet. This system is visible to the naked eye as a faint point of light with a combined apparent visual magnitude of 4.86. It is located approximately 340 light years distant from the Sun, based on parallax measurements, and is drifting further away with a radial velocity of 4.8 km/s. Nu Ceti is believed to be part of the Ursa Major stream of co-moving stars.

In Chinese, 天囷 (Tiān Qūn), meaning Circular Celestial Granary, refers to an asterism consisting of α Ceti, κ^{1} Ceti, λ Ceti, μ Ceti, ξ^{1} Ceti, ξ^{2} Ceti, ν Ceti, γ Ceti, δ Ceti, 75 Ceti, 70 Ceti, 63 Ceti and 66 Ceti. Consequently, the Chinese name for ν Ceti itself is "the Seventh Star of Circular Celestial Granary", Tiān Qūn Qī.

The primary, designated component A, forms a single-lined spectroscopic binary with an orbital period of 1.96 years and an eccentricity of 0.27. The visible component is a G-type giant star, currently on the horizontal branch, with a stellar classification of G8III. In addition to the spectroscopic companion there is a visual companion star which shares a common proper motion with Nu Ceti A, designated component B; an F-type main-sequence star with a class of F7V and a 9.08 apparent visual magnitude located 8.0 arcsec away. It was discovered by Struve.
