= 75 Ceti =

Star in the constellation Cetus

- Location of 75 Ceti (circled in red)

Observation data Epoch J2000.0 Equinox ICRS
- Constellation: Cetus
- Right ascension: 02^{h} 32^{m} 09.42241^{s}
- Declination: −01° 02′ 05.6166″
- Apparent magnitude (V): +5.36

Characteristics
- Evolutionary stage: red clump
- Spectral type: K1 III or G3 III
- B−V color index: +1.004±0.002

Astrometry
Radial velocity (R_{v})	−6.34±0.13 km/s
Proper motion (μ)	RA: −23.268 mas/yr Dec.: −30.987 mas/yr
Parallax (π)	12.1717±0.0962 mas
Distance	268 ± 2 ly (82.2 ± 0.6 pc)
Absolute magnitude (M_{V})	0.808

Details
Mass	1.92+0.07 −0.08 M_{☉}
Radius	10.57+0.17 −0.16 R_{☉}
Luminosity	51.8+1.5 −2.5 L_{☉}
Surface gravity (log g)	2.67±0.04 cgs
Temperature	4,830±20 K
Metallicity [Fe/H]	+0.10+0.08 −0.05 dex
Rotational velocity (v sin i)	3.2±0.5 km/s
Age	1.41±0.01 Gyr

Other designations
- 75 Cet, BD−01°353, GC 3043, HD 15779, HIP 11791, HR 739, SAO 129959

Database references
SIMBAD	data
Exoplanet Archive	data

75 Ceti is a star in the equatorial constellation of Cetus with at least two planets. It is visible to the naked eye as a dim, orange-hued star with an apparent visual magnitude of +5.36. The star is located 268 light-years (82 parsecs) distant from the Sun, based on parallax, but is drifting closer with a radial velocity of −6 km/s.

In Chinese, 天囷 (Tiān Qūn), meaning Circular Celestial Granary, refers to an asterism consisting of α Ceti, κ^{1} Ceti, λ Ceti, μ Ceti, ξ^{1} Ceti, ξ^{2} Ceti, ν Ceti, γ Ceti, δ Ceti, 75 Ceti, 70 Ceti, 63 Ceti and 66 Ceti. Consequently, 75 Ceti itself is known as the Tenth Star of Circular Celestial Granary.

This is an aging giant star with a stellar classification of K1 III, having exhausted the supply of hydrogen at its core and expanded to 10.6 times the Sun's radius, or 0.05 AU. It is a red clump giant, which indicates it is on the horizontal branch and is generating energy through helium fusion at the core. The star is 1.4 billion years old with 1.9 times the Sun's mass. It is radiating 56 times the luminosity of the Sun from its swollen photosphere at an effective temperature of 4,846 K. There is a companion star just over half the Sun's mass at a separation of 11.5 arcseconds, corresponding to 958 AU.

== Planetary system ==
A planetary companion was discovered by Doppler measurements at the Okayama Astrophysical Observatory, and announced in 2012. The planet's discoverers consider the planet, designated 75 Ceti b, to be "typical" of gas giants. Note that (like many recorded planets) b takes in much more insolation than does Jupiter and, indeed, Earth.

There may be additional periodic factors in the data, corresponding to m sin i of around 0.4 M_{J} and 1 M_{J}, at distances of ~0.9 AU and ~4 AU, where i is the orbital inclination and m is the planet's actual mass. In 2023, the presence of a second, Jupiter-mass planet orbiting at 4 AU (75 Ceti c) was confirmed, which is more irradiated than Earth as well. The shorter period signal corresponding to a possible planet at 0.9 AU was found to be an alias of the true period of planet c.

The 75 Ceti planetary system
Companion (in order from star)	Mass	Semimajor axis (AU)	Orbital period (days)	Eccentricity	Inclination (°)	Radius
b	≥2.479+0.074 −0.090 M_{J}	1.912+0.002 −0.003	696.62+1.33 −1.69	0.093+0.026 −0.042	—	—
c	≥0.912+0.088 −0.143 M_{J}	3.929+0.058 −0.052	2051.62+45.98 −40.47	0.023+0.191 −0.003	—	—
