= Mu Ceti =

Binary star in the constellation Cetus

μ Ceti
- Location of μ Ceti (circled)

Observation data Epoch J2000.0 Equinox ICRS
- Constellation: Cetus
- Right ascension: 02^{h} 44^{m} 56.53735^{s}
- Declination: +10° 06′ 50.9217″
- Apparent magnitude (V): +4.27 (4.30 + 7.80)

Characteristics
- Evolutionary stage: Main sequence
- Spectral type: A9IIIp + K0.5V
- Variable type: Gamma Doradus

Astrometry
Radial velocity (R_{v})	+29.53±0.28 km/s
Proper motion (μ)	RA: +278.641 mas/yr Dec.: −41.222 mas/yr
Parallax (π)	37.5924±0.2440 mas
Distance	86.8 ± 0.6 ly (26.6 ± 0.2 pc)
Absolute magnitude (M_{V})	+2.17

Orbit
Primary	A
Name	B
Period (P)	33.62±0.03 yr
Semi-major axis (a)	0.5259±0.0026″
Eccentricity (e)	0.9219±0.0006
Inclination (i)	95.5±0.4°
Longitude of the node (Ω)	59.18±0.06°
Periastron epoch (T)	2019.33 yr
Argument of periastron (ω) (secondary)	78.26±0.01°

Details

A
Mass	1.66±0.04 M_{☉}
Radius	2.07±0.11 R_{☉}
Luminosity	10.1±0.4 L_{☉}
Surface gravity (log g)	3.92±0.23 cgs
Temperature	7,380±180 K
Metallicity	$\begin{smallmatrix}\left[\ce{M}/\ce{H}\right]\end{smallmatrix}$ = 0.06±0.03
Rotational velocity (v sin i)	45.1±2.3 km/s
Age	1.20+0.18 −0.16 Gyr

B
Mass	0.80±0.10 M_{☉}
Radius	0.80±0.15 R_{☉}
Temperature	5,250 K

Other designations
- μ Ceti, 87 Ceti, BD+09°359, HD 17094, HIP 12828, HR 813, SAO 110723, WDS J02449+1007

Database references
SIMBAD	data

Mu Ceti is a binary star system in the constellation Cetus, the whale. Its name is a Bayer designation that is Latinized from μ Ceti, and abbreviated μ Cet or μ Cet. The combined apparent magnitude of the system is +4.27, making it visible to the naked eye as a faint star from skies with low or no luminous pollution. Based upon parallax measurements taken by the Gaia spacecraft, it is located at a distance of 87 light-years (27 pc). It is drifting further away with a line of sight velocity component of +29.5 km/s.

The location of Mu Ceti next to the ecliptic make it subject to lunar occultations.

== Nomenclature ==
Mu Ceti is the system's Bayer designation. It has no official proper name.

In Chinese, 天囷 (Tiān Qūn), meaning Circular Celestial Granary, refers to an asterism consisting of α Ceti, κ^{1} Ceti, λ Ceti, μ Ceti, ξ^{1} Ceti, ξ^{2} Ceti, ν Ceti, γ Ceti, δ Ceti, 75 Ceti, 70 Ceti, 63 Ceti and 66 Ceti. Consequently, the Chinese name for Mu Ceti itself is "the Fourth Star of Circular Celestial Granary".

== Characteristics ==
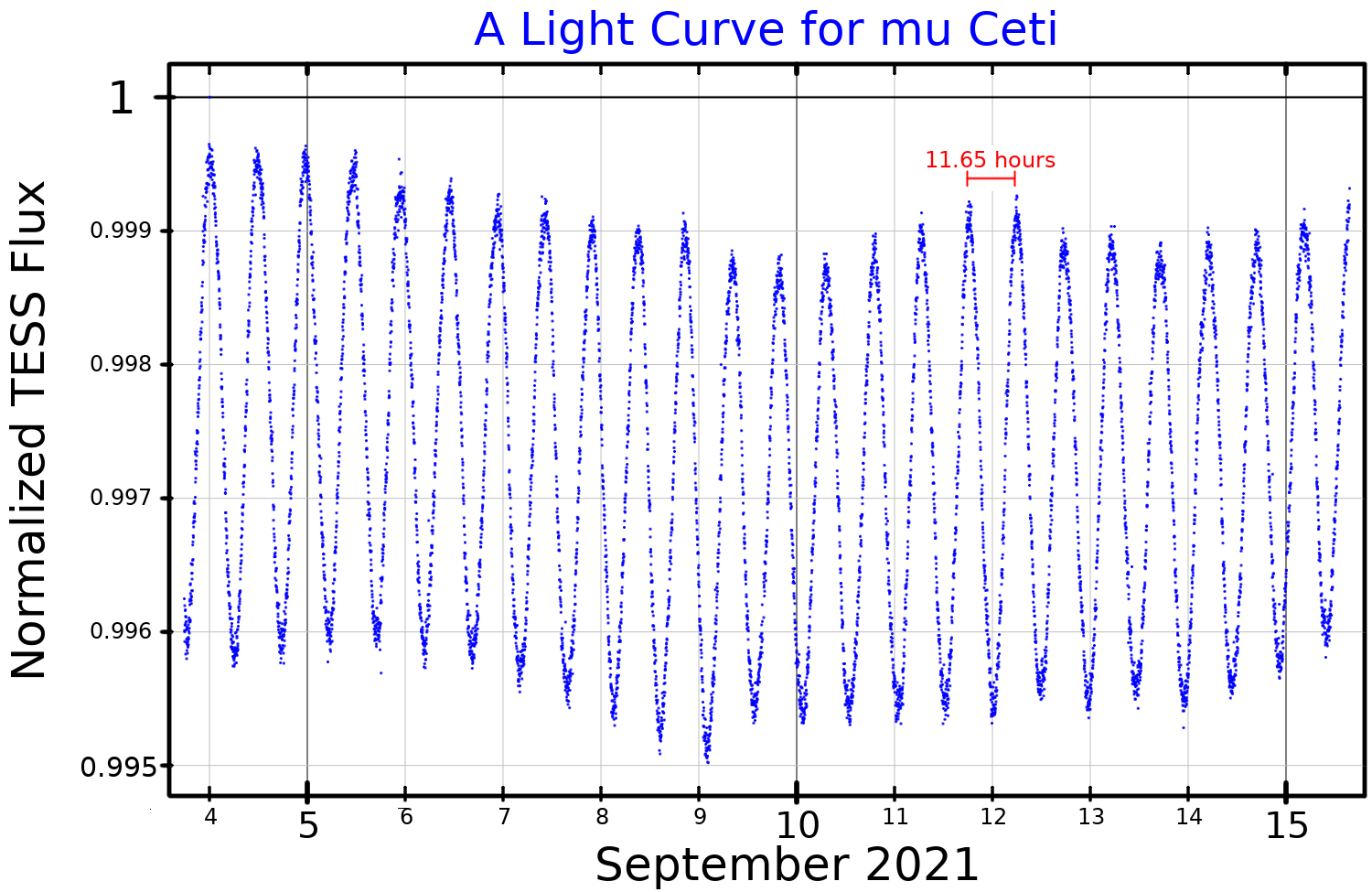
A light curve for Mu Ceti plotted from TESS data

Mu Ceti is a spectroscopic binary. These systems have binarity inferred from variations in their spectral lines, which shift from redder to bluer (gravitational redshift) across the orbit. It has also been resolved by speckle interferometry. The energy output is dominated by the main star, which is 25 times brighter than the companion. (Note: Inferred from magnitude differences. The equation is: $\sqrt[5]{100}$^{$(7.8-4.3)$} ≈ 25.) They share a highly eccentric orbit, are viewed orbiting nearly edge-on, and take 34 years to complete an orbit.

The main component (apparent magnitude 4.30) has an spectral class A9IIIp, suggesting it is a late-type giant star and is chemically peculiar. Its physical properties, however, do not support this evolutionary stage and the peculiar class, Mu Ceti is instead in the late main sequence, about to become a subgiant. This star is 67% more massive than the Sun and two times larger. Its effective temperature is 7380 Kelvin, giving it the white hue typical of late A/early F stars. It has been suspected to be a δ Scuti variable, and found to be of constant brightness by some studies, but a more recent analysis with the Transiting Exoplanet Survey Satellite confirm this star is a Gamma Doradus variable.

The secondary (apparent magnitude 7.80) is a K0.5V star, indicating it is a dwarf star cooler than the Sun. Mu Ceti B has an effective temperature of 5,250 K and has a mass and radius measuring 80% solar units. Its effective temperature give it an orange hue typical of K-type stars.

Three companions were all discovered during occultations of Mu Ceti by the Moon. An orbit was derived for the brightest with a period of 1,202 days. Later studies have failed to find any evidence of these companions.
