= Delta Ceti =

Star in the constellation Cetus

- Location of δ Ceti (circled)

Observation data Epoch J2000.0 Equinox ICRS
- Constellation: Cetus
- Right ascension: 02^{h} 39^{m} 28.95579^{s}
- Declination: +00° 19′ 42.6345″
- Apparent magnitude (V): +4.06

Characteristics
- Evolutionary stage: main sequence
- Spectral type: B2 IV
- U−B color index: −0.88
- B−V color index: −0.21
- Variable type: β Cep

Astrometry
Radial velocity (R_{v})	12.7±0.9 km/s
Proper motion (μ)	RA: 12.85±0.17 mas/yr Dec.: −2.94±0.11 mas/yr
Parallax (π)	5.02±0.15 mas
Distance	650 ± 20 ly (199 ± 6 pc)
Absolute magnitude (M_{V})	−2.41

Orbit
Period (P)	169±6 yr
Semi-major axis (a)	69–157 AU
Eccentricity (e)	0.34±0.05
Inclination (i)	26–154°
Periastron epoch (T)	2,444,054±781 HJD
Argument of periastron (ω) (primary)	306±7°

Details

δ Cet A
Mass	7.9 M_{☉}
Radius	4.92±0.47 R_{☉}
Luminosity	5,100+1,300 −1,000 L_{☉}
Surface gravity (log g)	3.95±0.09 cgs
Temperature	22,090±1,580 K
Metallicity [Fe/H]	−0.24 dex
Rotational velocity (v sin i)	7±4 km/s
Age	7−18 Myr

δ Cet B
Mass	1.1–2.5 M_{☉}
Luminosity	2–51 L_{☉}

Other designations
- Sawyqed, δ Cet, 82 Ceti, BD−00°406, FK5 91, HD 16582, HIP 12387, HR 779, SAO 110665

Database references
SIMBAD	data

Delta Ceti, also named Sawyqed, is a candidate binary star system in the equatorial constellation of Cetus. The star's apparent visual magnitude of +4.06 means it is generally visible to the naked eye except in places highly affected to light pollution (see Bortle scale). It is 0.3238° north of the celestial equator compared to the celestial north pole's 90°. The star is positioned about 0.74° WNW of the spiral galaxy M77, but which at apparent magnitude 9.6 needs magnification to be made out and has an apparent size of only 0.1° by 0.12°.

Based upon an annual parallax shift of 5.02 mas as seen from Earth, it is around 650 light years from the Sun. Motion relative to our system's trajectory includes a highly parting vector: with a net radial velocity of about +13 km/s. It moves minutely across the celestial sphere – yet just over four times more in right ascension than in declination.

== Nomenclature ==
Delta Ceti is a Bayer designation that is Latinized from δ Ceti and abbreviated Delta Cet or δ Cet. This star, along with α Cet (Menkar), λ Cet, γ Cet (Kaffaljidhma), μ Cet, ξ^{1} Cet (Bawy) and ξ^{2} Cet were Al Kaff al Jidhmah, "the Part of a Hand". Qed or Sawyqed, the Circle or Sheepfold, is an ancient Egyptian constellation in the same area. The IAU Working Group on Star Names adopted the name Sawyqed for Delta Ceti A on 15 October 2026.

The catalogue of stars in the Technical Memorandum 33-507 - A Reduced Star Catalog Containing 537 Named Stars used Al Kaff al Jidhmah as the title for five stars: γ Cet as Kaffaljidhma, ξ^{1} Cet as Al Kaff al Jidhmah I, ξ^{2} Cet as Al Kaff al Jidhmah II, δ Cet as Al Kaff al Jidhmah III and μ Cet as Al Kaff al Jidhmah IV (excluding α Cet and λ Cet.)

In Chinese astronomy, 天囷 (Tiān Qūn), meaning Circular Celestial Granary, refers to an asterism consisting of δ Ceti, α Ceti, κ^{1} Ceti, λ Ceti, μ Ceti, ξ^{1} Ceti, ξ^{2} Ceti, ν Ceti, γ Ceti, 75 Ceti, 70 Ceti, 63 Ceti and 66 Ceti. Consequently, the Chinese name for δ Ceti itself is 天囷九 (Tiān Qūn jiǔ, English: the Ninth Star of Circular Celestial Granary.)

== Characteristics ==
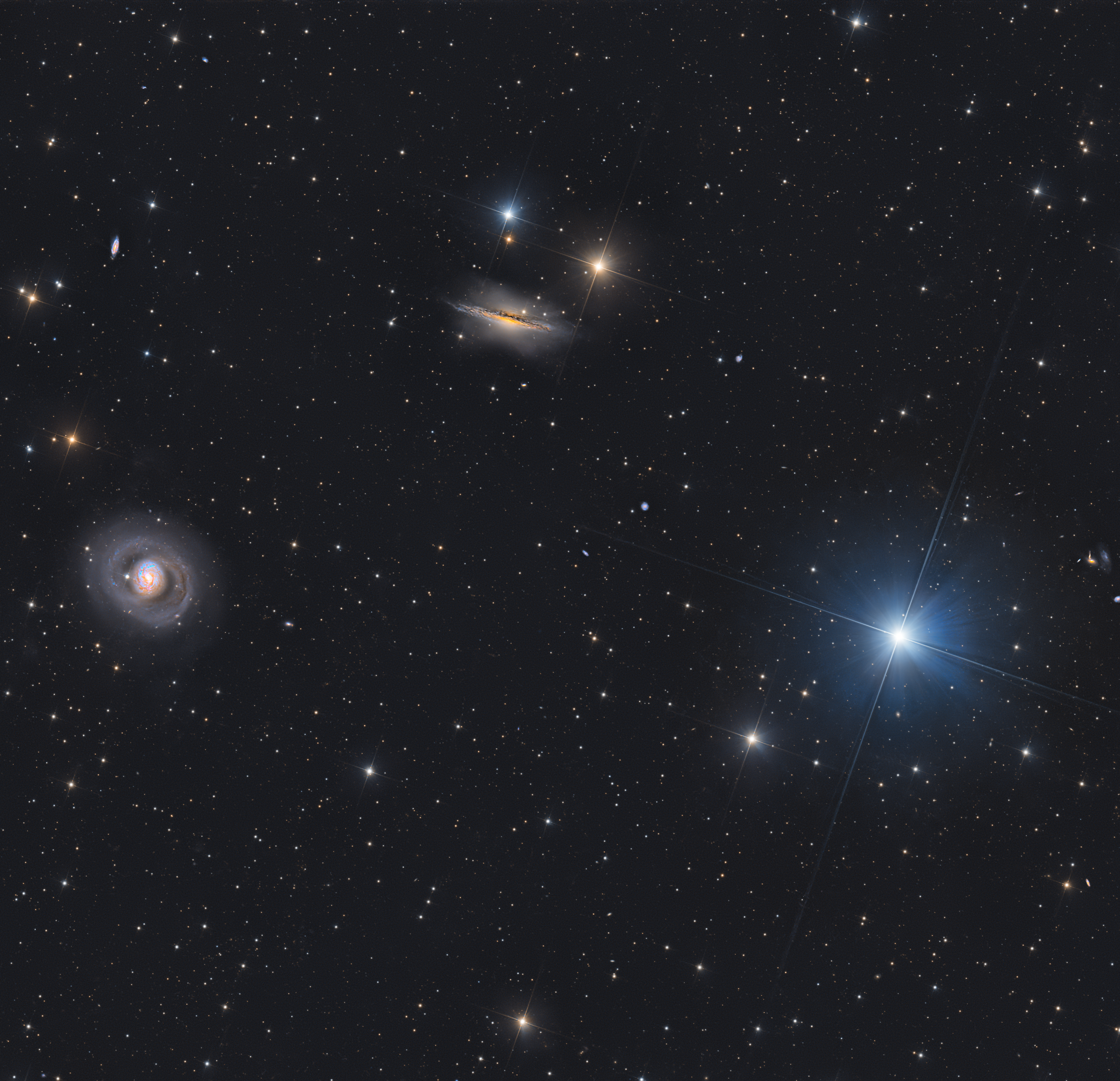
Delta Ceti is the bright blue star on the right. Messier 77 is the galaxy on the far left. NGC 1055 is the galaxy in the top middle.

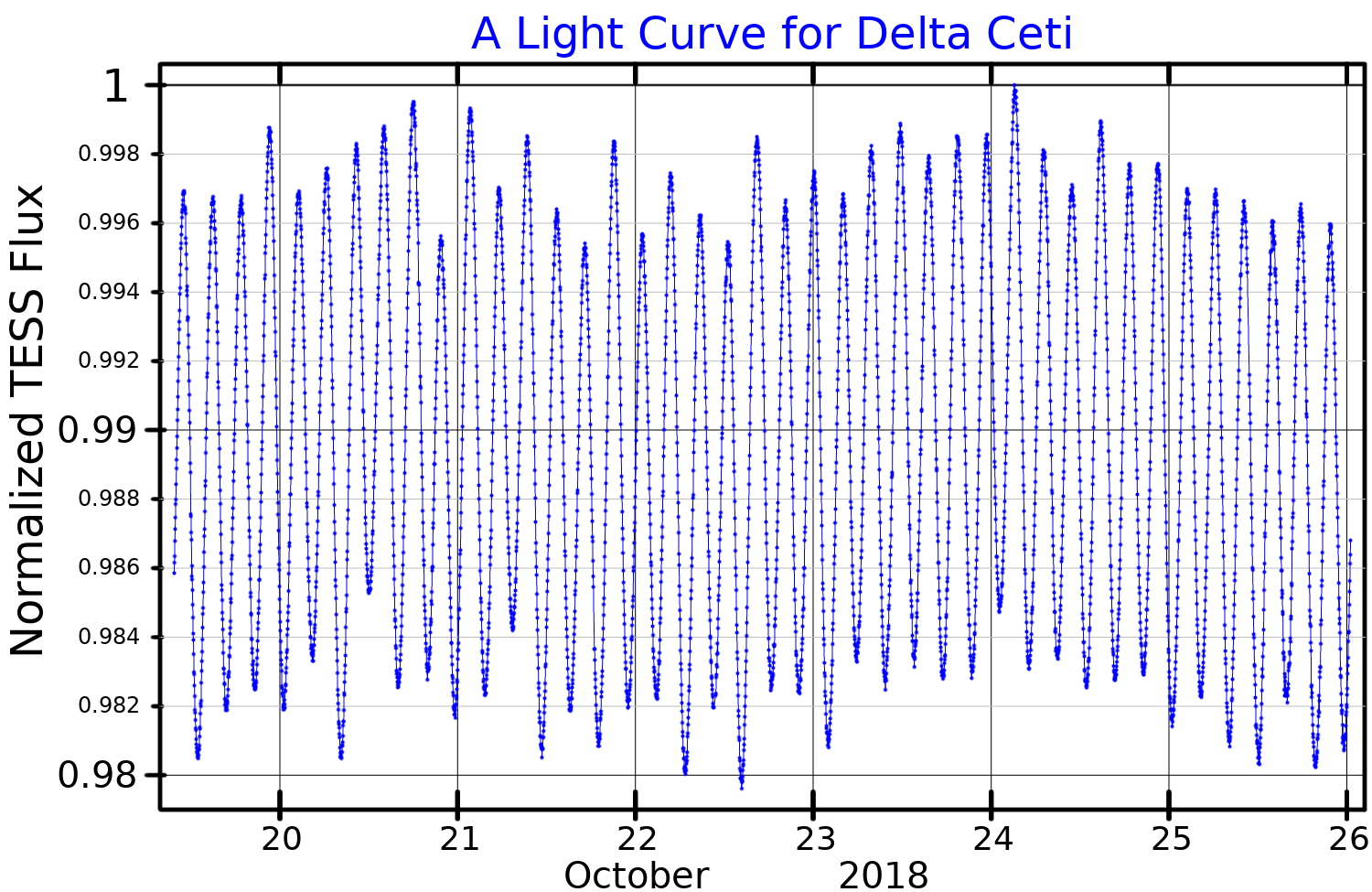
A light curve for Delta Ceti, plotted from TESS data

Delta Ceti is a Beta Cephei variable with a stellar classification of B2 IV. It varies in brightness with a period of 0.16114 days. Unlike most stars of its type, it does not display multiple periods of luminosity variation or multiple variations of its spectral line profiles.

The star is about 7−18 million years old and has a low projected rotational velocity of around 7 km/s, suggesting it is either rotating slowly or is being viewed from nearly pole on. It has 7.9 times the mass of the Sun and 4.9 times the Sun's radius. The star is radiating around 5,100 times the Sun's luminosity from its photosphere at an effective temperature of roughly 22,090 K. Models show that it is nearing the end of its main sequence life.

Historical observations together with radial velocity measurements from 2014 to 2018 indicate the presence of an orbiting companion with a mass of at least 1.10±0.05 M_{☉}, an orbital period of 169 years and a semi-major axis between 69 and 157 astronomical units. Astrometric measurements indicate that the companion's true mass is 2.2±1.0 M_{☉} if its semi-major axis is 60 AU, and it has not been detected in the spectrum, implying a mass less than 2.5 M_{☉} if it is a main sequence star.
