= Xi2 Ceti =

Star in the constellation Cetus

Xi^{2} Ceti
- Location of ξ^{2} Ceti (circled in red)

Observation data Epoch J2000.0 Equinox ICRS
- Constellation: Cetus
- Right ascension: 02^{h} 28^{m} 09.55706^{s}
- Declination: +08° 27′ 36.2168″
- Apparent magnitude (V): +4.279

Characteristics
- Spectral type: B9.5III or A0III-
- U−B color index: −0.137
- B−V color index: −0.053±0.003

Astrometry
| Radial velocity (R_{v}) | 11.90±1.3 km/s |
| Proper motion (μ) | RA: 23.707±0.844 mas/yr Dec.: −4.787±0.778 mas/yr |
| Parallax (π) | 16.5681±0.4608 mas |
| Distance | 197 ± 5 ly (60 ± 2 pc) |
| Absolute magnitude (M_{V}) | +0.45 |

Details
| Mass | 2.45 M_{☉} |
| Radius | 2.60±0.17 R_{☉} |
| Luminosity | 80.13 L_{☉} |
| Surface gravity (log g) | 4.00±0.25 cgs |
| Temperature | 10,630±400 K |
| Metallicity [Fe/H] | −0.43±0.04 dex |
| Rotational velocity (v sin i) | 55 km/s |
| Age | 127 Myr |

Other designations
- ξ^{2} Cet, 73 Ceti, BD+07°388, HD 15318, HIP 11484, HR 718, SAO 110543

Database references
| SIMBAD | data |

Xi^{2} Ceti is a star located in the equatorial constellation of Cetus. Its name is a Bayer designation that is Latinized from ξ^{2} Ceti, and abbreviated Xi^{2} Cet or ξ^{2} Cet. This star is visible to the naked eye with an apparent visual magnitude of +4.3. This star is located at a distance of approximately 197 light years from the Sun based on parallax measurements, and is drifting further away with a radial velocity of 12 km/s. It made its closest approach some 2.7 million years ago at a distance of around 128 light-years.

Xi^{2} Ceti is a spectrophotometric standard star. It displays a stellar classification of B9.5III, which suggests it has exhausted its core hydrogen, evolved away from the main sequence, and expanded to become a giant star, although still only 127 million years old. It has 2.45 times the mass and 2.6 times the radius of the Sun. The star is radiating 80 times the Sun's luminosity from its photosphere at an effective temperature of 10,630. It has a high rate of spin, showing a projected rotational velocity of 55 km/s.

In Chinese, 天囷 (Tiān Qūn), meaning Circular Celestial Granary, refers to an asterism consisting of α Ceti, κ^{1} Ceti, λ Ceti, μ Ceti, ξ^{1} Ceti, ξ^{2} Ceti, ν Ceti, γ Ceti, δ Ceti, 75 Ceti, 70 Ceti, 63 Ceti and 66 Ceti. Consequently, the Chinese name for Xi^{2} Ceti itself is "the Sixth Star of Circular Celestial Granary", Tiān Qūn Liù.
