= Gamma Ceti =

Star system in the constellation Cetus

γ Ceti
- Location of γ Ceti (circled in red)

Observation data Epoch J2000 Equinox ICRS
- Constellation: Cetus
- Right ascension: 02^{h} 43^{m} 18.03910^{s}
- Declination: +03° 14′ 08.9390″
- Apparent magnitude (V): 3.47 (3.56/6.63/10.16)

Characteristics
- Spectral type: A3 V + F3 V + K5
- U−B color index: +0.07
- B−V color index: +0.09

Astrometry
Radial velocity (R_{v})	–5.1 km/s
Proper motion (μ)	RA: –146.10 mas/yr Dec.: –146.12 mas/yr
Parallax (π)	40.97±0.63 mas
Distance	80 ± 1 ly (24.4 ± 0.4 pc)
Absolute magnitude (M_{V})	+1.53

Details

γ Cet A
Mass	1.88 M_{☉}
Radius	1.9 R_{☉}
Luminosity	21 L_{☉}
Surface gravity (log g)	4.3 cgs
Temperature	8,551 K
Metallicity [Fe/H]	0.00 dex
Rotational velocity (v sin i)	186 km/s
Age	647 Myr

γ Cet B
Mass	1.17 M_{☉}
Temperature	6,051 K
Rotational velocity (v sin i)	10 km/s

Other designations
- Kaffaljidhma, γ Cet, 86 Ceti, BD+02 422, HD 16970, HIP 12706, HR 804, SAO 110707, WDS 02433+0314

Database references
SIMBAD	Gamma Ceti system
- A
- B
- C

Gamma Ceti is a triple star system in the equatorial constellation of Cetus. Its name is a Bayer designation that is Latinized from γ Ceti, and abbreviated Gamma Cet or γ Cet. This system combined apparent visual magnitude of 3.47, which is bright enough to be visible to the naked eye. Based upon parallax measurements, this system is located at a distance of about 80 light-years (24.4 parsecs) from the Sun. It is drifting closer to the Sun with a line of sight velocity component of –5 km/s.

The three components are designated Gamma Ceti A (officially named Kaffaljidhma /ˌkæfəlˈdʒɪdmə/, the traditional name for the entire system), B and C.

== Nomenclature ==
γ Ceti (Latinised to Gamma Ceti) is the system's Bayer designation. The designations of the three components as Gamma Ceti A, B and C derive from the convention used by the Washington Multiplicity Catalog (WMC) for multiple star systems, and adopted by the International Astronomical Union (IAU). The close pair AB is also designated HIP 12706, HD 16970, and HR 804. The system of A, B, and C is collectively designated GJ 106.1 in the Gliese Catalogue of Nearby Stars.

Gamma Ceti bore the traditional names of Al Kaff al Jidhmah or Kaffaljidhma, derived from Arabic: الكف الجذماء al-kaf al-jaðmāʾ ('the cut-short hand'). According to a 1971 NASA memorandum, Al Kaff al Jidhmah was originally the title for five stars: Gamma Ceti as Kafaljidma, Xi^{1} Ceti as Al Kaff al Jidhmah I, Xi^{2} Ceti as Al Kaff al Jidhmah II, Delta Ceti as Al Kaff al Jidhmah III and Mu Ceti as Al Kaff al Jidhmah IV (excluding Alpha Ceti and Lambda Ceti). The IAU Working Group on Star Names (WGSN) approved the name Kaffaljidhma for the component Gamma Ceti A on February 1, 2017.

In Chinese astronomy, 天囷 Tiān Qūn, meaning 'Circular Celestial Granary', refers to an asterism consisting of Gamma Ceti, Alpha Ceti, Kappa^{1} Ceti, Lambda Ceti, Mu Ceti, Xi^{1} Ceti, Xi^{2} Ceti, Nu Ceti, Delta Ceti, 75 Ceti, 70 Ceti, 63 Ceti and 66 Ceti. Consequently, the Chinese name for Gamma Ceti itself is 天囷八 Tiān Qūn bā ('the Eighth Star of Circular Celestial Granary').

== System ==
Gamma Ceti appears to be a triple star system. The inner pair (A and B) have an angular separation of 2.6 arcseconds. The primary component of this pair (A) is an A-type main sequence star with a stellar classification of A3 V and a visual magnitude of 3.6. The fainter secondary component (B) is an F-type main sequence star that has a classification of F3 V and a magnitude of 6.6. The contrasting colors of these two stars makes them a popular target of amateur astronomers. The two can be resolved with a small, 4 in (10 cm) aperture telescope under ideal seeing conditions, although at times they can be a challenge to resolve even with a much larger scope.

At a wide separation of 840 arcseconds is component C, a dim, magnitude 10.2 K-type star with the designation BD+02 418. It shares a common proper motion with A and is at a very similar distance, but is separated from the close pair by over 20,000 au. It has a spectral classification of K5V. There are several other stars brighter and closer to Gamma Ceti than BD+02 418 – BD+02 419, HD 16985, and TYC 50-1274-1 – but they are all more distant background stars.

== Properties ==
The measured angular diameter of the primary star is 0.74±0.08 mas. At the estimated distance of this system, this yields a physical size of about 1.9 times the radius of the Sun. The secondary component of this system is an X-ray source with a luminosity of 2.2×10^{29} erg s^{−1}. Gamma Ceti is about 300 million years old, and it appears to be a member of the stream of stars loosely associated with the Ursa Major Moving Group. The primary has been examined for an excess of infrared emission that would suggest the presence of circumstellar matter, but none was found.
