= Xi1 Ceti =

Star in the constellation Cetus

Xi^{1} Ceti
- Location of ξ^{1} Ceti (circled)

Observation data Epoch J2000.0 Equinox ICRS
- Constellation: Cetus
- Right ascension: 02^{h} 12^{m} 00.000^{s}
- Declination: +08° 50′ 48.128″
- Apparent magnitude (V): +4.36 [combined]

Characteristics
- Spectral type: G7III Ba0.4 Fe-1 + DA4
- B−V color index: 0.878±0.024

Astrometry
Radial velocity (R_{v})	−3.93±0.09 km/s
Proper motion (μ)	RA: −26.965 mas/yr Dec.: −1.154 mas/yr
Parallax (π)	10.4184±0.3462 mas
Distance	310 ± 10 ly (96 ± 3 pc)
Absolute magnitude (M_{V})	–0.99

Orbit
Period (P)	1,642.1±1.3
Semi-major axis (a)	≥ 0.896 ± 0.020 AU (134 ± 3 Gm)
Eccentricity (e)	0 (fixed)
Periastron epoch (T)	34,985±5 MJD
Semi-amplitude (K_{1}) (primary)	5.91±0.14 km/s

Details

A
Mass	3.40+0.21 −0.11 M_{☉} 3.80 M_{☉}
Radius	16.8±0.6 R_{☉}
Luminosity	169.7+10.7 −10.4 L_{☉}
Surface gravity (log g)	2.74+1.46 −0.56 cgs
Temperature	5,138+662 −1,131 K
Metallicity [Fe/H]	−0.01 dex
Age	100 Myr; 271+34 −46 Myr

B
Mass	0.8 M_{☉}
Surface gravity (log g)	8.4 cgs

Other designations
- Bawy, ξ^{1} Cet, 65 Ceti, NSV 749, BD+08°345, HD 13611, HIP 10324, HR 649, SAO 110408, WDS 02130+0851, WD 02130+0851

Database references
SIMBAD	data

Xi^{1} Ceti, also named Bawy, is a binary star system located in the equatorial constellation of Cetus. This system is visible to the naked eye with a combined apparent visual magnitude of +4.36. The distance to this system is approximately 310 light years based on parallax measurements, and it is drifting closer to the Sun with a radial velocity of −4 km/s. The proximity of the star to the ecliptic means it is subject to lunar occultations.

== Nomenclature ==
Xi^{1} Ceti is a Bayer designation that is Latinized from ξ^{1} Ceti, and is abbreviated Xi^{1} Cet or ξ^{1} Cet.

In Chinese astronomy, 天囷 (Tiān Qūn), meaning Circular Celestial Granary, refers to an asterism consisting of α Ceti, κ^{1} Ceti, λ Ceti, μ Ceti, ξ^{1} Ceti, ξ^{2} Ceti, ν Ceti, γ Ceti, δ Ceti, 75 Ceti, 70 Ceti, 63 Ceti and 66 Ceti. Consequently, the Chinese name for Xi^{1} Ceti itself is "the Fifth Star of Circular Celestial Granary", Tiān Qūn Wu.

Bawy (bȝwy), the dual form of Ba 'the Soul', is an ancient Egyptian decan which is not precisely identified, but likely corresponds to a pair of stars in Cetus – perhaps Xi^{1} and Xi^{2} Ceti. The IAU Working Group on Star Names adopted the name Bawy for Xi^{1} Ceti A on 15 October 2026.

== Properties ==
The spectroscopic binary nature of Xi^{1} Ceti was discovered in 1901 by William Wallace Campbell using the Mills spectrograph at the Lick Observatory. The pair have a circular orbit with a period of 4.5 years and a separation of 3.8 AU. It is a suspected eclipsing binary with an amplitude of 0.03 in magnitude, which would suggest the orbital plane has a high inclination.

The primary, designated component A, is a mild barium giant star with a stellar classification of G7III Ba0.4 Fe-1. Morgan and Keenan in 1973 had classified it as a bright giant star with an anomalous underabundance of the CN molecule. Evidence has been found for an overabundance of s-process elements, although this is disputed. The star has 3.4 times the mass and 16.8 times the radius of the Sun. The companion, component B, is a small white dwarf companion with 80% of the mass of the Sun and a class of DA4. It was detected in 1985 by its ultraviolet emission.
