= USS Diphda =

Cargo ship of the United States Navy

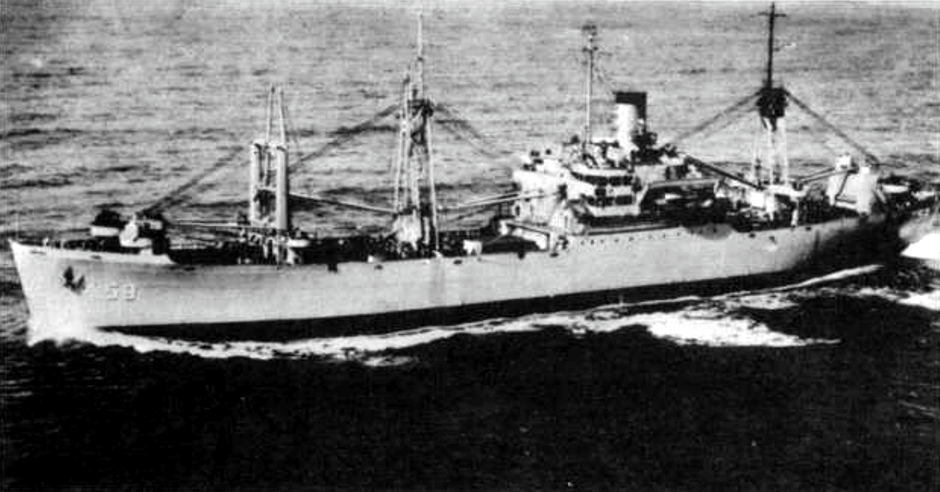

History

United States
- Name: USS Diphda
- Namesake: The star Diphda in the constellation Cetus
- Builder: Federal Shipbuilding and Drydock Company, Kearny, New Jersey
- Launched: 11 May 1944
- Commissioned: 8 July 1944
- Decommissioned: 11 May 1956
- Honours and awards: 1 battle star (World War II); 6 battle stars (Korea)
- Fate: Scrapped 1976

General characteristics
- Class & type: Andromeda-class attack cargo ship
- Type: Type C2-S-B1
- Displacement: 6,737 long tons (6,845 t)
- Length: 459 ft 2 in (139.95 m)
- Beam: 63 ft (19 m)
- Draft: 26 ft 4 in (8.03 m)
- Speed: 16 knots (30 km/h; 18 mph)
- Complement: 429
- Armament: 1 × 5"/38 caliber gun mount

USS Diphda (AKA-59) was an Andromeda-class attack cargo ship named after a star in the constellation Cetus. She served as a commissioned ship for 11 years and 10 months.

Diphda was launched 11 May 1944 by the Federal Shipbuilding and Drydock Company, Kearny, New Jersey, under a Maritime Commission contract; sponsored by Mrs. Anna Rosenberg; transferred to the Navy on 7 July 1944; and commissioned the next day.

== Service history ==
=== 1944–1945 ===
Diphda sailed from Norfolk on 15 August 1944, loaded cargo at Pearl Harbor from 4 to 21 September, then sailed to New Guinea for practice landings. On 4 January 1945, she departed Noemfoor Island for the invasion of Lingayen Gulf. Returning to Manus on 24 January, she loaded landing craft to replace those transferred at Lingayen Gulf, then loaded cargo at Wakde Island for San Pedro Bay, Leyte, where she arrived on 10 February.

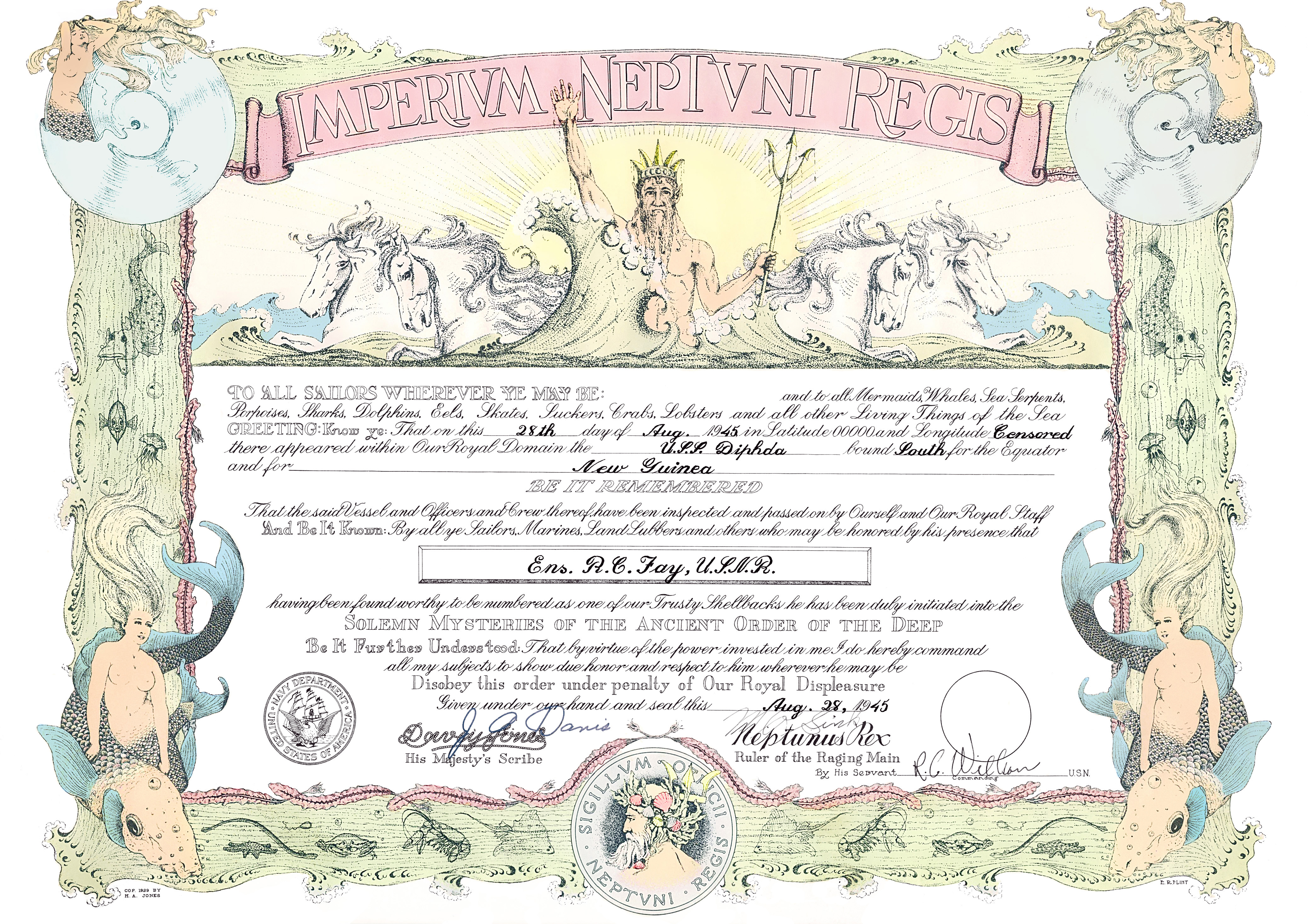
Signature of Captain Willson on Ensign Bob Fay's shellback certificate for crossing the equator probably en route to Manus Island, August 28, 1945

After training exercises in the Philippines until 27 March 1945, Diphda sortied for the invasion of Okinawa, discharging her cargo in the transport area from 1 to 10 April. She returned to Pearl Harbor on 25 April for voyage repairs and alterations, then continued to the west coast, arriving at San Francisco on 18 June. She voyaged to Pearl Harbor carrying ammunition from 8 July to 5 August, then sailed from San Francisco on 13 August with cargo for Manus and Samar. She carried Army cargo to Wakanoura Wan, Honshū, in support of the occupation of Japan, then embarked homeward bound servicemen at Okinawa, returning with them to Portland, Oregon, on 29 November.

=== 1946–1956 ===
Between 11 January and 22 May 1946 and again between 28 November 1946 and 17 May 1947, Diphda served in the Far East, carrying cargo to Guam, Okinawa, and Chinese ports. She transported cargo for the Second Arctic Expedition to Point Barrow, Alaska, between 9 July and 11 October 1947, then performed similar service between west coast ports, occasionally cruising as far west as Guam, Pearl Harbor, and Saipan. In both 1949 and 1950, her cargo duty took her to the east coast, and between 26 May and 20 June 1950, she called at Whittier and Kodiak, Alaska.

With the outbreak of hostilities in Korea, Diphda was assigned to Service Force, Pacific (ServPac), for duty as an ammunition ship. She made an emergency delivery of ammunition at Pusan, Korea, and offloaded the remainder of her cargo at Yokosuka before returning to San Francisco on 12 September 1950. Six days later, she got underway for an extended tour in Korean waters during which she carried ammunition between depots in Japan and Korea and to combat units and ships. On 26 December, she replenished heavy cruiser Saint Paul (CA-73) at sea. Diphda returned to San Francisco on 29 October 1951 for overhaul.

From 5 February to 11 November 1952, Diphda served with the Military Sea Transportation Service, making shuttle runs from the west coast to the western Pacific, shuttling between Oakland, California, and Japanese ports. Except for service as station fleet issue ship at Sasebo from 12 May to 27 October 1954, Diphda continued this duty until 2 December 1955. Diphda was placed out of commission in reserve at San Diego on 11 May 1956.

== Awards ==
Diphda received one battle star for World War II service and six battle stars for Korean War service.
