= USS Menkar =

Liberty ship of WWII

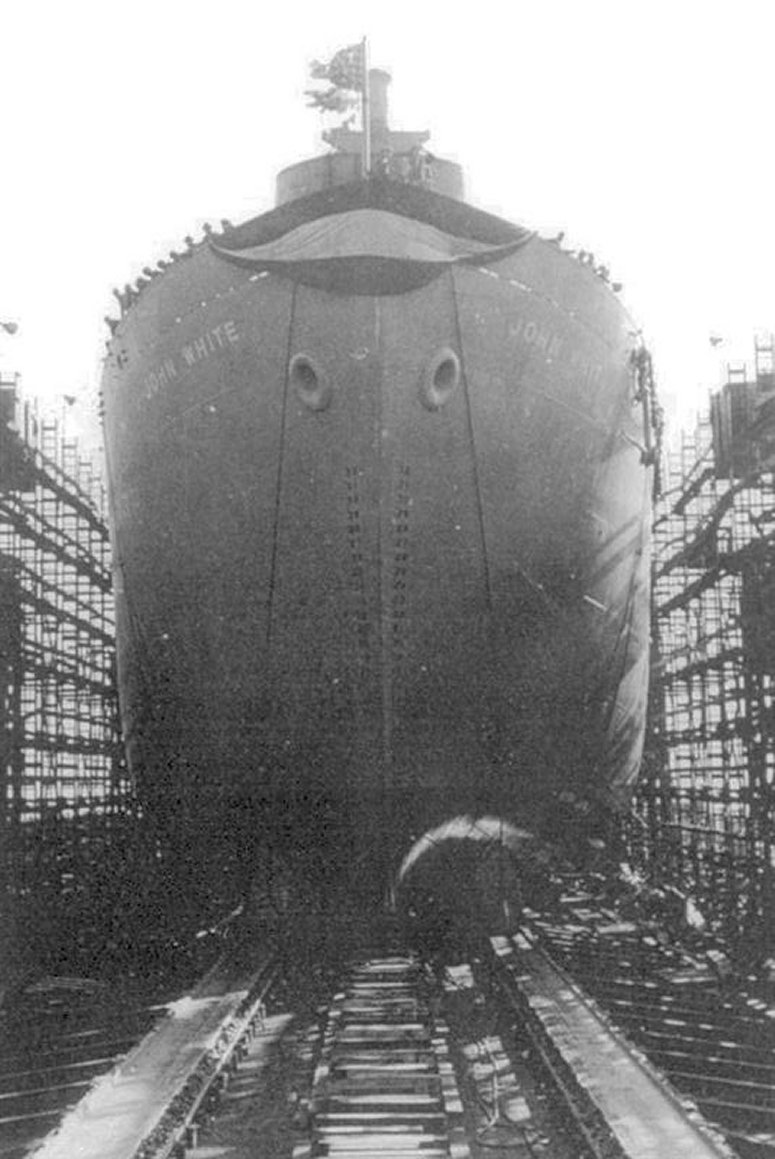
- SS John White launching 31 December 1943, at St. Johns River Shipbuilding Co., Jacksonville, Florida.

History

United States
- Name: John White
- Namesake: John White
- Owner: War Shipping Administration (WSA)
- Ordered: as a type (EC2-S-C1) hull, MC hull 1218
- Awarded: 4 March 1942
- Builder: St. Johns River Shipbuilding Company, Jacksonville, Florida
- Cost: $1,442,577
- Yard number: 26
- Way number: 2
- Laid down: 17 November 1943
- Launched: 31 December 1943
- Sponsored by: Mrs. Cora E. Owens
- Completed: 17 January 1944
- Identification: Call sign: KVLO
- Fate: Transferred to U.S. Navy, 17 January 1944
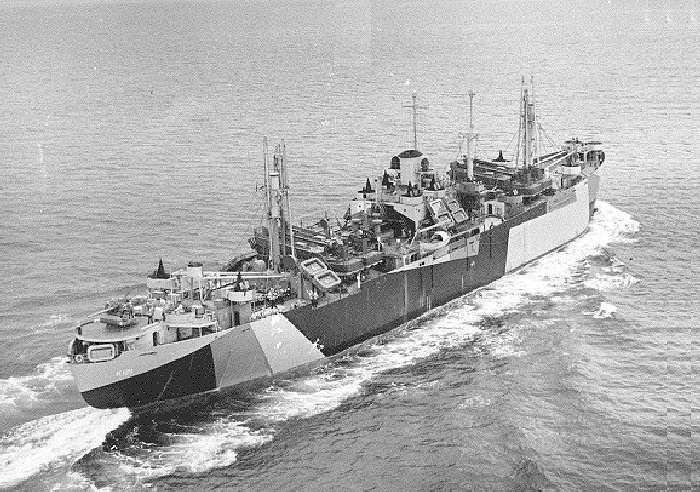
- USS Menkar (AK-123) underway, date and location unknown. Note dazzle camouflage scheme.

United States
- Name: Menkar
- Namesake: The star Menkar
- Operator: United States Navy (June 1944–October 1944); United States Coast Guard (October 1944–April 1946)
- Acquired: 17 January 1944
- Commissioned: 18 January 1944 (reduced commission); 2 June 1944 (full commission)
- Decommissioned: 22 January 1944; 15 April 1946
- Stricken: 1 May 1946
- Identification: Hull symbol: AK-123; Call sign: NHBZ
- Fate: Sold for scrapping, 8 May 1962, removed from fleet, 22 May 1962
- Notes: Name reverted to John White when laid up in Reserve Fleet

General characteristics
- Class & type: Crater-class cargo ship
- Displacement: 4,023 long tons (4,088 t) (standard); 14,550 long tons (14,780 t) (full load)
- Length: 441 ft 6 in (134.57 m)
- Beam: 56 ft 11 in (17.35 m)
- Draft: 28 ft 4 in (8.64 m)
- Installed power: 2 × Oil fired 450 °F (232 °C) boilers, operating at 220 psi (1,500 kPa) , (manufactured by Combustion Engineering); 2,500 shp (1,900 kW)
- Propulsion: 1 × Vertical triple-expansion reciprocating steam engine, (manufactured by General Machinery Corp., Hamilton, Ohio); 1 × screw propeller
- Speed: 12.5 kn (23.2 km/h; 14.4 mph)
- Capacity: 7,800 t (7,700 long tons) DWT; 444,206 cu ft (12,578.5 m^{3}) (non-refrigerated)
- Complement: 282
- Armament: 1 × 5 in (130 mm)/38 caliber dual purpose gun; 4 × 40 mm (1.6 in) 40mm Bofors anti-aircraft gun mounts; 6 × 20 mm (0.79 in) Oerlikon cannons anti-aircraft gun mounts

USS Menkar (AK-123) was a Crater-class cargo ship, converted from a Liberty Ship, commissioned by the U.S. Navy for service in World War II. She was first named after John White, a settler among those who sailed with Richard Grenville, to present-day North Carolina, in 1585, to found the Roanoke Colony. White acted as artist and mapmaker to the expedition. He became the governor, in 1587, of the colony, and his granddaughter, Virginia Dare, was the first English child born in the Americas. She was renamed and commissioned after Menkar, the second-brightest star in the constellation of Cetus. She was responsible for delivering troops, goods and equipment to locations in the war zone.

== Construction ==
John White was laid down on 17 November 1943, under a Maritime Commission (MARCOM) contract, MC hull 1218, by the St. Johns River Shipbuilding Company, Jacksonville, Florida; she was sponsored by Mrs. Cora E. Owens, a yard employee, and launched on 31 December 1943. She was acquired by the U.S. Navy, under a bareboat charter on 17 January 1944, and renamed Menkar. Placed in temporary commission the next day to be ferried to Miami, Florida, where she decommissioned 22 January, for conversion by Dade Drydock Co.; and commissioned 2 June 1944.

== Service history ==
Menkar sailed for Norfolk, Virginia, 20 June, and following shakedown, was temporarily assigned to NTS. In late July, she loaded on supplies at Norfolk, and got underway for the Panama Canal Zone, via Guantanamo, Cuba, arriving 11 August, for duty with the U.S. Pacific Fleet.

In October 1944, Menkar was transferred to the United States Coast Guard for Long Range Navigation (LORAN) work. Construction of stations for LORAN, a navigational system for ships and planes based on the transmission of radio wave pulses, had only begun in the Pacific Ocean a year before; and a cargo ship was needed to transport material and equipment.

On 31 October, Menkar reached Saipan, Marianas, to unload cargo for the first LORAN station in the Marianas chain. On 11 November, she anchored in Apra Harbor, and unloaded supplies for the Guam station. She then continued on to Ulithi, Carolines, arriving 13 December. The Marianas stations proved invaluable in the amphibious assault on Iwo Jima, in February 1945, and in the bombing attacks on Japan, begun in March of that year.

On 5 March 1945, Menkar was off Angaur, Palaus, with materials to set up a fixed station. Four days later she was anchored at Pulo Anna, Palaus, unloading her cargo. By the end of March, she had supplied the other two stations of the Palau Mortal chain.

The cargo ship next helped tighten the LORAN network around Japan, with the construction of the Iwo Jima–Tokyo–Okinawa chain. Menkar reached Prison Island, a tiny rock island off Iwo Jima, 20 April, just 2 months after the U.S. Marines had first landed. Three days later she departed for Ikei Island, arriving 10 May. In the next 4 days she fought off intermittent Japanese air raids while discharging supplies at Okinawa. She continued on to Katchin Wan Harbor, Okinawa, where she again was harassed by enemy planes. On 18 May, Menkar retaliated by shooting down an "Oscar" diving directly at the ship.

Before construction of the third station at O Shima began, Menkar steamed for the west coast, via Pearl Harbor, Hawaii, arriving Seattle, Washington, 5 August. She remained there through the Japanese surrender 15 August.

On 14 September, she departed Seattle, for Pearl Harbor, embarking 307 passengers on arrival on 24 September. She again embarked LORAN units and got underway 9 October, for the Marianas, stopping in the Gilberts and the Marshalls before anchoring at Guam, 26 October.

With the construction of a China Sea LORAN chain planned soon after the cessation of hostilities, she continued on to the East China Sea for LORAN duty into the next year. When the project was abandoned, Menkar returned to San Francisco, California, 3 March 1946.

== Decommissioning ==
On 15 April 1946, she decommissioned and was delivered to the War Shipping Administration for service under MARCOM as John White. She was struck from the Navy List 1 May 1946. She was sold for scrapping to Union Minerals and Alloys Corporation, on 7 July 1947, for $48,789.99. She was withdrawn from the fleet on 22 May 1962.

== Military awards and honors ==
Menkar's crew was eligible for the following medals:

- American Campaign Medal
- Asiatic-Pacific Campaign Medal
- World War II Victory Medal
- Navy Occupation Service Medal (with Asia clasp)

== Bibliography ==
- "St. John's River Shipbuilding, Jacksonville FL". www.ShipbuildingHistory.com. 16 October 2010.
- Maritime Administration. "John White". Ship History Database Vessel Status Card. U.S. Department of Transportation, Maritime Administration.
- "USS Menkar (AK-123)". NavSource. 13 June 2014.
- "Menkar". Dictionary of American Naval Fighting Ships. Naval History and Heritage Command. 7 August 2015. This article incorporates text from this source, which is in the public domain.
- "SS John White".
