= JKCS 041 =

Very distant galaxy cluster

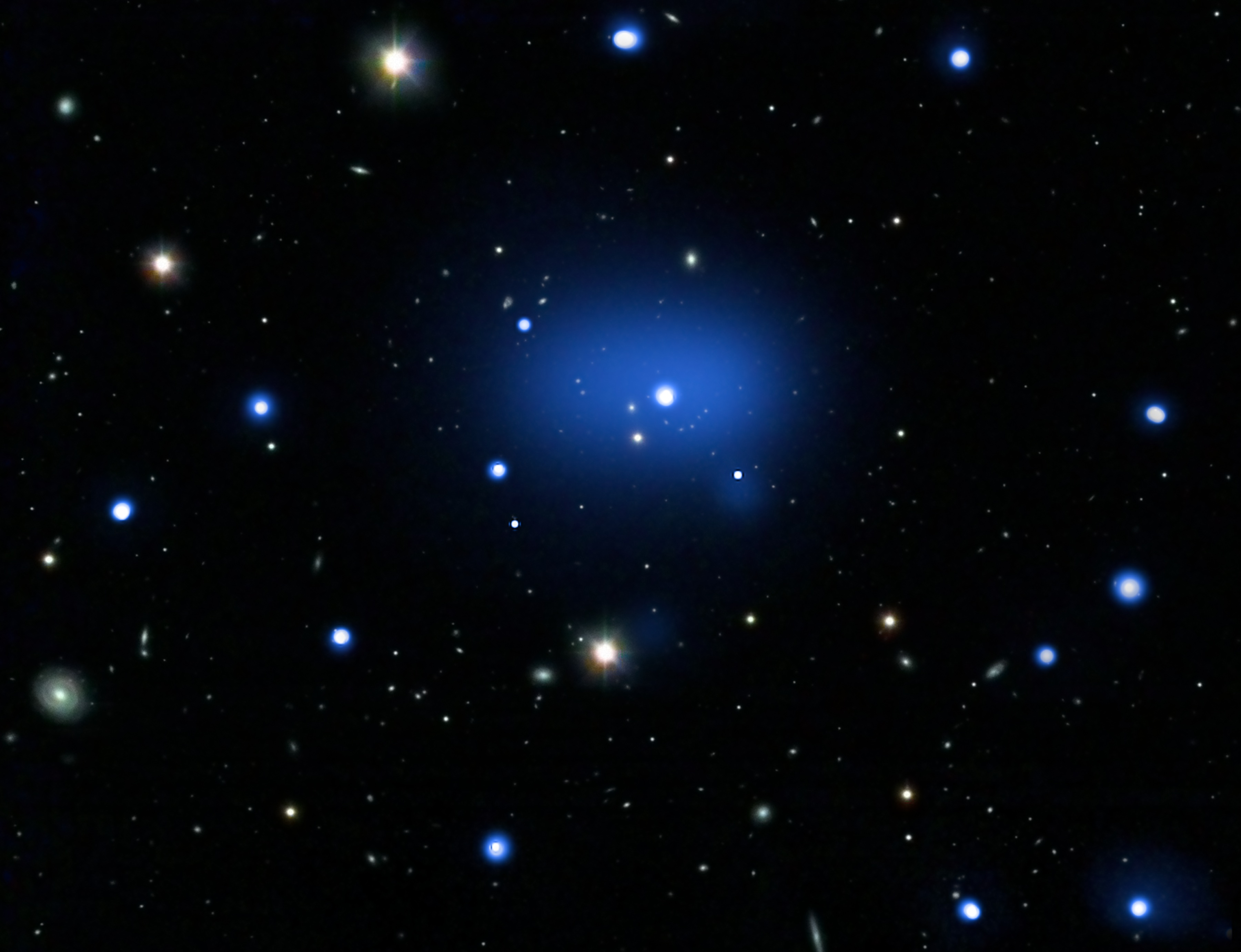
JKCS 041 (Chandra X-ray)

JKCS 041 is a cluster of galaxies with the distinction, as of 2009, of being the farthest galaxy cluster observed from Earth. It is estimated to be 10.2 billion light-years away, seen at redshift 1.9. The cluster is located in the constellation Cetus at a photometrically determined redshift of z=1.9 at right ascension 2^{h} 26^{m} 44^{s} declination −04° 41′ 37″ (J2000.0). There are at least 19 members in the cluster.

Tour of JKCS041

== See also ==
- List of the most distant astronomical objects
