= Beta Ceti =

Brightest star in the constellation Cetus

β Ceti / Diphda
- Location of β Ceti (circled)

Observation data Epoch J2000 Equinox ICRS
- Constellation: Cetus
- Right ascension: 00^{h} 43^{m} 35.37090^{s}
- Declination: −17° 59′ 11.7827″
- Apparent magnitude (V): 2.02

Characteristics
- Evolutionary stage: Red clump
- Spectral type: K0 III
- U−B color index: +0.88
- B−V color index: +1.01
- Variable type: Suspected

Astrometry
Radial velocity (R_{v})	+12.9 km/s
Proper motion (μ)	RA: +232.55 mas/yr Dec.: +31.99 mas/yr
Parallax (π)	33.86±0.16 mas
Distance	96.3 ± 0.5 ly (29.5 ± 0.1 pc)
Absolute magnitude (M_{V})	−0.13

Details
Mass	3.5 M_{☉}
Radius	17.52±0.47 R_{☉}
Luminosity	149.7±3.4 L_{☉}
Surface gravity (log g)	2.43±0.07 cgs
Temperature	4,792±35 K
Metallicity [Fe/H]	−0.09 dex
Rotational velocity (v sin i)	18 km/s
Age	460±130 Myr

Other designations
- Diphda, Deneb Kaitos, β Cet, 16 Cet, BD−18 115, GJ 31, HD 4128, HIP 3419, HR 188, SAO 147420, PLX 134.00

Database references
SIMBAD	data
ARICNS	data

Beta Ceti is the brightest star in the constellation of Cetus. It is officially named Diphda, pronounced /ˈdɪfdə/; Beta Ceti is its Bayer designation, which is Latinized from β Ceti and abbreviated Beta Cet and β Cet. Although designated 'beta', it is actually brighter than the 'alpha' star in the constellation, Menkar, by half a magnitude. This orange giant is easy to identify due to its location in an otherwise dark section of the celestial sphere. Based on parallax measurements, it lies at an estimated distance of 96.3 light-years (29.5 parsecs) from the Sun.

== Properties ==
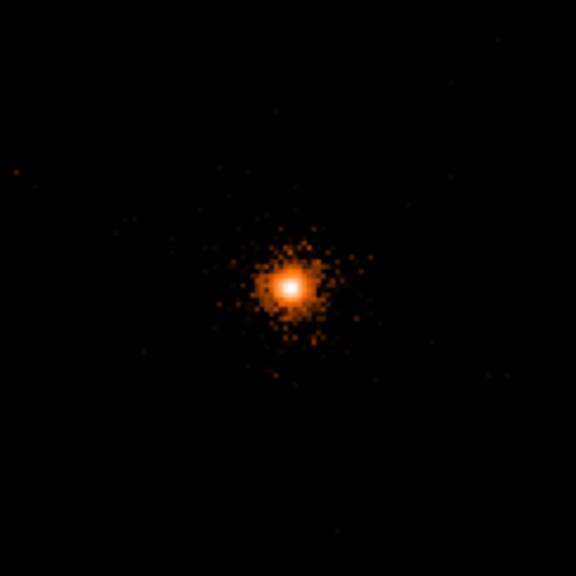
Image of orange giant Beta Ceti from NASA's Chandra X-ray Observatory.

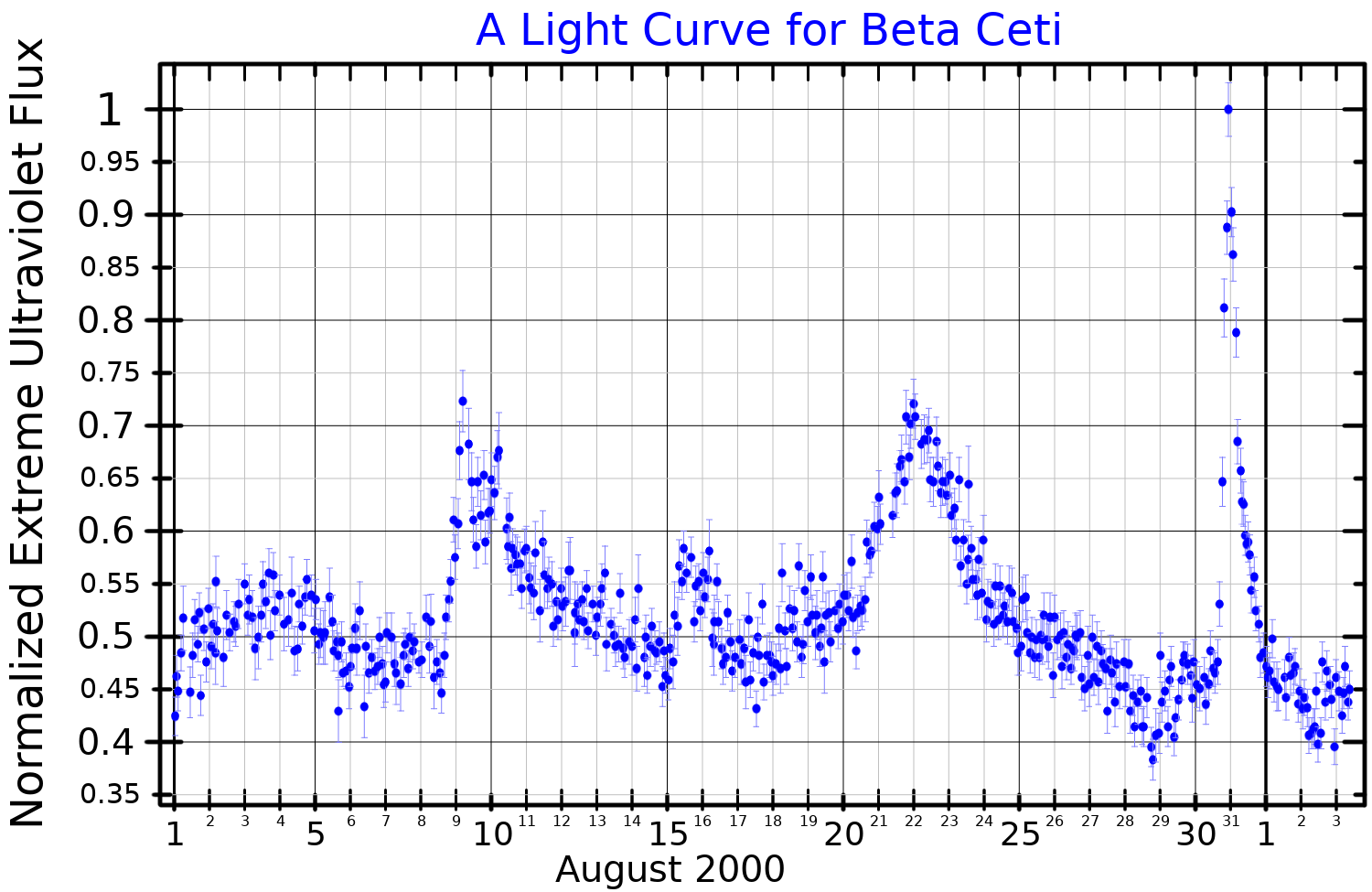
An extreme ultraviolet light curve for Beta Ceti, adapted from Ayres et al. (2001)

Diphda has an apparent visual magnitude of 2.02, making it the brightest star in Cetus. It has a stellar classification of K0 III, although some sources list a classification of G9.5 III indicating that it lies along the dividing line separating G-type from K-type stars. The luminosity class 'III' means that it is a giant, a star that has consumed the hydrogen at its core and evolved away from the main sequence. With a mass of 3.5 solar masses, Beta Ceti was a B-type star when it formed on the main sequence. After passing through the red giant stage, it underwent a helium flash event and is now a red clump star generating energy through the thermonuclear fusion of helium at its core. Beta Ceti will remain in this mode for over 100 million years.

The effective temperature of the star's outer envelope is about 4,797 K, giving it the characteristic orange hue of a K-type star. In spite of its cooler temperature, Diphda is much more luminous than the Sun with a luminosity of about 150 times that of the Sun, while its photosphere has swollen to around 18 times the size of the Sun, in contrast with the initial radius of 2.01 R_{☉} when still in the main sequence.

This star displays flaring activity that results in random outbursts that increase the luminosity of the star over intervals lasting several days. This is a much longer duration than for comparable solar flare activity on the Sun, which typically last for periods measured in hours. In 2005, a relatively high rate of X-ray emission was detected with the XMM-Newton space observatory. It is emitting about 2,000 times the X-ray luminosity of the Sun, allowing the star to be imaged with the Chandra X-ray Observatory.

== Nomenclature ==
β Ceti (Latinised to Beta Ceti) is the star's Bayer designation.

It bore the traditional names Diphda and Deneb Kaitos /ˌdɛnɛb ˈkeɪtɒs/. Diphda is Arabic for 'frog', from the phrase ضفدع الثاني aḍ-ḍifdaʿ aṯ-ṯānī 'the second frog' (the 'first frog' is Fomalhaut). This name has also been Latinized as Rana Secunda, which is the source of the name Rana for Delta Eridani. Deneb Kaitos is from الذنب القيتوس الجنوب Al Dhanab al Ḳaiṭos al Janūbīyy 'southern tail of Cetus'.

In 2016, the International Astronomical Union organized a Working Group on Star Names (WGSN) to catalogue and standardize proper names for stars. The WGSN approved the name Diphda for this star on August 21, 2016 and it is now so entered in the IAU Catalog of Star Names.

In Chinese astronomy, Deneb Kaitos is called 土司空, Pinyin: Tǔsīkōng, meaning Master of Constructions, because this star is marking itself and stands alone in the Master of Constructions asterism, Legs mansion (see : Chinese constellation). 土司空 (Tǔsīkōng), westernized into Too Sze Kung by R.H. Allen and the meaning is "Superintendent of Earthworks."

=== Namesake ===
USS Diphda (AKA-59) was a U.S. Navy ship.

== See also ==
- List of nearest giant stars
