= 63 Ceti =

Star in the constellation of Cetus

Observation data Epoch J2000 Equinox ICRS
- Constellation: Cetus
- Right ascension: 02^{h} 11^{m} 35.835^{s}
- Declination: −01° 49′ 31.537″
- Apparent magnitude (V): 5.933±0.010

Characteristics
- Spectral type: K0III
- U−B color index: +0.70
- B−V color index: +0.97

Astrometry
Radial velocity (R_{v})	28.02±0.13 km/s
Proper motion (μ)	RA: −11.171±0.043 mas/yr Dec.: −31.922±0.026 mas/yr
Parallax (π)	8.6173±0.0396 mas
Distance	378 ± 2 ly (116.0 ± 0.5 pc)
Absolute magnitude (M_{V})	0.57

Details
Mass	1.155±0.182 M_{☉}
Radius	11.051±0.135 R_{☉}
Luminosity	52.579±3.407 L_{☉}
Surface gravity (log g)	2.37±0.09 cgs
Temperature	4676±80 K
Metallicity [Fe/H]	−0.13±0.03 dex
Rotational velocity (v sin i)	3.175±0.653 km/s
Age	990±50 Myr

Other designations
- 63 Cet, BD−02°375, HD 13468, HIP 10234, HR 639, SAO 129739

Database references
SIMBAD	data

63 Ceti is a star in the constellation of Cetus, located just over a degree south of the celestial equator. With an apparent magnitude of about 5.933±0.010 the star is barely visible to the naked eye (see Bortle scale) as a dim, orange-hued point of light. Parallax estimates put it at a distance of about 378 light years (116 parsecs) away from the Earth, and it is drifting further away with a radial velocity of 28.02±0.13 km/s.

63 Ceti has a spectral type of K0III, implying an aging K-type giant star. These types of stars are generally reddish-colored stars with spectral types from K to M, with radii that are 10 to 100 times larger than the Sun. 63 Ceti fits this description, with a radius about 11.051±0.135 times larger than the Sun, a mass of about 1.155±0.182 times the Sun, and an effective temperature of 4676±80 K. 63 Ceti is a red clump giant, indicating it is currently at the horizontal branch, a stage in stellar evolution, and is generating energy through core helium fusion. It is close to a billion years old and is radiating 52.579±3.407 times the luminosity of the Sun from its photosphere at an effective temperature of 4676±80 K.
