= Kappa1 Ceti =

Variable yellow dwarf star in the constellation Cetus

κ^{1} Ceti
- Location of κ^{1} Ceti (circled)

Observation data Epoch J2000.0 Equinox J2000.0
- Constellation: Cetus
- Right ascension: 03^{h} 19^{m} 21.6964^{s}
- Declination: +03° 22′ 12.715″
- Apparent magnitude (V): 4.84

Characteristics
- Evolutionary stage: Main sequence
- Spectral type: G5Vv
- U−B color index: +0.185
- B−V color index: +0.674
- Variable type: BY Dra

Astrometry
Radial velocity (R_{v})	+19.9 km/s
Proper motion (μ)	RA: +269.298 mas/yr Dec.: +93.957 mas/yr
Parallax (π)	107.8023±0.1838 mas
Distance	30.26 ± 0.05 ly (9.28 ± 0.02 pc)
Absolute magnitude (M_{V})	5.16

Details
Mass	1.021±0.021 M_{☉}
Radius	0.95±0.05 R_{☉}
Luminosity	0.879±0.028 L_{☉}
Surface gravity (log g)	4.50±0.04 cgs
Temperature	5,786±87 K
Metallicity [Fe/H]	+0.04±0.01 dex
Rotation	9.2 days
Rotational velocity (v sin i)	4.5 km/s
Age	300–400 Myr

Other designations
- κ^{1} Cet, 96 Ceti, NSV 1100, BD+02°518, FK5 1095, GJ 137, HD 20630, HIP 15457, HR 996, SAO 111120, WDS J03194+0322A, LTT 11094

Database references
SIMBAD	data
ARICNS	data

Kappa^{1} Ceti is a yellow-hued variable star in the equatorial constellation of Cetus. Its name is a Bayer designation that is Latinized from κ^{1} Ceti, and abbreviated Kappa^{1} Cet or κ^{1} Cet. Bayer used the designations κ Ceti and g Tauri for the same star; g Tauri is now no longer used. With an apparent visual magnitude of 4.84, it is visible to the naked eye. Based on parallax measurements, it is located at a distance of 30.3 light-years (9.3 pc) from the Sun. The star is drifting further away with a line of sight velocity component of +20 km/s.

The star was discovered to have a rapid rotation, roughly once every nine days, making it extremely unique among stars of this size. Though there are no extrasolar planets confirmed to be orbiting the star, Kappa^{1} Ceti is considered a good candidate to contain terrestrial planets, like the Earth. The system is a candidate binary star, but has not been confirmed.

== Description ==
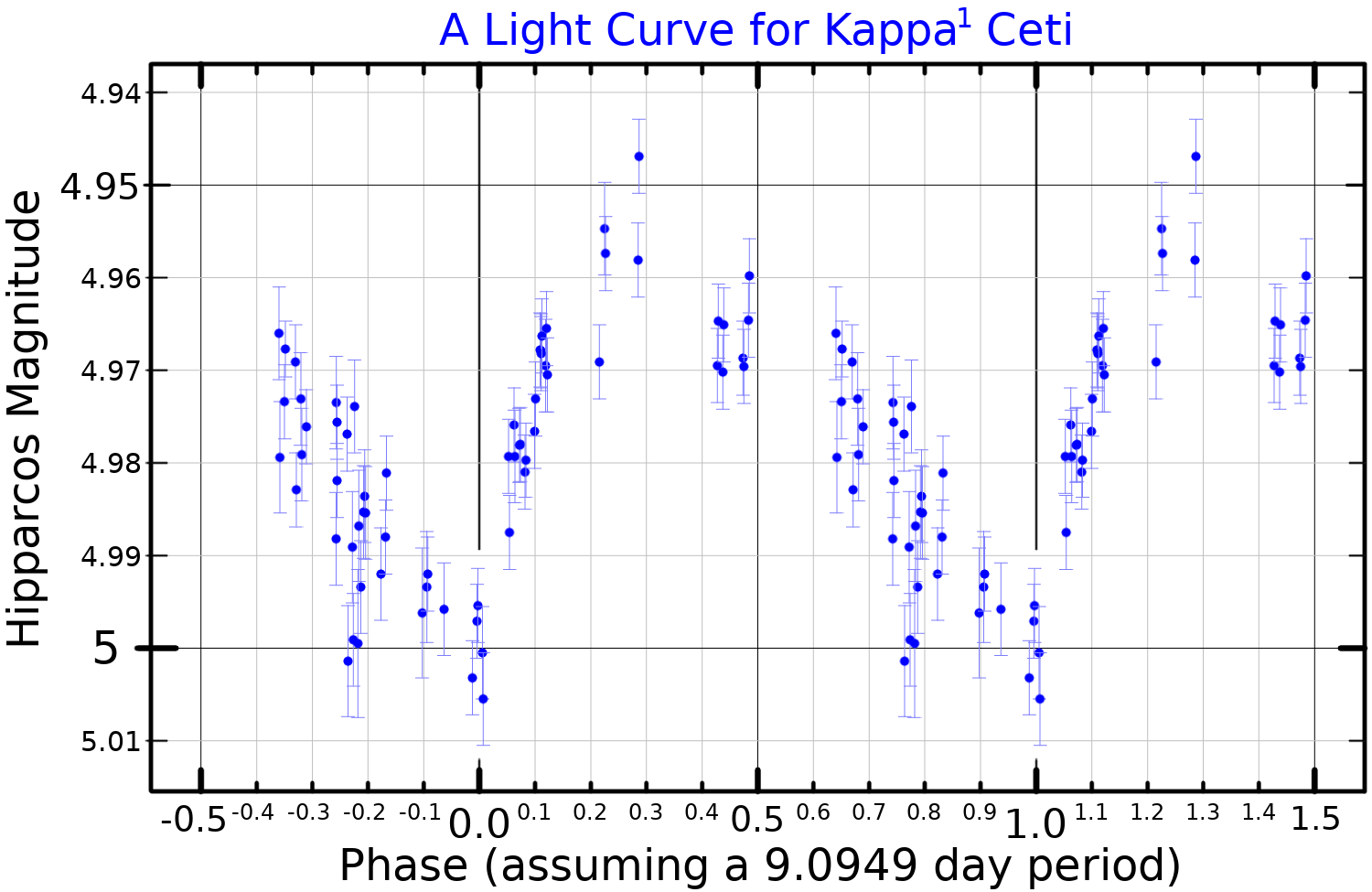
A light curve for Kappa^{1} Ceti, plotted from Hipparcos data

Kappa^{1} Ceti has a spectral class of G5Vv, classifying it as a G dwarf that fuses hydrogen into helium on its core. Since 1943, the spectrum of this star has served as one of the stable anchor points by which other stars are classified. The star has roughly the same mass as the Sun, with 95% of the Sun's radius and 88 percent of the luminosity. Its brightness varies by a few hundredths of a magnitude over a period of nine days and it is classified as a BY Draconis variable, a type of variable star where the brightness changes are due to spots on its surface as it rotates.

The rapid rotation rate of this star, approximately once every nine days, is indicative of a young star; its age is estimated to be between 300 and 400 million years. Due to starspots, the star varies slightly over approximately the same period. The variations in the period are thought to be caused by differential rotation at various latitudes, similar to what happens on the surface of the Sun. The starspots on Kappa^{1} Ceti range in latitude from 10° to 75°. The magnetic properties of this star make it "an excellent match for the Sun at a key point in the Earth's past".

According to recent hypotheses, unusually intense stellar flares from a solar twin star could be caused by the interaction of the magnetic field of a giant planet in a tight orbit with that star's own magnetic field. Some Sun-like stars of spectral class F8 to G8 have been found to undergo enormous magnetic outbursts to produce so-called superflares (coronal mass ejections) that release between 100 and 10 million times more energy than the largest flares ever observed on the sun, making them brighten briefly by up to 20 times.

Magnetic field measurements for κ^{1} Ceti were reported in 2016. These authors used spectropolarimetric observations from NARVAL to reconstruct the magnetic field topology and to quantitatively investigate the interactions between the stellar wind and a possible surrounding planetary system. A magnetic field detection was reported for κ^{1} Ceti, with an average field strength of 24 G, and a maximum value of 61 G. Stellar wind model shows a mass-loss rate of 9.7×10^{−13} M_{☉}·yr^{−1}, i.e., 50 times larger than the current solar wind mass-loss rate. Recent data constrained model of the star suggests that its mass loss rate is as high as 100 times of the solar mass-loss rate.

The space velocity components of this star are (U, V, W) = (−22.41, −4.27, −5.32) km/s. It is not known to be a member of a moving group of stars.

== See also ==
- List of star systems within 25–30 light-years
- List of nearest G-type stars
