= Stomach (Chinese constellation) =

Asterism

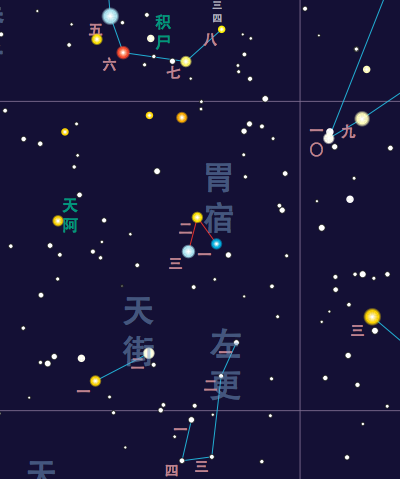
Wèi Xiù map

The Stomach mansion (胃宿, pinyin: Wèi Xiù) is one of the twenty-eight mansions of the Chinese constellations. It is one of the western mansions of the White Tiger.

== Asterisms ==
English name	Chinese name	European constellation	Number of stars	Representing
Stomach	胃	Aries	3	Stomach, fingers and granary
Celestial Foodstuff	天廩	Taurus	4	The barn
Circular Celestial Granary	天囷	Cetus	13	The round barn
Mausoleum	大陵	Perseus	8	The mausoleum
Celestial Boat	天船	Perseus	9	General big warships, or the ship has sailed galaxy
Heap of Corpses	積屍	Perseus/Camelopardalis	1	The body within the tomb
Stored Water	積水	Perseus	1	The stored-water ship
