= Cetus (constellation) =

Constellation straddling the celestial equator

- Constellation
- List of stars in Cetus
- Abbreviation: Cet
- Genitive: Ceti
- Pronunciation: /ˈsiːtəs/ SEE-təss, genitive /ˈsiːtaɪ/ SEE-tye
- Symbolism: the Whale, Shark, or Sea Monster
- Right ascension: 00^{h} 26^{m} 22.2486^{s}–03^{h} 23^{m} 47.1487^{s}
- Declination: 10.5143948°–−24.8725095°
- Area: 1231 sq. deg. (4th)
- Main stars: 14
- Bayer/Flamsteed stars: 88
- Stars brighter than 3.00^{m}: 2
- Stars within 10.00 pc (32.62 ly): 9
- Brightest star: Diphda (2.02^{m})
- Nearest star: Gliese 65
- Messier objects: 1
- Meteor showers: October Cetids; Eta Cetids; Omicron Cetids
- Bordering constellations: Aries; Pisces; Aquarius; Sculptor; Fornax; Eridanus; Taurus
- Visible at latitudes between +65° and −79°. Best visible at 21:00 (9 p.m.) during the month of November. It is also seen through autumn and winter months (from September through February in the Northern Hemisphere). Note: †Mira (ο Cet) is magnitude 2.0 at its brightest.

Cetus (/ˈsiːtəs/ SEE-təss) is a constellation, sometimes called 'the whale' in English. In Greek mythology, the Cetus (Ancient Greek: Κῆτος, romanized: Kêtos) was a large sea monster which both Perseus and Heracles needed to slay. Cetus is in the region of the sky that contains other water-related constellations: Aquarius, Pisces and Eridanus.

== Features ==
=== Ecliptic ===
Cetus is not among the 12 true zodiac constellations in the J2000 epoch, nor classical 12-part zodiac. The ecliptic passes less than 0.25° from one of its corners. Thus the Moon and planets will enter Cetus (occulting any stars as a foreground object) in 50% of their successive orbits briefly, and the southern part of the Sun appears in Cetus for about 14 hours each year on March 27 to 28. Many asteroids in belts have longer phases occulting the north-western part of Cetus, those with a slightly greater inclination to the ecliptic than the Moon and planets.

As seen from Mars, the ecliptic (apparent plane of the Sun and also the average plane of the planets which is almost the same) passes into it.

=== Stars ===
Bayer gave the most prominent stars Bayer designations Alpha through Psi. Later designated four stars as Phi and two stars as Kappa and Xi. Psi Ceti was dropped after it was found to be a duplicate of Xi Arietis.

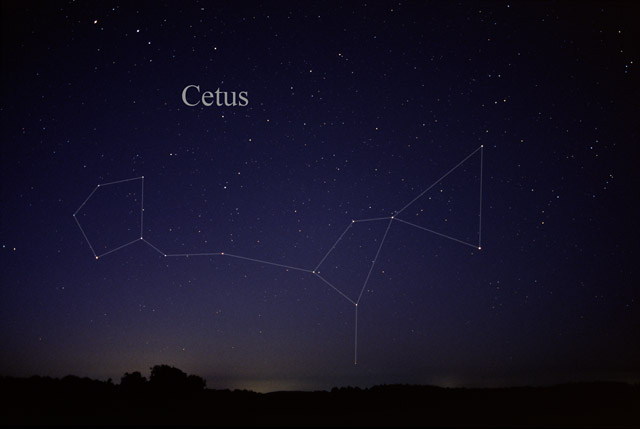
Cetus annotated with lines (a "stick figure") from a latitude further north (north of its declination), above a horizon, in conditions ideal for observation.

Mira ("wonderful", named by Bayer: Omicron Ceti, a star of the neck of the asterism) was the first variable star to be discovered and the prototype of its class, Mira variables. Over a period of 332 days, it reaches a maximum apparent magnitude of 3 - visible to the naked eye - and dips to a minimum magnitude of 10, invisible to the unaided eye. Its seeming appearance and disappearance gave it its name. Mira pulsates with a minimum size of 400 solar diameters and a maximum size of 500 solar diameters. 420 light-years from Earth, it was discovered by David Fabricius in 1596.

α Ceti, traditionally called Menkar ("the nose"), is a red-hued giant star of magnitude 2.5, 220 light-years from Earth. It is a wide double star; the secondary is 93 Ceti, a blue-white hued star of magnitude 5.6, 440 light-years away. β Ceti, officially named Diphda is the brightest star in the constellation of Cetus. It is an orange-hued giant star of magnitude 2.0, 96 light-years from Earth. The traditional name "Deneb Kaitos" means "the whale's tail". γ Ceti, Kaffaljidhma ("head of the whale") is a very close double star. The primary is a blue-hued star of magnitude 3.5, 82 light-years from Earth, and the secondary is an F-type star of magnitude 6.6. Tau Ceti is noted for being a near Sun-like star at a distance of 11.9 light-years. It is a yellow-hued main-sequence star of magnitude 3.5.

AA Ceti is a triple star system; the brightest member has a magnitude of 6.2. The primary and secondary are separated by 8.4 arcseconds at an angle of 304 degrees. The tertiary is not visible in telescopes. AA Ceti is an eclipsing variable star; the tertiary star passes in front of the primary and causes the system's apparent magnitude to decrease by 0.5 magnitudes. UV Ceti is an unusual binary variable star. At 8.7 light-years from Earth, the system consists of two red dwarfs. Both of magnitude 13. One of the stars is a flare star, which are prone to sudden, random outbursts that last several minutes; these increase the pair's apparent brightness significantly - as high as magnitude 7.

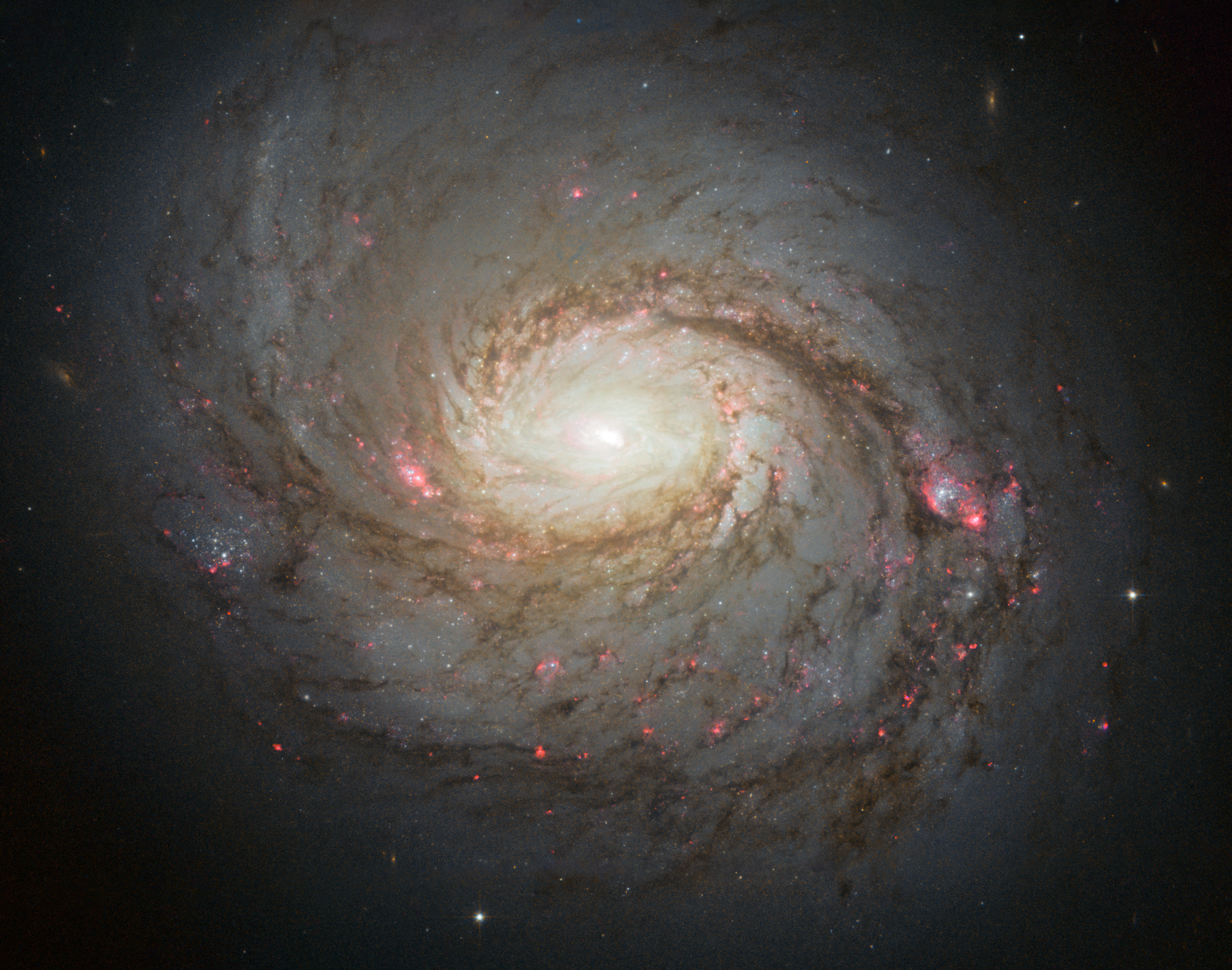
Messier 77 spiral galaxy - HST (Hubble Space Telescope).

=== Named stars ===
Name	Bayer designation	Origin	Meaning	Light Years
Menkar	α	Arabic	the Nostril [of Cetus]	250
Diphda	β	Arabic	the (Second) Frog	96.3
Kaffaljidhma	γ	Arabic	the Cut-short Hand	80
Sawyqed	δ	Egyptian	the Circle/Sheepfold	650
Baten Kaitos	ζ	Arabic	Belly of (Cetus)	253
Gajahmina	η	Sanskrit	Elephant fish	120.5
Tiancang	θ	Chinese	Square Celestial Granary	112
Bawy	ξ^{1}	Egyptian	the Two Souls	310
Mira	ο	Latin	Wonderful	300
Chugao	ρ	Chinese	Hay	560
Alnaamaat	υ	Arabic	the Ostriches Hen	318

=== Deep-sky objects ===
Cetus lies far from the galactic plane, so that many distant galaxies are visible, unobscured by dust from the Milky Way. Of these, the brightest is Messier 77 (NGC 1068), a 9th magnitude spiral galaxy near Delta Ceti. It appears face-on and has a clearly visible nucleus of magnitude 10. About 50 million light-years from Earth, M77 is also a Seyfert galaxy and thus a bright object in the radio spectrum. Recently, the galactic cluster JKCS 041 was confirmed to be the most distant cluster of galaxies yet discovered. The Pisces–Cetus Supercluster Complex is a galaxy filament that is one of the largest known structures in the observable Universe; it contains the Virgo Supercluster which contains the Local Group of Milky Way and other galaxies.

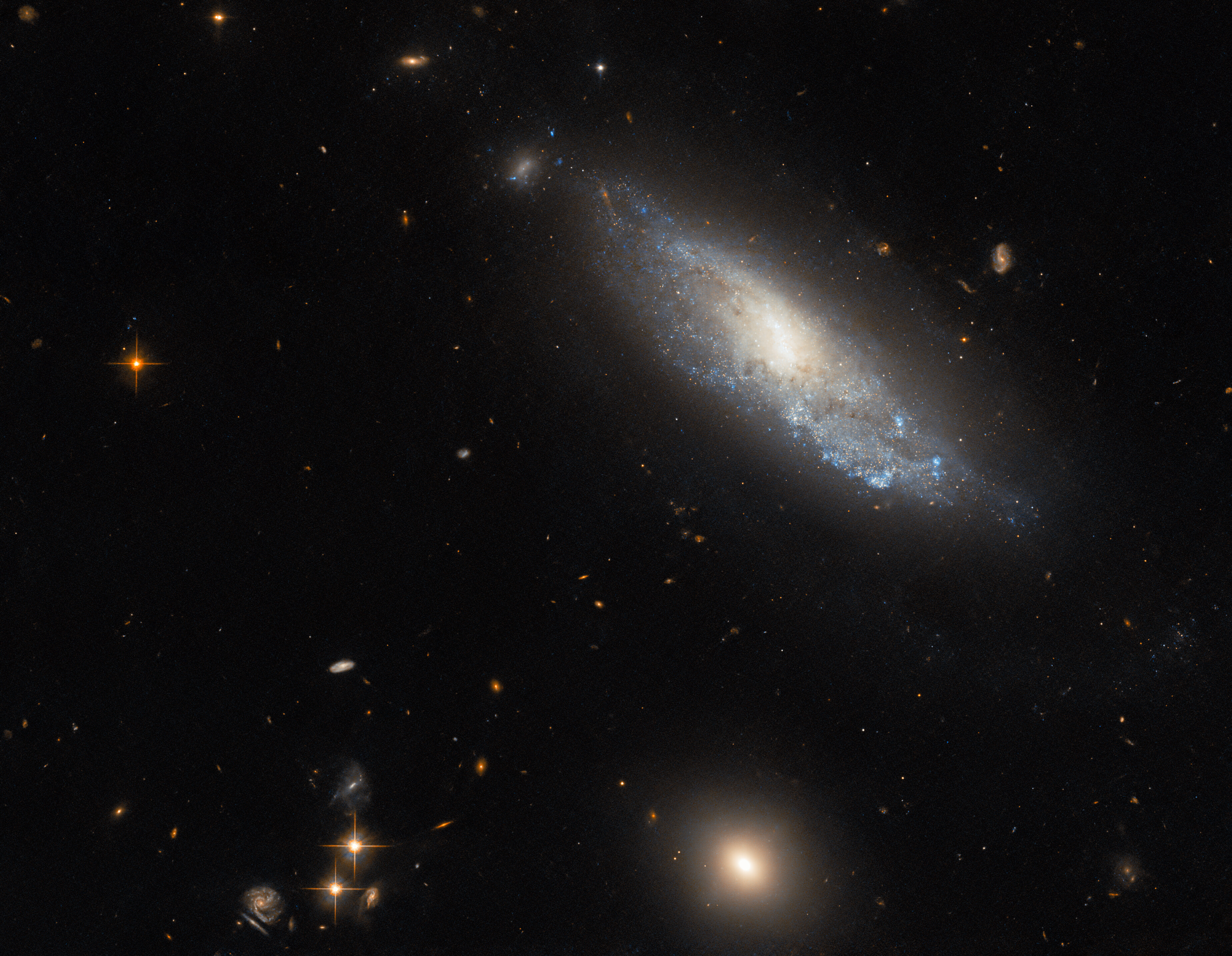
The spiral galaxy NGC 298 basks in this image from the NASA/ESA Hubble Space Telescope. NGC 298 lies around 89 million light-years away in the constellation Cetus, and appears isolated in this image — only a handful of distant galaxies and foreground stars accompany the lonely galaxy.

The massive cD galaxy Holmberg 15A is also found in Cetus; as are the spiral galaxy NGC 1042, the elliptical galaxy NGC 1052 and the ultra-diffuse galaxy NGC 1052-DF2.

IC 1613 (Caldwell 51) is an irregular dwarf galaxy near the star 26 Ceti and is a member of the Local Group.

NGC 246 (Caldwell 56), also called the "Cetus Ring", is a planetary nebula with a magnitude of 8.0 at 1600 light-years from Earth. Among some amateur astronomers, NGC 246 has garnered the nickname "Pac-Man Nebula" because of the arrangement of its central stars and the surrounding star field.

The Wolf–Lundmark–Melotte (WLM) is a barred irregular galaxy discovered in 1909 by Max Wolf, located on the outer edges of the Local Group. The discovery of the nature of the galaxy was accredited to Knut Lundmark and Philibert Jacques Melotte in 1926.

MoM-BH*-1 is an astronomical object classified as a little red dot. In 2026, it was proposed that MoM-BH*-1 is a black hole star.

UGC 1646, which is a spiral galaxy, also lies between the borders of the constellation. It is about 150 million light-years away from us. It can be seen near TYC 43-234-1 star.

== History and mythology ==
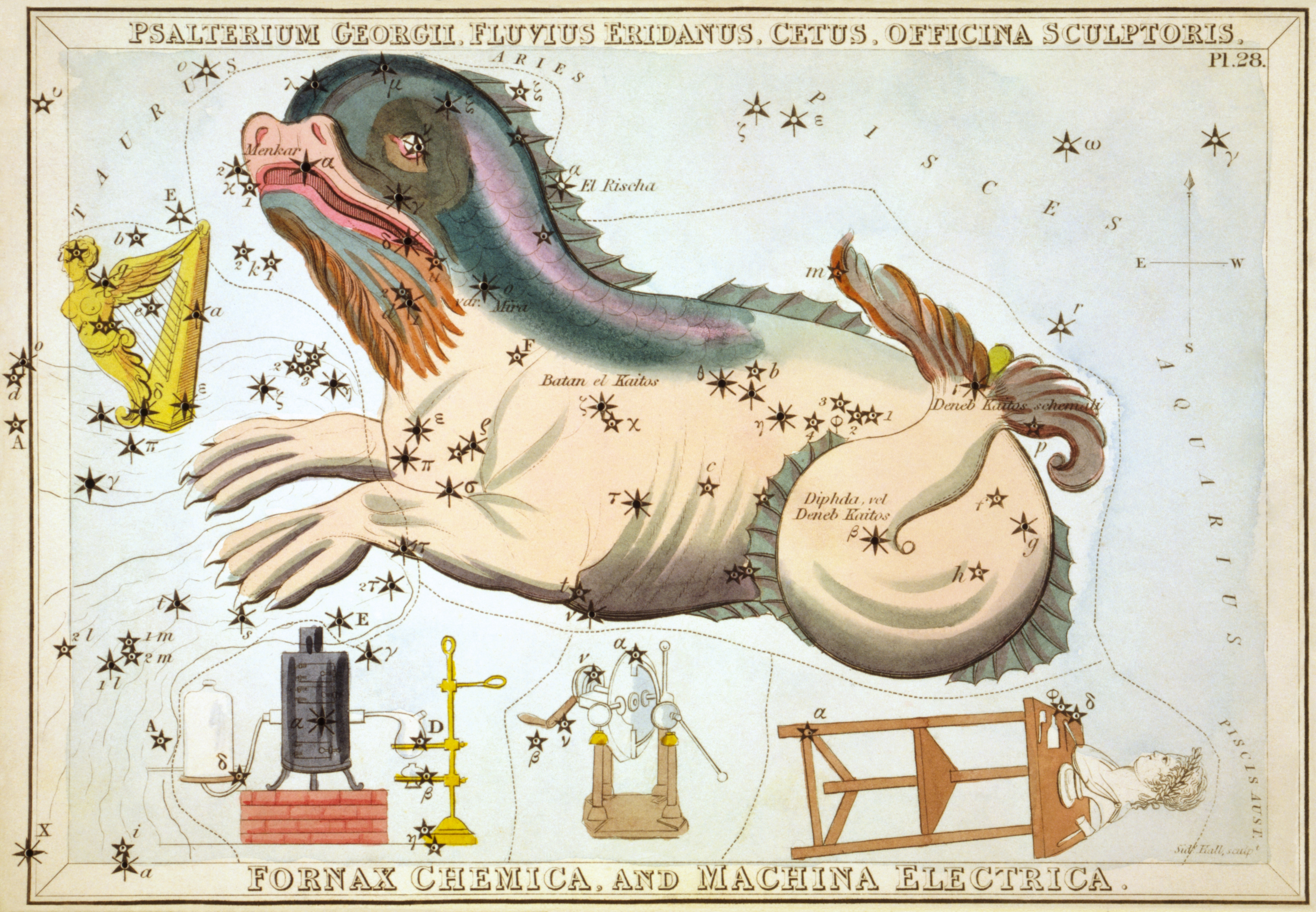
Cetus dominates this card from Urania's Mirror (1825) as if looking up towards the celestial sphere (east is left of frame). Uses the modern custom: celestial maps to be held skywards while facing south.

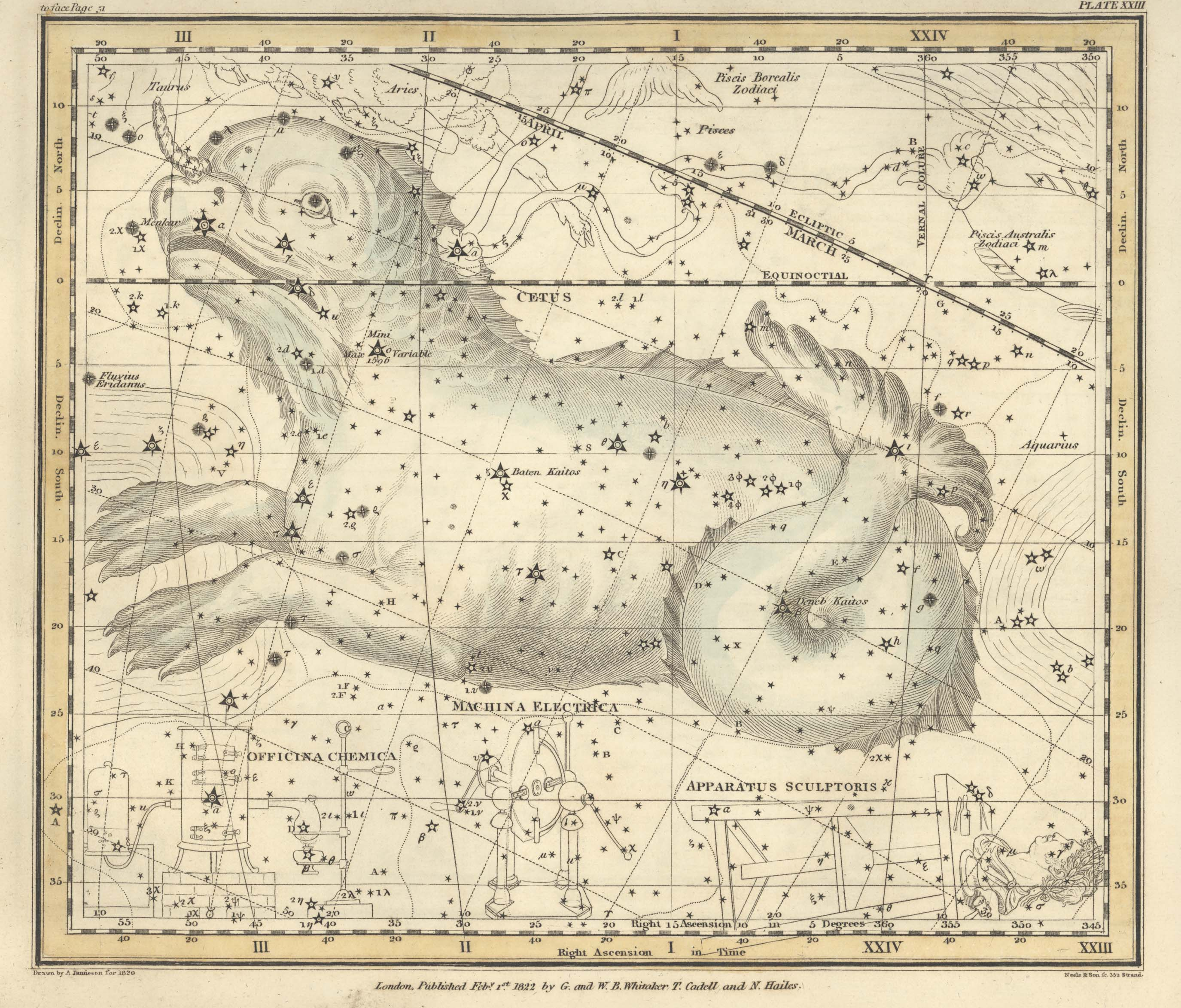
An alike depiction from Celestial Atlas (A. Jamieson) (1822)

Cetus may have originally been associated with a whale, which would have had mythic status amongst Mesopotamian cultures. It is often now called the Whale, though it is most strongly associated with Cetus the sea-monster, who was slain by Perseus as he saved the princess Andromeda from Poseidon's wrath. It is in the middle of "The Sea" recognised by mythologists, a set of water-associated constellations, its other members being Eridanus, Pisces, Piscis Austrinus and Aquarius. Despite this, there are no specific references to the stars of Cetus in Babylonian sources.

Cetus has been depicted in many ways throughout its history. In the 17th century, Cetus was depicted as a "dragon fish" by Johann Bayer, while both Willem Blaeu and Andreas Cellarius depicted Cetus as a whale-like creature in the same century. However, Cetus has also been variously depicted with animal heads attached to a piscine body.

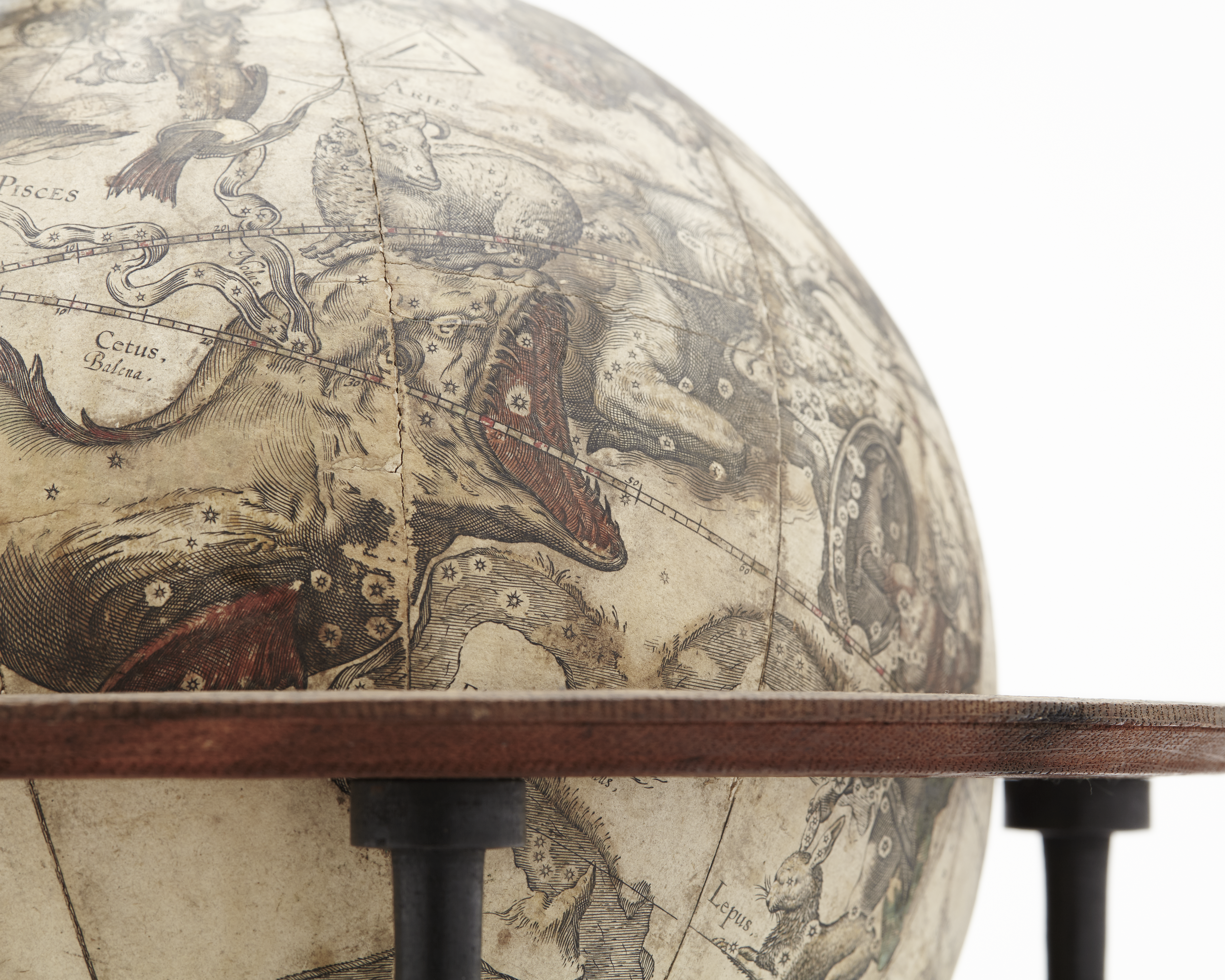
Cetus by Willem Blaeu, 1602.

=== In non-Western astronomy ===
In Chinese astronomy, the stars of Cetus are found among two areas: the Black Tortoise of the North (北方玄武, Běi Fāng Xuán Wǔ) and the White Tiger of the West (西方白虎, Xī Fāng Bái Hǔ).

The Tukano and Kobeua people of the Amazon used the stars of Cetus to create a jaguar, representing the god of hurricanes and other violent storms. Lambda, Mu, Xi, Nu, Gamma, and Alpha Ceti represented its head; Omicron, Zeta, and Chi Ceti represented its body; Eta Eri, Tau Cet, and Upsilon Cet marked its legs and feet; and Theta, Eta, and Beta Ceti delineated its tail.

In Hawaii, the constellation was called Na Kuhi, and Mira (Omicron Ceti) may have been called Kane.

== Namesakes ==
USS Cetus (AK-77) was a United States Navy Crater class cargo ship named after the constellation.

== See also ==
- Cetus (Chinese astronomy)
- Book of Jonah

== Bibliography ==
- Levy, David H. (2005). Deep Sky Objects. Prometheus Books. ISBN 1-59102-361-0.
- Makemson, Maud Worcester (1941). The Morning Star Rises: an account of Polynesian astronomy. Yale University Press. Bibcode:1941msra.book.....M.
- Ridpath, Ian; Tirion, Wil (2001), Stars and Planets Guide, Princeton University Press, ISBN 0-691-08913-2
- Ian Ridpath and Wil Tirion (2007). Stars and Planets Guide, Collins, London. ISBN 978-0-00-725120-9. Princeton University Press, Princeton. ISBN 978-0-691-13556-4
- Staal, Julius D.W. (1988). The New Patterns in the Sky. The McDonald and Woodward Publishing Company. ISBN 0-939923-04-1.
