= Libra in Chinese astronomy =

According to traditional Chinese uranography, the modern constellation Libra is located within the eastern quadrant of the sky, which is symbolized as the Azure Dragon of the East (東方青龍, Dōng Fāng Qīng Lóng).

The name of the western constellation in modern Chinese is 天秤座 (tiān chèng zuò), meaning "the celestial steelyard constellation".

== Stars ==
The map of Chinese constellations in constellation Libra area consists of:

| Four Symbols | Mansion (Chinese name) | Romanization | Translation | Asterisms (Chinese name) | Romanization | Translation | Western star name | Proper Name | Chinese star name | Romanization | Translation |
|---|---|---|---|---|---|---|---|---|---|---|---|
| Azure Dragon of the East (東方青龍) | 亢 | Kàng | Neck | | | | | | | | |
| Azure Dragon of the East (東方青龍) | 亢 | Kàng | Neck | 亢 | Kàng | Neck | 11 Lib | | 亢宿增八 | Kàngsùzēngbā | 8th additional star |
| Azure Dragon of the East (東方青龍) | 亢 | Kàng | Neck | 折威 | Shéwēi | Executions | | | | | |
| Azure Dragon of the East (東方青龍) | 亢 | Kàng | Neck | 折威 | Shéwēi | Executions | 3 Lib | | 折威三 | Shéwēisān | 3rd star |
| Azure Dragon of the East (東方青龍) | 亢 | Kàng | Neck | 折威 | Shéwēi | Executions | 4 Lib | | 折威五 | Shéwēiwu | 5th star |
| Azure Dragon of the East (東方青龍) | 亢 | Kàng | Neck | 折威 | Shéwēi | Executions | 12 Lib | | 折威六 | Shéwēiliù | 6th star |
| Azure Dragon of the East (東方青龍) | 亢 | Kàng | Neck | 折威 | Shéwēi | Executions | σ Lib | Brachium | 折威七 | Shéwēiqī | 7th star |
| Azure Dragon of the East (東方青龍) | 氐 | Dī | Root | 氐 | Dī | Root | | | | | |
| Azure Dragon of the East (東方青龍) | 氐 | Dī | Root | 氐 | Dī | Root | α^{2} Lib | Zubenelgenubi | | | |
| Azure Dragon of the East (東方青龍) | 氐 | Dī | Root | 氐 | Dī | Root | α^{2} Lib | Zubenelgenubi | 氐宿一 | Dīsùyī | 1st star |
| Azure Dragon of the East (東方青龍) | 氐 | Dī | Root | 氐 | Dī | Root | α^{2} Lib | Zubenelgenubi | 氐宿距星 | Dīsùjùxīng | Separated star |
| Azure Dragon of the East (東方青龍) | 氐 | Dī | Root | 氐 | Dī | Root | α^{2} Lib | Zubenelgenubi | 氐宿西南星 | Dīsùxīnánxīng | Southwestern star |
| Azure Dragon of the East (東方青龍) | 氐 | Dī | Root | 氐 | Dī | Root | α^{2} Lib | Zubenelgenubi | 天狗西星 | Tiāngǒuxīxīng | Star in the west of Celestial Dog constellation |
| Azure Dragon of the East (東方青龍) | 氐 | Dī | Root | 氐 | Dī | Root | α^{2} Lib | Zubenelgenubi | 南鳌 | Nánáo | Huge sea turtle in the south |
| Azure Dragon of the East (東方青龍) | 氐 | Dī | Root | 氐 | Dī | Root | ι Lib | | | | |
| Azure Dragon of the East (東方青龍) | 氐 | Dī | Root | 氐 | Dī | Root | ι Lib | | 氐宿二 | Dīsùèr | 2nd star |
| Azure Dragon of the East (東方青龍) | 氐 | Dī | Root | 氐 | Dī | Root | ι Lib | | 氐宿东南星 | Dīsùdōngnánxīng | Southeastern star |
| Azure Dragon of the East (東方青龍) | 氐 | Dī | Root | 氐 | Dī | Root | γ Lib | Zubenelhakrabi (for component A) | | | |
| Azure Dragon of the East (東方青龍) | 氐 | Dī | Root | 氐 | Dī | Root | γ Lib | Zubenelhakrabi (for component A) | 氐宿三 | Dīsùsān | 3rd star |
| Azure Dragon of the East (東方青龍) | 氐 | Dī | Root | 氐 | Dī | Root | γ Lib | Zubenelhakrabi (for component A) | 氐宿东北星 | Dīsùdōngběixīng | Northeastern star |
| Azure Dragon of the East (東方青龍) | 氐 | Dī | Root | 氐 | Dī | Root | β Lib | Zubenelschamali | | | |
| Azure Dragon of the East (東方青龍) | 氐 | Dī | Root | 氐 | Dī | Root | β Lib | Zubenelschamali | 氐宿四 | Dīsùsì | 4th star |
| Azure Dragon of the East (東方青龍) | 氐 | Dī | Root | 氐 | Dī | Root | β Lib | Zubenelschamali | 氐宿西北星 | Dīsùxīběixīng | Northwestern star |
| Azure Dragon of the East (東方青龍) | 氐 | Dī | Root | 氐 | Dī | Root | δ Lib | | 氐宿增一 | Dīsùzēngyī | 1st additional star |
| Azure Dragon of the East (東方青龍) | 氐 | Dī | Root | 天乳 | Tiānrǔ | Celestial Milk | 30 Ser | | 天乳增三 | Tiānrǔzēngsān | 3rd additional star |
| Azure Dragon of the East (東方青龍) | 氐 | Dī | Root | 天輻 | Tiānfú | Celestial Spokes | | | | | |
| Azure Dragon of the East (東方青龍) | 氐 | Dī | Root | 天輻 | Tiānfú | Celestial Spokes | τ Lib | | 天輻一 | Tiānfúyī | 1st star |
| Azure Dragon of the East (東方青龍) | 氐 | Dī | Root | 天輻 | Tiānfú | Celestial Spokes | υ Lib | | 天輻二 | Tiānfúèr | 2nd star |
| Azure Dragon of the East (東方青龍) | 氐 | Dī | Root | 天輻 | Tiānfú | Celestial Spokes | 36 Lib | | 天輻增一 | Tiānfúzēngyī | 1st additional star |
| Azure Dragon of the East (東方青龍) | 房 | Fáng | Room | 房 | Fáng | Room | | | | | |
| Azure Dragon of the East (東方青龍) | 房 | Fáng | Room | 房 | Fáng | Room | λ Lib | | 房宿增一 | Fángsùzēngyī | 1st additional star |
| Azure Dragon of the East (東方青龍) | 房 | Fáng | Room | 房 | Fáng | Room | 42 Lib | | 房宿增三 | Fángsùzēngsān | 3rd additional star |
| Azure Dragon of the East (東方青龍) | 房 | Fáng | Room | 罰 | Fá | Punishment | | | | | |
| Azure Dragon of the East (東方青龍) | 房 | Fáng | Room | 罰 | Fá | Punishment | 49 Lib | | 罰三 | Fásān | 3rd star |
| Azure Dragon of the East (東方青龍) | 房 | Fáng | Room | 西咸 | Xīxián | Western Door | | | | | |
| Azure Dragon of the East (東方青龍) | 房 | Fáng | Room | 西咸 | Xīxián | Western Door | 48 Lib | | 天輻二 | Xīxiánèr | 2nd star |
| Azure Dragon of the East (東方青龍) | 房 | Fáng | Room | 西咸 | Xīxián | Western Door | θ Lib | | 西咸三 | Xīxiánsān | 3rd star |
| Azure Dragon of the East (東方青龍) | 房 | Fáng | Room | 西咸 | Xīxián | Western Door | η Lib | | 西咸四 | Xīxiánsì | 4th star |
| Azure Dragon of the East (東方青龍) | 房 | Fáng | Room | 西咸 | Xīxián | Western Door | 50 Lib | | 西咸增一 | Xīxiánzēngyī | 1st additional star |
| Azure Dragon of the East (東方青龍) | 房 | Fáng | Room | 日 | Rì | Sun | | | | | |
| Azure Dragon of the East (東方青龍) | 房 | Fáng | Room | 日 | Rì | Sun | κ Lib | | 日 | Rì | (One star of) |
| Azure Dragon of the East (東方青龍) | 房 | Fáng | Room | 日 | Rì | Sun | 41 Lib | | 日增一 | Rìzēngyī | 1st additional star |

== See also ==
- Chinese astronomy
- Traditional Chinese star names
- Chinese constellations
