= List of stars in Libra =

This is the list of notable stars in the constellation Libra, sorted by decreasing brightness.

Name	B	F	Var	HD	HIP	RA	Dec	vis. mag.	abs. mag.	Dist. (ly)	Sp. class	Notes
β Lib	β	27		135742	74785	15^{h} 17^{m} 00.47^{s}	−09° 22′ 58.3″	2.61	−0.84	160	B8V	Zubeneschamali; suspected variable
α^{2} Lib	α^{2}	9		130841	72622	14^{h} 50^{m} 52.78^{s}	−16° 02′ 29.8″	2.75	0.88	77	A3IV	Zubenelgenubi; spectroscopic binary; suspected variable; member of the α Lib system
σ Lib	σ	20		133216	73714	15^{h} 04^{m} 04.26^{s}	−25° 16′ 54.7″	3.25	−1.51	292	M3/M4III	previously γ Scorpii, Brachium; semiregular variable, V_{max} = 3.2^{m}, V_{min} = 3.46^{m}, P = 20 d
υ Lib	υ	39		139063	76470	15^{h} 37^{m} 01.46^{s}	−28° 08′ 06.3″	3.60	−0.28	195	K3III	previously o Scorpii
τ Lib	τ	40		139365	76600	15^{h} 38^{m} 39.38^{s}	−29° 46′ 39.7″	3.66	−2.01	445	B2.5V	
γ Lib	γ	38		138905	76333	15^{h} 35^{m} 31.54^{s}	−14° 47′ 22.4″	3.91	0.56	152	K0III	Zubenelhakrabi, has two planets
θ Lib	θ	46		142198	77853	15^{h} 53^{m} 49.48^{s}	−16° 43′ 46.6″	4.13	0.64	163	K0III	
16 Lib		16		132052	73165	14^{h} 57^{m} 11.06^{s}	−04° 20′ 45.9″	4.47	2.24	91	F0V	
ι^{1} Lib	ι^{1}	24		134759	74392	15^{h} 12^{m} 13.31^{s}	−19° 47′ 29.9″	4.54	−0.77	376	Asp...	α^{2} CVn variable, V_{max} = 4.53^{m}, V_{min} = 4.56^{m}, P = 3.10 d
37 Lib		37		138716	76219	15^{h} 34^{m} 10.52^{s}	−10° 03′ 50.3″	4.61	2.30	94	K1IV	
κ Lib	κ	43		139997	76880	15^{h} 41^{m} 56.82^{s}	−19° 40′ 42.9″	4.75	−0.69	400	K5III	Rì (日), suspected variable
δ Lib	δ	19		132742	73473	15^{h} 00^{m} 58.39^{s}	−08° 31′ 08.2″	4.91	0.06	304	B9.5V	Zuben Elakribi or Mululizu; Algol variable, V_{max} = 4.91^{m}, V_{min} = 5.9^{m}, P = 2.33 d
ε Lib	ε	31		137052	75379	15^{h} 24^{m} 11.93^{s}	−10° 19′ 18.8″	4.92	2.37	106	F5IV	
11 Lib		11		130952	72631	14^{h} 51^{m} 01.02^{s}	−02° 17′ 55.9″	4.93	0.82	216	G8...	RS CVn variable, V_{max} = 4.91^{m}, V_{min} = 4.95^{m}, P = 60.55 d
48 Lib		48	FX	142983	78207	15^{h} 58^{m} 11.38^{s}	−14° 16′ 45.5″	4.95	−1.03	513	B8Ia/Iab	γ Cas variable, V_{max} = 4.74^{m}, V_{min} = 4.96^{m}
42 Lib	χ	42		139663	76742	15^{h} 40^{m} 16.91^{s}	−23° 49′ 05.0″	4.97	−0.37	381	K3III	suspected variable
λ Lib	λ	45		142096	77811	15^{h} 53^{m} 20.06^{s}	−20° 10′ 01.2″	5.03	−0.16	356	B3V	α^{2} CVn variable, ΔV = 0.02^{m}, P = 3.31 d
36 Lib		36		138688	76259	15^{h} 34^{m} 37.31^{s}	−28° 02′ 48.9″	5.13	−0.14	369	K2/K3III	
α^{1} Lib	α^{1}	8		130819	72603	14^{h} 50^{m} 41.26^{s}	−15° 59′ 49.5″	5.15	3.28	77	F3V	spectroscopic binary; member of the α Lib system
HR 5780			IU	138764	76243	15^{h} 34^{m} 26.53^{s}	−09° 11′ 00.1″	5.16	0.00	351	B6IV	slowly pulsating B star, V_{max} = 5.14^{m}, V_{min} = 5.19^{m}, P = 1.26 d
ν Lib	ν	21		133774	73945	15^{h} 06^{m} 37.62^{s}	−16° 15′ 24.3″	5.19	−1.66	765	K5III	Zuben Hakrabim
12 Lib		12		131430	72929	14^{h} 54^{m} 20.14^{s}	−24° 38′ 31.7″	5.27	−0.09	384	K2/K3III	
μ Lib	μ	7		130559	72489	14^{h} 49^{m} 19.09^{s}	−14° 08′ 56.3″	5.32	1.03	235	Ap	α^{2} CVn variable
HD 126218				126218	70469	14^{h} 24^{m} 48.66^{s}	−24° 48′ 22.6″	5.34	−0.10	400	K0III	
41 Lib	φ	41		139446	76628	15^{h} 38^{m} 54.51^{s}	−19° 18′ 06.2″	5.36	0.27	340	G8III/IV	
η Lib	η	44		140417	77060	15^{h} 44^{m} 04.42^{s}	−15° 40′ 21.6″	5.41	2.14	147	A6IV	Zuben Hakrabi
49 Lib	(φ)	49		143333	78400	16^{h} 00^{m} 19.98^{s}	−16° 31′ 56.6″	5.47	2.89	107	F7V	variable star, ΔV = 0.004^{m}, P = 0.45 d
ξ^{2} Lib	ξ^{2}	15		131918	73133	14^{h} 56^{m} 46.11^{s}	−11° 24′ 35.0″	5.48	−0.61	538	K4III	
HD 138413				138413	76106	15^{h} 32^{m} 36.71^{s}	−19° 40′ 13.3″	5.50	1.29	227	A2IV	
HD 132833				132833	73497	15^{h} 01^{m} 19.81^{s}	−02° 45′ 17.5″	5.52	−0.67	564	M0III	suspected variable
HD 135534				135534	74732	15^{h} 16^{m} 23.03^{s}	−22° 23′ 57.9″	5.52	−0.41	500	K2III	
ζ^{4} Lib	ζ^{4}	35		138485	76126	15^{h} 32^{m} 55.23^{s}	−16° 51′ 10.1″	5.53	−1.33	769	B3V	suspected variable
30 Ser		(30)		141378	77464	15^{h} 48^{m} 56.81^{s}	−03° 49′ 06.7″	5.53	2.07	160	A5IV	
50 Lib	ψ	50		143459	78436	16^{h} 00^{m} 47.64^{s}	−08° 24′ 40.8″	5.53	−0.21	459	A0Vs	
HD 136479				136479	75127	15^{h} 21^{m} 07.64^{s}	−05° 49′ 29.4″	5.54	0.96	269	K1III	
ζ^{1} Lib	ζ^{1}	32		137744	75730	15^{h} 28^{m} 15.40^{s}	−16° 42′ 59.1″	5.64	−1.58	908	K4III	On 24 December 2031 it will be occulted by Venus over the North Pacific, Alaska, Northern Canada.
HD 130529				130529	72488	14^{h} 49^{m} 18.76^{s}	−24° 15′ 05.3″	5.68	−1.99	1113	K3III+...	
4 Lib		4		129433	71974	14^{h} 43^{m} 13.57^{s}	−24° 59′ 51.8″	5.70	0.21	409	B9.5V	53 Hydrae
Gliese 570			KX	131977	73184	14^{h} 57^{m} 27.35^{s}	−21° 24′ 55.7″	5.72	6.86	19	K4V	BY Dra variable, ΔV = 0.04^{m}
HD 136956				136956	75352	15^{h} 23^{m} 52.26^{s}	−12° 22′ 09.9″	5.72	−0.61	603	G8III	
HD 134373				134373	74239	15^{h} 10^{m} 18.65^{s}	−26° 19′ 57.4″	5.75	0.05	450	K0III	
ξ^{1} Lib	ξ^{1}	13		131530	72934	14^{h} 54^{m} 22.91^{s}	−11° 53′ 54.0″	5.78	0.54	365	G7III	
HD 139254				139254	76532	15^{h} 37^{m} 48.06^{s}	−23° 08′ 29.5″	5.79	1.18	272	K0III	
HD 129944				129944	72210	14^{h} 46^{m} 06.75^{s}	−23° 09′ 10.3″	5.80	0.55	366	K0III	
ζ^{3} Lib	ζ^{3}	34		138137	75944	15^{h} 30^{m} 40.39^{s}	−16° 36′ 34.0″	5.82	−0.37	564	K0III	
HD 139329				139329	76569	15^{h} 38^{m} 16.24^{s}	−21° 00′ 58.2″	5.82	1.06	292	K0III	
HD 135051				135051	74539	15^{h} 13^{m} 53.32^{s}	−26° 11′ 36.8″	5.84	−1.41	918	G8/K0II	
18 Lib		18		132345	73310	14^{h} 58^{m} 53.64^{s}	−11° 08′ 37.9″	5.88	0.95	316	K3III-IV	
47 Lib		47		142378	77939	15^{h} 55^{m} 00.37^{s}	−19° 22′ 58.4″	5.95	−0.46	623	B2/B3V	suspected variable
HD 130157				130157	72310	14^{h} 47^{m} 13.66^{s}	−21° 19′ 29.6″	6.05	−2.73	1863	K4/K5III	
ι^{2} Lib	ι^{2}	25		134967	74493	15^{h} 13^{m} 19.22^{s}	−19° 38′ 50.8″	6.07	1.93	219	A2V	
HD 132375				132375	73309	14^{h} 58^{m} 52.99^{s}	−04° 59′ 20.4″	6.08	3.37	114	F8V	
HD 142703			HR	142703	78078	15^{h} 56^{m} 33.33^{s}	−14° 49′ 45.7″	6.12	2.48	173	A2Ib/II	δ Sct variable, ΔV = 0.02^{m}, P = 0.06 d
HD 133670				133670	73927	15^{h} 06^{m} 27.10^{s}	−22° 01′ 54.1″	6.13	2.24	195	K0III	suspected variable
ο Lib	ο	29		136407	75118	15^{h} 21^{m} 01.36^{s}	−15° 32′ 54.2″	6.14	2.45	178	F2V	
HD 130557				130557	72449	14^{h} 48^{m} 54.10^{s}	−00° 50′ 51.7″	6.15	0.98	353	B9Vsvar...	
28 Lib		28		136366	75110	15^{h} 20^{m} 53.68^{s}	−18° 09′ 30.6″	6.16	−0.27	631	G8II/III	
26 Lib		26		135230	74600	15^{h} 14^{m} 33.77^{s}	−17° 46′ 06.7″	6.18	−1.80	1283	B9III	
HD 139160				139160	76503	15^{h} 37^{m} 28.51^{s}	−26° 16′ 47.3″	6.19	−0.14	600	B9IV	
HD 128429				128429	71469	14^{h} 36^{m} 59.80^{s}	−12° 18′ 19.1″	6.20	3.66	88	F6V + WD	Blue straggler
HD 138105				138105	75939	15^{h} 30^{m} 36.25^{s}	−20° 43′ 42.5″	6.20	1.92	234	A3V	suspected variable
HD 141853				141853	77689	15^{h} 51^{m} 38.41^{s}	−14° 08′ 00.8″	6.20	−0.43	692	G8III	
2 Lib		2		126035	70336	14^{h} 23^{m} 25.63^{s}	−11° 42′ 50.0″	6.22	1.19	330	G7III	
HD 140986				140986	77287	15^{h} 46^{m} 45.43^{s}	−06° 07′ 13.3″	6.24	−1.05	937	K0III	
HD 138488				138488	76143	15^{h} 33^{m} 09.53^{s}	−24° 29′ 25.2″	6.26	1.22	331	A3/5V +A9/F2	
10 Lib		10		131027	72702	14^{h} 51^{m} 51.31^{s}	−18° 21′ 19.2″	6.27	−0.97	913	K0II/III	
HD 135367				135367	74623	15^{h} 14^{m} 50.61^{s}	−05° 30′ 09.3″	6.28	−0.95	911	K3III	
HD 138268				138268	76033	15^{h} 31^{m} 43.45^{s}	−20° 09′ 53.4″	6.28	1.96	239	A5V	
HD 140301				140301	77007	15^{h} 43^{m} 24.86^{s}	−15° 02′ 34.8″	6.30	0.80	411	K0III	
HD 139290				139290	76567	15^{h} 38^{m} 15.80^{s}	−28° 12′ 23.8″	6.32	0.14	562	K1III	
HD 142640				142640	78059	15^{h} 56^{m} 14.41^{s}	−14° 23′ 57.2″	6.32	2.29	208	F6V	
5 Lib		5		129978	72194	14^{h} 45^{m} 57.78^{s}	−15° 27′ 34.4″	6.33	−1.33	1109	K2III	
HD 139518				139518	76666	15^{h} 39^{m} 21.39^{s}	−23° 09′ 00.6″	6.33	1.47	306	B9.5V	
HD 130325				130325	72373	14^{h} 47^{m} 54.92^{s}	−12° 50′ 23.2″	6.34	1.12	361	K0III	
HD 132953				132953	73571	15^{h} 02^{m} 08.59^{s}	−07° 34′ 31.1″	6.38	0.13	580	A5V	
22 Lib		22		133800	73953	15^{h} 06^{m} 49.10^{s}	−16° 29′ 03.6″	6.41	0.90	413	A1V	
HD 129980				129980	72217	14^{h} 46^{m} 10.92^{s}	−21° 10′ 32.6″	6.43	3.30	138	G2V	
HD 137798				137798	75790	15^{h} 28^{m} 58.69^{s}	−28° 52′ 00.5″	6.43	2.51	198	G0V	
23 Lib		23		134987	74500	15^{h} 13^{m} 28.93^{s}	−25° 18′ 33.0″	6.45	4.40	84	G5V	has two planets (b & c)
HD 139461				139461	76603	15^{h} 38^{m} 40.07^{s}	−08° 47′ 29.1″	6.45	4.47	81	F6V	
30 Lib		30		136801	75294	15^{h} 23^{m} 01.78^{s}	−15° 08′ 02.7″	6.46	−0.43	780	K4III	suspected variable
HD 134946				134946	74490	15^{h} 13^{m} 17.43^{s}	−24° 00′ 29.8″	6.47	0.96	412	B8III	
HD 126251				126251	70452	14^{h} 24^{m} 40.90^{s}	−11° 40′ 10.7″	6.49	1.72	293	F4III	
HD 126363				126363	70501	14^{h} 25^{m} 17.63^{s}	−13° 21′ 11.4″	6.49	0.48	520	K2III	
HD 127964				127964	71295	14^{h} 34^{m} 50.72^{s}	−20° 26′ 21.8″	6.49	0.12	613	A3V	
HD 134758				134758	74391	15^{h} 12^{m} 12.04^{s}	−19° 06′ 23.1″	6.49	0.33	555	K4III	
HD 140722				140722	77235	15^{h} 46^{m} 12.89^{s}	−28° 03′ 41.1″	6.49	2.33	222	F0V	
HD 136646				136646	75272	15^{h} 22^{m} 45.19^{s}	−29° 20′ 30.9″	6.50	0.83	443	K0III	
HD 133112				133112	73608	15^{h} 02^{m} 44.9^{s}	−03° 01′ 53″	6.60		323	A6IV-V	WASP-189, has a planet (b)
17 Lib		17		132230	73249	14^{h} 58^{m} 13.42^{s}	−11° 09′ 17.1″	6.61	1.30	376	A1V	
33 Lib	ζ^{2}	33	GZ	137949	75848	15^{h} 29^{m} 34.78^{s}	−17° 26′ 27.4″	6.69	1.94	291	Ap	rapidly oscillating Ap star, V_{max} = 6.66^{m}, V_{min} = 6.71^{m}, P = 4.85 d
HD 141569				141569	77542	15^{h} 49^{m} 57.75^{s}	−03° 55′ 16.3″	7.12		379	A0Ve	has a protoplanetary disk
3 Lib		3		128756	71652	14^{h} 39^{m} 22.01^{s}	−25° 01′ 43.0″	7.20		663	K0III	
HD 140283				140283	76976	15^{h} 43^{m} 03.10^{s}	−10° 56′ 00.6″	7.21		190	sdF3	one of the oldest stars known; suspected variable
FY Lib			FY	132112	73213	14^{h} 57^{m} 46.55^{s}	−12° 26′ 15.3″	7.23		1310	M5III	semiregular variable, V_{max} = 6.5^{m}, V_{min} = 7.78^{m}, P = 179.7 d
KU Lib			KU	128987	71743	14^{h} 40^{m} 31.11^{s}	−16° 12′ 33.4″	7.23		77	G8V	BY Dra variable; member of the α Lib system
ES Lib			ES	135681	74765	15^{h} 16^{m} 48.61^{s}	−13° 02′ 21.1″	7.25		378	A3III	β Lyr variable, V_{max} = 7.1^{m}, V_{min} = 7.57^{m}, P = 0.88 d
HD 141937				141937	77740	15^{h} 52^{m} 17.55^{s}	−18° 26′ 09.8″	7.25	4.63	109	G2/G3V	has a planet (b)
HD 134796				134796	74401	15^{h} 12^{m} 20.95^{s}	−16° 24′ 39.86″	7.28	7.26		B9V	
HD 136905			GX	136905	75325	15^{h} 23^{m} 26.06^{s}	−06° 36′ 37.8″	7.31		378	G8IVp	RS CVn variable, ΔV = 0.08^{m}, P = 11.13 d
HD 134214			HI	134214	74145	15^{h} 09^{m} 02.41^{s}	−13° 59′ 58.7″	7.48		335	Ap...	rapidly oscillating Ap star, ΔV = 0.007^{m}
HM Lib			HM	137613	75694	15^{h} 27^{m} 48.32^{s}	−25° 10′ 10.1″	7.54		1940	C	PV Tel variable, V_{max} = 7.42^{m}, V_{min} = 7.63^{m}
HD 134701				134701		15^{h} 11^{m} 51.55^{s}	−16° 36′ 40.16″	7.70	8.20		F5V	
HD 133803				133803	73990	15^{h} 07^{m} 15.0^{s}	−29° 30′ 16″	8.12		408	A9V	has two planets
HD 133131 A				133131	73674	15^{h} 03^{m} 35.8^{s}	−27° 50′ 28″	8.4			G2V	has two planets
HD 133131 B				133131	73674	15^{h} 03^{m} 35.8^{s}	−27° 50′ 28″	8.42			G2	has a planet
HD 128598				128598	71567	14^{h} 38^{m} 11.78^{s}	−14° 57′ 17.2″	8.76		3080	K1IV/V	used to discover Uranus's rings
UZ Lib			UZ		76086	15^{h} 32^{m} 23.21^{s}	−08° 32′ 00.9″	9.12		525	K0III	RS CVn variable, V_{max} = 8.85^{m}, V_{min} = 9.62^{m}, P = 4.77 d
HD 134440				134440	74234	15^{h} 10^{m} 12.97^{s}	−16° 27′ 47.5″	9.43		93	K2V	peculiar metal abundance; suspected variable
EH Lib			EH		73315	14^{h} 58^{m} 55.92^{s}	−00° 56′ 53.1″	9.83	2.00	1,197	A5V	δ Sct variable, V_{max} = 9.35^{m}, V_{min} = 10.08^{m}, P = 0.09 d
HD 139139				139139		15^{h} 37^{m} 06.21^{s}	−19° 08′ 33.1″	9.84		351	G3/5V	has unusual dimming periods
VZ Lib			VZ		76050	15^{h} 31^{m} 51.76^{s}	−15° 41′ 10.2″	10.27		667	F5	W UMa variable, V_{max} = 10.13^{m}, V_{min} = 10.63^{m}, P = 0.36 d
Gliese 581			HO		74995	15^{h} 19^{m} 26.82^{s}	−07° 43′ 20.2″	10.55	11.57	20	M3	BY Dra variable, V_{max} = 10.56^{m}, V_{min} = 10.58^{m}; has 3 planets (b, c, e)
WASP-109						15^{h} 28^{m} 13.0^{s}	−16° 24′ 39″	11.4	3.81	1076	F4V	has a transiting planets
HE 1523-0901						15^{h} 26^{m} 01.07^{s}	−09° 11′ 38.9″	11.50				one of the oldest stars known
HP Lib			HP			15^{h} 35^{m} 53.08^{s}	−14° 13′ 12.2″	13.65			Bpec	AM CVn star and V777 Her variable, V_{max} = 13.65^{m}, V_{min} = 13.8^{m}, P = 0.013 d
K2-315						15^{h} 12^{m} 5.06^{s}	−20° 06′ 29.39″	17.67	13.89	185.3	M3.5V	has a transiting planet (b)
2MASS 1507-1627						15^{h} 07^{m} 47.69^{s}	−16° 27′ 38.6″	22.14		23.9	L5.5	brown dwarf
GW Lib			GW			15^{h} 19^{m} 55.35^{s}	−25° 00′ 24.5″					WZ Sge variable
WISE 1541-2250						15^{h} 41^{m} 51.66^{s}	−22° 50′ 25.0″			18.6	Y0	brown dwarf
IC 1059						14^{h} 50^{m} 42.54^{s}	−00° 52′ 33.1″					a galaxy discovered in 1893 by Stephane Javelle
Table legend: • Name = Proper name • B = Bayer designation • F or/and G. = Flamsteed designation or Gould designation • Var = Variable star designation • HD = Henry Draper Catalogue designation number • HIP = Hipparcos Catalogue designation number • RA = Right ascension for the Epoch/Equinox J2000.0 • Dec = Declination for the Epoch/Equinox J2000.0 • vis. mag. = visual magnitude (m or m_{v}), also known as apparent magnitude • abs. mag. = absolute magnitude (M_{v}) • Dist. (ly) = Distance in light-years from Earth • Sp. class = Spectral class of the star in the stellar classification system • Notes = Common name(s) or alternate name(s); comments; notable properties [for example: multiple star status, range of variability if it is a variable star, exoplanets, etc.]

== See also ==
- List of stars by constellation

Color=Blue
