= Zubenhakrabi =

Zubenhakrabi (or Zuben Hakrabi) is the traditional name for some stars in the constellation Libra.

It can refer to:

- γ Lib in Bode's small star atlas, Vorstellung der Gestirne.
- η Lib in Burritt's star map.
- ν Lib in Bečvář's star catalogue.
- σ Lib in Bayer's Uranometria.
- υ Lib in a Japanese guide book of the constellations. It is probably a typographical error.
