= Vishakha =

16th lunar mansion of Hindu astronomy

Vishākhā (विशाखा), meaning "forked, having many branches", is the 16th nakshatra in Indian astronomy. It corresponds to the stars α, β, γ and ι Librae in the constellation Libra. In Hindu mythology, Vishākhā is a daughter of the king Daksha. She is one of the twenty-seven daughters of Daksha, who married the moon-god Chandra. Vishākhā is the sixteenth nakshatra of the zodiac, ruled by the planet Jupiter, Brihaspati or Guru. It is also supposed to be the birth star of the goddess Sita.

In Modern Astronomy, these stars are known as the Alpha-Librae, Beta-Librae, Gamma-Librae, and Iota-Librae. A part of this asterism lies in the Zodiac sign of Scorpio. Among these four stars, the Alpha-Librae and Beta Librae are the brightest. The best and the easiest way to spot these stars is to locate them below the bright star Spica. The ancient seers saw these stars forming the shape of a Forked branch and associated it with the abode of the Gods under the Rulership of Lord Indra.

== See also ==
- Gopi, Vishaka is also one of the main gopis in Krishna lila, Krishna's muses in Goloka Vrndavana
