= 54 Hydrae =

Star in the constellation Hydra

- Location of 54 Hydrae (circled in red)

Observation data Epoch J2000 Equinox J2000
- Constellation: Hydra
- Right ascension: 14^{h} 46^{m} 00.08^{s}
- Declination: −25° 26′ 35.44″
- Apparent magnitude (V): 4.95 (5.2 + 7.4)

Characteristics
- Evolutionary stage: AGB+main sequence
- Spectral type: F2III+G1V
- B−V color index: +0.35

Astrometry
Radial velocity (R_{v})	5.4±3.8 km/s
Proper motion (μ)	RA: 151.50 mas/yr Dec.: 107.28 mas/yr
Parallax (π)	33.02±0.92 mas
Distance	99 ± 3 ly (30.3 ± 0.8 pc)
Absolute magnitude (M_{V})	2.73

Details

54 Hya A
Mass	1.35±0.15 M_{☉}
Radius	1.71 R_{☉}
Temperature	7,158 K
Rotational velocity (v sin i)	112.5 km/s

54 Hya B
Mass	1.3±0.1 M_{☉}
Radius	1.2±0.1 R_{☉}

Other designations
- m Hya, 54 Hya, CD−24°11661, GJ 9494, HD 129926, HIP 72197, HR 5497, SAO 182855, ADS 9375, WDS J14460-2527

Database references
SIMBAD	data

54 Hydrae, also known by its Bayer designation m Hydrae, is a binary star 99 light-years from Earth, easily divisible in small amateur telescopes. The primary is a yellow star of magnitude 5.2 and the secondary is a purple star of magnitude 7.4. They are separated by 8.4 arcseconds.

== Nomenclature ==
54 Hydrae is the star’s Flamsteed designation, while it also has the Bayer designation m Hydrae, which was not given by Johann Bayer, but by Benjamin Apthorp Gould, which he included in his Uranometria Argentina. It should not be confused with 42 Hydrae, which has the Bayer designation Mu Hydrae. Before Gould, it was also included in the obsolete constellation of Turdus Solitarius, where it was designated Delta (δ) Turdii Solitarii.

In Chinese, 折威 (Shé Wēi), meaning Executions (asterism), refers to an asterism consisting of σ Librae, 50 Hydrae, 3 Librae, 4 Librae and 12 Librae. It was considered as an “extra” star, and was given the Chinese name 折威增三 (Shé Wēi Zēng Sān, English: the Third Extra Star of Executions).
