= NGC 5915 =

Galaxy in the constellation Libra

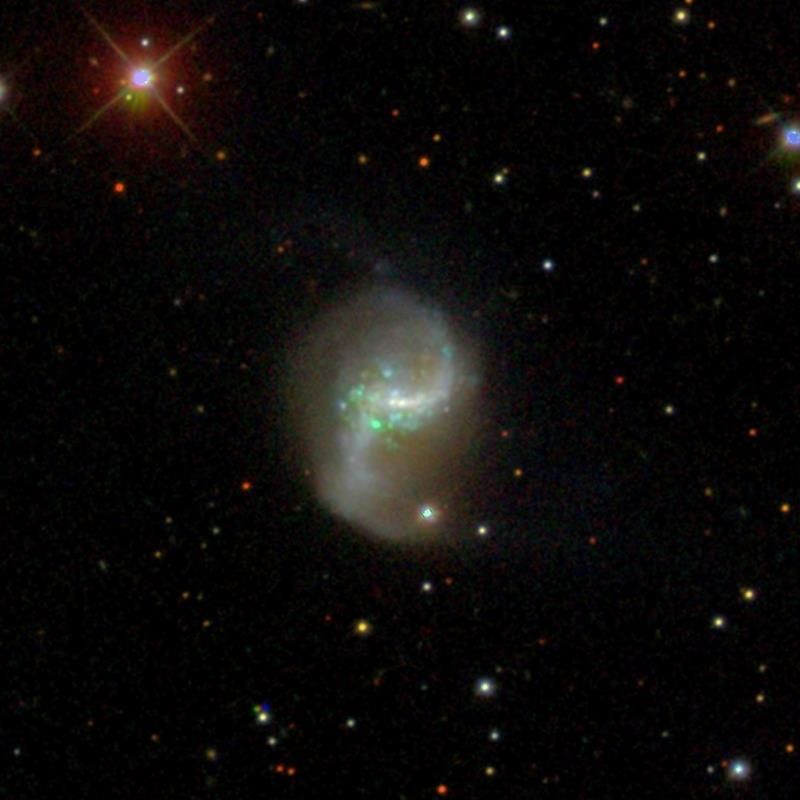
- NGC 5915 imaged by SDSS

Observation data (J2000 epoch)
- Constellation: Libra
- Right ascension: 15^{h} 21^{m} 33.0984^{s}
- Declination: −13° 05′ 30.278″
- Redshift: 0.007580
- Heliocentric radial velocity: 2272 ± 3 km/s
- Distance: 117.8 ± 8.3 Mly (36.12 ± 2.54 Mpc)
- Apparent magnitude (V): 12.3

Characteristics
- Type: SB(s)ab pec
- Size: ~39,600 ly (12.15 kpc) (estimated)
- Apparent size (V): 1.6′ × 1.1′

Other designations
- IRAS 15187-1254, 2MASX J15213307-1305302, UGCA 407, MCG -02-39-019, PGC 54816

NGC 5915 is a barred spiral galaxy in the constellation of Libra. Its velocity with respect to the cosmic microwave background is 2449 ± 13 km/s, which corresponds to a Hubble distance of 36.12 ± 2.54 Mpc (~118 million light-years). It was discovered by British astronomer John Herschel on 5 June 1836.

NGC 5915 forms a galaxy triplet due to gravitational interactions with NGC 5916 and NGC 5916A (also known as PGC 54779).

== Supernova ==
One supernova has been observed in NGC 5915: SN 2023cpt (Type Ic, mag 17.1) was discovered by ATLAS on 27 February 2023.

== See also ==
- List of NGC objects (5001–6000)
