= HD 135485 =

Star in the constellation Libra

Observation data Epoch J2000.0 Equinox J2000.0
- Constellation: Libra
- Right ascension: 15^{h} 15^{m} 45.257^{s}
- Declination: −14° 41′ 34.52″
- Apparent magnitude (V): 8.16

Characteristics
- Evolutionary stage: horizontal branch
- Spectral type: B3V or B5IIp
- B−V color index: −0.072±0.012
- Variable type: constant

Astrometry
Radial velocity (R_{v})	−3.2±0.6 km/s
Proper motion (μ)	RA: 0.253 mas/yr Dec.: −34.906 mas/yr
Parallax (π)	4.4756±0.0377 mas
Distance	729 ± 6 ly (223 ± 2 pc)
Absolute magnitude (M_{V})	−2.03±0.11

Details
Mass	6.03±0.66 M_{☉}
Radius	2.65 R_{☉}
Luminosity	417 L_{☉}
Surface gravity (log g)	4.00±0.25 cgs
Temperature	19,000 K
Rotational velocity (v sin i)	2.00±0.50 km/s
Age	12.0±1.5 Myr

Trundle et al (2001)
Mass	0.5 M_{☉}
Radius	1.2 R_{☉}
Luminosity	68^{+26}_{−21} L_{☉}
Surface gravity (log g)	4.0 cgs
Temperature	15,500 K

Other designations
- BD−14°4160, HD 135485, HIP 118149, SAO 159132, PPM 229981

Database references
SIMBAD	data

HD 135485 is a solitary, peculiar star in the southern constellation of Libra. It has an apparent visual magnitude of 8.16, which is too faint to be visible to the typical naked eye. Based on a parallax measurement of 4.48 mas, it is located at a distance of approximately 729 light-years (223 pc). The star is drifting closer to the Sun with a line of sight velocity component of −3 km/s.

== Observations ==
In 1956, spectra of this star was found to show abnormally strong absorption lines of helium, suggesting a helium overabundance about ten times the normal level. A 1973 study of a model atmosphere showed a much lower helium abundance; probably less than double the solar proportion. At this point, abundances of other elements suggested this may be a young, super-metal rich star, a hypothesis later refuted. Further study showed the helium abundance is actually near normal, but the star shows unusually high metal abundances (where 'metal' refers to elements more massive than helium). It displays general enrichment in all metals except nickel.

HD 135485 has been assigned a stellar classification of B5 IIp, presenting as a peculiar B-type bright giant. (N. Houk and M. Smith-Moore (1978) found a more ordinary class of B3V.) Its position on the HR diagram matches an evolved star lying close to the blue horizontal branch (BHB). In that case, it is most likely a core helium fusing star with a hydrogen fusing envelope. A noticeably larger abundance of nitrogen suggests that material from carbon-nitrogen processing has made its way to the surface, and the star may have undergone helium flashes in the core region. A 2007 study found evidence of vertical stratification of nitrogen and sulfur, with abundances increasing toward the upper atmosphere. This was the first BHB star in which vertical stratification of metals has been observed.

This is most likely an evolved star on the blue horizontal branch. It may have formed in a metal-rich region of the Milky Way, which could explain some of the abundance anomalies. The high abundance of helium may indicate this is a young blue horizontal branch star which has not yet settled its helium component. In the 2001 study by Trundle and associates, the BHB star has half the mass of the Sun and 120% of the Solar radius. It is radiating 68 times the luminosity of the Sun from its photosphere at an effective temperature of 15,500 K.

Other studies assume it is a main sequence star matching the class found by Houk and Smith-Moore in 1978. Under this model, the star is an estimated 12 million years old with a slow projected rotational velocity of 2 km·s^{−1}. It has six times the mass of the Sun and 2.7 times the Sun's radius. This star is radiating 417 times the luminosity of the Sun at an effective temperature of 19,000 K.
