= NGC 5898 =

Galaxy in the constellation Libra

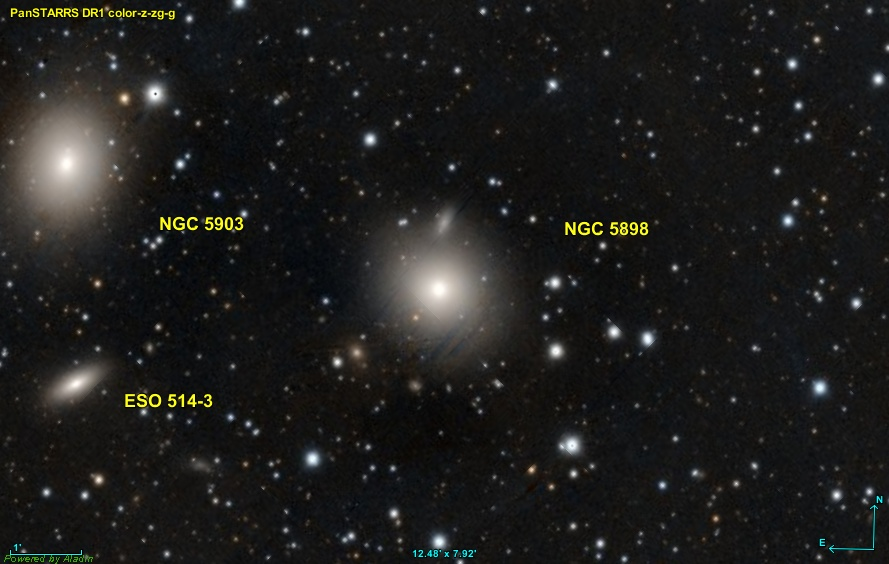
- NGC 5898 imaged by Pan-STARRS

Observation data (J2000 epoch)
- Constellation: Libra
- Right ascension: 15^{h} 18^{m} 13.5598^{s}
- Declination: −24° 05′ 52.259″
- Redshift: 0.007078
- Heliocentric radial velocity: 2122 ± 4 km/s
- Distance: 110.7 ± 7.8 Mly (33.93 ± 2.38 Mpc)
- Apparent magnitude (V): 11.4

Characteristics
- Type: E0
- Size: ~125,200 ly (38.39 kpc) (estimated)
- Apparent size (V): 2.7′ × 2.6′

Other designations
- ESO 514- G 002, 2MASX J15181355-2405526, UGCA 404, MCG -04-36-006, PGC 54625

NGC 5898 is an elliptical galaxy in the constellation of Libra. Its velocity with respect to the cosmic microwave background is 2301 ± 13 km/s, which corresponds to a Hubble distance of 33.93 ± 2.38 Mpc (~111 million light-years). It was discovered by German-British astronomer William Herschel on 21 May 1784.

== NGC 5903 group ==
According to A. M. Garcia, NGC 5898 is part of the five member NGC 5903 Group (also known as LGG 398). The other four galaxies are NGC 5903, IC 4538, ESO 514-3, and UGCA 408.

== Supernova ==
One supernova has been observed in NGC 5898: SN 2023mkt (Type Ia, mag. 18.1665) was discovered by the Automatic Learning for the Rapid Classification of Events (ALeRCE) on 7 July 2023.

== Image gallery ==
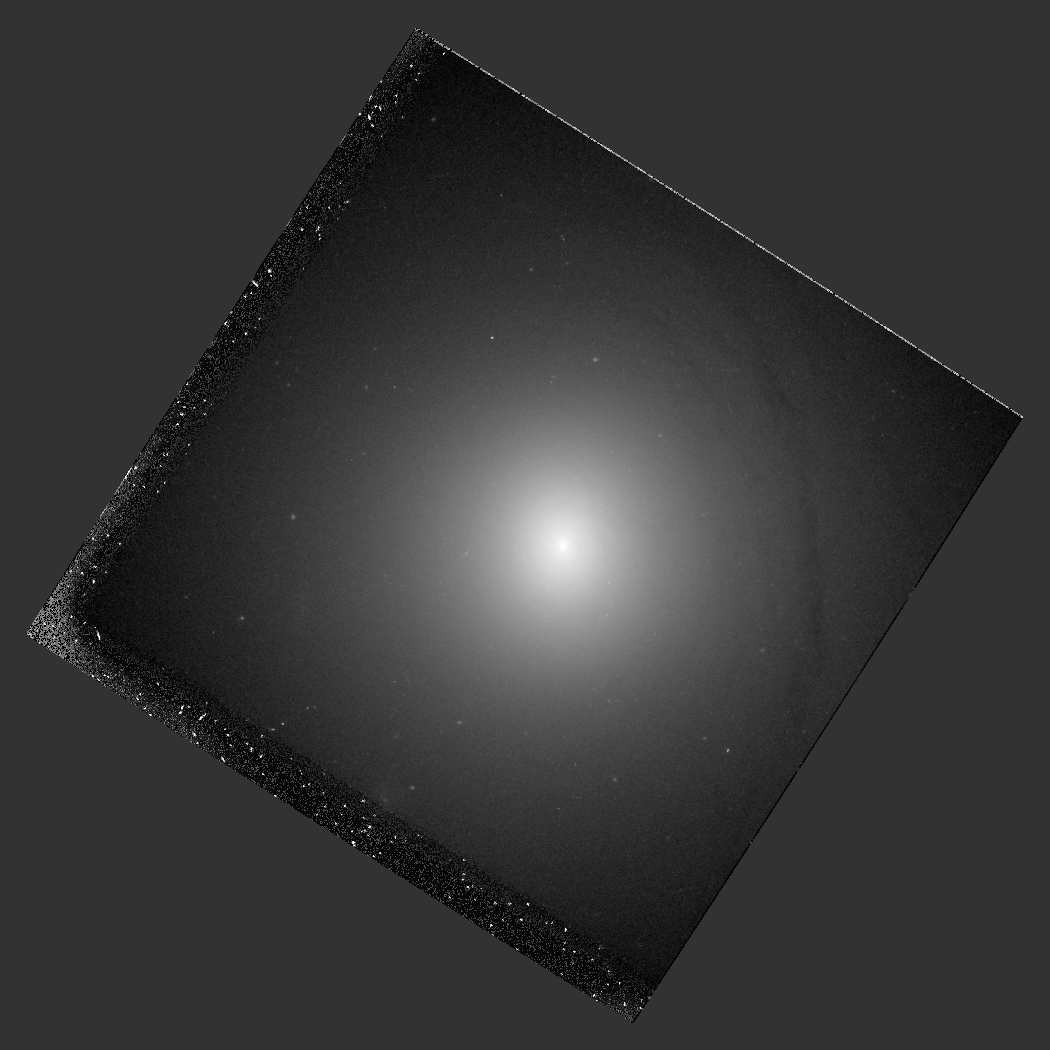
NGC 5898 imaged by the Hubble Space Telescope

== See also ==
- List of NGC objects (5001–6000)
