= NGC 5605 =

Galaxy in the constellation Libra

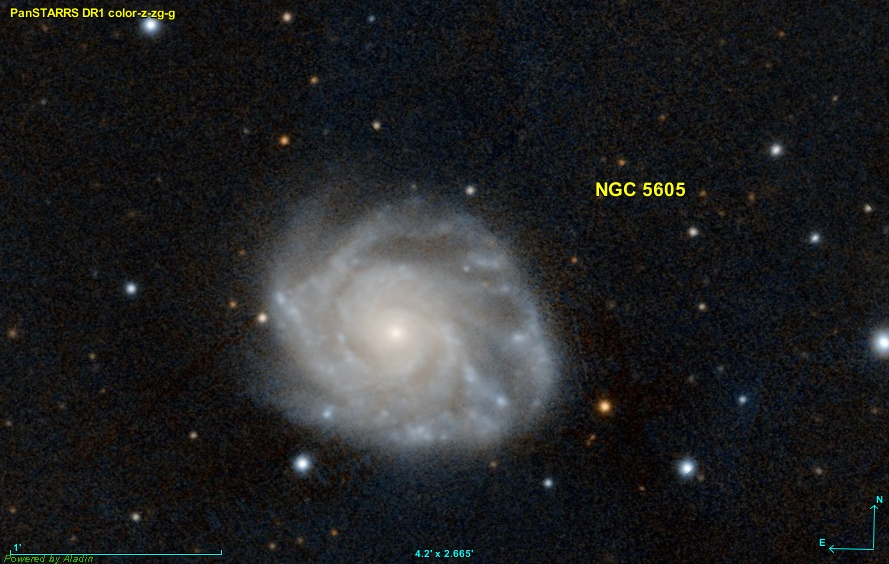
- NGC 5605 imaged by Pan-STARRS

Observation data (J2000 epoch)
- Constellation: Libra
- Right ascension: 14^{h} 25^{m} 07.57^{s}
- Declination: −13° 09′ 46.8″
- Redshift: 0.011294
- Heliocentric radial velocity: 3386 ± 3 km/s
- Distance: 174.9 ± 12.3 Mly (53.61 ± 3.76 Mpc)
- Apparent magnitude (V): 12.3

Characteristics
- Type: (R')SAB(rs)c pec?
- Size: ~119,000 ly (36.50 kpc) (estimated)
- Apparent size (V): 1.5′ × 1.3′
- Notable features: The only galaxy known to have 3 supernovae visible at the same time

Other designations
- IRAS 14223-1256, 2MASX J14250757-1309467, MCG -02-37-003, PGC 51492

NGC 5605 is an intermediate spiral galaxy in the constellation of Libra. Its velocity with respect to the cosmic microwave background is 3635 ± 18 km/s, which corresponds to a Hubble distance of 174.9 ± 12.3 Mly (53.61 ± 3.76 Mpc). In addition, three non redshift measurements give a farther distance of 194.72 ± 0.68 Mly (59.700 ± 0.208 Mpc). The galaxy was discovered by German-British astronomer William Herschel on 11 May 1784.

The SIMBAD database lists NGC 5605 as a Seyfert II Galaxy, i.e. it has a quasar-like nucleus with very high surface brightnesses whose spectra reveal strong, high-ionisation emission lines, but unlike quasars, the host galaxy is clearly detectable. A local active galactic nucleus (AGN) survey reported NGC 5605 to host an AGN.

== Unique Trio of Supernovae ==
NGC 5605 is the only galaxy known where three supernovae were visible at the same time:

- SN 2022bn (Type Ib, mag. 18.55) was discovered by ATLAS on 5 January 2022.
- SN 2022ec (Type II, mag. 18.835) was discovered by ATLAS on 7 January 2022.
- SN 2022pv (Type II, mag. 19.165) was discovered by ATLAS on 13 January 2022.

== See also ==
- List of NGC objects (5001–6000)
