= Iota2 Librae =

A-type main-sequence star

Iota^{2} Librae
- Location of ι^{2} Librae (circled in red)

Observation data Epoch J2000 Equinox J2000
- Constellation: Libra
- Right ascension: 15^{h} 13^{m} 19.1935^{s}
- Declination: −19° 38′ 51.274″
- Apparent magnitude (V): 6.066

Characteristics
- Evolutionary stage: main sequence
- Spectral type: A2V

Astrometry
Radial velocity (R_{v})	−7.61±0.56 km/s
Proper motion (μ)	RA: −50.808 mas/yr Dec.: −33.581 mas/yr
Parallax (π)	11.2409±0.2282 mas
Distance	290 ± 6 ly (89 ± 2 pc)
Absolute magnitude (M_{V})	+1.86

Details
Mass	1.84 M_{☉}
Radius	2.314 R_{☉}
Luminosity	20.33 L_{☉}
Surface gravity (log g)	3.95 cgs
Temperature	8,526±290 K
Age	363 Myr

Other designations
- Iota2 Librae, 25 Librae, BD−19 4055, HD 134967, HIP 74493, HR 5656, PPM 229920, TIC 70367797, TYC 6178-684-1, 2MASS J15131920-1938512

Database references
SIMBAD	data

Iota^{2} Librae is a faint, sixth-magnitude star situated in the zodiacal constellation Libra. It has a stellar spectrum of A2V. This indicate that it is in the main sequence. Parallax measurements imply a distance of 89 parsecs (290 ly) from Earth. At this distance, interstellar extinction caused by interveining gas and dust makes Iota^{2} Librae 0.44 magnitudes fainter as seen from Earth. The star is currently drifting closer at 7.61 km/s.

This A-type star has 84% more mass and 2.3 times the radius of the Sun. It is about 360 million years old, is 20 times more energetic and 48% hotter than the Sun, its surface has an effective temperature of 8,526 K. It is also known by its Flamsteed designation 25 Librae, Iota^{2} Librae is the Bayer designation, with the corresponding Greek letter being shared with another star, Iota^{1} Librae. Other designations, like HD 134967 or HR 5656, are catalogue entries.
