= HD 141569 =

A-type star in the constellation Libra

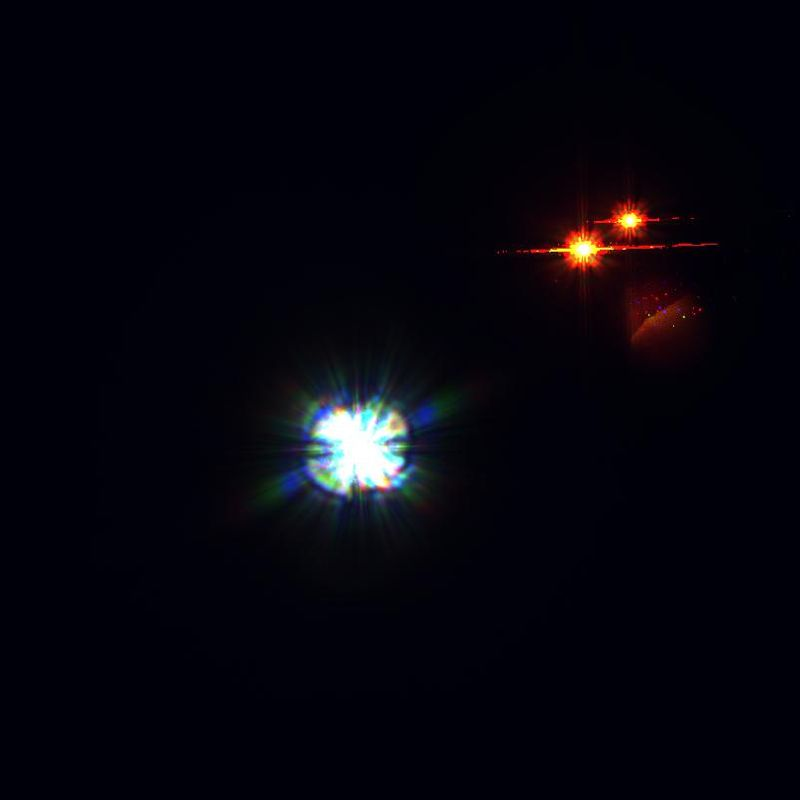
- HD 141569 and its two companions taken by the Hubble Space Telescope in 2002

Observation data Epoch J2000.0 Equinox ICRS
- Constellation: Libra
- Right ascension: 15^{h} 49^{m} 57.7483^{s}
- Declination: −03° 55′ 16.342″
- Apparent magnitude (V): 7.12

Characteristics
- Spectral type: A2 Ve

Astrometry
Proper motion (μ)	RA: −17.420(31) mas/yr Dec.: −19.113(26) mas/yr
Parallax (π)	8.9597±0.0293 mas
Distance	364 ± 1 ly (111.6 ± 0.4 pc)
Absolute magnitude (M_{V})	+1.80

Details
Mass	3.1 M_{☉}
Luminosity	24.2 L_{☉}
Temperature	10,500 K
Age	5 million years

Other designations
- BD−03°3833, HIP 77542, SAO 140789, Gaia DR3 4399438153527026176

Database references
SIMBAD	data

HD 141569 is an isolated Herbig Ae/Be star of spectral class A2Ve approximately 364 light-years away in the constellation of Libra. The primary star has two red dwarf companions (orbiting each other) at about nine arcseconds. In 1999, a protoplanetary disk was discovered around the star. A gap in the disk led to speculation about a possible extrasolar planet forming in the disk.

In November 2019, researchers studied HD 141569A (pre-main sequence B9.5 star) and made the first polarimetric detection of the inner ring circling the star. This may help better determine essential features of planetary development. According to the researchers, "Considering resolved imaging data from other high-contrast facilities, the HD 1415169A debris disc shapes up to be made of at least three, and potentially four nested rings, with spiral structures on the three spatially resolved rings [...] As such, it is an excellent laboratory for studying dynamically perturbed discs."

== Planetary system ==
The HD 141569 planetary system
Companion (in order from star)	Mass	Semimajor axis (AU)	Orbital period (days)	Eccentricity	Inclination (°)	Radius
Inner dust ring	0.7–1.3 AU				—	—
Inner disk	86 AU				—	—
b (unconfirmed)	—	225	—	—	—	—
Outer disk	250 AU				—	—

=== Protoplanetary disk ===
In January 1999, NASA announced a protoplanetary disk around HD 141569. The Hubble Space Telescope showed that the disk appears to come in two parts (inner and outer). It superficially resembles the largest gap in Saturn's rings (known as the Cassini division).

The vast disk is 75 billion miles across (13 times the diameter of Neptune's orbit). The inner edge of the gap is 21 billion miles from the star. The relatively narrow gap lies approximately halfway between the inner and outer edges of the disk. Though already a fully formed star, HD 141569 is relatively young, probably only 1% through its lifetime as a stable star. The star is nearly three times more massive and 22 times brighter than the Sun.

HD 141569 was first identified as a source that might have a disk in 1986 as a result of observations done with the Infrared Astronomical Satellite (IRAS). Thermal radiation emitted by the warmed dust was observed in images taken in June 2016 at the W. M. Keck Observatory.

Light from the central star which was reflected from dust particles in the disk was captured by Hubble's Near Infrared Camera and Multi-Object Spectrometer (NICMOS) at a wavelength of 1.1 micrometres. At the distance of HD 141569, the crisp resolution of the telescope and camera combination reveals structures as small as 1 billion miles across. Dust disks surrounding newly forming stars are common, but only a small number of adult stars are known to have disks; of these, only a handful have been imaged. Astronomers believe these disks must form and/or be replenished when older rocks and debris collide and break up into small particles.

The inner disk is strongly asymmetric for reasons unknown as of 2021.

About 1 AU from the star, a faint dust ring was detected in 2021.

=== Possible planet ===
The gap in the disk leads to the conclusion of a protoplanet in formation around the star. The planet does not have to be in the gap, however. It could either be sweeping up the dust and rocks from the disk as it travels in its orbit around the star, or the gravity of the planet could knock the dust out of one part of the disk.

== See also ==
- HR 4796
- Vega
