= K2-315b =

Warm terrestrial exoplanet orbiting K2-315

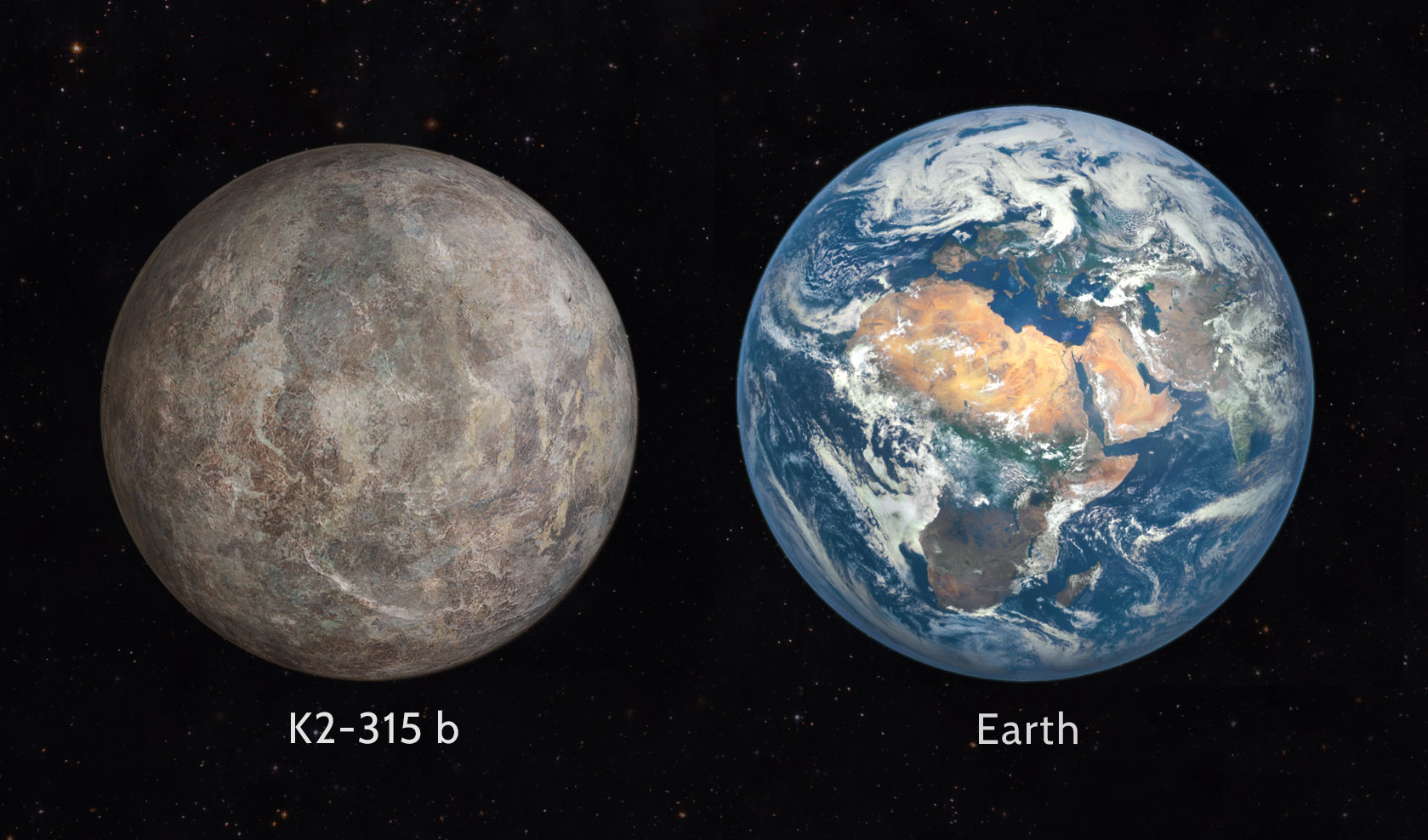
- Size comparison of the planet K2-315b (artistic concept) with Earth

Discovery
- Discovered by: Kepler (K2)
- Discovery date: 2020
- Detection method: Transit

Orbital characteristics
- Semi-major axis: 0.02±0.00 AU
- Orbital period (sidereal): 3.14±0.00 d
- Inclination: 88.7°±0.2°

Physical characteristics
- Mean radius: 0.95±0.06 R_{🜨}
- Temperature: 460 ± 5 K (186.85 ± 5.00 °C; 368.33 ± 9.00 °F)

K2-315b is an exoplanet located 185.3 light-years away from Earth in the southern zodiac constellation Libra. It orbits the red dwarf K2-315.

== Discovery ==
K2-315b was discovered in 2020 by astronomers in an observatory using the Kepler space telescope. It is also nicknamed the "Pi Planet" or "Pi Earth" because it takes approximately 3.14 days to orbit the host star.

== Physical properties ==
The planet is thought to be small and rocky, although composition is unknown. Since it orbits very close to its star, it is too hot to host life, due to it having a temperature of 450 K. It has a radius 95% that of Earth, very similar to Venus.

== Host star ==
K2-315
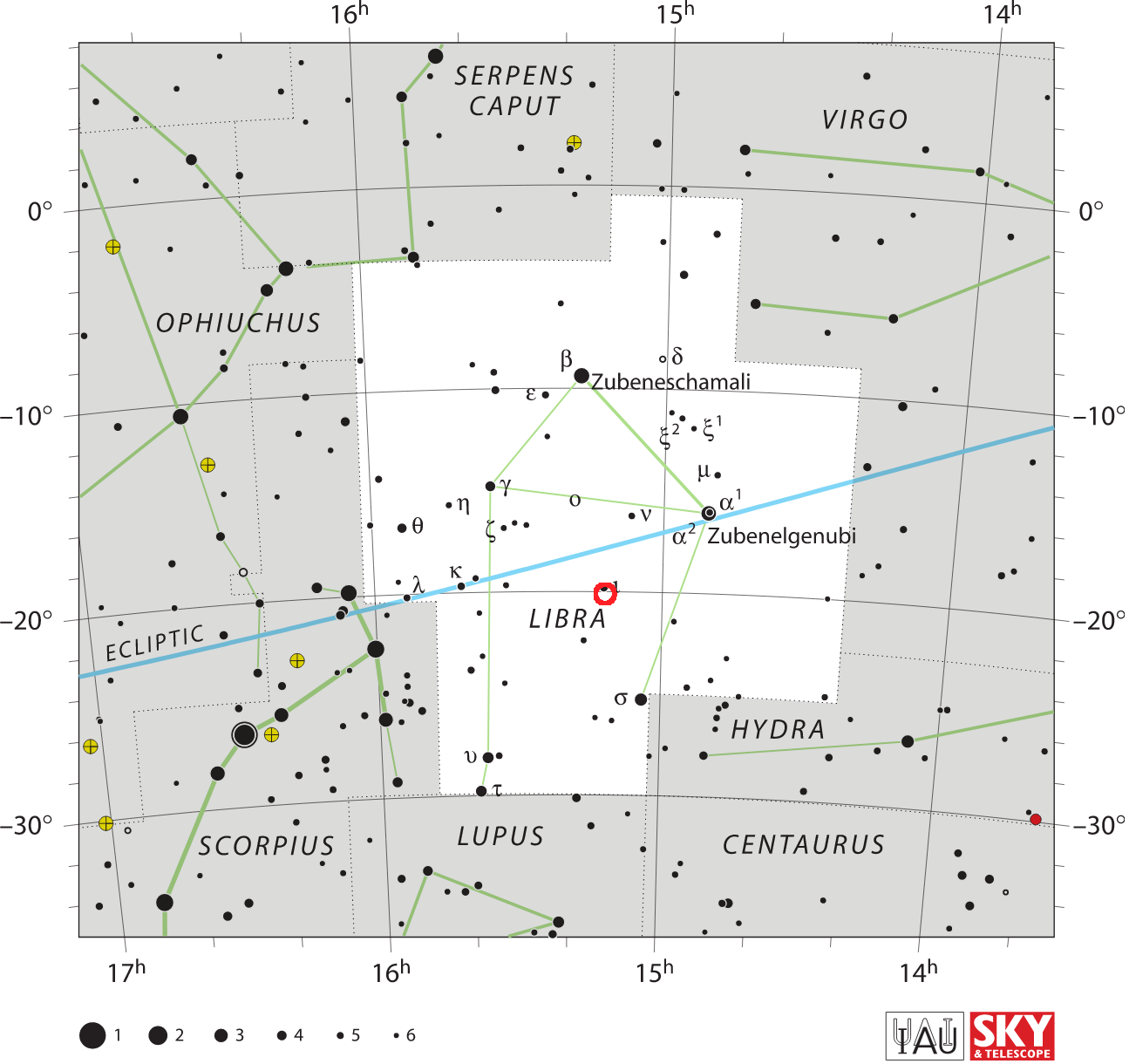
- The location of K2-315 (circled in red)

Observation data Epoch J2000.0 Equinox ICRS
- Constellation: Libra
- Right ascension: 15^{h} 12^{m} 05.1944^{s}
- Declination: −20° 06′ 30.5428″
- Apparent magnitude (V): 17.67

Characteristics
- Evolutionary stage: Red dwarf
- Spectral type: M3.5±0.5 V

Astrometry
Radial velocity (R_{v})	6.25±0.17 km/s
Proper motion (μ)	RA: −120.013 mas/yr Dec.: +74.471 mas/yr
Parallax (π)	17.6353±0.0492 mas
Distance	184.9 ± 0.5 ly (56.7 ± 0.2 pc)

Details
Mass	0.174±0.004 M_{☉}
Radius	0.2±0.01 R_{☉}
Luminosity	0.398% L_{☉}
Surface gravity (log g)	5.094±0.006 cgs
Temperature	3,300±30 K
Metallicity [Fe/H]	−0.24±0.09 dex
Rotational velocity (v sin i)	<5 km/s
Age	>1 Gyr

Other designations
- K2-315, EPIC 249631677

Database references
SIMBAD	data

K2-315 is a star in the southern zodiac constellation Libra. It has an apparent magnitude of 17.67, requiring a powerful telescope to be seen. The star is relatively close at a distance of 185 light-years but is receding with a radial velocity of 6.25 km/s.

K2-315 has a stellar classification of M3.5±0.5 V, indicating that it is a M-type main-sequence star (with 14% uncertainty). It has 17.4% the mass of the Sun and 20% its radius. Typical for red dwarfs, it has a luminosity less than 1% of the Sun, which yields an effective temperature of 3,300 K. Unlike most planetary hosts, K2-315 is metal-deficient, with an iron abundance only 57% that of the Sun. It is estimated to be over a billion years old, and has a projected rotational velocity less than 5 km/s.
