= 16 Librae =

Star in the constellation Libra

- Location of 16 Librae (circled in red)

Observation data Epoch J2000 Equinox ICRS
- Constellation: Libra
- Right ascension: 14^{h} 57^{m} 11.00009^{s}
- Declination: −04° 20′ 47.2547″
- Apparent magnitude (V): 4.49

Characteristics
- Spectral type: F2 V
- U−B color index: +0.05
- B−V color index: +0.32

Astrometry
Radial velocity (R_{v})	+26.3±0.6 km/s
Proper motion (μ)	RA: −96.98 mas/yr Dec.: −153.40 mas/yr
Parallax (π)	37.17±0.32 mas
Distance	87.7 ± 0.8 ly (26.9 ± 0.2 pc)
Absolute magnitude (M_{V})	2.32

Details

16 Lib A
Mass	1.47 M_{☉}
Luminosity	9.77 L_{☉}
Surface gravity (log g)	3.99 cgs
Temperature	7,187±244 K
Metallicity [Fe/H]	−0.13 dex
Rotational velocity (v sin i)	113.3 km/s
Age	660 Myr

Other designations
- 16 Lib, BD−03°3696, FK5 3177, GJ 9503, HD 132052, HIP 73165, HR 5570, SAO 140240, WDS J14572-0421A

Database references
SIMBAD	data

16 Librae is a star in the constellation Libra. It is a faint star but visible to the naked eye with an apparent visual magnitude of 4.49. An annual parallax shift of 37.17 mas yields a distance estimate of 87.7 light years. It is moving further from the Sun with a radial velocity of +26 km/s.

This is an ordinary F-type main-sequence star with a stellar classification of F2 V. It is an estimated 660 million years old and is spinning rapidly with a projected rotational velocity of 113 km/s. The star has 1.47 times the mass of the Sun and is radiating nearly 10 times the Sun's luminosity from its photosphere at an effective temperature of about 7,187 K.

16 Librae has a common proper motion companion located at an angular separation of 22.8 arc seconds along a position angle of 297°, as of 1999. Designated component B, this is a red dwarf star with a class of about M6 and an infrared J-band magnitude of 12.19.
