= 2MASS 1507−1627 =

Star in the constellation Libra

2MASS J15074769−1627386
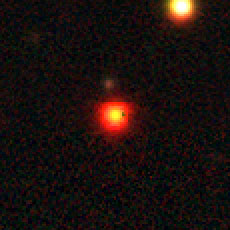
- 2MASS 1507−1627; Credit: legacy surveys

Observation data Epoch J2000 Equinox ICRS
- Constellation: Libra
- Right ascension: 15^{h} 07^{m} 47.69^{s}
- Declination: −16° 27′ 38.6″
- Apparent magnitude (V): 22.136

Characteristics
- Evolutionary stage: brown dwarf
- Spectral type: L5
- Apparent magnitude (R): 18.928±0.097
- Apparent magnitude (J): 12.830 ± 0.027
- Apparent magnitude (H): 11.895 ± 0.024
- Apparent magnitude (K): 11.312 ± 0.026

Astrometry
Radial velocity (R_{v})	-39.85 km/s
Proper motion (μ)	RA: -151.645 mas/yr Dec.: -895.714 mas/yr
Parallax (π)	134.9474±0.2611 mas
Distance	24.17 ± 0.05 ly (7.41 ± 0.01 pc)

Details
Radius	0.08 R_{☉}
Surface gravity (log g)	5.5 cgs
Temperature	1600 K

Other designations
- 2MASS J15074769-1627386, 2MASSW J1507476162738, 2MUCD 11296, 2MASSI J1507476−162738, Gaia DR2 6306068659857135232

Database references
SIMBAD	data

2MASS J15074769−1627386 (also abbreviated to 2MASS 1507−1627) is a brown dwarf in the constellation Libra, located about 23.9 light-years from Earth. It was discovered in 1999 by I. Neill Reid et al. It belongs to the spectral class L5; its surface temperature is 1,300 to 2,000 kelvins. As with other brown dwarfs of spectral type L, its spectrum is dominated by metal hydrides and alkali metals. Its spectrum also has a weak silicate absorption band and highly variable water absorption band, indicating complicated clouds and haze structures.

The brown dwarf is suspected to have a substellar companion (planet) on wide orbit with period over 10 years.
