= 37 Librae =

Star in the constellation Libra

- Location of 37 Librae (circled in red)

Observation data Epoch J2000.0 Equinox J2000.0
- Constellation: Libra
- Right ascension: 15^{h} 34^{m} 10.70209^{s}
- Declination: −10° 03′ 52.3063″
- Apparent magnitude (V): 4.61

Characteristics
- Evolutionary stage: subgiant
- Spectral type: K1III–IV
- B−V color index: 1.00±0.03

Astrometry
Radial velocity (R_{v})	+49.25±0.08 km/s
Proper motion (μ)	RA: +307.63 mas/yr Dec.: −234.51 mas/yr
Parallax (π)	34.57±0.22 mas
Distance	94.3 ± 0.6 ly (28.9 ± 0.2 pc)
Absolute magnitude (M_{V})	2.30

Details
Mass	1.38±0.10 M_{☉}
Radius	5.133±0.043 R_{☉}
Luminosity	12.71±0.69 L_{☉}
Surface gravity (log g)	3.19±0.06 cgs
Temperature	4,809±62 K
Metallicity [Fe/H]	0.02±0.04 dex
Rotational velocity (v sin i)	2.02±0.33 km/s
Age	3.39±0.80 Gyr

Other designations
- 37 Lib, BD−09°4171, FK5 1409, GC 20914, HD 138716, HIP 76219, HR 5777, SAO 140609

Database references
SIMBAD	data

37 Librae is a single star in the southern zodiac constellation of Libra. It is visible to the naked eye as a faint, orange-hued star with an apparent visual magnitude of 4.61. The star is located 94 light years from the Sun based on parallax, and is drifting further away with a radial velocity of +49 km/s.

This is an evolving subgiant star with a stellar classification of K1 III–IV, where the luminosity class indicates the spectrum displays blended traits of a subgiant and a giant star. It is an estimated 3.4 billion years old with 1.4 times the mass of the Sun. Having the supply of hydrogen at its core all but exhausted, the star is starting to expand; currently it has five times the girth of the Sun. It is radiating 12.7 times the Sun's luminosity from its enlarged photosphere at an effective temperature of 4,809 K. At this temperature, 37 Librae glows with the hue of a K-type star.
