= List of storms named Tembin =

The name Tembin (Japanese: テンビン, [tẽ̞mbʲĩn]) has been used for four tropical cyclones in the western North Pacific Ocean. The name was contributed by Japan and refers to the constellation Libra, the balancing scale, in Japanese.

- Tropical Storm Tembin (2000) (T0005, 09W) – not a threat to land while tropical.
- Tropical Storm Tembin (2005) (T0522, 23W, Ondoy) – crossed the Philippines.
- Typhoon Tembin (2012) (T1214, 15W, Igme) – made landfall in Taiwan twice; interacted with Typhoon Bolaven.
- Typhoon Tembin (2017) (T1727, 33W, Vinta) – a Category 2 typhoon that devastated southern Philippines, killing over 266 people.

The name Tembin was retired following the 2017 Pacific typhoon season and was replaced with Koinu (Japanese: コイヌ, [ko̞inɯ̟]), which refers to the constellation Canis Minor, the puppy, in Japanese.
