= CN star =

Unusually strong cyano radical bands in star

A CN star has unusually strong cyano radical bands in its spectrum compared to other stars of its stellar class. Cyano radical is a simple molecule of one carbon atom and one nitrogen atom, with absorption bands around wavelengths 388.9 and 421.6 nanometer. This group of stars was first noticed in certain G and K-type giants by J. J. Nassau and W. W. Morgan in 1949, then a further 4,150 were identified by Nancy G. Roman in 1952. They can be distinguished from barium stars by the lack of s-process elements, and from other types of luminous stars by the general weakness of features other than the CN lines.

The excess strength of the CN bands is classified by a positive index with increments of 0.5. A value of zero indicates a normal star and is not listed in the stellar class, while the peak value of 4 is essentially similar to a carbon star. Stars classified in the MK system with a CN suffix are considered "strong" CN stars. Hence, 42 Librae is a strong CN star with a class of K3-III CN2. A value of 0.5 is also termed a marginal CN star, which corresponds to the typical giant stars in the Hyades cluster.
