= Epsilon Librae =

Star in the constellation Libra

- Location of ε Librae (circled in red)

Observation data Epoch J2000 Equinox J2000
- Constellation: Libra
- Right ascension: 15^{h} 24^{m} 11.89101^{s}
- Declination: −10° 19′ 20.1740″
- Apparent magnitude (V): 4.922

Characteristics
- Spectral type: F3 V or F5 IV
- U−B color index: +0.080
- B−V color index: +0.451

Astrometry
Proper motion (μ)	RA: −66.52 mas/yr Dec.: −154.24 mas/yr
Parallax (π)	32.02±0.72 mas
Distance	102 ± 2 ly (31.2 ± 0.7 pc)
Absolute magnitude (M_{V})	2.37

Orbit
Period (P)	226.9437±0.0025 d
Semi-major axis (a)	0.85192±0.00359 au
Eccentricity (e)	0.6649±0.0014
Inclination (i)	52.6±9.4°
Periastron epoch (T)	2453593.022 ± 0.041 HJD
Argument of periastron (ω) (secondary)	339.84±0.15°

Details

ε Lib A
Mass	1.17±0.02 M_{☉}
Radius	2.159 R_{☉}
Luminosity	9.3 L_{☉}
Surface gravity (log g)	4.13 cgs
Temperature	6,552±80 K
Metallicity [Fe/H]	+0.09 dex
Rotational velocity (v sin i)	10 km/s
Age	1.5 Gyr

ε Lib B
Mass	0.410±0.004 M_{☉}

Other designations
- ε Lib, 31 Lib, BD−09°4138, HD 137052, HIP 75379, HR 5723, SAO 159234

Database references
SIMBAD	data

Epsilon Librae is a binary star system in the zodiac constellation Libra. Its name is a Bayer designation that is Latinized from ε Librae, and abbreviated Epsilon Lib or ε Lib. With an apparent visual magnitude of 4.922, it is bright enough to be seen with the naked eye. Based upon an annual parallax shift of 32.02 mas, it is located about 102 light years away from the Sun.

This is a single-lined spectroscopic binary star system. The pair orbit each other with a period of 226.9 days and an eccentricity of 0.66. The semimajor axis of their orbit is estimated to be 0.85 AU, or 85% of the distance from the Earth to the Sun. The primary, component A, has been catalogued with stellar classifications of F3 V and F5 IV, suggesting that it is an F-type star that either belongs to the main sequence or has evolved into a subgiant as the hydrogen at its core nears exhaustion.

The primary has 1.17 times the mass of the Sun and 2.16 times the Sun's radius. It is around 1.5 billion years old and is spinning with a projected rotational velocity of 10 km/s. The star radiates 9.3 times the solar luminosity from its outer atmosphere at an effective temperature of 6,552 K. The secondary, component B, has 41% of the Sun's mass.
