= Tau Librae =

Star in the constellation Libra

- Location of τ Librae (circled in red)

Observation data Epoch J2000.0 Equinox J2000.0 (ICRS)
- Constellation: Libra
- Right ascension: 15^{h} 38^{m} 39.36950^{s}
- Declination: −29° 46′ 39.8956″
- Apparent magnitude (V): 3.68

Characteristics
- Spectral type: B2.5 V + B9V + A1V-A2V
- U−B color index: −0.717
- B−V color index: −0.179

Astrometry
Radial velocity (R_{v})	+33.3±2.3 km/s
Proper motion (μ)	RA: −22.08 mas/yr Dec.: −24.46 mas/yr
Parallax (π)	8.89±0.20 mas
Distance	367 ± 8 ly (112 ± 3 pc)
Absolute magnitude (M_{V})	−1.59

Orbit
Period (P)	3.2907 d
Semi-major axis (a)	0.089 au
Eccentricity (e)	0.28
Inclination (i)	55°
Longitude of the node (Ω)	114°
Periastron epoch (T)	2439272.312 JD
Semi-amplitude (K_{1}) (primary)	75 km/s
Semi-amplitude (K_{2}) (secondary)	167 km/s

Details

τ Lib A
Mass	7.25±0.49 M_{☉}
Radius	3.2 R_{☉}
Luminosity (bolometric)	2,705 L_{☉}
Surface gravity (log g)	4.33 cgs
Temperature	17,990 K
Metallicity [Fe/H]	+0.17 dex
Rotational velocity (v sin i)	134 km/s
Age	31.5±5.6 Myr

τ Lib B
Mass	2.75 M_{☉}

τ Lib C
Mass	2.1 M_{☉}

Other designations
- τ Lib, 40 Lib, CD−29°11837, HD 139365, HIP 76600, HR 5812, SAO 183649

Database references
SIMBAD	data

Tau Librae, Latinized from τ Librae, is a triple or quadruple system at the southern edge of the zodiac constellation of Libra. It can be seen with the naked eye, having an apparent visual magnitude of 3.68. The distance to this system is around 367 light years, as determined from an annual parallax shift of 8.89 mas.

Judging by its motion through space and physical properties, this system is a member of the Upper Centaurus–Lupus group of the Scorpius–Centaurus association. It is a double-lined spectroscopic binary with an orbital period of just 3.3 days and an eccentricity of 0.28. The primary, component A, is a B-type main sequence star with a stellar classification of B2.5 V. It is estimated to hold more than seven times the mass of the Sun and have over three times the Sun's radius. It is only 31.5 million years old and is spinning relatively rapidly with a projected rotational velocity of 134 km/s. It is a heartbeat star system, with pulsations caused by tidal forces. The secondary, component B, is also a B-type main-sequence star, with a spectral type B9V and a mass 2.75 times that of the Sun.

The third component, Tau Librae C, is an A-type main-sequence star with an estimated spectral type of A1V-A2V and a mass of 2.1 solar masses. It was initially detected through its astrometric signature in the Hipparcos data, and was later directly detected. The observations suggest that its orbit is highly-eccentric and/or seen nearly edge-on. Its angular separation is 60.2 mas, implying a projected separation of 6.8 au and, if close to the orbital semi-major axis, an orbital period of 5.3 years.

There is also a wide common proper motion companion, named Gaia DR2 6209197287409304320, at 947″ (projected separation of 0.5 pc) with a temperature of 3,826 K.

The system is emitting an infrared excess, suggesting the presence of a circumstellar disk of material.
