= Kappa Librae =

Star in the constellation Libra

- Location of κ Librae (circled in red)

Observation data Epoch J2000 Equinox ICRS
- Constellation: Libra
- Right ascension: 15^{h} 41^{m} 56.79858^{s}
- Declination: −19° 40′ 43.7745″
- Apparent magnitude (V): 4.72

Characteristics
- Spectral type: K5 III
- U−B color index: +1.94
- B−V color index: +1.58

Astrometry
Radial velocity (R_{v})	−4.5±1.5 km/s
Proper motion (μ)	RA: −32.06 mas/yr Dec.: −103.15 mas/yr
Parallax (π)	10.57±1.40 mas
Distance	approx. 310 ly (approx. 90 pc)
Absolute magnitude (M_{V})	−0.62

Details
Mass	1.6 M_{☉}
Radius	38 R_{☉}
Luminosity	388 L_{☉}
Surface gravity (log g)	1.35 cgs
Temperature	3,875 K
Metallicity [Fe/H]	−0.39 dex

Other designations
- κ Lib, 43 Lib, BD−19°4188, FK5 1413, HD 139997, HIP 76880, HR 5838, SAO 159442

Database references
SIMBAD	data

Kappa Librae is a star system in the zodiac constellation of Libra. Its name is a Bayer designation that is Latinized from κ Librae, and abbreviated Kappa Lib or κ Lib. Its apparent visual magnitude is 4.72, so it can be seen with the naked eye. The annual parallax shift of 10.57 mas indicates it is roughly 310 light years away. It is positioned 0.02 degrees south of the ecliptic.

The star shows acceleration components in its proper motion, indicating with high probability that it is an astrometric binary. The visible component is an evolved K-type giant star with a stellar classification of K5 III. It is a suspected variable star with a brightness that ranges between 4.70 and 4.75. Kappa Librae is 38 times larger than the Sun, and is radating 388 times the solar luminosity from its outer atmosphere at an effective temperature of 3,875 K.

In Chinese astronomy, Kappa Librae is called 日, Pinyin: Rì, meaning Sun, because this star is marking itself and stand alone in Sun asterism, Room mansion (see: Chinese constellations).
