= Lambda Librae =

Binary star system in the constellation Libra

- Location of λ Librae (circled in red)

Observation data Epoch J2000.0 Equinox J2000.0 (ICRS)
- Constellation: Libra
- Right ascension: 15^{h} 53^{m} 20.05463^{s}
- Declination: −20° 10′ 01.4177″
- Apparent magnitude (V): 5.03

Characteristics
- Spectral type: B3 V
- U−B color index: −0.584
- B−V color index: −0.023
- Variable type: Rotating ellipsoidal

Astrometry
Radial velocity (R_{v})	−2.0±0.5 km/s
Proper motion (μ)	RA: −9.81 mas/yr Dec.: −26.85 mas/yr
Parallax (π)	10.54±0.91 mas
Distance	310 ± 30 ly (95 ± 8 pc)
Absolute magnitude (M_{V})	0.56

Orbit
Period (P)	14.4829±0.0004 d
Eccentricity (e)	0.27±0.09
Periastron epoch (T)	2435172.380 ± 0.664 JD
Argument of periastron (ω) (secondary)	217±17°
Semi-amplitude (K_{1}) (primary)	28.5±3.3 km/s

Details
Mass	5.01±0.26 M_{☉}
Radius	3.9 R_{☉}
Luminosity	743 L_{☉}
Surface gravity (log g)	4.75 cgs
Temperature	18,700 K
Metallicity [Fe/H]	−0.27 dex
Rotational velocity (v sin i)	155 km/s
Age	282 Myr

Other designations
- λ Lib, 45 Lib, BD−19°4249, FK5 1415, HD 142096, HIP 77811, HR 5902, SAO 183895.

Database references
SIMBAD	data

λ Librae (Latinised as Lambda Librae) is the Bayer designation for a binary star system in the zodiac constellation of Libra. It can be faintly seen with the naked eye, having an apparent visual magnitude of 5.03. With an annual parallax shift of 10.54 mas, it is roughly 310 light years from the Sun. At that distance, the visual magnitude of this system is diminished by an extinction factor of 0.22 due to interstellar dust. It is 0.1 degree north of the ecliptic.

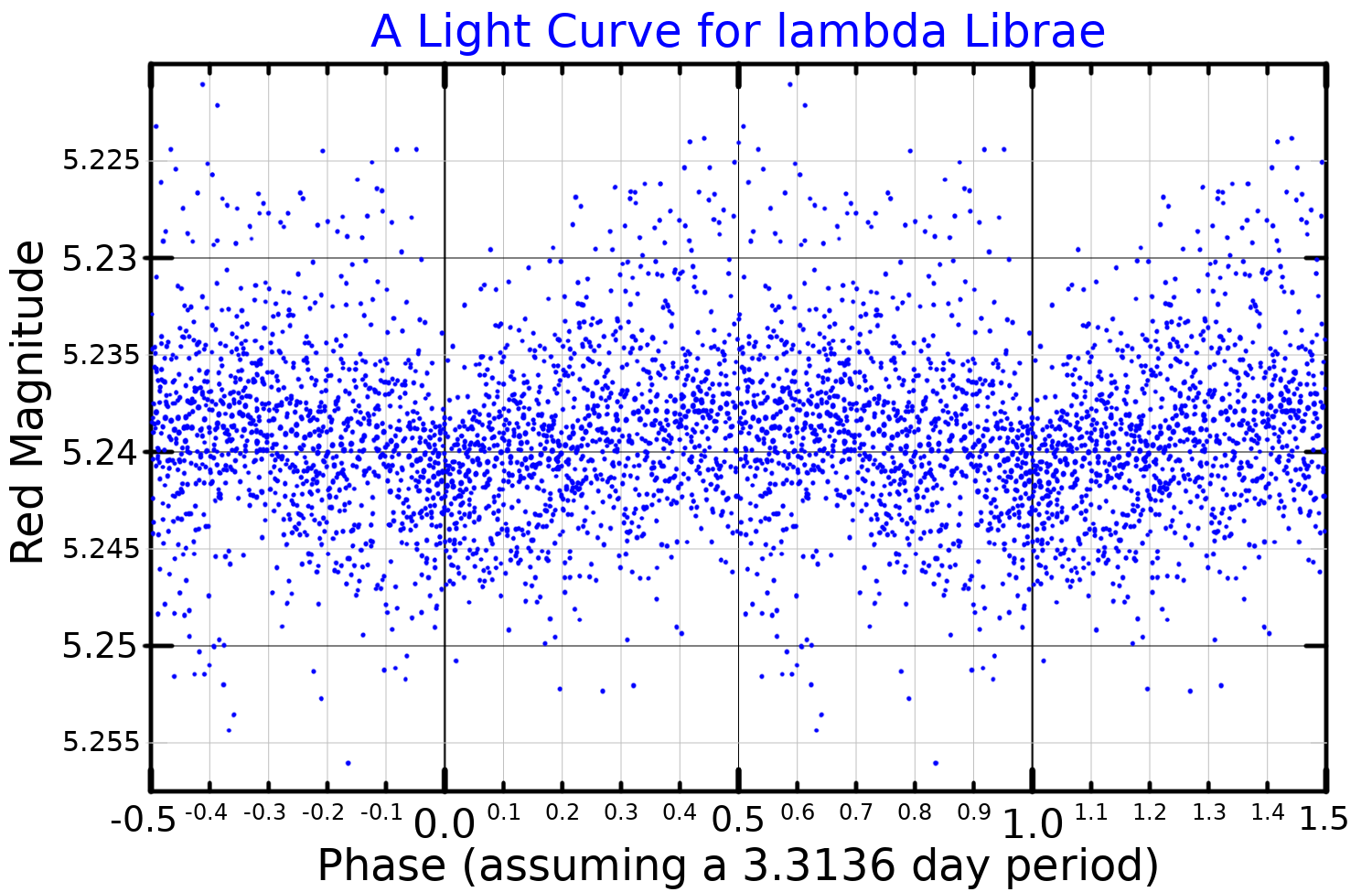
A light curve for Lambda Librae, adapted from Wraight et al. (2012)

This is a single-lined spectroscopic binary star system with an orbital period of 14.48 days and an eccentricity of 0.27. The visible component is a B-type main sequence star with a stellar classification of B3 V. It is a helium-weak chemically peculiar star and a rotating ellipsoidal variable. The star has an estimated 3.9 times the radius of the Sun and five times the Sun's mass. This is a candidate Vega-like star, meaning that it shows an infrared excess characteristic of a circumstellar debris disk. The system is a source of X-ray emission.
