= Beta Librae =

Star in the constellation Libra

- The position of β Librae (circled)

Observation data Epoch J2000 Equinox ICRS
- Constellation: Libra
- Right ascension: 15^{h} 17^{m} 00.41382^{s}
- Declination: −09° 22′ 58.4919″
- Apparent magnitude (V): 2.61

Characteristics
- Evolutionary stage: Main sequence
- Spectral type: B8 V
- U−B color index: −0.359
- B−V color index: −0.106
- Variable type: Suspected

Astrometry
Radial velocity (R_{v})	−35.2 km/s
Proper motion (μ)	RA: −98.10 mas/yr Dec.: −19.65 mas/yr
Parallax (π)	17.62±0.16 mas
Distance	185 ± 2 ly (56.8 ± 0.5 pc)
Absolute magnitude (M_{V})	−1.16

Details
Mass	3.5+0.3 −0.2 M_{☉}
Radius	4.77 R_{☉}
Luminosity	413 L_{☉}
Temperature	11,900 K
Metallicity [Fe/H]	0.33 dex
Rotational velocity (v sin i)	250 km/s
Age	80+50 −40 Myr

Other designations
- Zubeneschamali, Kiffa Australis, Lanx Borealis, β Lib, 27 Librae, BD−08°3935, FK5 564, HD 135742, HIP 74785, HR 5685, NSV 7009, SAO 140430

Database references
SIMBAD	data

Beta Librae is the brightest star in the zodiac constellation of Libra. It has the proper name Zubeneschamali /zuːˌbɛnɛʃəˈmeɪli/, Beta Librae is its Bayer designation. From parallax measurements taken by the Hipparcos mission, its distance is measured to be 185 light-years (57 parsecs).

The apparent visual magnitude of this star is 2.6. According to Eratosthenes, Beta Librae was observed to be brighter than Antares. Ptolemy, 350 years later, said it was as bright as Antares. The discrepancy may be due to Antares becoming brighter, but this is not known for certain. It could simply be caused by Beta Librae being a variable star, showing a present-day variability of 0.03 of a magnitude.

== Name ==
β Librae (Latinised to Beta Librae) is the star's Bayer designation. It can also be abbreviated as Beta Lib or β Lib.

It bore the traditional name Zubeneschamali /ˌzuːbənˌɛʃəˈmeɪli/ (less common renderings, or corruptions, are Zuben Eschamali, Zuben el Chamali, Zubenesch, Zubenelg), derived from the Arabic الزُّبَانَى الشَمَالِي (al-zubānā al-šamāliyy) meaning "the northern claw". This name originated in a time when Libra was viewed as representing the "claws of the scorpion". There was also Kiffa Borealis, from the Arabic al-kiffah aš-šamāliyy "the northern pan (of the scales)" and the Latin equivalent Lanx Borealis. In 2016, the International Astronomical Union organized a Working Group on Star Names (WGSN) to catalogue and standardize proper names for stars. The WGSN approved the name Zubeneschamali for this star on 21 August 2016 and it is now so entered in the IAU Catalog of Star Names.

In Chinese, 氐宿 (Dī Xiù), meaning Root, refers to an asterism consisting of β Librae, α^{2} Librae, ι Librae and γ Librae. Consequently, the Chinese name for β Librae itself is 氐宿四 (Dī Xiù sì), "the Fourth Star of Root".

== Properties ==
Based upon the features of its spectrum, Beta Librae has a stellar classification of B8 V, making it a B-type main-sequence star. It is 4.77 times larger than the Sun, about 410 times more luminous, and has a surface effective temperature of 11,900 K, double that of the Sun. This high temperature produces light with a simple spectrum, making it ideal for examining the interstellar gas and dust between Earth and the star. Like many stars of its kind, it is spinning rapidly, over 100 times faster than the Sun with a projected rotational velocity of 250 km·s^{−1}.

This type of massive, hydrogen-fusing star often appears blue-white, and is usually stated to be white or bluish by modern observers, but earlier observers often described Beta Librae as the only greenish star visible to the naked eye. There seems to be no generally accepted explanation for why some observers see it as green. The small periodic variations in the magnitude of Beta Librae suggest the presence of a companion star which is not directly observable from Earth. However, it is categorized as a single star.

In around 200 million years, Beta Librae will have exhausted the supply of hydrogen in its core and become a giant star similar to Beta Herculis, which had a similar initial mass.

== See also ==
- List of stars in Libra
- Alpha Librae (Zubenelgenubi)
