= 42 Librae =

Star in the constellation Libra

Observation data Epoch J2000.0 Equinox ICRS
- Constellation: Libra
- Right ascension: 15^{h} 34^{m} 16.89835^{s}
- Declination: −10° 03′ 05.07536″
- Apparent magnitude (V): 4.97

Characteristics
- Spectral type: K3-III CN2
- B−V color index: 1.302±0.056

Astrometry
Radial velocity (R_{v})	−21.8±2.8 km/s
Proper motion (μ)	RA: −16.872 mas/yr Dec.: −17.820 mas/yr
Parallax (π)	8.7152±0.2628 mas
Distance	370 ± 10 ly (115 ± 3 pc)
Absolute magnitude (M_{V})	−0.37

Details
Radius	25.9±0.4 R_{☉}
Luminosity	213.6±7.3 L_{☉}
Surface gravity (log g)	2.30 cgs
Temperature	4,332±34 K
Metallicity [Fe/H]	−0.03±0.06 dex

Other designations
- 42 Lib, CD−23°12458, FK5 3239, GJ 9526, HD 139663, HIP 76742, HR 5824, SAO 183686

Database references
SIMBAD	data

42 Librae is a single star located around 370 light years distant from the Sun in the southern zodiac constellation of Libra. It is visible to the naked eye as a faint, orange-hued star with an apparent visual magnitude of 4.97. This object is drifting closer to the Earth with a heliocentric radial velocity of −22 km/s.

The Bayer designation Chi Librae has been associated with this star, despite Johann Bayer not marking it as such in his Uranometria. Bode assigned the designation χ Librae to this star in his Uranographia. The designation is no longer in use.

This is an aging giant star with a stellar classification of K3-III CN2, where the suffix notation indicates this is a strong CN star with a high overabundance of cyanogen in its spectrum. Having exhausted the supply of hydrogen at its core, this star has expanded to 26 times the Sun's radius. Within the margin of error it has near-solar abundances of iron, suggesting a Sun–like metallicity. The star is radiating 214 times the luminosity of the Sun from its swollen photosphere at an effective temperature of 4,332 K.
