= Delta Librae =

Binary star in the constellation Libra

δ Librae
- Location of δ Librae (circled in red)

Observation data Epoch J2000 Equinox J2000
- Constellation: Libra
- Right ascension: 15^{h} 00^{m} 58.34830^{s}
- Declination: −08° 31′ 08.2104″
- Apparent magnitude (V): 4.93

Characteristics
- Evolutionary stage: main sequence
- Spectral type: B9.5V
- U−B color index: −0.10
- B−V color index: +0.00
- Variable type: Algol eclipsing

Astrometry
Radial velocity (R_{v})	−38.7±2 km/s
Proper motion (μ)	RA: −63.051 mas/yr Dec.: −6.024 mas/yr
Parallax (π)	9.2824±0.4725 mas
Distance	350 ± 20 ly (108 ± 5 pc)
Absolute magnitude (M_{V})	+0.15

Orbit
Period (P)	2.3273543 days
Semi-major axis (a)	12.73±0.34 mas
Eccentricity (e)	0.07
Semi-amplitude (K_{1}) (primary)	76.6 km/s
Semi-amplitude (K_{2}) (secondary)	218.7 km/s

Details

δ Lib A
Mass	3.78±0.13 M_{☉}
Radius	3.60±0.13 R_{☉}
Luminosity	155+11 −10 L_{☉}
Temperature	10,520±110 K
Age	0.5 Gyr

δ Lib B
Mass	1.50±0.04 M_{☉}
Radius	3.79±0.04 R_{☉}
Luminosity	9.1+1.4 −1.2 L_{☉}
Temperature	5,150±175 K

Other designations
- δ Lib, Zuben Elakribi, 19 Librae, BD−07°3938, HD 132742, HIP 73473, HR 5586, SAO 140270

Database references
SIMBAD	data

Delta Librae, Latinized from δ Librae, is a variable star in the constellation Libra. It has the traditional name Zuben Elakribi, a variant of the traditional name of Gamma Librae. With μ Virginis it forms one of the Akkadian lunar mansions Mulu-izi (meaning "Man-of-fire").

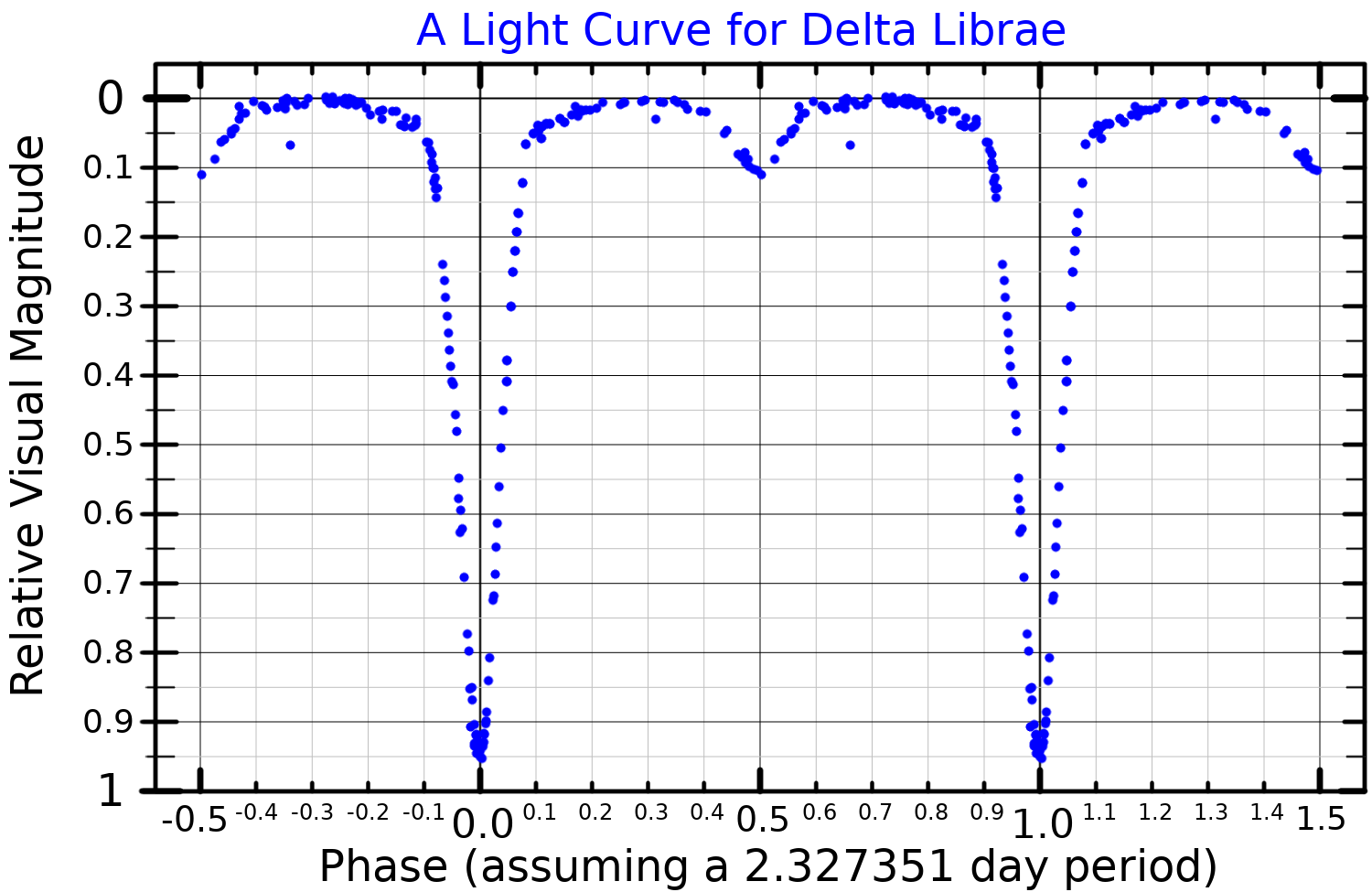
A light curve for Delta Librae, adapted from Shobbrook (2005)

δ Librae is approximately 350 light years from the Earth and the primary, component A, belongs to the spectral class B9.5V, indicating it is a B-type main-sequence star. It is visible to the naked eye with an apparent visual magnitude of 4.93 and is moving closer to the Sun with a radial velocity of −39 km/s. This is an Algol-like eclipsing binary star system, with a period of 2.3274 days and an eccentricity of 0.07. Its apparent magnitude varies from 4.91 to 5.90. The secondary is filling its Roche lobe and there is evidence of large-scale mass transfer in the past, with the secondary being more evolved than the primary despite now being less massive.

Along with λ Tauri, it was one of the first stars on which rotational line broadening was observed, by Frank Schlesinger in 1911.
