= Theta Librae =

Star in the constellation Libra

θ Librae
- Location of θ Librae (circled)

Observation data Epoch J2000 Equinox J2000
- Constellation: Libra
- Right ascension: 15^{h} 53^{m} 49.53806^{s}
- Declination: −16° 43′ 45.4582″
- Apparent magnitude (V): 4.136

Characteristics
- Evolutionary stage: red clump
- Spectral type: G9IIIb
- U−B color index: +0.82
- B−V color index: +1.01

Astrometry
Radial velocity (R_{v})	4.56±0.25 km/s
Proper motion (μ)	RA: +100.33 mas/yr Dec.: +135.02 mas/yr
Parallax (π)	19.36±0.15 mas
Distance	168 ± 1 ly (51.7 ± 0.4 pc)
Absolute magnitude (M_{V})	0.665

Details
Mass	1.47 M_{☉}
Radius	12.27 R_{☉}
Luminosity	68.1 L_{☉}
Surface gravity (log g)	2.44 cgs
Temperature	4,739 K
Metallicity [Fe/H]	−0.35 dex
Rotational velocity (v sin i)	0.0 km/s
Age	3.4 Gyr

Other designations
- θ Lib, 46 Librae, BD−16°4174, HD 142198, HIP 77853, HR 5908, SAO 159563

Database references
SIMBAD	data

Theta Librae is a single star in the southern zodiac constellation of Libra, near the constellation border with Scorpius. Its name is a Bayer designation that is Latinized from θ Librae, and abbreviated Theta Lib or θ Lib. It is visible to the naked eye as a faint, orange-hued star with an apparent visual magnitude of 4.14. The distance to this star is approximately 168 light years, as determined by parallax, and it is drifting further away with a radial velocity of 5 km/s. The position of this star near the ecliptic means it is subject to lunar occultations.

This object is an aging giant star with a stellar classification of G9IIIb. Having exhausted the supply of hydrogen at its core, it has cooled and expanded; at present it has 12.3 times the girth of the Sun. The star has an estimated mass about 47% greater than the Sun. It is radiating about 68 times the luminosity of the Sun from its photosphere at an effective temperature of about 4,739 K. It is probably on the red giant branch, which indicates it is generating energy through hydrogen fusion in a shell outside an inert helium core. However, there is a 41% chance that it is a red clump giant on the horizontal branch, which would mean it was somewhat older and less massive. It has sometimes been classified spectroscopically as a subgiant, but detailed study shows that it is too cool and luminous to be on the subgiant branch.
