= Sigma Librae =

Star in the constellation Libra

σ Librae
- Location of σ Librae (circled)

Observation data Epoch J2000.0 Equinox J2000.0 (ICRS)
- Constellation: Libra
- Right ascension: 15^{h} 04^{m} 04.21480^{s}
- Declination: −25° 16′ 55.0905″
- Apparent magnitude (V): 3.20 - 3.46

Characteristics
- Evolutionary stage: Asymptotic giant branch
- Spectral type: M2.5III
- U−B color index: +1.94
- B−V color index: +1.70
- Variable type: SRb

Astrometry
Radial velocity (R_{v})	−4.2 km/s
Proper motion (μ)	RA: −73.484 mas/yr Dec.: −42.632 mas/yr
Parallax (π)	12.539±0.3 mas
Distance	261.0+5.25 −6.26 ly (80.02+1.61 −1.92 pc)
Absolute magnitude (M_{V})	−1.5

Details
Mass	1.9±0.2 M_{☉}
Radius	108±3 R_{☉}
Luminosity	1,800 (Note: Luminosity calculated from Sigma Librae's absolute bolometric magnitude, with respect to the Sun's absolute bolometric magnitude of 4.74: 10^{0.4 • (4.74−(−3.4))} ≈ 1,800 L_{☉}.) L_{☉}
Surface gravity (log g)	0.9±0.3 cgs
Temperature	3,596 K
Metallicity [Fe/H]	0.00 dex

Other designations
- Brachium, 20 Librae, CD−24°11834, FK5 556, HD 133216, HIP 73714, HR 5603, SAO 183139, WDS 15041-2517

Database references
SIMBAD	data

Sigma Librae is a star in the constellation of Libra. It has the proper name Brachium, Sigma Librae is its Bayer designation. The apparent visual magnitude is +3.29, making it visible to the naked eye. Based upon parallax measurements, this star is at a distance of roughly 260 light-years (80 parsecs) from the Sun, with a 2% margin of error. At that distance, the visual magnitude is diminished by 0.20±0.17 from extinction caused by intervening gas and dust.

== Nomenclature ==
σ Librae (Latinised to Sigma Librae) is the star's current Bayer designation. It can be abbreviated as Sigma Lib or σ Lib. The star originally bore the designation Gamma Scorpii and did not receive its current designation until the new designation was agreed upon by Commission 3 of the International Astronomical Union (IAU) on July 31, 1930.

It bore the traditional Latin names Brachium (arm) and Cornu (horn), and the non-unique minor Arabic names Zuben el Genubi (southern claw) (shared with Alpha Librae); Zuben Hakrabi (shared with Gamma Librae and Eta Librae, also rendered as Zuban Alakrab), and Ankaa (shared with Alpha Phoenicis). In 2016, the IAU organized a Working Group on Star Names (WGSN) to catalog and standardize proper names for stars. It approved the name Brachium on 5 September 2017. Ankaa had previously been approved as the name for Alpha Phoenicis on 29 July 2016. Both are now so included in the List of IAU-approved Star Names.

In Chinese, 折威 (Shé Wēi), meaning Executions (asterism), refers to an asterism consisting of σ Librae, 50 Hydrae, 3 Librae, 4 Librae and 12 Librae. Consequently, the Chinese name for σ Librae is 折威七 (Shé Wēi qī, English: the Seventh Star of Executions).

Sigma Librae was the brightest star in the obsolete constellation Turdus Solitarius, and was designated γ Turdii Solitarii by Le Monnier due to its former alias of γ Sco.

== Properties ==
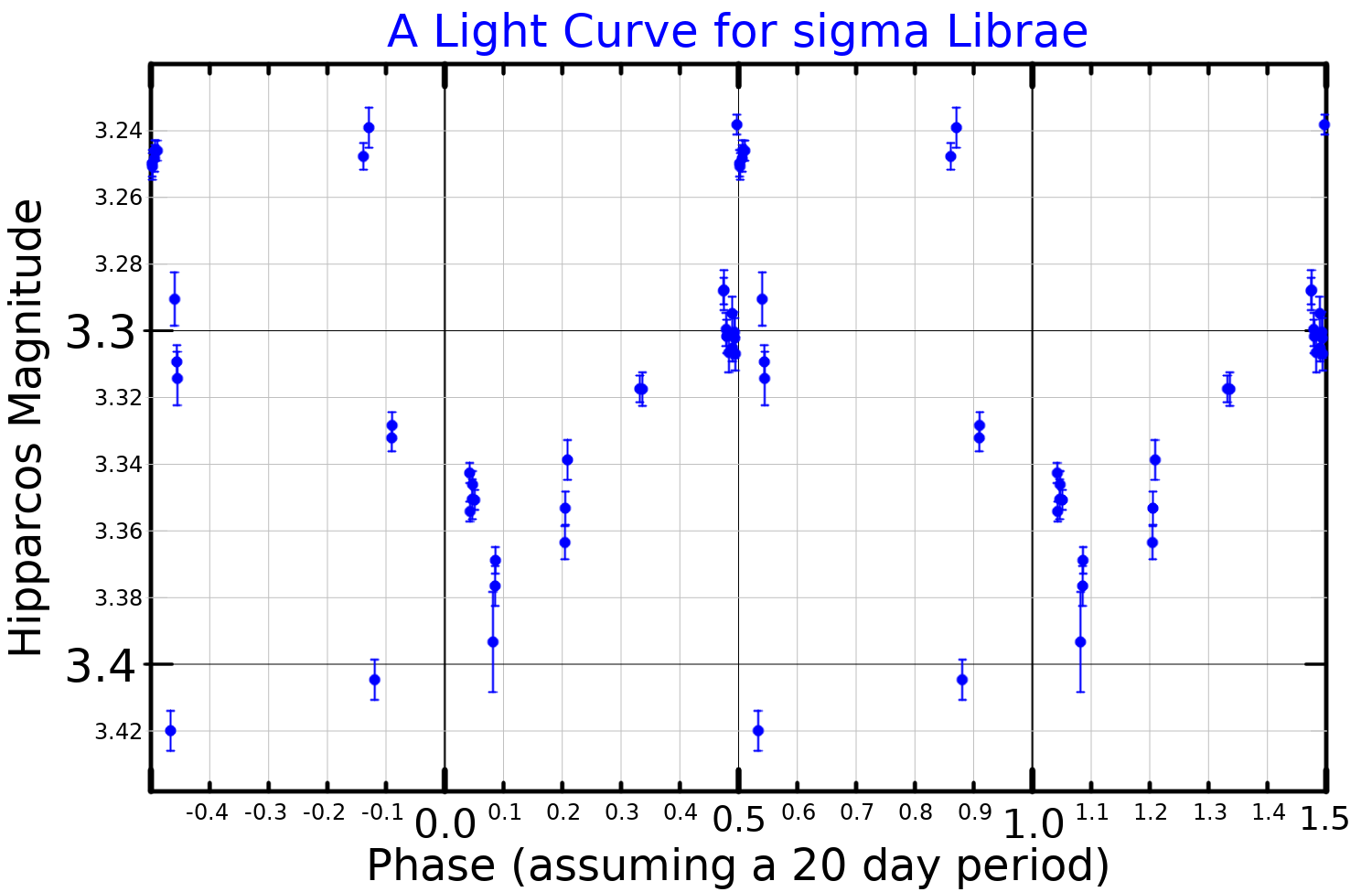
A light curve for Sigma Librae, plotted from Hipparcos data

The spectrum of this star matches a spectral class of M2.5 III, which places it in the red giant stage of its evolution. This is a semiregular variable star with a single pulsation period of 20 days. It shows small amplitude variations in magnitude of 0.10–0.15 on time scales as brief as 15–20 minutes, with cycles of repetition over intervals of 2.5–3.0 hours. This form of variability indicates that the star is on the asymptotic giant branch and is generating energy through the nuclear fusion of hydrogen and helium within concentric shells surrounding an inert core of carbon and oxygen.

Sigma Librae has a companion, Sigma Librae B, a 16th magnitude star separated by 102.8". It has similar proper motions with the primary and thus may form a binary star system, but this has not been confirmed yet. If a binary system, the physical separation is at least 102,800 au (1.626 ly; 0.498 pc). σ Lib B has around 20% the mass of the Sun.
