= 11 Librae =

Star in the constellation Libra

Observation data Epoch J2000 Equinox ICRS
- Constellation: Libra
- Right ascension: 14^{h} 51^{m} 01.07273^{s}
- Declination: −02° 17′ 56.9488″
- Apparent magnitude (V): 4.93

Characteristics
- Evolutionary stage: red clump
- Spectral type: K0 III-IV
- B−V color index: 0.988±0.001

Astrometry
Radial velocity (R_{v})	+83.60±0.06 km/s
Proper motion (μ)	RA: +89.97 mas/yr Dec.: −124.57 mas/yr
Parallax (π)	14.92±0.40 mas
Distance	219 ± 6 ly (67 ± 2 pc)
Absolute magnitude (M_{V})	0.80

Details
Mass	1.10±0.22 M_{☉}
Radius	10.32±0.60 R_{☉}
Luminosity	59+15 −12 L_{☉}
Surface gravity (log g)	2.42±0.09 cgs
Temperature	4,749±54 K
Metallicity [Fe/H]	−0.32±0.09 dex
Rotational velocity (v sin i)	3.74±0.48 km/s
Age	5.05±2.67 Myr

Other designations
- 11 Lib, BD−01°2991, HD 130952, HIP 72631, HR 5535, SAO 140176

Database references
SIMBAD	data

11 Librae is a single, fifth-magnitude star in the southern zodiac constellation of Libra. It is faintly visible to the naked eye with an apparent visual magnitude is 4.93. The star is moving further from the Sun with a heliocentric radial velocity of +83.6 km/s. The distance to this star, as estimated from its annual parallax shift of 14.92±0.40 mas, is about 219 light years.

This star has a stellar classification of K0 III/IV, indicating the spectrum displays mixed traits of a giant/subgiant K-type star. Alves (2000) and Afşar et al. (2012) classify it as a red clump star, which means it is an evolved star at the cool end of the horizontal branch and is generating energy through helium fusion in its core region. It is about five billion years old and is spinning with a projected rotational velocity of 4 km/s. The star has 1.1 times the mass of the Sun and has expanded to over 10 times the Sun's radius. It is radiating around 59 times the Sun's radius from its enlarged photosphere at an effective temperature of about 4,749 K.
