= Mu Librae =

Star in the constellation Libra

- Location of μ Librae (circled in red)

Observation data Epoch J2000.0 Equinox J2000.0 (ICRS)
- Constellation: Libra
- Right ascension: 14^{h} 49^{m} 19.05130^{s}
- Declination: −14° 08′ 56.4766″
- Apparent magnitude (V): 5.32 (5.69 + 6.72 + 14.70)

Characteristics
- Spectral type: A1pSrCrEu + A6m
- B−V color index: +0.07

Astrometry
Radial velocity (R_{v})	−3.2±1.4 km/s
Proper motion (μ)	RA: −65.95 mas/yr Dec.: −14.54 mas/yr
Parallax (π)	13.71±0.69 mas
Distance	240 ± 10 ly (73 ± 4 pc)
Absolute magnitude (M_{V})	1.32±0.20

Details

μ Lib A
Mass	2.31±0.12 M_{☉}
Radius	2.59 R_{☉}
Luminosity	41.7 L_{☉}
Temperature	9,592±260 K
Rotational velocity (v sin i)	29.0±1.7 km/s
Age	417 Myr

μ Lib B
Radius	2.59 R_{☉}
Rotational velocity (v sin i)	32.0±6 km/s

Other designations
- μ Lib, BD−13°3986, HD 130559, HIP 72489, HR 5523, SAO 158821

Database references
SIMBAD	data

μ Librae (Latinised as Mu Librae) is a probable triple star system in the zodiac constellation of Libra. They have a combined apparent visual magnitude of 5.32, which is bright enough to be faintly visible to the naked eye. With an annual parallax shift of 13.71 mas, the system is located at an estimated distance of around 240 light years.

The inner pair consists of two A-type stars that, as of 2006, had an angular separation of 1.79 arc seconds along a position angle of 5.5°. They have an estimated physical separation of 139 AU. The primary, component A, is a visual magnitude 5.69 magnetic Ap star showing overabundances of the elements aluminum, strontium, chromium, and europium. Hence, it has a stellar classification of A1pSrEuCr. It is a photometric variable with periods of 25.3992±0.1970 d and 1.8871±0.0008 d. The surface magnetic field strength is 1,375 Gauss.

The secondary, component B, is an Am star with a stellar classification of A6m. It has a visual magnitude of 6.72. The tertiary member, component C, is a magnitude 14.70 star at an angular separation of 12.90 arc seconds along a position angle of 294°, as of 2000.
