= Alpha Librae =

Quadruple star in the constellation Libra

α Librae
- Location of α Librae (circled)

Observation data Epoch J2000.0 Equinox ICRS
- Constellation: Libra
- α^{1} Lib (α Lib B)
- Right ascension: 14^{h} 50^{m} 41.18097^{s}
- Declination: −15° 59′ 50.0482″
- Apparent magnitude (V): +5.153
- α^{2} Lib (α Lib A)
- Right ascension: 14^{h} 50^{m} 52.71309^{s}
- Declination: −16° 02′ 30.3955″
- Apparent magnitude (V): +2.741

Characteristics

α^{1} Lib
- Spectral type: F3 V + M0–1 V
- U−B color index: −0.02
- B−V color index: +0.39

α^{2} Lib
- Evolutionary stage: Main sequence or blue straggler (α^{2} A)
- Spectral type: kA2hA5mA4 IV-V
- U−B color index: +0.10
- B−V color index: +0.15

Astrometry

α^{1} Lib
Radial velocity (R_{v})	−23.8±0.3 km/s
Proper motion (μ)	RA: −136.27 mas/yr Dec.: −59.04 mas/yr
Parallax (π)	43.52±0.43 mas
Distance	74.9 ± 0.7 ly (23.0 ± 0.2 pc)
Absolute magnitude (M_{V})	+3.35

α^{2} Lib
Proper motion (μ)	RA: −105.68 mas/yr Dec.: −68.40 mas/yr
Parallax (π)	43.03±0.19 mas
Distance	75.8 ± 0.3 ly (23.2 ± 0.1 pc)
Absolute magnitude (M_{V})	+0.88

Orbit
Primary	α^{1} Lib A
Secondary	α^{1} Lib B
Period (P)	16.229±0.043 yr
Semi-major axis (a)	0.346±0.006″
Eccentricity (e)	0.244±0.008
Inclination (i)	54.4±1.5°
Longitude of the node (Ω)	122.7±1.4°
Periastron epoch (T)	2021.95±0.12
Argument of periastron (ω) (secondary)	184.1±3.3°
Semi-amplitude (K_{1}) (primary)	3.83±0.12 km/s

Orbit
Primary	α^{2} Lib A
Secondary	α^{2} Lib B
Period (P)	70.34±0.07 days
Semi-major axis (a)	0.52 au
Eccentricity (e)	0.41±0.02
Inclination (i)	71±3°
Longitude of the node (Ω)	333±17°
Periastron epoch (T)	JD 2455294.3±0.5
Argument of periastron (ω) (secondary)	48±7°
Semi-amplitude (K_{2}) (secondary)	43.1±0.5 km/s

Details

α^{2} Lib A
Mass	1.95 M_{☉}
Radius	2.21 R_{☉}
Surface gravity (log g)	3.91 cgs
Temperature	8,200 K
Age	700 Myr

α^{2} Lib B
Mass	1.79 M_{☉}
Radius	1.92 R_{☉}
Temperature	7,930 K
Age	700 Myr

α^{1} Lib A
Mass	1.36±0.02 M_{☉}
Radius	1.50 R_{☉}
Luminosity	3.83 L_{☉}
Surface gravity (log g)	4.23 cgs
Temperature	6,707±56 K
Metallicity [Fe/H]	−0.03 dex
Rotational velocity (v sin i)	5.95 km/s
Age	1.01±0.24 Gyr

α^{1} Lib B
Mass	0.5–0.6 M_{☉}

Other designations
- Zubenelgenubi, Kiffa Australis, Lanx Australis, α Lib, WDS J14509-1603
- α Lib B: α^{1} Lib, 8 Librae, BD−15°3965, FK5 1387, HD 130819, HIP 72603, HR 5530, SAO 158836
- α Lib A: α^{2} Lib, 9 Librae, BD−15°3966, FK5 548, HD 130841, HIP 72622, HR 5531, SAO 158840

Database references
SIMBAD	α^{1} Lib
- α^{2} Lib

Alpha Librae (α Librae, abbreviated Alpha Lib, α Lib) is a quadruple star system and, despite its 'alpha' designation, it is the second-brightest star in the constellation of Libra. The two components are designated α^{1} Librae and α^{2} Librae. The system bore the traditional name of Zubenelgenubi /zuːˌbɛnɛldʒɪˈnuːbi/, though the International Astronomical Union now regards that name as only applying to α^{2} Librae.

Alpha^{2} Librae is 0.33 degrees north of the ecliptic so it can be occulted by the Moon and (very rarely) by planets. It was occulted by Venus on October 25, 1947; the next occultation by a planet will be by Mercury on 10 November 2052. Both components are eclipsed (occulted) by the sun from about 7–9 November. Thus the star can be viewed the whole night, crossing the sky, in early May.

== Nomenclature ==
α Librae (Latinised to Alpha Librae) is the system's Bayer designation.

Zubenelgenubi /ˌzuːbənɛldʒəˈnuːbi/, also rendered Zuben Elgenubi, derives from the Arabic ّالزُبَانَى الجَنُوبِي al-zubānā al-janūbiyy "the southern claw", which was coined before Libra was recognized as a constellation distinct from Scorpius. The alternative name Kiffa Australis (Elkhiffa Australis) is a partial Latin translation of the Arabic al-kiffah al-janubiyyah الكفة الجنوبية "southern pan [of the scales]". Another name used in older astronomy texts, equivalent to "southern pan", was Lanx Australis.

In 2016, the International Astronomical Union organized a Working Group on Star Names (WGSN) to catalogue and standardize proper names for stars. The WGSN approved the name Zubenelgenubi for α^{2} Librae on 21 August 2016 and it is now so entered in the IAU Catalog of Star Names.

In Chinese, 氐宿 (Dī Xiù), meaning Root, refers to an asterism consisting of α^{2} Librae, ι Librae, γ Librae and β Librae. Consequently, the Chinese name for α^{2} Librae itself is 氐宿一 (Dī Xiù yī), "the First Star of Root".

== Properties ==
Aa
α^{2} Lib (70.3 days)
Ab
231″ separation
Ba
α^{1} Lib (16.3 years)
Bb

Hierarchy of orbits in the α Librae system

Alpha Librae is about 77 light-years (24 parsecs) from the Sun. The two brightest components of Alpha Librae form a double star moving together through space as common proper motion companions. They are separated in the sky by an angular distance of 231" (3'51"). The position angle of the companion is 314 degrees. The brighter of the two is a white star of spectral type A3, with an apparent magnitude of 2.8. Its companion is a type F4 star of apparent brightness 5.2. They are probably members of the Castor Moving Group of stars that have a similar motion through space and share a common origin some 200 million years ago.

=== Alpha^{2} Librae ===
The brightest member, α^{2} Librae or α Librae A, is itself a spectroscopic binary system. The components have similar masses (mass ratio of 0.92) but the primary has a rotational velocity three times higher than its companion, which could be caused by them having significantly misaligned spin axes or if the primary is a merger product.

=== Alpha^{1} Librae ===
The second member, α^{1} Librae or α Librae B, is separated from the primary system by around 5,360 AU. It too is a spectroscopic binary with an orbital period of 5,870 days and an angular separation of 0.383 arcseconds; equal to about 9 au.

=== KU Librae ===
The system may have a fifth component, the star KU Librae at a separation of 2.6°, thus forming a hierarchical quintuple star system. KU Lib shares a similar motion through space to the Alpha Librae system, but is separated from the other stars by about a parsec. It is sufficiently close to be gravitationally bound to the other members, but has a substantially different metallicity, making it unlikely to be physically bound to the system.

== See also ==
- List of stars in Libra
