= Upsilon Librae =

Binary star in the constellation Libra

- Location of υ Librae (circled in red)

Observation data Epoch J2000.0 Equinox J2000.0 (ICRS)
- Constellation: Libra
- Right ascension: 15^{h} 37^{m} 01.45020^{s}
- Declination: −28° 08′ 06.2926″
- Apparent magnitude (V): 3.628

Characteristics
- Spectral type: K3 III
- U−B color index: +1.586
- B−V color index: +1.374

Astrometry
Radial velocity (R_{v})	−24.9±0.7 km/s
Proper motion (μ)	RA: −12.82 mas/yr Dec.: −4.15 mas/yr
Parallax (π)	14.58±0.19 mas
Distance	224 ± 3 ly (68.6 ± 0.9 pc)
Absolute magnitude (M_{V})	−0.28

Details
Mass	1.67 M_{☉}
Radius	31.5 R_{☉}
Luminosity	309 L_{☉}
Surface gravity (log g)	1.58 cgs
Temperature	4,135±20 K
Metallicity [Fe/H]	−0.02 dex
Age	3.14 Gyr

Other designations
- υ Lib, 39 Lib, CD−27°10464, FK5 579, HD 139063, HIP 76470, HR 5794, SAO 183619

Database references
SIMBAD	data

Upsilon Librae (υ Lib, υ Librae) is the Bayer designation for a double star in the zodiac constellation Libra. With an apparent visual magnitude of 3.628, it is visible to the naked eye. The distance to this star, based upon an annual parallax shift of 14.58, is around 224 light years. It has a magnitude 10.8 companion at an angular separation of 2.0 arc seconds along a position angle of 151°, as of 2002.

The brighter component is an evolved K-type giant star with a stellar classification of K3 III. The measured angular diameter, after correction for limb darkening, is 4.27±0.05 mas. At the estimated distance of the star, this yields a physical size of about 31.5 times the radius of the Sun. It has 1.67 times the mass of the Sun and radiates 309 times the solar luminosity from its outer atmosphere at an effective temperature of 4,135 K. The star is about three billion years old.

Upsilon Librae will be the brightest star in the night sky in about 2.3 million years, and will peak in brightness with an apparent magnitude of −0.46, or more than 40 times its present-day brightness.

This star was originally designated by Bayer as Omicron Scorpii, but it was reassigned to Libra as Upsilon Librae. The star now known as Omicron Scorpii was a reinterpretation of o (Latin letter o) Scorpii, a designation given by Lacaille.
