= Iota Librae =

The Bayer designation Iota Librae (ι Lib / ι Librae) is shared by two star systems, in the constellation Libra:

- ι^{1} Librae (24 Librae), also known simply as ι Librae (iota Librae)
- ι^{2}Librae (25 Librae)

The pair have an angular separation of just 17′. They can be viewed as a double star with a pair of binoculars or a small telescope.
