= Gamma Librae =

Star in the constellation Libra

- Location of γ Librae (circled)

Observation data Epoch J2000.0 Equinox J2000.0 (ICRS)
- Constellation: Libra
- Right ascension: 15^{h} 35^{m} 31.57881^{s}
- Declination: −14° 47′ 22.3278″
- Apparent magnitude (V): +3.91

Characteristics
- Spectral type: G8.5 III

Astrometry
Radial velocity (R_{v})	−26.71 km/s
Proper motion (μ)	RA: +65.34 mas/yr Dec.: +7.45 mas/yr
Parallax (π)	19.99±0.20 mas
Distance	163 ± 2 ly (50.0 ± 0.5 pc)
Absolute magnitude (M_{V})	−1.59

Details

γ Lib A
Mass	1.15 M_{☉}
Radius	11.14 R_{☉}
Luminosity	72 L_{☉}
Surface gravity (log g)	2.81±0.18 cgs
Temperature	4826±48 K
Metallicity [Fe/H]	−0.26±0.03 dex
Rotational velocity (v sin i)	1.60 km/s
Age	4.31 Gyr

Other designations
- Zubenelhakrabi, γ Lib, 38 Lib, BD−14°4237, FK5 577, HD 138905, HIP 76333, HR 5787, SAO 159370, WDS J15355-1447A

Database references
SIMBAD	data

Gamma Librae (γ Librae, abbreviated Gamma Lib, γ Lib) is a suspected binary star system in the constellation of Libra. It is visible to the naked eye, having an apparent visual magnitude of +3.91. Based upon an annual parallax shift of 19.99 mas as seen from Earth, it lies at a distance of 163 light years.

The primary component (designated Gamma Librae A) has been formally named Zubenelhakrabi /zuːˌbɛnɛlˈhækrəbi/, the traditional name of the system.

== Nomenclature ==
γ Librae (Latinised to Gamma Librae) is the system's Bayer designation. The designations of the two components as Gamma Librae A and B derive from the convention used by the Washington Multiplicity Catalog (WMC) for multiple star systems, and adopted by the International Astronomical Union (IAU).

Gamma Librae bore the traditional name Zuben (el) Hakrabi (also rendered as Zuben-el-Akrab and corrupted as Zuben Hakraki). The name is a modification of the Arabic زبانى العقرب Zubān al-ʿAqrab "the claws of the scorpion", a name that dates to before Libra was a distinct constellation from Scorpius. In 2016, the IAU organized a Working Group on Star Names (WGSN) to catalog and standardize proper names for stars. The WGSN decided to attribute proper names to individual stars rather than entire multiple systems. It approved the name Zubenelhakrabi for the component Gamma Librae A on 5 September 2017 and it is now so included in the List of IAU-approved Star Names.

In Chinese, 氐宿 (Dī Xiù), meaning Root, refers to an asterism consisting of Gamma Librae, Alpha^{2} Librae, Iota Librae and Beta Librae. Consequently, the Chinese name for Gamma Librae itself is 氐宿三 (Dī Xiù sān), "the Third Star of Root".

== Properties ==
Because the star lies near the ecliptic it is subject to occultations by the Moon, allowing the angular size to be measured by this method. As of 1940, the pair had an angular separation of 0.10 arc seconds along a position angle of 191°.

The yellow-hued primary, component Aa, is an evolved G-type giant star with a stellar classification of G8.5 III and an estimated age of 4.3 billion years. It has 1.15 times the mass of the Sun and has expanded to 11.14 times the Sun's radius. The star is radiating around 72 times the Sun's luminosity from its enlarged photosphere at an effective temperature of 4,786 K. There is a magnitude 11.2 visual companion, component B, at an angular separation of 42.5 arc seconds along a position angle of 157°, as of 2013.

At its distance, the visual magnitude is diminished by an extinction of 0.11 due to interstellar dust. The system is moving closer to the Sun with a radial velocity of −26.71 km/s.

== Planetary system ==
Gamma Librae host two known planets, discovered in 2018 by doppler spectroscopy. The planets, named Gamma Librae b and Gamma Librae c, have orbital periods of 415 days (1.14 years) and 965 days (2.64 years), and orbital separations of 1.24 and 2.2 astronomical units.

Due to limitations of the doppler spectroscopy method, only a lower limit in the planetary masses can be measured, assuming the orbital inclination relative to Earth is a right angle. A lower inclination would imply a larger mass. Nonetheless, the inclination must be larger than 70º for the planetary system to be stable. Planet b and c have minimum masses of 1.02 and 4.58 M_{J} respectively, and hence are gas giants. They are in a 7:3 orbital resonance, so planet c make three orbits in the same amount of time planet b make seven orbits.

The Gamma Librae planetary system
Companion (in order from star)	Mass	Semimajor axis (AU)	Orbital period (days)	Eccentricity	Inclination (°)	Radius
b	1.02±0.14 M_{J}	1.24±0.10	415.2+1.8 −1.9	0.21±0.10	>70	—
c	4.58+0.45 −0.43 M_{J}	2.17±0.10	964.6 ± 3.1	0.057	>70	—
