= Libra (constellation) =

Zodiac constellation in the southern celestial hemisphere

- Constellation
- List of stars in Libra
- Abbreviation: Lib
- Genitive: Librae
- Pronunciation: /ˈliːbrə/, genitive /ˈliːbriː/
- Symbolism: the balance
- Right ascension: 15^{h}
- Declination: −15°
- Quadrant: SQ3
- Area: 538 sq. deg. (29th)
- Main stars: 4, 6
- Bayer/Flamsteed stars: 56
- Stars brighter than 3.00^{m}: 2
- Stars within 10.00 pc (32.62 ly): 5
- Brightest star: β Lib (2.61^{m})
- Nearest star: Gliese 570
- Messier objects: 0
- Meteor showers: May Librids
- Bordering constellations: Serpens Caput; Virgo; Hydra; Centaurus (corner); Lupus; Scorpius; Ophiuchus
- Visible at latitudes between +65° and −90°. Best visible at 21:00 (9 p.m.) during the month of June.

Libra /ˈliːbrə/ is a constellation of the zodiac and is located in the Southern celestial hemisphere. Its name is Latin for weighing scales. Its old astronomical symbol is (♎︎). It is fairly faint, with no first magnitude stars, and lies between Virgo to the west and Scorpius to the east. Beta Librae, also known as Zubeneschamali, is the brightest star in the constellation. Three star systems are known to have planets.

== Characteristics ==
Libra constellation map

Libra is bordered by the head of Serpens to the north, Virgo to the northwest, Hydra to the southwest, the corner of Centaurus to the southwest, Lupus to the south, Scorpius to the east and Ophiuchus to the northeast.

Covering 538.1 square degrees and 1.304% of the night sky, it ranks 29th of the 88 constellations in size. The three-letter abbreviation for the constellation, as adopted by the International Astronomical Union in 1922, is "Lib". The official constellation boundaries, as set by Eugène Delporte in 1930, are defined by a polygon of 12 segments (illustrated in infobox). In the equatorial coordinate system, the right ascension coordinates of these borders lie between 14^{h} 22^{m} 08.08^{s} and 16^{h} 02^{m} 17.23^{s}, while the declination coordinates are between −0.47° and −30.00°. The whole constellation is visible to observers south of latitude 60°N. (Note: While parts of the constellation technically rise above the horizon to observers between 60°N and 89°N, stars within a few degrees of the horizon are to all intents and purposes unobservable.)

== Features ==
=== Stars ===
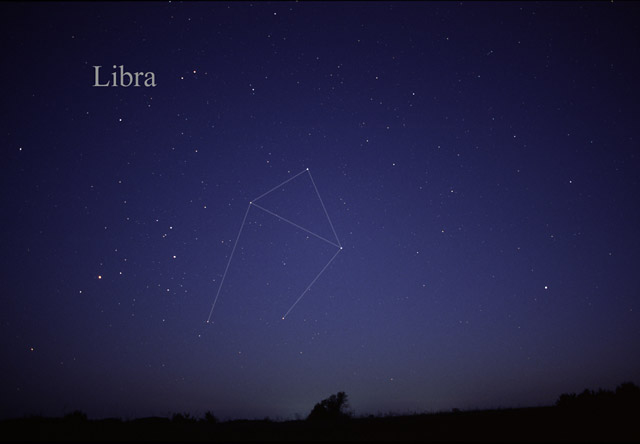
The constellation Libra marked on a naked eye view.

Overall, there are 83 stars within the constellation's borders brighter than or equal to apparent magnitude 6.5. (Note: Objects of magnitude 6.5 are among the faintest visible to the unaided eye in suburban-rural transition night skies.)

The brightest stars in Libra form a quadrangle that distinguishes it for the unaided observer. Traditionally, Alpha and Beta Librae are considered to represent the scales' balance beam, while Gamma and Sigma are the weighing pans.

Alpha Librae, called Zubenelgenubi, is a multiple star system divisible into two stars when seen through binoculars, The primary (Alpha^{2} Librae) is a blue-white star of magnitude 2.7 and the secondary (Alpha^{1} Librae) is a white star of magnitude 5.2 and spectral type F3V that is 74.9 ± 0.7 light-years from Earth. Its traditional name means "the southern claw". Zubeneschamali (Beta Librae) is the corresponding "northern claw" to Zubenelgenubi. The brightest star in Libra, Zubeneschamali is a green-tinged star of magnitude 2.6, 160 (or 185 ± 2) light-years from Earth. Gamma Librae is called Zubenelakrab, which means "the scorpion's claw", completing the suite of names referring to Libra's archaic status. It is an orange giant of magnitude 3.9, 152 light-years from Earth.

Iota Librae is a complex multiple star, 377 light-years from Earth, with both optical and true binary components in it. The primary appears as a blue-white star of magnitude 4.5; it is a binary star indivisible in even the largest amateur instruments with a period of 23 years. The secondary, visible in small telescopes as a star of magnitude 9.4, is a binary with two components, magnitudes 10 and 11. There is an optical companion to Iota Librae; 25 Librae is a star of magnitude 6.1, 219 light-years from Earth and visible in binoculars. Mu Librae is a binary star divisible in medium-aperture amateur telescopes, 235 light-years from Earth. The primary is of magnitude 5.7 and the secondary is of magnitude 6.8.

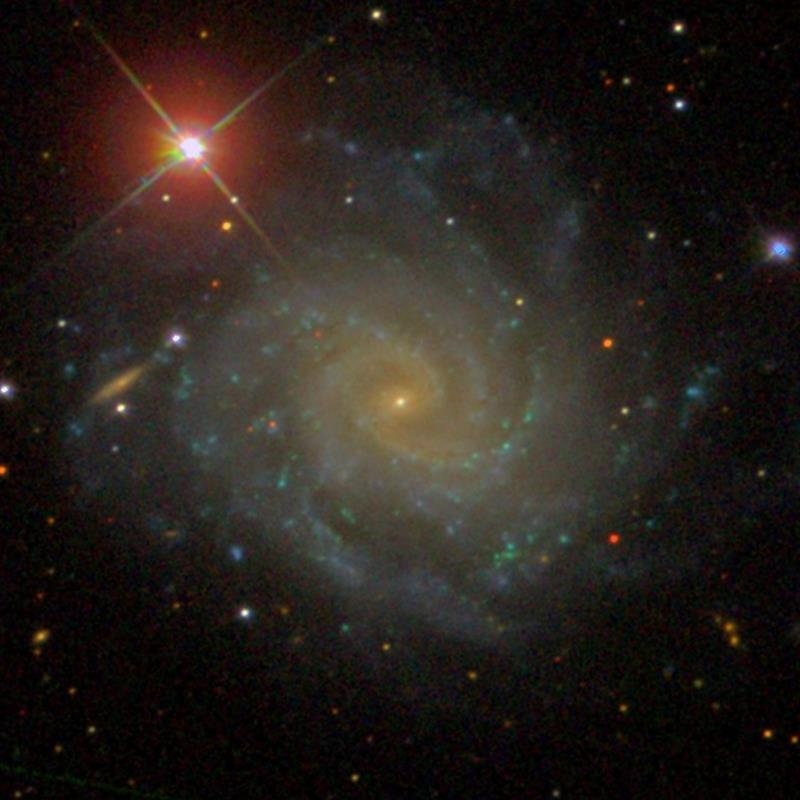
NGC 5885

Delta Librae is an Algol-type eclipsing variable star, 304 lightyears from Earth. It has a period of 2 days, 8 hours; its minimum magnitude of 5.9 and its maximum magnitude is 4.9. FX Librae, designated 48 Librae, is a shell star of magnitude 4.9. Shell stars, like Pleione and Gamma Cassiopeiae, are stars with irregular variations caused by their abnormally high speed of rotation. This ejects gas from the star's equator.

Sigma Librae (the proper name is Brachium) was formerly known as Gamma Scorpii despite being well inside the boundaries of Libra. It was not redesignated as Sigma Librae until 1851 by Benjamin A. Gould.

=== Planetary systems ===
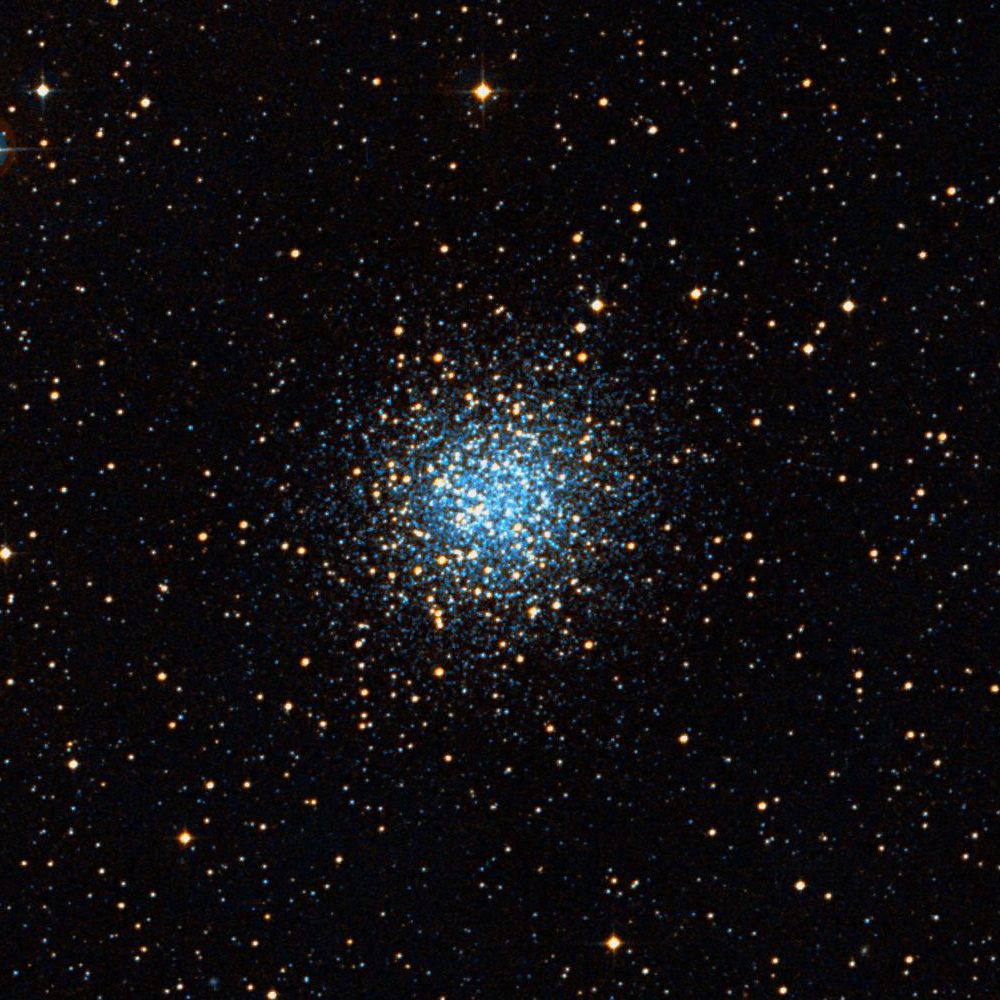
NGC 5897

Libra is home to the Gliese 581 planetary system, which consists of the star Gliese 581 and three confirmed planets. This system gained attention in the late 2000s and early 2010s as the subject of some of the earliest claims of potentially habitable exoplanets, but it is now known that Gliese 581c is too hot to be potentially habitable, and the planet candidates Gliese 581d and g likely do not exist. At the time of its discovery in 2009, Gliese 581e was the smallest mass exoplanet known orbiting a normal star.

=== Deep-sky objects ===
Libra is home to one bright globular cluster, NGC 5897. It is a loose cluster, 50,000 light-years from Earth; it is fairly large and has an integrated magnitude of 9. IC 1059 is a galaxy in the constellation Libra.

== History and mythology ==
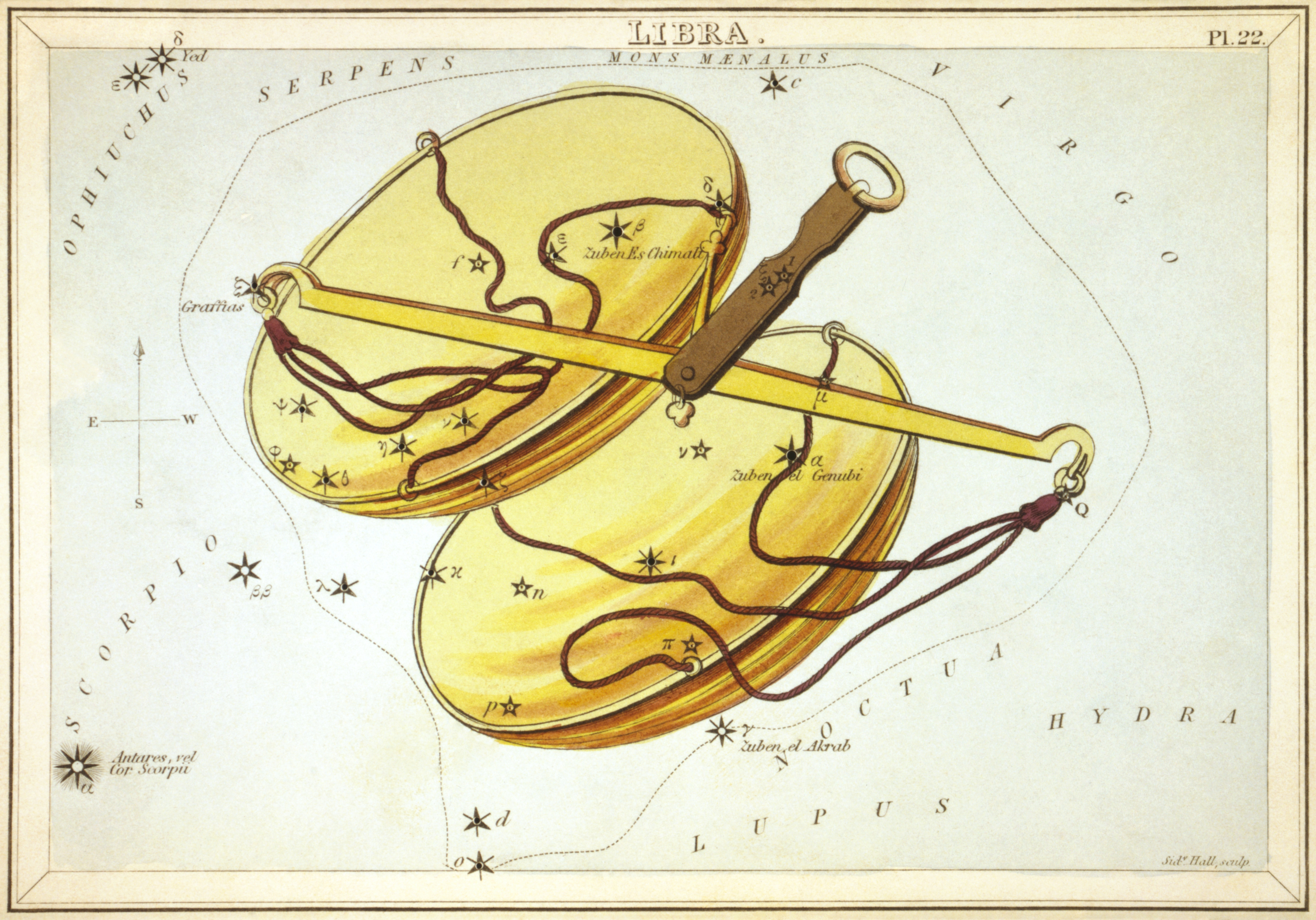
Libra as depicted in Urania's Mirror, a set of constellation cards published in London c.1825

Libra was known in Babylonian astronomy as MUL Zibanu (the "scales" or "balance"), or alternatively as the Claws of the Scorpion. The scales were held sacred to the sun god Shamash, who was also the patron of truth and justice. Since these times, Libra has been associated with law, fairness and civility.

It was also seen as the Scorpion's Claws in ancient Greece. This is the name used repeatedly by Aratus, which made it widespread in Hellenistic times: "few conspicuous stars the Claws can boast, and their dim light mid brighter gems is lost" In Arabic zubānā means "scorpion's claws", and likely similarly in other Semitic languages: this resemblance of words may be why the Scorpion's claws became the Scales. Indeed, Zubenelgenubi and Zubeneschamali, the names of the constellation's two main stars, in Arabic mean "southern claw" and "northern claw" respectively. It has also been suggested that the scales are an allusion to the fact that when the sun entered this part of the ecliptic at the autumnal equinox, the days and nights are equal. Libra's status as the location of the equinox earned the equinox the name "First Point of Libra", though this location ceased to coincide with the constellation in 730 BC because of the precession of the equinoxes.

In ancient Egypt the three brightest stars of Libra (α, β, and σ Librae) formed a constellation that was viewed as a boat. Libra is not mentioned by Eudoxus or Aratus as a constellation. Libra is mentioned by Manetho (3rd century B.C.) and Geminus (1st century B.C.), and included by Ptolemy in his 48 asterisms. Ptolemy catalogued 17 stars, Tycho Brahe 10, and Johannes Hevelius 20. It only became a constellation in ancient Rome, when it began to represent the scales held by Astraea, the goddess of justice, associated with Virgo in the Greek mythology.

The stars α, β, γ and ι form the Vishakha nakshatra in Indian astronomy. The Old Javanese 11th century text Agastyaparva records it corresponding to a folk Javanese constellation seen as a crooked building (bangun-bangunan salah ukur).

== Astrology ==
As of 2002, the Sun appears in the constellation Libra from October 31 to November 22. In tropical astrology, the Sun is considered to be in the sign Libra from the northern autumnal equinox (c. September 23) to on or about October 23, and in sidereal astrology, from October 16 to November 15.

== Namesakes ==
- Libra (AKA-12) was a United States navy ship named after the constellation.
- Tropical Storm Tembin - Four tropical cyclones in the western Pacific have been given its Japanese name.

== See also ==
- Constellation family
- Former constellations
- Libra (Chinese astronomy)
- Lists of stars by constellation

== Sources ==
- Ridpath, Ian; Tirion, Wil (2001), Stars and Planets Guide, Princeton University Press, ISBN 0-691-08913-2
- Ian Ridpath and Wil Tirion (2007). Stars and Planets Guide, Collins, London. ISBN 978-0-00-725120-9. Princeton University Press, Princeton. ISBN 978-0-691-13556-4.
