= IAU designated constellations =

Constellations recognized by the International Astronomical Union

IAU designated constellations in equirectangular projection (epoch B1875.0)

In contemporary astronomy, 88 constellations are recognized by the International Astronomical Union (IAU). Each constellation is a region of the sky bordered by arcs of right ascension and declination, together covering the entire celestial sphere. Their boundaries were officially adopted by the International Astronomical Union in 1928 and published in 1930.

The ancient Mesopotamians and later the Greeks established most of the northern constellations in international use today, listed by the Roman-Egyptian astronomer Ptolemy. The constellations along the ecliptic are called the zodiac. When explorers mapped the stars of the southern skies, European astronomers proposed new constellations for that region, as well as ones to fill gaps between the traditional constellations. Because of their Roman and European origins, every constellation has a Latin name. In 1922, the International Astronomical Union adopted three-letter abbreviations for 89 constellations, the modern list of 88 plus Argo (which was later split into Carina, Vela and Puppis). After this, Eugène Joseph Delporte drew boundaries for each of the 88 constellations so that every point in the sky belonged to one constellation. Therefore, when an object is said to lie inside a particular constellation, it is understood to be positioned within these specified boundaries.

== History ==
Some constellations are no longer recognized by the IAU but may appear in older star charts and other references. The most notable of these is Argo Navis, which was one of Ptolemy's original 48 constellations. In the 1750s, the French astronomer Nicolas Louis de Lacaille divided this into three separate constellations: Carina, Puppis, and Vela.

== Modern constellations ==
The 88 constellations depict 42 animals, 28 inanimate objects, 2 natural features (a river and Table Mountain), and 16 humans or mythological characters (two of which are centaurs, human-horse hybrids).

=== Abbreviations ===
Each IAU constellation has an official three-letter abbreviation based on the Latin genitive form of the constellation name. As the genitive is similar to the base name, the majority of the abbreviations are the first three letters of the constellation name: Ori for Orion/Orionis, Ara for Ara/Arae, and Com for Coma Berenices. Some abbreviations use letters beyond the initial three to unambiguously identify the constellation: Aps for Apus/Apodis, CrA for Corona Australis, CrB for Corona Borealis, Crv for Corvus. (Crater is abbreviated Crt to prevent confusion with CrA.) In other cases, the abbreviation contains letters from the genitive not appearing in the base name, as in Hyi for Hydrus/Hydri, to avoid confusion with Hydra, abbreviated Hya; and Sge for Sagitta/Sagittae, to avoid confusion with Sgr for Sagittarius. When letters are taken from the second word of a two-word name, the first letter from the second word is capitalised: CMa for Canis Major, CMi for Canis Minor. Two cases are ambiguous: Leo for the constellation Leo could be mistaken for Leo Minor (abbreviated LMi), and Tri for Triangulum could be mistaken for Triangulum Australe (abbreviated TrA).

In addition to the three-letter abbreviations used today, the IAU also introduced four-letter abbreviations in 1932. The four-letter abbreviations were repealed in 1955 and are now obsolete, but were included in the NASA Dictionary of Technical Terms for Aerospace Use (NASA SP-7) published in 1965. These are labeled "NASA" in the table below and are included here for reference only.

=== List ===
For help with the literary English pronunciations, see the pronunciation key. There is considerable diversity in how Latinate names are pronounced in English. For traditions closer to the original, see Latin spelling and pronunciation.

Constellation	Abbreviations		Genitive	Origin				Meaning	Brightest star		Area (sq. deg.)
Constellation	IAU	NASA	Genitive	Year	Creator	Ancient name	Split from	Meaning	Name	Vis. mag.	Area (sq. deg.)
Andromeda /ænˈdrɒmɪdə/	And	Andr	Andromedae	ancient	Ptolemy			Andromeda (mythological character)	Alpheratz	2.06	722
Antlia /ˈæntliə/	Ant	Antl	Antliae	1756	Lacaille	Antlia Pneumatica		(air) pump	α Antliae	4.25	239
Apus /ˈeɪpəs/	Aps	Apus	Apodis /ˈæpoʊdɪs/	1598	Plancius, Keyser, de Houtman (Note: With the exception of Triangulum Australe (which was mentioned but not precisely charted earlier), these southern constellations first appeared on a globe engraved by Jodocus Hondius and published by Petrus Plancius in 1598. The constellations were based on observations by Dutch navigators Pieter Dirkszoon Keyser and Frederick de Houtman, who were commissioned by Plancius to chart the southern sky on a voyage to what is now Indonesia. It is no longer clear who formed the observations into the constellations shown on the globe, and modern authors generally give credit to some combination of Kaiser, de Houtmann, and Plancius. The constellations are also widely but incorrectly attributed to Johann Bayer, since they first became widely known from his star atlas Uranometria, published in 1603.)			bird-of-paradise	Paradys	3.83	206
Aquarius /əˈkwɛəriəs/	Aqr	Aqar	Aquarii	ancient	Ptolemy			water-bearer	Sadalsuud	2.87	980
Aquila /ˈækwɪlə/	Aql	Aqil	Aquilae	ancient	Ptolemy			eagle	Altair	0.76	652
Ara /ˈɛərə/	Ara	Arae	Arae /ˈɛəriː/	ancient	Ptolemy			altar	β Arae	2.84	237
Aries /ˈɛər(i)iːz/	Ari	Arie	Arietis /əˈraɪ.ɪtɪs/	ancient	Ptolemy			ram	Hamal	2.00	441
Auriga /ɔːˈraɪɡə/	Aur	Auri	Aurigae /ɔːˈraɪdʒiː/	ancient	Ptolemy			charioteer	Capella	0.08	657
Boötes /boʊˈoʊtiːz/	Boo	Boot	Boötis	ancient	Ptolemy			herdsman	Arcturus	−0.05	907
Caelum /ˈsiːləm/	Cae	Cael	Caeli /ˈsiːlaɪ/	1756	Lacaille	Caelum Sculptorium		chisel or engraving tool	α Caeli	4.46	125
Camelopardalis /kəˌmɛloʊˈpɑːrdəlɪs/	Cam	Caml	Camelopardalis /kəˌmɛloʊˈpɑːrdəlɪs/	1613	Plancius (Note: The constellations Camelopardalis, Columba, and Monoceros, formed by Petrus Plancius in 1592 and in 1613, are often erroneously attributed to Jacob Bartsch and Augustin Royer.)			giraffe	β Camelopardalis	4.02	757
Cancer /ˈkænsər/	Cnc	Canc	Cancri	ancient	Ptolemy			crab	Tarf	3.52	506
Canes Venatici /ˈkeɪniːz vɪˈnætɪsaɪ/	CVn	CVen	Canum Venaticorum	1690	Hevelius			hunting dogs	Cor Caroli	2.81	465
Canis Major /ˈkeɪnɪs ˈmeɪdʒər/	CMa	CMaj	Canis Majoris	ancient	Ptolemy			greater dog	Sirius	−1.46	380
Canis Minor /ˈkeɪnɪs ˈmaɪnər/	CMi	CMin	Canis Minoris	ancient	Ptolemy			lesser dog	Procyon	0.34	183
Capricornus /ˌkæprɪˈkɔːrnəs/	Cap	Capr	Capricorni /ˌkæprɪˈkɔːrnaɪ/	ancient	Ptolemy			sea goat	Deneb Algedi	2.81	414
Carina /kəˈraɪnə/	Car	Cari	Carinae	ancient; 1756	Ptolemy, Lacaille		Argo Navis	keel	Canopus	−0.74	494
Cassiopeia /ˌkæsioʊˈpiːə/	Cas	Cass	Cassiopeiae /ˌkæsioʊˈpiːiː/	ancient	Ptolemy			Cassiopeia (mythological character)	Schedar	2.24	598
Centaurus /sɛnˈtɔːrəs/	Cen	Cent	Centauri	ancient	Ptolemy			centaur	Alpha Centauri	−0.27	1060
Cepheus /ˈsiːfiəs/	Cep	Ceph	Cephei /ˈsiːfiaɪ/	ancient	Ptolemy			Cepheus (mythological character)	Alderamin	2.46	588
Cetus /ˈsiːtəs/	Cet	Ceti	Ceti /ˈsiːtaɪ/	ancient	Ptolemy			sea monster (later interpreted as a whale)	Diphda	2.02	1231
Chamaeleon /kəˈmiːliən/	Cha	Cham	Chamaeleontis	1598	Plancius, Keyser, de Houtman			chameleon	α Chamaeleontis	4.06	132
Circinus /ˈsɜːrsɪnəs/	Cir	Circ	Circini	1756	Lacaille			compasses	Xami	3.19	93
Columba /koʊˈlʌmbə/	Col	Colm	Columbae	1592	Plancius,		Canis Major	dove	Phact	2.65	270
Coma Berenices /ˈkoʊmə ˌbɛrəˈnaɪsiːz/	Com	Coma	Comae Berenices /ˈkoʊmiː ˌbɛrəˈnaɪsiːz/	ancient; 1536	Ptolemy; Caspar Vopel,		Leo	Berenice's hair	β Comae Berenices	4.26	386
Corona Australis /koʊˈroʊnə ɔːˈstrælɪs, -ˈstreɪ-/	CrA	CorA	Coronae Australis	ancient	Ptolemy			southern crown	Meridiana	4.09	128
Corona Borealis /koʊˈroʊnə ˌbɔːriˈælɪs, -ˈeɪlɪs/	CrB	CorB	Coronae Borealis	ancient	Ptolemy			northern crown	Alphecca	2.24	179
Corvus /ˈkɔːrvəs/	Crv	Corv	Corvi	ancient	Ptolemy			crow	Gienah	2.59	184
Crater /ˈkreɪtər/	Crt	Crat	Crateris	ancient	Ptolemy			krater (bowl for mixing wine)	δ Crateris	3.56	282
Crux /ˈkrʌks/	Cru	Cruc	Crucis	1589	Plancius		Centaurus	cross	Acrux	0.76	68
Cygnus /ˈsɪɡnəs/	Cyg	Cygn	Cygni	ancient	Ptolemy			swan	Deneb	1.25	804
Delphinus /dɛlˈfaɪnəs/	Del	Dlph	Delphini	ancient	Ptolemy			dolphin	Rotanev	3.62	189
Dorado /dəˈrɑːdoʊ/	Dor	Dora	Doradus	1598	Plancius, Keyser, de Houtman			mahi-mahi (dolphinfish)	α Doradus	3.26	179
Draco /ˈdreɪkoʊ/	Dra	Drac	Draconis /drəˈkoʊnɪs/	ancient	Ptolemy			dragon	Eltanin	2.23	1083
Equuleus /ɪˈkwuːliəs/	Equ	Equl	Equulei /ɪˈkwuːliaɪ/	ancient	Ptolemy			pony	Kitalpha	3.92	72
Eridanus /ɪˈrɪdənəs/	Eri	Erid	Eridani /ɪˈrɪdənaɪ/	ancient	Ptolemy			river Eridanus (mythology)	Achernar	0.43	1138
Fornax /ˈfɔːrnæks/	For	Forn	Fornacis	1756	Lacaille	Fourneau Chymique		(chemical) furnace	Dalim	3.92	398
Gemini /ˈdʒɛmɪnaɪ/	Gem	Gemi	Geminorum	ancient	Ptolemy			twins (Lugal-irra and Meslamta-ea, later Castor and Pollux)	Pollux	1.14	514
Grus /ˈɡrʌs/	Gru	Grus	Gruis /ˈɡruːɪs/	1598	Plancius, Keyser, de Houtman			crane (bird)	Alnair	1.74	366
Hercules /ˈhɜːrkjʊliːz/	Her	Herc	Herculis	ancient	Ptolemy			Hercules (mythological character)	Kornephoros	2.81	1225
Horologium /ˌhɒrəˈlɒdʒiəm, -ˈloʊ-/	Hor	Horo	Horologii	1756	Lacaille			pendulum clock	α Horologii	3.85	249
Hydra /ˈhaɪdrə/	Hya	Hyda	Hydrae	ancient	Ptolemy			Hydra (mythological creature)	Alphard	2.00	1303
Hydrus /ˈhaɪdrəs/	Hyi	Hydi	Hydri	1598	Plancius, Keyser, de Houtman			lesser water snake	β Hydri	2.80	243
Indus /ˈɪndəs/	Ind	Indi	Indi	1598	Plancius, Keyser, de Houtman			Indian (of unspecified type)	α Indi	3.11	294
Lacerta /ləˈsɜːrtə/	Lac	Lacr	Lacertae	1690	Hevelius			lizard	Stellio	3.76	201
Leo /ˈliːoʊ/	Leo	Leon	Leonis	ancient	Ptolemy			lion	Regulus	1.35	947
Leo Minor /ˈliːoʊ ˈmaɪnər/	LMi	LMin	Leonis Minoris	1690	Hevelius			lesser lion	Praecipua	3.83	232
Lepus /ˈliːpəs/	Lep	Leps	Leporis /ˈlɛpərɪs/	ancient	Ptolemy			hare	Arneb	2.59	290
Libra /ˈlaɪbrə, ˈliː-/	Lib	Libr	Librae	ancient	Ptolemy			balance	Zubeneschemali	2.61	538
Lupus /ˈljuːpəs/	Lup	Lupi	Lupi	ancient	Ptolemy			wolf	Uridim	2.30	334
Lynx /ˈlɪŋks/	Lyn	Lync	Lyncis	1690	Hevelius			lynx	α Lyncis	3.14	545
Lyra /ˈlaɪrə/	Lyr	Lyra	Lyrae	ancient	Ptolemy			lyre / harp	Vega	0.03	286
Mensa /ˈmɛnsə/	Men	Mens	Mensae	1756	Lacaille	Mons Mensæ		Table Mountain (South Africa)	Hoerikwaggo	5.09	153
Microscopium /ˌmaɪkroʊˈskɒpiəm/	Mic	Micr	Microscopii	1756	Lacaille			microscope	γ Microscopii	4.68	210
Monoceros /məˈnɒsɪrəs/	Mon	Mono	Monocerotis	1613	Plancius			unicorn	β Monocerotis	3.74	482
Musca /ˈmʌskə/	Mus	Musc	Muscae /ˈmʌsiː/	1598	Plancius, Keyser, de Houtman			fly	α Muscae	2.69	138
Norma /ˈnɔːrmə/	Nor	Norm	Normae /ˈnɔːrmiː/	1756	Lacaille			carpenter's level	γ^{2} Normae	4.02	165
Octans /ˈɒktænz/	Oct	Octn	Octantis /ɒkˈtæntɪs/	1756	Lacaille			octant (instrument)	ν Octantis	3.73	291
Ophiuchus /ˌɒfiˈjuːkəs/	Oph	Ophi	Ophiuchi	ancient	Ptolemy			serpent-bearer	Rasalhague	2.07	948
Orion /oʊˈraɪən/	Ori	Orio	Orionis /oʊˈraɪənɪs, ˌɒriˈoʊnɪs/	ancient	Ptolemy			Orion (mythological character)	Rigel	0.13	594
Pavo /ˈpeɪvoʊ/	Pav	Pavo	Pavonis /pəˈvoʊnɪs/	1598	Plancius, Keyser, de Houtman			peacock	Peacock	1.94	378
Pegasus /ˈpɛɡəsəs/	Peg	Pegs	Pegasi	ancient	Ptolemy			Pegasus (mythological winged horse)	Enif	2.40	1121
Perseus /ˈpɜːrsiəs/	Per	Pers	Persei /ˈpɜːrsiaɪ/	ancient	Ptolemy			Perseus (mythological character)	Mirfak	1.82	615
Phoenix /ˈfiːnɪks/	Phe	Phoe	Phoenicis /fɪˈnaɪsɪs/	1598	Plancius, Keyser, de Houtman			phoenix	Ankaa	2.38	469
Pictor /ˈpɪktər/	Pic	Pict	Pictoris /pɪkˈtɔːrɪs/	1756	Lacaille	Equuleus Pictoris		painter (originally 'painter's easel')	α Pictoris	3.27	247
Pisces /ˈpaɪsiːz, ˈpɪ-/	Psc	Pisc	Piscium /ˈpɪʃiəm/	ancient	Ptolemy			fish (plural)	Alpherg	3.61	889
Piscis Austrinus /ˈpaɪsɪs ɔːˈstraɪnəs/	PsA	PscA	Piscis Austrini	ancient	Ptolemy			southern fish	Fomalhaut	1.16	245
Puppis /ˈpʌpɪs/	Pup	Pupp	Puppis /ˈpʌpɪs/	ancient; 1756	Ptolemy, Lacaille		Argo Navis	poop deck	Naos	2.25	673
Pyxis /ˈpɪksɪs/	Pyx	Pyxi	Pyxidis	1756	Lacaille	Pyxis Nautica		mariner's compass	α Pyxidis	3.67	221
Reticulum /rɪˈtɪkjʊləm/	Ret	Reti	Reticuli	1756	Lacaille			reticle	Rhombus	3.32	114
Sagitta /səˈdʒɪtə/	Sge	Sgte	Sagittae	ancient	Ptolemy			arrow	Telum	3.47	80
Sagittarius /ˌsædʒɪˈtɛəriəs/	Sgr	Sgtr	Sagittarii	ancient	Ptolemy			archer	Kaus Australis	1.85	867
Scorpius /ˈskɔːrpiəs/	Sco	Scor	Scorpii	ancient	Ptolemy			scorpion	Antares	0.91	497
Sculptor /ˈskʌlptər/	Scl	Scul	Sculptoris	1756	Lacaille	Apparatus Sculptoris		sculptor (originally 'sculptor's tools')	α Sculptoris	4.30	475
Scutum /ˈskjuːtəm/	Sct	Scut	Scuti	1690	Hevelius	Scutum Sobiescianum		shield (of Sobieski)	Tianbian	3.83	109
Serpens /ˈsɜːrpɛnz/	Ser	Serp	Serpentis	ancient	Ptolemy			snake	Unukalhai	2.62	637
Sextans /ˈsɛkstənz/	Sex	Sext	Sextantis /sɛksˈtæntɪs/	1690	Hevelius			sextant	α Sextantis	4.49	314
Taurus /ˈtɔːrəs/	Tau	Taur	Tauri	ancient	Ptolemy			bull	Aldebaran	0.86	797
Telescopium /ˌtɛlɪˈskɒpiəm/	Tel	Tele	Telescopii	1756	Lacaille			telescope	α Telescopii	3.51	252
Triangulum /traɪˈæŋɡjʊləm/	Tri	Tria	Trianguli	ancient	Ptolemy			triangle	Alaybasan	3.00	132
Triangulum Australe /traɪˈæŋɡjʊləm ɔːˈstræliː, -ˈstreɪ-/	TrA	TrAu	Trianguli Australis	1598	Plancius, Keyser, de Houtman			southern triangle	Atria	1.91	110
Tucana /tjuːˈkeɪnə/	Tuc	Tucn	Tucanae	1598	Plancius, Keyser, de Houtman			toucan	Lang-Exster	2.85	295
Ursa Major /ˌɜːrsə ˈmeɪdʒər/	UMa	UMaj	Ursae Majoris	ancient	Ptolemy			great bear	Alioth	1.77	1280
Ursa Minor /ˌɜːrsə ˈmaɪnər/	UMi	UMin	Ursae Minoris	ancient	Ptolemy			lesser bear	Polaris	1.98	256
Vela /ˈviːlə/	Vel	Velr	Velorum /vɪˈloʊrəm/	ancient; 1756	Ptolemy, Lacaille		Argo Navis	sails	γ Velorum	1.83	500
Virgo /ˈvɜːrɡoʊ/	Vir	Virg	Virginis	ancient	Ptolemy			virgin, maiden	Spica	0.97	1294
Volans /ˈvoʊlænz/	Vol	Voln	Volantis /voʊˈlæntɪs/	1598	Plancius, Keyser, de Houtman,	Piscis Volans		flying fish	γ Volantis	3.61	141
Vulpecula /vʌlˈpɛkjʊlə/	Vul	Vulp	Vulpeculae	1690	Hevelius	Vulpecula cum Ansere		little fox (originally, 'little fox with the goose')	Anser	4.40	268

== Asterisms ==
Various other non-IAU-designated patterns, known as asterisms, exist alongside the constellations. Some are part of one larger constellation, while others consist of stars in two adjoining constellations. Examples include the Big Dipper in Ursa Major; the Teapot in Sagittarius; the Square of Pegasus in Pegasus and Andromeda; and the False Cross in Carina and Vela.

== See also ==
- Lists of astronomical objects
- List of constellations by area
- Biblical names of stars
- Lists of stars by constellation
- Constellation family
- Galactic quadrant
