= 49 Librae =

Star in the constellation Libra

Observation data Epoch J2000 Equinox ICRS
- Constellation: Libra
- Right ascension: 16^{h} 00^{m} 19.61087^{s}
- Declination: −16° 32′ 00.5483″
- Apparent magnitude (V): 5.47

Characteristics

49 Lib Aa
- Evolutionary stage: Blue straggler
- Spectral type: F8 V
- U−B color index: +0.03
- B−V color index: +0.52

49 Lib Ab
- Evolutionary stage: White dwarf

Astrometry
Radial velocity (R_{v})	−20.1±4.0 km/s
Proper motion (μ)	RA: −644.387 mas/yr Dec.: −360.803 mas/yr
Parallax (π)	34.2281±0.1906 mas
Distance	95.3 ± 0.5 ly (29.2 ± 0.2 pc)
Absolute magnitude (M_{V})	2.89

Orbit
Period (P)	1,142.4±1.1 d
Semi-major axis (a)	2.72 AU
Eccentricity (e)	0.110±0.012
Inclination (i)	141.3+1.0 −2.0°
Longitude of the node (Ω)	163.5±2.8°
Periastron epoch (T)	57,025±22 MJD
Argument of periastron (ω) (secondary)	69.4±7.4°
Semi-amplitude (K_{1}) (primary)	3.847±0.051 km/s

Details

49 Lib Aa
Mass	1.55+0.07 −0.13 M_{☉}
Radius	1.86+0.05 −0.04 R_{☉}
Luminosity	4.74±0.03 L_{☉}
Surface gravity (log g)	3.93±0.10 cgs
Temperature	6,190±80 K
Metallicity [Fe/H]	−0.02 dex
Rotational velocity (v sin i)	9.2±0.4 km/s
Age	12±1 Gyr

49 Lib Ab
Mass	0.50+0.03 −0.04 M_{☉}

Other designations
- 49 Lib, BD−16°4196, FK5 1419, GJ 3931, HD 143333, HIP 78400, HR 5954, SAO 159625, WDS J16003-1632A

Database references
SIMBAD	data

49 Librae is a binary star system in the Zodiac constellation of Libra. It has an apparent visual magnitude of 5.47, making it faintly visible to the naked eye from dark suburban skies as a dim, yellow-white-hued star. The system is located 95 light-years away from the Sun, based on parallax, but is drifting closer with a radial velocity of −20 km/s.

The Bayer designation Phi Scorpii has been associated with this star. No star is found at the position marked φ Scorpii in Johann Bayer's Uranometria. The closest stars to that position are 48 and 49 Librae; 48 Librae is clearly shown but not given a designation while no star is shown at the position of 49 Librae. In his Uranographia Bode assigned the designation φ Scorpii to the star now known as 49 Librae. The designation is no longer in use.

== Characteristics ==
This is a single-lined spectroscopic binary system, first spotted to have a variable radial velocity by W. S. Adams in 1924. Both stars take 3.128 years to orbit around the system's center of mass and have a rather low an eccentricity of 0.11.

The primary component has a stellar classification of F8 V or F9 V, which at first would indicate it is an F-type main-sequence star. Such star would have an age around 2.3 billion years, consistent with a Population I star. However, the space velocity and chemical composition of this star is inconsistent with that of a Pop I star, indicating it is a much older (over 12 billion years) Population II star. To account for its evolutionary stage, which is too young for such age, it has been proposed 49 Lib A is a blue straggler that was once smaller but gained mass after interacting gravitationally with the secondary.

The secondary is a white dwarf with half the mass of the Sun. The system is a source for radio and X-ray emissions, which may be coming from the secondary companion.

== Evolution ==
Initially both components were G-type main-sequence stars separated by 1.50 AU. The primary had a mass of 1.00±0.03 M_{☉}, while the secondary had 1.05±0.02 M_{☉}.

The stars then started to evolve, becoming red giants. Mass transfer between components started to happen. The end product was the secondary becoming the current white dwarf with half of its original mass, and the primary gaining 0.55 M_{☉} and becoming a F-type star.

Within 500 million years, the primary will evolve and 49 Librae may become a double white-dwarf system. However, if the secondary accrete sufficient mass during the process, the system may instead undergo a Type Ia supernova.

== See also ==
- List of supernova candidates
