= Phi Scorpii =

The Bayer designation φ Sco (Phi Scorpii) has been associated with two stars in the constellation of Libra:

- 48 Librae
- 49 Librae

No star is found at the position marked φ Scorpii in Johann Bayer's Uranometria. The closest stars to that position are 48 and 49 Librae; 48 Librae is clearly shown but not given a designation while no star is shown at the position of 49 Librae. In his Uranographia Bode assigned the designation φ Scorpii to the star now known as 49 Librae. The designation is no longer in use.
