= 48 Librae =

Star in the constellation Libra

- Location of 48 Librae (circled in red)

Observation data Epoch J2000 Equinox ICRS
- Constellation: Libra
- Right ascension: 15^{h} 58^{m} 11.36869^{s}
- Declination: −14° 16′ 45.6894″
- Apparent magnitude (V): 4.95

Characteristics
- Evolutionary stage: main sequence
- Spectral type: B3 Vsh
- B−V color index: −0.08±0.11
- Variable type: γ Cas

Astrometry
Radial velocity (R_{v})	−7.5±1.8 km/s
Proper motion (μ)	RA: −12.44 mas/yr Dec.: −16.73 mas/yr
Parallax (π)	6.97±0.24 mas
Distance	470 ± 20 ly (143 ± 5 pc)
Absolute magnitude (M_{V})	−0.83

Details
Mass	6.07 M_{☉}
Radius	4.12 R_{☉}
Luminosity	1,100 L_{☉}
Surface gravity (log g)	3.71±0.04 cgs
Temperature	18,000±180 K
Rotation	9.6 hours
Rotational velocity (v sin i)	400 km/s
Age	10 Myr

Other designations
- 48 Lib, FX Lib, AAVSO 1552-14, BD−13°4302, FK5 1417, HD 142983, HIP 78207, HR 5941, SAO 159607

Database references
SIMBAD	data

48 Librae is a single shell star in the constellation Libra. It is a variable star with the designation FX Lib, ranging in magnitude from 4.74 to 4.96. Based upon an annual parallax shift of 6.97±0.24 mas as seen from Earth's orbit, it is located approximately 470 light years from the Sun. It is a candidate member of the Upper Scorpius group of the Scorpius–Centaurus association, with the former having an age of about 11 million years.

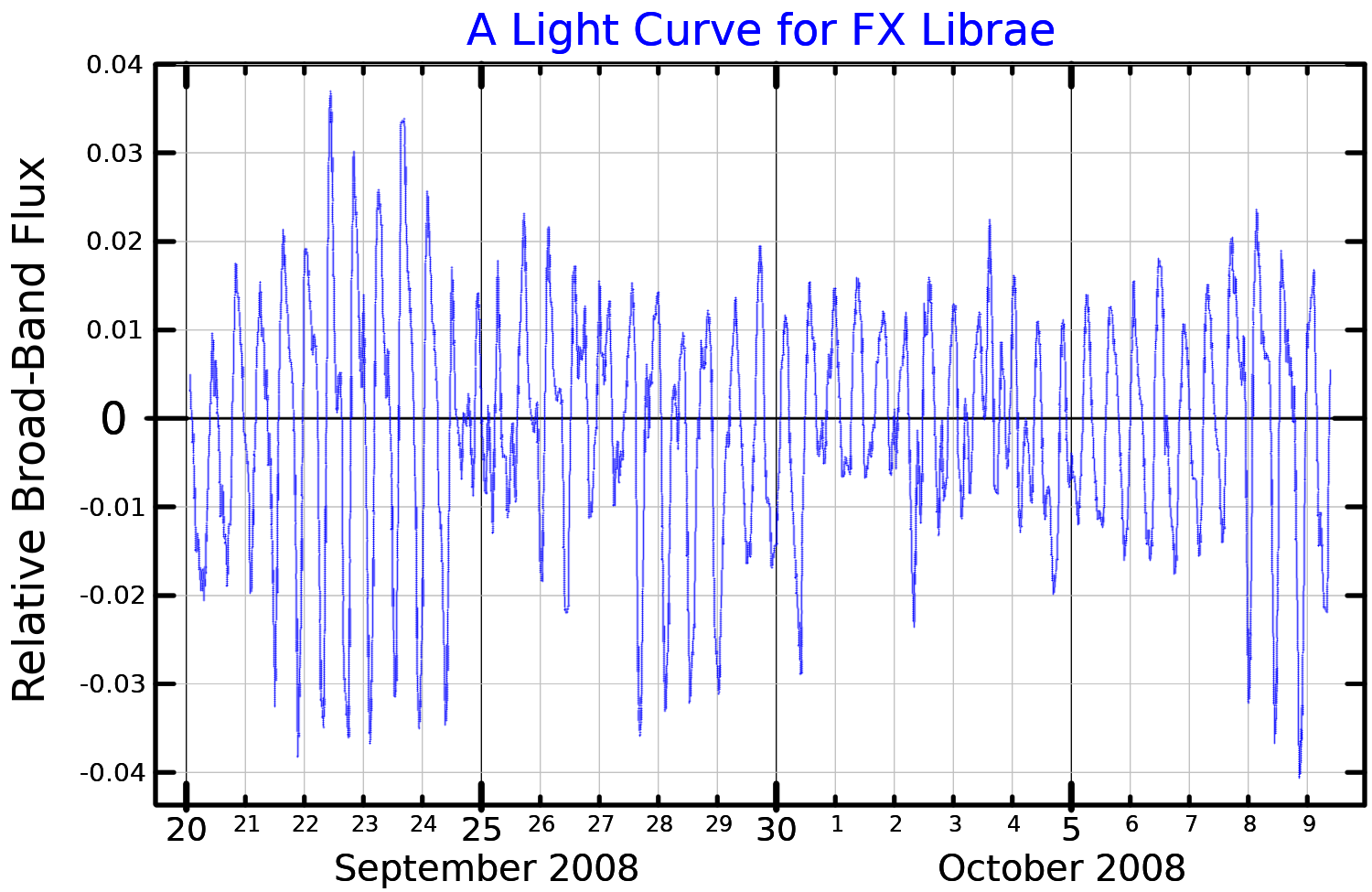
A broad-band optical light curve for FX Librae, adapted from Ozuyar et al. (2018)

This is a main sequence Be star with a stellar classification of B3 Vsh, although it has been variously classed as B3V, B5IIIp shell He-n, B6p shell, B4III, B3IV:e-shell, and B3 shell by different sources. As is the norm for a shell star, it is spinning very rapidly with a projected rotational velocity of 400 km/s − matching or exceeding 80% of the critical velocity. This is giving the star a pronounced oblate shape with an equatorial bulge that is estimated to be 43% larger than the polar radius. It has six times the mass of the Sun and four times the Sun's radius. The star is radiating 1,100 times the Sun's luminosity from its photosphere at an effective temperature of 18,000 K.

The surrounding gaseous disk stretches out to at least 15 times the star's radius and is nearly aligned with the line of sight from the Earth, having an estimated inclination of 85°±3°. Some time between 1931 and 1935, the disk became active and has remained so since that time, becoming the subject of multiple studies. The unusual asymmetry in its emission lines have led to it being misclassified as a supergiant of type B8 Ia/Ib by SIMBAD and others. This asymmetry displays quasi-periodic behavior of the type found in about a third of all Be stars, with a period of about 10 to 17 years. This variation may arise from the precession of a one-armed density wave in the disk.

The Bayer designation Phi Scorpii has been associated with this star. No star is found at the position marked φ Scorpii in Johann Bayer's Uranometria. The closest stars to that position are 48 and 49 Librae; 48 Librae is clearly shown but not given a designation while no star is shown at the position of 49 Librae. In his Uranographia Bode assigned the designation φ Scorpii to the star now known as 49 Librae. The designation is no longer in use.
