= Heavenly Waters =

Heavenly Waters is either:

- A family of constellations; see Heavenly Waters (astronomy); or
- A song from the album The Decline of British Sea Power.
