= Bayer (crater) =

Lunar surface depression

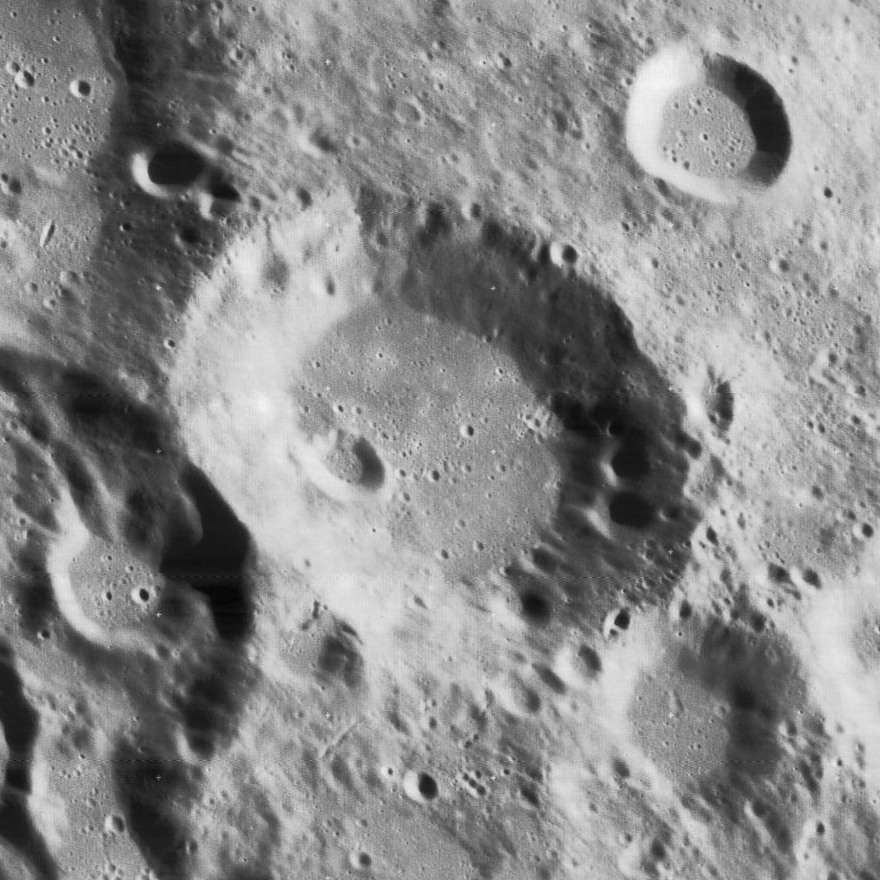
- Lunar Orbiter 4 image
- Coordinates: 51.6°S 35.0°W
- Diameter: 48.51 km (30.14 mi)
- Depth: 2.0 km (1.2 mi)
- Colongitude: 35° at sunrise
- Eponym: Johann Bayer

Bayer is a lunar impact crater located in the southwest section of the moon, to the east of the crater Schiller. To the south is Rost.

The rim of Bayer is slightly worn by erosion, but remains well-defined. There is an inner terrace, but the outer wall is intruded upon by nearby impacts. The most significant of these is Schiller H, which forms a ridge attached to the northwest rim of Bayer. The floor of Bayer is relatively flat and lacks a central peak. There is a small, but notable crater on the floor near the western wall, Bayer G. This crater has a breach in its northern rim.

This crater is named after German lawyer and astronomer Johann Bayer (1572-1625), the first person to produce a sky atlas that covered the entire celestial sphere. The formation's designation was formally adopted by the International Astronomical Union in 1935.

== Satellite craters ==
By convention these features are identified on Lunar maps by placing the letter on the side of the crater midpoint that is closest to Bayer.

Bayer	Latitude	Longitude	Diameter
A	51.3° S	30.3° W	18 km
B	48.8° S	28.2° W	18 km
C	49.7° S	31.2° W	22 km
D	47.9° S	29.8° W	20 km
E	51.7° S	32.3° W	29 km
F	53.0° S	31.6° W	20 km
G	51.7° S	35.3° W	7 km
H	53.5° S	32.5° W	27 km
J	52.5° S	33.6° W	18 km
K	50.2° S	34.0° W	16 km
L	47.5° S	33.6° W	14 km
M	50.6° S	31.0° W	10 km
N	48.3° S	29.2° W	9 km
P	51.6° S	29.5° W	4 km
R	52.5° S	35.5° W	9 km
S	52.3° S	36.4° W	13 km
T	49.2° S	30.1° W	8 km
U	48.4° S	31.3° W	10 km
V	47.5° S	31.6° W	9 km
W	48.0° S	33.5° W	9 km
X	53.4° S	33.6° W	8 km
Y	49.2° S	35.7° W	31 km
Z	49.0° S	33.4° W	7 km
