= Pieter Dirkszoon Keyser =

Dutch navigator and celestial cartographer

- Born: Unknown date, c. 1540; Emden, County of East Frisia
- Died: 11 September 1596 (aged 55–56); Sunda Strait, East Indies
- Other names: Petrus Theodorus
- Occupation(s): Celestial cartographer, navigator
- Known for: Charting of constellations on the southern celestial hemisphere

Pieter Dirkszoon Keyser (occasionally Petrus Theodorus; c. 1540 – 11 September 1596) was a Dutch navigator and celestial cartographer who mapped several constellations on the southern celestial hemisphere.

== Voyages and star observation ==
Little is known of Keyser's life outside of his astronomical observations and East Indies voyages. After making several voyages under the Portuguese flag, including one to Brazil, Keyser participated as the chief navigator and head of the steersmen for the first Dutch voyage to the East Indies (the "Eerste Schipvaart"), which left Texel with four ships on 2 April 1595 under Cornelis de Houtman. He had been trained by cartographer Petrus Plancius in mathematics and astronomy. Plancius, a key promoter to the Dutch East Indies expeditions, had instructed Keyser to map the skies in the southern hemisphere, which were largely uncharted at the time. When the fleet finally was able to obtain fresh supplies at Madagascar on 13 September 71 of the 248 sailors had died, most of scurvy. The surviving crew stayed for several months on the island, to recover and make repairs, at which point Keyser probably made most of his celestial observations. He was aided in this by Frederick de Houtman and Vechter Willemsz. After leaving Madagascar, it took another four months (February to June 1596) for the ships to reach Sumatra and finally Bantam on Java. Trade negotiations went sour, perhaps caused by Portuguese instigators, perhaps by inexperience, and the crew was forced to find drinking water and other supplies on Sumatra across the Sunda Strait. Keyser died during this crossing on 13 September 1596.

On 14 August 1597, 81 survivors including Frederick de Houtman made it back to Texel. All the scientific observations gathered on the voyage were turned over to Petrus Plancius.

== Constellations ==
From the observations of the expedition, Plancius created a celestial globe in late 1597, published by Jodocus Hondius, showing twelve new constellations of the southern sky that have become accepted among the standard constellations codified by modern astronomers. The majority were named after various animals that 16th century explorers had encountered (e.g. Bird of Paradise, Chameleon, Toucan, Flying Fish). Willem Janszoon Blaeu copied these constellations on a 1602 globe and created a new globe in 1603 incorporating further observations made by de Houtman on a second voyage to the East Indies. Johann Bayer included these new southern constellations in his influential 1603 star atlas Uranometria, crediting them to "Petrus Theodori" (Pieter Keyser), but not acknowledging their earlier publication. Bayer is therefore often mistakenly credited for introducing them.

Keyser is commemorated by minor planet (10655) Pietkeyser.
