= Frederick de Houtman =

Dutch navigator, colonial governor (c.1571–1627)

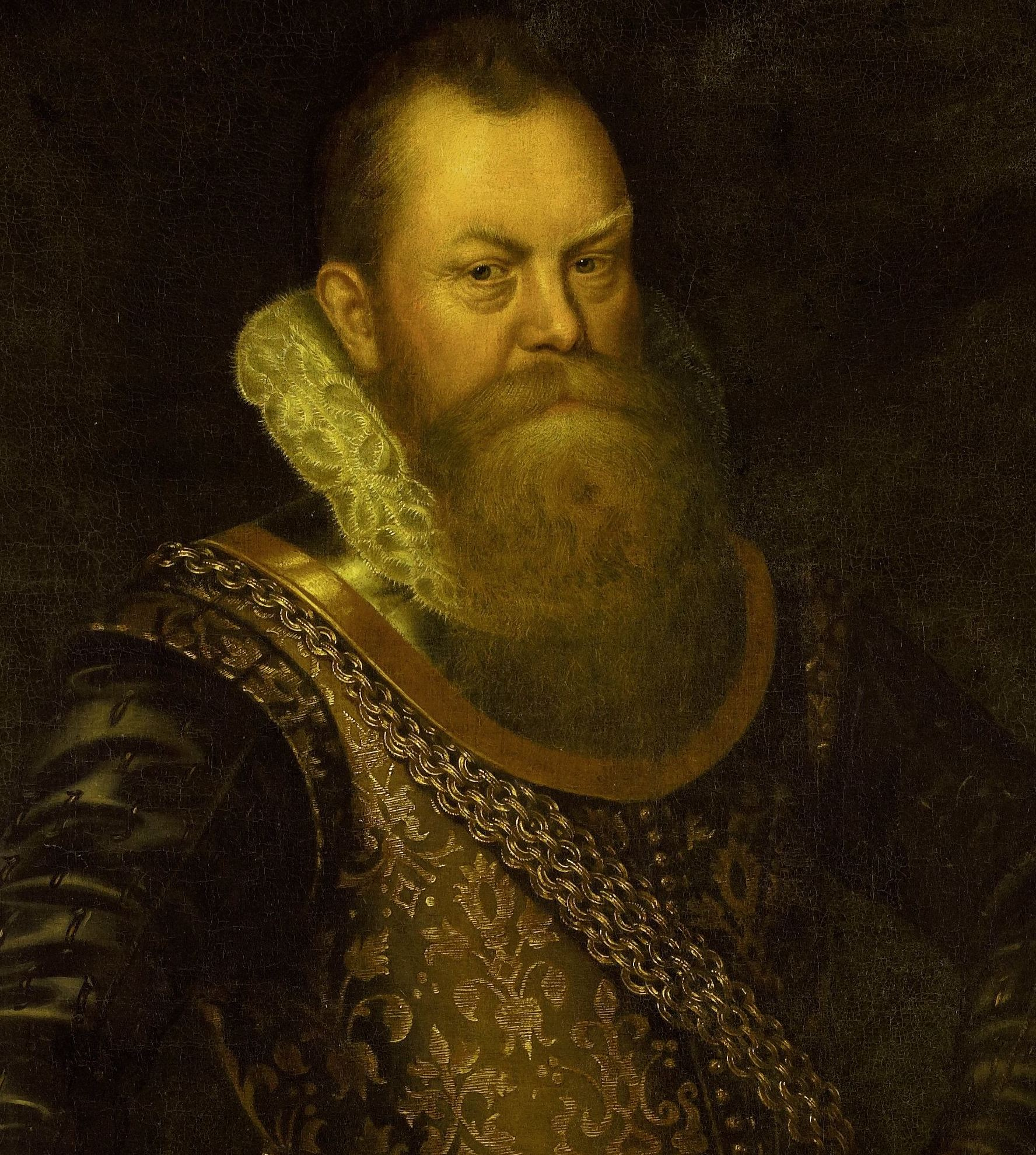
- De Houtman c. 1615

Governor of the Moluccas
- In office 11 July 1621 – 25 February 1623
- Preceded by: Laurens Reael
- Succeeded by: Jacques le Fèbre

Governor of Amboyna
- In office 1 March 1605 – 18 February 1611
- Preceded by: Office established
- Succeeded by: Caspar Janszoon

Personal details
- Born: Frederik de Houtman; Unknown date, c. 1571 Gouda, Seventeen Provinces
- Died: 21 October 1627 (aged 55–56) Alkmaar, Dutch Republic
- Spouse: Vrouwtje Cornelisdr Clock
- Relatives: Cornelis de Houtman (brother)
- Occupation: Explorer; navigator; governor
- Employer: Compagnie van Verre; Veersche Compagnie; Dutch East India Company
- Expeditions: First East Indies expedition; Second East Indies expedition

Frederick de Houtman (c. 1571 – 21 October 1627) was a Dutch explorer, navigator, and colonial governor who sailed on the first Dutch expedition to the East Indies from 1595 until 1597, during which time he made observations of the southern celestial hemisphere and contributed to the creation of 12 new southern constellations.

== Early life ==
Frederick de Houtman was born about 1571 in Gouda, in the Dutch Republic, the son of Pieter Cornelisz and his wife Agnes (née Frederiksd.). He had an elder brother, Cornelis de Houtman.

== Career ==
=== East Indies ===
Frederick de Houtman began his career in partnership with his elder brother, Cornelis, taking part in early Dutch attempts to challenge the Portuguese monopoly on the East Indies spice trade.

De Houtman assisted fellow Dutch navigator Pieter Dirkszoon Keyser with astronomical observations during the first Dutch expedition to the East Indies from 1595 until 1597. In 1598, de Houtman sailed on a second expedition led by his brother, Cornelis de Houtman, who was killed during the voyage. Frederick was imprisoned by the Sultan of Aceh, Alauddin Riayat Syah, in northern Sumatra.

De Houtman spent roughly two years in captivity between 1599 and 1601. During this period he studied the Malay language, the principal language of trade in the region, and began compiling vocabulary from daily use. After his return to Amsterdam in 1602, he developed these notes into a Malay–Dutch dictionary. Published a year later in 1603, it was among the earliest printed works to systematize the language for European readers.

He also used this time to make astronomical observations. These observations supplemented those made by Keyser on the first expedition. The constellations formed from their observations were first published in 1597 or 1598 on a globe by Petrus Plancius, and later globes incorporated adjustments based on De Houtman's later observations.

Credit for these constellations is generally assigned jointly to Keyser, De Houtman, and Plancius, though some of the underlying stars were known beforehand. The constellations are also widely associated with Johann Bayer, who included them in his celestial atlas, Uranometria, in 1603. After De Houtman's return to Europe, De Houtman published his stellar observations in an appendix to his dictionary and grammar of the Malayan and Malagasy languages.

=== Australia ===
In 1619 De Houtman sailed in the Dutch East India Company ship Dordrecht, along with Jacob Dedel in the Amsterdam. They sighted the Australian coast near present-day Perth, which they called Dedelsland. After sailing northwards along the coast he encountered and only narrowly avoided a group of shoals, subsequently called the Houtman Abrolhos.

De Houtman then made landfall in the region known as Eendrachtsland, which the explorer Dirk Hartog had encountered earlier. In his journal, De Houtman identified these coasts as Locach, mentioned by Marco Polo to have been a country far south of China and indicated as such on maps by cartographers Plancius and Linschoten.

== Death ==
Frederick de Houtman died on 21 October 1627, probably aged about 56; his exact date of birth remains unknown.

== See also ==
- John Davis – English explorer who accompanied De Houtman on the first East Indies' expedition as its pilot
