= Constellation =

Group of stars on the celestial sphere

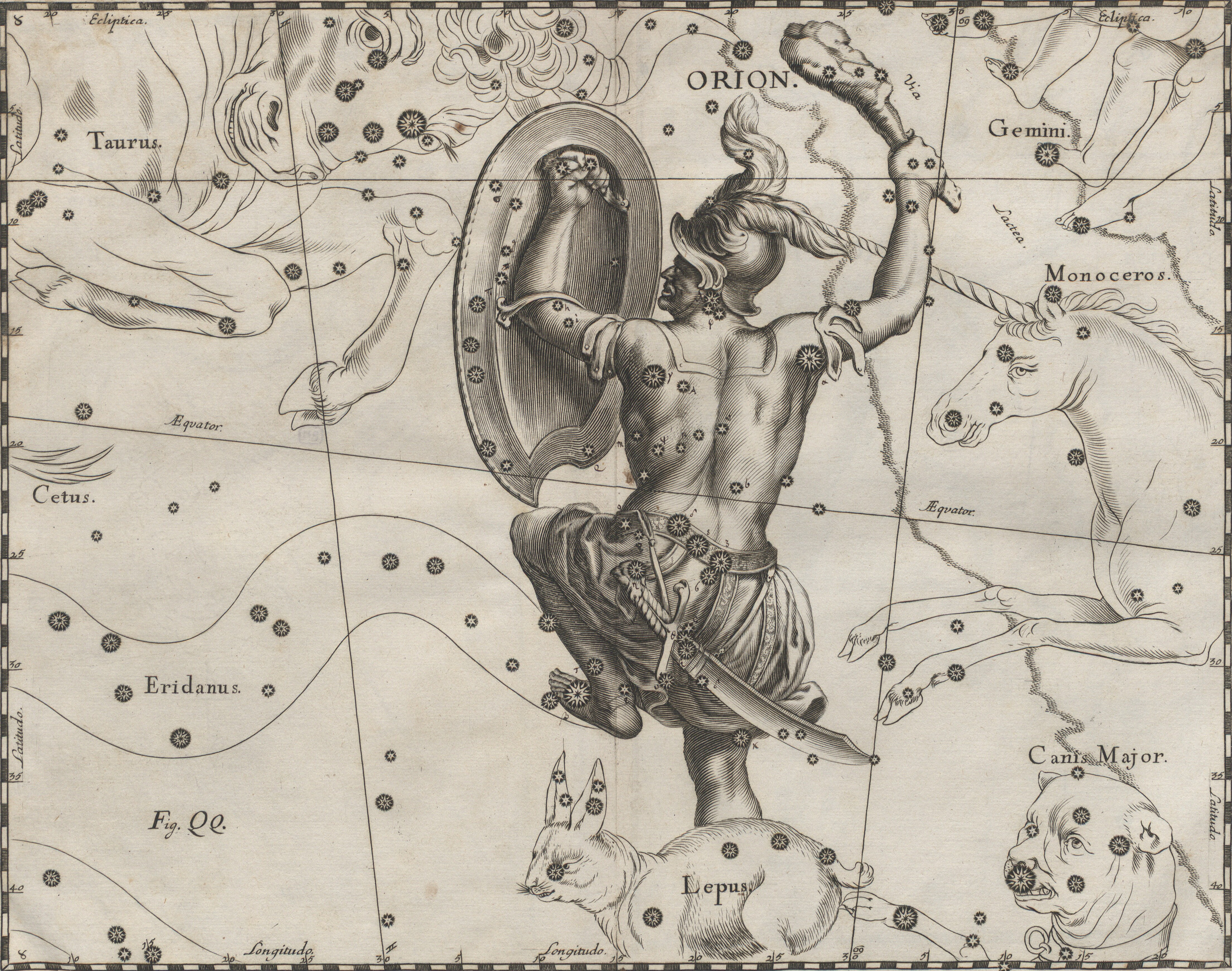
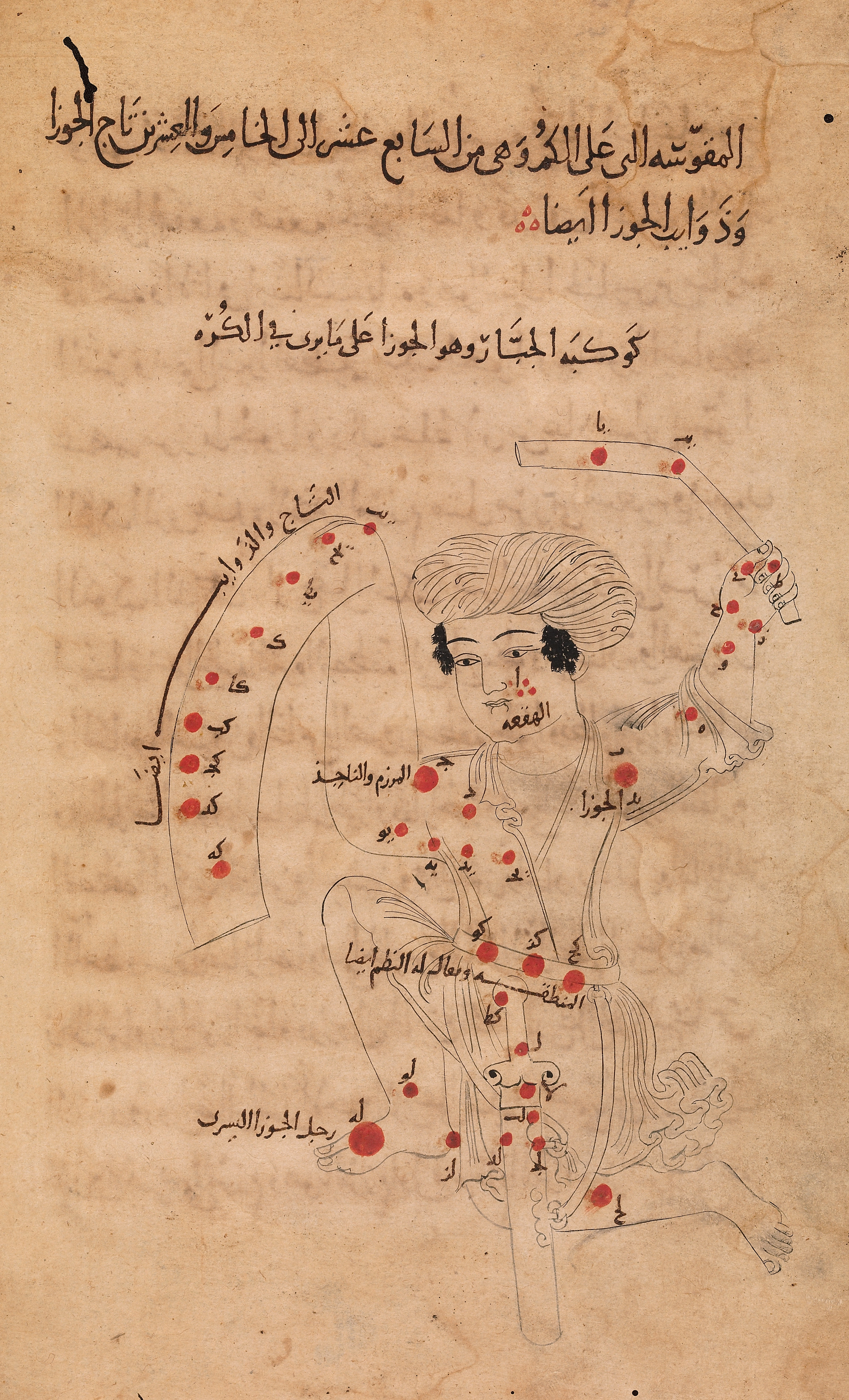
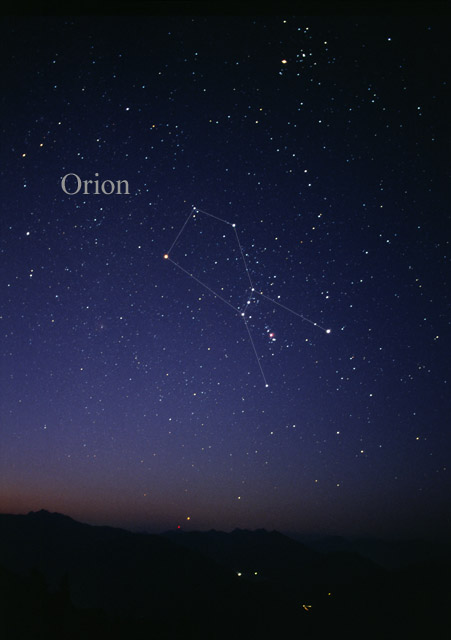

Four views of the constellation Orion:

- Top left: Baroque drawing of Orion from Johannes Hevelius' star atlas Firmamentum Sobiescianum, showing the stars as they would appear to an observer looking down upon the imaginary celestial sphere from the outside
- Top right: Illustration from the medieval Persian astronomical text Book of Fixed Stars
- Bottom left: Contemporary map of Orion from the IAU
- Bottom right: Photograph of the night sky with drawn lines

A constellation is an area on the celestial sphere in which a group of visible stars forms a perceived pattern or outline, typically representing an animal, mythological subject, or inanimate object.

The first constellations were likely defined in prehistory. People used them to relate stories of their beliefs, experiences, creation, and mythology. Different cultures and countries invented their own constellations, some of which lasted into the early 20th century before today's constellations were internationally recognized. The recognition of constellations has changed significantly over time. Many changed in size or shape. Some became popular, only to drop into obscurity. Some were limited to a single culture or nation. Naming constellations also helped astronomers and navigators identify stars more easily.

Twelve (or thirteen) ancient constellations belong to the zodiac (straddling the ecliptic, which the Sun, Moon, and planets all traverse). The origins of the zodiac remain historically uncertain; its astrological divisions became prominent c. 400 BC in Babylonian or Chaldean astronomy. Constellations appear in Western culture via Greece and are mentioned in the works of Hesiod, Eudoxus and Aratus. The traditional 48 constellations, consisting of the zodiac and 36 more (now 38, following the division of Argo Navis into three constellations) are listed by Ptolemy, a Greco-Roman astronomer from Alexandria, Egypt, in his Almagest. The formation of constellations was the subject of extensive mythology, most notably in the Metamorphoses of the Latin poet Ovid. Constellations in the far southern sky were added from the 15th century until the mid-18th century when European explorers began traveling to the Southern Hemisphere.

In 1922, the International Astronomical Union (IAU) formally accepted the modern list of 88 constellations, and in 1928 adopted official constellation boundaries that together cover the entire celestial sphere. Any given point in a celestial coordinate system lies in one of the modern constellations. Some astronomical naming systems include the constellation where a given celestial object is found to convey its approximate location in the sky. The Flamsteed designation of a star, for example, consists of a number and the genitive form of the constellation's name.

Other star patterns or groups called asterisms are not constellations under the formal definition, but are also used by observers to navigate the night sky. Asterisms may be several stars within a constellation, or they may share stars with more than one constellation. Examples of asterisms include the teapot within the constellation Sagittarius, or the Big Dipper in the constellation of Ursa Major.

== Terminology ==
The word constellation comes from the Late Latin term cōnstellātiō, which can be translated as "set of stars"; it came into use in Middle English during the 14th century. The Ancient Greek word for constellation is ἄστρον (astron). These terms historically referred to any recognisable pattern of stars whose appearance was associated with mythological characters or creatures, earthbound animals, or objects. Over time, among European astronomers, the constellations became clearly defined and widely recognised. In the 20th century, the International Astronomical Union (IAU) recognized 88 constellations, each of which has a Latin name.

A constellation or star that never sets below the horizon when viewed from a particular latitude on Earth is termed circumpolar. From the North Pole or South Pole, all constellations south or north of the celestial equator are circumpolar. Depending on the definition, equatorial constellations may include those that lie between declinations 45° north and 45° south, or those that pass through the declination range of the ecliptic (or zodiac) ranging between 23.5° north and 23.5° south.

Stars in constellations can appear near each other in the sky, but they usually lie at a variety of distances away from the Earth. Since each star has its own independent motion, all constellations will change slowly over time. After tens to hundreds of thousands of years, familiar outlines will become unrecognizable. Astronomers can predict the past or future constellation outlines by measuring common proper motions of individual stars by accurate astrometry and their radial velocities by astronomical spectroscopy.

The 88 constellations recognized by the IAU as well as those by cultures throughout history are imagined figures and shapes derived from the patterns of stars in the observable sky. Many officially recognized constellations are based on the imaginations of ancient Near Eastern and Mediterranean mythologies. Some of these stories seem to relate to the appearance of the constellations, e.g. the assassination of Orion by Scorpius, their constellations appearing at opposite times of year.

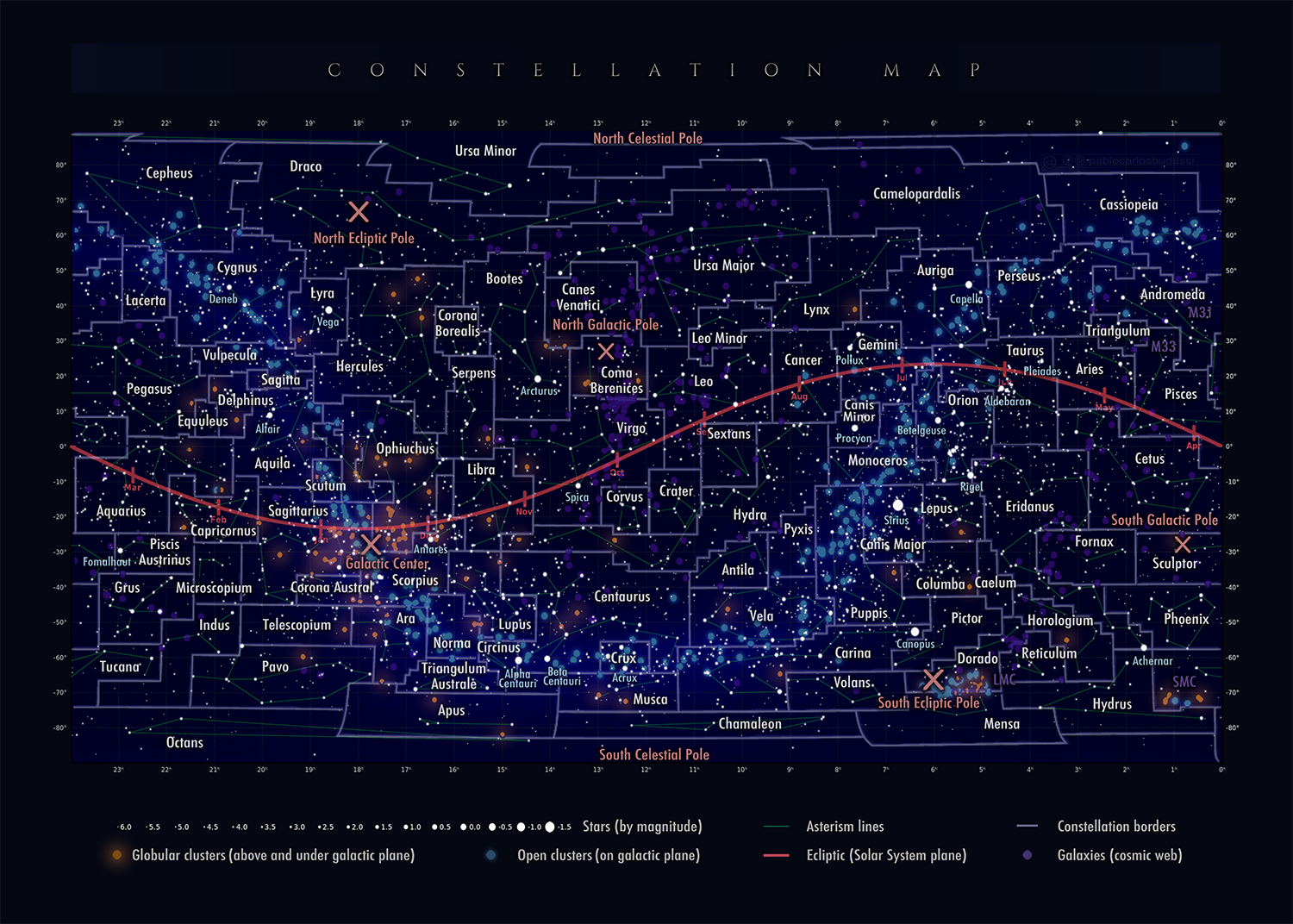
Star chart showing the constellations, Milky Way, and ecliptic

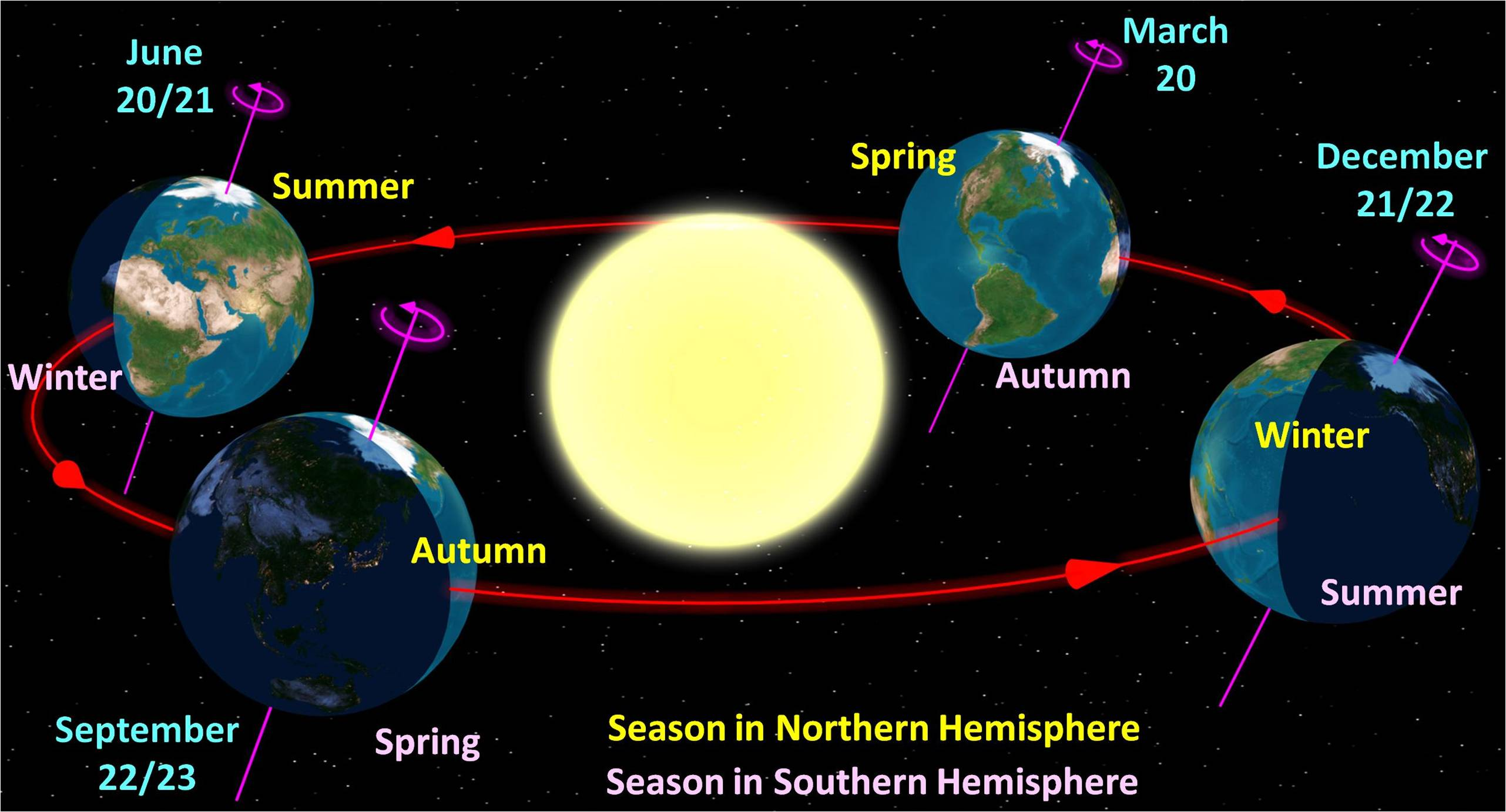
The relationship of the Earth's tilt to the Sun's apparent path governs how the zodiac will be orientated overnight.

== Observation ==
Constellation positions change throughout the year due to night on Earth occurring at gradually different portions of its orbit around the Sun. As Earth rotates toward the east, the celestial sphere appears to rotate west, with stars circling counterclockwise around the northern pole star and clockwise around the southern pole star.

Because of Earth's 23.5° axial tilt, the zodiac is distributed equally across hemispheres (along the ecliptic), approximating a great circle. Zodiacal constellations of the northern sky are Pisces, Aries, Taurus, Gemini, Cancer, and Leo. In the southern sky are Virgo, Libra, Scorpius, Sagittarius, Capricornus, and Aquarius. (Note: Astrological signs correspond to the period of a constellation's invisibility due to the Sun's transit.) The ecliptic appears overhead from latitudes of 23.5° north to 23.5° south. In both hemispheres, the zodiac appears low during summer and high during winter, while due to the Earth's tilt, it descends nightly during spring and ascends in autumn.

The Solar System's tilt produces a 60° inclination of the ecliptic from the galactic plane of the Milky Way. The planes intersect between Taurus and Gemini as well as Scorpius and Sagittarius; the Galactic Center is oriented near the latter. The galaxy appears to pass through Aquila (near the celestial equator) and northern constellations Cygnus, Cassiopeia, Perseus, Auriga, and Orion (near Betelgeuse), as well as Monoceros (near the celestial equator), and southern constellations Puppis, Vela, Carina, Crux, Centaurus, Triangulum Australe, and Ara.

=== Northern hemisphere ===
Polaris, being the North Star, is the approximate center of the northern celestial hemisphere. It is part of Ursa Minor, constituting the end of the Little Dipper's handle.

From latitudes of around 35° north, in January, Ursa Major (containing the Big Dipper) appears to the northeast, while Cassiopeia is the northwest. To the west are Pisces (above the horizon) and Aries. To the southwest Cetus is near the horizon. Up high and to the south are Orion and Taurus. To the southeast above the horizon is Canis Major. Appearing above and to the east of Orion is Gemini: also in the east (and progressively closer to the horizon) are Cancer and Leo. In addition to Taurus, Perseus and Auriga appear overhead.

From the same latitude, in July, Cassiopeia (low in the sky) and Cepheus appear to the northeast. Ursa Major is now in the northwest. Boötes is high up in the west. Virgo is to the west, with Libra southwest and Scorpius south. Sagittarius and Capricorn are southeast. Cygnus (containing the Northern Cross) is to the east. Hercules is high in the sky along with Corona Borealis.

The Southern Cross in Crux and the 'Southern Pointers' of Centaurus can be used to find the southern pole star, Sigma Octantis.

=== Southern hemisphere ===
January constellations include Pictor and Reticulum (near Hydrus and Mensa, respectively).

In July, Ara (adjacent to Triangulum Australe) and Scorpius can be seen.

Constellations near the pole star include Chamaeleon, Apus and Triangulum Australe (near Centaurus), Pavo, Hydrus, and Mensa.

Sigma Octantis is the closest star approximating a southern pole star, but is faint in the night sky. Thus, the pole can be triangulated using the constellation Crux as well as the stars Alpha and Beta Centauri (about 30° counterclockwise from Crux) of the constellation Centaurus (arching over Crux).

== History of the early constellations ==
=== Lascaux Caves, southern France ===
It has been suggested that the 17,000-year-old cave paintings in Lascaux, southern France, depict star constellations such as Taurus, Orion's Belt, and the Pleiades. However, this view is not generally accepted among scientists.

=== Mesopotamia ===
Inscribed stones and clay writing tablets from Mesopotamia (in modern Iraq) dating to 3000 BC provide the earliest generally accepted evidence for humankind's identification of constellations. It seems that the bulk of the Mesopotamian constellations were created within a relatively short interval from around 1300 to 1000 BC. Mesopotamian constellations appeared later in many of the classical Greek constellations.

=== Ancient Near East ===
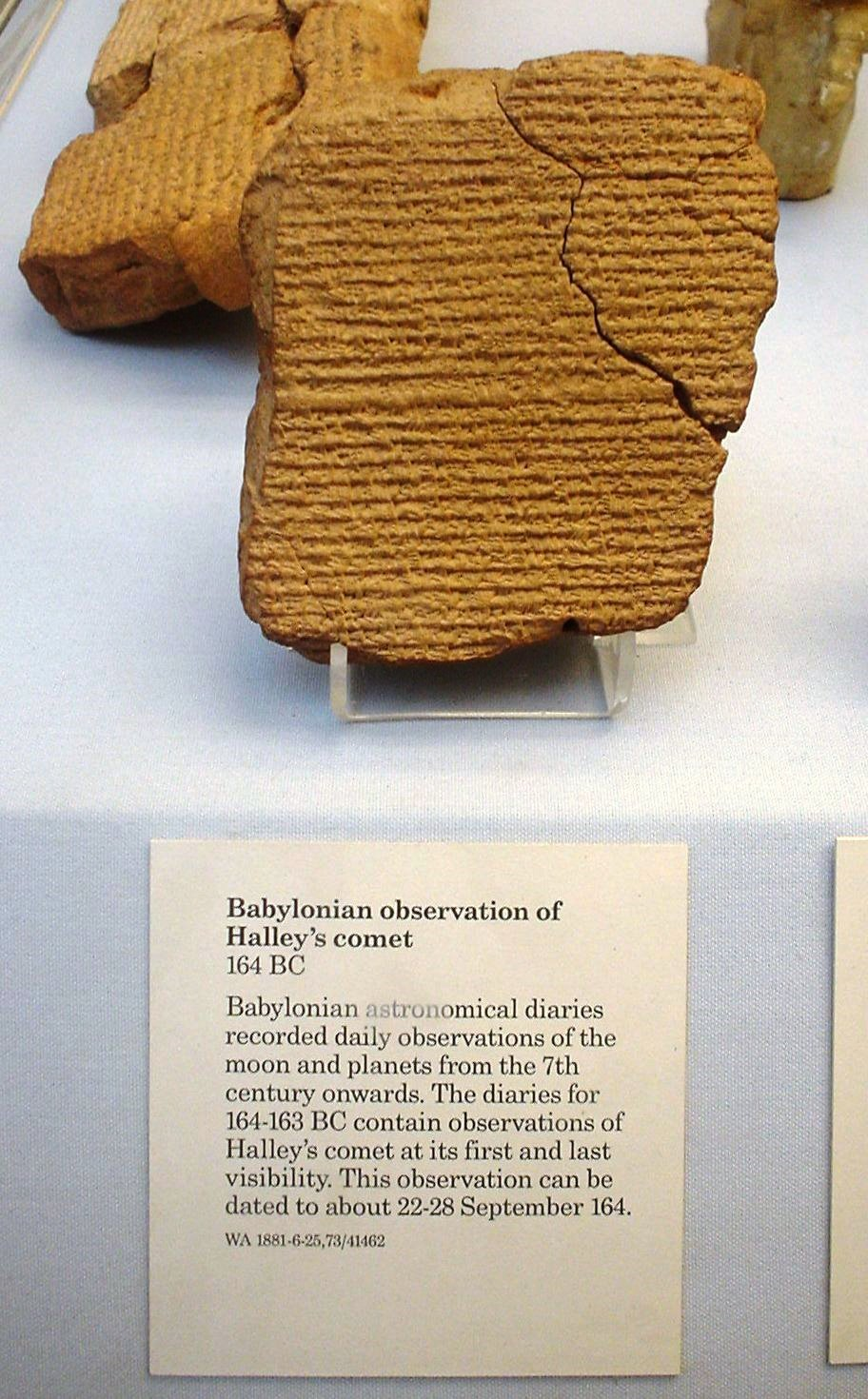
Babylonian tablet recording Halley's Comet in 164 BC

The oldest Babylonian catalogues of stars and constellations date back to the beginning of the Middle Bronze Age, most notably the Three Stars Each texts and the MUL.APIN, an expanded and revised version based on more accurate observation from around 1000 BC. However, the numerous Sumerian names in these catalogues suggest that they built on older, but otherwise unattested, Sumerian traditions of the Early Bronze Age.

The classical Zodiac is a revision of Neo-Babylonian constellations from the 6th century BC. The Greeks adopted the Babylonian constellations in the 4th century BC. Twenty Ptolemaic constellations are from the Ancient Near East. Another ten have the same stars but different names.

Biblical scholar E. W. Bullinger interpreted some of the creatures mentioned in the books of Ezekiel and Revelation as the middle signs of the four-quarters of the Zodiac, with the Lion as Leo, the Bull as Taurus, the Man representing Aquarius, and the Eagle standing in for Scorpio. The biblical Book of Job also makes reference to a number of constellations, including עיש 'Ayish "bier", כסיל chesil "fool" and כימה chimah "heap" (Job 9:9, 38:31–32), rendered as "Arcturus, Orion and Pleiades" by the KJV, but 'Ayish "the bier" actually corresponding to Ursa Major. The term Mazzaroth מַזָּרוֹת, translated as a garland of crowns, is a hapax legomenon in Job 38:32, and it might refer to the zodiacal constellations.

=== Classical antiquity ===
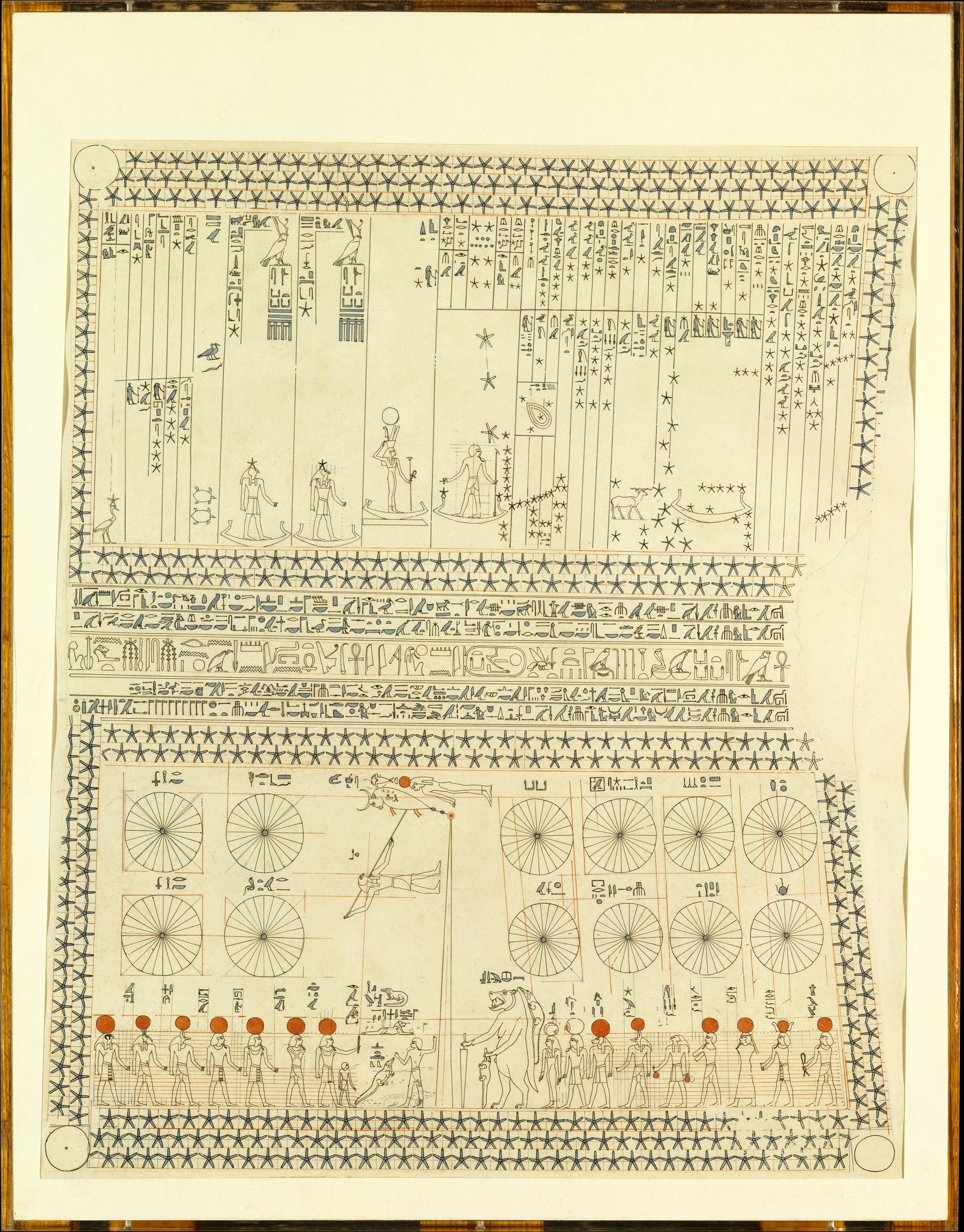
Egyptian star chart and decanal clock, from the ceiling of Senenmut's tomb, c. 1473 BC

There is only limited information on ancient Greek constellations, with some fragmentary evidence being found in the Works and Days of the Greek poet Hesiod, who mentioned the "heavenly bodies". Greek astronomy essentially adopted the older Babylonian system in the Hellenistic era, first introduced to Greece by Eudoxus of Cnidus in the 4th century BC. The original work of Eudoxus is lost, but it survives as a versification by Aratus, dating to the 3rd century BC. The most complete existing works dealing with the mythical origins of the constellations are by the Hellenistic writer termed pseudo-Eratosthenes and an early Roman writer styled pseudo-Hyginus. The basis of Western astronomy as taught during Late Antiquity and until the Early Modern period is the Almagest by Ptolemy, written in the 2nd century.

In the Ptolemaic Kingdom, native Egyptian tradition of anthropomorphic figures represented the planets, stars, and various constellations. Some of these were combined with Greek and Babylonian astronomical systems culminating in the Zodiac of Dendera, the oldest known depiction of the zodiac showing all the now familiar constellations, along with some original Egyptian constellations, decans, and planets. It remains unclear when this occurred, but most were placed during the Roman period between 2nd to 4th centuries AD. Ptolemy's Almagest remained the standard definition of constellations in the medieval period both in Europe and in Islamic astronomy.

=== Ancient China ===
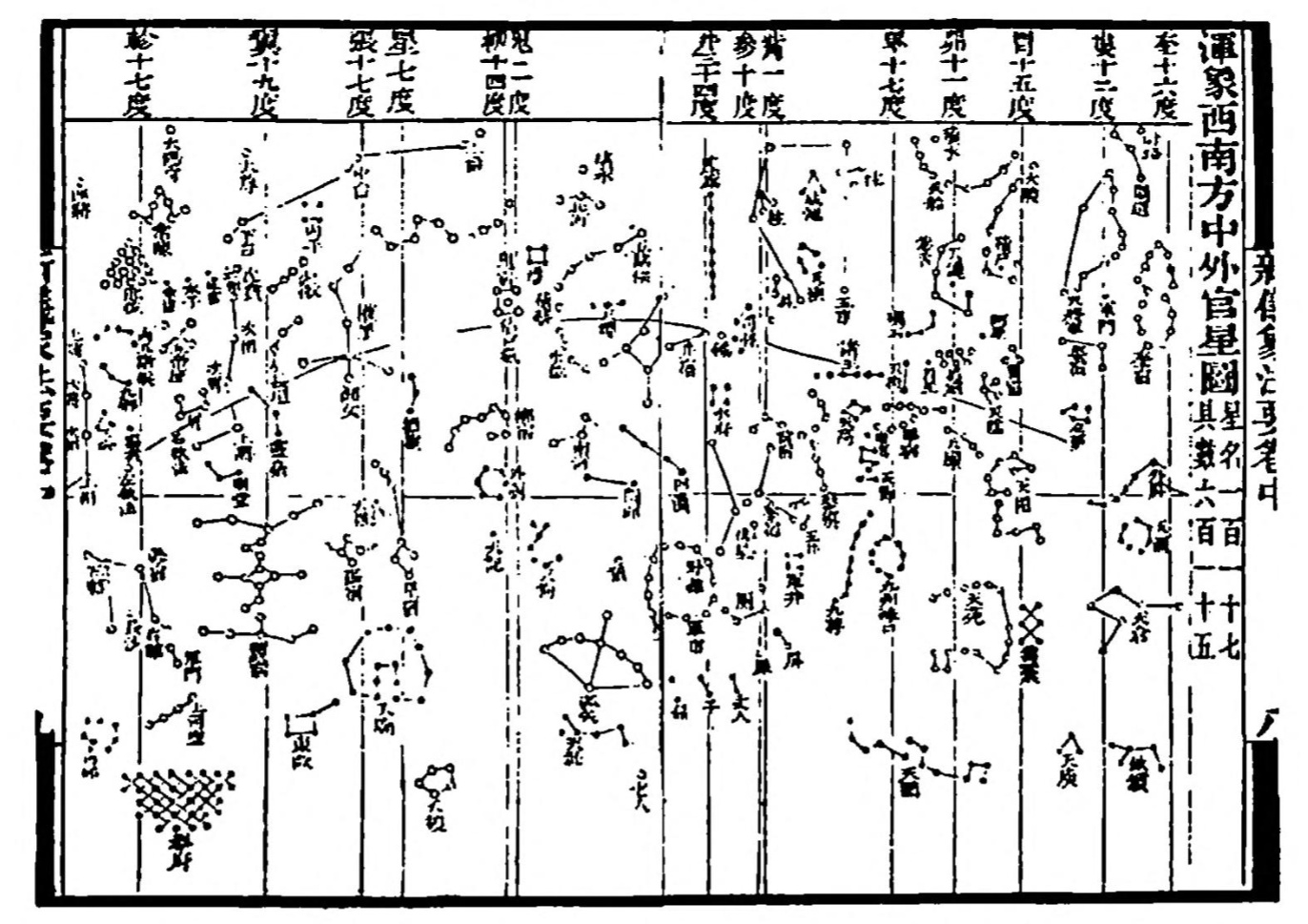
Chinese star map with a cylindrical projection (Su Song)

Ancient China had a long tradition of observing celestial phenomena. Nonspecific Chinese star names, later categorized in the Twenty-Eight Mansions, have been found on oracle bones from Anyang, dating back to the middle Shang dynasty. Chinese constellations are among the most significant observations of the Chinese sky, dating back to the 5th century BCE. The Chinese system developed independently from the Greco-Roman system, although there may have been earlier mutual influence, suggested by parallels to ancient Babylonian astronomy.

Three schools of classical Chinese astronomy in the Han period are attributed to astronomers of the earlier Warring States period. The constellations of the three schools were conflated into a single system by Chen Zhuo, an astronomer of the 3rd century, the Three Kingdoms period. Chen Zhuo's work has been lost, but information on his system of constellations survives in Tang dynasty records, notably by Gautama Siddha in his Nine Seizers Canon (Chinese: 九執曆; pinyin: Jiǔzhí-lì), an Indo-Chinese resident of Chang'an. The oldest extant Chinese star chart dates to that period and was preserved as part of the Dunhuang manuscripts. Native Chinese astronomy flourished during the Song dynasty, and during the Yuan dynasty and the subsequent Ming dynasty became increasingly influenced by other eastern and western astronomers of the medieval era: see Treatise on Astrology of the Kaiyuan Era. As maps were prepared during this period on more scientific lines, they were considered as more reliable.

A well-known map from the Song period is the Suzhou Astronomical Chart, which was prepared with carvings of stars on the planisphere of the Chinese sky on a stone plate; it is done accurately based on observations, and it shows the 1054 supernova in Taurus.

Influenced by European astronomy during the late Ming dynasty, charts depicted more stars but retained the traditional constellations. Newly observed stars were incorporated as supplementary to old constellations in the southern sky, which did not depict the traditional stars recorded by ancient Chinese astronomers. Further improvements were made during the later part of the Ming dynasty by Xu Guangqi and Johann Adam Schall von Bell, the German Jesuit and were recorded in Chongzhen Lishu (Calendrical Treatise of Chongzhen period, 1628). Traditional Chinese star maps incorporated 23 new constellations with 125 stars of the southern hemisphere of the sky based on the knowledge of Western star charts; with this improvement, the Chinese sky was integrated with world astronomy.

== Early modern astronomy ==
Historically, the origins of the constellations of the northern and southern skies are distinctly different. Most northern constellations date to antiquity, with names based mostly on Classical Greek legends. Evidence of these constellations has survived in the form of star charts, whose oldest representation appears on the statue known as the Farnese Atlas, based perhaps on the star catalogue of the Greek astronomer Hipparchus. Southern constellations are more modern inventions, sometimes as substitutes for ancient constellations (e.g. Argo Navis). Some southern constellations had long names that were shortened to more usable forms; e.g. Musca Australis became simply Musca.

Some of the early constellations were never universally adopted. Stars were often grouped into constellations differently by different observers, and the arbitrary constellation boundaries often led to confusion as to which constellation a celestial object belonged. Before astronomers delineated precise boundaries (starting in the 19th century), constellations generally appeared as ill-defined regions of the sky. Today they now follow officially accepted designated lines of right ascension and declination based on those defined by Benjamin Gould in Equinox B1875.0 in his star catalogue Uranometria Argentina.

The 1603 star atlas "Uranometria" of Johann Bayer assigned stars to individual constellations and formalized the division by assigning a series of Greek and Latin letters to the stars within each constellation. These are known today as Bayer designations. Subsequent star atlases led to the development of today's accepted modern constellations.

Several modern proposals have not survived. The French astronomers Pierre Lemonnier and Joseph Lalande, for example, proposed constellations that were once popular but have since been dropped. The northern constellation Quadrans Muralis survived into the 19th century (when its name was attached to the Quadrantid meteor shower), but is now divided between Boötes and Draco.

=== Origin of the southern constellations ===
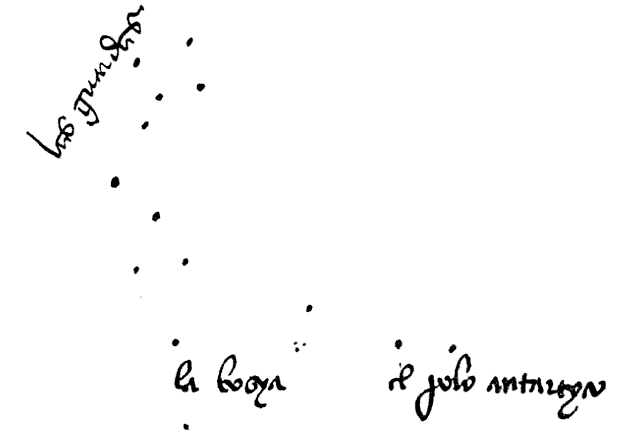
Sketch of the southern celestial sky by Portuguese astronomer João Faras (1 May 1500)

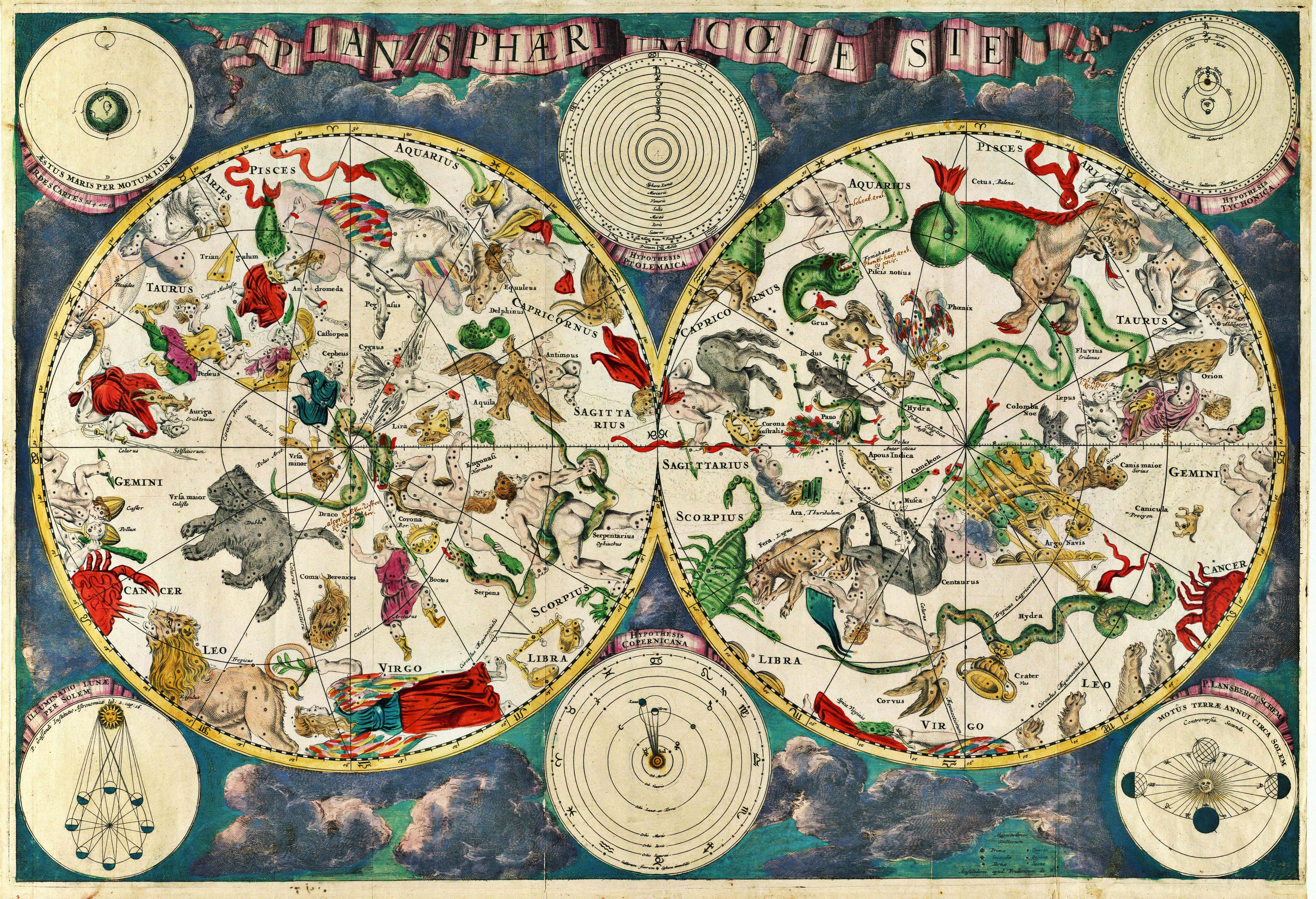
A celestial map from the Golden Age of Netherlandish cartography, by the Dutch cartographer Frederik de Wit

The southern sky, below about −65° declination, was only partially catalogued by ancient Babylonians, Egyptians, Greeks, Chinese, and Persian astronomers of the north. The knowledge that northern and southern star patterns differed goes back to Classical writers, who describe, for example, the African circumnavigation expedition commissioned by Egyptian Pharaoh Necho II in c. 600 BC and those of Hanno the Navigator in c. 500 BC.

The history of southern constellations is not straightforward. Different groupings and different names were proposed by various observers, some reflecting national traditions or designed to promote various sponsors. Southern constellations were important from the 14th to 16th centuries, when sailors used the stars for celestial navigation. Italian explorers who recorded new southern constellations include Andrea Corsali, Antonio Pigafetta, and Amerigo Vespucci.

Many of the 88 IAU-recognized constellations in this region first appeared on celestial globes introduced in the late 16th century by Petrus Plancius, based mainly on observations of the Dutch navigators Pieter Dirkszoon Keyser and Frederick de Houtman. These became widely known through Johann Bayer's star atlas Uranometria of 1603. Fourteen more were created in 1752 by the French astronomer Nicolas Louis de Lacaille, who also split the ancient constellation Argo Navis into three; these new figures appeared in his star catalogue, published in 1756.

=== 88 modern constellations ===
A list of 88 constellations was produced for the IAU in 1922. It is roughly based on the traditional Greek constellations listed by Ptolemy in his Almagest in the 2nd century and Aratus' work Phenomena, with early modern modifications and additions (most importantly introducing constellations covering the parts of the southern sky unknown to Ptolemy) by Petrus Plancius (1592, 1597/98 and 1613), Johannes Hevelius (1690) and Nicolas Louis de Lacaille (1763), who introduced fourteen new constellations. Lacaille studied the stars of the southern hemisphere from 1751 until 1752 from the Cape of Good Hope, when he was said to have observed more than 10,000 stars using a refracting telescope with an aperture of 0.5 inches (13 mm).

In 1922, Henry Norris Russell produced a list of 88 constellations with three-letter abbreviations for them. However, these constellations did not have clear borders between them. In 1928, the IAU formally accepted the 88 modern constellations, with contiguous boundaries along vertical and horizontal lines of right ascension and declination developed by Eugene Delporte that, together, cover the entire celestial sphere; this list was finally published in 1930. Where possible, these modern constellations usually share the names of their Graeco-Roman predecessors, such as Orion, Leo, or Scorpius. The aim of this system is area-mapping, i.e. the division of the celestial sphere into contiguous fields. Of the 88 modern constellations, 36 lie predominantly in the northern sky, and the other 52 predominantly in the southern.

Equirectangular plot of the 88 IAU designated constellations, those of the zodiac outlined

The boundaries developed by Delporte used data that originated back to epoch B1875.0, which was when Benjamin A. Gould first made his proposal to designate boundaries for the celestial sphere, a suggestion on which Delporte based his work. The consequence of this early date is that because of the precession of the equinoxes, the borders on a modern star map, such as epoch J2000, are already somewhat skewed and no longer perfectly vertical or horizontal. This effect will increase over the years and centuries to come.

=== Symbols ===
The constellations have no official symbols, though those of the ecliptic may take the signs of the zodiac. Symbols for the other modern constellations, as well as older ones that still occur in modern nomenclature, have occasionally been published.

== Dark cloud constellations ==
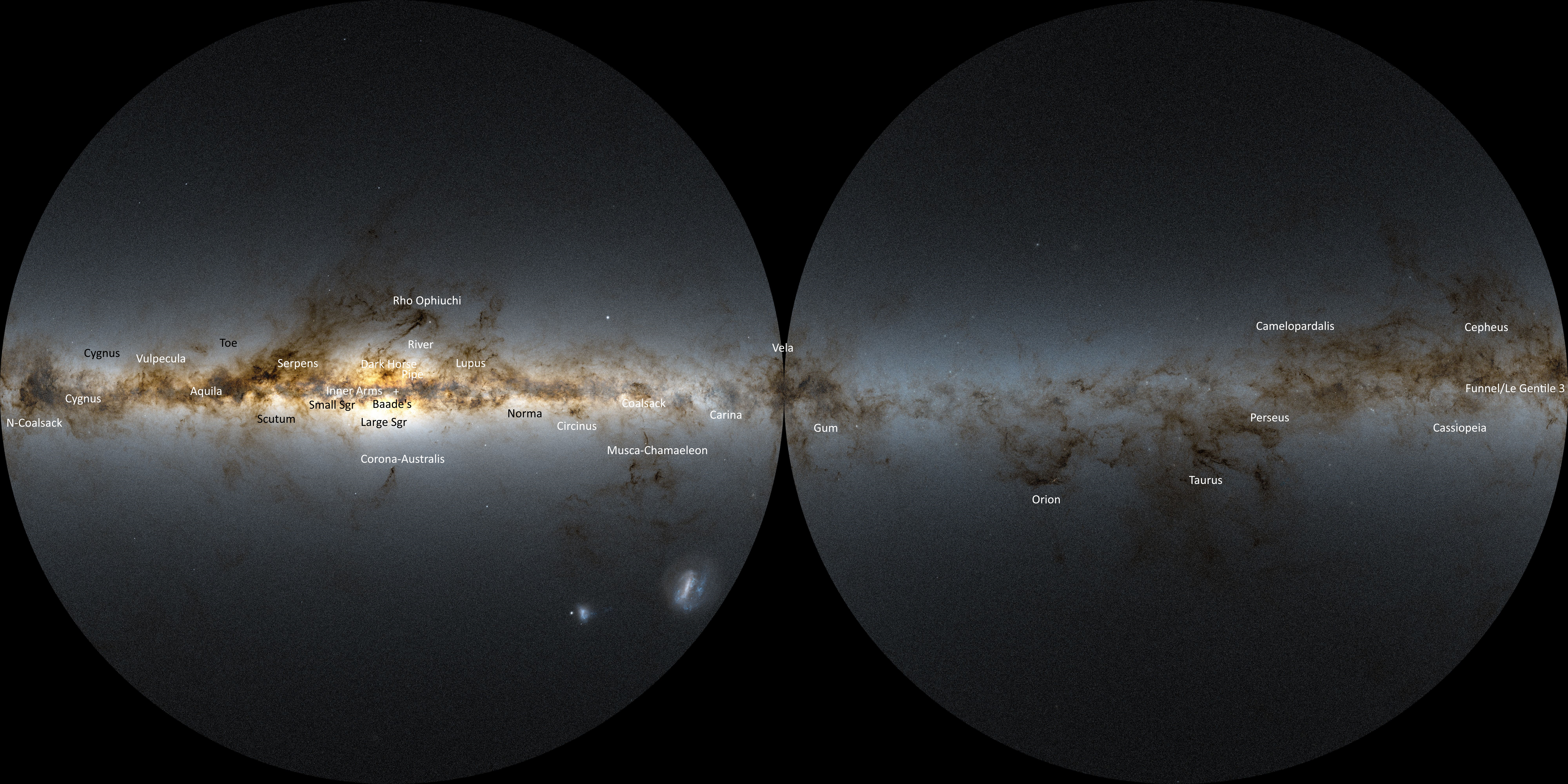
The Milky Way as seen from Earth, with prominent dark features labeled in white, as well as prominent star clouds labeled in black. Below center left are the Large and Small Magellanic Clouds. The star-like objects are globular clusters of the Milky Way.

The Great Rift, a series of dark patches in the Milky Way, is most visible in the southern sky. Some cultures have discerned shapes in these patches. Members of the Inca civilization identified various dark areas or dark nebulae in the Milky Way as animals and associated their appearance with the seasonal rains. Australian Aboriginal astronomy also describes dark cloud constellations, the most famous being the "emu in the sky" whose head is formed by the Coalsack, a dark nebula, instead of the stars.

The Emu in the sky – a constellation defined by dark clouds rather than by stars. The head of the emu is the Coalsack with Crux directly above. Scorpius is to the left.

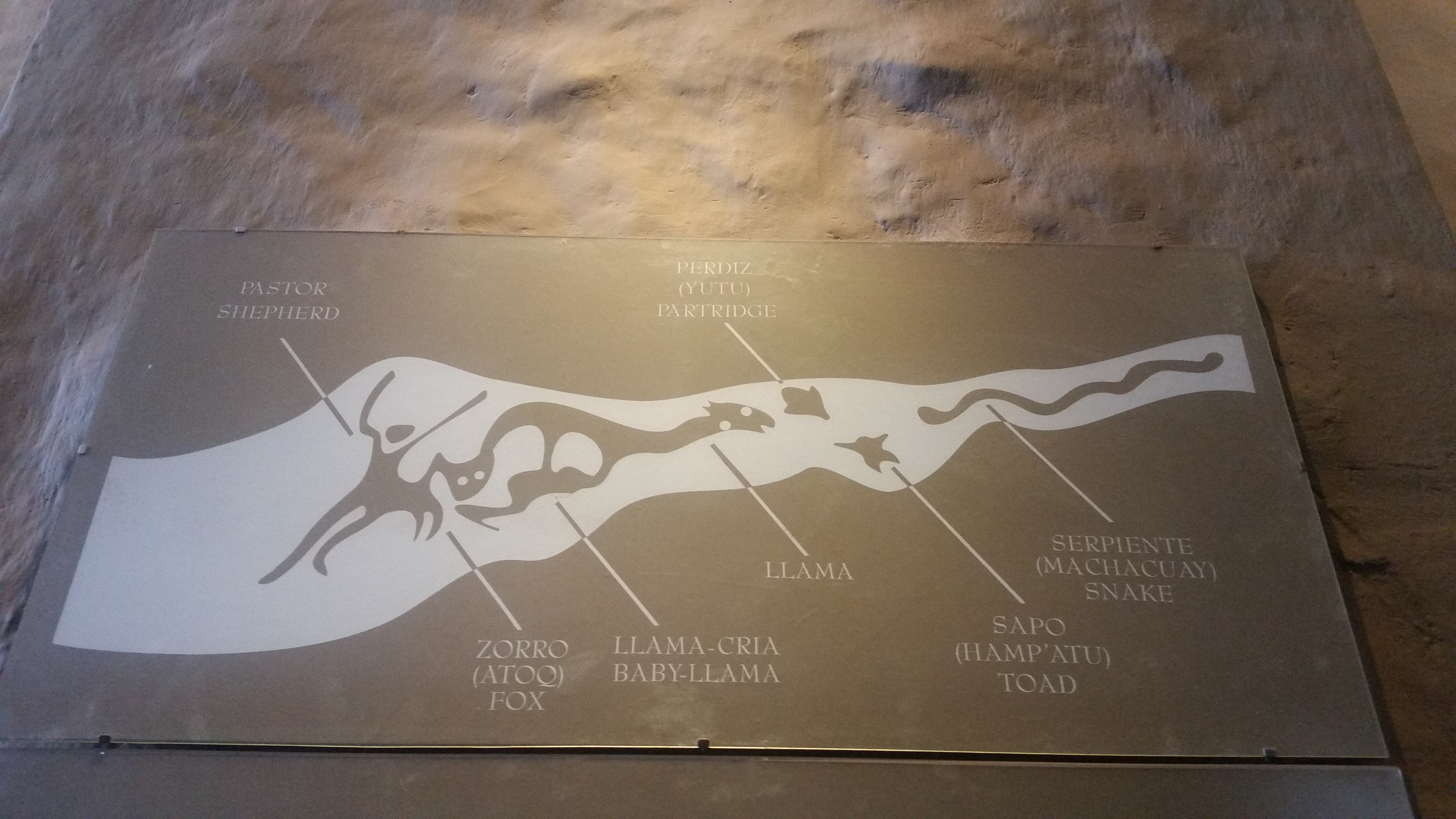
Inca dark cloud constellations in the Mayu (Celestial River), or the Milky Way; Crux is above Yutu, while the eyes of the Llama are Alpha and Beta Centauri.

=== List of dark cloud constellations ===
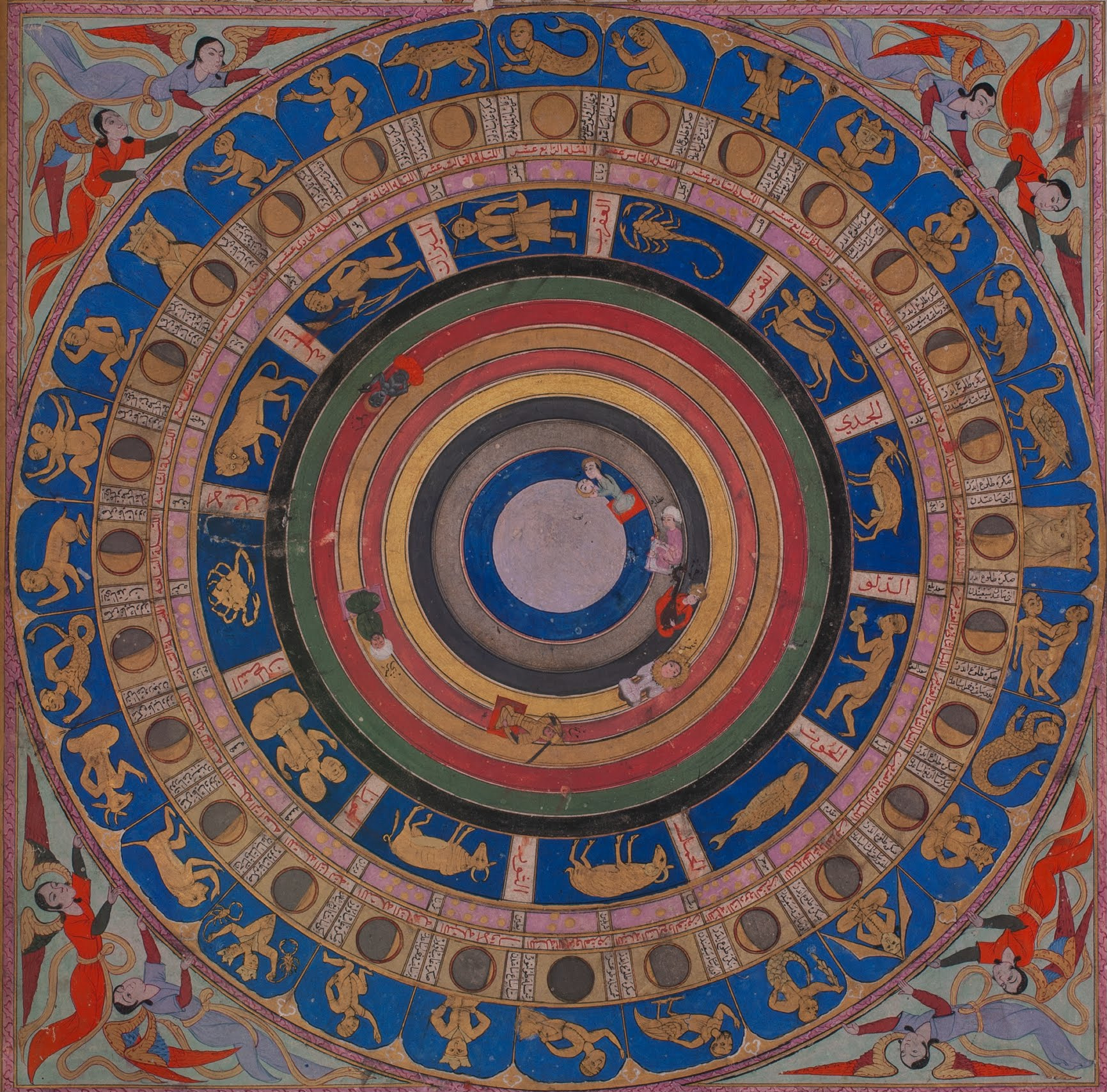
Ottoman period cosmographical map, with spheres of the planets, signs of the Zodiac and lunar mansions (Zubdat al-Tawarikh)

- Great Rift (astronomy)
  - Cygnus Rift
  - Serpens–Aquila Rift
  - Dark Horse (astronomy)
  - Rho Ophiuchi cloud complex
  - Emu in the sky

== See also ==
- IAU designated constellations – a list of the current, or "modern", constellations
- Celestial cartography
- Constellation family
- Former constellations
- Lists of stars by constellation
- Lists of constellations - historical and cultural lists
