= Andrea Corsali =

Italian explorer

Andrea Corsali (1487—?) was an Italian explorer who worked in the service of Giuliano di Lorenzo de' Medici of Florence and Lorenzo II de' Medici, duke of Urbino. Corsali traveled to Asia and the south seas aboard a Portuguese merchant vessel, sending home written accounts of the lands and peoples which he encountered along the way. Two of Corsali’s letters from the 'East Indies' were published in Florence in 1518, and again in Giovanni Battista Ramusio, Delle navigationi et viaggi (Venice, 1550), along with accounts by other travelers and merchants such as Giovanni da Empoli (1483-1518). He also noted that Sumatra and Ceylon (Sri Lanka) are two distinct islands (ancient geography confused them with the name of Taprobane). Corsali’s death date is unknown.

Corsali is known in Italy for having identified New Guinea, previously unknown to the Italians, and for having hypothesized the existence of Australia, although he never disembarked there himself.

On a voyage in 1516 from Lisbon to India, Corsali was the first European to describe, locate and illustrate the asterism of five stars now known as the Southern Cross (Crux).
