= Uranometria =

1603 star atlas produced by Johann Bayer

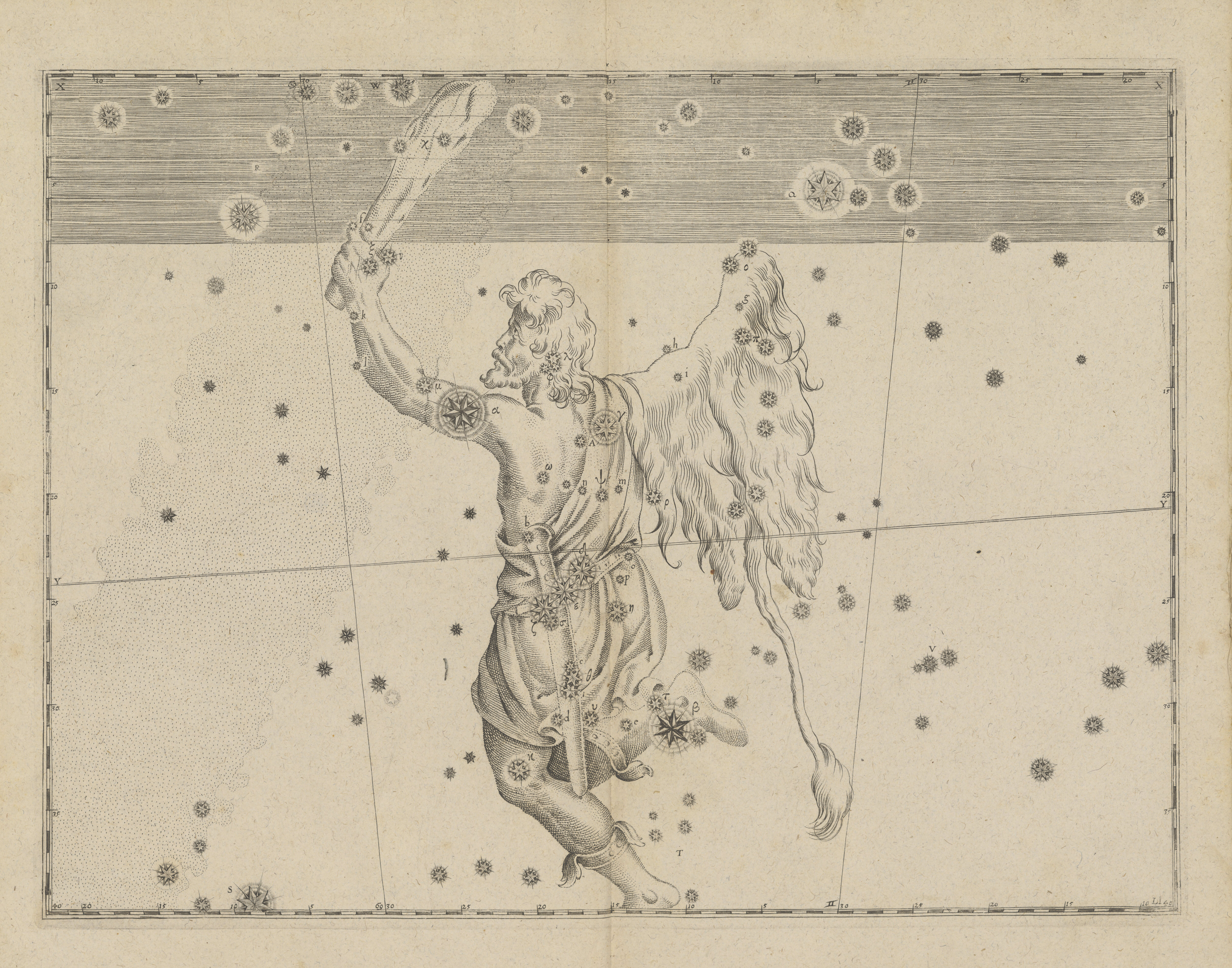
Uranometria's page of the constellation Orion

Uranometria is a star atlas produced by Johann Bayer. It was published in Augsburg in 1603 by Christoph Mang (Christophorus Mangus) under the full title Uranometria: omnium asterismorum continens schemata, nova methodo delineata, aereis laminis expressa (from Latin: Uranometria, containing charts of all the constellations, drawn by a new method and engraved on copper plates). The word "uranometria", from Ancient Greek οὐρανός (ouranós) 'sky, heavens' and μέτρον (metron) 'measure', literally translates to "measuring the heavens".

It was the first atlas to cover the entire celestial sphere.

== Charts ==
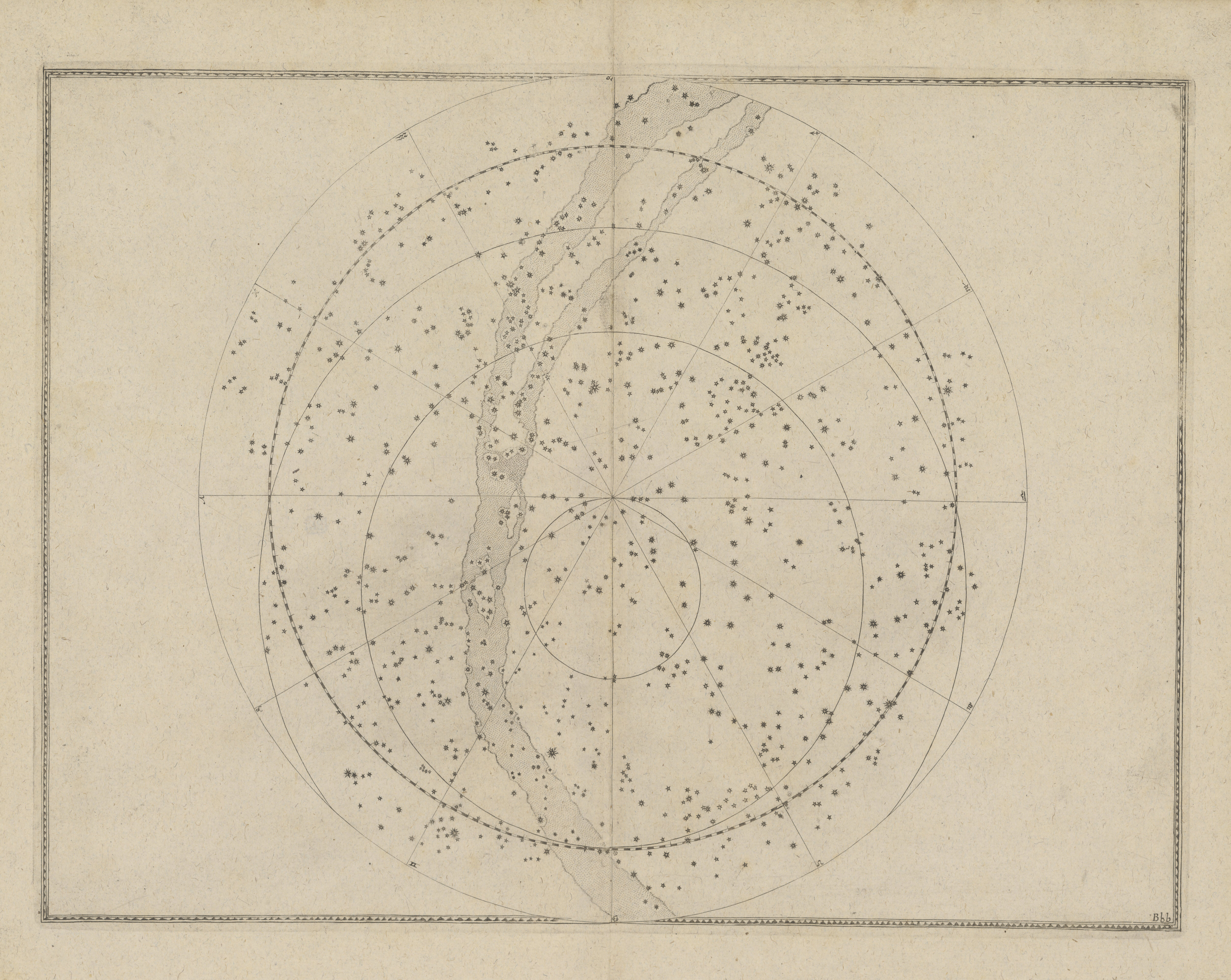
The Northern Hemisphere page from Johann Bayer's 1661 edition of Uranometria - the first atlas to have star charts covering the entire celestial sphere

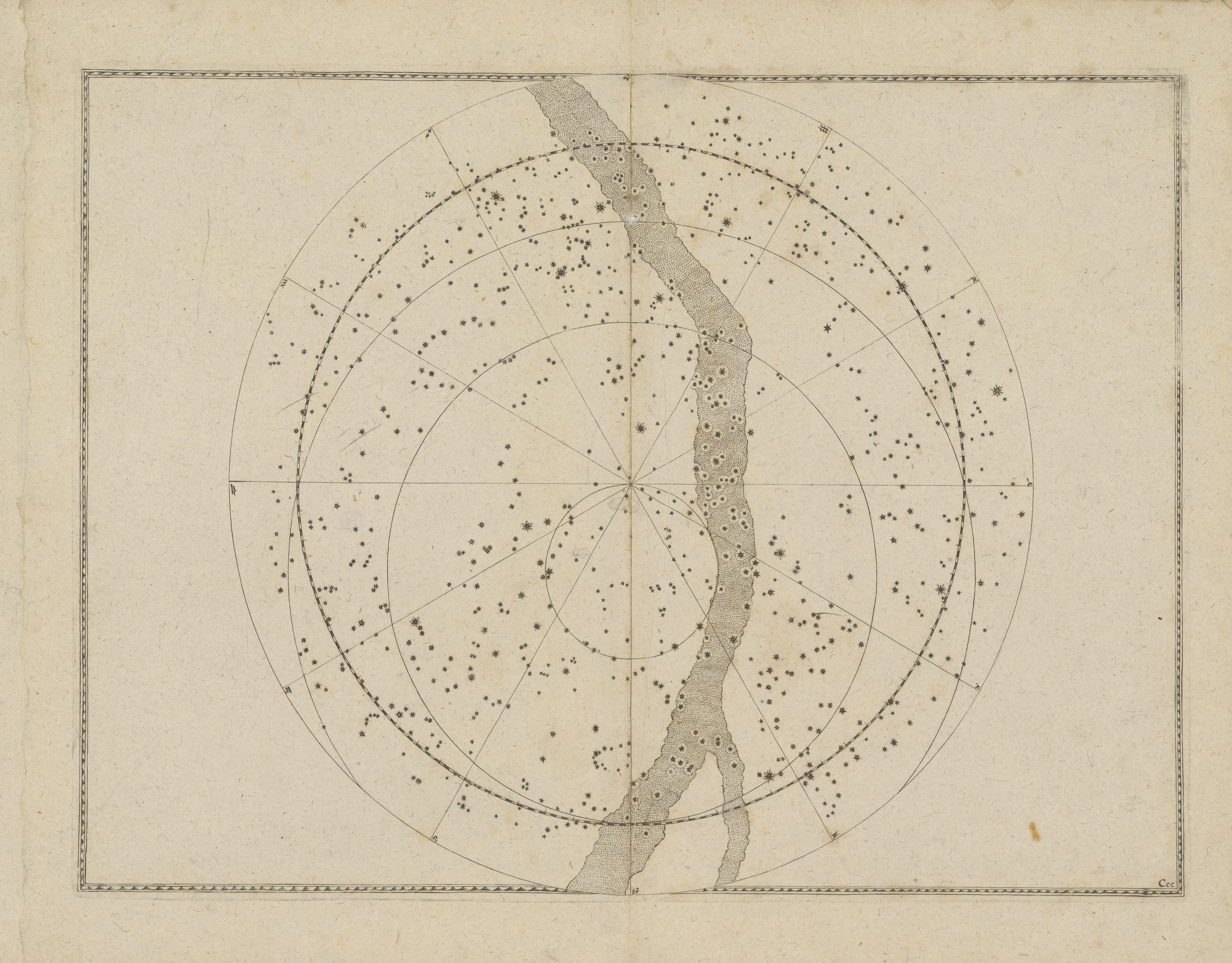
Southern Hemisphere

Uranometria contains 51 star charts, engraved on copper plates by Alexander Mair (c. 1562–1617). The first 48 charts illustrate each of the 48 Ptolemaic constellations. The 49th chart introduces 12 new constellations in the deep southern sky, which was unknown to Ptolemy. The final two charts are planispheres labeled "Synopsis coeli superioris borea" and "Synopsis coeli inferioris austrina", or (roughly), "Overview of the northern celestial hemisphere" and "Overview of the southern celestial hemisphere".

Each plate includes a grid for accurately determining the position of each star to fractions of a degree. The positions used by Bayer to create the Uranometria were taken from the expanded 1,005-star catalog of Tycho Brahe. Brahe's expanded list had circulated in manuscript since 1598 and was available in graphic form on the celestial globes of Petrus Plancius, Hondius, and Willem Blaeu. It was first published in tabular form in Johannes Kepler's Rudolphine Tables of 1627.

Uranometria introduced the convention of labelling stars by Greek and Latin letters, known as Bayer designations, a system still in use today.

The use of Brahe's catalog allowed for considerably better accuracy than Ptolemy's somewhat limited star listing. The stars listed in Uranometria total over 1,200, indicating that Brahe's catalog was not the only source of information used. Bayer took the southern star positions and constellation names for the 49th plate from the catalog of Dutch navigator Pieter Dirkszoon Keyser, who corrected the older observations of Amerigo Vespucci and Andrea Corsali, as well as the report of Pedro de Medina. Uranometria contains many more stars than did any previous star atlas, though the exact number is disputed as not all stars on the charts are labeled.

The stars of each constellation are shown overlain on an engraved image of the subject of the constellation. Convention imagined the human figures facing the Earth, so that previous celestial maps, oriented as though the viewer were looking down upon the celestial sphere from the outside, showed the figures from behind. For many of the human figures, Mair retained this convention of illustrating the figure from behind—but Bayer's projection showed stars as seen from the Earth looking up. Thus, the orientation appears in mirror reflection from Ptolemy's description, leading to some confusion in the literal meanings of certain star names: names referring to the "right shoulder" and the like are incorrect from the perspective of some of Uranometria's illustrations.

== Star catalogue ==
In the first edition of Uranometria a table of stars was printed on the back of each plate. This made it difficult to consult the table while looking at the chart. Worse still, the lettering of the table showed through the page and spoiled the chart. All later editions of the Uranometria omitted the tables, which were instead printed in a separate catalogue called Explicatio characterum aeneis Uranometrias. This separate catalogue was marred by numerous typographical errors which became worse with subsequent editions.

== Title page engraving ==
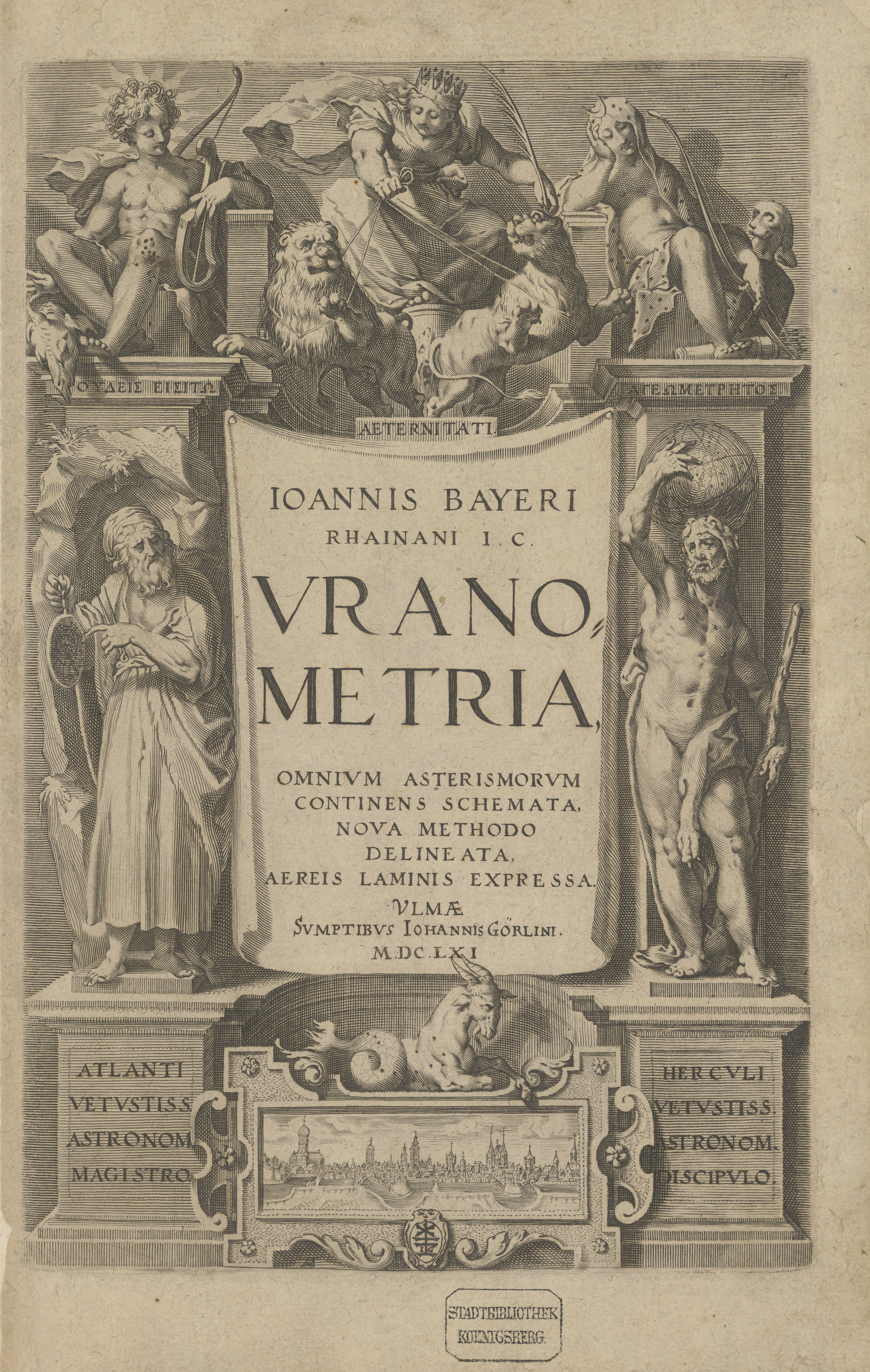
The title page

The engraved title page of Uranometria is signed in the shadows of the central scroll at the bottom with the monogram AMF, for "Alexander Mair fecit", and the date MDCIII. It features an architectural motif with the full title in the center. On pedestals to either side stand figures of Atlas and Hercules. Inscriptions in the pedestals read, "Atlanti uetustiss astronom magistro" ("Atlas the earliest teacher of astronomy") and "Herculi uetustiss astronom discipulo" ("Hercules the earliest student of astronomy"). Across the top of the title page are engraved several additional figures. In the upper left is Apollo, personifying the sun. Top center is the Earth goddess Cybele with a crown of stars and two lions on leashes. Upper right is Diana, personifying the Moon, with a cape of stars. Under Apollo is inscribed "ΟΥΔΕΙΣ ΕΙΣΙΤΩ" (Oudis isíto) and under Diana is inscribed "ΑΓΕΟΜΕΤΡΗΤΟΣ" (ageométritos). "Ουδεις αγεωμέτρητος εισίτω" (Oudis ageométritos isíto) i.e. "Let no one ignorant of geometry enter" was supposedly inscribed at the entrance to Plato's Academy. Beneath the title banner is a figure of Capricorn and beneath that a view of Augsburg.

== See also ==
- Bayer objects
- Celestial cartography
- Coelum Stellatum Christianum
- Star catalogue
- Grand Central Terminal art § Ceiling, ceiling mural created from Uranometria drawings
