= Johann Bayer =

German lawyer and uranographer

- Born: 1572; Rain, Duchy of Bavaria, Holy Roman Empire
- Died: 7 March 1625 (aged 52–53); Augsburg, Electorate of Bavaria, Holy Roman Empire
- Education: University of Ingolstadt
- Known for: Uranometria
- Scientific career
- Fields: Jurisprudence, astronomy

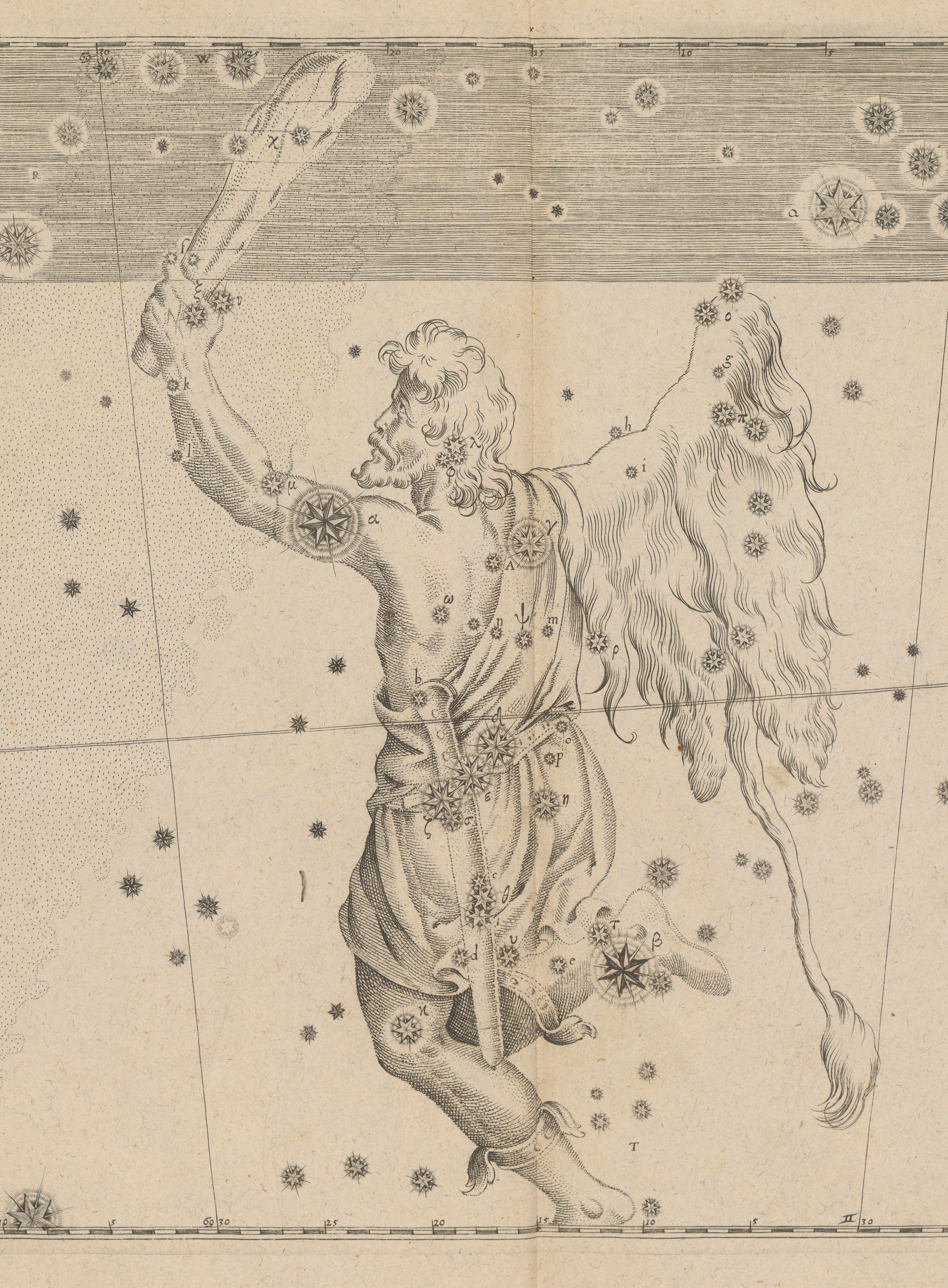
The constellation Orion in Bayer's Uranometria

Johann Bayer (German pronunciation: [ˈjoːhan ˈbaɪɐ]; 1572 – 7 March 1625) was a German lawyer and uranographer (celestial cartographer). He was born in Rain in 1572. In 1592, aged 20, he began his study of philosophy and law at the University of Ingolstadt, after which he moved to Augsburg to begin work as a lawyer, becoming legal adviser to the city council in 1612.

Bayer had several interests outside his work, including archaeology and mathematics. However, he is primarily known for his work in astronomy; particularly for his work on determining the positions of objects on the celestial sphere. He remained unmarried and died in 1625.

Bayer's star atlas Uranometria Omnium Asterismorum ("Uranometry of all the asterisms") was first published in 1603 in Augsburg and dedicated to two prominent local citizens. This was the first atlas to cover the entire celestial sphere. It was based upon the work of Tycho Brahe and may have borrowed from Alessandro Piccolomini's 1540 star atlas, De le stelle fisse ("Of the fixed stars"), although Bayer included an additional 1,000 stars. The Uranometria, published in China too, introduced a new system of star designation which has become known as the Bayer designation. Bayer's atlas included twelve new constellations invented a few years earlier to fill in the far south of the night sky, which was unknown to ancient Greece and Rome.

The crater Bayer on the Moon is named after him.

== Works ==
- Bayer, Johann (1603). Uranometria (in Latin). Augsburg: Christoph Mang. doi:10.3931/e-rara-309.

== See also ==
- Julius Schiller
- Bayer designation
