= List of stars in Volans =

This is the list of notable stars in the constellation Volans, sorted by decreasing brightness.

Name	B	G.	Var	HD	HIP	RA	Dec	vis. mag.	abs. mag.	Dist. (ly)	Sp. class	Notes
γ^{2} Vol	γ^{2}	9		55865	34481	07^{h} 08^{m} 44.82^{s}	−70° 29′ 57.1″	3.62	0.59	142	G8IIIvar	double star with γ^{1} Vol; suspected variable, V_{max} = 3.56^{m}, V_{min} = 3.62^{m}
β Vol	β	29		71878	41312	08^{h} 25^{m} 44.25^{s}	−66° 08′ 11.5″	3.77	1.17	108	K2IIIvar	suspected variable, V_{max} = 3.76^{m}, V_{min} = 3.79^{m}
ζ Vol	ζ	16		63295	37504	07^{h} 41^{m} 49.20^{s}	−72° 36′ 22.1″	3.93	0.86	134	K0III	
δ Vol	δ	10		57623	35228	07^{h} 16^{m} 49.83^{s}	−67° 57′ 25.8″	3.97	−2.56	660	F6II	
α Vol	α	46		78045	44382	09^{h} 02^{m} 26.80^{s}	−66° 23′ 45.0″	4.00	1.09	124	A5Vm	
ε Vol	ε	22		68520	39794	08^{h} 07^{m} 55.84^{s}	−68° 37′ 01.7″	4.35	−2.12	560	B6IV	
24 G. Vol		24		70514	40680	08^{h} 18^{m} 18.78^{s}	−65° 36′ 47.7″	5.06	0.27	296	K1III	
6 G. Vol		6		53501	33682	06^{h} 59^{m} 50.58^{s}	−67° 55′ 01.2″	5.18	0.44	290	K3III	
θ Vol	θ	35		74405	42425	08^{h} 39^{m} 05.13^{s}	−70° 23′ 11.9″	5.19	0.86	239	A0V	
η Vol	η	27		71576	41003	08^{h} 22^{m} 04.52^{s}	−73° 24′ 00.2″	5.28	0.09	356	A0/A1IV/V	
κ^{1} Vol	κ^{1}	25		71046	40817	08^{h} 19^{m} 49.00^{s}	−71° 30′ 54.0″	5.33	−0.06	390	B9III/IV	part of the κ Vol triple star system
43 G. Vol		43		76143	43414	08^{h} 50^{m} 34.68^{s}	−66° 47′ 35.6″	5.34	1.74	171	F5IV	
ι Vol	ι	5		51557	32912	06^{h} 51^{m} 26.98^{s}	−70° 57′ 48.5″	5.41	−0.76	558	B7IV	
30 G. Vol		30		72337	41451	08^{h} 27^{m} 16.79^{s}	−70° 05′ 36.9″	5.51	0.80	285	A0V	
κ^{2} Vol	κ^{2}	26		71066	40834	08^{h} 20^{m} 00.56^{s}	−71° 30′ 19.7″	5.63	0.21	395	A0p	part of the κ Vol triple star system; suspected variable, ΔV = 0.03^{m}
γ^{1} Vol	γ^{1}	8		55864	34473	07^{h} 08^{m} 42.34^{s}	−70° 29′ 50.4″	5.68	2.41	147	F2	double star with γ^{2} Vol
19 G. Vol		19		64484	38210	07^{h} 49^{m} 41.00^{s}	−66° 11′ 45.5″	5.78	0.04	458	B9V	
45 G. Vol		45		77887	44283	09^{h} 01^{m} 08.49^{s}	−68° 41′ 02.1″	5.89	−0.95	762	M1III	slow irregular variable, ΔV = 0.012^{m}, P = 4.46488 d
28 G. Vol		28		71863	41321	08^{h} 25^{m} 51.62^{s}	−64° 36′ 02.4″	5.95	0.75	358	G8/K0III	
41 G. Vol		41		75171	42895	08^{h} 44^{m} 30.05^{s}	−65° 49′ 32.5″	6.03	2.12	198	A9V	
4 G. Vol		4		50002	32332	06^{h} 44^{m} 55.67^{s}	−70° 26′ 01.6″	6.10	−0.33	629	K3III	
44 G. Vol		44		76270	43351	08^{h} 49^{m} 50.14^{s}	−72° 33′ 04.5″	6.10	−3.84	3165	A3m...	suspected variable
33 G. Vol		33		73468	41907	08^{h} 32^{m} 41.88^{s}	−73° 21′ 25.1″	6.11	0.77	381	G8III	
18 G. Vol		18		63584	37720	07^{h} 44^{m} 13.10^{s}	−69° 49′ 17.8″	6.16	0.70	403	A0IV/V	
15 G. Vol		15		62153	36914	07^{h} 35^{m} 21.66^{s}	−74° 16′ 30.0″	6.33	−1.01	959	B9IV + B9IV	double star
20 G. Vol		20		66920	39041	07^{h} 59^{m} 15.78^{s}	−73° 14′ 38.8″	6.33	0.84	409	A3III	
40 G. Vol		40		75116	42850	08^{h} 43^{m} 54.33^{s}	−68° 12′ 41.9″	6.33	−1.21	1052	K3III:	
3 G. Vol		3		49947	32222	06^{h} 43^{m} 36.73^{s}	−73° 07′ 04.7″	6.36	0.81	420	G8III	
17 G. Vol		17		63513	37773	07^{h} 44^{m} 43.88^{s}	−66° 04′ 19.4″	6.37	−0.12	648	G6/G8III	
12 G. Vol		12		60150	36346	07^{h} 28^{m} 51.40^{s}	−64° 30′ 35.2″	6.38	−0.22	681	K5III	
7 G. Vol		7		55151	34270	07^{h} 06^{m} 14.30^{s}	−68° 50′ 15.3″	6.47	0.54	501	K0III	
11 G. Vol		11		59640	35946	07^{h} 24^{m} 37.11^{s}	−71° 28′ 14.7″	6.49	2.04	253	A3V	
2 G. Vol		2		49268	31977	06^{h} 40^{m} 57.56^{s}	−71° 46′ 30.3″	6.50	0.88	433	K1IIICN...	
13 G. Vol		13		61312	36735	07^{h} 33^{m} 21.80^{s}	−68° 46′ 06.69″	6.59	0.42	547	A1/2V	
1 G. Vol		1		49306	32106	06^{h} 42^{m} 25.55^{s}	−67° 50′ 35.16″	6.70	1.08	445	B9.5/A0V	
32 G. Vol		32		73391	41837	08^{h} 31^{m} 44.63^{s}	−74° 51′ 17.98″	6.71	0.61	688	K0/1III	suspected variable
21 G. Vol		21		67559	39406	08^{h} 03^{m} 21.16^{s}	−69° 58′ 17.66″	6.74	-0.42	961	B8III	
31 G. Vol		31		72719	41478	08^{h} 27^{m} 33.85^{s}	−75° 21′ 31.25″	6.81	1.58	357	A2V	
14 G. Vol		14		61950	37007	07^{h} 36^{m} 19.26^{s}	−69° 03′ 23.54″	6.87	-1.23	1343	B8V	
HD 76920				76920	43803	08^{h} 55^{m} 17.0^{s}	−67° 15′ 56″	7.8		603	K1III	has a planet (b)
HD 76700				76700	43686	08^{h} 53^{m} 55.52^{s}	−66° 48′ 03.6″	8.13	4.25	195	G6V	has a planet (b)
R Vol			R			07^{h} 05^{m} 36.21^{s}	−73° 00′ 52.02″	8.70	-0.91	2728	CVIIe+	Carbon star and Mira variable, V_{max} = 8.78^{m}, V_{min} = 11.50^{m}, P = 445.46 d
HD 68402				68402	39589	08^{h} 05^{m} 24.0^{s}	−74° 24′ 38″	9.11		254	G5IV/V	has a planet (b)
S Vol			S			07^{h} 29^{m} 45.57^{s}	−73° 22′ 43.97″	12.97	3.06	3130.7	M4IIIe	Mira variable, V_{max} = 8.96^{m}, V_{min} = 13.80^{m}, P = 395.84 d
L 97-12						07^{h} 53^{m} 08.15^{s}	−67° 47′ 31.38″	14.09		25.822	DA9.0	one of the closest known white dwarfs
RR Vol			RR			08^{h} 27^{m} 28.73^{s}	−69° 53′ 55.42″	15.93	2.78	12102.28	A9V	Algol variable
UY Vol			UY			07^{h} 48^{m} 33.30^{s}	−67° 45′ 00.0″	16.9	2.39	26,000	M	X-ray burster and eclipsing binary, V_{max} = 16.9^{m}, V_{min} = <23.0^{m}, P = 0.159 d
Table legend: • Name = Proper name • B = Bayer designation • F or/and G. = Flamsteed designation or Gould designation • Var = Variable star designation • HD = Henry Draper Catalogue designation number • HIP = Hipparcos Catalogue designation number • RA = Right ascension for the Epoch/Equinox J2000.0 • Dec = Declination for the Epoch/Equinox J2000.0 • vis. mag. = visual magnitude (m or m_{v}), also known as apparent magnitude • abs. mag. = absolute magnitude (M_{v}) • Dist. (ly) = Distance in light-years from Earth • Sp. class = Spectral class of the star in the stellar classification system • Notes = Common name(s) or alternate name(s); comments; notable properties [for example: multiple star status, range of variability if it is a variable star, exoplanets, etc.]

== See also ==
- List of stars by constellation
