= Volans in Chinese astronomy =

The modern constellation Volans is not included in the Three Enclosures and Twenty-Eight Mansions system of traditional Chinese uranography because its stars are too far south for observers in China to know about them prior to the introduction of Western star charts. Based on the work of Xu Guangqi and the German Jesuit missionary Johann Adam Schall von Bell in the late Ming Dynasty, this constellation has been classified as one of the 23 Southern Asterisms (近南極星區, Jìnnánjíxīngōu) under the name Flying Fish (飛魚, Fēiyú).

The name of the western constellation in modern Chinese is 飛魚座 (fēi yú zuò), which means "the flying fish constellation".

== Stars ==
The map of Chinese constellation in constellation Volans area consists of :

Four Symbols	Mansion (Chinese name)	Romanization	Translation	Asterisms (Chinese name)	Romanization	Translation	Western star name	Chinese star name	Romanization	Translation
-	近南極星區 (non-mansions)	Jìnnánjíxīngōu (non-mansions)	The Southern Asterisms (non-mansions)	飛魚	Fēiyú	Flying Fish				
-	近南極星區 (non-mansions)	Jìnnánjíxīngōu (non-mansions)	The Southern Asterisms (non-mansions)	飛魚	Fēiyú	Flying Fish	α Vol	飛魚一	Fēiyúyī	1st star
-	近南極星區 (non-mansions)	Jìnnánjíxīngōu (non-mansions)	The Southern Asterisms (non-mansions)	飛魚	Fēiyú	Flying Fish	γ Vol	飛魚二	Fēiyúèr	2nd star
-	近南極星區 (non-mansions)	Jìnnánjíxīngōu (non-mansions)	The Southern Asterisms (non-mansions)	飛魚	Fēiyú	Flying Fish	β Vol	飛魚三	Fēiyúsān	3rd star
-	近南極星區 (non-mansions)	Jìnnánjíxīngōu (non-mansions)	The Southern Asterisms (non-mansions)	飛魚	Fēiyú	Flying Fish	κ Vol	飛魚四	Fēiyúsì	4th star
-	近南極星區 (non-mansions)	Jìnnánjíxīngōu (non-mansions)	The Southern Asterisms (non-mansions)	飛魚	Fēiyú	Flying Fish	δ Vol	飛魚五	Fēiyúwu	5th star
-	近南極星區 (non-mansions)	Jìnnánjíxīngōu (non-mansions)	The Southern Asterisms (non-mansions)	飛魚	Fēiyú	Flying Fish	ζ Vol	飛魚六	Fēiyúliù	6th star

== See also ==
- Chinese astronomy
- Traditional Chinese star names
- Chinese constellations
