= NGC 2397 =

Galaxy in the constellation Volans

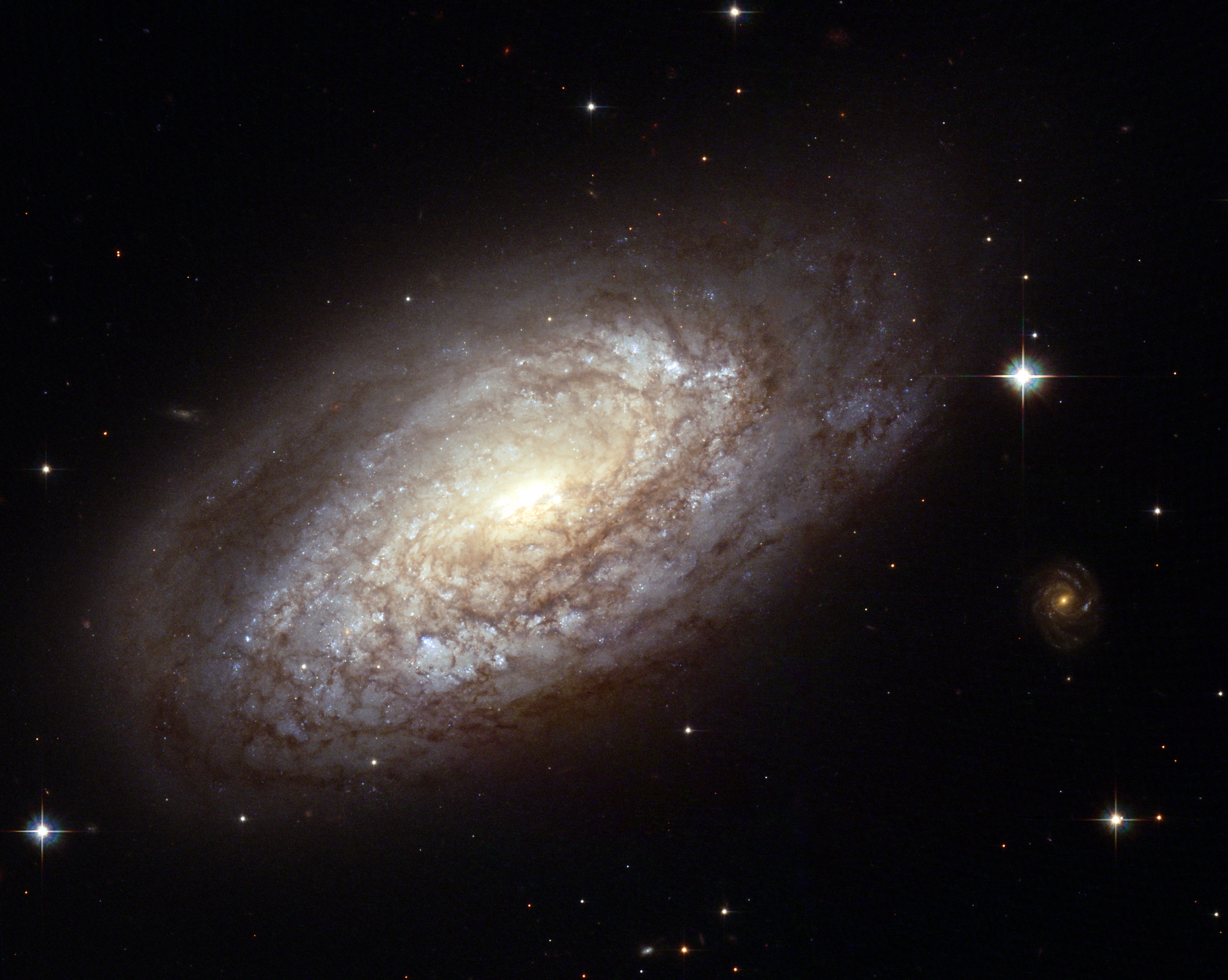
- NGC 2397 by HST; Credit: NASA, ESA & Stephen Smartt

Observation data (J2000 epoch)
- Constellation: Volans
- Right ascension: 07^{h} 21^{m} 19.89194^{s}
- Declination: −69° 00′ 05.0140″
- Redshift: 0.004546
- Heliocentric radial velocity: 1,357 km/s
- Distance: 69 Mly (21.18 Mpc)
- Group or cluster: NGC 2442
- Apparent magnitude (V): 12.68
- Absolute magnitude (B): −20.98

Characteristics
- Type: SB(s)b
- Apparent size (V): 1′.643 × 0′.887

Other designations
- NGC 2397, PGC 20766

NGC 2397 is a flocculent spiral galaxy located in the southern constellation Volans, about one degree to the SSE of Delta Volantis. English astronomer John Herschel discovered the galaxy on February 21, 1835. It is located at a distance of approximately 69 million light years from the Sun, and is a member of the small NGC 2442 group that includes NGC 2434. It is part of a galaxy group known as LGG 147. It has at least 5 confirmed members, NGC 2397, NGC 2434, NGC 2442, NGC 2443 and PGC 20690.

The morphological classification of NGC 2397 is SB(s)b, which indicates this is a barred spiral (SB) with no ring structure around the nucleus (s) and moderately tightly–wound spiral arms (b). The nucleus is partly obscured and consists of older yellow and red stars; more recent stars have formed within the outer blue spiral arms, which also feature protrusions of dust.

In March 2006, a star in the galaxy, SN 2006bc, was spotted in the late stages of supernova. Astronomers at Queen's University Belfast, who have been studying supernovas to find out what sort of stars explode, worked through previously captured images of the galaxy and found one of when the star exploded, one of only six ever collected. Early spectra indicated this was a type II supernova, possibly of sub-type II-L or II-P.
