= HD 71863 =

Star in the constellation Volans

Observation data Epoch J2000.0 Equinox ICRS
- Constellation: Volans
- Right ascension: 08^{h} 25^{m} 51.5958^{s}
- Declination: −64° 36′ 02.230″
- Apparent magnitude (V): 5.94±0.01

Characteristics
- Evolutionary stage: red giant branch
- Spectral type: G8/K0 III
- U−B color index: +0.73
- B−V color index: +0.92

Astrometry
Radial velocity (R_{v})	19.1±3.1 km/s
Proper motion (μ)	RA: −14.486 mas/yr Dec.: +14.924 mas/yr
Parallax (π)	7.9857±0.079 mas
Distance	408 ± 4 ly (125 ± 1 pc)
Absolute magnitude (M_{V})	+0.7

Details
Mass	2.65±0.18 M_{☉}
Radius	11.06±0.26 R_{☉}
Luminosity	69.6±1.8 L_{☉}
Surface gravity (log g)	2.75±0.10 cgs
Temperature	5,014±48 K
Metallicity [Fe/H]	0.02±0.04 dex
Rotational velocity (v sin i)	2.7±1.1 km/s

Other designations
- 28 G. Volantis, CD−64°328, CPD−64°878, GC 11564, HD 71863, HIP 41321, HR 3346, SAO 250226

Database references
SIMBAD	data

HD 71863 (HR 3346) is a solitary star in the southern circumpolar constellation Volans. It is faintly visible to the naked eye with an apparent magnitude of 5.94 and is located 408 light-years away based on parallax measurements. However, it is receding with a radial velocity of 19.1 km/s.

HD 71863 has a classification of G8/K0 III — intermediate between a G8 and K0 giant star. It has 2.65 times the mass of the Sun but has expanded to 11 times it's girth. It shines at 72 times the luminosity of the Sun and rotates slowly, with a projected rotational velocity of 2.7 km/s. With an effective temperature of 5,014 K, it has a yellowish-orange hue. HD 71863 metallicity – elements heavier than helium – is at solar level.

HD 71863 is located near a group of stars moving with a Carinae, but is just moving with them by coincidence, and has no relation to the group.
