= Iota Volantis =

B-type giant star in the constellation Volans

ι Volantis
- Location of ι Volantis

Observation data Epoch J2000.0 Equinox ICRS
- Constellation: Volans
- Right ascension: 06^{h} 51^{m} 26.98552^{s}
- Declination: −70° 57′ 48.2766″
- Apparent magnitude (V): 5.39

Characteristics
- Evolutionary stage: main sequence
- Spectral type: B7 III
- U−B color index: −0.37
- B−V color index: −0.12

Astrometry
Radial velocity (R_{v})	18.5 km/s
Proper motion (μ)	RA: +3.64 mas/yr Dec.: +26.08 mas/yr
Parallax (π)	5.79±0.19 mas
Distance	560 ± 20 ly (173 ± 6 pc)
Absolute magnitude (M_{V})	+0.14

Details
Mass	3.72±0.06 M_{☉}
Radius	4.7 R_{☉}
Luminosity	313 L_{☉}
Temperature	11,803 K
Rotational velocity (v sin i)	129 km/s
Age	236 Myr

Other designations
- ι Vol, CPD−70°572, FK5 267, HD 51557, HIP 32912, HR 2602, SAO 256344

Database references
SIMBAD	data

Iota Volantis, Latinized as ι Volantis, is a star in the southern constellation of Volans. It has an apparent visual magnitude of 5.39, which indicates it is faintly visible to the naked eye. With a parallax of 0.00579″, it lies at an estimated distance of roughly 560 light years from the Sun.

This star has a stellar classification of B7 III, which means it is a B-type giant star. However, some sources give it a classification of B7 IV, which would indicate it is a subgiant star. It has 3.7 times the mass of the Sun and is spinning rapidly with a projected rotational velocity of 129 km/s. The estimated size of the star is 4.7 times the radius of the Sun, and it shines with around 313 times the Sun's luminosity. The effective temperature of the star's outer atmosphere is 11,803 K, giving it the blue-white hue of a B-type star.
