= HD 73468 =

Star in the constellation Volcans

Observation data Epoch J2000 Equinox ICRS
- Constellation: Volans
- Right ascension: 08^{h} 32^{m} 41.77^{s}
- Declination: −73° 21′ 24.4″
- Apparent magnitude (V): 6.10±0.01

Characteristics
- Evolutionary stage: horizontal branch
- Spectral type: G8 III
- U−B color index: +0.65
- B−V color index: +0.95

Astrometry
Radial velocity (R_{v})	−26.5±0.4 km/s
Proper motion (μ)	RA: −54.973 mas/yr Dec.: +73.054 mas/yr
Parallax (π)	7.7564±0.0247 mas
Distance	420 ± 1 ly (128.9 ± 0.4 pc)
Absolute magnitude (M_{V})	+0.69

Details
Mass	2.11±0.06 M_{☉}
Radius	10.24±0.16 R_{☉}
Luminosity	59±1 L_{☉}
Surface gravity (log g)	2.73±0.06 cgs
Temperature	5,001±32 K
Metallicity [Fe/H]	−0.09±0.03 dex
Rotational velocity (v sin i)	2.1±1.3 km/s

Other designations
- 33 G. Volantis, CD−72°471, CPD−72°713, GC 11776, HD 73468, HIP 41907, HR 3417, SAO 256524

Database references
SIMBAD	data

HD 73468 (HR 3417) is a solitary star in the southern circumpolar constellation Volans. It is faintly visible to the naked eye with an apparent magnitude of 6.10, and is estimated to be 420 light-years away based on parallax measurements. However, it is approaching the Solar System with a heliocentric radial velocity of −26.5 km/s.

HD 73468 is a star with a classification of G8 III, indicating that it is a giant star. It is currently on the horizontal branch—generating energy via helium fusion in its core. HD 73468 has twice the mass of the Sun but has expanded to 10.24 times the radius of the Sun. It shines with a luminosity of 59 L_{☉} from its swollen photosphere at an effective temperature of 5,001 K, giving a yellow hue. HD 73468 is metal deficient with an iron abundance 81% that of the Sun and spins with a projected rotational velocity of about 2.1 km/s.

== See also ==
- Lists of stars
