= HD 76143 =

Star in the constellation Volans

Observation data Epoch J2000.0 Equinox ICRS
- Constellation: Volans
- Right ascension: 08^{h} 50^{m} 34.82^{s}
- Declination: −66° 47′ 34.7″
- Apparent magnitude (V): 5.33±0.01

Characteristics
- Spectral type: F5 IV
- U−B color index: +0.07
- B−V color index: +0.42

Astrometry
Radial velocity (R_{v})	40.54±0.72 km/s
Proper motion (μ)	RA: +92.718 mas/yr Dec.: +98.946 mas/yr
Parallax (π)	18.8133±0.1088 mas
Distance	173 ± 1 ly (53.2 ± 0.3 pc)
Absolute magnitude (M_{V})	+1.76

Details
Mass	1.4+2.9 −1.9 M_{☉}
Radius	3.21+0.17 −0.1 R_{☉}
Luminosity	17±0.1 L_{☉}
Surface gravity (log g)	3.66±0.14 cgs
Temperature	6544+107 −164 K
Metallicity	115%
Metallicity [Fe/H]	+0.06±0.15 dex
Rotational velocity (v sin i)	140 km/s
Age	2.03 Gyr

Other designations
- 43 G. Volantis, CPD−66 927, HIP 43414, HR 3537, SAO 250347, WDS J08506-6648A

Database references
SIMBAD	data

HD 76143 (HR 3537) is a high proper motion star located in the southern circumpolar constellation Volans. With an apparent magnitude of 5.33, its faintly visible to the naked eye. The star is located 173 light years away from the Solar System, but is drifting with a radial velocity of 40.5 km/s.

== Properties ==
HD 76143 has a classification of "F5 IV", which states its a F-type star that is beginning to evolve off the main sequence. It has 40% more mass than the Sun, but has 3.21 times the radius of the latter. It radiates at 17 solar luminosities at an effective temperature of 6,544 K, which gives it a yellowish-white hue. HD 76143 rotates at a high projected rotational velocity of 140 km/s, which gives it an equatorial bulge 10% larger than its poles. The star has a faint 12 magnitude companion separated 36.7 arcseconds apart.
