= HD 55151 =

Star in the constellation Volans

Observation data Epoch J2000 Equinox ICRS
- Constellation: Volans
- Right ascension: 07^{h} 06^{m} 14.31^{s}
- Declination: −68° 50′ 15.3″
- Apparent magnitude (V): 6.47±0.01

Characteristics
- Evolutionary stage: red giant branch
- Spectral type: K0 III
- U−B color index: +0.87
- B−V color index: +1.04

Astrometry
Radial velocity (R_{v})	−13±0.14 km/s
Proper motion (μ)	RA: +5.690 mas/yr Dec.: −2.103 mas/yr
Parallax (π)	6.3734±0.0192 mas
Distance	512 ± 2 ly (156.9 ± 0.5 pc)
Absolute magnitude (M_{V})	+0.43

Details
Mass	2.00±0.27 M_{☉}
Radius	12.7 R_{☉}
Luminosity	49 L_{☉}
Surface gravity (log g)	2.77±0.14 cgs
Temperature	4,282 K
Metallicity [Fe/H]	−0.02±0.05 dex
Rotational velocity (v sin i)	<1 km/s
Age	345 Myr

Other designations
- 7 G. Volantis, CD−68 447, HD 55151, HIP 34270, HR 2712, SAO 249740

Database references
SIMBAD	data

HD 55151 (HR 2712) is a solitary star located in the circumpolar constellation Volans. With an apparent magnitude of 6.47, it is near the limit of naked eye visibility. The star is located 512 light years away from the Solar System, but is drifting closer with a heliocentric radial velocity of −13 km/s.

HD 55151 has a stellar classification of K0 III, which states that it is an early K-type star that has exhausted hydrogen at its core and left the main sequence. It has twice the Sun's mass, but has expanded to 13 times the Sun's girth. It radiates at 49 solar luminosities from its enlarged photosphere at an effective temperature of 4,282 K, which gives it the orangish-yellow hue of a K-type star. HD 55151 belongs to the thin disk population, and is slightly metal deficient. However, it has a projected rotational velocity that is too low to be measured.
