= HD 49947 =

Star in the constellation of Volans

Observation data Epoch J2000.0 Equinox ICRS
- Constellation: Volans
- Right ascension: 06^{h} 43^{m} 36.7555^{s}
- Declination: −73° 07′ 05.551″
- Apparent magnitude (V): 6.36

Characteristics
- Evolutionary stage: Horizontal branch
- Spectral type: G8 III
- U−B color index: +0.66
- B−V color index: +0.96

Astrometry
Radial velocity (R_{v})	15.88±0.84 km/s
Proper motion (μ)	RA: +11.312 mas/yr Dec.: −98.389 mas/yr
Parallax (π)	7.1106±0.0193 mas
Distance	459 ± 1 ly (140.6 ± 0.4 pc)
Absolute magnitude (M_{V})	+0.68

Details
Mass	2.07±0.06 M_{☉}
Radius	10.33±0.13 R_{☉}
Luminosity	58.3±0.9 L_{☉}
Surface gravity (log g)	2.65±0.06 cgs
Temperature	4,964±25 K
Metallicity [Fe/H]	−0.17±0.02 dex
Rotational velocity (v sin i)	1.1±1.4 km/s
Age	1.27 Gyr

Other designations
- 3 G. Volantis, CD−72°351, CPD−72°522, FK5 2522, GC 8881, HD 49947, HIP 32222, HR 2531, SAO 256330

Database references
SIMBAD	data

HD 49947 (HR 2531) is a solitary star in the southern circumpolar constellation Volans. It has an apparent magnitude of 6.36, placing it near the max naked eye visibility. Parallax measurements place the object at a distance of 459 light years but is receding with a heliocentric radial velocity of 15.88 km/s

HD 49947 has a stellar classification of G8 III and is a red clump giant, meaning that it is located on the warm end of the horizontal branch. At present it has double the mass of the Sun and at an age of 1.27 billion years, has expanded to an enlarged radius of 10.33 solar radii. It radiates at 61 times the luminosity of the Sun from its enlarged photosphere at an effective temperature of 4,964 K, giving a yellow hue. HD 49947 is metal deficient with an iron abundance 68% that of Sun and spins very slowly.
