= HD 77887 =

Star in the constellation Volans

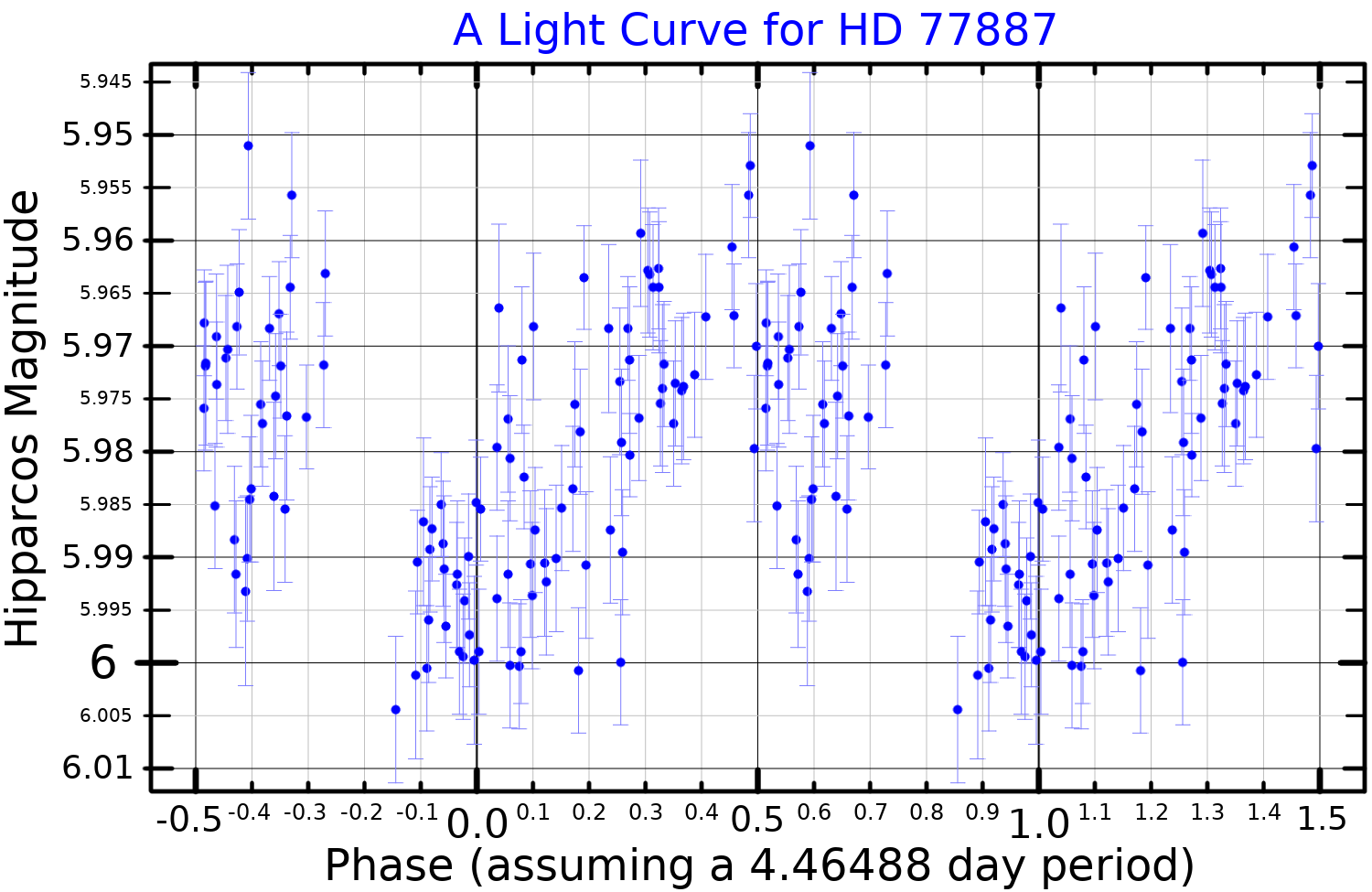
- A light curve for HD 77887, plotted from Hipparcos data

Observation data Epoch J2000.0 Equinox ICRS
- Constellation: Volans
- Right ascension: 09^{h} 01^{m} 08.5140^{s}
- Declination: −68° 41′ 02.110″
- Apparent magnitude (V): 5.87±0.01

Characteristics
- Evolutionary stage: AGB
- Spectral type: M1 III
- U−B color index: +1.96
- B−V color index: +1.63
- Variable type: Lb

Astrometry
Radial velocity (R_{v})	12.6±0.4 km/s
Proper motion (μ)	RA: +16.413 mas/yr Dec.: −0.069 mas/yr
Parallax (π)	4.2938±0.051 mas
Distance	760 ± 9 ly (233 ± 3 pc)
Absolute magnitude (M_{V})	−0.78

Details
Mass	1.12 M_{☉}
Radius	56.73 R_{☉}
Luminosity	598 L_{☉}
Surface gravity (log g)	0.9 cgs
Temperature	3,820 K

Other designations
- 45 G. Volantis, NSV 18118, CPD−68°879, GC 12510, HD 77887, HIP 44283, HR 3610, SAO 250421

Database references
SIMBAD	data

HD 77887 (HR 3610) is a solitary star located in the southern circumpolar constellation Volans. It has an apparent magnitude of 5.87, making it faintly visible to the naked eye if viewed under ideal conditions. The star is situated at a distance of about 760 light years but is receding with a heliocentric radial velocity of 12.6 km/s.

HD 77887 is an ageing M-type giant that is currently on the asymptotic giant branch. At present it has 1.12 times the mass of the Sun but has expanded to 56.73 times its girth. It shines at 598 L_{☉} from its enlarged photosphere at an effective temperature of 3,820 K, which gives it a red glow. HD 77887 is suspected to be a slow irregular variable whose brightness fluctuates at a tenth of a magnitude. Koen and Eyer examined the Hipparcos data for the star, and found that it varied periodically, with an amplitude of 0.012 magnitudes, and a period of 4.4649 days.
