= HD 70514 =

Star in the constellation Volans

- HD 70514 is the star circled in red.

Observation data Epoch J2000.0 Equinox ICRS
- Constellation: Volans
- Right ascension: 08^{h} 18^{m} 18.80687^{s}
- Declination: −65° 36′ 47.4919″
- Apparent magnitude (V): 5.06±0.01

Characteristics
- Evolutionary stage: RGB
- Spectral type: K1 III
- U−B color index: +1.19
- B−V color index: +1.15

Astrometry
Radial velocity (R_{v})	0.00±1.78 km/s
Proper motion (μ)	RA: +21.054 mas/yr Dec.: +21.799 mas/yr
Parallax (π)	10.9324±0.0626 mas
Distance	298 ± 2 ly (91.5 ± 0.5 pc)
Absolute magnitude (M_{V})	+0.26

Details
Mass	1.88±0.29 M_{☉}
Radius	14.6 R_{☉}
Luminosity	93±1 L_{☉}
Surface gravity (log g)	2.27±0.47 cgs
Temperature	4,610±90 K
Metallicity [Fe/H]	+0.22 dex
Rotational velocity (v sin i)	<1 km/s

Other designations
- 24 G. Volantis, CPD−65°907, GC 11366, HD 70514, HIP 40680, HR 3280, SAO 250186

Database references
SIMBAD	data

HD 70514, also known as HR 3280, is a solitary, orange hued star located in the southern circumpolar constellation Volans, the flying fish. It has an apparent magnitude of 5.06, making it one of the brighter members of this generally faint constellation. Based on parallax measurements from the Gaia spacecraft, the star is estimated to be 298 light years distant. It appears that its distance to the Solar System isn't changing, having a heliocentric radial velocity of 0 km/s. Eggen (1994) lists it as a member of the thin disk population.

HD 70514 is classified as a red giant, having a stellar classification of K1 III. It is currently on the red giant branch, fusing a hydrogen shell around an inert helium. As a result, it has expanded to 14.6 times radius of the Sun and now radiates 93 times its luminosity from its enlarged photosphere at an effective temperature of 4,610 K. Based on asteroseismologic measurements, HD 70514 has a mass 1.88 times that of the Sun. HR 3280 is metal enriched, having a metallicity 66% above solar levels. Like most giants, it rotates rather slowly, having a projected rotational velocity of <1 km/s.
