= Theta Volantis =

A-type main sequence star in the constellation Volans

θ Volantis
- Location of θ Volantis

Observation data Epoch J2000.0 Equinox ICRS
- Constellation: Volans
- Right ascension: 08^{h} 39^{m} 05.16145^{s}
- Declination: −70° 23′ 12.2826″
- Apparent magnitude (V): 5.19

Characteristics
- Spectral type: A0 V
- U−B color index: −0.03
- B−V color index: +0.01

Astrometry
Radial velocity (R_{v})	13.00±4.2 km/s
Proper motion (μ)	RA: +19.15 mas/yr Dec.: −38.28 mas/yr
Parallax (π)	13.58±0.20 mas
Distance	240 ± 4 ly (74 ± 1 pc)
Absolute magnitude (M_{V})	+1.21

Details
Mass	2.3 M_{☉}
Luminosity	37 L_{☉}
Surface gravity (log g)	4.08 cgs
Temperature	8,753 K
Rotational velocity (v sin i)	98 km/s
Age	185−364 Myr

Other designations
- θ Vol, CPD−69°946, FK5 2683, HD 74405, HIP 42425, HR 3460, SAO 256535

Database references
SIMBAD	data

Theta Volantis, Latinized from θ Volantis, is a solitary star in the southern constellation of Volans. Based upon parallax measurements, is approximately 240 light years from the Sun. It has an apparent visual magnitude of 5.19, which is bright enough to be faintly visible to the naked eye.

Theta Volantis is an A-type main sequence star with a stellar classification of A0 V and a mass around 2.3 times that of the Sun. It is a young star with an estimated age of a few hundred million years, and is spinning rapidly with a projected rotational velocity of 98 km/s. Theta Volantis shines 37 times as brightly as the Sun, with an effective temperature of 8,753 K in its outer atmosphere.

The star has two optical companions: a magnitude 15.0 star at an angular separation of 22.10″ along a position angle of 58°, and a magnitude 10.64 star at an angular separation of 41.3″ along a position angle of 105° (both as of 2000).
