= HD 76920 =

Orange star

- Location of HD 76920 (circled)

Observation data Epoch J2000.0 Equinox ICRS
- Constellation: Volans
- Right ascension: 08^{h} 55^{m} 16.81719^{s}
- Declination: −67° 15′ 55.7009″
- Apparent magnitude (V): 7.82

Characteristics
- Evolutionary stage: Red giant branch
- Spectral type: K1 III
- B−V color index: 1.11
- J−H color index: 0.537
- J−K color index: 0.693

Astrometry
Radial velocity (R_{v})	19.73±0.12 km/s
Proper motion (μ)	RA: 25.253 mas/yr Dec.: 25.659 mas/yr
Parallax (π)	5.4618±0.0187 mas
Distance	597 ± 2 ly (183.1 ± 0.6 pc)
Absolute magnitude (M_{V})	+1.89

Details
Mass	1.22±0.11 M_{☉}
Radius	8.68±0.34 R_{☉}
Luminosity	29.5+1.3 −1.0 L_{☉}
Surface gravity (log g)	2.648±0.037 cgs
Temperature	4664±53 K
Metallicity [Fe/H]	−0.19±0.06 dex
Rotational velocity (v sin i)	2.5±0.3 km/s
Age	5.2±1.4 Gyr

Other designations
- CD−66°659, CPD−66°943, HD 76920, HIP 43803, SAO 250379, PPM 357010, TIC 302372658, TYC 8939-1192-1, GSC 08939-01192, 2MASS J08551682-6715555

Database references
SIMBAD	data

HD 76920 is a solitary orange-hued star with an orbiting exoplanetary companion in the southern constellation of Volans, close to the border with Carina. With an apparent magnitude of 7.82, it is too faint to be seen by the naked eye from Earth but is readily observable through binoculars. It is located at a distance of 597 light-years (183 parsecs) according to Gaia DR3 parallax measurements, and is moving away at a heliocentric radial velocity of 20.09 km/s.

== Stellar properties ==
This is an aging giant star with a stellar classification of K1 III. At the age of 5.2±1.4 billion years, it has evolved past the main sequence after depleting its hydrogen supply at the core. Currently, it is in the midst of ascending the red-giant branch (RGB), fast approaching the RGB bump, where deep stellar convection temporarily stalls the ascent. As expected of RGB stars, it exhibits solar-like oscillations. It has 1.22 times the mass of the Sun but has expanded to 8.68 times the Sun's radius. The star is radiating 29.5 times the luminosity of the Sun from its inflated photosphere at an effective temperature of 4,664 K (4,391 °C; 7,936 °F).

== Planetary system ==
In 2017, radial-velocity observations made using spectrographs at the Anglo-Australian Telescope, the Cerro Tololo Inter-American Observatory, and the MPG/ESO telescope revealed the existence of an exoplanet around HD 76920. The planet, HD 76920 b, is an eccentric Jupiter with a minimum mass of 3.57 M_{J} and a very high orbital eccentricity of 0.8782, which at the time of discovery made it the most eccentric known planet orbiting an evolved star. Since the host star appears to be single, this was likely caused by a scattering event rather than Kozai oscillations.

Because of its high eccentricity, despite an Earth-like semi-major axis of 1.165 AU and a period of 415.891 days (1.13865 years), the planet approaches the star to within 2.4 stellar radii at its perihelion. Currently, this is not causing any substantial orbital decay; thus the planet is expected to hold on for the next 50–80 million years without falling into the star. However, after about 100 million years, stellar evolution and tidal interactions will doom it to be engulfed.

The planet has a relatively high probability (16%) to transit its host star, but such a transit has yet to be detected by TESS.

The HD 76920 planetary system
Companion (in order from star)	Mass	Semimajor axis (AU)	Orbital period (days)	Eccentricity	Inclination (°)	Radius
b	≥ 3.57 ± 0.22 M_{J}	1.165 ± 0.035	415.891 ^{+0.043}_{−0.039}	0.8782 ± 0.0025	—	1.17 R_{J}

== See also ==
- Kepler-432b: another eccentric super-Jupiter orbiting a K-type giant star.
- HD 20782 b: the most eccentric known exoplanet.
