= UY Volantis =

Low mass X-ray binary in the constellation Volans

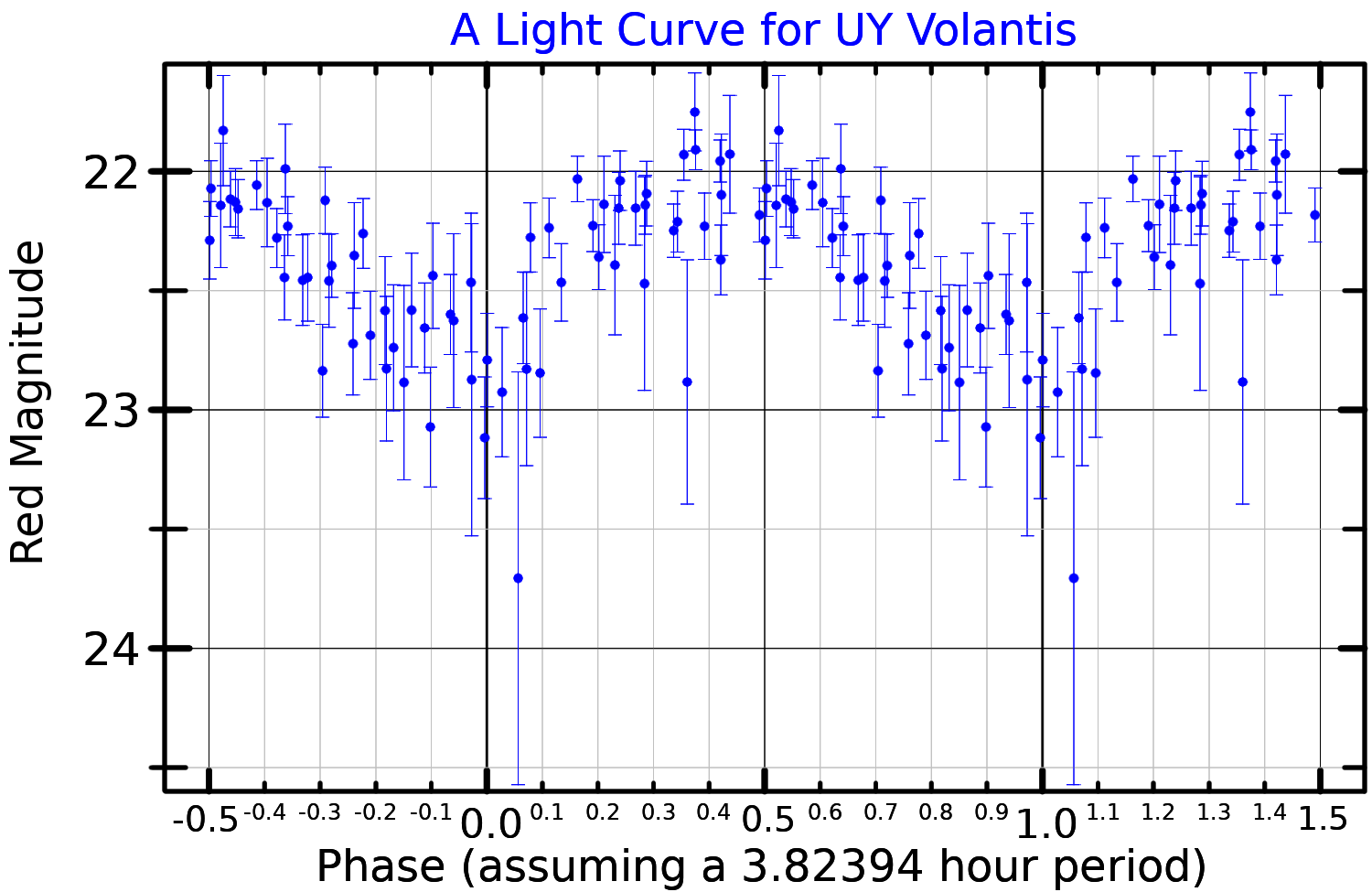
- A red band light curve for UY Volantis, adapted from Hynes and Jones (2009)

Observation data Epoch J2000 Equinox ICRS
- Constellation: Volans
- Right ascension: 07^{h} 48^{m} 33.71^{s}
- Declination: −67° 45′ 07.7″
- Apparent magnitude (V): 16.9

Characteristics
- Apparent magnitude (U): 16.10
- Apparent magnitude (B): 17
- Apparent magnitude (R): 16.7

Astrometry
Radial velocity (R_{v})	20 km/s
Distance	6,800 - 9,100 pc

Other designations
- EXO 0748-676

Database references
SIMBAD	data

UY Volantis, also known as EXO 0748-676, is a low mass X-ray binary system located in the constellation Volans. With an apparent magnitude of 16.9, it requires a powerful telescope to see. With a radial velocity of 20 km/s, it is drifting away from the Solar System, and is currently located 26,000 light years away.

The discovery of EXO 0748-676, in EXOSAT data, was announced by Arvid N. Parmar et al. in 1985.

== Properties ==
The properties of the two system components are uncertain and contradictory. One component is almost certain to be a neutron star, which has a fairly strict upper mass limit. The other component is a low mass star, but its properties are affected by the close neutron star. The two components orbit each other every 3.82 hours.

The system undergoes x-ray eclipses which can be used to constrain the properties of the orbit and of the component stars. The orbital inclination must be high and is thought to be about 76°. The mass ratio of the components is relatively well-known and shows the neutron star to be about four times as massive as its partner. This implies either an unusually low-mass star or an unusually high-mass neutron star. Simple models produce neutron star masses above 3 M_{☉} which is theoretically impossible. More complex models of the system produced by measuring the eclipses still produce an unexpectedly high neutron star mass of about 2 M_{☉} which would make it one of the highest known. A more expected neutron star mass of around 1.4 M_{☉} can be deduced by making certain assumptions about the origin of the spectral lines or an unusually low-mass companion.
