= HD 49268 =

Star in the constellation Volans

Observation data Epoch J2000 Equinox ICRS
- Constellation: Volans
- Right ascension: 06^{h} 40^{m} 57.6024^{s}
- Declination: −71° 46′ 30.687″
- Apparent magnitude (V): 6.49±0.01

Characteristics
- Evolutionary stage: red giant branch
- Spectral type: K1 III CNII
- U−B color index: +1.06
- B−V color index: +1.11

Astrometry
| Radial velocity (R_{v}) | 20.6±0.4 km/s |
| Proper motion (μ) | RA: +21.453 mas/yr Dec.: −40.165 mas/yr |
| Parallax (π) | 7.1467±0.0222 mas |
| Distance | 456 ± 1 ly (139.9 ± 0.4 pc) |
| Absolute magnitude (M_{V}) | +0.89 |

Details
| Mass | 1.36 M_{☉} |
| Radius | 10.77 R_{☉} |
| Luminosity | 60.2^{+2.8}_{−2.7} L_{☉} |
| Surface gravity (log g) | 2.48 cgs |
| Temperature | 4,660±90 K |
| Metallicity [Fe/H] | +0.07 dex |
| Rotational velocity (v sin i) | <1.6 km/s |

Other designations
- 2 G. Volantis, CD−71°357, CPD−71°476, HD 49268, HIP 31977, HR 2505, SAO 256326, WDS J06410-7147A

Database references
| SIMBAD | data |

HD 49268 (HR 2505) is a solitary star in the southern circumpolar constellation Volans. It has an apparent magnitude of +6.49, placing it near the limit of naked eye visibility. Parallax measurements place the object at a distance of 456 light years; it is receding with a heliocentric radial velocity of 20.6 km/s.

The stellar classification of HD 49268 is K1 III CNII, indicating that it is an ageing red giant with a strong over-abundance of cyano radical in its stellar atmosphere. It has 136% the mass of the Sun but expanded to 10.77 times its girth. It is radiating 60 times the luminosity of the Sun from its enlarged photosphere at an effective temperature of 4,660 K, giving it an orange hue. HD 49268 is slightly metal enriched with an iron abundance 117% that of the Sun and is believed to be a member of the thick disk population. It spins leisurely with a projected rotational velocity that is lower than 1.6 km/s.

HD 49268 has two faint companions listed in the Washington Double Star Catalogue: a tenth magnitude star 17″ away; and a 13th magnitude star 65″ away. Both are unrelated background stars.
