= HD 63584 =

Star in the constellation Volans

Observation data Epoch J2000 Equinox J2000
- Constellation: Volans
- Right ascension: 07^{h} 44^{m} 13.00^{s}
- Declination: −69° 49′ 17.8″
- Apparent magnitude (V): 6.15±0.01

Characteristics
- Evolutionary stage: main sequence
- Spectral type: A0 IV/V
- U−B color index: −0.09
- B−V color index: −0.06

Astrometry
Radial velocity (R_{v})	10.4±1.1 km/s
Proper motion (μ)	RA: −41.901 mas/yr Dec.: +9.492 mas/yr
Parallax (π)	7.7630±0.0578 mas
Distance	420 ± 3 ly (128.8 ± 1.0 pc)
Absolute magnitude (M_{V})	+0.68

Details
Mass	2.58±0.05 M_{☉}
Radius	3.09±0.37 R_{☉}
Luminosity	60±6 L_{☉}
Surface gravity (log g)	3.84±0.29 cgs
Temperature	9,954±46 K
Metallicity	71% solar
Metallicity [Fe/H]	−0.15 dex
Rotational velocity (v sin i)	19 km/s
Age	256±23 Myr

Other designations
- 18 G. Volantis, CD−69 475, HD 63584, HIP 37720, HR 3038, SAO 249943

Database references
SIMBAD	data

HD 63584 (HR 3038) is a solitary star in the southern circumpolar constellation Volans. With an apparent magnitude of 6.15, it is barely visible to the naked eye under ideal conditions. The star is located 420 light years away based on parallax, but is drifting away with a radial velocity of 10.4 km/s.

HD 63584 has a classification of "A0 IV/V", which states it is an A0 star with the characteristics of a main sequence and subgiant star. It has 2.58 times the Sun's mass, but a radius around 3 times that of the Sun. HD 63584 radiates at 60 times the Sun's luminosity from its photosphere at an effective temperature of 9,954 K, which gives it the blueish-white hue of an A0 star. Despite the "IV" part of the classification, HD 63584 is only 256 million years old, having completed only 59.6% of its main sequence lifetime.
