= Beta Volantis =

Star in the constellation Volans

- Location of β Volantis.

Observation data Epoch J2000 Equinox ICRS
- Constellation: Volans
- Right ascension: 08^{h} 25^{m} 44.19472^{s}
- Declination: −66° 08′ 12.8050″
- Apparent magnitude (V): 3.75

Characteristics
- Evolutionary stage: horizontal branch
- Spectral type: K2 III
- B−V color index: +1.13

Astrometry
Radial velocity (R_{v})	+27.4±0.7 km/s
Proper motion (μ)	RA: −35.74±0.10 mas/yr Dec.: −152.22±0.10 mas/yr
Parallax (π)	30.33±0.10 mas
Distance	107.5 ± 0.4 ly (33.0 ± 0.1 pc)
Absolute magnitude (M_{V})	+1.18

Details
Mass	1.62±0.20 M_{☉}
Radius	10.0 R_{☉}
Luminosity	42 L_{☉}
Surface gravity (log g)	2.30 cgs
Temperature	4,650 K
Metallicity [Fe/H]	−0.01 dex
Rotational velocity (v sin i)	<1.0 km/s

Other designations
- β Vol, CD−65°648, GJ 3499, HD 71878, HIP 41312, HR 3347, SAO 250228

Database references
SIMBAD	data

Beta Volantis, Latinized from β Volantis, is the second-brightest star of the southern constellation of Volans, after Gamma2 Volantis. It has an apparent visual magnitude of 3.75, which is sufficiently bright to allow it to be viewed with the naked eye. Based upon an annual parallax shift of 30.33 mas as seen from Earth, its distance can be estimated as 107.5 light years from the Sun. The star is moving away from the Sun with a radial velocity of +27 km/s.

This is a single, orange-hued star with a stellar classification of K2 III, indicating it is an evolved K-type giant star. It is a red clump star, which means it is on the horizontal branch and is generating energy through helium fusion at its core. The stellar mass has been estimated via astroseismology, giving a value of 1.6 times the mass of the Sun. It has expanded to 10 times the radius of the Sun and is radiating about 42 times the Sun's luminosity from its enlarged photosphere at an effective temperature of 4,650 K.
