= Eta Volantis =

Star in the constellation Volans

η Volantis
- Location of η Volantis.

Observation data Epoch J2000.0 Equinox J2000.0
- Constellation: Volans
- Right ascension: 08^{h} 22^{m} 04.45155^{s}
- Declination: −73° 23′ 59.9258″
- Apparent magnitude (V): 5.28±0.01

Characteristics
- Evolutionary stage: main sequence
- Spectral type: A0/1 IV/V
- B−V color index: +0.01

Astrometry
Radial velocity (R_{v})	+20.0±3.7 km/s
Proper motion (μ)	RA: −29.432 mas/yr Dec.: +29.926 mas/yr
Parallax (π)	8.4310±0.0887 mas
Distance	387 ± 4 ly (119 ± 1 pc)
Absolute magnitude (M_{V})	−0.06

Details
Mass	2.73±0.08 M_{☉}
Radius	3.78±0.12 R_{☉}
Luminosity	84 L_{☉}
Surface gravity (log g)	3.81±0.04 cgs
Temperature	9,789±427 K
Rotational velocity (v sin i)	214 km/s
Age	347 Myr

Other designations
- η Vol, CPD−72°694, FK5 2653, HD 71576, HIP 41003, HR 3334, SAO 256505

Database references
SIMBAD	data

Eta Volantis, Latinized from η Volantis, is a single star in the southern constellation of Volans. It has an apparent visual magnitude of 5.28, which is bright enough to be seen with the naked eye as a dim, white-hued star. Based upon parallax measurements, it is approximately 387 light years from the Sun. The star is moving further away from the Sun with a radial velocity of 20 km/s.

This is an A-type star with a stellar classification of A0/1 IV/V, displaying blended spectrum that shows aspects of a main sequence star and a subgiant. Stellar evolution models from Zorec and Royer (2012) place it on the main sequence turnoff, having completed 90.7% of its time on the main sequence. The star is estimated to be 347 million years old and is spinning rapidly with a projected rotational velocity of 214 km/s. It has 2.73 times the mass of the Sun and 3.43 times the Sun's radius. Eta Volantis is radiating 84 times the luminosity of the Sun from its photosphere at an effective temperature of 9,789 K.

Eta Volantis has two 12th magnitude optical companions at angular separations of 26.8 and 48.1 arcseconds.
