= HD 76700 b =

Extrasolar planet in the constellation Volans

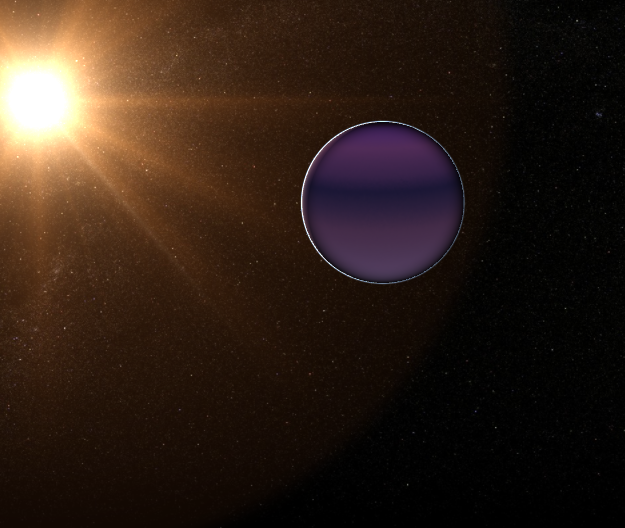
- An artist's impression of HD 76700 b orbiting its host star.

Discovery
- Discovered by: Tinney, Butler, Marcy et al.
- Discovery site: (Australia) Anglo-Australian Telescope
- Discovery date: July 5, 2002
- Detection method: Radial velocity

Orbital characteristics
- Semi-major axis: 0.0511 ± 0.0030 AU (7,640,000 ± 450,000 km)
- Eccentricity: 0.10±0.08
- Orbital period (sidereal): 3.97097±0.00023 d
- Time of perihelion: 2451213.32±0.67 JD
- Argument of perihelion: 30°
- Semi-amplitude: 27.6±1.7
- Star: HD 76700

Physical characteristics
- Mean radius: 0.99 R_{J}
- Mass: 0.21±0.03 M_{J}
- Surface gravity: 5.82 m/s^{2}
- Temperature: 1316+85 −252 K

HD 76700 b is an exoplanet orbiting the G-type main sequence star HD 76700, approximately 198 light years away in the southern constellation Volans. The planet was discovered in 2002, and was announced in 2003.

== Discovery ==
In 2002, a group of scientists detected planets around multiple stars, along with HD 76700. Unlike the other planets, HD 76700 b has a short and circular orbit; however, according to the newest data, the planet's orbit may be slightly eccentric.

== Properties ==
Due to the planet's high mass, it is a gas giant similar to Saturn. HD 76700 b was detected indirectly, so properties such as its radius, inclination, and temperature is unknown. HD 76700 b has a short four day orbit around its host due to it being eight times closer than Mercury is to the Sun.
