= HD 60150 =

Orange star in the constellation Volans

Observation data Epoch J2000 Equinox ICRS
- Constellation: Volans
- Right ascension: 07^{h} 28^{m} 51.4078^{s}
- Declination: −64° 30′ 35.301″
- Apparent magnitude (V): 6.39±0.01

Characteristics
- Evolutionary stage: red giant branch
- Spectral type: K5 III
- U−B color index: +1.84
- B−V color index: +1.54

Astrometry
Radial velocity (R_{v})	13.4±0.4 km/s
Proper motion (μ)	RA: +4.940 mas/yr Dec.: −8.876 mas/yr
Parallax (π)	4.419±0.029 mas
Distance	738 ± 5 ly (226 ± 1 pc)
Absolute magnitude (M_{V})	−0.34

Details
Mass	1.2 M_{☉}
Radius	41.18 R_{☉}
Luminosity	329±5 L_{☉}
Surface gravity (log g)	1.24 cgs
Temperature	4,007±122 K
Metallicity [Fe/H]	+0.14 dex
Rotational velocity (v sin i)	1.8±1.2 km/s

Other designations
- 12 G. Volantis, CD−64°273, CPD−64°721, FK5 2584, GC 10057, HD 60150, HIP 36346, HR 2888, SAO 249864

Database references
SIMBAD	data

HD 60150 (HR 2888) is a solitary star located in the southern circumpolar constellation Volans. It has an apparent magnitude of 6.39, placing it near the limit for naked eye visibility. Parallax measurements place the star at a distance of 738 light years and it is currently receding with a heliocentric radial velocity of 13.4 km/s.

HD 60150 has a classification of K5 III, indicating that it is a red giant. It has 1.2 times the mass of the Sun but has expanded to 41 times its girth. It radiates 329 times the luminosity of the Sun from its swollen photosphere at an effective temperature of 4,007 K, giving it a reddish orange hue. HD 60150 is metal enriched, with an iron abundance 38% greater than the Sun. It spins leisurely with projected rotational velocity of about 1.8 km/s.
