= HD 64484 =

Star in the constellation Volans

Observation data Epoch J2000 Equinox ICRS
- Constellation: Volans
- Right ascension: 07^{h} 49^{m} 40.9911^{s}
- Declination: −66° 11′ 45.504″
- Apparent magnitude (V): 5.76±0.01

Characteristics
- Evolutionary stage: main sequence
- Spectral type: B9 V
- U−B color index: −0.16
- B−V color index: −0.04

Astrometry
Radial velocity (R_{v})	11±4.3 km/s
Proper motion (μ)	RA: −2.037 mas/yr Dec.: −0.411 mas/yr
Parallax (π)	7.1191±0.0628 mas
Distance	458 ± 4 ly (140 ± 1 pc)
Absolute magnitude (M_{V})	−0.11

Details
Mass	2.80±0.13 M_{☉}
Radius	3.3±0.3 R_{☉}
Luminosity	140±8 L_{☉}
Surface gravity (log g)	3.86±0.06 cgs
Temperature	10,544±48 K
Metallicity [Fe/H]	0.00 dex
Rotational velocity (v sin i)	154 km/s
Age	339^{+50}_{−44} Myr

Other designations
- 19 G. Volantis, CPD−65°827, FK5 2610, GC 10628, HD 64484, HIP 38210, HR 3081, SAO 249978

Database references
SIMBAD	data

HD 64484 (HR 3081) is a solitary star in the southern circumpolar constellation Volans. With an apparent magnitude of 5.76, it is faintly visible to the naked eye under dark skies. Parallax measurements place it at a distance of 458 light years but is receding with a heliocentric radial velocity of 11 km/s.

HD 64484 has a stellar classification of B9 V, indicating that it is an ordinary B-type main-sequence star. It has 2.8 times the mass of the Sun and an effective temperature of 10,544 K, giving it a bluish white hue. However, a slightly enlarged radius of 3.3 R_{☉} yields a luminosity 140 times that of the Sun. This is due to HD 64484 completing 80.6% of its main sequence lifetime at an age of 339 million years. The star has a solar metallicity and like many hot stars — spins rapidly with a projected rotational velocity of 154 km/s.
