= HD 50002 =

Star in the constellation Volans

Observation data Epoch J2000 Equinox ICRS
- Constellation: Volans
- Right ascension: 06^{h} 44^{m} 55.6456^{s}
- Declination: −70° 26′ 01.527″
- Apparent magnitude (V): 6.09±0.01

Characteristics
- Evolutionary stage: red giant branch
- Spectral type: K3 III
- U−B color index: +1.50
- B−V color index: +1.33

Astrometry
Radial velocity (R_{v})	5.1±0.4 km/s
Proper motion (μ)	RA: −16.313 mas/yr Dec.: +6.287 mas/yr
Parallax (π)	4.6072±0.0320 mas
Distance	708 ± 5 ly (217 ± 2 pc)
Absolute magnitude (M_{V})	−0.35

Details
Mass	1.23 M_{☉}
Radius	27.86 R_{☉}
Luminosity	257±5 L_{☉}
Surface gravity (log g)	1.59 cgs
Temperature	4,444±122 K
Metallicity [Fe/H]	+0.22 dex
Rotational velocity (v sin i)	<1 km/s

Other designations
- 4 G. Volantis, CPD−70°560, GC 8895, HD 50002, HIP 32332, HR 2536, SAO 256331

Database references
SIMBAD	data

HD 50002 (HR 2536) is a solitary star in the southern circumpolar constellation Volans. It is faintly visible to the naked eye with an apparent magnitude of 6.09 and is located at a distance of 708 light years. However, it is drifting further with a heliocentric radial velocity of 5.1 km/s.

HD 50002 has a classification of K3 III, indicating that it is a red giant. HD 50002 has a comparable mass to the Sun, but has expanded to an enlarged radius of 27.9 R_{☉}. It radiates at 257 times the luminosity of the Sun from its photosphere at an effective temperature of 4,444 K, giving an orange hue. HD 50002 is metal enriched, with 166% the abundance of heavy metals compared to the Sun, and has a projected rotational velocity too low to be measured accurately.
