= NGC 2434 =

Elliptical galaxy in the constellation Volans

- NGC 2434 seen by Dark Energy Spectroscopic Instrument Legacy Surveys

Observation data (J2000 epoch)
- Constellation: Volans
- Right ascension: 07^{h} 34^{m} 51.1806^{s}
- Declination: −69° 17′ 02.843″
- Redshift: 0.004637
- Galactocentric velocity: 300 km/s
- Distance: 88 Mly (27 Mpc)
- Group or cluster: LGG 147
- Apparent magnitude (V): 11.26
- Apparent magnitude (B): 12.5
- Surface brightness: 23.35 mag/arcsec^{2}
- Magnitude (J): 8.87
- Magnitude (H): 8.14
- Magnitude (K): 7.89

Characteristics
- Type: E0-1
- Mass: 8.541 ± 0.323 M⊙ M_{☉}

Other designations
- 2MASX J07345116-6917029, WISEA J073451.18-691702.8, NGC 2434

NGC 2434 is an elliptical galaxy located in the constellation Volans. It was discovered by John Herschel in 1864. He described it as faint, small, round and pretty much brighter in the middle. There are three foreground stars in the same field of view, 11 arcminutes north of NGC 2434.

It is part of a galaxy group known as LGG 147, which consists of at least of five members. The members of the group are NGC 2397, NGC 2442, NGC 2443, NGC 2434 and PGC 20690. NGC 2434 has a diameter of 31.29 kiloparsecs.

Roughly half its mass within an effective radius is dark matter. Another source states NGC 2434 is a lenticular galaxy. NGC 2434 has a star formation rate (SFR) of 0.016 ± 0.010 M⊙/yr. It has an age of $10^{8.48}$ yr or around 300 million years.

NGC 2434 is detected weakly at a 20 cm radio wavelength ($S_{20cm}$ = 2.0 ± 0.1 mJy) and is not detected in wide-field infrared survey explorer (WISE) W3 Polycyclic aromatic hydrocarbon (PAH) or total infrared, indicating little dust or a quiescent galaxy. WISE photometry of NGC 2434 has flux densities of 141.7 ± 0.6 mJy at 3.4 μm (W1), 78.0 ± 0.3 mJy at 4.6 μm (W2), and 20.6 ± 0.1 mJy at 12 μm (W3). The strong W1 and W2 indicates an old stellar population, while W3<W2 indicates little warm dust or PAH emission.
