= HD 68402 =

Star in the constellation Volans with a planet

Observation data Epoch J2000.0 Equinox J2000.0 (ICRS)
- Constellation: Volans
- Right ascension: 08^{h} 05^{m} 23.69129^{s}
- Declination: −74° 24′ 37.4873″
- Apparent magnitude (V): 9.09 ± 0.02

Characteristics
- Evolutionary stage: main sequence
- Spectral type: G5 IV/V
- B−V color index: +0.68

Astrometry
Radial velocity (R_{v})	11.60 ± 0.49 km/s
Proper motion (μ)	RA: −78.195 mas/yr Dec.: +78.973 mas/yr
Parallax (π)	12.7204±0.0101 mas
Distance	256.4 ± 0.2 ly (78.61 ± 0.06 pc)
Absolute magnitude (M_{V})	+4.66

Details
Mass	1.12 ± 0.05 M_{☉}
Radius	1.02 ± 0.05 R_{☉}
Luminosity	1.17+0.06 −0.07 L_{☉}
Surface gravity (log g)	4.43 ± 0.04 cgs
Temperature	5,907 ± 68 K
Metallicity [Fe/H]	+0.29 ± 0.10 dex
Rotational velocity (v sin i)	2.9 ± 0.2 km/s
Age	1 ± 0.9 Gyr

Other designations
- CD−74°392, CPD−74°486, HD 68402, HIP 39589

Database references
SIMBAD	data
Exoplanet Archive	data

HD 68402 is a solitary star located in the circumpolar constellation Volans. With an apparent magnitude of 9.09, it is invisible to the naked eye but can be seen with an amateur telescope. This star is located at a distance of 256 light years based on its parallax shift but is drifting away at a rate of 11.60 km/s.

HD 68402 has a classification of G5 IV/V, which indicates that it is a G5 star with the characteristics of a subgiant and main-sequence star. Contrary to its classification, it is actually a G1 dwarf. At present it is slightly more massive than the Sun and has a similar radius to the latter. It radiates at 1.17 times the luminosity of the Sun from its photosphere at an effective temperature of 5,907 K, which gives it a yellow hue. At an age of 1 billion years HD 68402 has a projected rotational velocity of almost 3 km/s and is metal rich like most planetary hosts (1.94 times to be exact).

== Planetary system ==
In 2017, a superjovian planet was discovered using doppler spectroscopy data from HARPS and CORALIE. In 2023, the inclination and true mass of HD 68402 b were determined via astrometry.

The HD 68402 planetary system
Companion (in order from star)	Mass	Semimajor axis (AU)	Orbital period (years)	Eccentricity	Inclination (°)	Radius
b	7.9+1.7 −1.5 M_{J}	2.239+0.11 −0.075	3.15+0.22 −0.14	0.225+0.15 −0.082	20.3+6.2 −4.1 or 159.7+4.1 −6.2	—
