= CD−73°375 =

Binary star in the constellation Volans

- Location of CD−73°375 (circled)

Observation data Epoch J2000.0 Equinox ICRS
- Constellation: Volans
- A
- Right ascension: 07^{h} 35^{m} 21.656^{s}
- Declination: −74° 16′ 29.83″
- Apparent magnitude (V): 7.08
- B
- Right ascension: 07^{h} 35^{m} 22.036^{s}
- Declination: −74° 16′ 30.96″
- Apparent magnitude (V): 7.02

Characteristics

A
- Evolutionary stage: main sequence
- Spectral type: B9IV

B
- Evolutionary stage: main sequence
- Spectral type: B9IV

Astrometry
Absolute magnitude (M_{V})	−1.35

A
Radial velocity (R_{v})	+13.0 km/s
Proper motion (μ)	RA: −2.527±0.040 mas/yr Dec.: 21.791±0.033 mas/yr
Parallax (π)	3.9430±0.0292 mas
Distance	827 ± 6 ly (254 ± 2 pc)

B
Radial velocity (R_{v})	+10.8 km/s
Proper motion (μ)	RA: −3.650±0.032 mas/yr Dec.: 18.164±0.034 mas/yr
Parallax (π)	3.9907±0.0274 mas
Distance	817 ± 6 ly (251 ± 2 pc)

Details

A
Mass	3.5 M_{☉}
Radius	3.6 R_{☉}
Luminosity	582 L_{☉}
Surface gravity (log g)	3.96 cgs
Temperature	13,005 K
Metallicity [Fe/H]	−0.15 dex
Rotational velocity (v sin i)	17 km/s

B
Mass	3.4 M_{☉}
Surface gravity (log g)	3.93 cgs
Temperature	12,640 K
Metallicity [Fe/H]	−0.15 dex

Other designations
- CD−73°375, HIP 36914, WDS J07354-7417
- A: HD 62153, HR 2979
- B: HD 62154, HR 2980

Database references
SIMBAD	data
- A
- B

CD−73°375 is a binary star located in the constellation Volans about 820 light years away. The two components, HR 2979 and HR 2980, are separated by two arc-seconds. The pair has a combined apparent magnitude of 6.34. It has a radial velocity of about 13 km/s, which means it is drifting away from the Solar System.

== Properties ==
The two stars making up CD−73°375 are both B9 subgiants with almost identical properties. HR 2979 is generally designated as the primary because of its higher mass, although HR 2980 is marginally brighter at magnitude 7.02. They are 1.9″ apart and have an assumed orbit of 3,760 years.

Each star has a mass about three and a half times the Sun's and a temperature of about 13,000 K.
