= HD 75116 =

Star in the constellation of Volans

Observation data Epoch J2000 Equinox J2000
- Constellation: Volans
- Right ascension: 08^{h} 43^{m} 54.32871^{s}
- Declination: −68° 12′ 41.7018″
- Apparent magnitude (V): 6.31±0.01

Characteristics
- Evolutionary stage: red giant branch
- Spectral type: K3 III:
- U−B color index: +1.78
- B−V color index: +1.50

Astrometry
Radial velocity (R_{v})	−17.5±0.4 km/s
Proper motion (μ)	RA: +1.359 mas/yr Dec.: +25.545 mas/yr
Parallax (π)	3.5061±0.0178 mas
Distance	930 ± 5 ly (285 ± 1 pc)
Absolute magnitude (M_{V})	−0.93

Details
Mass	2.29±0.11 M_{☉}
Radius	52.2 R_{☉}
Luminosity	431±7 L_{☉}
Surface gravity (log g)	1.08 cgs
Temperature	4,124±122 K
Rotational velocity (v sin i)	<1 km/s

Other designations
- 40 G. Volantis, CD−67°666, CPD−67°990, GC 12074, HD 75116, HIP 42850, HR 3491, SAO 250315

Database references
SIMBAD	data

HD 75116, also known as HR 3491, is a solitary, orange hued star in the southern circumpolar constellation Volans, the flying fish. It has an apparent magnitude of 6.31, placing it near the limit for naked eye visibility. Parallax measurements from the Gaia spacecraft place the star relatively far at a distance of 930 light years. It appears to be approaching the Solar System, having a heliocentric radial velocity of −17.5 km/s.

This is a red giant with a spectral classification of K3 III:, but there is uncertainty behind the class. Gaia Data Release 3 stellar evolution models place it on the red giant branch. It has 2.29 times the Sun’s mass but has expanded to 52.2 times its girth. HD 75116 radiates 431 times the luminosity of the Sun from its swollen photosphere at an effective temperature of 4,124 K. It rotates slowly like many giant stars, having a projected rotational velocity <1 km/s.
