= HD 72337 =

Star in the constellation Volans

Observation data Epoch J2000 Equinox ICRS
- Constellation: Volans
- Right ascension: 08^{h} 27^{m} 16.7555^{s}
- Declination: −70° 05′ 36.541″
- Apparent magnitude (V): 5.51±0.01

Characteristics
- Evolutionary stage: main sequence
- Spectral type: A0 V
- U−B color index: −0.04
- B−V color index: −0.03

Astrometry
Radial velocity (R_{v})	13±7.4 km/s
Proper motion (μ)	RA: −18.630 mas/yr Dec.: +45.723 mas/yr
Parallax (π)	11.3465±0.0387 mas
Distance	287.5 ± 1.0 ly (88.1 ± 0.3 pc)
Absolute magnitude (M_{V})	+0.85

Details
Mass	2.51±0.07 M_{☉}
Radius	2.26±0.06 R_{☉}
Luminosity	42.5 L_{☉}
Surface gravity (log g)	4.15 cgs
Temperature	10,251±384 K
Rotational velocity (v sin i)	149 km/s
Age	265 Myr

Other designations
- 30 G. Volantis, CPD−69°919, GC 11620, HD 72337, HIP 41451, HR 3370, SAO 250235

Database references
SIMBAD	data

HD 72337, also known as HR 3370, is a solitary, bluish-white hued star located in the southern constellation Volans. With an apparent magnitude of 5.51, it is faintly visible to the unaided eye but only under ideal conditions.

== Velocity ==
Based on recent parallax measurements from the Gaia spacecraft, HD 72337 is currently located at a distance of 287 light years. The object made its closest approach 1.914 million years ago when it was 234 light years distant. At that distance, it brightened slightly to an apparent magnitude of 5.13. Currently, HR 3370 is receding with a heliocentric radial velocity of 10.7 km/s.

== Properties ==
The stellar classification of HD 72337 is A0 V, indicating that it is an ordinary A-type main-sequence star. It has 2.25 times the radius of the Sun and a mass of 2.51 M_{☉}. It radiates at 42.5 times the luminosity of the Sun from its photosphere at an effective temperature of 10,251 K. Like many hot stars, HD 72337 rotates rapidly with a projected rotational velocity of 149 km/s, and is estimated to be 265 million years old.
