= HD 66920 =

Star in the constellation Volans

Observation data Epoch J2000 Equinox ICRS
- Constellation: Volans
- Right ascension: 07^{h} 59^{m} 15.7648^{s}
- Declination: −73° 14′ 39.016″
- Apparent magnitude (V): 6.33±0.01

Characteristics
- Evolutionary stage: main sequence
- Spectral type: A3 V
- U−B color index: +0.13
- B−V color index: +0.14

Astrometry
Radial velocity (R_{v})	23.8±1.7 km/s
Proper motion (μ)	RA: −5.984 mas/yr Dec.: −20.295 mas/yr
Parallax (π)	7.6204±0.0251 mas
Distance	428 ± 1 ly (131.2 ± 0.4 pc)
Absolute magnitude (M_{V})	+0.76

Details
Mass	2.33 M_{☉}
Radius	3.53+0.13 −0.11 R_{☉}
Luminosity	42±2 L_{☉}
Surface gravity (log g)	3.65±0.08 cgs
Temperature	8,247±95 K
Metallicity [Fe/H]	−0.01 dex
Age	711 Myr

Other designations
- 20 G. Volantis, CD−72°431, CPD−72°654, GC 10898, HD 66920, HIP 39041, HR 3171, SAO 256463

Database references
SIMBAD	data

HD 66920, also known as HR 3171, is a solitary, white hued star located in the southern circumpolar constellation Volans, the flying fish. It has an apparent magnitude of 6.33, placing it near the limit for naked eye visibility. Based on parallax measurements from the Gaia spacecraft, the star is estimated to be 428 light years distant. It appears to be receding from the Solar System, having a heliocentric radial velocity of 23.8 km/s. Pauzen et al. (2001) listed it as a λ Boötis star, but is now considered a non member.

HD 66920 has a classification of A3 V, indicating that it is an ordinary A-type main-sequence star. Although it has been classified as a giant star (III), HR 3171 is still on the main sequence (according to Gaia DR3 models). It has 2.33 times the mass of the Sun and an enlarged radius of 3.53 R_{☉}. It radiates 42 times the luminosity of the Sun from its enlarged photosphere at an effective temperature of 8,247 K. HD 66920 has a solar metallicity, and is estimated to be 711 million years old.
