= HD 53501 =

Star in the constellation Volans

Observation data Epoch J2000.0 Equinox ICRS
- Constellation: Volans
- Right ascension: 06^{h} 59^{m} 50.53507^{s}
- Declination: −67° 54′ 59.2003″
- Apparent magnitude (V): +5.18

Characteristics
- Evolutionary stage: red giant branch
- Spectral type: K3 III
- U−B color index: +1.65
- B−V color index: +1.40

Astrometry
Radial velocity (R_{v})	38.6±0.8 km/s
Proper motion (μ)	RA: −27.467 mas/yr Dec.: +233.796 mas/yr
Parallax (π)	10.5936±0.0689 mas
Distance	308 ± 2 ly (94.4 ± 0.6 pc)
Absolute magnitude (M_{V})	+0.42

Details
Mass	1.39±0.40 M_{☉}
Radius	19.95^{+1.43}_{−1.33} R_{☉}
Luminosity	126±2 L_{☉}
Surface gravity (log g)	1.98±0.29 cgs
Temperature	4,169^{+97}_{−95} K
Metallicity [Fe/H]	0.00 dex
Rotational velocity (v sin i)	1.5±1.2 km/s

Other designations
- 6 G. Volantis, CD−67°492, CPD−67°686, GC 9280, GJ 3422, HD 53501, HIP 33682, HR 2662, SAO 249704

Database references
SIMBAD	data

HD 53501 (HR 2662; Gliese 3422), is a solitary star in the southern circumpolar constellation Volans. It has an apparent magnitude of 5.18, allowing it to be seen with the naked eye under ideal conditions. The object is located at a distance of 308 light years but is receding with a heliocentric radial velocity of 39 km/s.

HD 53501 has a stellar classification of K3 III, indicating that it is a red giant. It has 139% the mass of the Sun and an enlarged radius of 20 R_{☉}. It radiates at 126 times the luminosity of the Sun from its photosphere at an effective temperature of 4,169 K, giving it an orange glow. HD 53501 has a solar metallicity and spins with a projected rotational velocity of about 1.5 km/s.

This star is considered to be a probable member of the 61 Cygni moving group, a group of high velocity stars that share a common motion with 61 Cygni.
