= HD 59640 =

Suspected eruptive variable in the constellation Volans

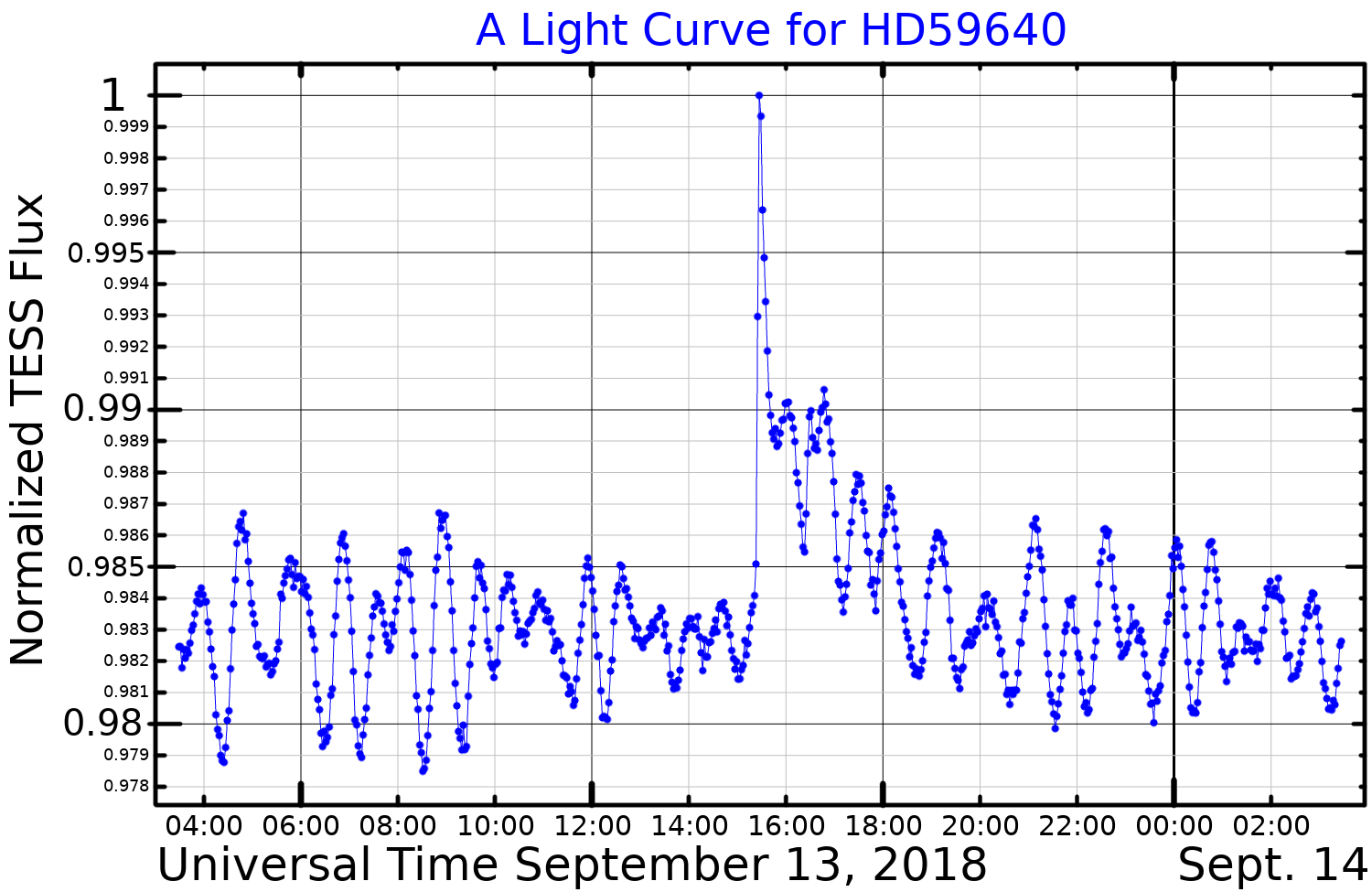
- A light curve for HD 59640, plotted from TESS data, showing a flare whose flux peaked at UT 15:27.

Observation data Epoch J2000.0 Equinox ICRS
- Constellation: Volans
- Right ascension: 07^{h} 24^{m} 37.12530^{s}
- Declination: −71° 28′ 14.3716″
- Apparent magnitude (V): 6.48±0.01

Characteristics
- Spectral type: A3 V
- U−B color index: +0.08
- B−V color index: +0.12
- Variable type: suspected

Astrometry
Radial velocity (R_{v})	18.4±0.4 km/s
Proper motion (μ)	RA: +7.272 mas/yr Dec.: +42.576 mas/yr
Parallax (π)	12.4367±0.0357 mas
Distance	262.3 ± 0.8 ly (80.4 ± 0.2 pc)
Absolute magnitude (M_{V})	+1.91

Details
Mass	1.82±0.07 M_{☉}
Radius	1.77±0.09 R_{☉}
Luminosity	13.67 L_{☉}
Surface gravity (log g)	4.28±0.07 cgs
Temperature	8,466±125 K
Metallicity [Fe/H]	−0.20 dex
Rotation	42.9 min

Other designations
- 11 G. Volantis, CD−71°402, CPD−71°574, GC 9967, HD 59640, HIP 35946, SAO 256408

Database references
SIMBAD	data

HD 59640 is a solitary white hued star located in the southern circumpolar constellation Volans. It has an apparent magnitude of 6.48, placing it near the limit for naked eye visibility. Gaia DR3 parallax measurements place the object at a distance of 262 light years and it is receding with a heliocentric radial velocity of 18.4 km/s. At its current distance, HD 59640's brightness is diminished by three tenths of a magnitude due to interstellar dust.

This is an ordinary A-type main-sequence star with a stellar classification of A3 V. It has 1.82 times the mass of the Sun and 1.77 times its radius. It radiates 13.7 times the luminosity of the Sun from its photosphere at an effective temperature of 8,466 K. HD 59640 has an iron abundance 63% that of the Sun, making it metal deficient. In 2020, Maximillian N. Günther and colleagues found the object to be an eruptive variable star with flares lasting up to 10 minutes. However, they are rather small, with the maximum being only two hundredths of a magnitude.
