= NGC 2442 and NGC 2443 =

Galaxy in the constellation Volans

NGC 2442 / 2443
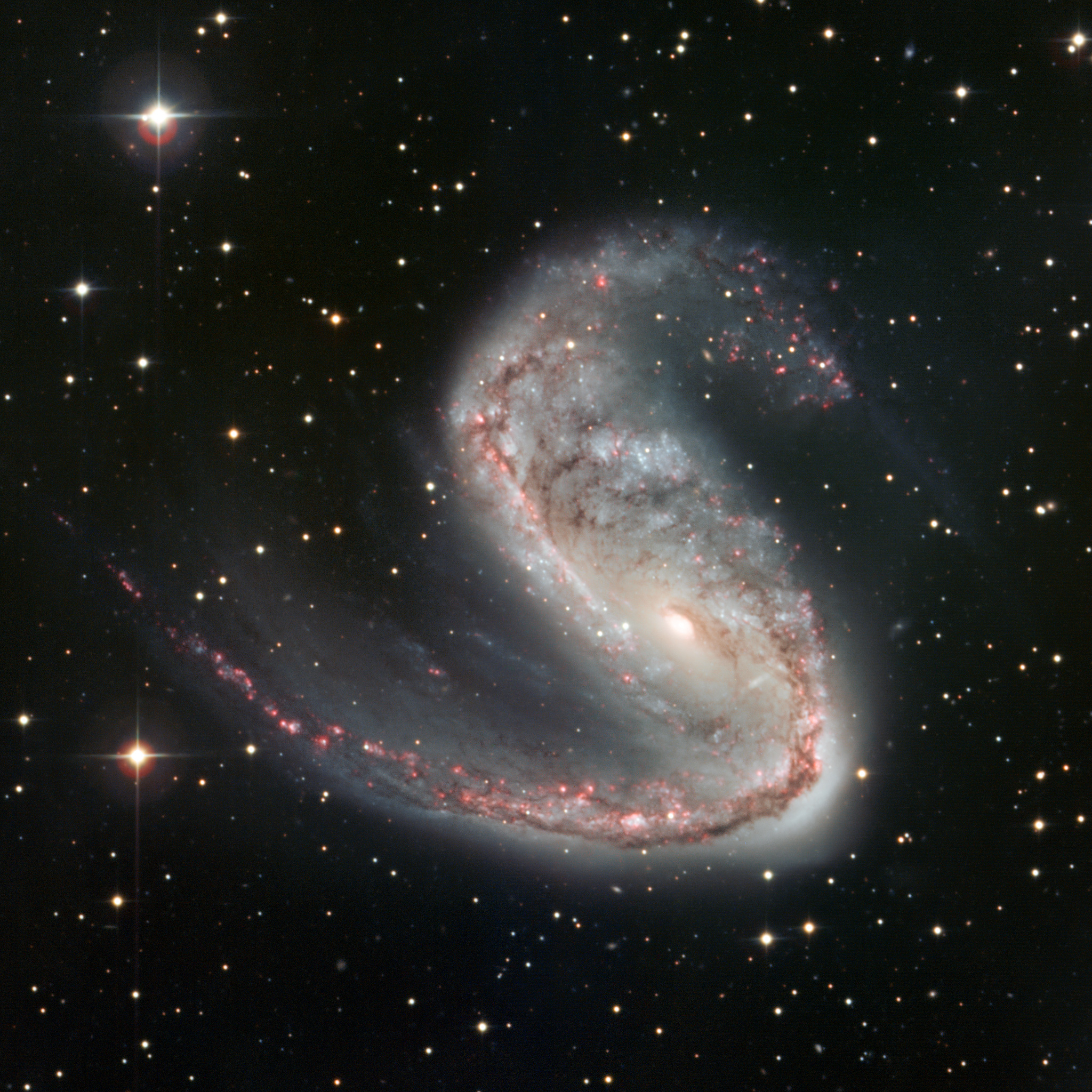
- NGC 2442 (upper spiral structure) and NGC 2443 (lower horizontal spiral arm)

Observation data (J2000 epoch)
- Constellation: Volans
- Right ascension: 07^{h} 36^{m} 23.8^{s}
- Declination: −69° 31′ 51″
- Redshift: 1466 ± 5 km/s
- Apparent magnitude (V): 11.2

Characteristics
- Type: SAB(s)bc pec
- Size: ~160,000 ly (48.94 kpc) (estimated)
- Apparent size (V): 5′.5 × 4′.9
- Notable features: SW part is NGC 2442 while NE part is NGC 2443

Other designations
- PGC 21373

NGC 2442 and NGC 2443 are two parts of a single intermediate spiral galaxy, commonly known as the Meathook Galaxy or the Cobra and Mouse. It is about 50 million light-years away in the constellation Volans. It was discovered by Sir John Herschel on December 23, 1834 during his survey of southern skies with a 18.25 inch diameter reflecting telescope (his "20-foot telescope") from an observatory he set up in Cape Town, South Africa. Associated with this galaxy is HIPASS J0731-69, a cloud of gas devoid of any stars. It is likely that the cloud was torn loose from NGC 2442 by a companion.

When John Louis Emil Dreyer compiled the New General Catalogue of Nebulae and Clusters of Stars he used William Herschel's earlier observations that described two objects in a "double nebula", giving the northern most the designation NGC 2443 and the southernmost most the designation NGC 2442. Herschel's later observations noted that the two objects were actually a single large nebula.

It is part of a galaxy group known as LGG 147. It has at least 5 members, NGC 2397, NGC 2434, NGC 2442, NGC 2443 and PGC 20690.

== Supernovae ==
Three, or perhaps four, supernovae have been observed in NGC 2442:

- SN 1999ga (Type II, mag. 18) was discovered by the Perth Astronomical Research Group on 19 November 1999.
- SN 2015F (Type Ia, mag. 16.8) was discovered by Berto Monard on 9 March 2015. It reached magnitude 12.9, making it the brightest supernova of 2015.
- Gaia16cfr, also known as AT 2016jbu, was a supernova imposter that was discovered in NGC 2442 on 1 December 2016. It reached a Gaia apparent magnitude of 19.3 and absolute magnitude of about −12. However, a paper published in August 2022 suggested that this was a genuine, but strange, supernova.
- SN 2026etu (Type Ia, mag. 18.547) was discovered by ATLAS on 1 March 2026.
