= HD 75171 =

Star in the constellation of Volans

Observation data Epoch J2000.0 Equinox ICRS
- Constellation: Volans
- Right ascension: 08^{h} 44^{m} 29.9582^{s}
- Declination: −65° 49′ 31.550″
- Apparent magnitude (V): 6.02±0.01

Characteristics
- Evolutionary stage: main sequence
- Spectral type: A4 V
- U−B color index: +0.08
- B−V color index: +0.20

Astrometry
Radial velocity (R_{v})	10.7±0.5 km/s
Proper motion (μ)	RA: −63.156 mas/yr Dec.: +103.462 mas/yr
Parallax (π)	17.0428±0.0235 mas
Distance	191.4 ± 0.3 ly (58.68 ± 0.08 pc)
Absolute magnitude (M_{V})	+2.19

Details
Mass	1.81 M_{☉}
Radius	1.84±0.05 R_{☉}
Luminosity	11.7±0.4 L_{☉}
Surface gravity (log g)	4.33 cgs
Temperature	7,998±272 K
Metallicity [Fe/H]	−0.06 dex
Rotational velocity (v sin i)	96±1 km/s
Age	630 Myr

Other designations
- 41 G. Volantis, CPD−65°1013, FK5 2691, GC 12090, HD 75171, HIP 42895, HR 3495, SAO 250317

Database references
SIMBAD	data

HD 75171, also known as HR 3495, is a solitary, white hued star located in the southern constellation of Volans. It has an apparent magnitude of 6.02, making it faintly visible to the naked eye under ideal conditions. The object is relatively close at a distance of 191 light years but is receding with a heliocentric radial velocity of 10.7 km/s. Eggen (1995) lists it as a probable member of the Hyades Supercluster.

HD 75171 has a stellar classification of A4 V, indicating that it is an ordinary A-type main-sequence star. It has also been given a cooler class of A9 V. It has 1.81 times the mass of the Sun and a diameter of 1.84 R_{☉}. It radiates at 12 times the luminosity of the Sun from its photosphere at an effective temperature of 7,998 K. Like most hot stars, it spins quickly with a projected rotational velocity of 96 km/s. HD 75171 is estimated to be 630 million years old, well around the age of the actual Hyades cluster. Zorec and Royer (2012) model it to be a dwarf star 50.4% through its main sequence lifetime, and Gaia Data Release 3 models also show a star roughly halfway through its main sequence life. The star has a near solar metallicity, with the iron abundance being 87% that of the Sun.
