= HD 63513 =

Star in the constellation Volans

Observation data Epoch J2000.0 Equinox J2000.0 (ICRS)
- Constellation: Volans
- Right ascension: 07^{h} 44^{m} 43.8535^{s}
- Declination: −66° 04′ 18.954″
- Apparent magnitude (V): 6.38 ± 0.01

Characteristics
- Evolutionary stage: red giant branch
- Spectral type: G6/8 III
- U−B color index: +0.66
- B−V color index: +0.95

Astrometry
Radial velocity (R_{v})	1.4 ± 0.4 km/s
Proper motion (μ)	RA: −16.880 mas/yr Dec.: +48.274 mas/yr
Parallax (π)	5.1439±0.0162 mas
Distance	634 ± 2 ly (194.4 ± 0.6 pc)
Absolute magnitude (M_{V})	−0.06

Details
Mass	3.14 ± 0.10 M_{☉}
Radius	12.87 ± 0.22 R_{☉}
Luminosity	102 ± 2 L_{☉}
Surface gravity (log g)	2.83 ± 0.11 cgs
Temperature	5116 ± 35 K
Metallicity [Fe/H]	+0.01 ± 0.03 dex
Rotational velocity (v sin i)	1.9 ± 1.5 km/s

Other designations
- 17 G. Volantis, CD−65°568, CPD−65°806, GC 10487, HD 63513, HIP 37773, HR 3036, SAO 249944

Database references
SIMBAD	data

HD 63513 (HR 3036) is a solitary star located in the southern circumpolar constellation Volans. It has an apparent magnitude of 6.38, placing it near the max naked eye visibility. The star is situated at a distance of 634 light years but is receding with a heliocentric radial velocity of 1.4 km/s.

This object is a star with the characteristics of a G6 and G8 giant. At present it has 3.14 times the mass of the Sun but has expanded to almost 13 times the Sun's girth. It shines at 102 solar luminosities from its enlarged photosphere at an effective temperature of 5,116 K, which gives it a yellow glow. HD 63513 has an iron abundance 102% that of the Sun, placing it at solar metallicity and spins modestly with a projected rotational velocity of 1.9 km/s.
