= HD 76270 =

Star in the constellation of Volans

Observation data Epoch J2000.0 Equinox J2000.0 (ICRS)
- Constellation: Volans
- Right ascension: 08^{h} 49^{m} 50.12604^{s}
- Declination: −72° 33′ 04.4601″
- Apparent magnitude (V): 6.10±0.01

Characteristics
- Spectral type: A5 III/IV
- U−B color index: +0.17
- B−V color index: +0.20

Astrometry
Radial velocity (R_{v})	−2.6±1.1 km/s
Proper motion (μ)	RA: −6.191 mas/yr Dec.: +8.368 mas/yr
Parallax (π)	1.3842±0.0201 mas
Distance	2,360 ± 30 ly (720 ± 10 pc)

Details
Mass	5.3 M_{☉}
Radius	22.9 R_{☉}
Luminosity	1,464±55 L_{☉}
Surface gravity (log g)	2.27 cgs
Temperature	8,121±123 K
Metallicity [Fe/H]	−0.44 dex

Other designations
- 44 G. Volantis, CD−72°488, CPD−72°747, GC 12252, HD 76720, HIP 35541, HR 3544, SAO 256556

Database references
SIMBAD	data

HD 76270, also known as HR 3544, is a solitary, white hued star located in the southern circumpolar constellation Volans. It has an apparent magnitude of 6.10, making it faintly visible to the naked eye if viewed under ideal conditions. The object is relatively far with a distance of 2,360 light years, but is slowly approaching the Solar System with a heliocentric radial velocity of −2.6 km/s.

HD 76270 was considered as a chemically peculiar Am star, and as a result, was given a spectral classification of A3mA6-7 by Nancy Houk and A.P Cowley. This means it is an A3 star with the metallic lines of a star with a class of A6-7. However, this peculiarity is now considered doubtful. An alternate class of A5 III/IV was given, instead making it an evolved A-type star with a blended luminosity class of a subgiant and a giant star.

At present it has 5.3 times the mass of the Sun but has expanded to 22.9 times its girth. It shines with a high luminosity of 1,464 L_{☉} from its enlarged photosphere at an effective temperature of 8,121 K. HR 3544 is metal deficient, having an iron abundance 64% below solar levels. A 1984 study used HD 76270 as a comparison star and suspected it of being slightly variable, but this has not been confirmed and it is not even listed as a suspected variable in the General Catalogue of Variable Stars.
