= Epsilon Volantis =

Multiple star in the constellation Volans

ε Volantis
- Location of ε Volantis (circled)

Observation data Epoch J2000.0 Equinox ICRS
- Constellation: Volans
- Right ascension: 08^{h} 07^{m} 55.7945^{s}
- Declination: −68° 37′ 01.433″
- Apparent magnitude (V): +4.33

Characteristics
- Spectral type: B5 III (B6 IV + B8 + A2 V + A2 V)
- B−V color index: −0.12

Astrometry
Radial velocity (R_{v})	+9.6 km/s
Proper motion (μ)	RA: −29.781(166) mas/yr Dec.: 29.887(177) mas/yr
Parallax (π)	5.0597±0.1248 mas
Distance	640 ± 20 ly (198 ± 5 pc)
Absolute magnitude (M_{V})	−1.82

Details

ε Vol Aa
Surface gravity (log g)	3.62 cgs
Temperature	14,348 K
Rotational velocity (v sin i)	1 km/s

ε Vol Ab
Surface gravity (log g)	4.07 cgs
Temperature	10,772 K
Rotational velocity (v sin i)	7 km/s

Other designations
- ε Vol, CPD−68°736, HD 68520, HIP 39794, HR 3223, SAO 250128, WDS J08079–6837

Database references
SIMBAD	data

Epsilon Volantis, Latinized from ε Volantis, is a quadruple star system in the southern constellation Volans. This star is at the center of the constellation of Volans and connects the "wings" of the constellation. Based upon parallax measurements, is roughly 640 light years from Earth.

The primary component, Epsilon Volantis A, is a spectroscopic binary. It is classified a blue-white B-type giant star and has an apparent magnitude of +4.35. (The individual components are classified as B6IV and B8.) The binary system has an orbital period of 14.1683 days. The binary's companion, Epsilon Volantis B, is 6.05 arcseconds away and has an apparent magnitude of +8.1. It too is a spectroscopic binary, consisting of two A-type main sequence stars with stellar classifications of A2 V and an orbital period of "a few days".
