= Gliese 293 =

Star in the constellation Volans

- Location of Gliese 293 in the constellation Volans

Observation data Epoch J2000.0 Equinox ICRS
- Constellation: Volans
- Right ascension: 07^{h} 53^{m} 08.1439^{s}
- Declination: −67° 47′ 31.382″
- Apparent magnitude (V): 13.96

Characteristics
- Evolutionary stage: white dwarf
- Spectral type: DC8.8, or DC10.3
- Apparent magnitude (B): 14.75
- Apparent magnitude (R_{KC}): 13.58
- Apparent magnitude (I_{KC}): 13.20
- Apparent magnitude (J): 12.726±0.023
- Apparent magnitude (H): 12.476±0.026
- Apparent magnitude (K_{S}): 12.362±0.024

Astrometry
Proper motion (μ)	RA: 1,467.123 mas/yr Dec.: −1,489.721 mas/yr
Parallax (π)	122.4130±0.0114 mas
Distance	26.644 ± 0.002 ly (8.1691 ± 0.0008 pc)
Absolute magnitude (M_{V})	14.47±0.04

Details
Mass	0.59±0.01 M_{☉}
Radius	0.0128 (Note: From surface gravity and mass.) R_{☉}
Surface gravity (log g)	8.00±0.02 cgs
Temperature	5,700±90 K
Age	2.65±0.10 (Note: White dwarf cooling age, i.e. age as degenerate star (not including lifetime as main-sequence star and as giant star)) Gyr

Other designations
- GJ 293, EGGR 56, L 97-12, LAWD 26, LFT 555, LHS 34, LTT 2981, PLX 1882, WD 0752-676, 2MASS J07530814-6747314

Database references
SIMBAD	data

Gliese 293 (or WD 0752-676, or LHS 34, or L 97-12) is a nearby white dwarf star, located 26.64 light-years away in the constellation Volans. It is the nearest star in this constellation and also the only one within 10 parsecs.

== Distance ==
Gliese 293 is the 12th-nearest known white dwarf. A trigonometric parallax of Gliese 293 was included in the YPC (Yale Parallax Catalog), and subsequently it was measured more precisely in CTIOPI (Cerro Tololo Inter-American Observatory (CTIO) Parallax Investigation) 0.9 m telescope program, and by Gaia.

Gliese 293 parallax measurements
Source	Paper	Parallax, mas	Distance, pc	Distance, ly	Ref.
YPC	van Altena et al., 1995	141.2±8.4	7.08±0.42	23.10±1.37	
CTIOPI 0.9 m	TSN-21 (Subasavage et al., 2009)	126.25±1.34	7.92±0.08	25.83±0.27	
Gaia DR3	Gaia Collaboration 2023	122.4130±0.0114	8.1691±0.0008	26.644±0.002	

== Physical parameters ==
The mass of Gliese 293 is 0.59±0.01 Solar masses, and its surface gravity is 10^{8.00±0.02} cm/s^{2}, or approximately 102,000 times Earth's, corresponding to a radius of 8,887 kilometres (5,522 miles), or 139% of Earth's.

Gliese 293 has a temperature of 5,700±90 K, almost like the Sun, and a cooling age, i.e. age as a degenerate star (not including its lifetime as a main-sequence star and a giant star) of 2.65±0.10 Gyr It has a white appearance due to similar temperature to Sun.

== See also ==
- List of star systems within 25–30 light-years
