= Alpha Volantis =

Binary star system in the constellation Volans

α Volantis
- Location of α Volantis (circled)

Observation data Epoch J2000.0 Equinox J2000.0
- Constellation: Volans
- Right ascension: 09^{h} 02^{m} 26.79592^{s}
- Declination: −66° 23′ 45.8727″
- Apparent magnitude (V): +4.00

Characteristics
- Evolutionary stage: main sequence
- Spectral type: kA3hA5mA5 V
- U−B color index: +0.13
- B−V color index: +0.14

Astrometry
Radial velocity (R_{v})	+4.9 km/s
Proper motion (μ)	RA: −2.00 mas/yr Dec.: +95.51 mas/yr
Parallax (π)	26.11±0.12 mas
Distance	124.9 ± 0.6 ly (38.3 ± 0.2 pc)
Absolute magnitude (M_{V})	+1.08

Orbit
Period (P)	0.652±0.001 yr
Semi-major axis (a)	0.0321±0.0013″
Eccentricity (e)	0.041±0.038
Inclination (i)	101.9±2.3°
Longitude of the node (Ω)	105.3±1.4°
Periastron epoch (T)	2015.593±0.063
Argument of periastron (ω) (secondary)	248.5±34.2°

Details
Mass	1.87 M_{☉}
Radius	2.64 R_{☉}
Luminosity	29 L_{☉}
Surface gravity (log g)	3.90 cgs
Temperature	8,198 K
Metallicity [Fe/H]	+0.19 dex
Rotational velocity (v sin i)	30.6±0.4 km/s
Age	427+183 −377 Myr

Other designations
- CPD−65°1065, FK5 343, GJ 333.3, GJ 9284, HD 78045, HIP 44382, HR 3615, SAO 250422

Database references
SIMBAD	data

Alpha Volantis (Alpha Vol), Latinized from α Volantis, is a binary star system located in the southern constellation Volans. It has an apparent visual magnitude of +4.00, which is bright enough to be seen with the naked eye. Based upon parallax measurements made with the Hipparcos spacecraft, it is located at a distance of 125 light years from the Sun. As of 2010, the two components of this system had an angular separation of 0.0318″ along a position angle of 286.9°. The magnitude difference between the two components is 0.1. It is considered a member of the Sirius supercluster.

The primary component is an Am star with a stellar classification of kA3hA5mA5 V. This notation indicates the star has the weak calcium II K-line of an A3 star, and the hydrogen and metallic lines of an A5 star. It has an estimated age of 427 million years. In 1992, it was found to be emitting an infrared excess, suggesting the presence of a circumstellar disk of dust. However, subsequent observations have not confirmed this.
