= Zeta Volantis =

Binary star in the constellation Volans

ζ Volantis
- Location of ζ Volantis

Observation data Epoch J2000.0 Equinox ICRS
- Constellation: Volans
- Right ascension: 07^{h} 41^{m} 49.2590^{s}
- Declination: −72° 36′ 21.957″
- Apparent magnitude (V): 3.918±0.003

Characteristics
- Evolutionary stage: red giant branch
- Spectral type: K0 III
- B−V color index: 1.029±0.004

Astrometry
Radial velocity (R_{v})	48.5±0.14 km/s
Proper motion (μ)	RA: +36.179 mas/yr Dec.: +14.816 mas/yr
Parallax (π)	22.4377±0.0947 mas
Distance	145.4 ± 0.6 ly (44.6 ± 0.2 pc)
Absolute magnitude (M_{V})	+0.75

Details
Mass	1.224±0.155 M_{☉}
Radius	10.677±0.255 R_{☉}
Luminosity	60 L_{☉}
Surface gravity (log g)	2.82±0.09 cgs
Temperature	4,788±37 K
Metallicity [Fe/H]	−0.17±0.03 dex
Age	5.1±1.515 Gyr

Other designations
- ζ Vol, CPD−72°627, FK5 297, HD 63295, HIP 37504, HR 3024, SAO 256438

Database references
SIMBAD	data

Zeta Volantis, Latinized from ζ Volantis, is a binary star system in the southern constellation of Volans. It has an apparent visual magnitude of 3.92, which is bright enough to be seen with the naked eye. Based upon parallax measurements by the Gaia spacecraft, it is approximately 145 light-years (44.6 parsecs) from the Sun. The companion is a magnitude 9.7 star at an angular separation of 16.7″. Based upon their motion through space, this system made its perihelion passage some 858,000 years ago when it came within 22 ly (6.6 pc) of the Sun. It is currently moving away with a radial velocity of 48 km/s.

The primary component is K-type giant star with a stellar classification of K0 III. It has a derived luminosity of around 60 times that of the Sun, 1.2 times the Sun's mass and is about 5.1 billion years old. At this age, it has expanded to 10.7 times the Sun's size. The expanded outer envelope has an effective temperature of 4,788 K, giving it the orange glow of a K-type star.
