= R Volantis =

Carbon star in the constellation Volans

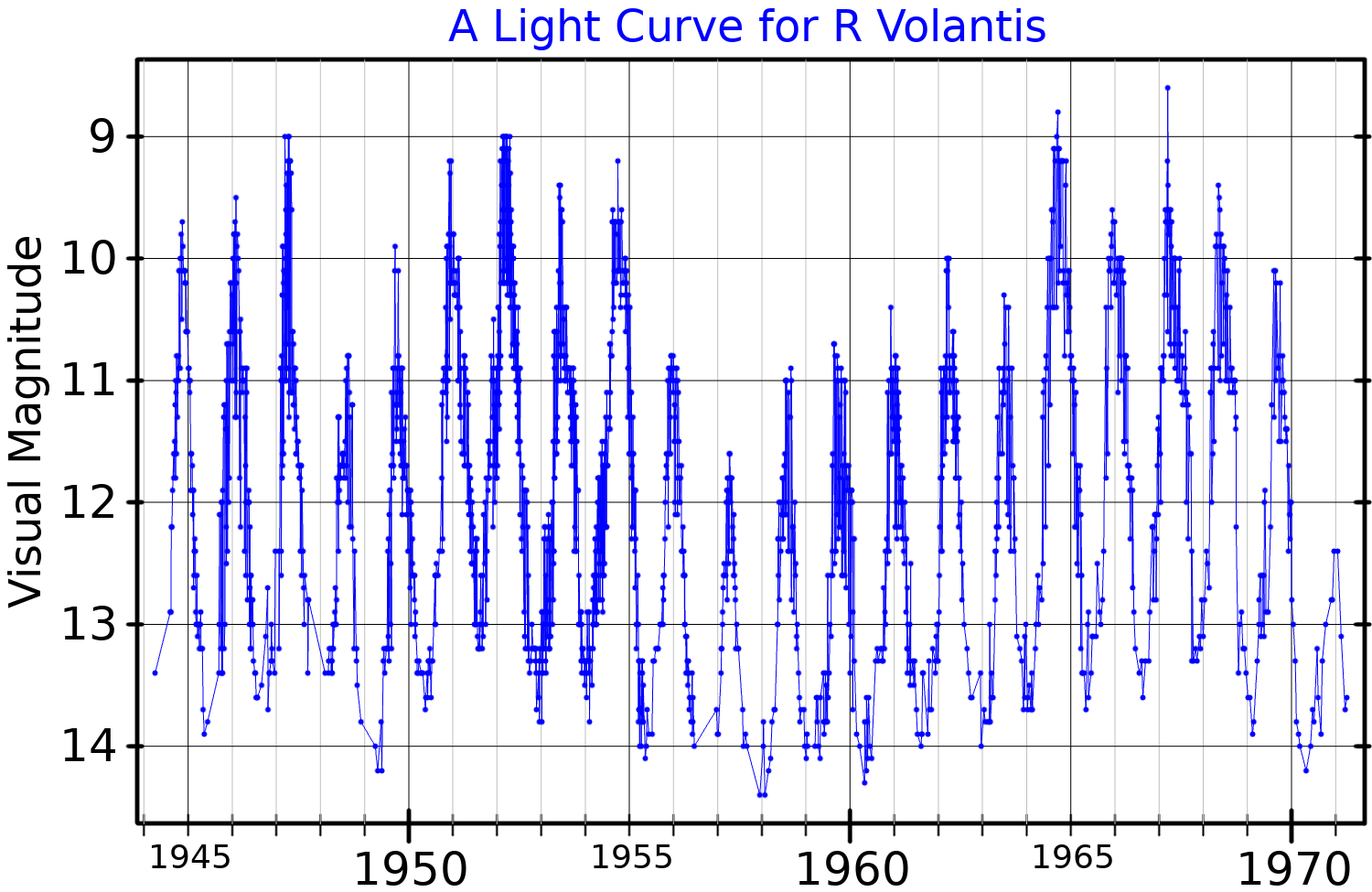
- A visual band light curve for R Volantis, plotted from AAVSO data

Observation data Epoch J2000.0 Equinox J2000.0 (ICRS)
- Constellation: Volans
- Right ascension: 07^{h} 05^{m} 36.2081^{s}
- Declination: −73° 00′ 52.034″
- Apparent magnitude (V): 8.78 - 11.50

Characteristics
- Evolutionary stage: AGB
- Spectral type: Ce
- Variable type: Mira

Astrometry
Radial velocity (R_{v})	−4.7 km/s
Proper motion (μ)	RA: −14.298 mas/yr Dec.: +19.462 mas/yr
Parallax (π)	1.3931±0.0631 mas
Distance	2,317+97 −96 ly (710.7+29.9 −29.5 pc)

Details
Mass	0.75 M_{☉}
Radius	360 (Note: Applying the Stefan–Boltzmann law with a nominal solar effective temperature of 5,772 K: $$\sqrt{\biggl(\frac{5,772}{3,140}\biggr)^4 \cdot 11,438} = 360\ R_\odot$$.) R_{☉}
Luminosity	11,438 L_{☉}
Temperature	3,140 K

Other designations
- R Vol, CD−72°378, 2MASS J07053619-7300519

Database references
SIMBAD	data

R Volantis is a single variable star in the southern circumpolar constellation Volans. It has an apparent magnitude of around 8.7 at its maxima, making it readily visible in amateur telescopes but not to the naked eye. At its minimum brightness, it may be as faint as magnitude 13.9. The object is relatively far at a distance of about 2,300 light years but is drifting closer with a radial velocity of −5 km/s.

R Volantis was discovered at Cape Observatory in 1899. The star's peculiarity was first observed in 1954 when it was found to have emission lines in its spectrum. Observations from 1955 to 1967 revealed that the star was a probable Mira variable and was given its current designation. However, its nature as a carbon star wasn't discovered until 1968 by Pik-Sin The. In their paper, R Volantis and V1163 Centauri (HD 114586) had their spectra studied and the former is classified as a carbon star while the latter is an S-type star.

R Volantis has a stellar classification of Ce, indicating that it is a carbon star with emission lines. It is a giant star on the asymptotic giant branch, meaning that it is generating energy via hydrogen and helium shells around an inert carbon core. As a result, it has expanded to 360 times the radius of the Sun and now radiates a luminosity of 11,438 L_{☉}, with an effective temperature of around 3,100 K, giving it a red hue.

R Volantis fluctuates between magnitude 8.7 and 13.9, and has a period of 445 days.
