= Kappa Volantis =

Quadruple star system in the constellation Volans

κ Volantis
- Location of κ Volantis

Observation data Epoch J2000.0 Equinox ICRS
- Constellation: Volans
- κ^{1} Vol
- Right ascension: 08^{h} 19^{m} 48.96447^{s}
- Declination: −71° 30′ 53.6692″
- Apparent magnitude (V): 5.37
- κ^{2} Vol
- Right ascension: 08^{h} 20^{m} 00.52661^{s}
- Declination: −71° 30′ 19.3664″
- Apparent magnitude (V): 5.65

Characteristics

κ^{1} Vol
- Spectral type: B9III/IV
- U−B color index: −0.31
- B−V color index: −0.06

κ^{2} Vol
- Spectral type: B9/A0IV
- U−B color index: −0.31
- B−V color index: −0.10

Astrometry

κ^{1} Vol
Radial velocity (R_{v})	36.0 km/s
Proper motion (μ)	RA: −16.89 mas/yr Dec.: +36.26 mas/yr
Parallax (π)	7.50±0.35 mas
Distance	430 ± 20 ly (133 ± 6 pc)
Absolute magnitude (M_{V})	−0.29

κ^{2} Vol
Radial velocity (R_{v})	−6.50 km/s
Proper motion (μ)	RA: −17.71 mas/yr Dec.: +34.10 mas/yr
Parallax (π)	7.79±0.21 mas
Distance	420 ± 10 ly (128 ± 3 pc)
Absolute magnitude (M_{V})	+0.09

Details

κ^{1} Vol
Mass	2.7±0.3 M_{☉}
Radius	3.83±0.65 R_{☉}
Luminosity	129 L_{☉}
Surface gravity (log g)	3.77±0.09 cgs
Temperature	9,884 K
Metallicity [Fe/H]	−0.20+0.36 −0.25 dex
Rotational velocity (v sin i)	80 km/s

κ^{2} Vol
Mass	3.03 M_{☉}
Radius	3.01 R_{☉}
Luminosity	124 L_{☉}
Surface gravity (log g)	4.19 cgs
Temperature	11,682 K
Metallicity [Fe/H]	+0.69±0.15 dex
Rotation	1.29641 d
Rotational velocity (v sin i)	2 km/s
Age	120 Myr

Other designations
- κ Vol, WDS J08198-7131
- κ^{1} Vol: CPD−71°677, HD 71046, HIP 40817, HR 3301, SAO 256497
- κ^{2} Vol: CPD−71° 678, HD 71066, HIP 40834, HR 3302, SAO 256499.

Database references
SIMBAD	κ^{1} Vol
- κ^{2} Vol

Kappa Volantis, Latinized from κ Volantis, is a quadruple star system in the southern constellation of Volans. The primary component has an apparent visual magnitude of 5.37, while the secondary companion is magnitude 5.65; individually, both a bright enough to be faintly visible to the naked eye. Based upon parallax measurements, the stars appear to be around 420−430 light-years from the Sun.

== Properties ==
The brightest component, κ^{1} Volantis, is a blue-white B-type star with a stellar classification showing characteristics of a both a subgiant and giant star. It has an unseen companion, and the pair form a single-lined spectroscopic binary. The star has nearly three times the Sun's mass, and 3.8 times its radius. It radiates at 129 times the Sun's luminosity from its photosphere at an effective temperature of 9,884 K.

== Companion ==
Separated from κ^{1} Volantis by 65 arcseconds, κ^{2} Volantis is a white subgiant star that falls between a B-type and A-type classification. The system's fourth component, κ Volantis C, is a magnitude +8.5 star 37.7 arcseconds away from κ^{2} Volantis.
