= HD 76700 =

Star in the constellation Volans

Observation data Epoch J2000.0 Equinox ICRS
- Constellation: Volans
- Right ascension: 08^{h} 53^{m} 55.5161^{s}
- Declination: −66° 48′ 03.576″
- Apparent magnitude (V): 8.16

Characteristics
- Evolutionary stage: subgiant
- Spectral type: G6V
- B−V color index: 0.745±0.010

Astrometry
| Radial velocity (R_{v}) | +38.90±1.46 km/s |
| Proper motion (μ) | RA: −282.929(47) mas/yr Dec.: 120.479(43) mas/yr |
| Parallax (π) | 16.5671±0.0387 mas |
| Distance | 196.9 ± 0.5 ly (60.4 ± 0.1 pc) |
| Absolute magnitude (M_{V}) | 4.26 |

Details
| Mass | 1.10±0.02 M_{☉} |
| Radius | 1.34±0.03 R_{☉} |
| Luminosity | 1.69±0.01 L_{☉} |
| Surface gravity (log g) | 4.22±0.03 cgs |
| Temperature | 5,694±44 K |
| Metallicity [Fe/H] | +0.31±0.02 dex |
| Age | 6.9±0.8 Gyr |

Other designations
- CD−66°656, HD 76700, HIP 43686, SAO 250370, LTT 3291, NLTT 20555, 2MASS J08535550-6648034

Database references
| SIMBAD | data |
| Exoplanet Archive | data |

HD 76700 is a star in the southern constellation of Volans. It is yellow in hue and is too faint to be visible to the naked eye, having an apparent visual magnitude of 8.16. This object is located at a distance of 197 light years from the Sun based on stellar parallax. It is drifting further away with a radial velocity of +39 km/s.

== Properties ==
This object is a G-type main-sequence star with a stellar classification of G6V, which indicates it is generating energy through core hydrogen fusion. It is a metal-enriched star, showing a much higher metallicity than the Sun. This may be explained by prior accretion of refractory-rich planetary bodies into the stellar atmosphere. The mass of HD 76700 is very similar to (1.1 times) that of the Sun, but it is cooler and brighter (with an effective temperature of 5,694 K and luminosity of 1.69 Suns) and thus much older—around 6.9 billion years old.

== Planetary system ==
HD 76700 is orbited by a giant planet that was discovered in 2003 via the radial velocity method. Designated HD 76700 b, this planet is orbiting very close to the star with a period of just four days.

The HD 76700 planetary system
| Companion (in order from star) | Mass | Semimajor axis (AU) | Orbital period (days) | Eccentricity | Inclination (°) | Radius |
|---|---|---|---|---|---|---|
| b | ≥ 0.23 M_{J} | 0.0511±0.0030 | 3.97101±0.00020 | 0.0616+0.0426 −0.0587 | — | 0.99 R_{J} |
