= A Carinae =

The Bayer designations A Carinae and a Carinae are distinct. Due to technical limitations, both designations link here.

- A Carinae, see V415 Carinae
- a Carinae, see V357 Carinae

== See also ==
- α Carinae
