= Delta Volantis =

Luminous star in the constellation Volans

δ Volantis
- Location of δ Volantis

Observation data Epoch J2000.0 Equinox ICRS
- Constellation: Volans
- Right ascension: 07^{h} 16^{m} 49.82387^{s}
- Declination: −67° 57′ 25.7484″
- Apparent magnitude (V): 3.97

Characteristics
- Spectral type: F6 II
- U−B color index: +0.45
- B−V color index: +0.78

Astrometry
Radial velocity (R_{v})	22.7±0.3 km/s
Proper motion (μ)	RA: −4.43 mas/yr Dec.: +8.38 mas/yr
Parallax (π)	4.42±0.11 mas
Distance	740 ± 20 ly (226 ± 6 pc)
Absolute magnitude (M_{V})	−2.6

Details
Mass	5 M_{☉}
Radius	36.1 R_{☉}
Luminosity	1,095±57 L_{☉}
Surface gravity (log g)	1.77 cgs
Temperature	5,637 K
Metallicity [Fe/H]	+0.11 dex
Rotational velocity (v sin i)	5.6±0.3 km/s

Other designations
- δ Vol, CPD−67°730, FK5 281, HD 57623, HIP 35228, HR 2803, SAO 249809

Database references
SIMBAD	data

Delta Volantis, Latinized from δ Volantis, is a solitary star in the southern constellation Volans. It has an apparent visual magnitude of +3.97, which is bright enough to be seen with the naked eye. Based upon parallax measurements, is approximately 740 light years from the Solar System.

This is an F-type bright giant star with a stellar classification of F6 II. It has five times Sun's mass, an estimated radius 36 times that of the Sun, and shines with more than a thousand times the Sun's luminosity. The outer atmosphere has an effective temperature of 5,637 K, giving it a yellow hue.
