= Gamma Volantis =

K-type giant star in the constellation Volans

γ Volantis
- Location of γ Volantis

Observation data Epoch J2000.0 Equinox ICRS
- Constellation: Volans
- γ^{1} Vol
- Right ascension: 07^{h} 08^{m} 42.3703^{s}
- Declination: −70° 29′ 49.527″
- Apparent magnitude (V): 5.68
- γ^{2} Vol
- Right ascension: 07^{h} 08^{m} 44.8657^{s}
- Declination: −70° 29′ 56.149″
- Apparent magnitude (V): 3.78

Characteristics
- Spectral type: F2V + K0III

Astrometry

γ^{1} Vol
Radial velocity (R_{v})	−3 km/s
Proper motion (μ)	RA: 11.069(437) mas/yr Dec.: 107.302(577) mas/yr
Parallax (π)	22.7501±0.4619 mas
Distance	143 ± 3 ly (44.0 ± 0.9 pc)
Absolute magnitude (M_{V})	2.51

γ^{2} Vol
Radial velocity (R_{v})	+2.8 km/s
Proper motion (μ)	RA: 23.620(154) mas/yr Dec.: 108.653(170) mas/yr
Parallax (π)	24.4775±0.1130 mas
Distance	133.2 ± 0.6 ly (40.9 ± 0.2 pc)

Details

γ^{1} Vol
Mass	1.69 M_{☉}
Surface gravity (log g)	2.71 cgs
Temperature	6,541 K
Metallicity [Fe/H]	+0.12 dex
Rotational velocity (v sin i)	4.4±0.2 km/s
Age	1.4 Gyr

γ^{2} Vol
Mass	2.15±0.07 M_{☉}
Radius	10.20±0.23 R_{☉}
Luminosity	53.7±1.6 L_{☉}
Surface gravity (log g)	2.74±0.095 cgs
Temperature	4,892±41 K
Metallicity [Fe/H]	0.054±0.03 dex

Other designations
- γ Vol, CPD−70°600, FK5 1189
- γ^{1} Vol: HD 55864, HIP 34473, HR 2735, SAO 256373
- γ^{2} Vol: HD 55865, HIP 34481, HR 2736, SAO 256374

Database references
SIMBAD	γ^{1} Vol
- γ^{2} Vol

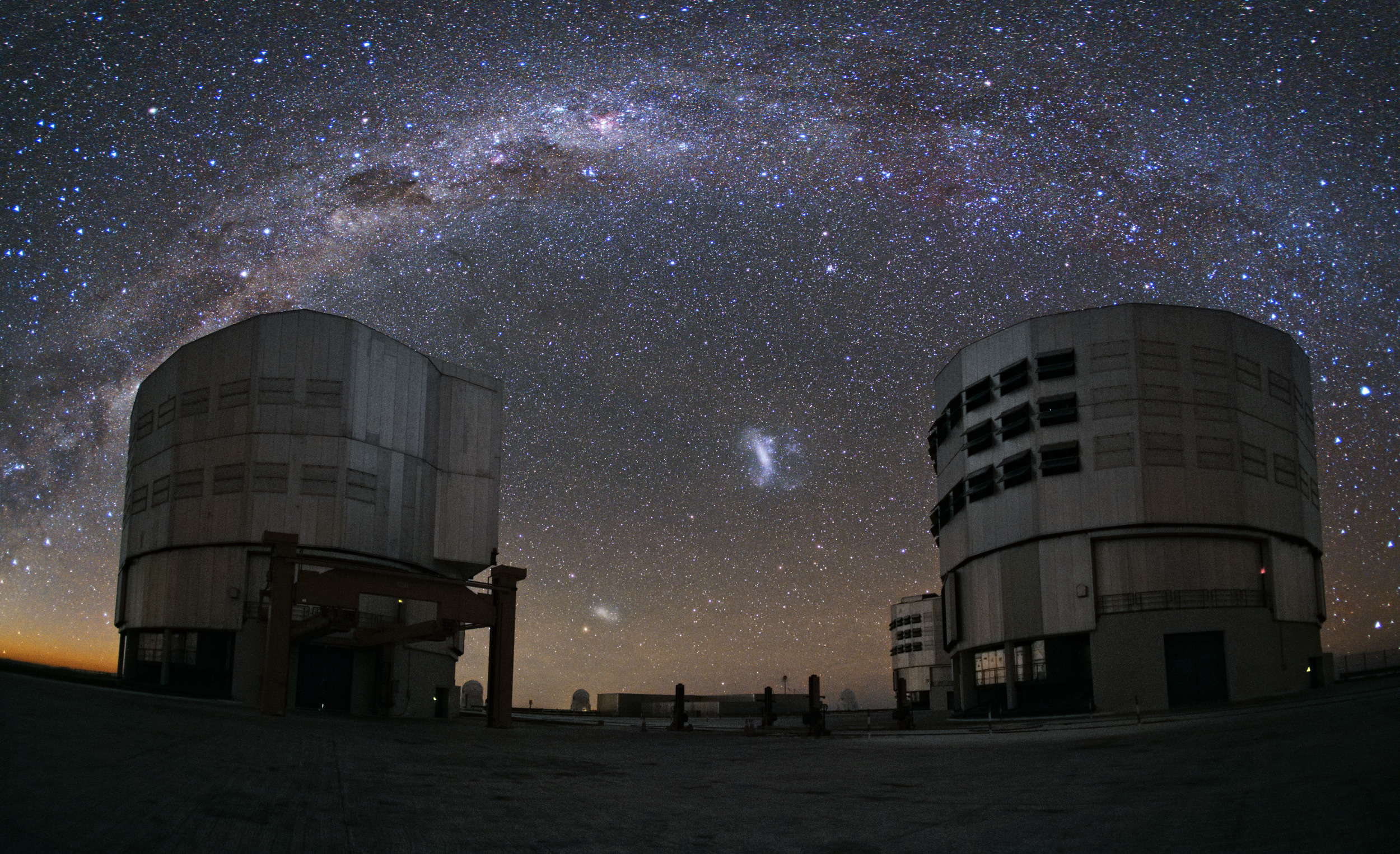
Sky over Paranal. γ Volantis is in the centre of the image, above (actually northeast of) the Large Magellanic Cloud.

Gamma Volantis, Latinized from γ Volantis, is a wide binary star system in the southern constellation of Volans. Based upon parallax measurements, it is approximately 133 light years from Earth. At a combined apparent magnitude of +3.61, it is bright enough to be seen with the naked eye and can be found around 9° to the east-southeast of the Large Magellanic Cloud.

The brighter component, designated γ^{2} Volantis, is an orange K-type giant star with a stellar classification of K0III and an apparent magnitude of +3.78, making this the brightest star in the constellation. Its companion, γ^{1} Volantis, is an F-type main-sequence star of classification F2V and an apparent magnitude of +5.68. As of 2002, the pair were at an angular separation of 14.1″ along a position angle of 296°. Their separation has decreased from 15.7″ in 1826. The secondary is a source of X-ray emission with a luminosity of 8.3×10^{28} erg s^{−1}.
