= Volans =

Constellation in the southern celestial hemisphere

- Constellation
- List of stars in Volans
- Abbreviation: Vol
- Genitive: Volantis
- Pronunciation: /ˈvoʊlænz/, genitive /vɒˈlæntɪs/
- Symbolism: the Flying Fish
- Right ascension: 06^{h} 31^{m} 04.9703^{s}–09^{h} 04^{m} 22.7345^{s}
- Declination: −64.1070251°–−75.4954681°
- Quadrant: SQ2
- Area: 141 sq. deg. (76th)
- Main stars: 6
- Bayer/Flamsteed stars: 12
- Stars with planets: 2
- Stars brighter than 3.00^{m}: 0
- Stars within 10.00 pc (32.62 ly): 1
- Brightest star: γ^{2} Vol (3.62^{m})
- Nearest star: Gliese 293
- Messier objects: 0
- Meteor showers: 0
- Bordering constellations: Carina; Pictor; Dorado; Mensa; Chamaeleon
- Visible at latitudes between +15° and −90°. Best visible at 21:00 (9 p.m.) during the month of February.

Volans is a constellation in the southern sky. It represents a flying fish; its name is a shortened form of its original name, Piscis Volans. Volans was one of twelve constellations created by Petrus Plancius from the observations of Pieter Dirkszoon Keyser and Frederick de Houtman and it first appeared on a 35-cm (14") diameter celestial globe published in 1597 (or 1598) in Amsterdam by Plancius with Jodocus Hondius. The first depiction of this constellation in a celestial atlas was in Johann Bayer's Uranometria of 1603.

== History ==
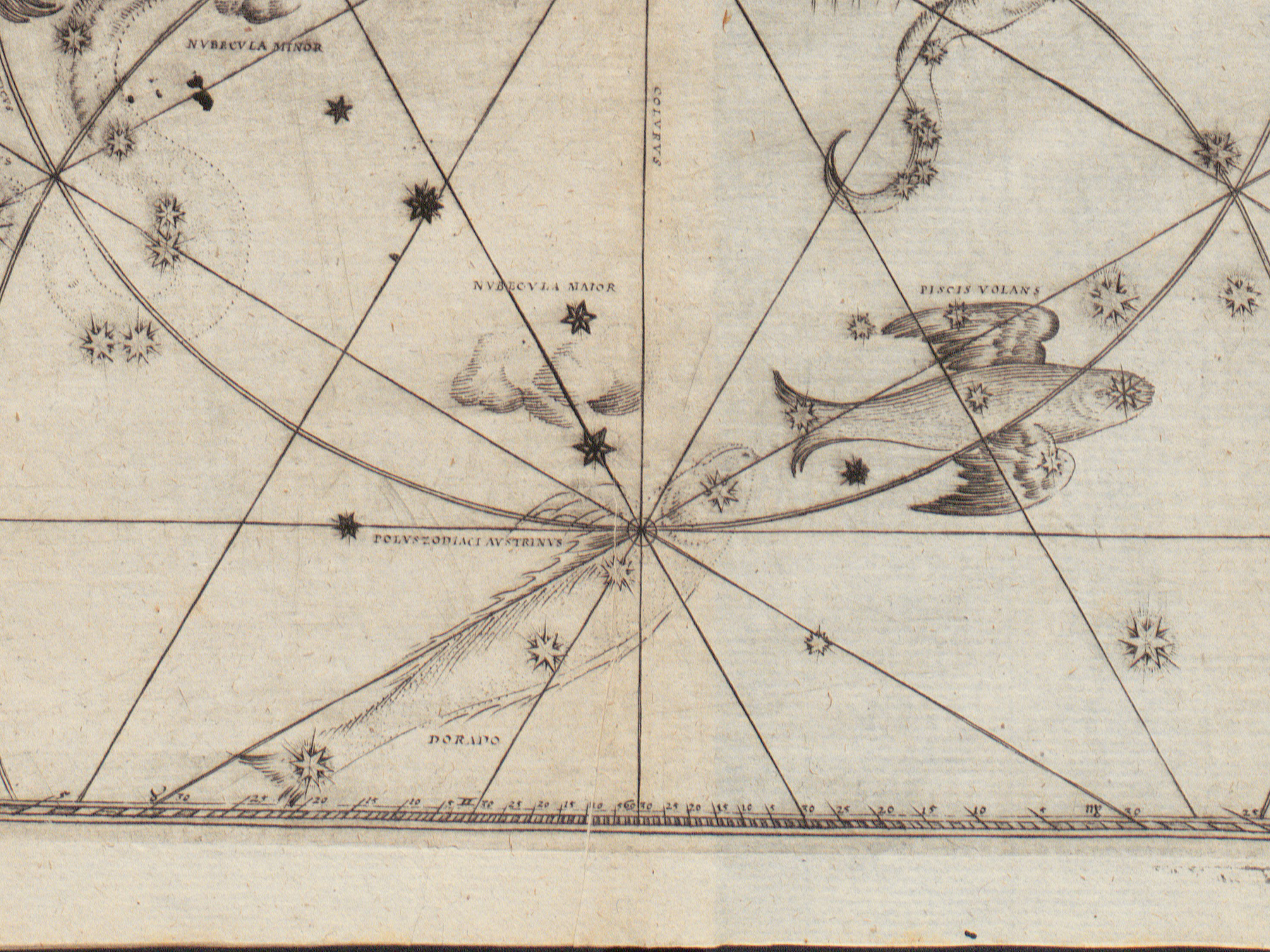
Volans as Piscis Volans (middle right) along with other constellations from Johann Bayer’s Uranometria

Volans is one of the 12 constellations that were introduced by the Dutch navigators Pieter Dirkszoon Keyser and Frederick de Houtman in the late 16th century. It was first depicted on Petrus Plancius’ globe in 1598. Plancius called the constellation Vliegendenvis (flying fish).

In 1603, Johann Bayer included the constellation in his star atlas Uranometria under the name Piscis Volans, the flying fish. John Herschel proposed shrinking the name to one word in 1844, noting that Lacaille himself had abbreviated his constellations thus on occasion. This was universally adopted.

Volans represents a type of tropical fish that can jump out of the water and glide through the air on wings. In early celestial maps, the flying fish was often depicted as accompanying the ship Argo Navis, and being chased by the predatory fish represented by the adjoining constellation Dorado.

== Features ==
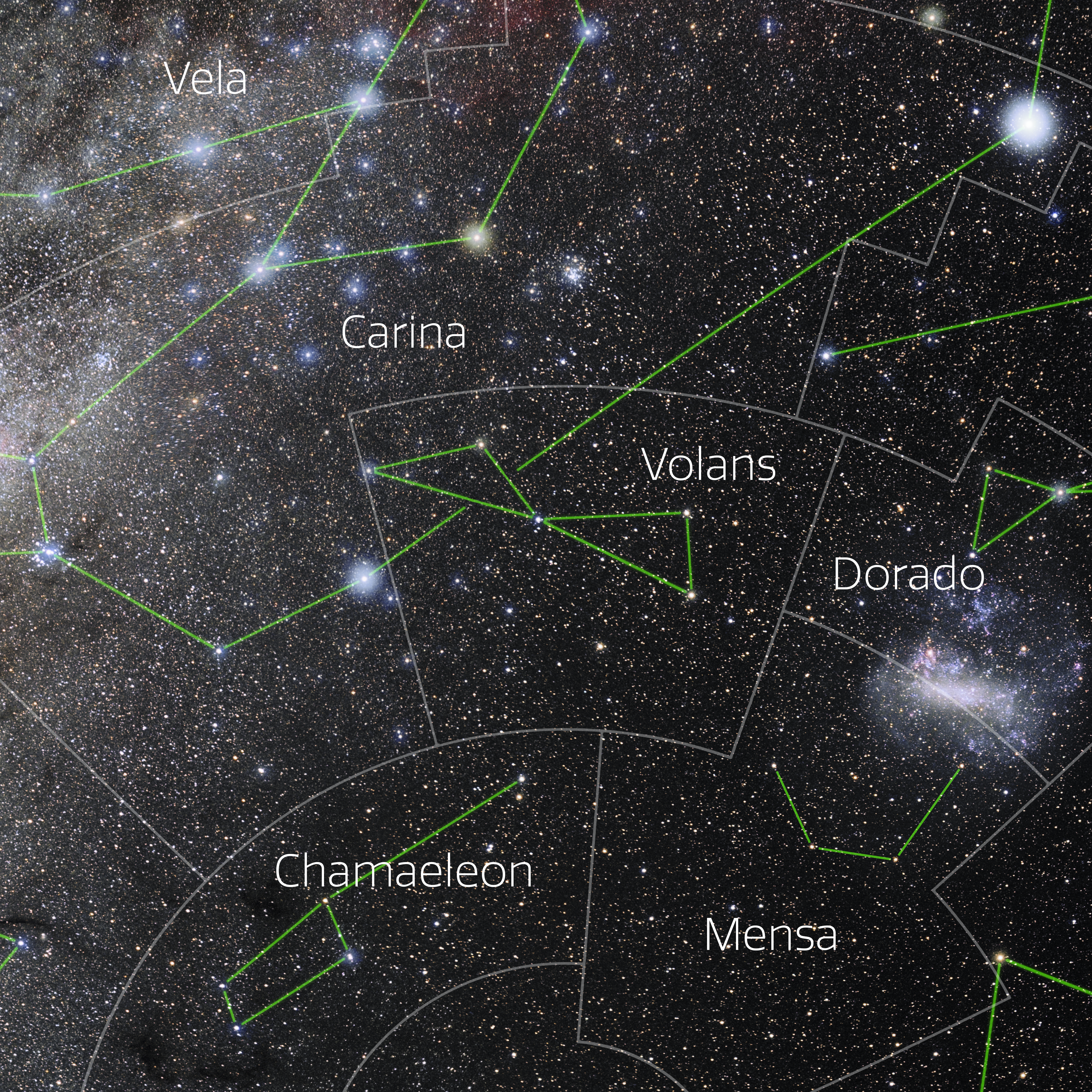
The constellation Volans showing IAU constellation boundaries, the stick figure, and labeled bright stars, from NOIRLab's 88 Constellations project.

Volans has several deep-sky objects within its borders.

=== Stars ===
Lacaille gave 12 stars Bayer designations Alpha through Kappa in 1756 and labelled two stars as Gamma and Kappa.

There are two double stars within the constellation which can be observed using a small telescope, Gamma Volantis and Epsilon Volantis, along with two galaxies which may be more difficult to see clearly, NGC 2442 and NGC 2434. The magnitudes of the Gamma Volantis stars are 3.8 and 5.6, and of Epsilon Volantis 4.4 and 7.3.

The Astronomical Society of Southern Africa in 2003 reported that observations of the variable stars R and S Volantis in Volans were very urgently needed as data on their light curves was incomplete.

HD 76700 is a sunlike star some 195 light-years distant that has been found to have a planet.

=== Deep-sky objects ===
The Lindsay-Shapley ring, also categorized as AM0644-741, is a ring galaxy located 300 million light-years from Earth. Named for its discoverers, the Lindsay-Shapley ring was found near the Large Magellanic Cloud in 1960. Like the Cartwheel Galaxy in Sculptor, the unusual shape of this galaxy results from a collision many millions of years ago. The blue ring, 150,000 light-years in diameter, was formed when a shock wave from the collision created a ring of hot blue stars; the yellow core is an amalgamation of the progenitors' cores. NGC 2442, an intermediate-spiral galaxy, is also located in this constellation, with a distance of 50 million light-years from Earth.

Graham's Object, aka Das Rheingold or Nibelungen Ring is a ring shaped galaxy at R.A. 6h 41.4m / Decl. -74° 19' (2000.0) in Volans

== See also ==
- IAU-recognized constellations
- Volans (Chinese astronomy)

== Sources ==
- "Volans". The Constellations. International Astronomical Union. Archived from the original on 2013-06-04.
- Ridpath, Ian; Tirion, Wil (2017), Stars and Planets Guide (5th ed.), Princeton University Press, ISBN 978-0-69-117788-5
- Staal, Julius D.W. (1988), The New Patterns in the Sky, McDonald and Woodward Publishing Company, ISBN 0-939923-04-1
- Wilkins, Jamie; Dunn, Robert (2006). 300 Astronomical Objects: A Visual Reference to the Universe. Firefly Books. ISBN 978-1-55407-175-3.
