= NGC 2144 =

Galaxy in the constellation Mensa

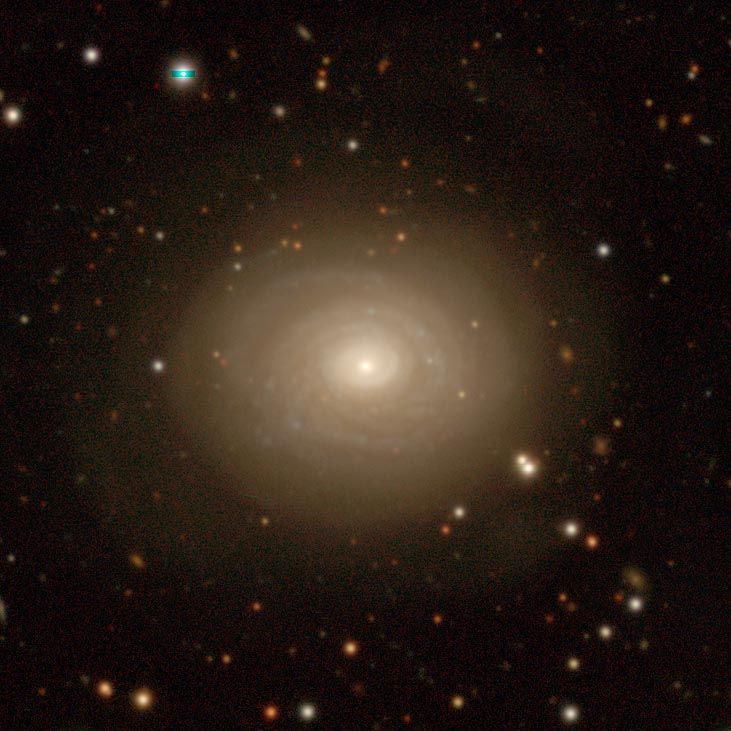

Observation data (J2000 epoch)
- Constellation: Mensa
- Right ascension: 05^{h} 40^{m} 57.07^{s}
- Declination: −82° 07′ 10.1″
- Heliocentric radial velocity: 4774 ± 27 km/s
- Apparent magnitude (B): 13.93
- Surface brightness: 23.32 mag/arcsec^2

Characteristics
- Type: Spiral galaxy

Other designations
- PGC 17592

NGC 2144 is a spiral galaxy located in the constellation Mensa in the southern hemisphere. It was discovered by British astronomer John Herschel on 17 January 1836. NGC 2144 is not a Messier Object and doesn't have a Messier Number. The galaxy has been heavily documented and observed by multiple people and other organizations using telescopes.

== Gallery ==
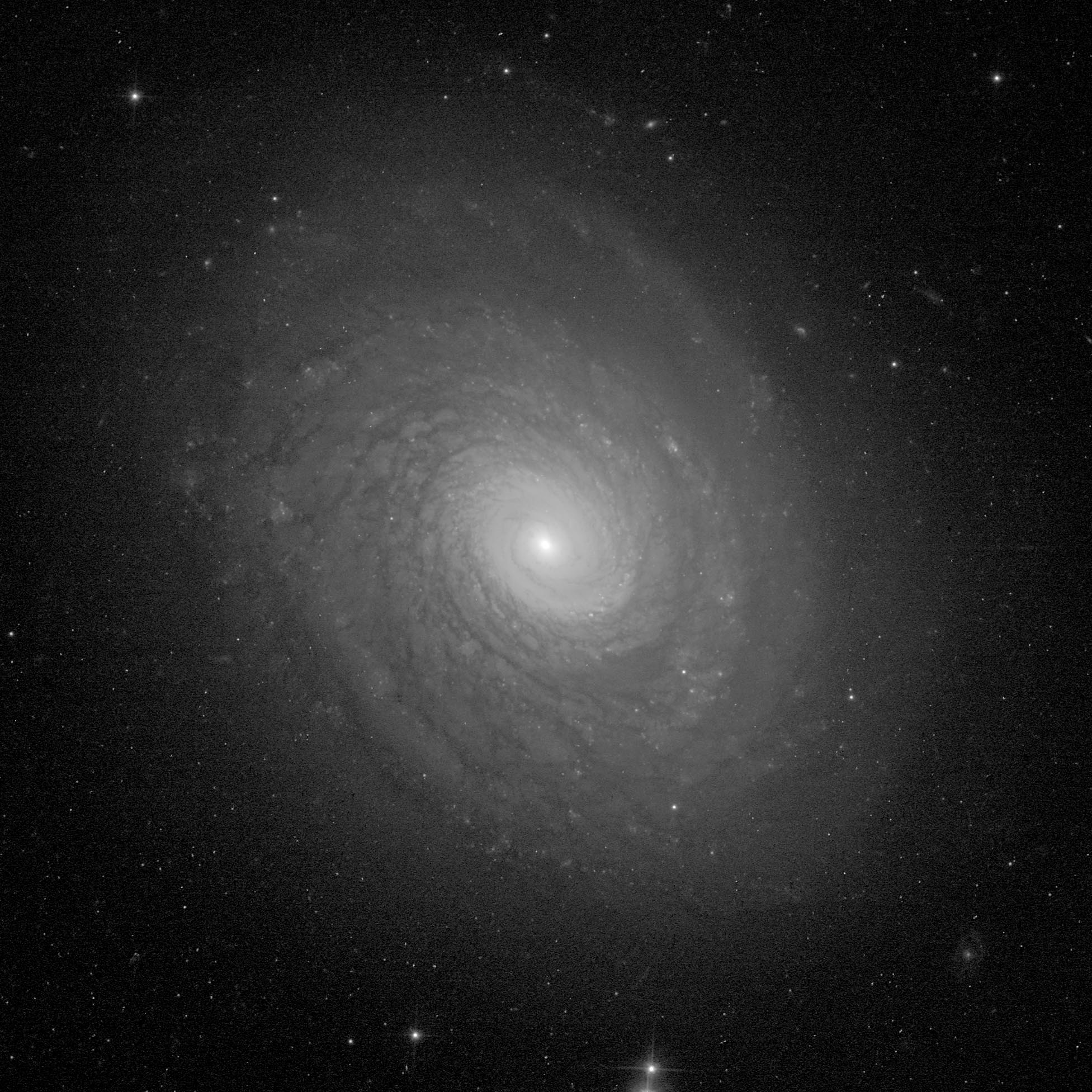
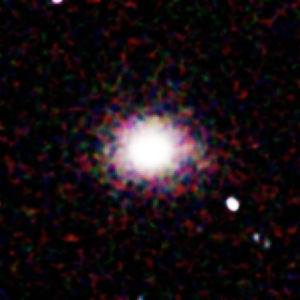
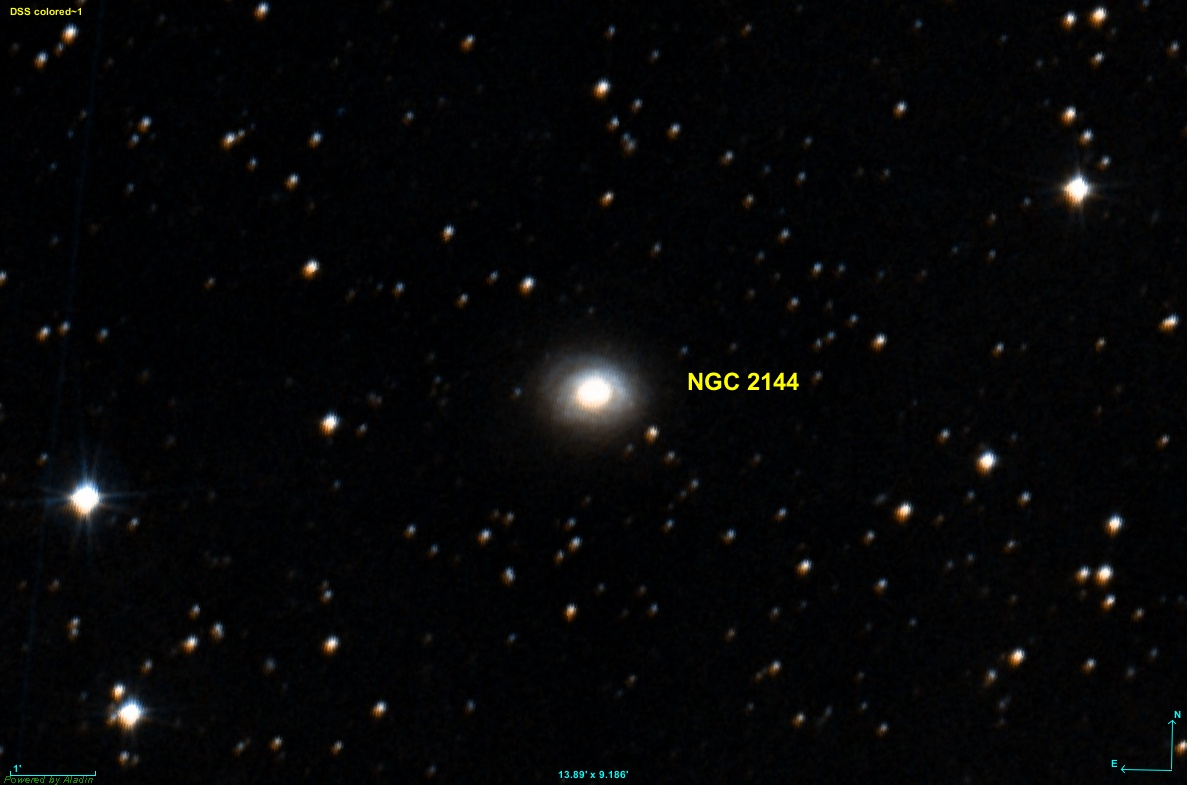
