= PLCKESZ G286.6−31.3 =

Galaxy cluster

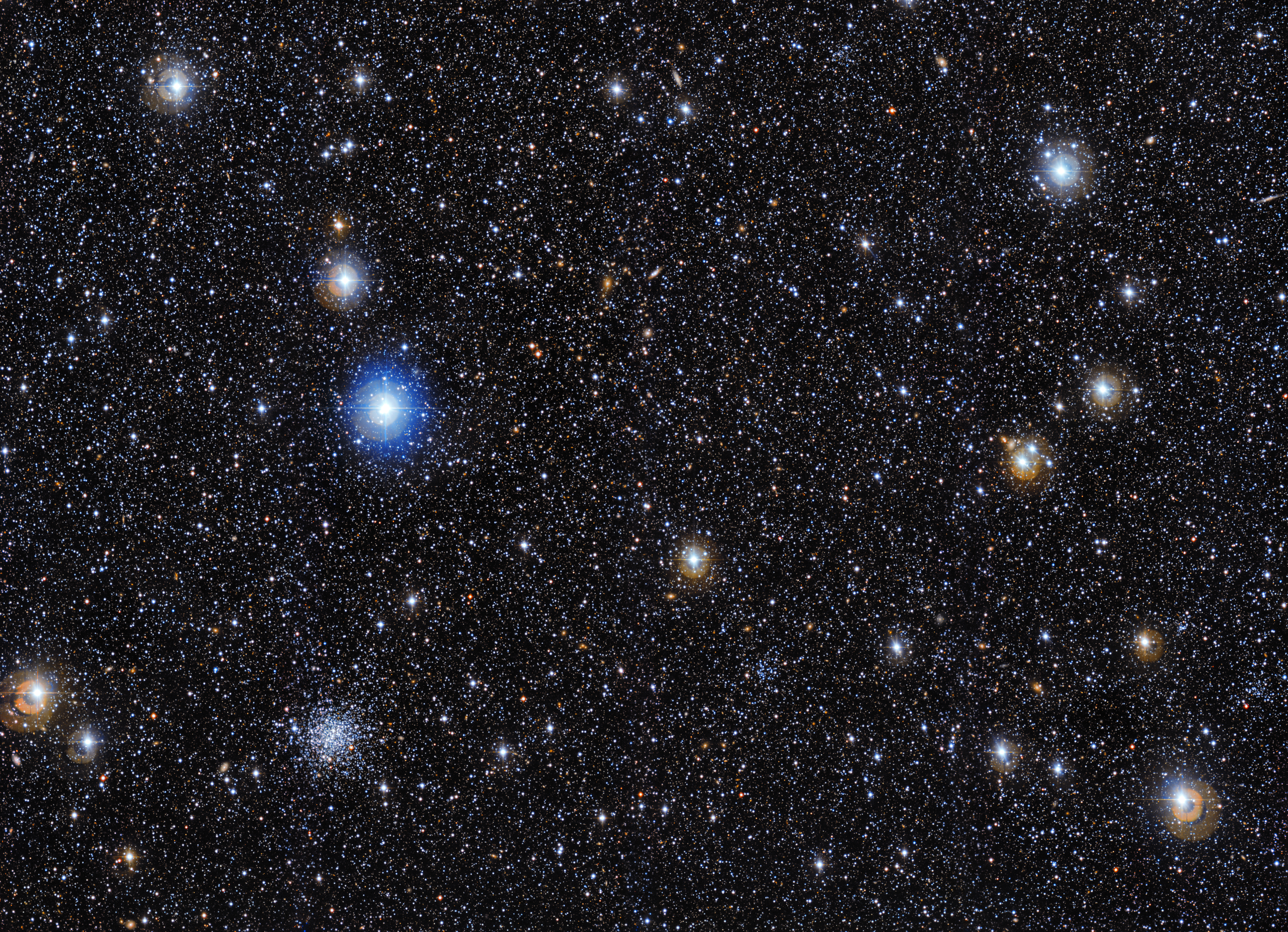
- Image of the Galaxy Cluster taken by the Wide-Field Imager along with its MPG/ESO 2.2 metre telescope.

Observation data (Epoch )
- Constellation: Mensa
- Right ascension: 05^{h} 31^{m} 22.3^{s}
- Declination: −75° 09′ 50″
- Redshift: 0.2100

PLCKESZ G286.6−31.3 is a galaxy cluster that is seen through the outer fringes of the Large Magellanic Cloud. It has 530 trillion times the Sun's mass, up to 100 galaxies, more than 700 star clusters, and hundreds to thousands of supergiant stars. It is invisible to the naked eye.
