= NGC 1986 =

Open cluster in the constellation Mensa

Observation data (J2000.0 epoch)
- Right ascension: 05^{h} 27^{m} 38.1^{s}
- Declination: −69° 58′ 25″
- Apparent magnitude (V): 11.31
- Apparent dimensions (V): 2.80′ × 2.40′

Physical characteristics
- Other designations: ESO 56-SC134

Associations
- Constellation: Mensa

NGC 1986 (also known as ESO 56-SC134) is an open cluster which is located in the constellation Mensa which is part of the Large Magellanic Cloud. It was discovered by James Dunlop on September 27, 1826. It has an apparent magnitude of 11.31 and its size is 2.80 by 2.40 arc minutes.
