= NGC 1943 =

Star cluster in the constellation Mensa

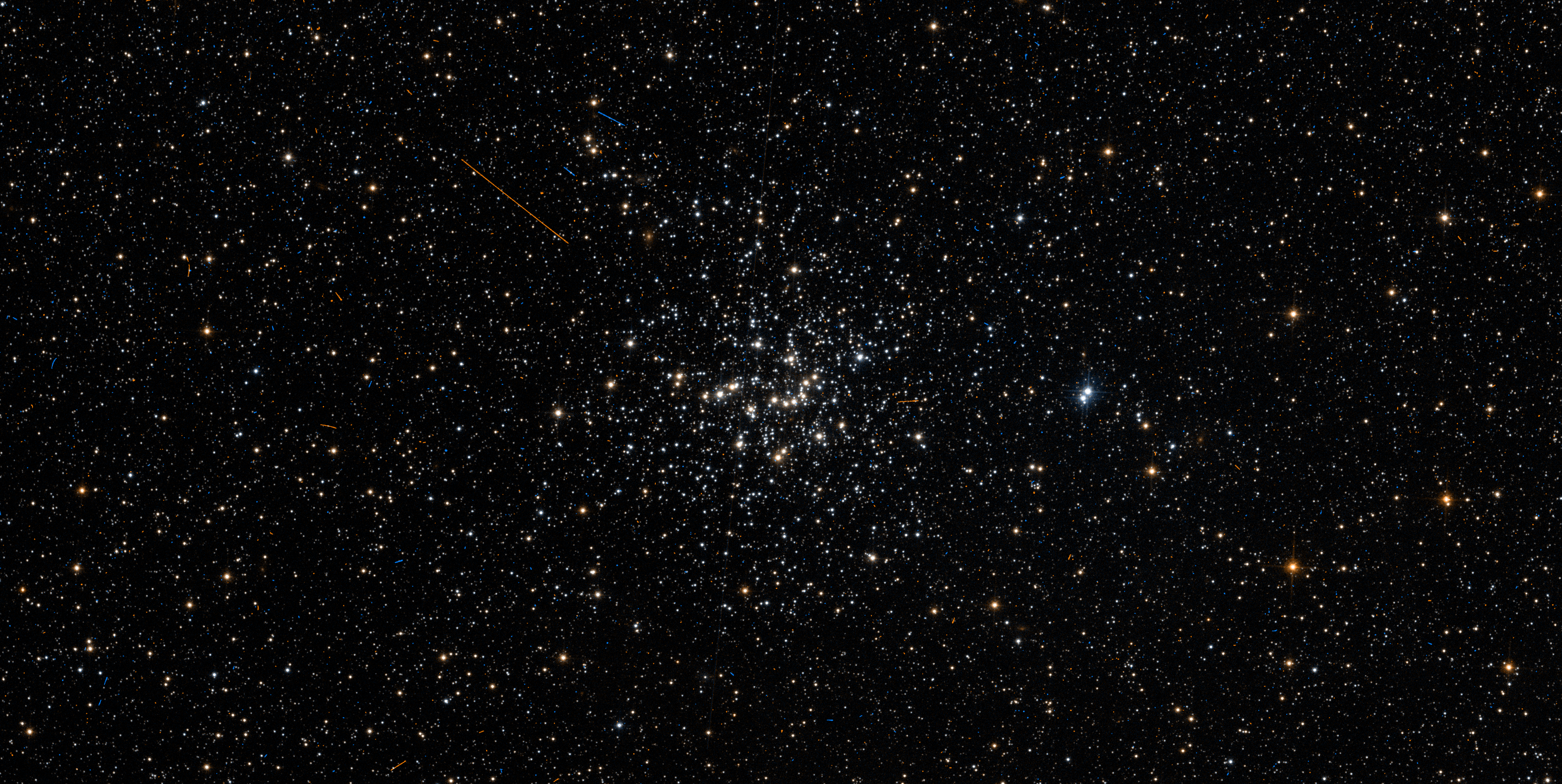
- Hubble Space Telescope photograph of NGC 1943

Observation data (J2000.0 epoch)
- Right ascension: 05^{h} 22^{m} 28.7^{s}
- Declination: −69° 20′ 07″
- Apparent magnitude (V): 11.9

Physical characteristics

Associations
- Constellation: Mensa

NGC 1943 is a star cluster in the constellation Mensa. It was discovered in 1826 by the astronomer James Dunlop with a 23-cm telescope.
