= NGC 2012 =

Large spiral galaxy in Mensa

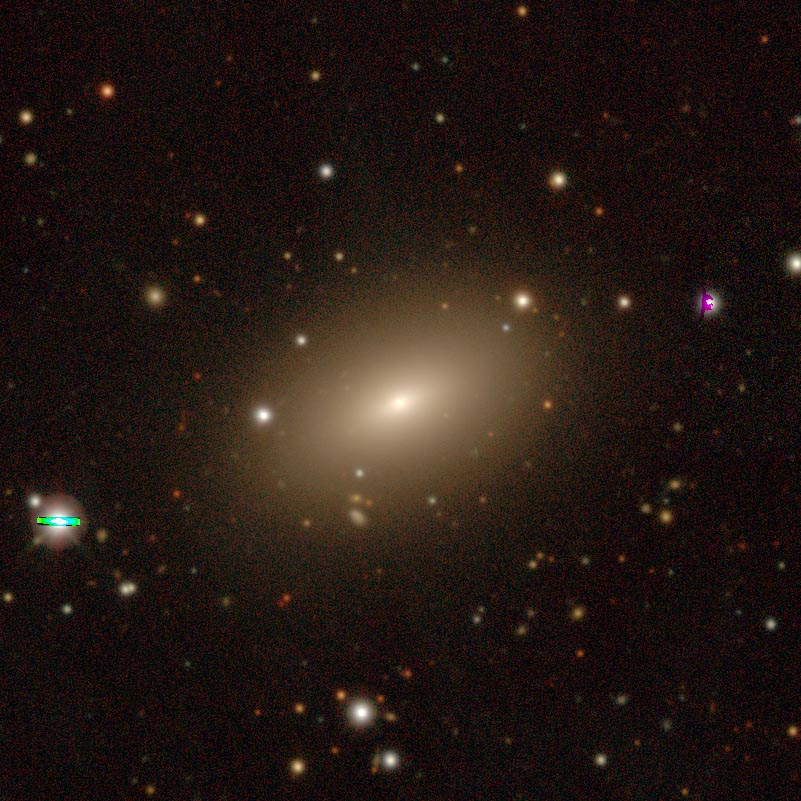
- NGC 2012, as photographed during the Legacy Surveys DR10

Observation data (J2000 epoch)
- Constellation: Mensa
- Right ascension: 05h 22m 35s
- Declination: -79° 51’ 06”
- Distance: 236.137 Mly (51.66 Mpc)
- Apparent magnitude (V): 10.58
- Apparent magnitude (B): 14.49
- Surface brightness: 23.29 mag/arcsec2

Characteristics
- Type: E-SO
- Apparent size (V): 1 arcmin
- Notable features: N/A

Other designations
- Leda 17194

NGC 2012 is a large lenticular galaxy in the Constellation Mensa. It was discovered by John Herschel in 1836. With its distance from the Earth being over 236 million light years, NGC 2012 is not visible to the naked eye, and a large telescope is needed. A probe has never been sent out to study the galaxy.

== Discovery ==
Polymath John Herschel observed the galaxy in 1836, and it was then added to the New General Catalog (NGC). The galaxy itself is a relatively long distance from Earth, making Herschel's find very uncommon for the time period.
