= NGC 2173 =

Globular cluster in the constellation Mensa

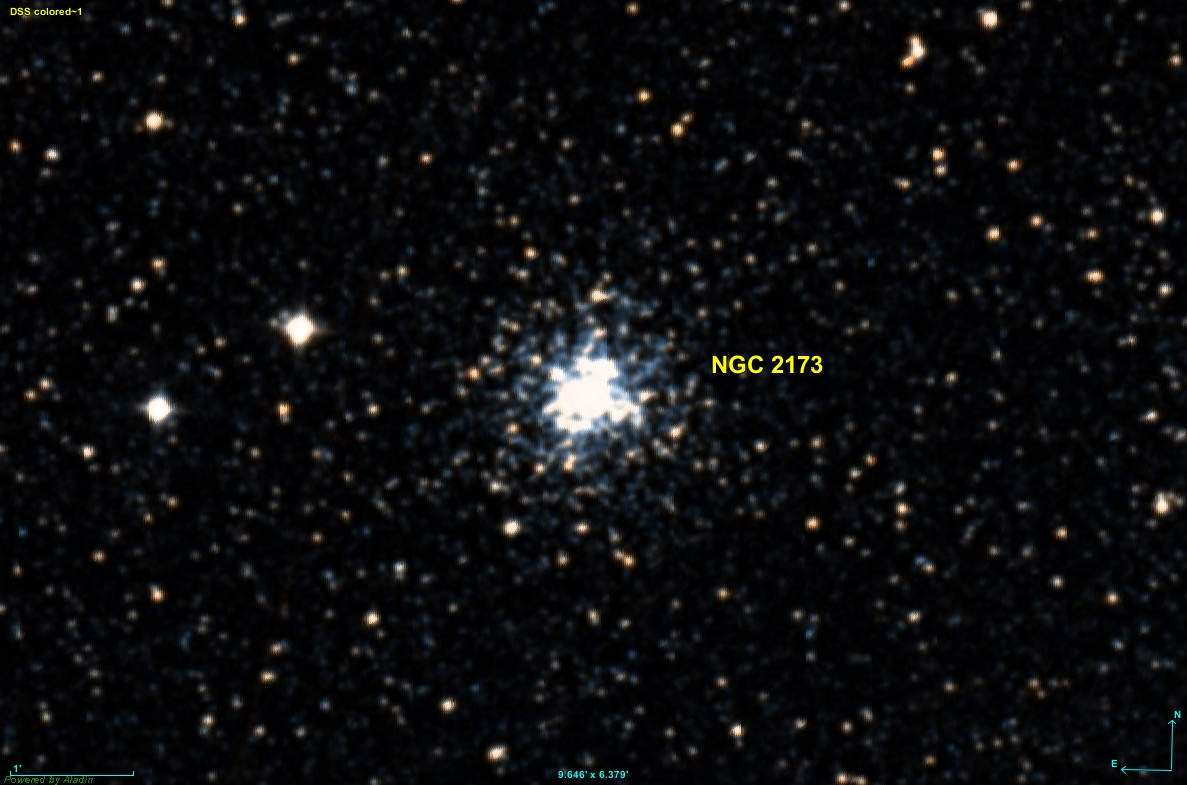

Observation data (J2000 epoch)
- Constellation: Mensa
- Right ascension: 05^{h} 57^{m} 58.0^{s}
- Declination: −72° 58′ 42″
- Distance: 158.8 ± 3.3 kly (48.7 ± 1.0 kpc)
- Apparent magnitude (V): 11.88
- Apparent dimensions (V): 2.60″

Physical characteristics
- Mass: ~10^{5} M_{☉}
- Metallicity: [Fe/H] = −0.42 dex
- Estimated age: 1.7±0.2 Gyr.
- Other designations: NGC 2173, SL 807, LW 348, ESO 33SC34

NGC 2173 is a globular cluster of stars in the southern constellation of Mensa. It was discovered on February 8, 1836 by English astronomer John Herschel. The cluster has an apparent visual magnitude of 11.88, and an angular size of 2.60″. It is located at a distance of approximately 159,000 ly (48.7 kpc) from the Sun.

The cluster is located within the Large Magellanic Cloud, to the southeast of the galaxy's center at a separation of around 11,000 ly (3.5 kpc). A 1986 age estimate based on the main sequence turnoff found a value of 1.8±0.7 Gyr. This was later refined to 1.7±0.2 Gyr. Variations in lower mass element abundances suggest that the cluster has at least two distinct stellar populations with different ages.

In 2018, it was announced by Li et al (2018) that the blue straggler stars in the cluster formed two distinct sequences. However, an objection was raised that this finding was an artifact of field contamination: by applying decontamination techniques, one of the sequences could be shown to be unrelated to the cluster. With the availability of higher precision proper motion data, the existence of the bifurcatated sequence was apparently reconfirmed by Wang et al (2025).
