= R71 (star) =

Star in the Large Magellanic Cloud

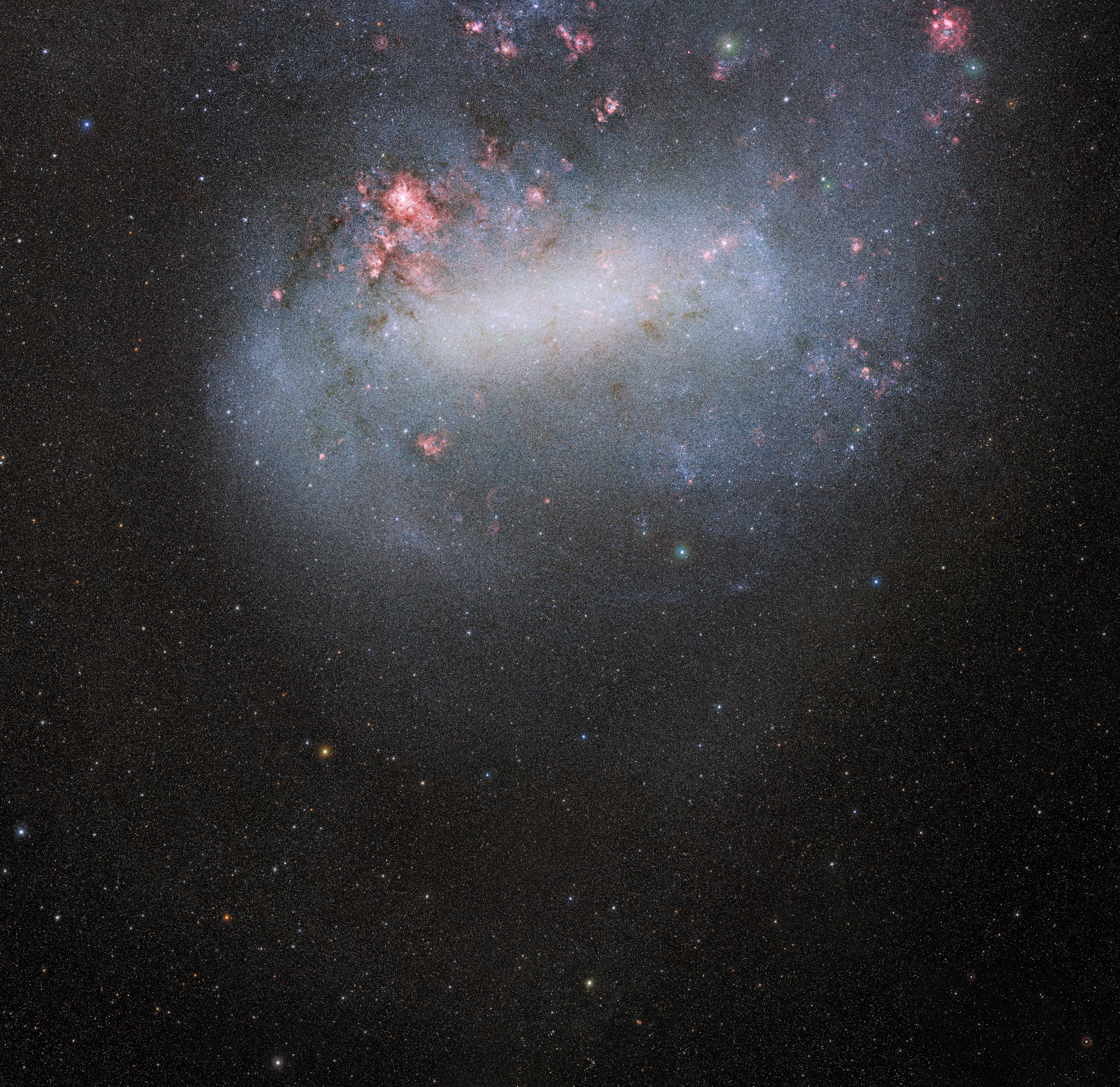
- Location of R71 (circled), next to β Men

Observation data Epoch J2000 Equinox ICRS
- Constellation: Mensa
- Right ascension: 05^{h} 02^{m} 07.394^{s}
- Declination: −71° 20′ 13.12″
- Apparent magnitude (V): 8.7 - 9.9 - 11.2

Characteristics
- Spectral type: LBV
- U−B color index: −0.63
- B−V color index: +0.05
- Variable type: LBV

Astrometry
Radial velocity (R_{v})	173.36±2.79 km/s
Proper motion (μ)	RA: 1.837 mas/yr Dec.: −0.121 mas/yr
Parallax (π)	0.0330±0.0171 mas
Distance	49,970 pc

Details

Quiesecent
Mass	27 M_{☉}
Radius	107 R_{☉}
Luminosity	603,000 L_{☉}
Surface gravity (log g)	1.80 cgs
Temperature	15,500 K

Outburst 1975
Luminosity	830,000 L_{☉}
Temperature	12,600 K

Outburst 2012
Radius	500 R_{☉}
Luminosity	1,050,000 L_{☉}
Temperature	6,650 K

Other designations
- HIP 23428, HD 269006, AAVSO 0503-71, 2MASS J05020738-7120131

Database references
SIMBAD	data

R71 (RMC 71, HD 269006) is a star in the Large Magellanic Cloud (LMC) in the constellation Mensa. It is classified as a luminous blue variable and is one of the most luminous stars in the LMC. It lies three arc-minutes southwest of the naked-eye star β Mensae.

== History of observations ==
R71 has long been known as a blue supergiant and one of the brightest stars in the Magellanic Clouds. It was given a spectral type of B2.5 Iep.

By 1974, R71 had increased in brightness from about 11th magnitude to about magnitude 9.2, and examination of historical photographic plates showed that there had been similar changes in the past, with the brightness peaking around 1914 and 1939. The increases in visual magnitude were accompanied by reddening, apparent cooling of the star. Such outbursts of 1–1.5 magnitudes from blue supergiants accompanied by cooling of several thousand kelvin, such that the bolometric luminosity remained approximately constant, were considered characteristic of a class of variables then known as S Doradus variables, now called luminous blue variables.

The outburst of R71 lasted from about 1971 until 1977, and it then faded back to about 11th magnitude. Records are incomplete, but a new outburst was observed to begin in 2006 with the brightness increasing beyond any previous observations to magnitude 8.7. The temperature also cooled to record levels around 6,650 K and the luminosity was calculated to have increased significantly. During the rise of this outburst, periodic brightness variations with an amplitude of about 0.1 magnitudes began to be seen.

== Spectrum ==
Spitzer infrared view of the Large Magellanic Cloud shows R71 as a bright red dot at the bottom (southwest) of the image

The spectrum of R71 in quiescence (minimum brightness) shows weak emission lines of Hα and Hβ and absorption lines for the rest of the Balmer series. There are many strong forbidden emission lines, especially of ionised iron. The spectrum is readily classified as a B class supergiant, the peculiarities such as emission and forbidden lines not unusual for the most luminous stars.

During the 1970s outburst, many spectral lines developed strong P Cygni profiles, while the forbidden emission lines weakened and eventually disappeared. Many other metal absorption lines appeared and the spectrum was clearly of a cooler A-class star.

In 2012, at the peak of the unusually bright outburst, the Hα lines developed into double-peaked emission lines and eventually to inverted P Cygni profiles. Hβ shows much weaker emission wings to the inverted P Cygni profiles, and other hydrogen lines show no emission. Helium spectral lines disappeared completely, suggesting much cooler temperatures. Absorption lines of metals dominate the visual spectrum, again indicating cool temperatures. A particularly unusual feature is the near-infrared forbidden emission lines of ionised calcium usually only seen in warm hypergiants, but also known from η Carinae during its great eruption. The spectral class is estimated to be as late as F9 to G1 during this outburst.

== Variability ==
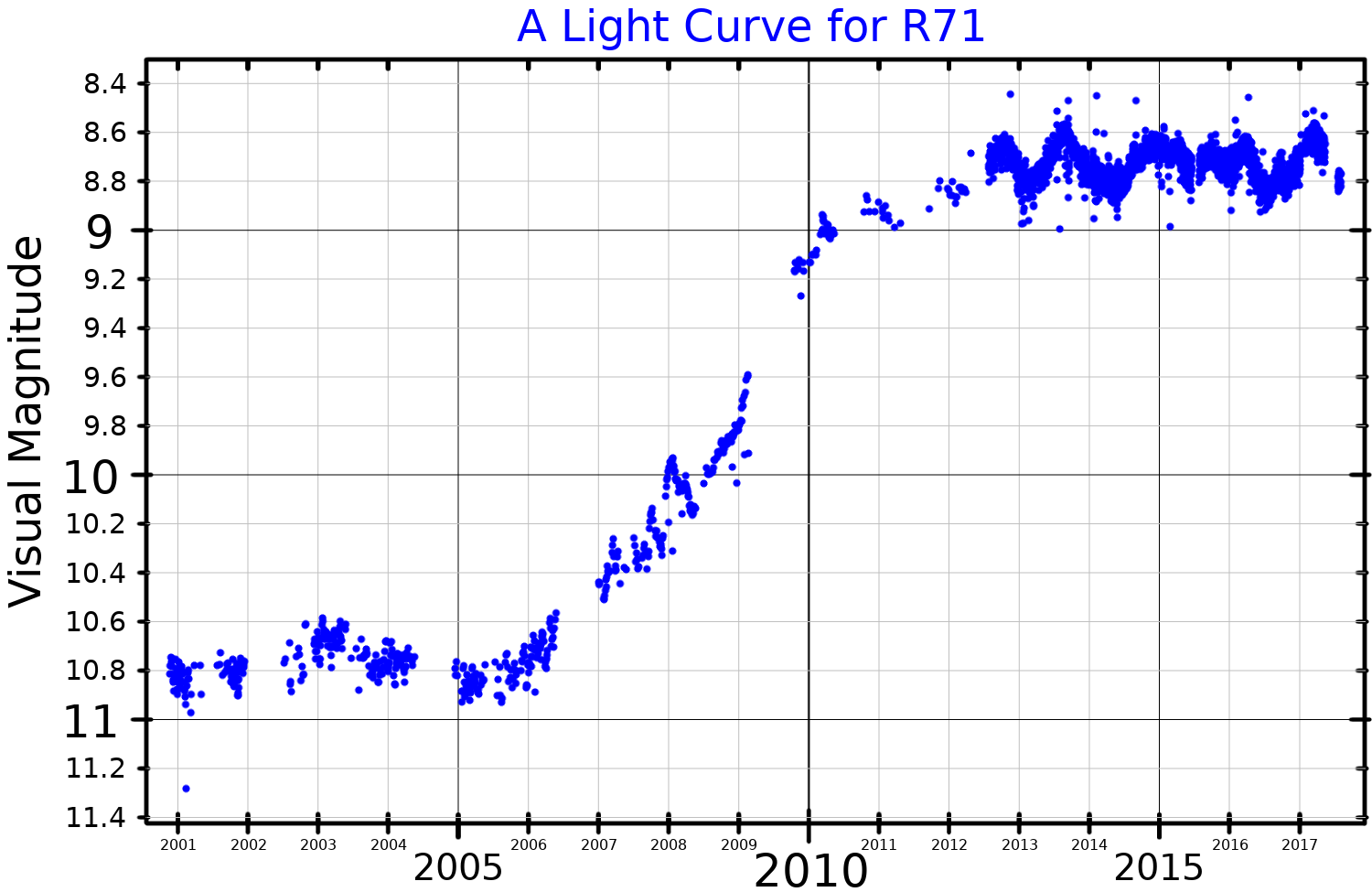
A visual band light curve for R71, adapted from Mehner et al. (2017)

R71 show brightness variations in many ways typical of the luminous blue variable group of variable stars: long periods near a minimum brightness known as quiescence; micro-variations of less than 0.1 magnitude during the quiescent periods; and outbursts of a magnitude or more lasting several years at intervals of a few decades. At quiescence the star is around magnitude 11, with the lowest brightness recorded at about magnitude 11.2. The 1914, 1939, and 1970s outbursts reached approximately magnitudes 10.2, 9.9, and 9.8 respectively.

The outbursts of R71 have apparently been getting progressively brighter, albeit from only a handful observed, with the 2012 outburst being unusually bright for this class of variables, reaching a peak of magnitude 8.7. It is also unusual in that periodic variations of about 0.2 magnitudes developed during the rise to maximum brightness. The period of these variations increased as the brightness increased until it was around 425 days.

== Properties ==
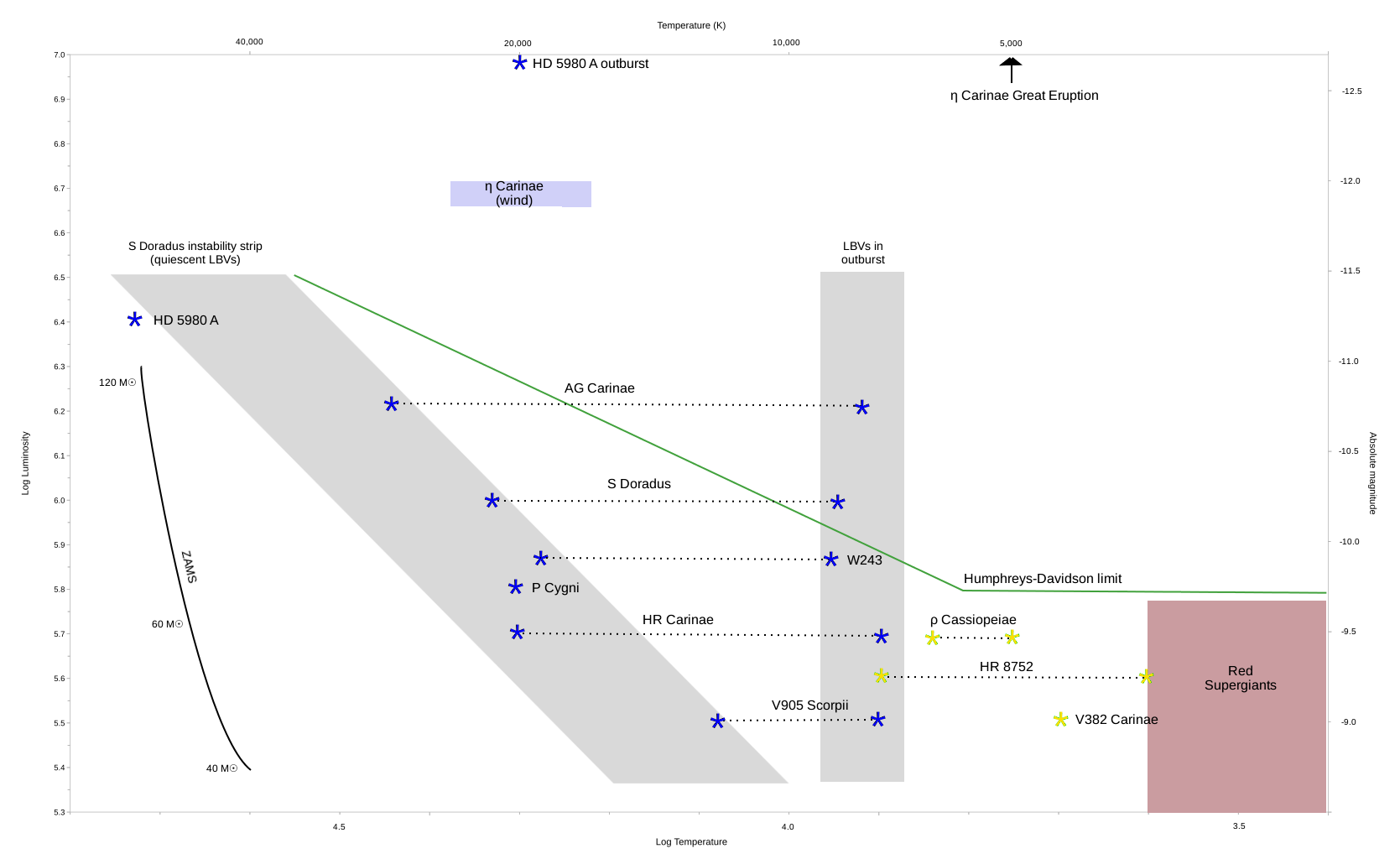
H-R Diagram showing the location of the luminous blue variables and their typical behaviour during an outburst.

R71 is one of the most luminous stars known, and the most luminous in the Magellanic Clouds during the 2012 outburst. During quiescence, it appears as like other very luminous early B supergiants, about 15,000 K and 600,000 L_{☉}. The radius of this type of stars is not well-defined as it has a dense stellar wind and is losing mass at about one M_{☉} every three million years. The standard definition of a stellar surface at optical depth of 2/3 gives a radius of 107 R_{☉}, but a more realistic definition of the surface for this type of star is at optical depth of 20 which gives a radius of 97 R_{☉}.

During an outburst, R71 cools and expands although the bolometric luminosity does not change greatly, which is typical behaviour for a luminous blue variable. Because of the cooler temperature, more of the electromagnetic radiation is emitted at visual wavelengths and the visual brightness increases. During the abnormal 2012 outburst, the star cooled beyond the typical luminous blue variable minimum temperature of about 8,500 K, reaching something like 6,650 K and the radius increased about five times to around 500 R_{☉}. The luminosity apparently also increased to over a million L_{☉}, something which has been seen in other LBVs but is thought to be unusual. This is likely to be beyond than the empirical Humphreys–Davidson limit at which stars become unstable because of their high luminosity.

The brightness variations shown during the unusually cool outburst may be related to those shown by Cepheid variables and RV Tauri variables. The particularly low temperature brings R71 close to the instability strip where temperature-related opacity changes in the atmosphere cause regular pulsations.

== Evolution ==
Luminous blue variables have traditionally been considered to be in a short-lived unstable transition state before a massive star becomes a Wolf–Rayet star. This has been challenged by the theory that LBVs are the result of binary mass transfer with the mass gaining star becoming a massive and unstable luminous blue variable. R71 appears to be a very massive star that did not form within a mass star cluster, making it likely that it did not initially form as a very massive star. Instead it may have become massive later by gaining mass from a companion.

For either formation method, the next stage of evolution for R71 is likely to be a hydrogen-free Wolf-Rayet star. Eventually it is inevitable that its core will collapse, which may result in a supernova. However, a proportion of stars similar to R71 appear to undergo progressively more violent outbursts until they are destroyed. Also, some or all Wolf–Rayet stars may collapse directly to a black hole without producing a bright supernova explosion.
