= NGC 1914 =

Stellar cluster in the Large Magellanic Cloud

Nebula
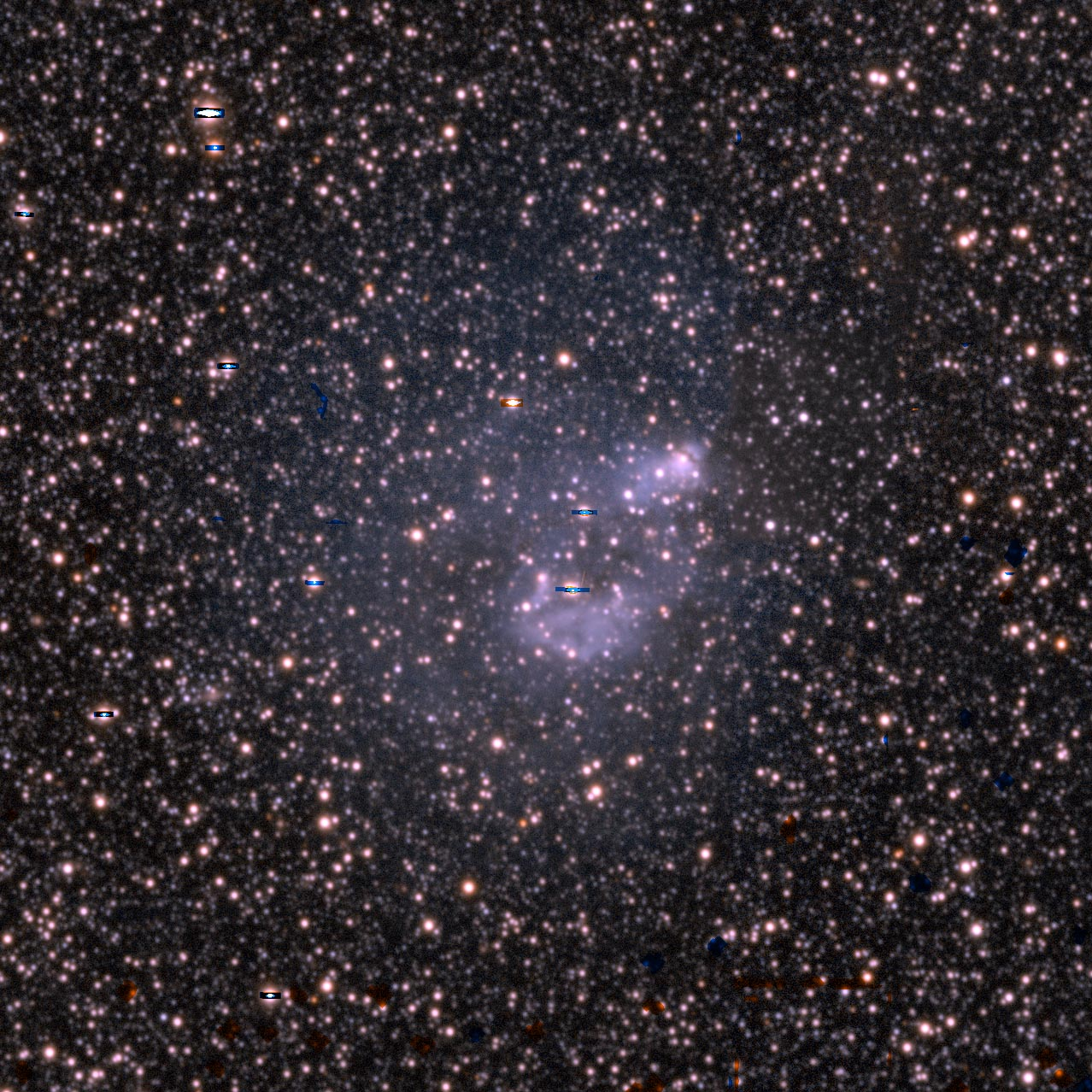

Observation data: J2000.0 epoch
- Right ascension: 05^{h} 17^{m} 37.00^{s}
- Declination: −71° 15′ 0.0″
- Distance: 160,000 ly
- Constellation: Mensa
- Designations: NGC 1914, LH 40, KMHK 732

NGC 1914 (also known as LH 40) is a compact stellar association and emission/reflection nebula located in the constellation of Mensa. It lies within the Large Magellanic Cloud (LMC), approximately 160,000 light-years from Earth. It was discovered by John Herschel on November 3, 1834.

== Observation ==
The central cluster is compact and contains several O- and B-type stars that ionize the surrounding gas, producing vivid Hα emission. The nebula displays a highly structured, labyrinth-like appearance with numerous dark dust lanes, knots, and faint diffuse extensions. One prominent dark nebula within the object has a distinctive seahorse shape, leading amateur astronomers to nickname the entire complex the Labyrinth Nebula.
