= NGC 2000 =

Open star cluster in the constellation Mensa

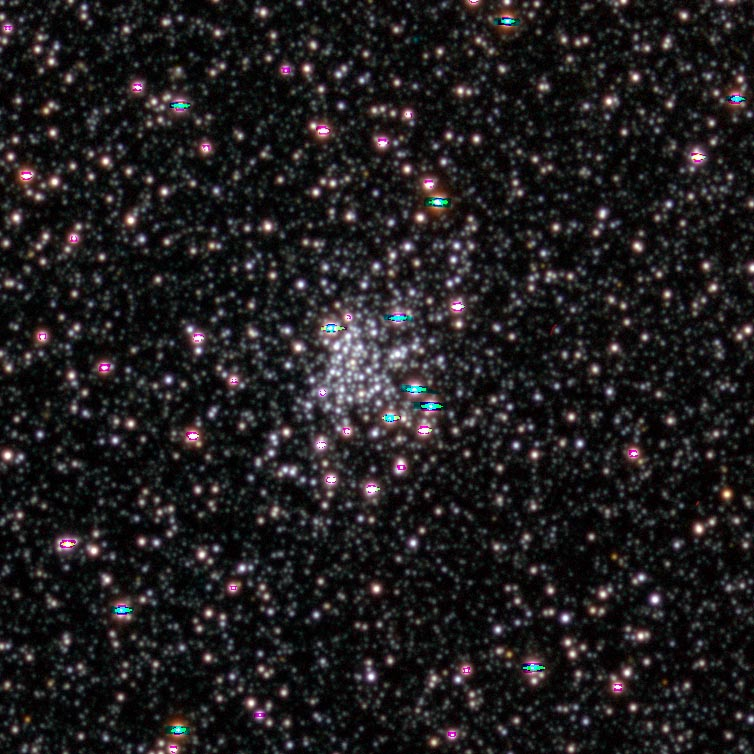
- Legacy surveys image of NGC 2000

Observation data (J2000.0 epoch)
- Right ascension: 05^{h} 27.30^{m}
- Declination: −71° 52.5′
- Distance: 160,000–165,000
- Apparent magnitude (V): 12.14
- Apparent dimensions (V): 1.6′

Physical characteristics

Associations
- Constellation: Mensa

NGC 2000 is an open cluster located in the constellation Mensa, in the Large Magellanic Cloud. It is around 160-165 thousand light-years away. It was discovered in 1836 by John Herschel.
