= NGC 1959 =

Star cluster in the constellation Mensa

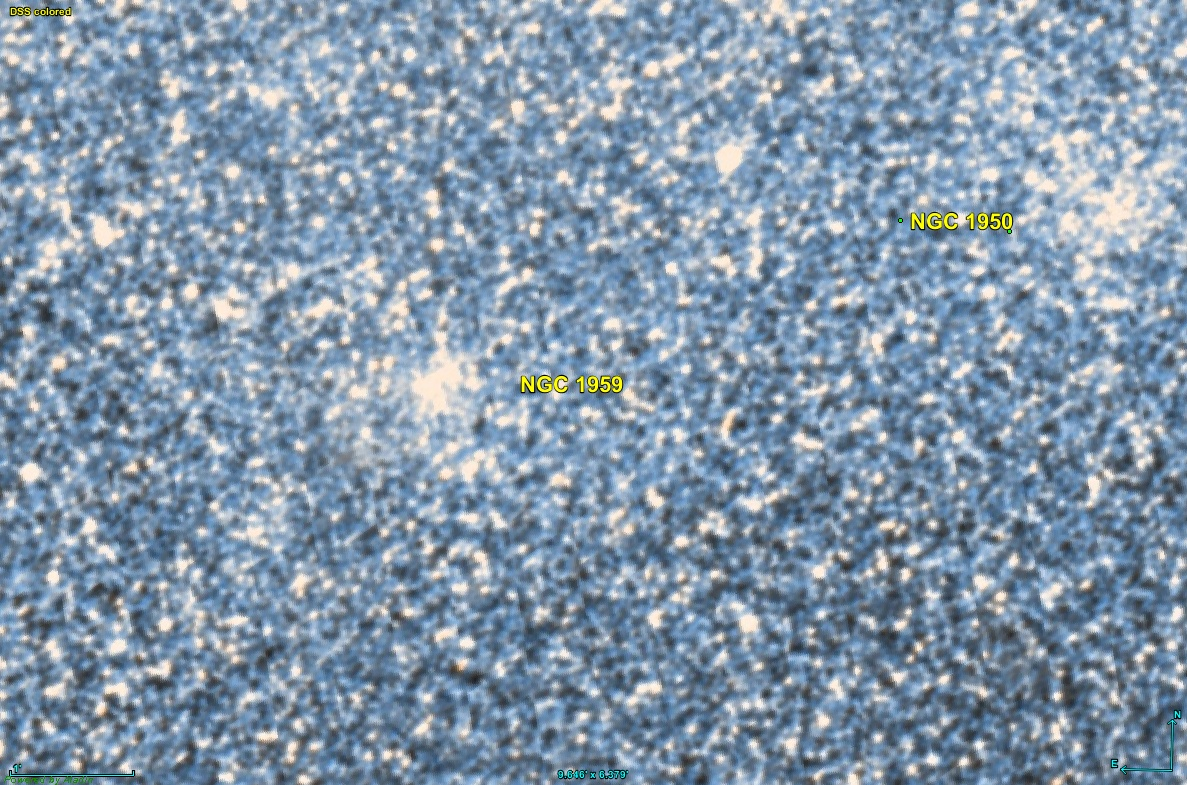
- NGC 1959 in the centre with NGC 1950, in the top right from it.

Observation data (J2000 epoch)
- Right ascension: 05^{h} 25^{m} 36.6^{s}
- Declination: −69° 55′ 37″
- Apparent magnitude (V): 12.2

Physical characteristics
- Other designations: ESO 56-SC120, GC 1164, h 2865

Associations
- Constellation: Mensa

NGC 1959 (also known as ESO 56-SC120) is an open cluster located in the constellation Mensa which is part of the Large Magellanic Cloud. It was discovered by John Herschel on December 23, 1834. Its apparent magnitude is 12.2, and its size is 0.50 arc minutes.
