= Eta Mensae =

Star in the constellation Mensa

- Location of η Mensae (circled)

Observation data Epoch J2000.0 Equinox J2000.0 (ICRS)
- Constellation: Mensa
- Right ascension: 04^{h} 55^{m} 11.20309^{s}
- Declination: −74° 56′ 12.6705″
- Apparent magnitude (V): 5.47

Characteristics
- Evolutionary stage: red giant branch
- Spectral type: K4 III
- U−B color index: +1.82
- B−V color index: +1.52

Astrometry
Proper motion (μ)	RA: +28.27 mas/yr Dec.: +61.52 mas/yr
Parallax (π)	5.0299±0.0998 mas
Distance	650 ± 10 ly (199 ± 4 pc)
Absolute magnitude (M_{V})	−1.08

Details
Mass	1.97 M_{☉}
Radius	62 R_{☉}
Luminosity	616 L_{☉}
Surface gravity (log g)	1.15 cgs
Temperature	4,055 K
Metallicity [Fe/H]	−0.17 dex
Age	1.2 Gyr

Other designations
- η Men, CPD−75°290, FK5 1138, HD 32440, HIP 22871, HR 1629, SAO 256145

Database references
SIMBAD	data

Eta Mensae, Latinized from η Mensae, is the Bayer designation for a solitary, orange-hued star in the southern constellation of Mensa. This object has an apparent visual magnitude of 5.47, which is sufficiently luminous to be faintly visible to the naked eye. Based upon an annual parallax shift of 4.88 mas as seen from Earth, this star is located roughly 670 light years from the Sun.

This is an evolved K-type giant star with a stellar classification of K4 III. It is radiating 616 times the Sun's luminosity from its photosphere at an effective temperature of 4,055 K. The star displays an infrared excess that suggests the presence of circumstellar dust. Eta Mensae is a probable member of the stream of stars associated with the Hyades cluster.
