= PKS 0637−752 =

Quasar in the constellation Mensa

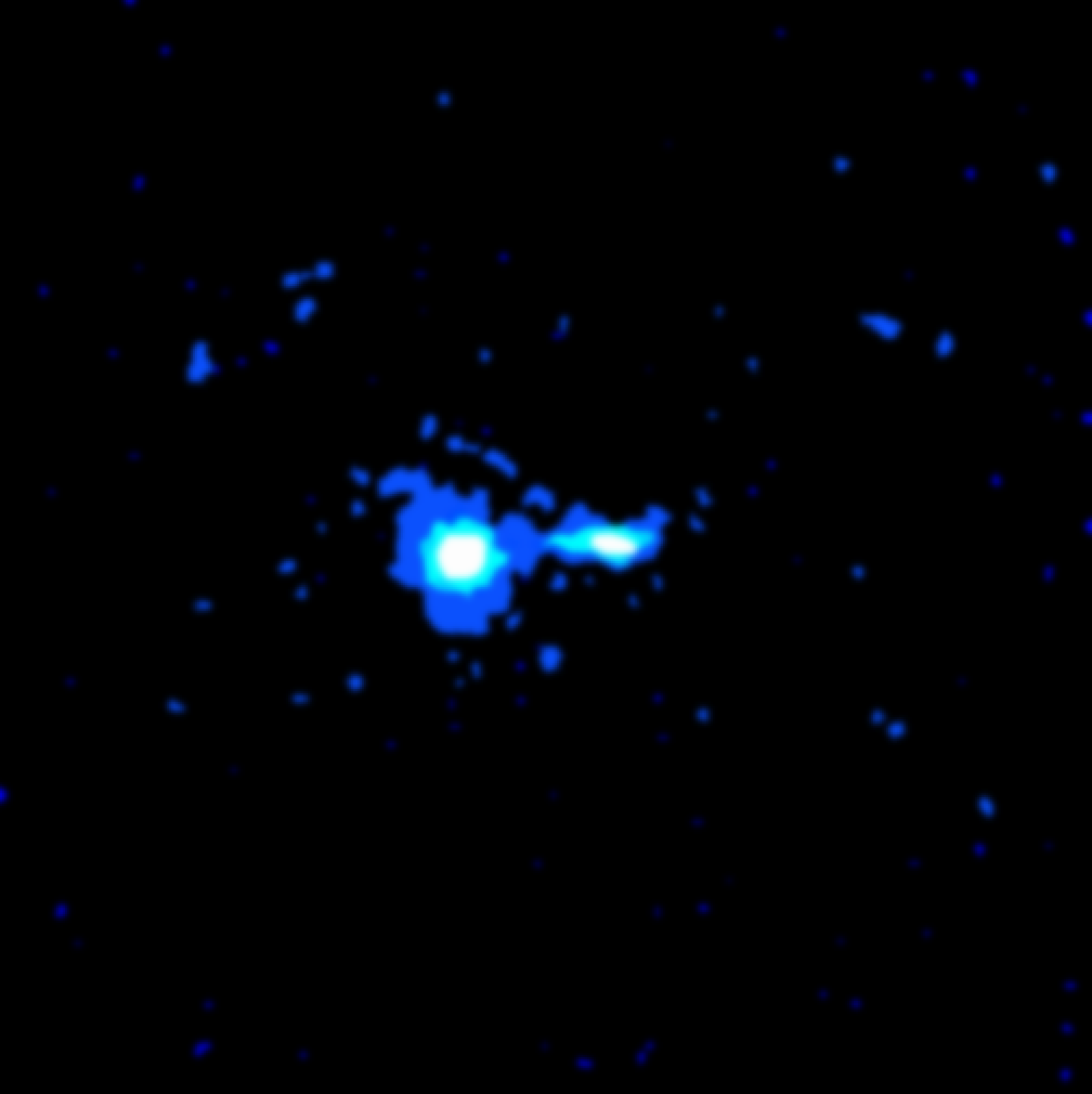
- Chandra X-ray Observatory image of PKS 0637−752

Observation data (J2000.0 epoch)
- Constellation: Mensa
- Right ascension: 06^{h} 35^{m} 46.5^{s}
- Declination: −75° 16′ 16.8″
- Redshift: 0.653000
- Heliocentric radial velocity: 195,765 km/s
- Distance: 6.0 Gly
- Apparent magnitude (V): 0.34
- Apparent magnitude (B): 0.26

Characteristics
- Type: FRSQ, Blazar
- Notable features: X-ray jet

Other designations
- IRAS F06374−7513, PGC 2824867, MRC 0637−752, 2E 1720, OCARS 0637−752

PKS 0637−752 is a quasar located six billion light years in the constellation of Mensa. It is noted for having a bright and largest astrophysical jet at redshift of z = 0.651. Discovered by Einstein Observatory in 1980 through X-rays, PKS 0637−752 was the first celestial object to be observed by Chandra X-ray Observatory upon its commissioning on July 23, 1999.

== Characteristics ==
PKS 0637−752 contains an active galactic nucleus. It is classified a blazar, a type of an active galaxy with a relativistic jet pointing towards Earth's direction. Like other quasars, PKS 0637−752 is considered luminous, powering up 10 trillion times the sun, with a supermassive black hole in its center.

=== X-ray jet ===
PKS 0637−752 contains a high γ-ray flux X-ray jet studied by Hubble Space Telescope and Spitzer. The jet extends ≥100 kiloparsecs wide and has a luminosity of ~10^{44.6} ergs^{−1}. It produces X-ray emission through inverse Compton scattering from the cosmic microwave background.

Further observations from Hubble also found three small knots occurring concurrently with the X-ray emission and peak radio. According to observations made by Australia Telescope Compact Array, these knots are shown to be quasi-periodic with a separation gap of ~1.1 arcsecs. Using two class models, astronomers calculated the jet power of PKS 0637−752 to be Q ~ 10^{46} erg/s and the jet engine modulation to be 2 × 10^{3} yr < \tau <3 × 10^{5} yr. Such evidence, proves the jet structure in the quasar might result from an unstable accretion disk, causing limit cycle behavior.
