= Alpha Mensae =

Star in the constellation Mensa

α Mensae
- Location of α Mensae (circled)

Observation data Epoch J2000 Equinox ICRS
- Constellation: Mensa
- A
- Right ascension: 06^{h} 10^{m} 14.47261^{s}
- Declination: −74° 45′ 10.9585″
- Apparent magnitude (V): 5.09
- B
- Right ascension: 06^{h} 10^{m} 13.76410^{s}
- Declination: −74° 45′ 10.12.0029″

Characteristics
- Evolutionary stage: main sequence
- Spectral type: G7 V + M3.5-6.5 V
- U−B color index: 0.33
- B−V color index: 0.72

Astrometry

A
Radial velocity (R_{v})	+36.06±0.12 km/s
Proper motion (μ)	RA: +121.596 mas/yr Dec.: −212.411 mas/yr
Parallax (π)	97.9158±0.0573 mas
Distance	33.31 ± 0.02 ly (10.213 ± 0.006 pc)
Absolute magnitude (M_{V})	5.03

B
Proper motion (μ)	RA: 96.5 mas/yr Dec.: -195.927 mas/yr
Parallax (π)	97.8666±0.0898 mas
Distance	33.33 ± 0.03 ly (10.218 ± 0.009 pc)

Details

α Men A
Mass	0.964±0.037 M_{☉}
Radius	0.960±0.013 R_{☉}
Luminosity	0.81±0.02 L_{☉}
Surface gravity (log g)	4.459±0.006 cgs
Temperature	5,569±50 K
Metallicity [Fe/H]	0.11±0.05 dex
Rotational velocity (v sin i)	0.6±0.6 km/s
Age	6.2±1.4 Gyr

α Men B
Mass	0.169±0.006 M_{☉}
Radius	0.19±0.01 R_{☉}
Temperature	3,054±44 K

Other designations
- Hoerikwaggo, α Men, CD−74°294, FK5 239, GJ 231, HD 43834, HIP 29271, HR 2261, SAO 256274, LTT 2490

Database references
SIMBAD	A
- B
Exoplanet Archive	data
ARICNS	data

Alpha Mensae, also named Hoerikwaggo, is the brightest star in the constellation Mensa. At a magnitude of 5.09, it is the dimmest lucida (a constellation's brightest star) in the sky, and the second-faintest star labeled "alpha", after Alpha Octantis. Due to its declination, on Earth it is best visible from higher latitudes of the southern hemisphere, yet can also be seen, though low in the sky, from just north of the Equator when near its daily arc's highest point, the culmination. It is 33 light-years away from the Solar System. Alpha Mensae is a G-type main sequence star, forming a binary star system with a red dwarf companion.

== Nomenclature ==
α Mensae (Latinised as Alpha Mensae, abbreviated to α Men or Alpha Men) is the star's Bayer designation. It had no traditional proper name. The IAU Working Group on Star Names approved the name Hoerikwaggo for Alpha Mensae A on 12 December 2024 and it is now so entered in the IAU Catalog of Star Names. It is named after Table Mountain in South Africa, which the constellation Mensa represents; Hoerikwaggo is the Afrikaans form of the Khoekhoe name Huriǂoaxa.

== Properties ==
This star has a stellar classification of G7 V, indicating that it is a G-type main sequence star that is generating energy by fusing hydrogen into helium at its core. It is of similar size but slightly cooler than the Sun, with 96.4% of the mass, 96% of the radius, and 81% of the Sun's luminosity. The effective temperature of the stellar atmosphere is 5,569 K, and it has a slightly higher (129%) proportion of elements other than hydrogen and helium—what astronomers call the star's metallicity—compared to the Sun. The estimated age of this star is 6.2 billion years, and is rotating at a relatively leisurely projected rotational velocity of 0.6 km/s.

Located 33 light-years distant from the Sun, Alpha Mensae has a relatively high proper motion across the sky. It has already made its closest approach to the Sun, coming within about 10 ly (3.2 pc) around 250,000 years ago. It has a red dwarf companion star at an angular separation of 3.05 arcseconds; equivalent to a projected separation of roughly 30 AU. With a mass just 16.9% that of the Sun, the companion is fully convective.

== Search for planets ==
A candidate infrared excess was detected around this star, which would indicate the presence of a circumstellar disk at a radius of over 147 AU. The derived temperature of this dust is below 22 K. However, data from Herschel Space Observatory failed to confirm this excess, leaving the finding in doubt.

A 2023 study found evidence for a candidate planet around Alpha Mensae via Doppler spectroscopy. Its period is close to one Earth year, raising concerns that it might be an instrumental false positive; further observations are needed to confirm it.

The Alpha Mensae A planetary system
Companion (in order from star)	Mass	Semimajor axis (AU)	Orbital period (days)	Eccentricity	Inclination (°)	Radius
(unconfirmed)	≥54.52+11.29 −9.14 M_{🜨}	—	359.5±1.2	0.4±0.14	—	—
