= NGC 1987 =

Star cluster in the constellation Mensa

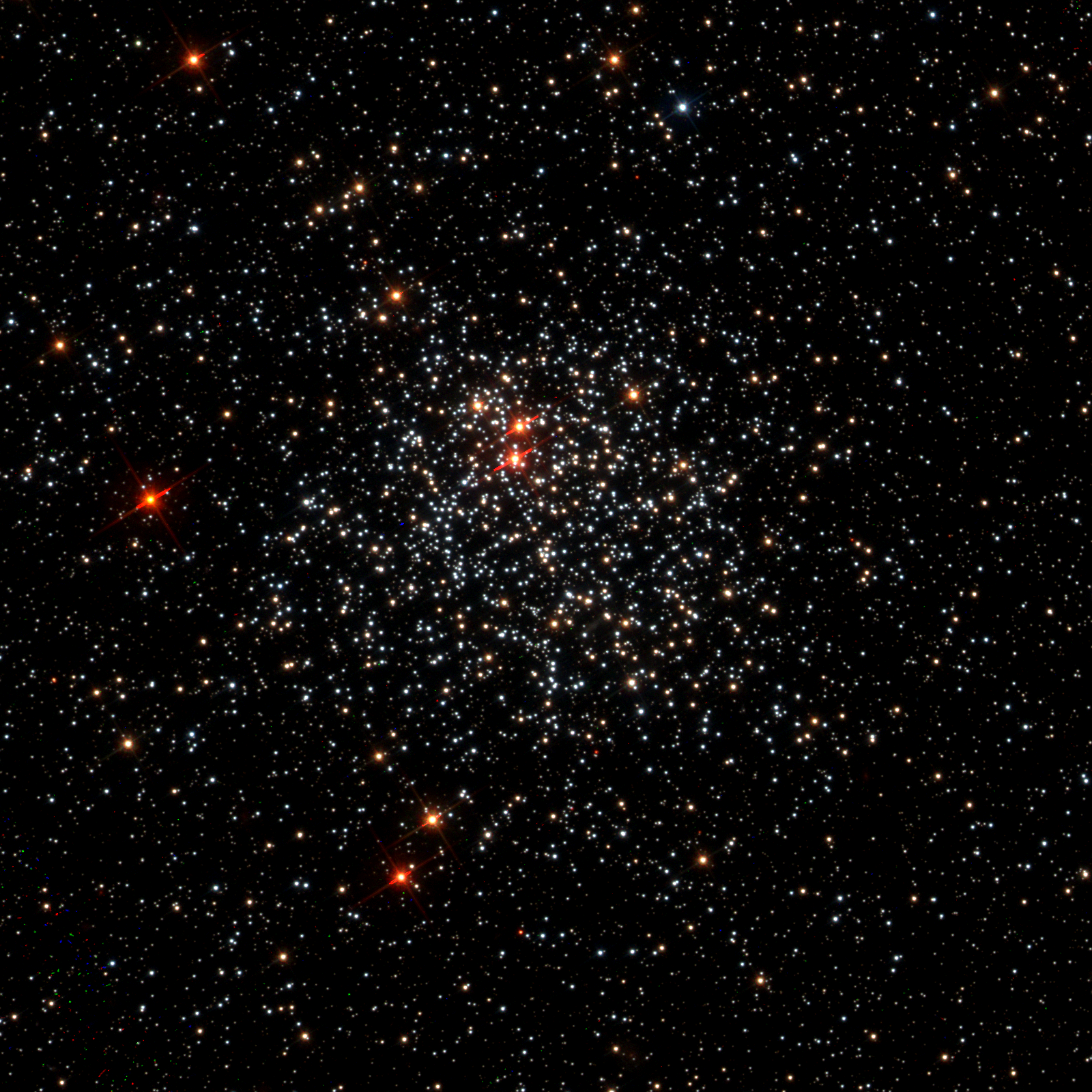
- NGC 1987, imaged by the Hubble Space Telescope

Observation data (J2000 epoch)
- Right ascension: 05^{h} 27^{m} 17.2^{s}
- Declination: −70° 44′ 15″
- Apparent magnitude (V): 12.1

Physical characteristics
- Other designations: ESO 56-SC131, GC 1190, h 2885

Associations
- Constellation: Mensa

NGC 1987 (also known as ESO 56-SC131) is an open cluster or a globular cluster located in the constellation Mensa and part of the Large Magellanic Cloud. It was discovered by John Herschel on November 3, 1834. Its apparent magnitude is 12.1, and its size is 1.7 arc minutes. It is thought to be around 600 million years old and has a significant number of red ageing stars.
