= TZ Mensae =

Algol type binary in the constellation Mensa

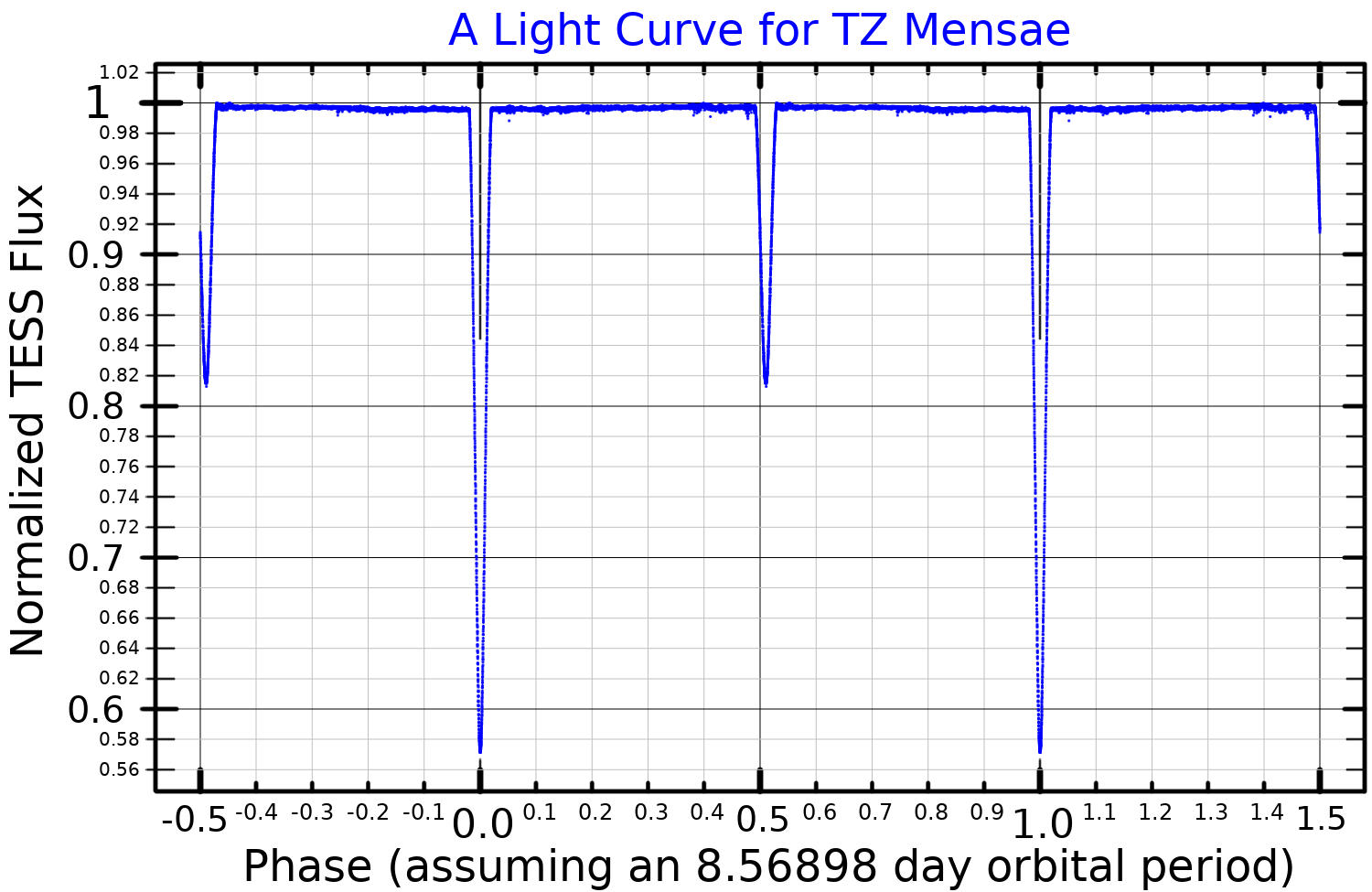
- A light curve for TZ Mensae plotted from TESS data

Observation data Epoch J2000.0 Equinox ICRS
- Constellation: Mensa
- Right ascension: 05^{h} 30^{m} 13.8827^{s}
- Declination: −84° 47′ 06.366″
- Apparent magnitude (V): 6.19 to 6.87

Characteristics
- U−B color index: −0.11
- B−V color index: −0.02
- Variable type: Algol variable

A
- Spectral type: A0 V

B
- Spectral type: A8 V

Astrometry
Radial velocity (R_{v})	−0.3±0.9 km/s
Proper motion (μ)	RA: −6.242 mas/yr Dec.: +43.141 mas/yr
Parallax (π)	8.0907±0.0381 mas
Distance	403 ± 2 ly (123.6 ± 0.6 pc)
Absolute magnitude (M_{V})	+0.93 (combined)

Orbit
Primary	A
Name	B
Period (P)	8.569 d
Semi-major axis (a)	0.13 AU
Eccentricity (e)	0.035±0.007
Inclination (i)	88.73°
Periastron epoch (T)	2442403.7085
Argument of periastron (ω) (secondary)	295°
Semi-amplitude (K_{1}) (primary)	62.2 km/s
Semi-amplitude (K_{2}) (secondary)	102.8 km/s

Details

A
Mass	2.49±0.02 M_{☉}
Radius	1.90±0.02 R_{☉}
Luminosity	39.8^{+7}_{−6} L_{☉}
Surface gravity (log g)	4.22±0.01 cgs
Temperature	10,543^{+421}_{−405} K
Rotational velocity (v sin i)	16±4 km/s

B
Mass	1.50±0.01 M_{☉}
Radius	1.40±0.01 R_{☉}
Luminosity	4.57^{+0.8}_{−0.7} L_{☉}
Surface gravity (log g)	4.30±0.01 cgs
Temperature	7178^{+303}_{−291} K
Rotational velocity (v sin i)	12 km/s
Metallicity [Fe/H]	−0.12±0.05 dex
Age	141±3 Myr

Other designations
- 31 G. Mensae, TZ Men, CD−84°63, CPD−84°75, FK5 1659, GC 7134, HD 39780, HIP 25776, HR 2059, SAO 258418

Database references
SIMBAD	data

TZ Mensae is a binary star in the southern circumpolar constellation Mensa. The system has a combined maximum apparent magnitude of 6.19, placing it near the limit for naked eye visibility. Parallax measurements place the system at a distance of 403 light years. The radial velocity is small.

The components of TZ Mensae have stellar classifications of A0 V and A8 V, both indicating that they are ordinary A-type main-sequence stars. They have masses of 1.5 and 2.5 M_{☉}, and radii of 1.4 and 1.9 R_{☉}, respectively. The primary has an effective temperature of 10,543 K and a luminosity 40 times that of the Sun (L_{☉}). As for the companion, it has a temperature of 7,178 K. and a luminosity less than five L_{☉} The rotation of both stars is apparently synchronous with the orbital period, with projected rotational velocities of 12 and 16 km/s respectively. The system is estimated to be 141 million years old.

The two components take about 8 days to revolve around each other in a relatively circular orbit. Since the inclination is close to 90° (actually 88.7°), the two stars periodically pass in front of one another and it has been classified as a eclipsing binary, specifically the Algol type. If the brighter component is eclipsing the dimmer one, the brightness drops to 6.36. If vice versa, it drops to 6.87, which is below the limit for naked eye visibility.
