= YY Mensae =

Star in the constellation of Mensa

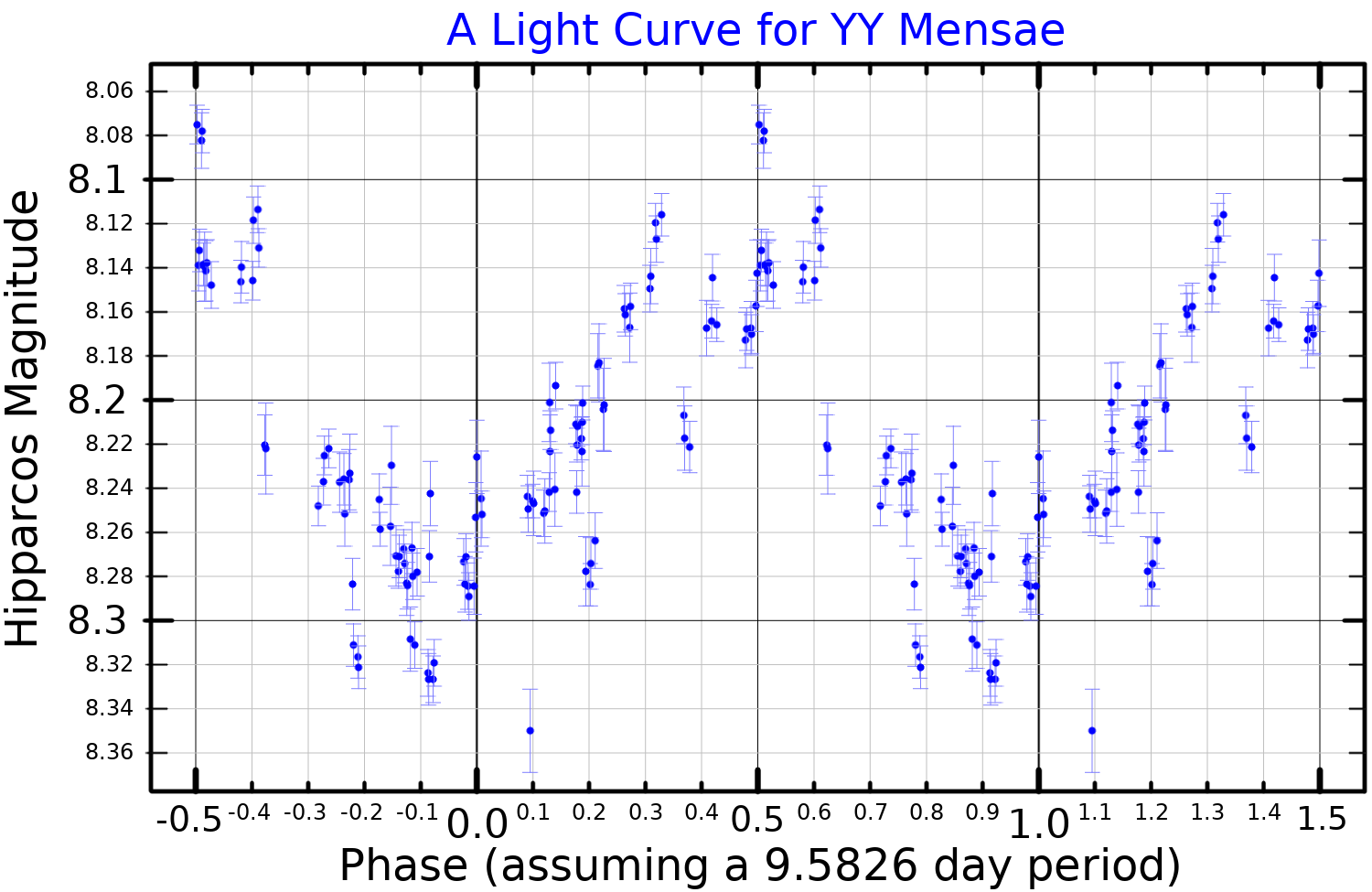
- A light curve for YY Mensae, plotted from Hipparcos data

Observation data Epoch J2000.0 Equinox ICRS
- Constellation: Mensa
- Right ascension: 04^{h} 58^{m} 17.93697^{s}
- Declination: −75° 16′ 37.9879″
- Apparent magnitude (V): 8.60 - 8.89

Characteristics
- Spectral type: K1 III/IVe
- U−B color index: +0.70
- B−V color index: +1.04
- Variable type: FK Com

Astrometry
Radial velocity (R_{v})	−8.5±2.5 km/s
Proper motion (μ)	RA: −4.149 mas/yr Dec.: −3.077 mas/yr
Parallax (π)	4.5587±0.0161 mas
Distance	715 ± 3 ly (219.4 ± 0.8 pc)
Absolute magnitude (M_{V})	+0.81

Details
Mass	0.983 M_{☉}
Radius	12.3 R_{☉}
Luminosity	68.5 L_{☉}
Surface gravity (log g)	1.63 cgs
Temperature	4,691±128 K
Metallicity [Fe/H]	−0.59 dex
Rotational velocity (v sin i)	45±2 km/s

Other designations
- YY Men, CD−75°189, CPD−75°292, HD 32918, HIP 23106

Database references
SIMBAD	data

YY Mensae, also known as HD 32918, is a variable star located in the southern circumpolar constellation Mensa. It has an apparent magnitude that fluctuates between 8.6 and 8.9, which is within the visibility of binoculars. Based on parallax measurements from Gaia DR3, it is estimated to be 715 light years distant. It appears to be approaching the Solar System with a heliocentric radial velocity of −8.5 km/s.

This star was known to have an unusual spectrum since the 1970s, but its variability wasn't observed until the 1980's. Collier (1982) found it to be a FK Comae Berenices variable, a class of rapidly rotating giant stars. After a few additional years of observations, HD 32918 was given the variable star designation YY Mensae. A paper in 1987 observed a long and powerful flare coming from the star. X-ray emissions from YY Mensa have been detected in its corona, which may be a result of its fast rotation.

YY Mensae has a stellar classification of K1 III/IVe, indicating an evolved red giant with the blended luminosity class of a giant star and a subgiant. It is chromospherically active and emission lines are also present in its spectra. It has 98% the mass of the Sun but has expanded to 12.3 times its girth. It radiates 68.5 times the luminosity of the Sun from its photosphere at an effective temperature of 4,691 K, giving it an orange hue. Typical for stars its type, YY Mensae spins rapidly, having a projected rotational velocity of 45 km/s. The star is metal deficient, having an iron abundance only 26% that of the Sun.
