= Alpha Octantis =

Binary star system in the constellation Octans

- Location of α Octantis (circled in red)

Observation data Epoch J2000.0 Equinox J2000.0 (ICRS)
- Constellation: Octans
- Right ascension: 21^{h} 04^{m} 43.06347^{s}
- Declination: −77° 01′ 25.5735″
- Apparent magnitude (V): 5.13

Characteristics
- Evolutionary stage: Main sequence
- Spectral type: F4III + F5III
- U−B color index: +0.13
- B−V color index: +0.490±0.008
- Variable type: EB

Astrometry
Radial velocity (R_{v})	85.9±1.5 km/s
Proper motion (μ)	RA: +22.5215 mas/yr Dec.: −369.325 mas/yr
Parallax (π)	22.5215±0.0955 mas
Distance	144.8 ± 0.6 ly (44.4 ± 0.2 pc)
Absolute magnitude (M_{V})	1.93±0.02

Orbit
Period (P)	9.073 d
Eccentricity (e)	0.39
Periastron epoch (T)	2,435,302.404
Argument of periastron (ω) (secondary)	276°
Semi-amplitude (K_{1}) (primary)	47 km/s
Semi-amplitude (K_{2}) (secondary)	47 km/s

Details

A
Mass	1.9 M_{☉}
Radius	2.0 R_{☉}
Luminosity	7 L_{☉}
Temperature	6,700 K
Age	1.1 Gyr

B
Mass	2 M_{☉}
Radius	2.0 R_{☉}
Luminosity	7 L_{☉}
Temperature	6,700 K
Age	1.1 Gyr

Other designations
- α Oct, CD−77°1053, CPD−77°1474, FK5 787, GC 29343, HD 199532, HIP 104043, HR 8021, SAO 257879, PPM 374864, LTT 8327, NLTT 50332

Database references
SIMBAD	data

Alpha Octantis is a binary star system in the constellation of Octans. The name is Latinized from α Octantis. Despite being labeled the "alpha" star by Lacaille, it is not the brightest star in the constellation—that title belongs to Nu Octantis. It is also the faintest "alpha" star overall, with Alpha Mensae a close second. It is visible to the naked eye as a faint, yellow-white-hued point of light with an overall apparent visual magnitude of approximately 5.13. The system is located approximately 148 light-years away from the Sun based on parallax.

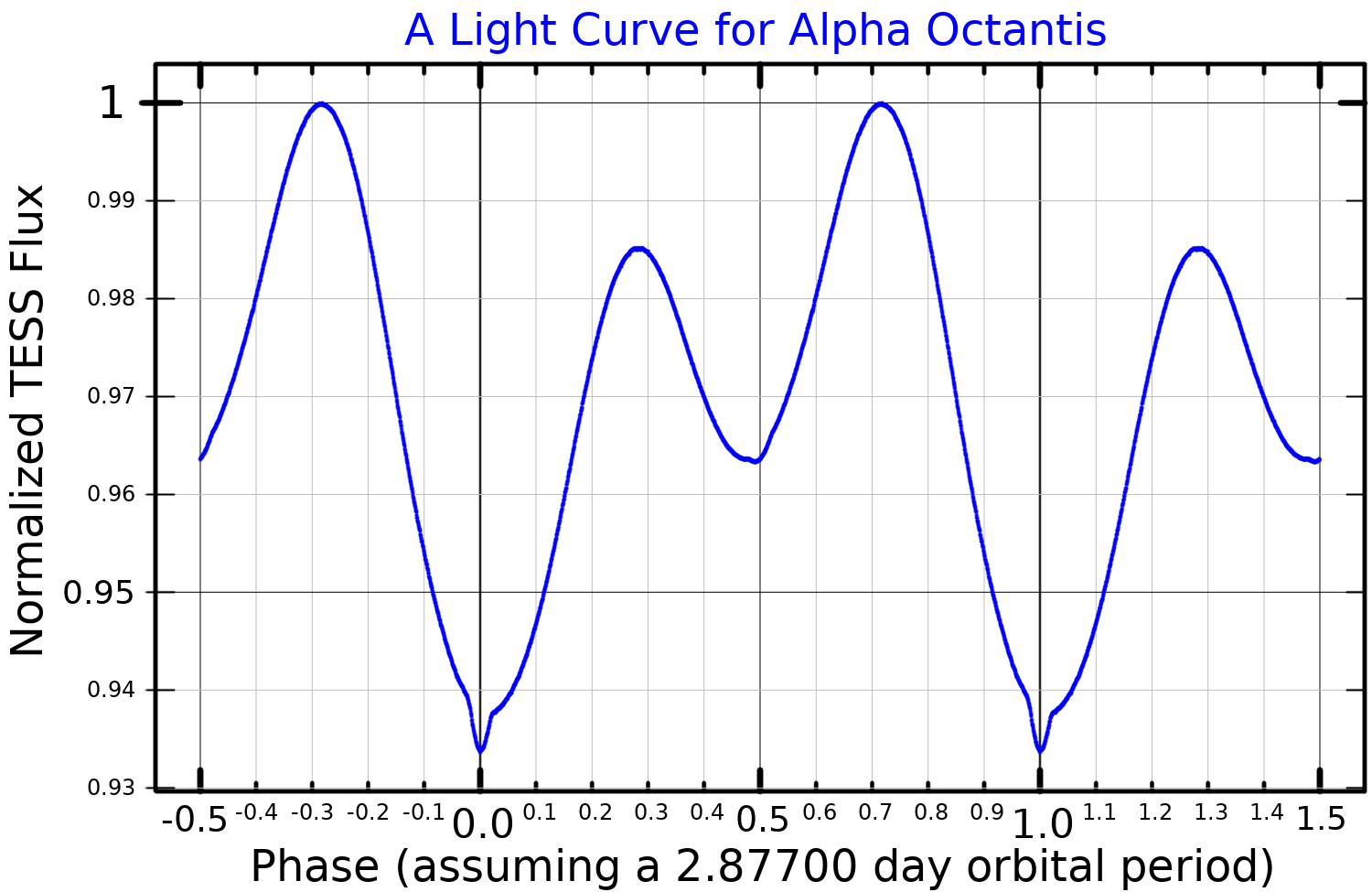
A light curve for Alpha Octantis plotted from TESS data

This is a double-lined spectroscopic binary star which consists of two similar main sequence stars, each with spectral type F, orbiting each other with a period of just over 9 days and an eccentricity of 0.39. The pair form a Beta Lyrae-type eclipsing binary system, dropping by magnitude 0.04 during the primary eclipse. This system is a bright X-ray source with a luminosity of 22.78×10^{29} ergs s^{−1}. The system displays an infrared excess suggesting the presence of a debris disk; with a temperature of 219 K and is orbiting at a distance of 9.8 AU from its host star.
