= Gamma Mensae =

Astrometric binary star system in the constellation Mensa

γ Mensae
- Location of γ Mensae (circled)

Observation data Epoch J2000 Equinox ICRS
- Constellation: Mensa
- Right ascension: 05^{h} 31^{m} 52.8525856360^{s}
- Declination: −76° 20′ 27.246061076″
- Apparent magnitude (V): 5.19

Characteristics
- Spectral type: K2 III
- U−B color index: +1.18
- B−V color index: +1.13

Astrometry
| Radial velocity (R_{v}) | +56.7±0.8 km/s |
| Proper motion (μ) | RA: +140.646 mas/yr Dec.: +269.6340 mas/yr |
| Parallax (π) | 30.5956±0.2189 mas |
| Distance | 106.6 ± 0.8 ly (32.7 ± 0.2 pc) |
| Absolute magnitude (M_{V}) | +2.70 |

Orbit
| Period (P) | 7.455±4.857 yr |
| Semi-major axis (a) | 51±10″ |
| Eccentricity (e) | 0.59±0.15 |
| Inclination (i) | 53±8° |
| Longitude of the node (Ω) | 117±90° |
| Periastron epoch (T) | 1995.111±4.085 |
| Argument of periastron (ω) (secondary) | 124±74° |

Details

γ Men A
| Mass | 1.04 M_{☉} |
| Radius | 4.99 R_{☉} |
| Luminosity | 21 L_{☉} |
| Surface gravity (log g) | 2.76 cgs |
| Temperature | 4,491 K |
| Metallicity [Fe/H] | +0.22 dex |
| Age | 10.60 Gyr |

Other designations
- γ Men, CD−76°222, HD 37763, HIP 25918, HR 1953, SAO 256201

Database references
| SIMBAD | data |

Gamma Mensae, Latinized from γ Mensae, is an orange-hued star system in the southern constellation of Mensa. The apparent visual magnitude of 5.19 indicates it is dimly visible to the naked eye. Based upon an annual parallax shift of 7.70 mas as seen from the Earth, it is about 102 light years from the Sun. At that distance, the visual magnitude is diminished by an extinction factor of 0.033 due to interstellar dust. The system shows the high velocity kinematic properties of a population II star, but has Sun-like abundances of most elements.

This is a probable astrometric binary system with poorly constrained orbital elements. The visible member, component A, is an evolved K-type giant star with a stellar classification K2 III At about 10.6 billion years of age, it has nearly the same mass as the Sun but has expanded to five times the Sun's radius. The star shines with 21 times the Sun's luminosity from its enlarged photosphere at an effective temperature of 4,491 K.
