= Zeta Mensae =

Star in the constellation Mensa

- Location of ζ Mensae (circled)

Observation data Epoch J2000.0 Equinox J2000.0 (ICRS)
- Constellation: Mensa
- Right ascension: 06^{h} 40^{m} 02.89197^{s}
- Declination: −80° 48′ 48.9391″
- Apparent magnitude (V): +5.64

Characteristics
- Spectral type: A5 III
- U−B color index: +0.15
- B−V color index: +0.20

Astrometry
Radial velocity (R_{v})	+7.0±7.4 km/s
Proper motion (μ)	RA: −4.801 mas/yr Dec.: +53.158 mas/yr
Parallax (π)	8.2879±0.0870 mas
Distance	394 ± 4 ly (121 ± 1 pc)
Absolute magnitude (M_{V})	+0.09

Details
Radius	4.65±0.27 R_{☉}
Luminosity	66.39±0.86 L_{☉}
Temperature	7,555±43 K
Rotational velocity (v sin i)	200 km/s

Other designations
- ζ Men, CPD−80°196, FK5 264, HD 50506, HIP 31897, HR 2559, SAO 258451

Database references
SIMBAD	data

Zeta Mensae, Latinized from ζ Mensae, is a solitary, white-hued star in the southern constellation of Mensa. It is faintly visible to the naked eye, having an apparent visual magnitude of +5.64. Based upon an annual parallax shift of 8.2879 mas as seen from GAIA, it is located around 394 light years from the Sun. At that distance, the visual magnitude is diminished by an extinction factor of 0.088 due to interstellar dust. Eggen (1995) listed it as a proper motion candidate for membership in the IC 2391 supercluster.

The stellar classification of A5 III suggests this is an A-type giant star. It is spinning rapidly, showing a projected rotational velocity of 200 km/s, giving the star an oblate shape with an equatorial bulge that is an estimated 26% larger than the polar radius. The star is radiating about 69 times the Sun's luminosity from its photosphere at an effective temperature of around 7,555 K. It displays a faint infrared excess at a wavelength of 18μm, indicating that it is being orbited by a debris disk.
