= AO Mensae =

Star in the constellation Mensa

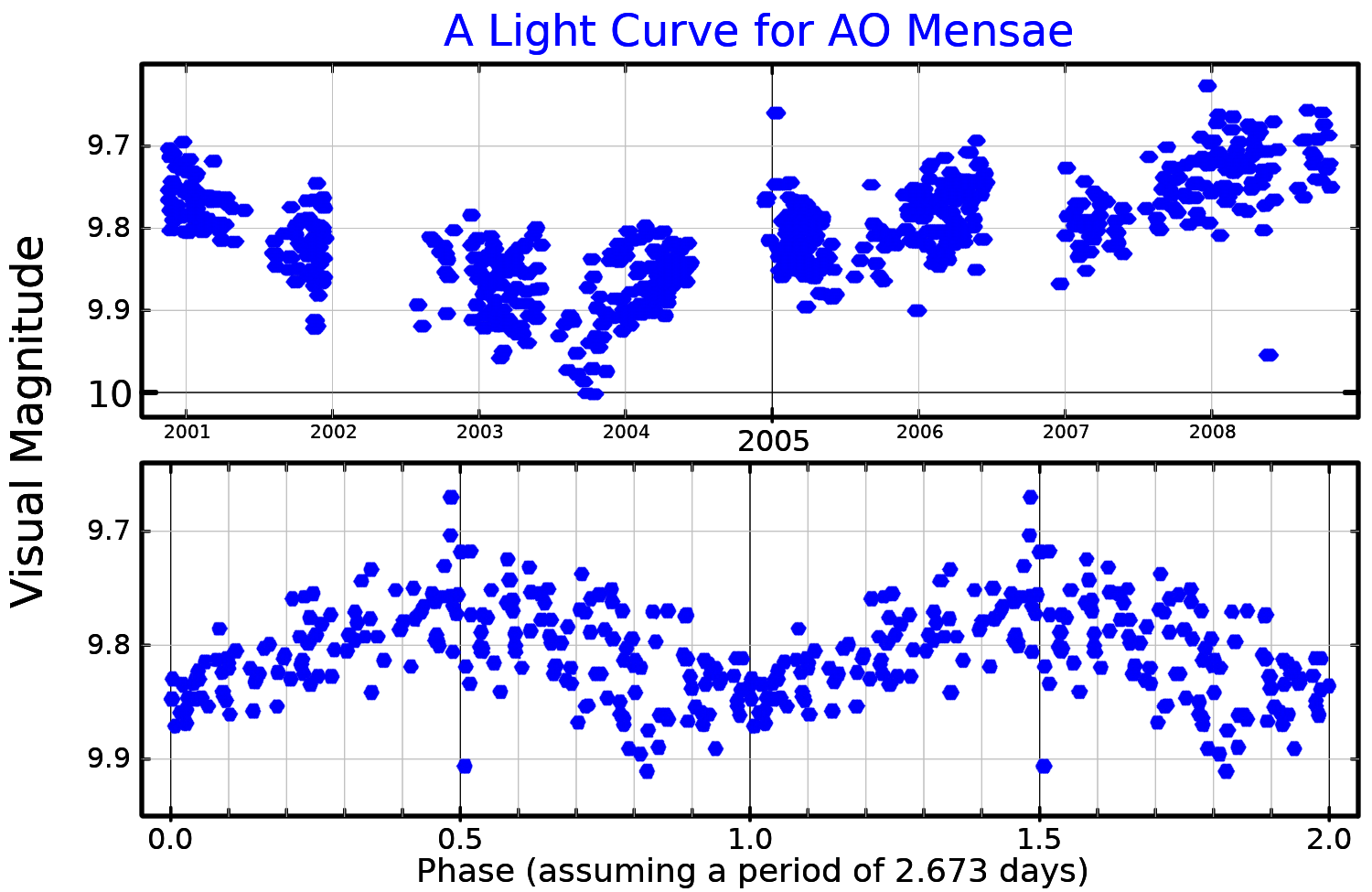
- A visual band light curve for AO Mensae, adapted from Kiraga (2012)

Observation data Epoch J2000 Equinox J2000
- Constellation: Mensa
- Right ascension: 06^{h} 18^{m} 28.20850^{s}
- Declination: −72° 02′ 41.4464″
- Apparent magnitude (V): 9.96 to 10.18

Characteristics
- Spectral type: K4Ve
- B−V color index: +1.13
- Variable type: BY Dra

Astrometry
Radial velocity (R_{v})	+16.2±1.0 km/s
Proper motion (μ)	RA: −7.908 mas/yr Dec.: +74.295 mas/yr
Parallax (π)	25.4695±0.0254 mas
Distance	128.1 ± 0.1 ly (39.26 ± 0.04 pc)
Absolute magnitude (M_{V})	7.02

Details
Mass	0.69 M_{☉}
Radius	0.91±0.29 R_{☉}
Luminosity	0.26 L_{☉}
Surface gravity (log g)	4.38 cgs
Temperature	4,384±59 K
Metallicity [Fe/H]	0.24 dex
Rotation	2.673 d
Rotational velocity (v sin i)	16.4 km/s
Age	23±3 Myr

Other designations
- AO Men, CD−71°333, CPD−71° 427, HD 45081, HIP 29964

Database references
SIMBAD	data

AO Mensae is a single variable star in the southern circumpolar constellation of Mensa. It is too faint to be viewed with the naked eye, having an apparent visual magnitude that ranges from 9.96 down to 10.18. The star is 128 light years distant from the Sun based on parallax, and is drifting further away with a radial velocity of +16 km/s. It is a member of the Beta Pictoris moving group, a loose association of young stars moving through the galaxy.

This is an orange-hued K-type main-sequence star with a stellar classification of K4Ve, where the 'e' suffix indicates emission features in the spectrum. It is young star and an X-ray source, one of the brightest such X-ray emitters in the solar neighborhood, and is categorized as a BY Draconis variable, although there is some uncertainty in this assignment. It is spinning with a period of 2.7 days and is about 23 million years old. The star has 69% of the mass of the Sun and 91% of the Sun's radius. It is radiating 26% of the luminosity of the Sun on average, at an effective temperature of 4,384 K.
