= TU Mensae =

Star in the constellation Mensa

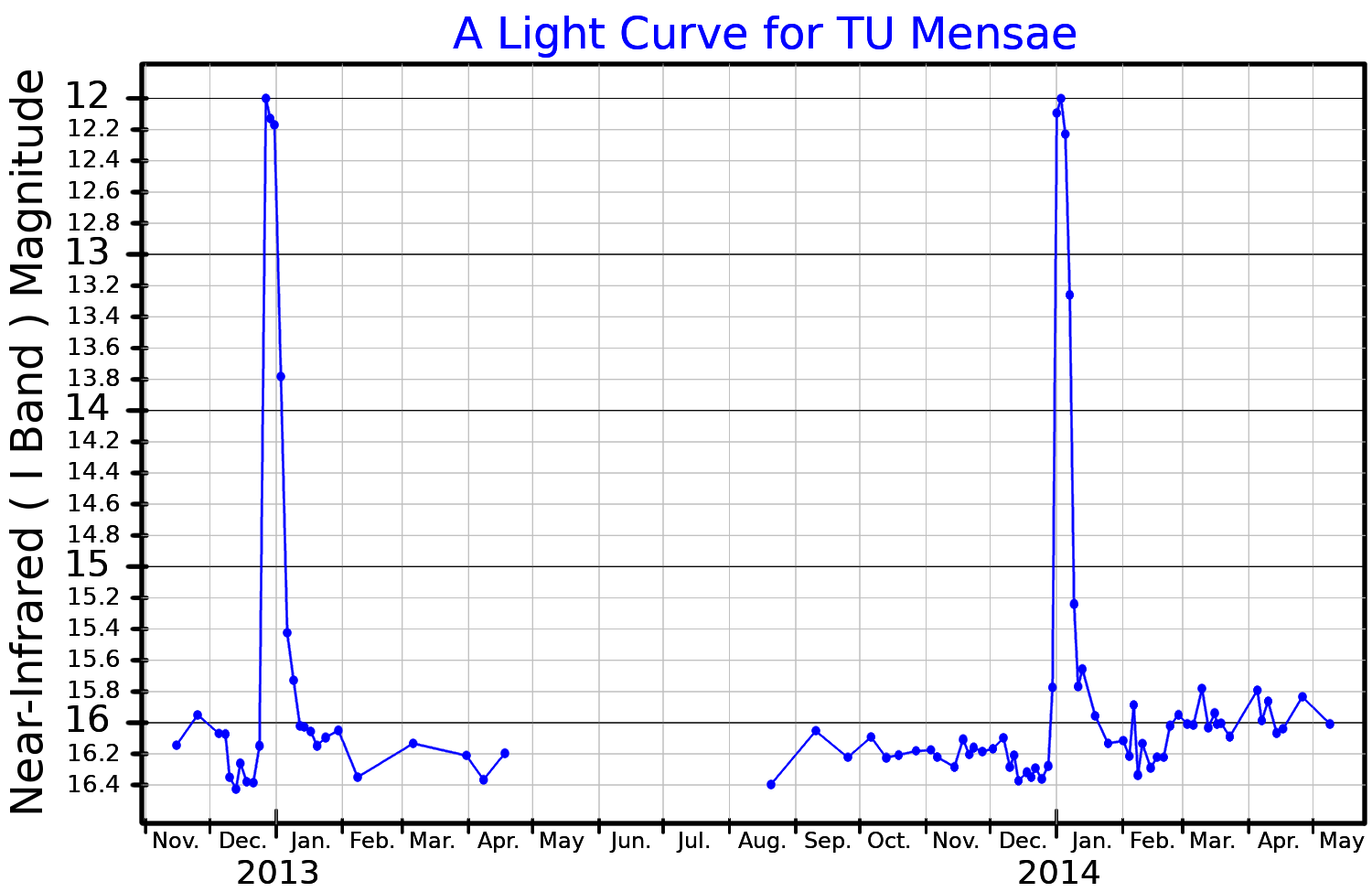
- A near-infrared (I band) light curve for TU Mensae, plotted from OGLE data published by Mróz et al. (2015)

Observation data Epoch J2000 Equinox ICRS
- Constellation: Mensa
- Right ascension: 04^{h} 41^{m} 40.7062^{s}
- Declination: –76° 36′ 45.940″
- Apparent magnitude (V): 18.6 (11.8)

Astrometry
| Proper motion (μ) | RA: 8.431 ± 0.128 mas/yr Dec.: 26.318 ± 0.155 mas/yr |
| Parallax (π) | 3.5979±0.0647 mas |
| Distance | 910 ± 20 ly (278 ± 5 pc) |

Other designations
- WEB 4201, 2MASS J04414069-7636458

Database references
| SIMBAD | data |

TU Mensae is a cataclysmic variable star of (SU Ursae Majoris subtype) in the constellation Mensa. A close binary, it consists of a white dwarf and low-mass star orbiting each other in 2 hours 49 minutes. The stars are close enough that the white dwarf strips material off the other star, creating an accretion disc that periodically ignites with a resulting brightening of the system. These result in an increase in brightness lasting around a day every 37 days. Brighter outbursts, known as superhumps, last 5-20 days and take place every 194 days. The properties of TU Mensae have been difficult to calculate, as the calculated mass ratio between the two stars mean there should not be superhumps.

TU Mensae has an apparent magnitude of 18.6 when quiescent, brightening to 11.8 in outburst. The companion star has been calculated to be a red dwarf of spectral type M4V, and the white dwarf has an estimated mass around 80% that of the Sun. The orbital period is one of the longest for cataclysmic variable systems exhibiting superhumps.
