= Beta Mensae =

Star in the constellation Mensa

β Mensae
- Location of β Mensae (circled)

Observation data Epoch J2000.0 Equinox J2000.0 (ICRS)
- Constellation: Mensa
- Right ascension: 05^{h} 02^{m} 42.99847^{s}
- Declination: −71° 18′ 51.4765″
- Apparent magnitude (V): 5.31

Characteristics
- Spectral type: G8 III
- U−B color index: +0.77
- B−V color index: +1.00

Astrometry
Radial velocity (R_{v})	−11.40 km/s
Proper motion (μ)	RA: −4.368 mas/yr Dec.: +10.815 mas/yr
Parallax (π)	4.9368±0.0810 mas
Distance	660 ± 10 ly (203 ± 3 pc)
Absolute magnitude (M_{V})	−1.62

Details
Mass	3.58 M_{☉}
Radius	25.85+0.69 −0.62 R_{☉}
Luminosity	345±7 L_{☉}
Surface gravity (log g)	2.54±0.11 cgs
Temperature	5,088±44 K
Metallicity [Fe/H]	+0.00±0.04 dex
Age	270 Myr

Other designations
- β Men, CPD−71°309, FK5 2380, GC 6232, HD 33285, HIP 23467, HR 1677, SAO 256154, PPM 368632

Database references
SIMBAD	data

Beta Mensae, Latinized from β Mensae, is the third-brightest star in the constellation of Mensa. Despite this, it is only faintly visible to the naked eye, appearing as a dim, yellow-hued point of light with an apparent visual magnitude of 5.31. The star is positioned near the southwest edge of the Large Magellanic Cloud, but it does not form part of this much more distant satellite galaxy. Based upon an annual parallax shift of just 4.11 mas as seen from the Earth, the star is located at a distance of roughly 790 light years from the Sun. It is moving closer with a heliocentric radial velocity of −11 km/s.

This is a solitary, G-type giant star with a stellar classification of G8 III. It is around 270 million years old with 3.6 times the mass of the Sun. Having exhausted the supply of hydrogen at its core, it has expanded to 26 times the Sun's radius. Beta Mensae is radiating 513 times the Sun's luminosity from its photosphere at an effective temperature of about 5,088 K.
