= Mensa (constellation) =

Constellation in the southern celestial hemisphere

- Constellation
- List of stars in Mensa
- Abbreviation: Men
- Genitive: Mensae
- Pronunciation: /ˈmɛnsə/ genitive: /ˈmɛnsiː/
- Symbolism: the Table Mountain
- Right ascension: 03^{h} 12^{m} 55.9008^{s}–07^{h} 36^{m} 51.5289^{s}
- Declination: −71°–−85.5°
- Quadrant: SQ1
- Area: 153 sq. deg. (75th)
- Main stars: 4
- Bayer/Flamsteed stars: 16
- Stars brighter than 3.00^{m}: 0
- Stars within 10.00 pc (32.62 ly): 1
- Brightest star: α Men (Hoerikwaggo) (5.09^{m})
- Nearest star: LDS 169 (L 32-8+L 32-9)
- Messier objects: 0
- Meteor showers: 0
- Bordering constellations: Chamaeleon; Dorado; Hydrus; Octans; Volans
- Visible at latitudes between +4° and −90°. Best visible at 21:00 (9 p.m.) during the month of January.

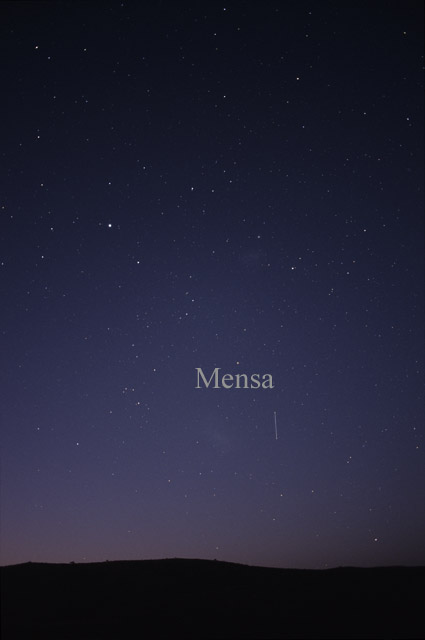
The constellation Mensa as seen by the naked eye

Mensa is a constellation in the Southern Celestial Hemisphere near the south celestial pole, one of fourteen constellations drawn up in the 18th century by French astronomer Nicolas-Louis de Lacaille. Its name is Latin for table, though it originally commemorated Table Mountain and was known as "Mons Mensae". One of the eighty-eight constellations designated by the International Astronomical Union (IAU), it covers a keystone-shaped wedge of sky 153.5 square degrees in area. Other than the south polar constellation of Octans, it is the most southerly of constellations and is observable only south of the 5th parallel of the Northern Hemisphere.

The faintest constellation in the night sky recognized by the IAU, Mensa contains no apparently bright stars—the brightest, Alpha Mensae, is barely visible in suburban skies. Part of the Large Magellanic Cloud, several star clusters and a quasar lie in the area covered by the constellation, and at least three of its star systems have been found to have exoplanets.

== History ==
Originally named "Montagne de la Table" or "Mons Mensae", Mensa was created by Nicolas-Louis de Lacaille out of dim Southern Hemisphere stars in honor of Table Mountain, a South African mountain overlooking Cape Town, near the location of Lacaille's observatory. He recalled that the Magellanic Clouds were sometimes known as Cape clouds, and that Table Mountain was often covered in clouds when a southeasterly stormy wind blew. Hence he made a "table" in the sky under the clouds. Lacaille had observed and catalogued 10,000 southern stars during a two-year stay at the Cape of Good Hope. He devised 14 new constellations in uncharted regions of the Southern Celestial Hemisphere not visible from Europe. Mensa was the only constellation that did not honor an instrument symbolic of the Age of Enlightenment. Sir John Herschel proposed shrinking the name to one word in 1844, noting that Lacaille himself had abbreviated some of his constellations thus.

Although the stars of Mensa do not feature in any ancient mythology, the mountain it is named after has a rich mythology. Called "Tafelberg" in Dutch and German, it has two neighboring mountains called "Devil's Peak" and "Lion's Head". Table Mountain features in the mythology of the Cape of Good Hope, notorious for its storms. Explorer Bartolomeu Dias saw the mountain as a mythical anvil for storms.

== Characteristics ==
Mensa is bordered by Dorado to the north, Hydrus to the northwest and west, Octans to the south, Chamaeleon to the east and Volans to the northeast. Covering 153.5 square degrees and 0.372% of the night sky, it ranks 75th of the 88 constellations in size. The three-letter abbreviation for the constellation, as adopted by the IAU in 1922, is "Men". The official constellation boundaries, as set by Belgian astronomer Eugène Delporte in 1930, are defined by a polygon of eight segments. In the equatorial coordinate system, the right ascension coordinates of these borders lie between 03^{h} 12^{m} 55.9008^{s} and 07^{h} 36^{m} 51.5289^{s}, while the declination coordinates are between −69.75° and −85.26°. The whole constellation is visible to observers south of latitude 5°N. (Note: While parts of the constellation technically rise above the horizon to observers between 5°N and 20°N, stars within a few degrees of the horizon are practically unobservable.)

== Features ==
=== Stars ===
==== Bright stars ====
Lacaille gave eleven stars in the constellation Bayer designations, using the Greek alphabet to label them Alpha through to Lambda Mensae (excluding Kappa). Gould later added Kappa, Mu, Nu, Xi and Pi Mensae. Stars as dim as these were not generally given designations; however, Gould felt their closeness to the South Celestial Pole warranted their naming. Alpha Mensae is the brightest star with a barely visible apparent magnitude of 5.09, making it the only constellation with no star above magnitude 5.0. Overall, there are 22 stars within the constellation's borders brighter than or equal to apparent magnitude 6.5. (Note: Objects of magnitude 6.5 are among the faintest visible to the unaided eye in suburban–rural transition night skies.)

- Alpha Mensae is a solar-type star (class G7V) 33.32 ± 0.02 light-years from Earth. It came to within 11 light-years from Earth around 250,000 years ago and would have been considerably brighter back then—nearly of second magnitude. An infrared excess has been detected around this star, indicating the presence of a circumstellar disk at a radius of over 147 astronomical units (AU). The estimated temperature of this dust is below 22 K. However, data from Herschel Space Observatory failed to confirm this excess, leaving the finding in doubt. No planetary companions have yet been discovered around it. It has a red dwarf companion star at an angular separation of 3.05 arcseconds; equivalent to a projected separation of roughly 30 AU.
- Gamma Mensae is the second-brightest star in the constellation, at magnitude 5.19. Located 104.9 ± 0.5 light-years from Earth, it is an ageing (10.6 billion year-old) star around 1.04 times as massive as the Sun. It has swollen to around 5 times the solar radius, becoming an orange giant of spectral type K2III.
- Beta Mensae is slightly fainter at magnitude 5.31. Located 660 ± 10 light-years from Earth, it is a yellow giant of spectral type G8III, around 3.6 times as massive and 513 times as luminous as the Sun. It is 270 million years old, and lies in front of the Large Magellanic Cloud.
- Zeta and Eta Mensae have infrared excesses suggesting they too have circumstellar disks of dust. Zeta Mensae is an ageing white giant of spectral type A5 III around 394 ± 4 light-years from Earth, and Eta Mensae is an orange giant of spectral type K4 III, lying 650 ± 10 light-years away from Earth.
- Pi Mensae is a solar-type (G1) star 59.62 ± 0.07 light-years distant. In 2001, a substellar companion was discovered in an eccentric orbit. Incorporating more accurate Hipparcos data yields a mass range for the companion to be anywhere from 10.27 to 29.9 times that of Jupiter. This confirms its substellar nature with the upper limit of mass putting it in the brown dwarf range. The discovery of a second substellar companion—a super-Earth—was announced on 16 September 2018. It takes 6.27 days to complete its orbit and is the first exoplanet detected by the Transiting Exoplanet Survey Satellite (TESS) submitted for publication.

==== Planet-hosting stars ====
- HD 38283 (Bubup) is a Sun-like star of spectral type F9.5V of magnitude 6.7, located 124.3 ± 0.1 light-years distant. In 2011, a gas giant with an Earth-like orbital period of 363 days and a minimum mass a third that of Jupiter was discovered by the radial velocity method.
- HD 39194 is an orange dwarf of spectral type K0V and magnitude 8.08, located 86.21 ± 0.09 light-years distant. Three planets in close orbit were discovered by the High Accuracy Radial Velocity Planet Searcher (HARPS) in 2011. The three take 5.6, 14 and 34 days to complete an orbit around their star, and have minimum masses 3.72, 5.94 and 5.14 times that of the Earth respectively.

==== Variable stars ====
- TZ Mensae is an eclipsing binary that varies between magnitude 6.2 and 6.9 every 8.57 days. It is composed of two white main sequence stars in close orbit. One of these is of spectral type A0V, has a radius twice as that of the Sun and is 2.5 times as massive. The other, an A8V spectral type, has a radius 1.4 times that of the Sun and is 1.5 times as massive.
- UX Mensae is another eclipsing binary system composed of two young stars around 1.2 times as massive as the Sun and 2.2 ± 0.5 billion years of age, orbiting each other every 4.19 days. The system is 338.2 ± 0.9 light-years distant.
- TY Mensae is another eclipsing binary system classified as a W Ursae Majoris variable; the two components are so close that they share a common envelope of stellar material. The larger star has been calculated to be 1.86 times as massive, have 1.85 times the diameter and is 13.6 times as luminous, while the smaller is 0.4 times as massive, 0.84 times the diameter, and 1.7 times as luminous as the Sun. Their surface temperatures have been calculated at 8164 and 7183 K respectively.
- YY Mensae is an orange giant of spectral type K1III around 2.2 times as massive as the Sun, with 12.7 times its diameter and 70 times its luminosity. A rapidly rotating star with a period of 9.5 days, it is a strong emitter of X-rays and belongs to a class of star known as FK Comae Berenices variables. These stars are thought to have formed with the merger of two stars in a contact binary system. With an apparent magnitude of 8.05, it is 707 ± 6 light-years distant.
- AH Mensae is a cataclysmic variable star system composed of a white dwarf and a red dwarf that orbit each other every 2 hours 57 minutes. The stars are close enough that the white dwarf strips material off the red dwarf, creating an accretion disc that periodically ignites with a resulting brightening of the system.

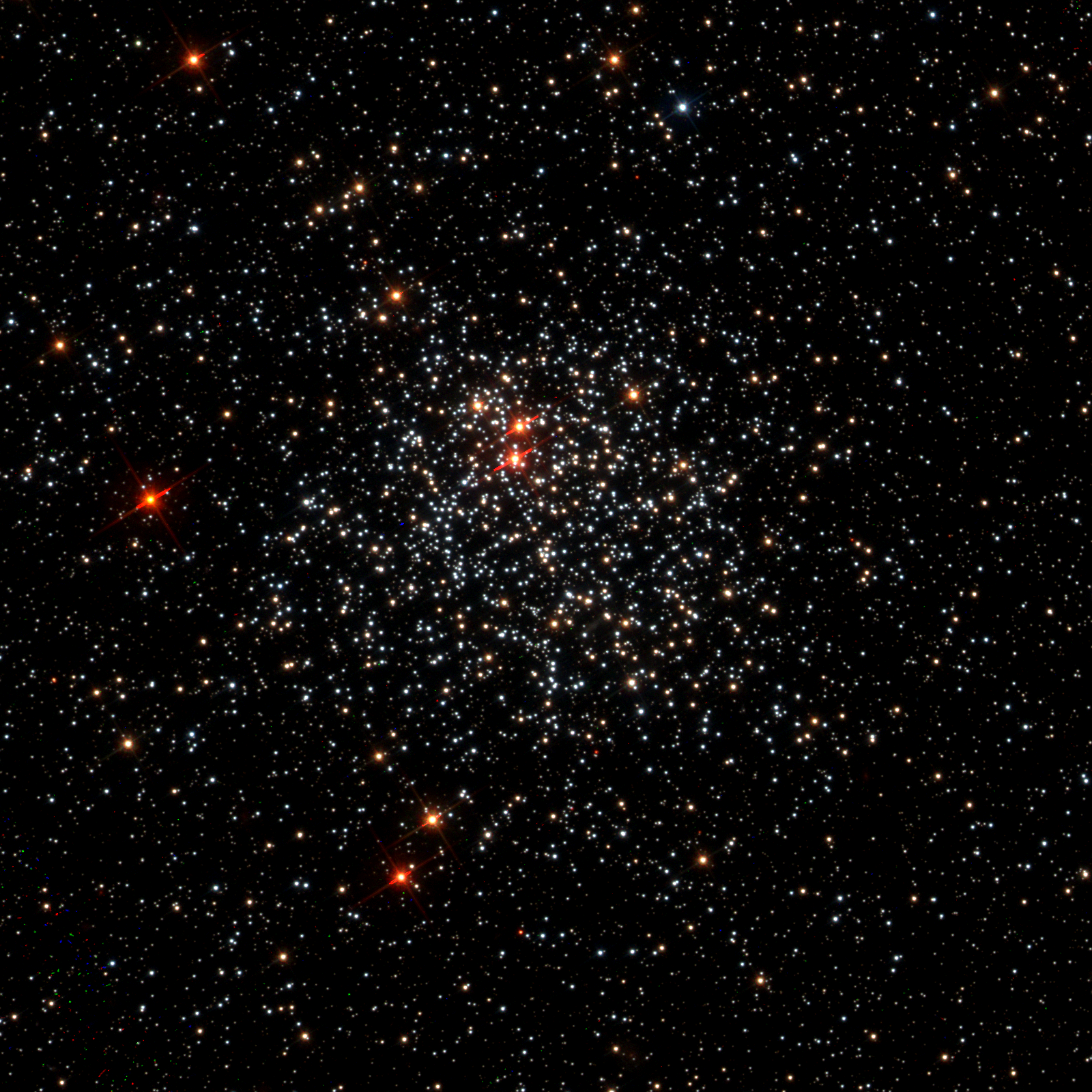
NGC 1987 imaged by the Hubble Space Telescope

- TU Mensae is another cataclysmic variable composed of a red dwarf and white dwarf. The orbital period of 2 hours 49 minutes is one of the longest for cataclysmic variable systems exhibiting brighter outbursts, known as superhumps. The normal outbursts result in an increase in brightness lasting around a day every 37 days, while the superhumps last 5–20 days and take place every 194 days.
- AO Mensae is a faint star of magnitude 9.8. An orange dwarf that has 80% the size and mass of the Sun, it is also a BY Draconis variable. These are a class of stars with starspots prominent enough that the star changes brightness as it rotates. It is a member of the Beta Pictoris moving group, a loose association of young stars moving across the galaxy.

==== Other stars ====
- WISE 0535−7500 is a binary system composed of two sub-brown dwarfs of spectral class cooler than Y1 located 47 ± 3 light-years away. Unable to be separated by observations to date, they are presumed to be of similar mass—8 to 20 times that of Jupiter—and are less than one AU apart.

=== Deep-sky objects ===
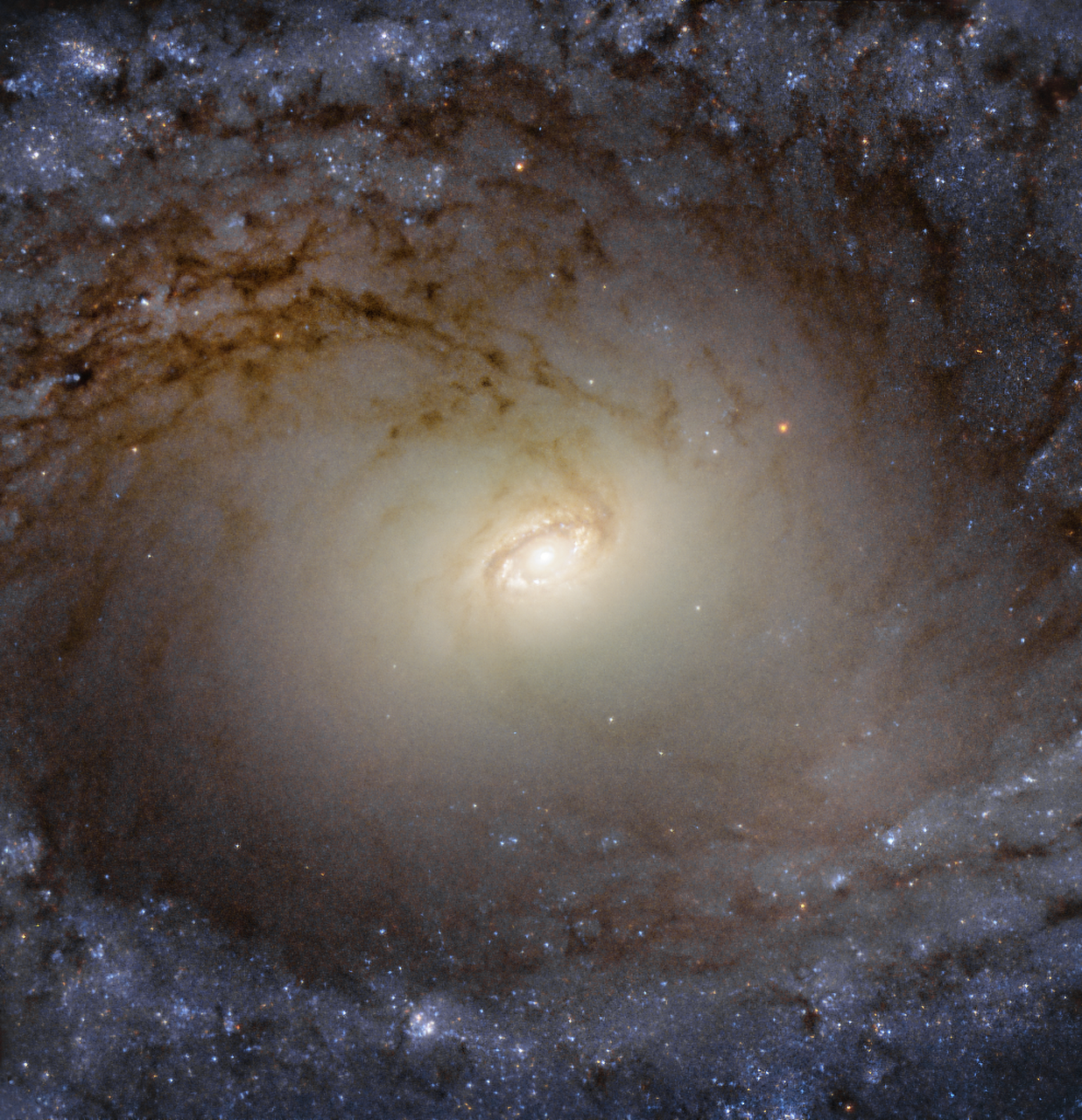
IC 2051 is a spiral galaxy located in Mensa.

The Large Magellanic Cloud lies partially within Mensa's boundaries, although most of it lies in neighbouring Dorado. It is a satellite galaxy of the Milky Way, located at a distance of 163,000 light-years. Among its stars within Mensa are W Mensae, an unusual yellow-white supergiant that belongs to a rare class of star known as a R Coronae Borealis variable, HD 268835, a blue hypergiant that is girded by a vast circumstellar disk of dust, and R71, a luminous blue variable star that brightened in 2012 to over a million times as luminous as the Sun. Also within the galaxy is NGC 1987, a globular cluster estimated to be around 600 million years old that has a significant number of red ageing stars, and NGC 1848, a 27 million year old open cluster. Mensa contains several described open clusters, most of which can be only be clearly observed from large telescopes.

PKS 0637-752 is a distant quasar with a calculated redshift of z = 0.651. It was chosen as the first target of the then newly-operational Chandra X-Ray Observatory in 1999. The resulting images revealed a gas jet approximately 330,000 light-years long. It is visible at radio, optical and x-ray wavelengths.
