= R Cassiopeiae =

Star in the constellation Cassiopeia

- Location of R Cassiopeiae (circled)

Observation data Epoch J2000.0 Equinox ICRS
- Constellation: Cassiopeia
- Right ascension: 23^{h} 58^{m} 24.868^{s}
- Declination: +51° 23′ 19.71″
- Apparent magnitude (V): 4.4 to 13.5

Characteristics
- Spectral type: M6e–L0e
- U−B color index: +0.08
- B−V color index: +1.83
- Variable type: Mira

Astrometry
Radial velocity (R_{v})	−22.94±0.72 km/s
Proper motion (μ)	RA: 82.847 mas/yr Dec.: 17.485 mas/yr
Parallax (π)	5.7423±0.2011 mas
Distance	570 ± 20 ly (174 ± 6 pc)

Details
Mass	0.59 M_{☉}
Radius	263 R_{☉}
Luminosity	8,960 L_{☉}
Surface gravity (log g)	−0.50 cgs
Temperature	2,812 K
Metallicity [Fe/H]	0.50 dex

Other designations
- R Cas, BD+50°4202, HD 224490, HIP 118188, HR 9066, SAO 35938, ADS 17135, CCDM J23584+5123

Database references
SIMBAD	data

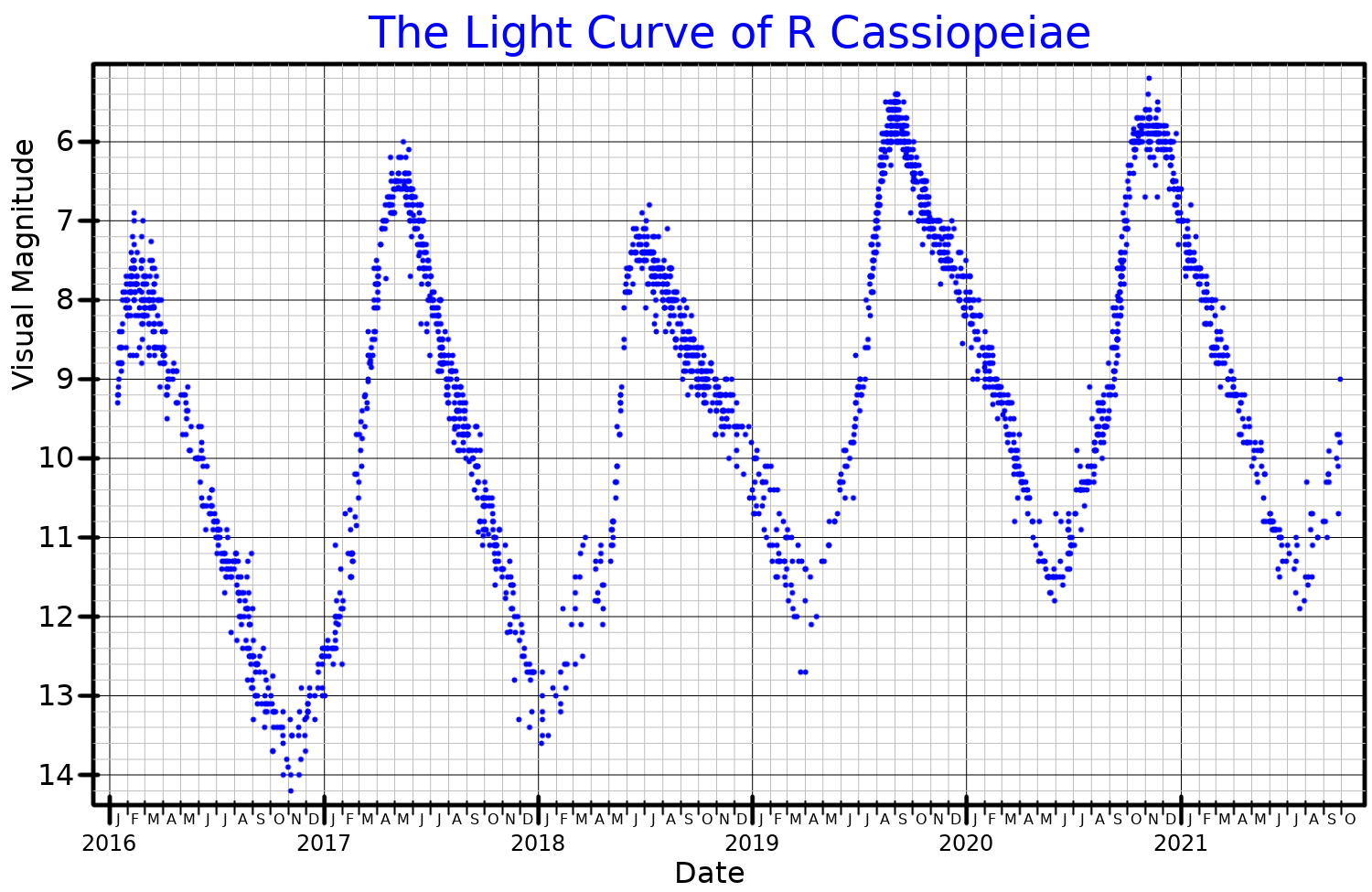
Visual band light curve of R Cassiopeiae, from AAVSO data

R Cassiopeiae is a variable star in the northern constellation of Cassiopeia. It is located approximately 570 light years distant from the Sun, but is drifting closer with a radial velocity of −23 km/s. This is a pulsating Mira-type variable star with a brightness that varies from magnitude +4.4 down to +13.5 over a period of 433.6 days. At its maximum brightness, R Cassiopeiae is visible to the naked eye as a faint, red-hued star.

Norman Robert Pogson discovered the star, in 1853. This aging red giant star has a stellar classification that varies from M6e to M10e, where the 'e' suffix indicates emission features in the spectrum. Currently on the asymptotic giant branch, it has 59% of the mass of the Sun with an oxygen rich chemical abundance. Having exhausted the supply of hydrogen at its core, the star has expanded to 263 times the Sun's radius. On average, the star is radiating 3,837 times the luminosity of the Sun from its swollen photosphere with an effective temperature ranging around 2,812 K. It is losing mass at the rate of 1.3×10^{−6} M_{☉}/yr^{−1} and is surrounded by a dusty circumstellar shell that extends out to 2.8′.

== See also ==
- S Cassiopeiae
- PZ Cassiopeiae
- TZ Cassiopeiae
