= U Andromedae =

Star in the constellation Andromeda

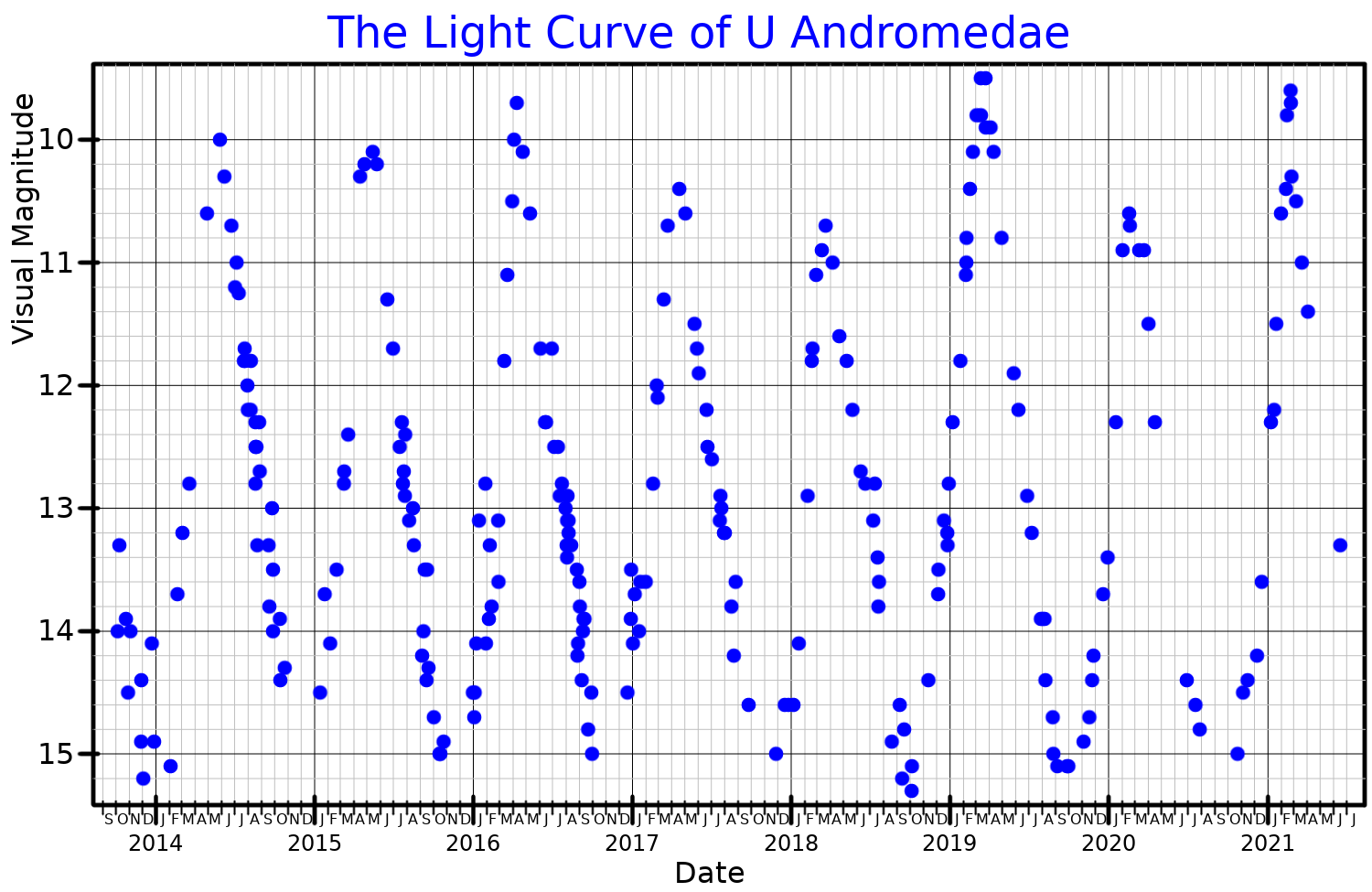
- The visual band light curve of U Andromedae, from AAVSO data

Observation data Epoch J2000 Equinox J2000
- Constellation: Andromeda
- Right ascension: 01^{h} 15^{m} 29.69623^{s}
- Declination: +40° 43′ 08.3932″
- Apparent magnitude (V): 9.0 to 15.0

Characteristics
- Spectral type: M6e
- Variable type: Mira

Astrometry
| Radial velocity (R_{v}) | −4.0±5 km/s |
| Proper motion (μ) | RA: 11.416±0.321 mas/yr Dec.: −8.392±0.297 mas/yr |
| Parallax (π) | 1.4745±0.1511 mas |
| Distance | approx. 2,200 ly (approx. 680 pc) |

Details
| Temperature | 3,288 K |

Other designations
- HD 7482, BD+39°291a, 2MASS J01152971+4043082, IRAS 01126+4027

Database references
| SIMBAD | data |

U Andromedae is a variable star in the constellation of Andromeda, at a distance of approximately 2,200 ly. It is a star of spectral type M6e and it is classified as a Mira variable.

U Andromedae is the variable star designation of this star. Its brightness varies by several magnitudes with a mean period of 347.7 d, although the exact length of each cycle is somewhat variable. Similarly, the magnitude of each maximum and minimum varies. The mean apparent magnitude is 11.6, with a mean maximum magnitude of 9.9. The brightest recorded maxima are at magnitude 9.0, and the faintest minima at magnitude 15.0. The rise to maximum brightness is faster than the fall to minimum, taking on average 40% of the period.

The large amplitude, long period, and shape of the light curve mean that U Andromedae is classified as a Mira variable, a type of pulsating asymptotic giant branch (AGB) star. It was first observed to be variable by Thomas D. Anderson during 1894 and 1895. AGB stars have exhausted both hydrogen and helium in their cores and are not massive enough to fuse carbon and oxygen, so they erratically fuse helium and hydrogen shells outside the core.
