= V Crucis =

Variable star in the constellation Crux

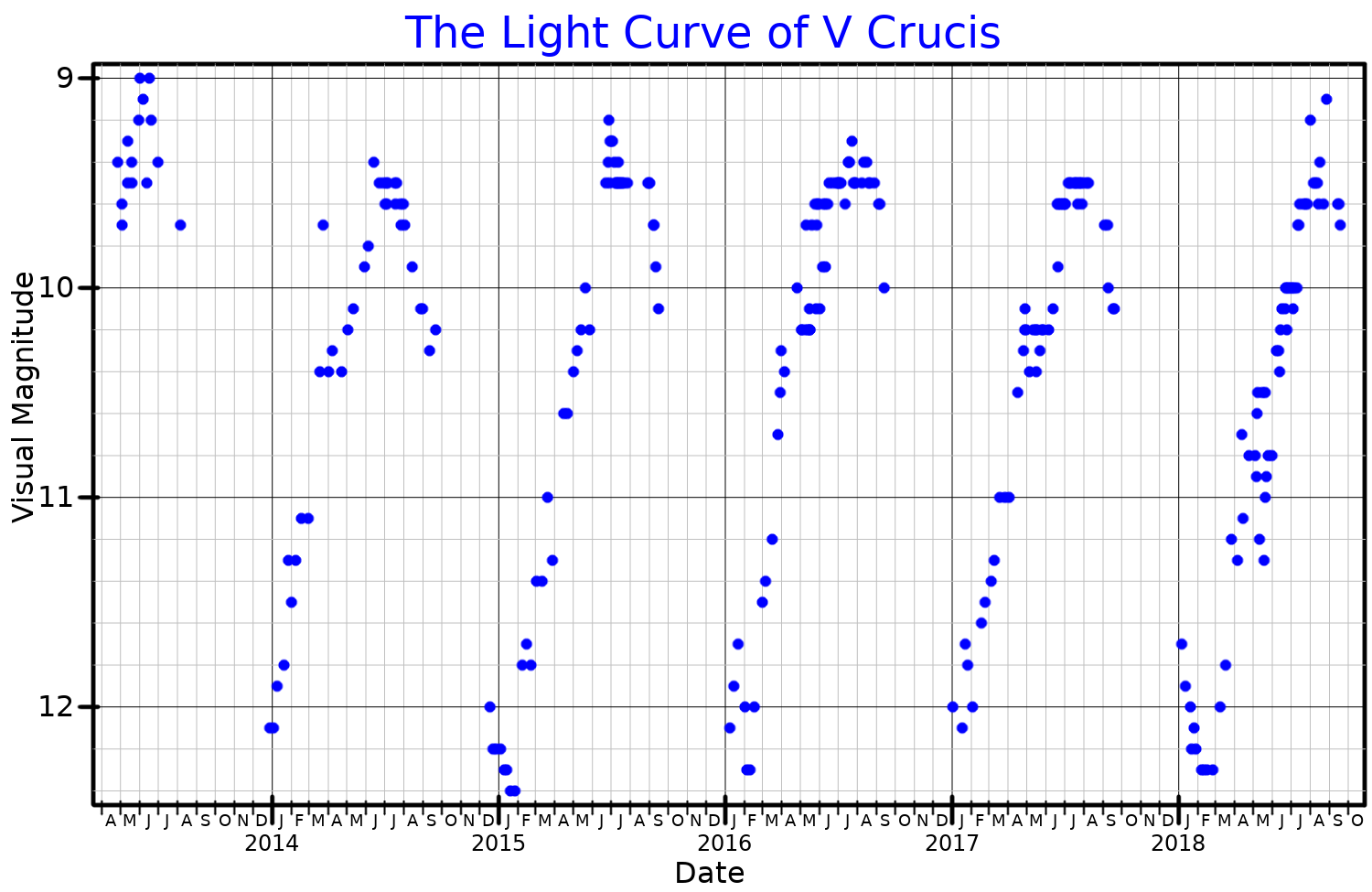
- The visual band light curve of V Crucis, from AAVSO data

Observation data Epoch J2000.0 Equinox J2000.0
- Constellation: Crux
- Right ascension: 12^{h} 56^{m} 35.559^{s}
- Declination: −57° 53′ 57.02″
- Apparent magnitude (V): 8.74 - 11.13

Characteristics
- Evolutionary stage: AGB
- Spectral type: Ce(Ne)
- Variable type: Mira

Astrometry
Radial velocity (R_{v})	−19.90 km/s
Proper motion (μ)	RA: 0.507 mas/yr Dec.: 1.989 mas/yr
Parallax (π)	0.7451±0.0475 mas
Distance	4,400 ± 300 ly (1,340 ± 90 pc)
Absolute magnitude (M_{V})	−4.67

Details
Radius	130 R_{☉}
Luminosity	7,244 L_{☉}
Temperature	3,075 K

Other designations
- V Cru, CD−57°4791, HD 112319, HIP 63175, IRAS 12536−5737, 2MASS J12563556−5753569

Database references
SIMBAD	data

V Crucis is a carbon star in the constellation Crux. A Mira variable, its apparent magnitude ranges from 8.7 to 11.1 over 376.5 days. The fact that this star's period is nearly equal to one year makes it hard to get good observational coverage over the entire cycle. Its near-infrared light curve shows a contribution from the first harmonic of the fundamental period.
