= T Cephei =

Star in the constellation Cepheus

- Region of NGC 7023, T Cephei is marked with a green arrow Credit: NASA, ESA and Digitized Sky Survey 2

Observation data Epoch J2000 Equinox ICRS
- Constellation: Cepheus
- Right ascension: 21^{h} 09^{m} 31.78348^{s}
- Declination: +68° 29′ 27.2311″
- Apparent magnitude (V): 5.2 - 11.3

Characteristics
- Evolutionary stage: AGB
- Spectral type: M6-9e
- U−B color index: +0.33
- B−V color index: +1.49
- Variable type: Mira

Astrometry
Radial velocity (R_{v})	−8.03 km/s
Proper motion (μ)	RA: −44.210 mas/yr Dec.: −44.921 mas/yr
Parallax (π)	5.4400±0.3476 mas
Distance	600 ± 40 ly (180 ± 10 pc)

Details
Mass	0.55 M_{☉}
Radius	329+70 −50 R_{☉}
Luminosity	5,700 L_{☉}
Temperature	2,400 - 3,347 K

Other designations
- T Cephei, HR 8113, HD 202012, HIP 104451, BD+67°1291, GC 29611, SAO 19229, GSC 04460-02400

Database references
SIMBAD	data

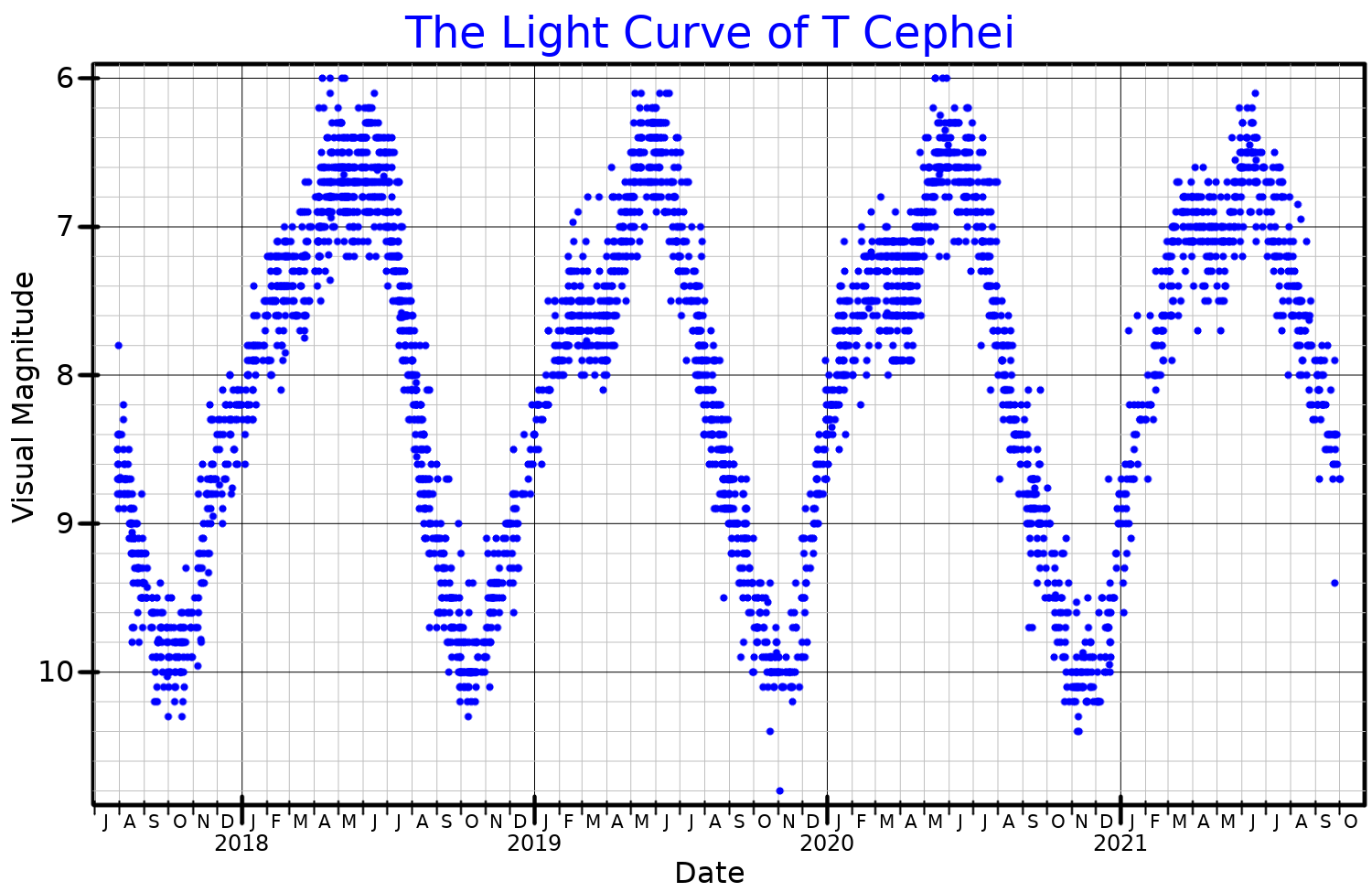
The visual band light curve of T Cephei, from AAVSO data

T Cephei is a Mira variable star in the constellation Cepheus. Located approximately 600 light-years (180 parsecs) distant, it varies between magnitudes 5.2 and 11.3 over a period of around 388 days. When it is near its maximum brightness, it is faintly visible to the naked eye under good observing conditions.

Vitold Ceraski announced his discovery that the star is a variable star, in 1879. It appeared with its variable star designation, T Cephei, in Annie Jump Cannon's 1907 publication Second catalogue of variable stars. T Cephei is a red giant of spectral type M6-9e with an effective temperature 2,400 K, a radius of 329 R_{☉}, a mass of 0.55 M_{☉}, and a luminosity of 5,700 L_{☉}. If it were in the place of the Sun, its photosphere would at least engulf the orbit of Mars. This star is believed to be in a late stage of its life, the asymptotic giant branch phase, blowing off its own atmosphere to form a white dwarf in a distant future.

== See also ==
- VV Cephei
- R Cancri
- Mira
- S Cassiopeiae
