= S Orionis =

Variable star in the constellation Orion

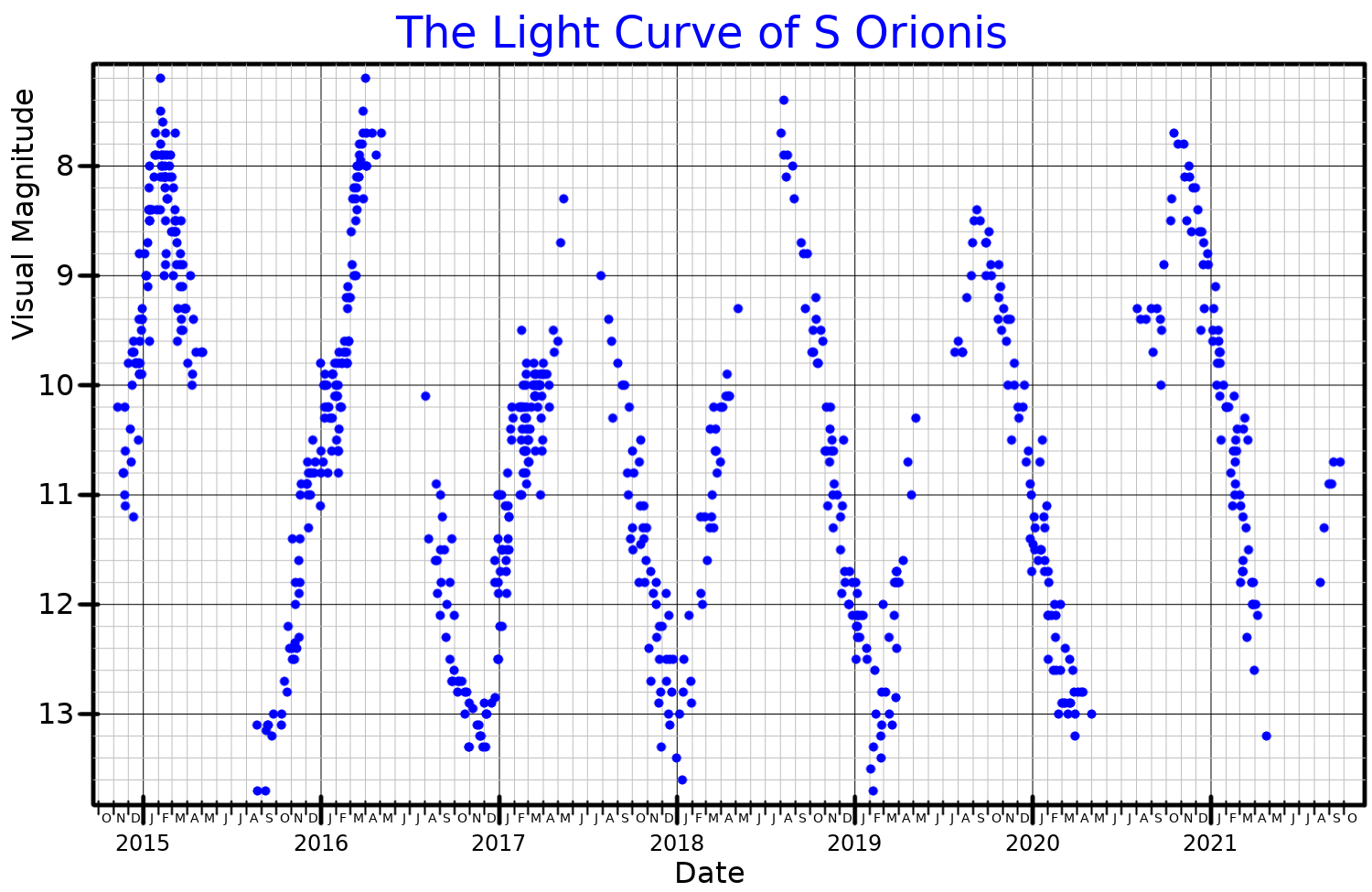
- The visual band light curve of S Orionis, from AAVSO data

Observation data Epoch J2000 Equinox ICRS
- Constellation: Orion
- Right ascension: 05^{h} 29^{m} 00.8948^{s}
- Declination: −04° 41′ 32.748″
- Apparent magnitude (V): 7.2 – 14.0

Characteristics
- Evolutionary stage: AGB
- Spectral type: M6.5e – M9.5e
- U−B color index: +0.15
- B−V color index: +1.73
- Variable type: Mira

Astrometry
Proper motion (μ)	RA: 14.77 mas/yr Dec.: -10.87 mas/yr
Parallax (π)	0.89±2.08 mas
Distance	480 ± 120 pc

Details
Radius	411 – 498 R_{☉}
Luminosity	12,474 L_{☉}
Temperature	2,950 K

Other designations
- S Ori, BD−04°1146, HD 36090, SAO 132163, HIP 25673

Database references
SIMBAD	data

S Orionis is an asymptotic giant branch star in the constellation Orion, approximately 480 parsecs (1,600 ly) away. It varies regularly in brightness between extremes of magnitude 7.2 and 14 every 14 months.

== Variability ==
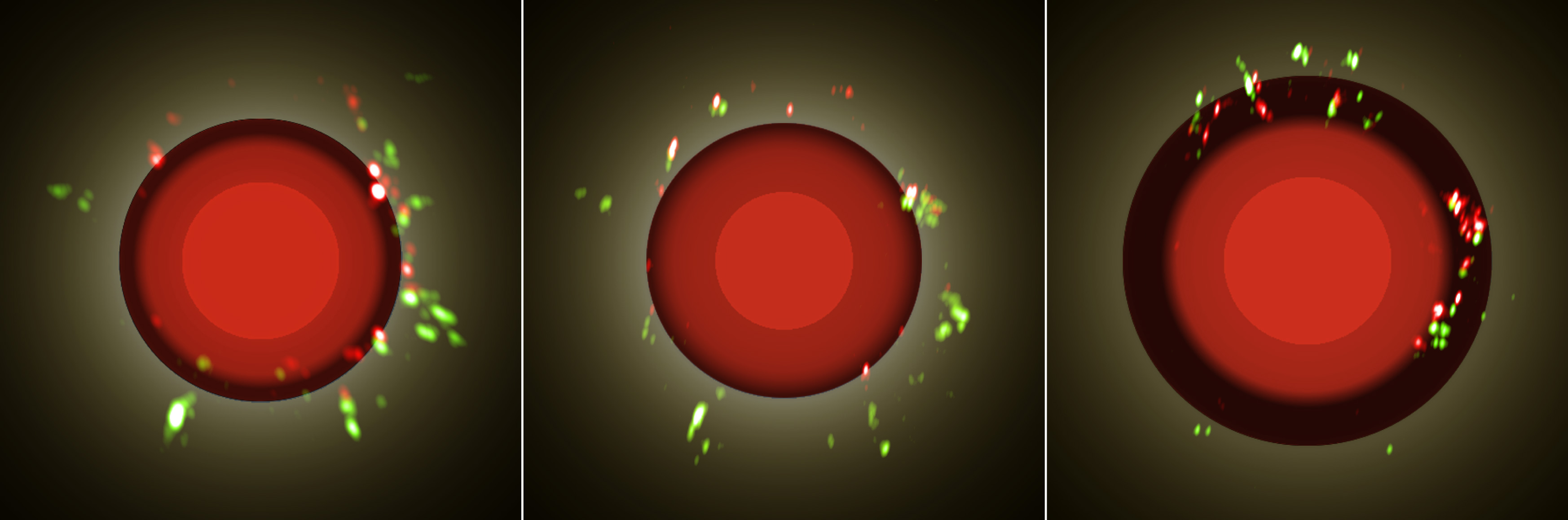
Pulsations of S Orionis, showing dust production and masers (ESO)

S Orionis is a Mira variable that pulsates with an approximately 420‑day cycle, and varies in radius from 2.0 to 2.3 astronomical units. The pulsations have been observed using VLTI and VLBA observations which measured an angular diameter varying between 7.9 and 9.7 mas.

The mean period of variation has been shown to change over time, from less than 410 days to over 440 days. The variations are approximately sinusoidal with a weak, not statistically-significant, trend towards longer period. The cycle of period changes is around 70 years within a total observation period of only about 100 years, so it is difficult to be certain about long-term behaviour. However, this behaviour is not expected to be the result of thermal pulses or evolutionary changes, and the cause is unknown.

== Companion ==
S Orionis is listed in the Washington Double Star Catalog as a double star with a tenth magnitude companion 47" away. The companion is G0 star HD 294176.

== Circumstellar environment ==
S Orionis is surrounded by masers and dust condensed from its cool stellar wind. The size of the dust shells varies as the star pulsates and changes temperature, from around 8 AU to 10 AU across. The positions of the masers have been measured very accurately using VLBI.
