= S Virginis =

Variable star in the constellation Virgo

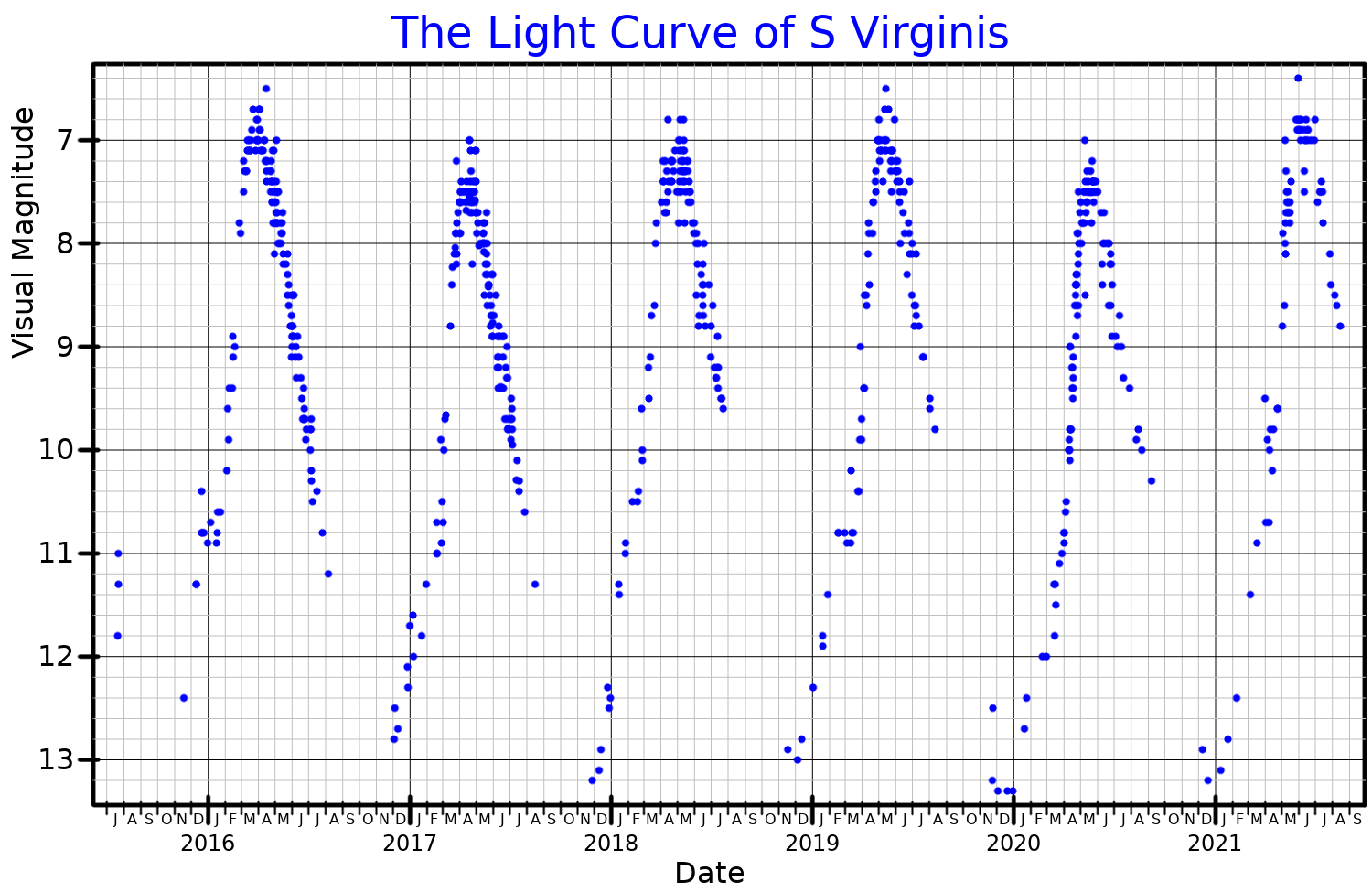
- The visual band light curve of S Virginis, from AAVSO data

Observation data Epoch J2000 Equinox ICRS
- Constellation: Virgo
- Right ascension: 13^{h} 33^{m} 00.1103^{s}
- Declination: −07° 11′ 41.039″
- Apparent magnitude (V): 6.3 - 13.2

Characteristics
- Evolutionary stage: AGB
- Spectral type: M6IIIe-M9.5e
- U−B color index: +2.1
- B−V color index: +0.74
- Variable type: Mira

Astrometry
Radial velocity (R_{v})	9.60 km/s
Proper motion (μ)	RA: −16.813±0.680 mas/yr Dec.: 3.010±0.537 mas/yr
Parallax (π)	1.3709±0.3737 mas
Distance	approx. 2,400 ly (approx. 700 pc)

Details
Mass	3.6 M_{☉}
Radius	435 R_{☉}
Luminosity	38.174 L_{☉}
Surface gravity (log g)	2.29 cgs
Temperature	3,283 K
Metallicity [Fe/H]	−0.24 dex

Other designations
- S Virginis, BD−06°3837, HIP 66100, GC 18312, HR 5101, AAVSO 1327-06, GCRV 8027, SAO 139403, HD 117833

Database references
SIMBAD	data

S Virginis is a Mira-type variable star in the constellation Virgo. Located approximately 700 parsecs (2,300 ly) distant, it varies between magnitudes 6.3 and 13.2 over a period of approximately 375 days. John Russell Hind announced the discovery this star in 1852.
