= R Capricorni =

Variable star in the constellation Capricornus

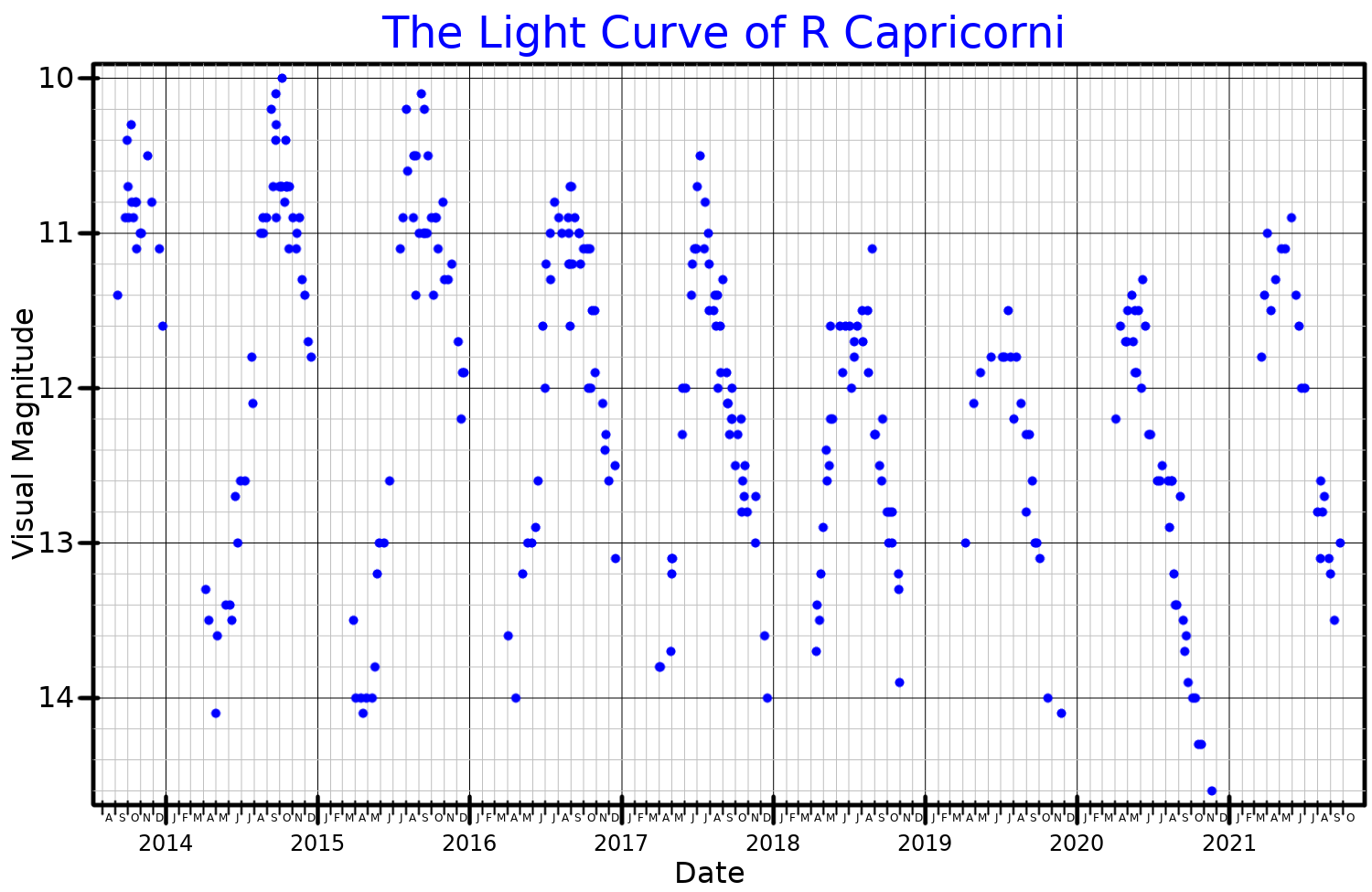
- The visual band light curve of R Capricorni, from AAVSO data

Observation data Epoch J2000.0 Equinox J2000.0 (ICRS)
- Constellation: Capricornus
- Right ascension: 20^{h} 11^{m} 18.35^{s}
- Declination: −14° 16′ 03.4″
- Apparent magnitude (V): 9.4 to 14.9

Characteristics
- Evolutionary stage: AGB
- Spectral type: Cev
- Variable type: Mira

Astrometry
Proper motion (μ)	RA: +1.571 mas/yr Dec.: +1.420 mas/yr
Parallax (π)	0.5515±0.0362 mas
Distance	5,900 ± 400 ly (1,800 ± 100 pc)

Other designations
- R Cap, BD−14 5663, GC 28001, SAO 163323, 2MASS J20111833−1416033

Database references
SIMBAD	data

R Capricorni (R Cap) is a star in the constellation of Capricornus. It has an apparent visual magnitude which varies between 9.4 and 14.9. A mira variable and ageing red giant, it is in the asymptotic giant branch stage of its lifespan. It is a carbon star.

John Russell Hind discovered this variable star in 1848. It appeared with its variable star designation, R Capricorni, in Annie Jump Cannon's 1907 work, Second Catalogue of Variable Stars.

R Capricorni is too far from earth for its parallax to be measured effectively; Guandalini and Cristallo calculated the luminosity of Mira variables based on their periods. Using a period of 345.13 days, they calculated the absolute magnitude of R Capricorni to be −4.58.

R Capricorni is losing mass at rate of 2.8×10^{−6} solar mass/year.
