= X Ophiuchi =

Binary star in the constellation Ophiuchus

- Location of X Ophiuchi (circled)

Observation data Epoch J2000.0 Equinox ICRS
- Constellation: Ophiuchus
- Right ascension: 18^{h} 38^{m} 21.132^{s}
- Declination: +08° 50′ 02.81″
- Apparent magnitude (V): 6.40 (5.9 to 9.2)

Characteristics
- Spectral type: M0-8e + K2:III; M5e–M9e
- U−B color index: 0.89
- B−V color index: 1.32
- Variable type: Mira

Astrometry
Radial velocity (R_{v})	−71.46±0.27 km/s
Proper motion (μ)	RA: 4.481 mas/yr Dec.: 14.781 mas/yr
Parallax (π)	5.1425±0.3495 mas
Distance	630 ± 40 ly (190 ± 10 pc)

Orbit
Period (P)	877.14±24.53 yr
Semi-major axis (a)	0.822±0.090″
Eccentricity (e)	0.446±0.026
Inclination (i)	103.7±1.2°
Longitude of the node (Ω)	130.1±0.3°
Periastron epoch (T)	2,020.98±23.27
Argument of periastron (ω) (secondary)	14.1±2.6°

Details

Mira variable
Mass	1.5 M_{☉}
Radius	349 R_{☉}
Luminosity	7,420 L_{☉}
Temperature	2,900 K

K-type giant
Mass	3.0 M_{☉}

Other designations
- X Oph, BD+08°3780, GC 25485, HD 172171, HIP 91389, HR 7002, SAO 123744, PPM 166252, WDS J18384+0850AB

Database references
SIMBAD	data

X Ophiuchi is a binary star system in the equatorial constellation of Ophiuchus, abbreviated X Oph. It is a Mira variable that ranges in brightness from an apparent visual magnitude of 5.9 down to 9.2 with a period of 328.85 days. The system is located at a distance of approximately 630 light years from the Sun based on parallax measurements, but is drifting closer with a radial velocity of −71 km/s.

This star was found to be variable by T. H. E. C. Espin in 1886. The binary nature of this system was reported by W. J. Hussey in 1900, listing an angular separation of 0.22″ along a position angle of 195.2°. L. Campbell used light curves of the star from 1904 to 1921 to find a variability period of 337 days. In 1922, G. Van Biesbroeck showed that only the northward member of the pair is variable. P. W. Merrill in 1923 found a stellar classification of M6e for the variable component at maximum, while the secondary is K0. At minimum, the primary becomes fainter than the secondary in visual wavelengths. This make X Ophiuchi the Mira variable with the lowest maginitude variation known.

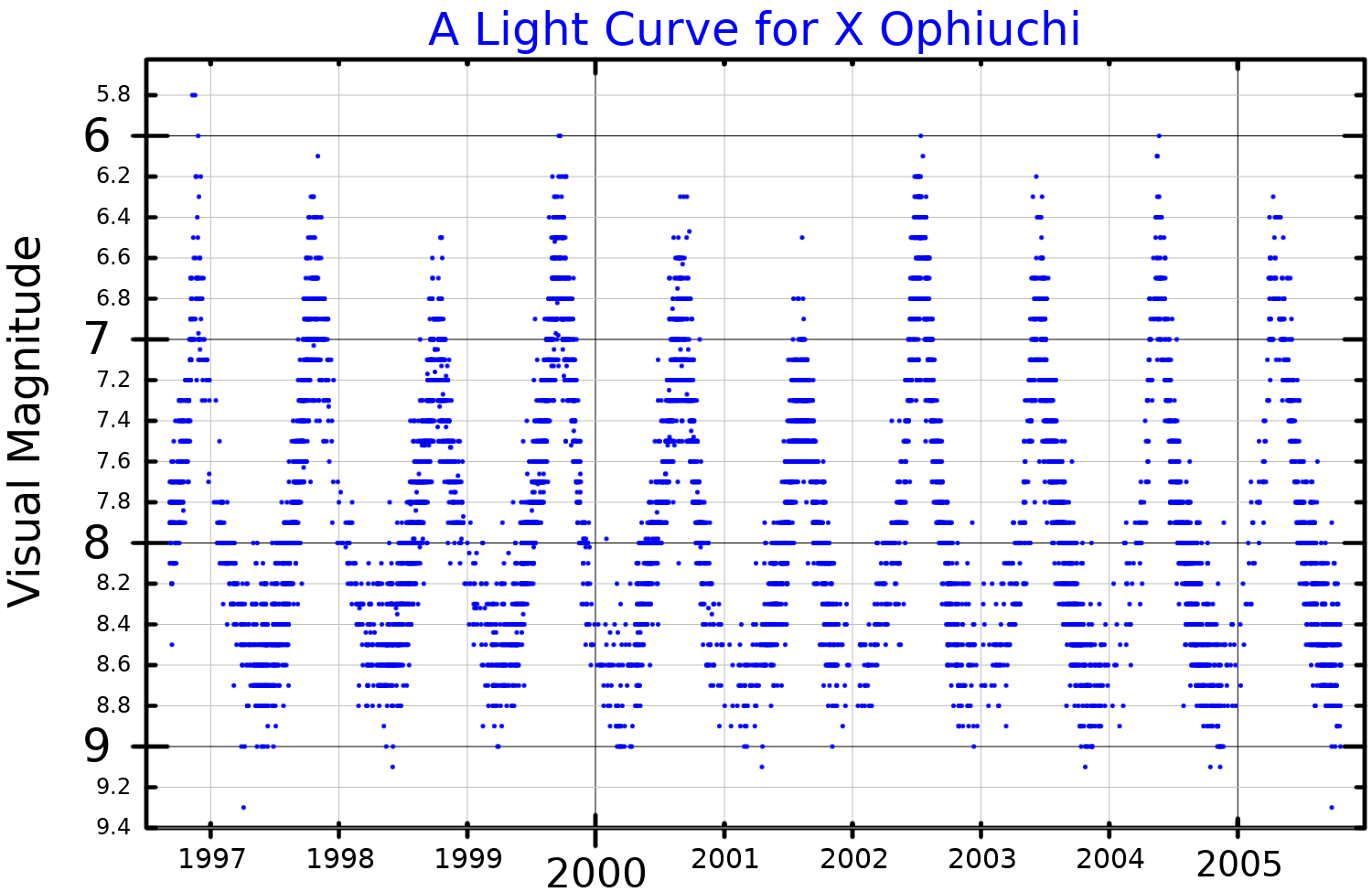
A visual band light curve for X Ophiuchi, plotted from AAVSO data

By 1959, the orbital arc of the pair had spanned an angle of 50°, providing an estimated orbital period of at least 500 years and a separation of 64 AU. Preliminary orbital models suggested a mass of 0.8 M_{☉} for the variable component and 1.2 M_{☉} for the K-type giant. According to a 2014 publication, the total mass of the system is 4.5 M_{☉}, with 2/3 of this mass (or 3 M_{☉}) belonging to the K-type giant, and the remaining 1.5 M_{☉} belonging to the Mira variable. The latter star showed an age of around five billion years. At that mass, the variable component must have undergone significant mass loss in order to have already evolved away from the main sequence. The K-type component may have received up to 0.1 M_{☉} from the donor star.

A 2007 model gives an orbital period of about 877 years with an eccentricity (ovalness) of 0.45. The variable component is an oxygen-rich M-type Mira variable. The duration, amplitude, and shape of the light curve is found to vary slightly from cycle to cycle. Some show a hump during the ascending curve. Its estimated mass loss rate is 2.95×10^{−9} M_{☉}·yr^{−1}. In 1992, a strong radio flare event was observed from this system at a frequency of 1,667 MHz. This outburst came from an OH maser in the inner part of a shell surrounding the variable. Water in the shell is being photodissociated to create OH molecules.
