= R Aquilae =

Red giant star in the constellation Aquila

Observation data Epoch J2000 Equinox ICRS
- Constellation: Aquila
- Right ascension: 19^{h} 06^{m} 22.25105^{s}
- Declination: +08° 13′ 48.0004″
- Apparent magnitude (V): 5.3 to 12.0

Characteristics
- Evolutionary stage: AGB
- Spectral type: M5-9IIIe
- U−B color index: 0.37
- B−V color index: 1.60
- Variable type: Mira

Astrometry
Radial velocity (R_{v})	34.6±0.6 km/s
Proper motion (μ)	RA: +4.404 mas/yr Dec.: −68.042 mas/yr
Parallax (π)	4.2030±0.4306 mas
Distance	763±29 ly (234±9 pc)

Details
Mass	1.0 M_{☉}
Radius	275 (Note: Calculated using angular diameter and distance in Table 1) R_{☉}
Luminosity	3,470±50 L_{☉}
Temperature	2,800 K

Other designations
- R Aql, AAVSO 1901+08, BD+08°3970, HD 177940, HIP 93820, HR 7243, SAO 124266

Database references
SIMBAD	data

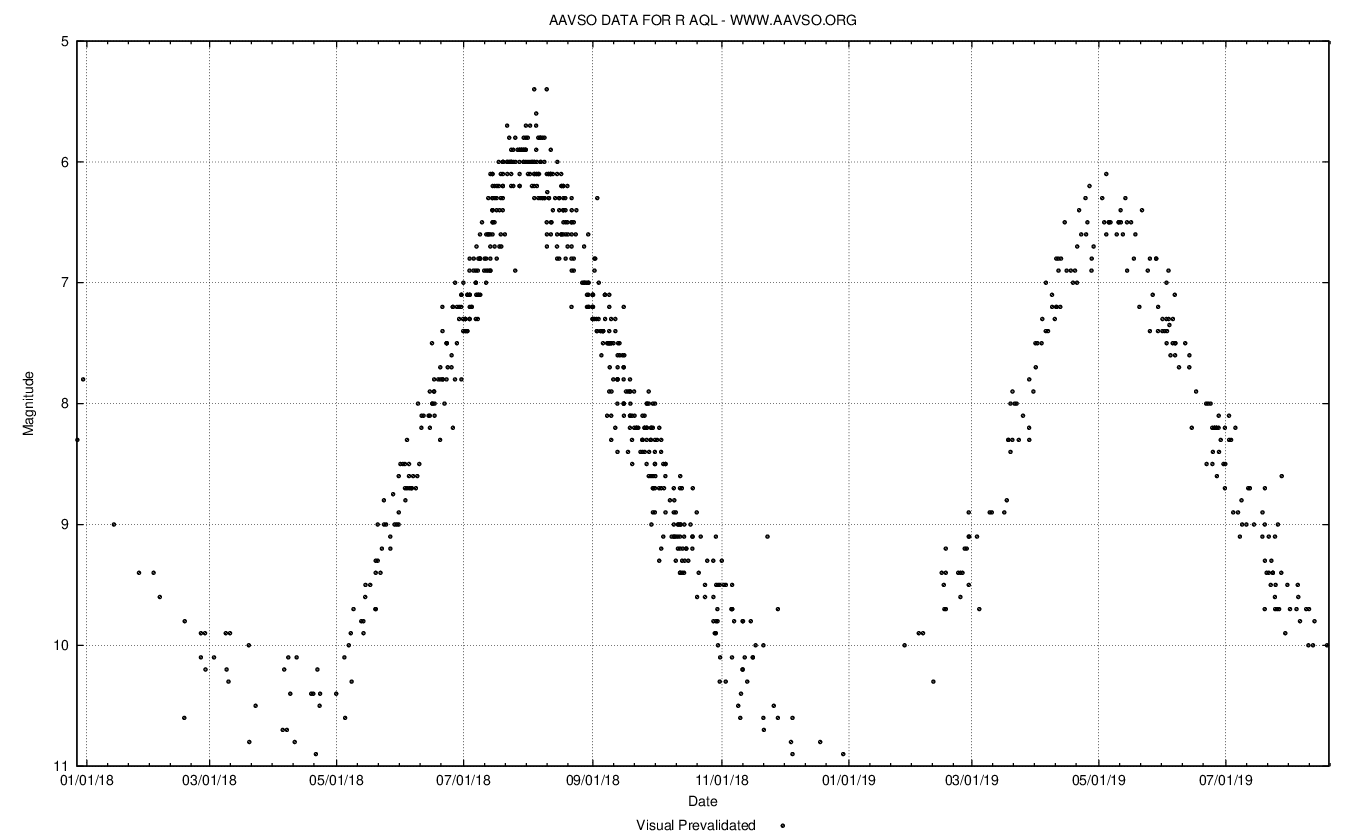
R Aquilae light curve

R Aquilae is a variable star in the equatorial constellation of Aquila. It is located approximately 760 light years distant from the Sun and is drifting further away with a radial velocity of 35 km/s. This is a thermally-pulsating Mira variable that ranges in brightness from magnitude 5.3 down to 12.0 with a period of 269.84 days. The period was over 300 days when first observed, and has declined steadily since – decreasing from 320 in 1915 down to 264 in 2010, at an average rate of 0.4 days per year. The amplitude of the variation has also decreased by about a magnitude since discovery. The peak magnitude is bright enough for the star to be visible to the naked eye as a dim, red-hued star.

The discovery of R Aquilae was announced by Friedrich Wilhelm Argelander on May 20, 1856. It had been under observation by Argelander and his colleagues at Bonn Observatory since 1854. No name was given to the star in Argelander's announcement, but by October of 1856 it was being called R Aquilae, its variable star designation, in the astronomical literature.

R Aquilae is an aging red giant on the asymptotic giant branch with a stellar classification that varies over time, between M5e and M9e, where the 'e' suffix indicates emission features in the spectrum. The cooler spectral types occur near the minimum visual magnitude, and the hottest near maximum. The star may have recently undergone a helium flash. It is oxygen-rich in abundance with the same mass as the Sun but has expanded to 275 times the Sun's radius. On average, the star is radiating 3,470 times the luminosity of the Sun from its swollen photosphere at an effective temperature of 2,800 K or so. It is losing mass at the rate of (6 – 35) × 10^{−7} M_{☉} yr^{−1}, forming a dusty silicate shell.
