= LP Andromedae =

Star in the constellation Andromeda

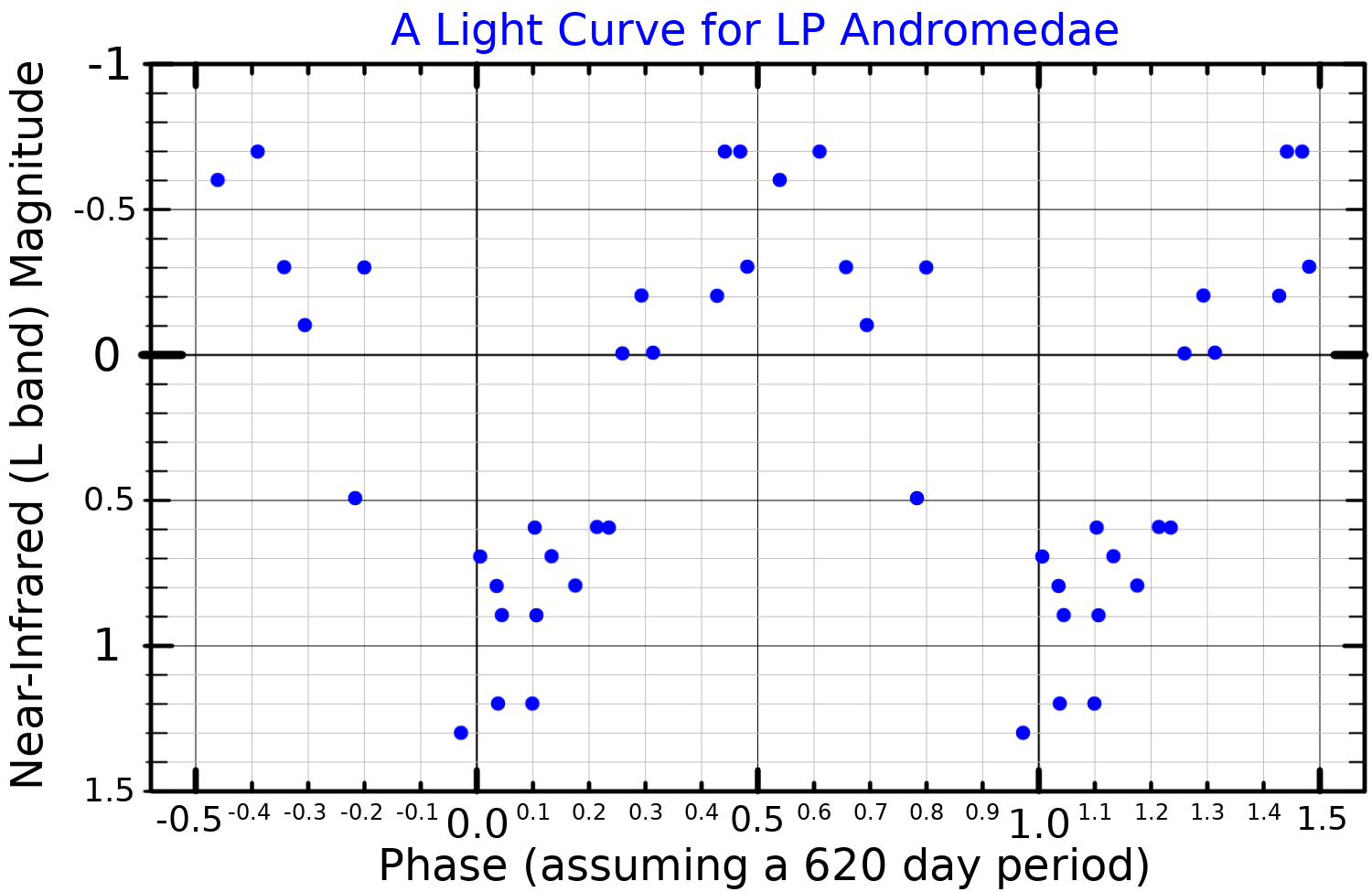
- A near-infrared (L band) light curve for LP Andromedae, adapted from Jones et al. (1990)

Observation data Epoch J2000 Equinox J2000
- Constellation: Andromeda
- Right ascension: 23^{h} 34^{m} 27.5216^{s}
- Declination: +43° 33′ 01.300″
- Apparent magnitude (V): 15.12 variable

Characteristics
- Evolutionary stage: AGB
- Spectral type: C8,3.5e
- Apparent magnitude (G): 16.9041
- Apparent magnitude (J): 9.623
- Apparent magnitude (H): 6.355
- Apparent magnitude (K): 2.71
- Variable type: Mira

Astrometry
Proper motion (μ)	RA: −21.313±0.532 mas/yr Dec.: −22.058±0.453 mas/yr
Parallax (π)	2.5002±0.3626 mas
Distance	approx. 1,300 ly (approx. 400 pc)
Absolute bolometric magnitude (M_{bol})	−5.21±0.26

Details
Mass	0.8 M_{☉}
Radius	340 – 420 R_{☉}
Luminosity	2,900 – 16,200 L_{☉}
Temperature	2,100 – 3,350 K

Other designations
- 2MASS J23342752+4333012, IRAS 23320+4316, RAFGL 3116

Database references
SIMBAD	data

LP Andromedae (often abbreviated to LP And) is a carbon star in the constellation Andromeda. It is also a Mira variable whose mean apparent visual magnitude is 15.12 and has pulsations with an amplitude of 1.50 magnitudes and a period of 614 days.

In 1974 LP Andromedae, known then as IRC+40540, was identified as a carbon star and also shown to be variable. It had previously been suspected of variability during the 2 Micron All Sky Survey (2MASS). A detailed study of its spectrum showed an unusually cool star with a basic class of C8, and Swan band strength of 3.5. It also showed strong C^{13} isotopic bands. The period was narrowed down to around 614 days, one of the longest periods known for a Mira variable.

This star has a dusty envelope with an estimated mass of 3.2 M_{☉}, fueled by the star itself which is losing mass at a rate 10^{−5} M_{☉}/yr. Such a high mass loss rate should place LP Andromedae close to the end of its asymptotic giant branch evolution. The envelope extends to a distance of 3 parsec from the star, and is mainly made of silicon carbide and carbon particles.

== See also ==
- List of largest known stars
