= S Carinae =

Star in the constellation Carina

- Location of S Carinae (circled in red)

Observation data Epoch J2000.0 Equinox ICRS
- Constellation: Carina
- Right ascension: 10^{h} 09^{m} 21.894^{s}
- Declination: −61° 32′ 56.43″
- Apparent magnitude (V): 4.5 - 10.0

Characteristics
- Evolutionary stage: AGB
- Spectral type: K5e - M6e
- U−B color index: +0.93 to +1.93
- B−V color index: +1.43 to +2.60
- Variable type: Mira

Astrometry
| Radial velocity (R_{v}) | 289.30 km/s |
| Proper motion (μ) | RA: −94.237 mas/yr Dec.: 76.811 mas/yr |
| Parallax (π) | 2.0110±0.0855 mas |
| Distance | 1,620 ± 70 ly (500 ± 20 pc) |
| Absolute magnitude (M_{V}) | −0.71 to −3.41 |

Details
| Mass | 0.6 M_{☉} |
| Radius | 120 R_{☉} |
| Luminosity | 2,200 L_{☉} |
| Surface gravity (log g) | −0.9 - 1.0 cgs |
| Temperature | 3,050 - 3,590 K |

Other designations
- HR 3999, HD 88366, CP−60°1701, HIP 49751, SAO 250840, GC 13971

Database references
| SIMBAD | data |

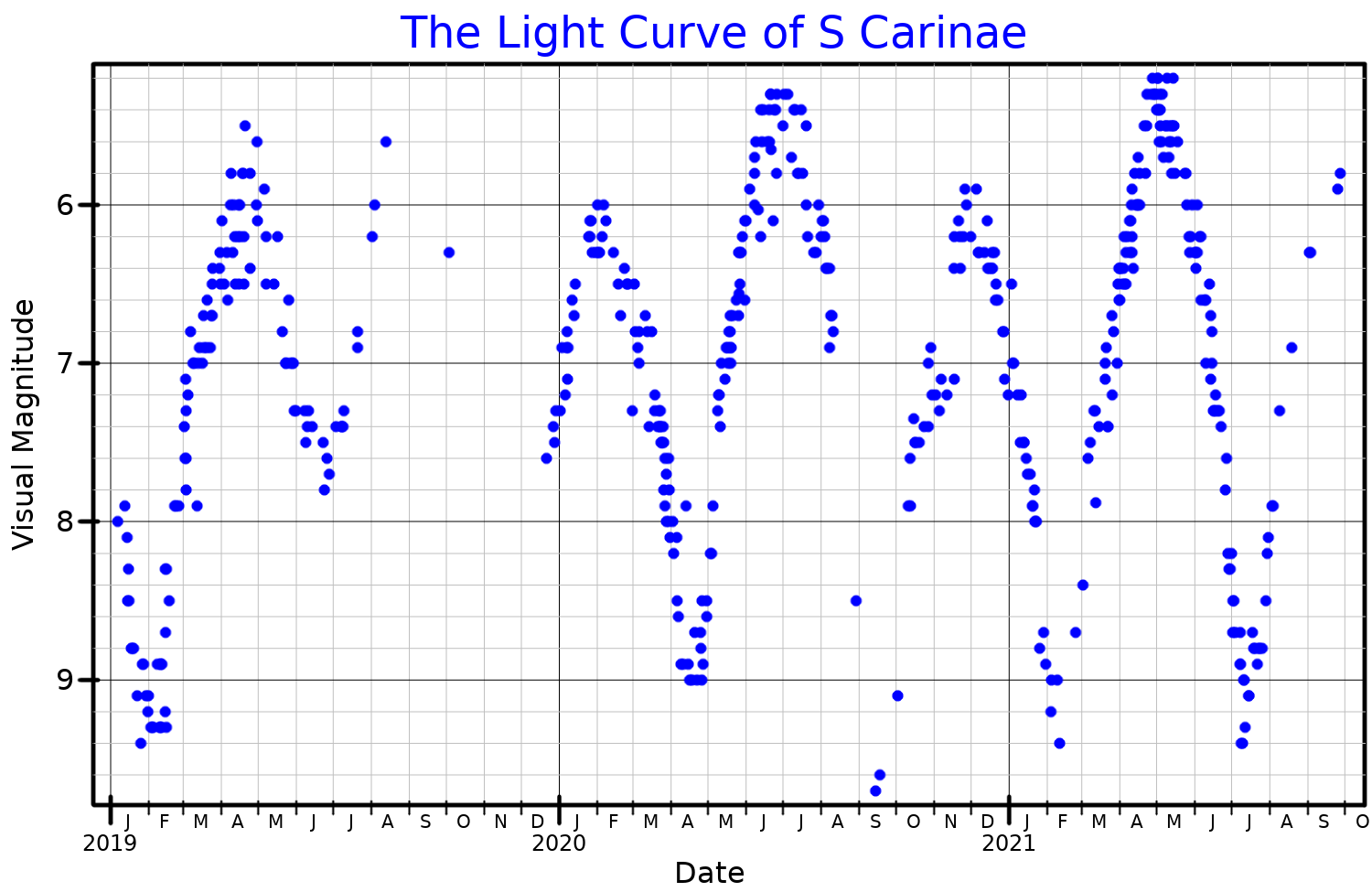
Visual band light curve of S Carinae, from AAVSO data

S Carinae (HD 88366) is a variable star in the constellation Carina, approximately 1,620 light years from Earth.

S Carinae is an M-type red giant. Benjamin Apthorp Gould discovered the variable star, in 1871. It appeared with its variable star designation, S Carinae, in Annie Jump Cannon's 1907 work, Second Catalogue of Variable Stars. It is classified as a Mira type variable star and its brightness varies between magnitude +4.5 and +10.0 with a period of 149.49 days. When it is near its maximum brightness, it is visible to the naked eye. It has one of the earliest spectral types, and hence the hottest temperatures, of any Mira variable, and has a relatively short period for the class. The temperature of this pulsing star is highest at visual brightness maximum and lowest at visual brightness minimum.

S Carinae has exhausted its core hydrogen and expanded to become a red giant. It has also exhausted its core helium and evolved to the asymptotic giant branch, where it fuses hydrogen and helium in separate shells outside the core.
