= W Hydrae =

Variable star in the constellation Hydra

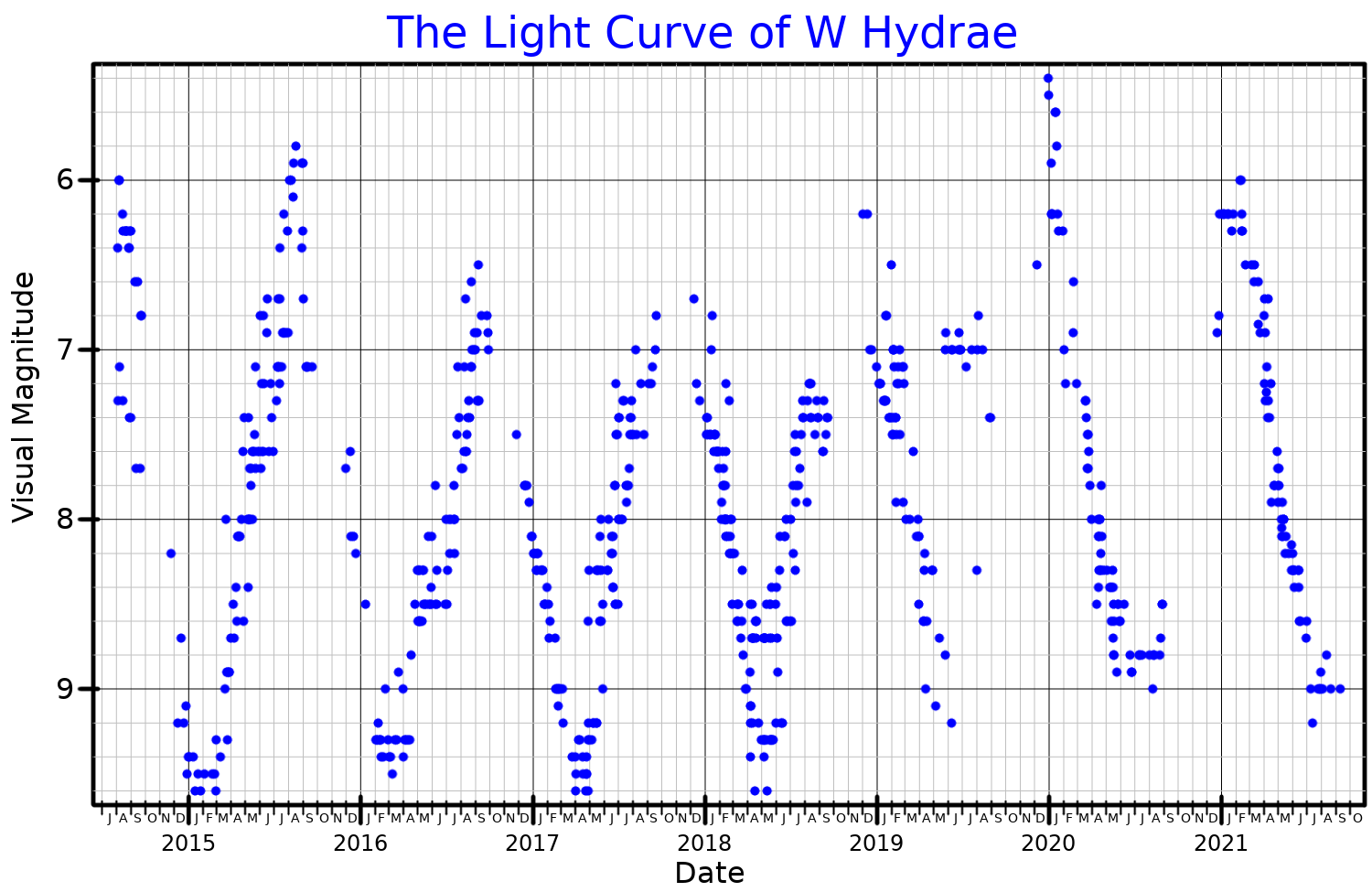
- The visual band light curve of W Hydrae, from AAVSO data

Observation data Epoch J2000.0 Equinox ICRS
- Constellation: Hydra
- Right ascension: 13^{h} 49^{m} 01.998^{s}
- Declination: −28° 22′ 03.49″
- Apparent magnitude (V): 7.7 - 11.6

Characteristics
- Spectral type: M7.5e-M9ep
- Apparent magnitude (J): −1.7
- Variable type: Mira

Astrometry
Parallax (π)	10.18±2.36 mas
Distance	320+98 −59 ly (98+30 −18 pc)

Details
Mass	2.14+1.07 −0.71 M_{☉}
Radius	436^{+134}_{−80} (Note: Radius calculated using a distance of 98+30 −18 parsecs and an angular diameter of 41.4 milliarcseconds (0.041 arcsec). 98 • 0.041 = diameter of 4.06 AU, which is multiplied by 107.5 to convert from AU to R_{☉}.) R_{☉}
Luminosity	9,290+2,460 −1,940 L_{☉}
Temperature	3,000 K

Other designations
- W Hya, CCDM J13491−2822A, HD 120285, RAFGL 1650, CPD−27°4792, HIP 67419, SAO 181981, AAVSO 1343-27, IRAS 13462-2807, GC 18659, TYC 6728-19-1.

Database references
SIMBAD	data

W Hydrae is a Mira-type variable star in the constellation Hydra. The star is nearly located within the Solar neighborhood, at 320 light years from the Solar System. It has a visual apparent magnitude range of 5.6 to 10. In the near-infrared J band it has a magnitude of -1.7, is the 7th brightest star in the night sky, and is even brighter than Sirius.

== Water masers and dust ==
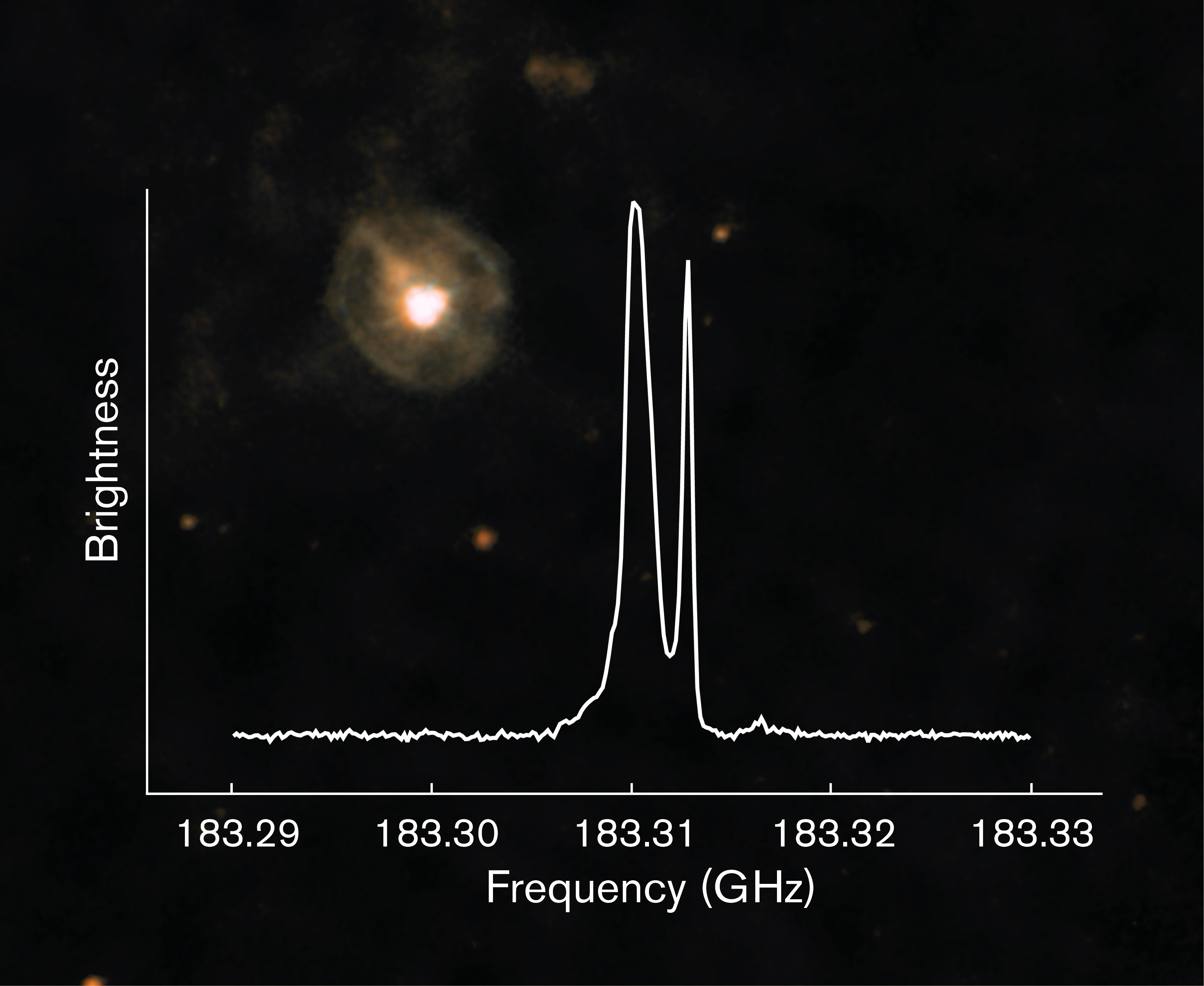
Spectrum of water vapour towards W Hydrae obtained with APEX

The star also shows signs of intense water emissions, indicative of the presence of a wide disk of dust and water vapour. Such emissions cover a zone spanning between 10.7 Astronomical Units (within Saturn's orbital zone) and 1.2 parsecs (or nearly 247,500 Astronomical Units, as far away as the Oort Cloud in Solar System).
