= T Draconis =

Carbon-rich Mira variable star in Draco

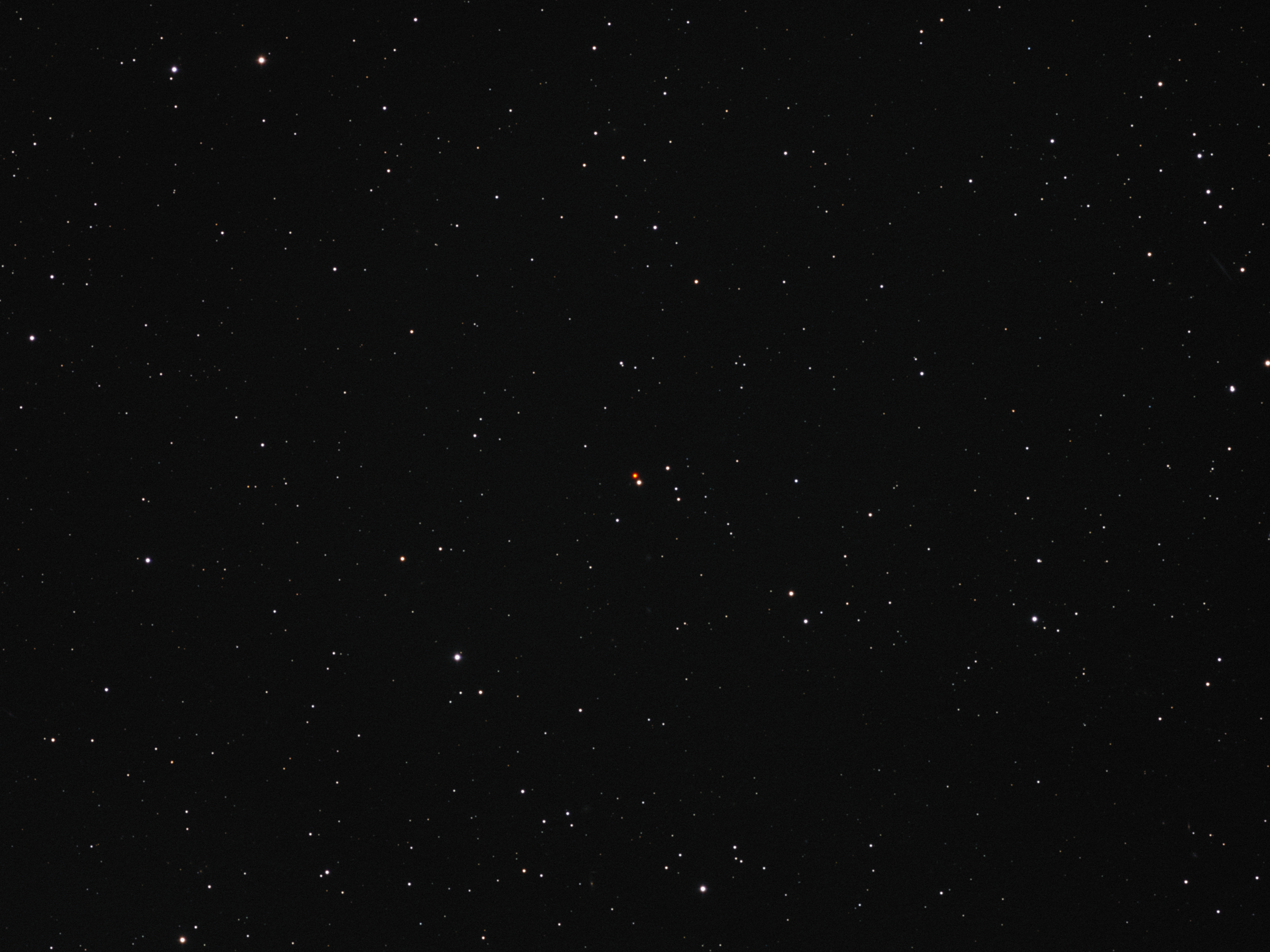
- T Draconis in optical light

Observation data Epoch J2000 Equinox ICRS
- Constellation: Draco
- Right ascension: 17^{h} 56^{m} 23.32885^{s}
- Declination: +58° 13′ 06.7834″
- Apparent magnitude (V): 7.2–13.5

Characteristics
- Spectral type: C6,2e-C8,3e(N0e)
- B−V color index: 2.70
- Variable type: Mira

Astrometry
Radial velocity (R_{v})	−23±2 km/s
Proper motion (μ)	RA: −2.849 mas/yr Dec.: +22.260 mas/yr
Parallax (π)	1.0214±0.0786 mas
Distance	3,200 ± 200 ly (980 ± 80 pc)

Details
Radius	670 R_{☉}
Luminosity	6,900 (min); 13,300 (max) L_{☉}
Temperature	2,400 K

Other designations
- T Dra, BD+58 1772a, HIP 87820, WDS J17566+5813A, GCRV 10400

Database references
SIMBAD	data

T Draconis (abbreviated T Dra) is a carbon-rich Mira variable star located in the constellation Draco.

The star's carbon-rich atmosphere produces a spectrum dominated by carbon-bearing molecular features. Its red appearance is caused by its cool, carbon rich atmosphere.

== Location and identification ==
T Draconis is located in the northern circumpolar constellation of Draco, positioned at the celestial coordinates of right ascension 17^{h} 56^{m} 23.3^{s} and declination +58° 13′ 06.8″ (J2000 epoch). Based on parallax measurements from the Gaia space observatory, the star is situated approximately 3,200 light-years (980 parsecs) away from Earth.

As a long-period Mira variable, the star's apparent magnitude fluctuates dramatically over a period of roughly 422 days. At its peak brightness (maximum magnitude ~7.2), it can be resolved using standard binoculars under dark skies. At its faintest (minimum magnitude ~13.5), it dims significantly, requiring a moderate-to-large aperture amateur telescope to detect.

T Draconis is readily identified through visual astronomy by its intense, ruby-red or charred-orange coloration. This extreme index is a hallmark of highly evolved carbon stars, whose outer atmospheres are rich in carbon molecules (such as C_{2} and CN) that heavily absorb short-wavelength blue light. In the eyepiece, it forms a prominent visual double with UY Draconis—an 11th-magnitude white-yellow star.
