= R Centauri =

Variable star in the constellation Centaurus

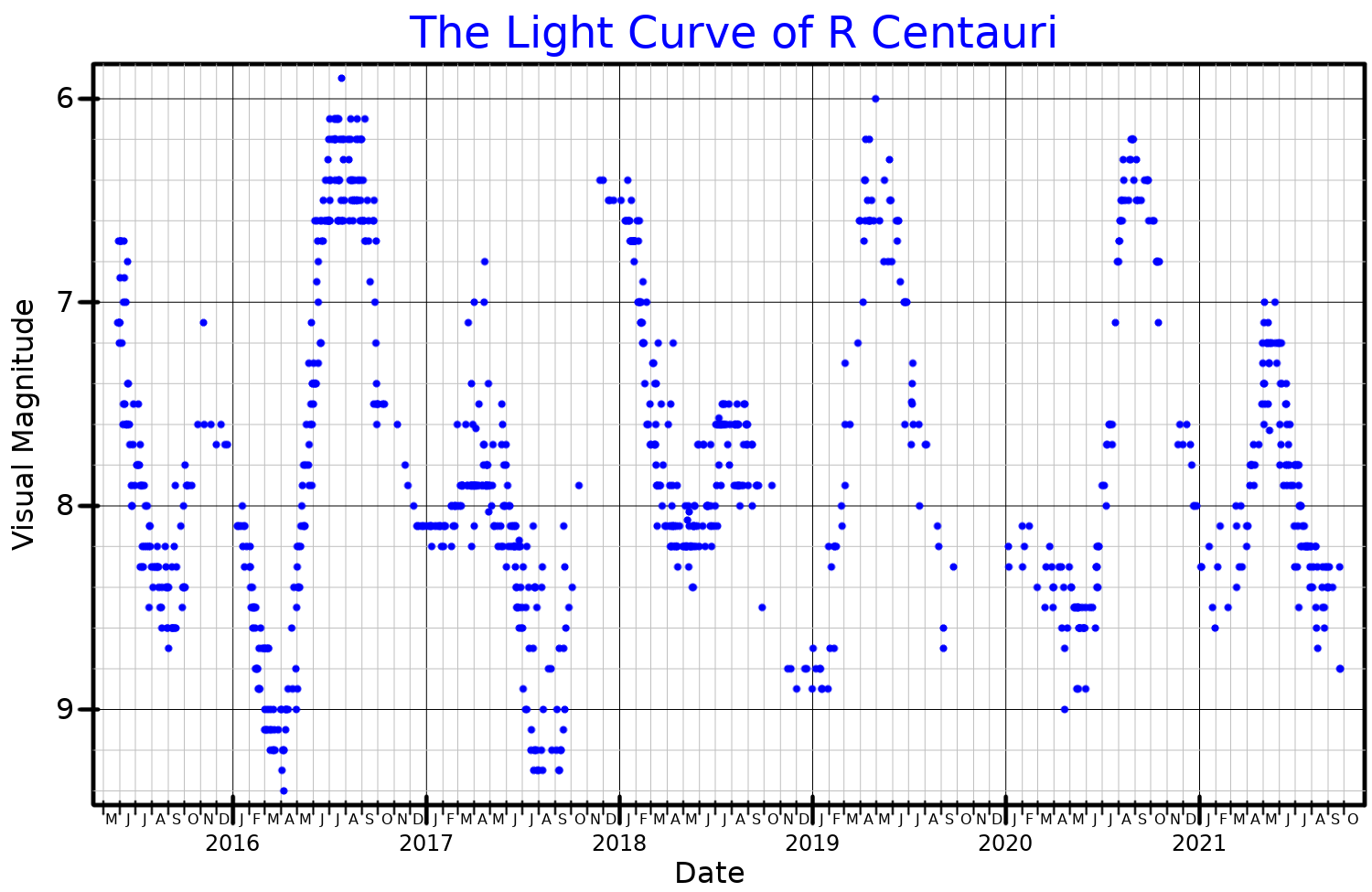
- The visual band light curve of R Centauri, from AAVSO data

Observation data Epoch J2000.0 Equinox ICRS
- Constellation: Centaurus
- Right ascension: 14^{h} 16^{m} 34.319^{s}
- Declination: −59° 54′ 49.29″
- Apparent magnitude (V): 5.2 - 11.5

Characteristics
- Evolutionary stage: AGB
- Spectral type: M5IIe (M4e-M9.5)
- U−B color index: +1.24
- B−V color index: +2.04
- Variable type: Mira

Astrometry
Radial velocity (R_{v})	−19.8 km/s
Proper motion (μ)	RA: −9.077 mas/yr Dec.: −6.692 mas/yr
Parallax (π)	1.1082±0.2413 mas
Distance	approx. 2,900 ly (approx. 900 pc)
Absolute magnitude (M_{V})	−1.49 (at maximum)

Details
Radius	615 R_{☉}
Luminosity	47,000 L_{☉}
Surface gravity (log g)	−0.733 cgs
Temperature	3,450 K

Other designations
- R Centauri, HR 5326, HD 124601, CP−59°5476, HIP 69754, SAO 241580, GC 19234, CCDM J14166-5955

Database references
SIMBAD	data

R Centauri (R Cen) is a Mira variable star in the constellation Centaurus. When it is near its maximum brightness, it is faintly visible to the naked eye under very good observing conditions.

The distance to R Centauri as indicated by its Gaia Data Release 3 parallax is about 2,900 light years, but that is considered to be potentially unreliable. The Gaia Data Release 2 parallax was negative and relatively meaningless. The older Hipparcos parallax suggested a distance of about 1,300 light years, but with a wide margin of error. Estimates based on an assumed brightness for the star, adjusted for extinction, give distances as low as 750 light years.

The effective temperature of R Centauri's photosphere has been calculated by different methods to be 2,403 K or 3,450 K. Its luminosity is even more uncertain, depending on assumptions about the distance. At a distance of 384 pc, the bolometric luminosity would be 11,342 L_{☉}, while assuming a larger distance of 640 pc the luminosity would be over 47,000 L_{☉}. In either case, it is a very large star, over 600 R_{☉}.

Benjamin Apthorp Gould discovered R Centauri, in 1871. The star is a Mira variable and its brightness varies from magnitude +5.2 to +11.5 with a period of about 500 days. It used to have an unusual double-peaked light curve, but by 2001 this had reverted to an almost normal single-peaked curve. Prior to 1950 the period was about 550 days, but since then has decreased to about 500 days. A 2016 analysis of ASAS data derived a period of 498.84 days.

It is thought that the unusual behaviour of R Centauri is caused by a flash in the helium shell around its core, which occurs periodically in asymptotic giant branch (AGB) stars as the mass of the helium shell increases with helium from the outer hydrogen shell. It is also an H_{2}O maser source.
