= TX Camelopardalis =

Star in the constellation Camelopardalis

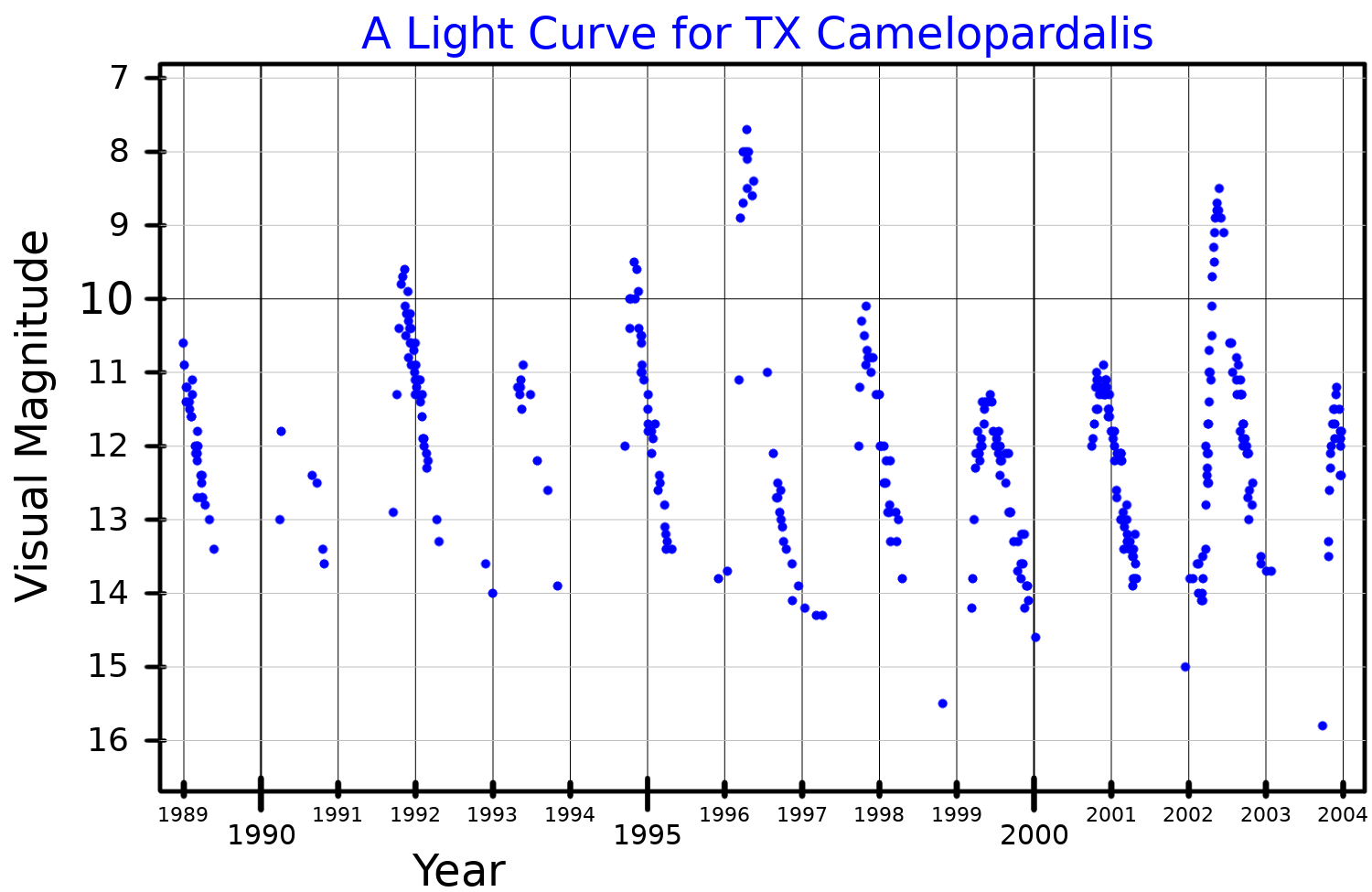
- The visual band light curve for TX Camelopardalis, from AAVSO data

Observation data Epoch J2000.0 Equinox ICRS
- Constellation: Camelopardalis
- Right ascension: 05^{h} 00^{m} 51.157^{s}
- Declination: +56° 10′ 54.09″
- Apparent magnitude (V): 7.8 - 16.9

Characteristics
- Spectral type: M8/L0III
- Variable type: Mira

Astrometry
Proper motion (μ)	RA: 11.448 mas/yr Dec.: −21.294 mas/yr
Parallax (π)	2.9991±0.3335 mas
Distance	approx. 1,100 ly (approx. 330 pc)

Details
Radius	460, 305-727 R_{☉}
Luminosity	9,638-11,360 L_{☉}
Temperature	2,300-2,779 K

Other designations
- TX Cam, Hetzler II 1, IRAS 04566+5606, IRC +60150, RAFGL 664

Database references
SIMBAD	data

TX Camelopardalis (abbreviated TX Cam) is a Mira-type variable star in the constellation Camelopardalis. It is a classical long period variable star with pulsational period of 558.7 days. Water masers have been observed around the star.
