= R Carinae =

Variable star in the constellation Carina

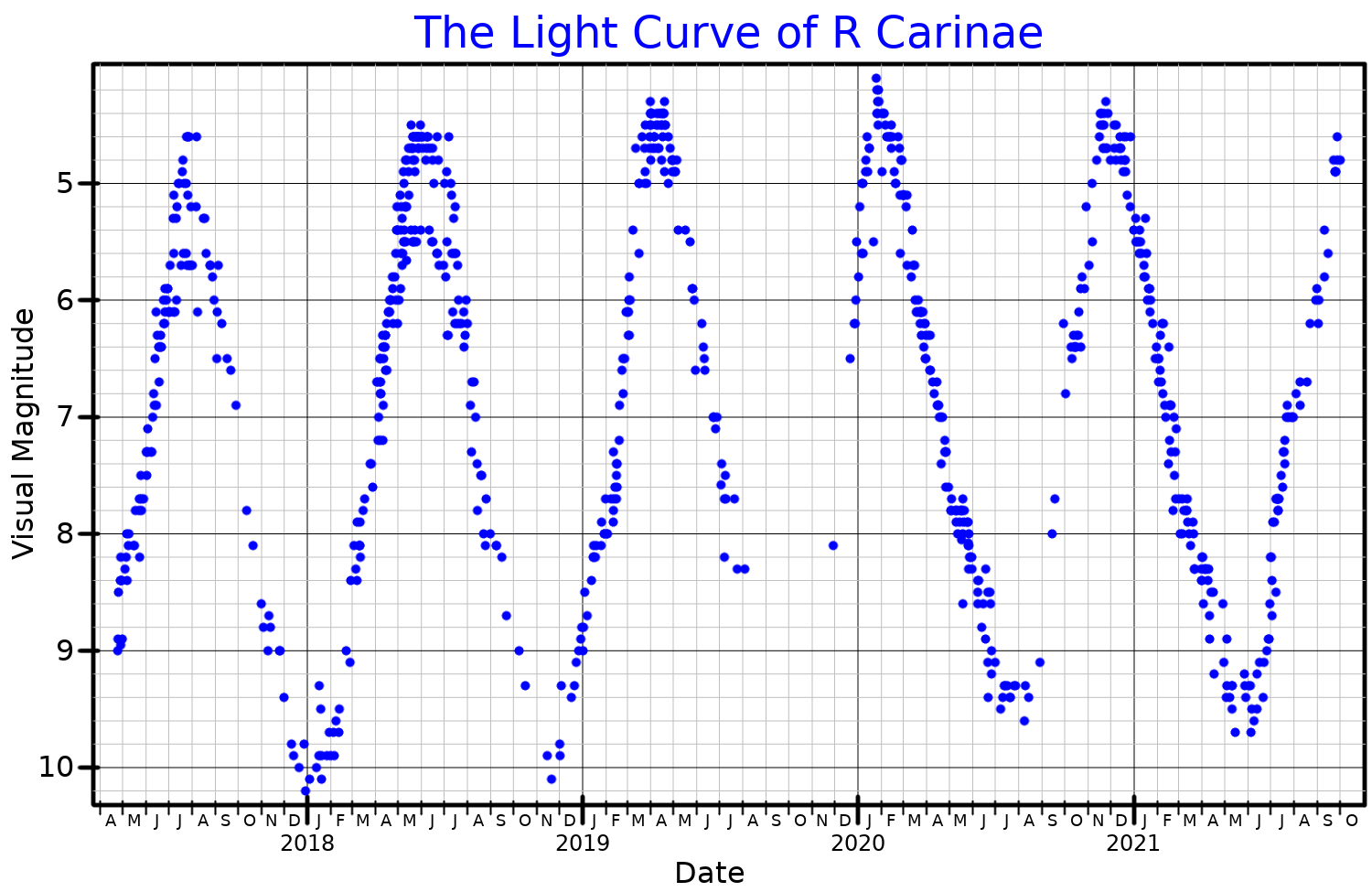
- The visual band light curve of R Carinae, from AAVSO data

Observation data Epoch J2000.0 Equinox ICRS
- Constellation: Carina
- Right ascension: 09^{h} 32^{m} 14.59610^{s}
- Declination: −62° 47′ 20.0026″
- Apparent magnitude (V): 3.9 - 10.5

Characteristics
- Evolutionary stage: AGB
- Spectral type: M6/7pe
- B−V color index: 0.906±0.009
- Variable type: Mira

Astrometry
Radial velocity (R_{v})	+28.1±1.0 km/s
Proper motion (μ)	RA: −36.291 mas/yr Dec.: +19.535 mas/yr
Parallax (π)	5.5018±0.3345 mas
Distance	590 ± 40 ly (180 ± 10 pc)
Absolute magnitude (M_{V})	1.48 (at m_{v} = 7.43)

Details
Mass	0.87+0.47 −0.31 M_{☉}
Radius	280±25 R_{☉}
Luminosity	4,571+1,331 −1,031 L_{☉}
Temperature	2,800 K

Other designations
- R Car, AAVSO 0929-62, CD−62°396, GC 13192, HD 82901, HIP 46806, HR 3816, SAO 250614, CCDM J09322-6247, WDS J09322-6247AB

Database references
SIMBAD	data

R Carinae is a double star in the southern constellation of Carina. The brighter component is a variable star that can be viewed with the naked eye at peak brightness, but is usually too faint to be seen without a telescope, having an apparent visual magnitude that fluctuates around 7.43. This star is located at a distance of approximately 600 light years from the Sun based on parallax, and is drifting further away with a radial velocity of +28 km/s.

Benjamin Apthorp Gould discovered the variable star, in 1871. It appeared with its variable star designation in Annie Jump Cannon's 1907 work, Second Catalogue of Variable Stars. The main component is an aging red giant star on the asymptotic giant branch with a stellar classification of M6/7pe. It is classified as a pulsating Mira type variable star and its visual brightness varies with an average amplitude of 4.25 magnitudes over a period of 303.99±1.08 d. Its average maximum visual magnitude is 5.05±0.45, but the brightest observed maximum was magnitude 3.9. The pulsations make its size change, in 2014, it was 400 times larger than the Sun, while in 2020 it was 540 times larger. This star is surrounded by a dusty shell, with properties that are consistent with iron-poor silicates or corundum, extending from around three stellar radii outward.

The companion is a magnitude 11.30 star at an angular separation of 2.10″ along a position angle of 132° from the main star, as of 2015.
