= S Cassiopeiae =

Star in the constellation Cassiopeia

- Location of S Cas
- S Cassiopeiae in 2MASS; Credit: SIMBAD Astronomical Database

Observation data Epoch J2000 Equinox ICRS
- Constellation: Cassiopeia
- Right ascension: 01^{h} 19^{m} 41.980^{s}
- Declination: +72° 36′ 40.85″
- Apparent magnitude (V): +7.9 – +16.1

Characteristics
- Evolutionary stage: AGB
- Spectral type: S3,4 – S5,8
- Variable type: Mira

Astrometry
Proper motion (μ)	RA: 1.980 mas/yr Dec.: 1.515 mas/yr
Parallax (π)	1.0515±0.0907 mas
Distance	3,100 ± 300 ly (950 ± 80 pc)

Details
Mass	4.1 M_{☉}
Radius	930 R_{☉}
Luminosity	5,210 L_{☉}
Surface gravity (log g)	1.32 cgs
Temperature	1,800 K
Metallicity [Fe/H]	−0.51 dex

Other designations
- S Cas, HD 7769, BD+71°66, 2MASS J01194198+7236407, GSC 04305-01322, IRAS 01159+7220, IRC+70024, AAVSO 0112+72

Database references
SIMBAD	data

S Cassiopeiae (S Cas, HD 7769) is a Mira variable and S-type star in the constellation Cassiopeia. It is an unusually cool star, rapidly losing mass and surrounded by dense gas and dust producing astrophysical masers.

== Distance ==
In the absence of a measurement of its parallax by the Hipparcos satellite, its distance from the Solar System was estimated between 1,860 and 2,770 light-years. Gaia Data Release 3 published a parallax of 1.0515±0.0907 mas, indicating a distance around 950 pc, but the observations have a very high noise level and are considered unreliable. An independent calculation from a period–luminosity relation gives a distance of 880 pc.

== Spectral type ==
With a spectral type of S3,4e-S5,8e, S Cassiopeiae is an S-type star similar to χ Cygni; these are asymptotic giant branch (AGB) stars similar to those of class M except that the dominant spectral bands of metal oxides are formed by metals of the fifth period of the periodic table as zirconium or yttrium. Another feature of this class of stars is the high mass loss; in the case of S Cassiopeiae it is estimated at 1.8×10^{−6} M_{☉} per year.

== Characteristics ==
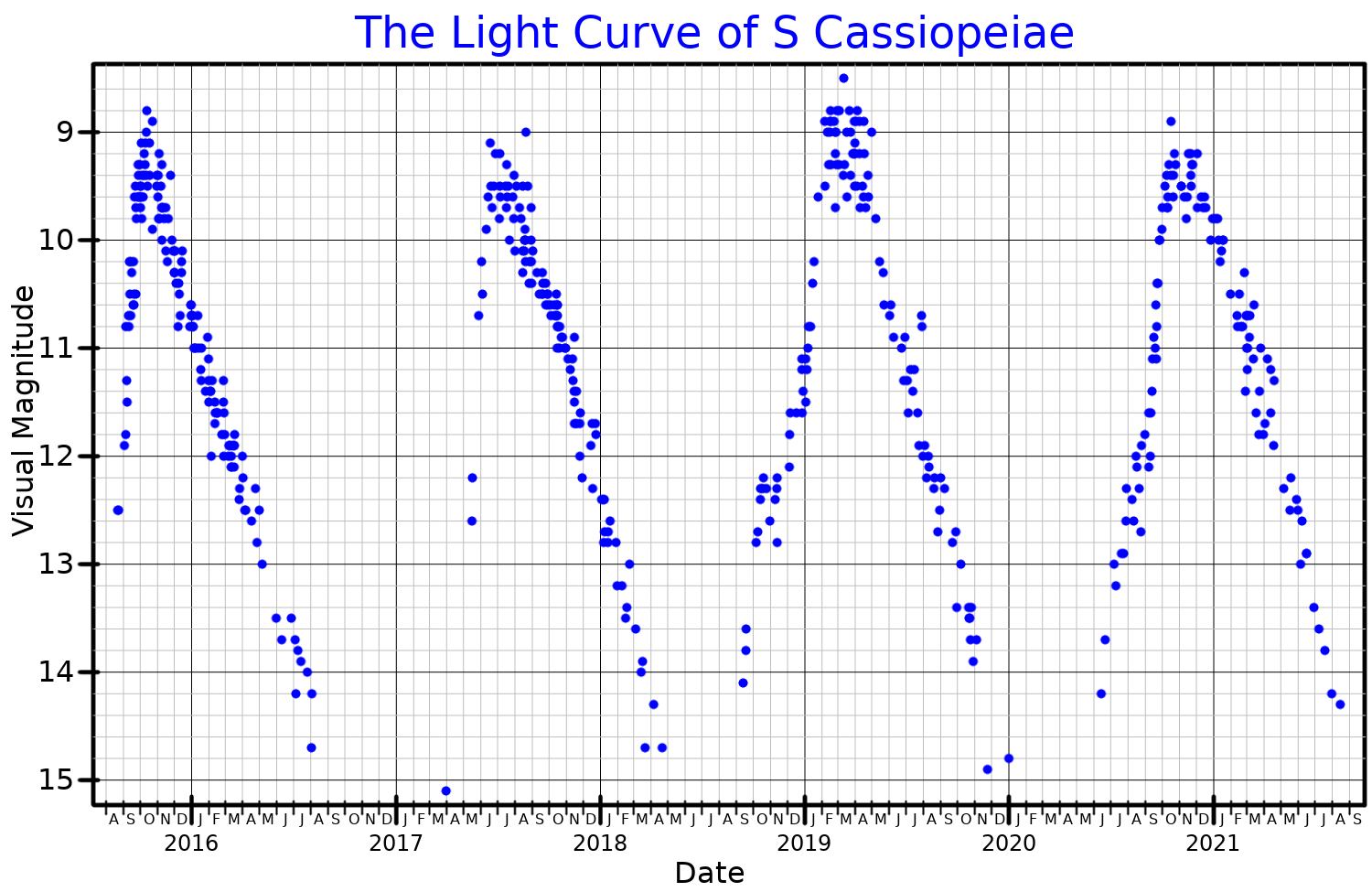
The visual band light curve of S Cassiopeiae, from AAVSO data

S Cassiopeiae has a radius of 934 solar radii; if placed at the center of the Solar System, it would extend past the orbit of Mars and the Asteroid Belt. Its effective temperature is 1,800 K, which is possibly a late thermal pulse asymptotic giant branch red giant star near the tip of its evolution, after this, it may enter its white dwarf phase after it sheds its outer layers or shrinks and gets hotter to a possibly orange giant. Its surface temperature is exceptionally cool for any star other than the brown dwarfs, and its bolometric luminosity is 5,210 times that of the sun.

S Cassiopeiae is a variable Mira, a pulsating variable star whose visual brightness varies over several magnitudes with a somewhat regular period and amplitude. Its visual magnitude varies between +7.9 and +16.1 over an average period of 612.43 days. Mira variables are stars in the last stages of evolution whose instability comes from pulsations in their surfaces, causing changes in color and brightness. Some of them, including S Cassiopeiae show SiO maser emission.

== See also ==
- TZ Cassiopeiae
- PZ Cassiopeiae
- List of largest stars
- T Cephei
