= R Ursae Majoris =

Variable star in the constellation Ursa Major

Observation data Epoch J2000 Equinox J2000
- Constellation: Ursa Major
- Right ascension: 10^{h} 44^{m} 38.472^{s}
- Declination: +68° 46′ 32.68″
- Apparent magnitude (V): 6.5 – 13.7

Characteristics
- Evolutionary stage: AGB
- Spectral type: M3e-M9e
- Variable type: Mira variable

Astrometry
Radial velocity (R_{v})	+40.49 km/s
Proper motion (μ)	RA: −40.665 mas/yr Dec.: −24.566 mas/yr
Parallax (π)	1.97±0.05 mas
Distance	1,657 ± 42 ly (508±13 pc)

Details
Mass	2.8 M_{☉}
Radius	230 (Note: Calculated, using the Stefan-Boltzmann law and the star's effective temperature and luminosity, with respect to the solar nominal effective temperature of 5,772 K: $$\sqrt{\biggl(\frac{5,772}{3,200}\biggr)^4 \cdot 5,000} = 230\ R_\odot.$$) R_{☉}
Luminosity	5,000±900 L_{☉}
Surface gravity (log g)	1.75 cgs
Temperature	3,200+100 −400 K
Metallicity [Fe/H]	−0.54 dex

Other designations
- BD+69°587, HD 92763, HIP 52546, TYC 4385-1427-1, IRAS 10411+6902

Database references
SIMBAD	data

R Ursae Majoris is a Mira variable star in the constellation Ursa Major. Parallax measurements give a distance of 1,660 light-years (508 parsecs) light-years.

== Characteristics ==
R Ursae Majoris is a Mira variable with a pulsation period of 301.45 days. The star's apparent magnitude varies from +6.5 and +13.7, which is too faint to be visible to the naked eye, and its spectral type varies from M3e to M9e, with the 'e' indicating emission lines in the spectrum. It was discovered to be a variable star in 1853 by Norman Pogson.

This is an evolved star, currently in the asymptotic giant branch stage of evolution. It is roughly 5,000 times as luminous as the Sun, having a size 230 times that of the Sun and a cool effective temperature of 3,200 K, giving it a red hue typical of M-type stars. The high luminosity and pulsations induce stellar mass loss, forming a circumstellar envelope made up of gas and dust. The dust shell is modelled to have an inner radius of 3,700 solar radii (17 astronomical units) and an outer radius of 37,000 R_{☉} (170 au). At the inner edge of the shell, the dust's temperature is of 760 K.

R Ursae Majoris may have a companion. It displays an excess of ultraviolet radiation, which might be coming from a hotter star. This star is estimated to have an effective temperature of 9,200+1,100
−300 K and a luminosity 0.85+0.40
−0.20 times solar (L_{☉}), although the luminosity seems far too low for a main sequence star of the expected temperature.
