= S Boötis =

Variable star

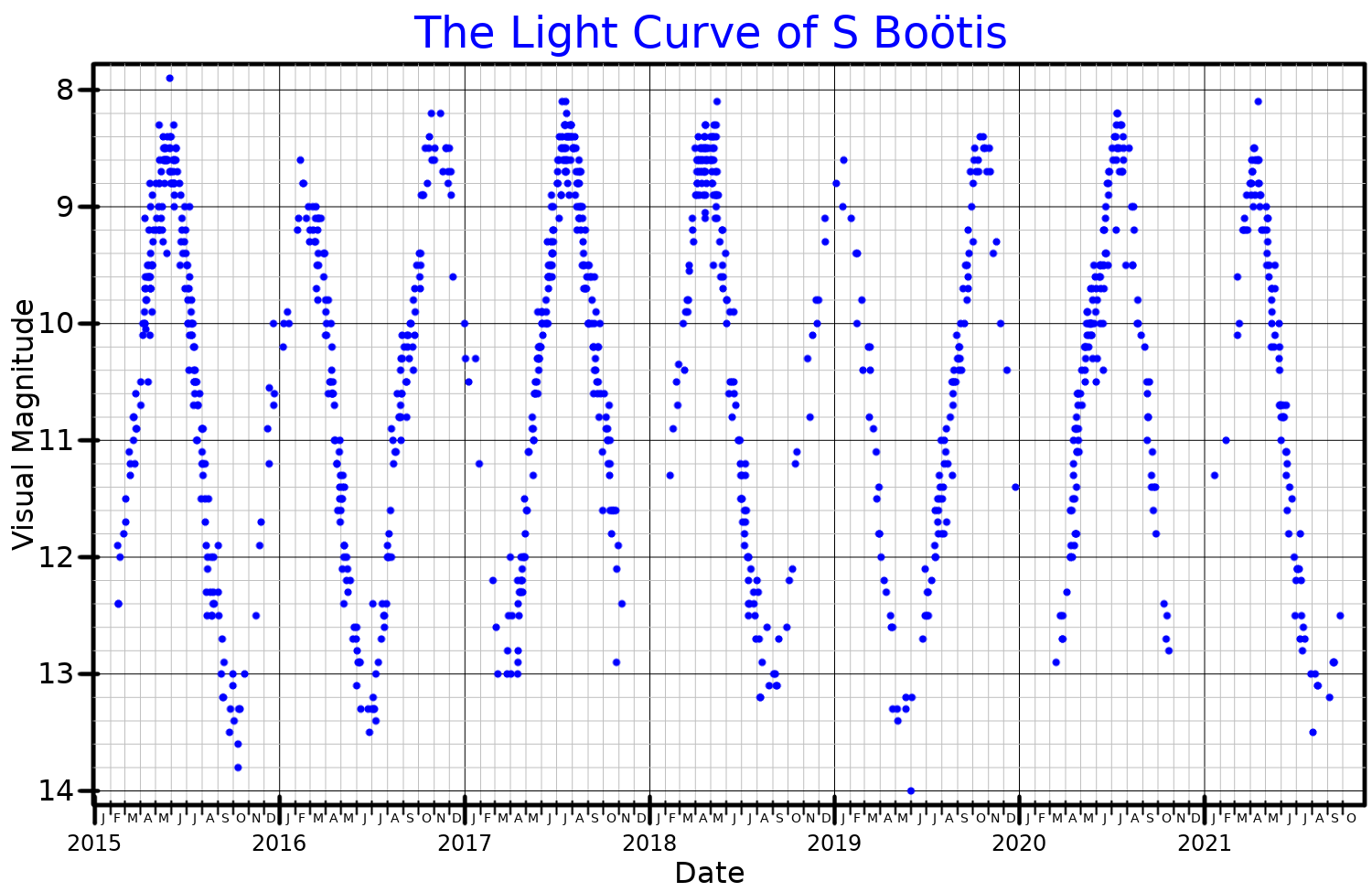
- The visual band light curve of S Boötes, from AAVSO data

Observation data Epoch J2000 Equinox ICRS
- Constellation: Boötes
- Right ascension: 14^{h} 22^{m} 52.9255^{s}
- Declination: +53° 48′ 37.307″
- Apparent magnitude (V): 7.4 - 14.0

Characteristics
- Evolutionary stage: AGB
- Spectral type: M3e-6e
- B−V color index: +1.3
- Variable type: Mira

Astrometry
Radial velocity (R_{v})	−17.00 km/s
Proper motion (μ)	RA: +7.283 mas/yr Dec.: −12.789 mas/yr
Parallax (π)	0.5746±0.0407 mas
Distance	5,700 ± 400 ly (1,700 ± 100 pc)

Details
Mass	2.7 M_{☉}
Radius	491 R_{☉}
Luminosity	18,793 L_{☉}
Surface gravity (log g)	−0.53 cgs
Temperature	3,007 K
Age	631 Myr

Other designations
- HIP 70291, SAO 29125, BD+54°1571, HD 126289

Database references
SIMBAD	data

S Boötis is a Mira variable in the constellation Boötes. It ranges between magnitudes 7.8 and 13.8 over a period of approximately 270 days. It is too faint to be seen with the naked eye; however, when it is near maximum brightness it can be seen with binoculars.

S Boötis was discovered at Bonn Observatory by Friedrich Wilhelm Argelander in 1860.
