= HD 148206 =

Mira variable star in the constellation Hercules

Observation data Epoch J2000.0 Equinox J2000.0
- Constellation: Hercules
- Right ascension: 16^{h} 25^{m} 47.48^{s}
- Declination: +18° 53′ 33.0″
- Apparent magnitude (V): 6.4 to 13.4 (Note: Visual magnitude range and spectral class as catalogued for the Mira-type variations.)

Characteristics
- Spectral type: M6.5e–M9.5e
- Variable type: Mira

Astrometry
Radial velocity (R_{v})	−15 km/s
Proper motion (μ)	RA: −11.03±0.53 mas/yr Dec.: −15.94±0.85 mas/yr
Parallax (π)	3.76±0.27 mas (VLBI)
Distance	870 ly (266 pc)

Details

Other designations
- U Herculis, HD 148206, HR 6119, BD+19°3098, HIP 80488, SAO 102160, IRAS 16235+1900, 2MASS J16254746+1853328

Database references
SIMBAD	data

U Herculis, also known as HD 148206, is a Mira variable star in the constellation of Hercules. It is an asymptotic giant branch (AGB) star surrounded by a circumstellar envelope in which maser emission from the SiO, H_{2}O and OH molecules has been detected.

== Variability ==
U Herculis is a long-period Mira variable, pulsating in the fundamental mode with a period of about 406 days. Analysis of two decades of monitoring gives an optical period of about 405 days, while the maser emission varies with a period of 407 ± 11 days, lagging the optical light curve by roughly two to three months. Its spectral type varies over the cycle in the range M6.5e–M9.5e, and its apparent magnitude changes by several magnitudes at visual wavelengths.

== Distance ==
Because Mira variables are large, cool and surrounded by dust, optical parallax measurements of U Herculis are uncertain. The Hipparcos mission and Gaia Early Data Release 3 give discrepant distances of about 235 pc and 424 pc respectively, a difference attributed to the effect of the star's extended, variable atmosphere on optical astrometry.

A more direct distance has been obtained from very-long-baseline interferometry (VLBI) of the 1667 MHz OH maser in the circumstellar shell. One of the maser spots was found to coincide with the stellar continuum amplified by the masing gas, allowing its position to be tied to extragalactic reference sources. From these observations the annual parallax was measured as 3.76 ± 0.27 mas, corresponding to a distance of 266+32
−28 pc (about 870 light-years).

== Circumstellar envelope and masers ==
U Herculis loses mass through a stellar wind at a rate of about 3.3×10^{−7} solar masses per year, with an envelope expansion velocity of roughly 13 km/s. The systemic velocity of the star is about −15 km/s.

The different maser species trace successive layers of the envelope. The 43 GHz SiO masers form a ring just above the photosphere, roughly 10–12 AU across, whose structure changes on timescales of months. Water vapour (H_{2}O) masers at 22 GHz arise from a shell with boundaries at about 11–25 AU. Farther out, OH main-line masers occupy a partially filled thick shell extending from about 50 to 135 AU from the star.
