= S Pictoris =

Variable star in the constellation Pictor

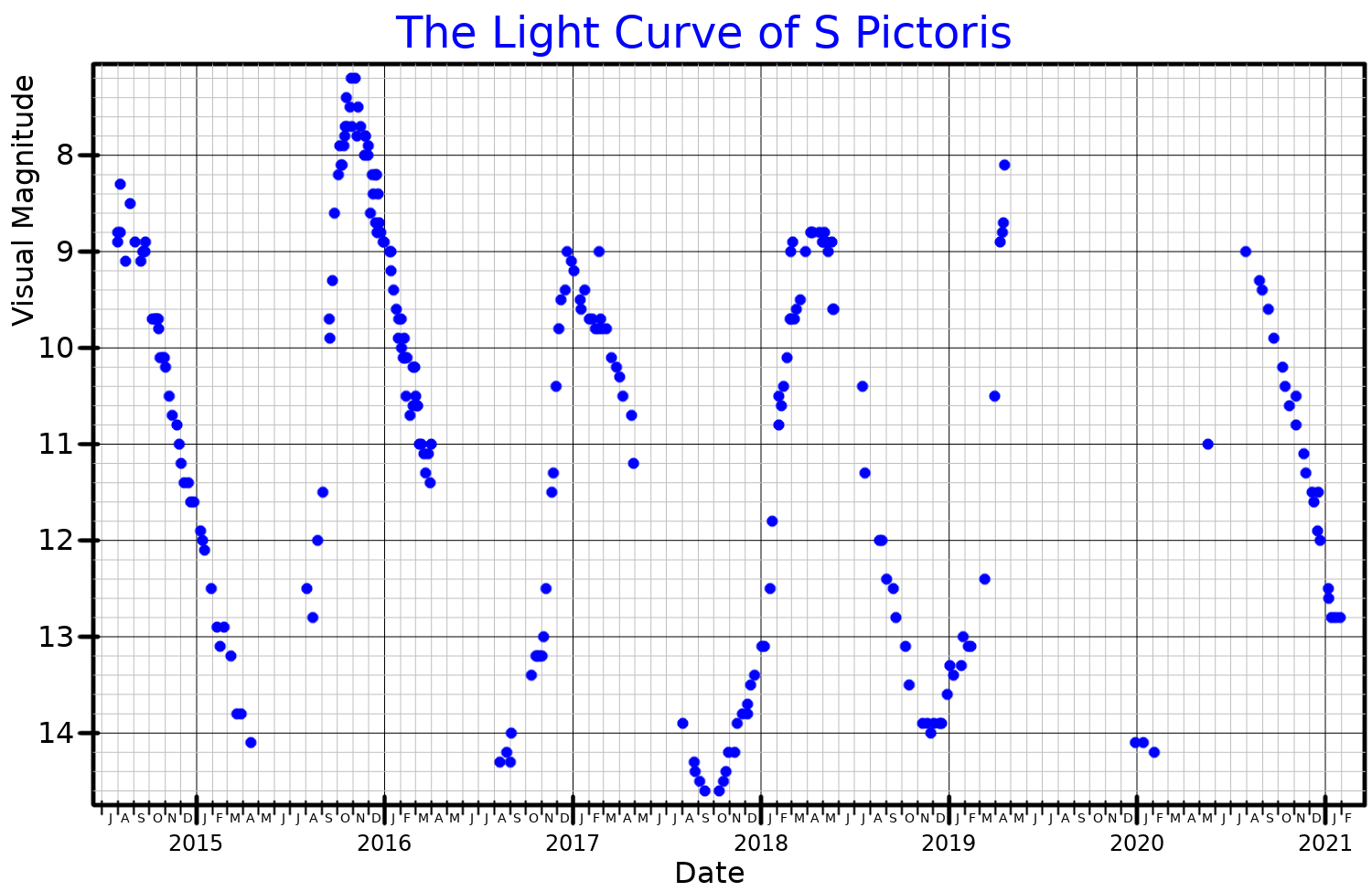
- The visual band light curve of S Pictoris, from AAVSO data

Observation data Epoch J2000 Equinox J2000
- Constellation: Pictor
- Right ascension: 05^{h} 10^{m} 57.24760^{s}
- Declination: −48° 30′ 25.4481″
- Apparent magnitude (V): 6.5 to 14.2

Characteristics
- Spectral type: M6.5e-M8III-IIe
- Variable type: Mira variable

Other designations
- CD−48 1671, HD 33894, HIP 24126

Database references
SIMBAD	data

S Pictoris is a Mira variable-type star in the constellation Pictor. It ranges between apparent magnitude 6.5 and 14.0, and spectral types M6.5e to M8III-IIe, over a period of 422 days.
