= R Aurigae =

Star in the constellation Auriga

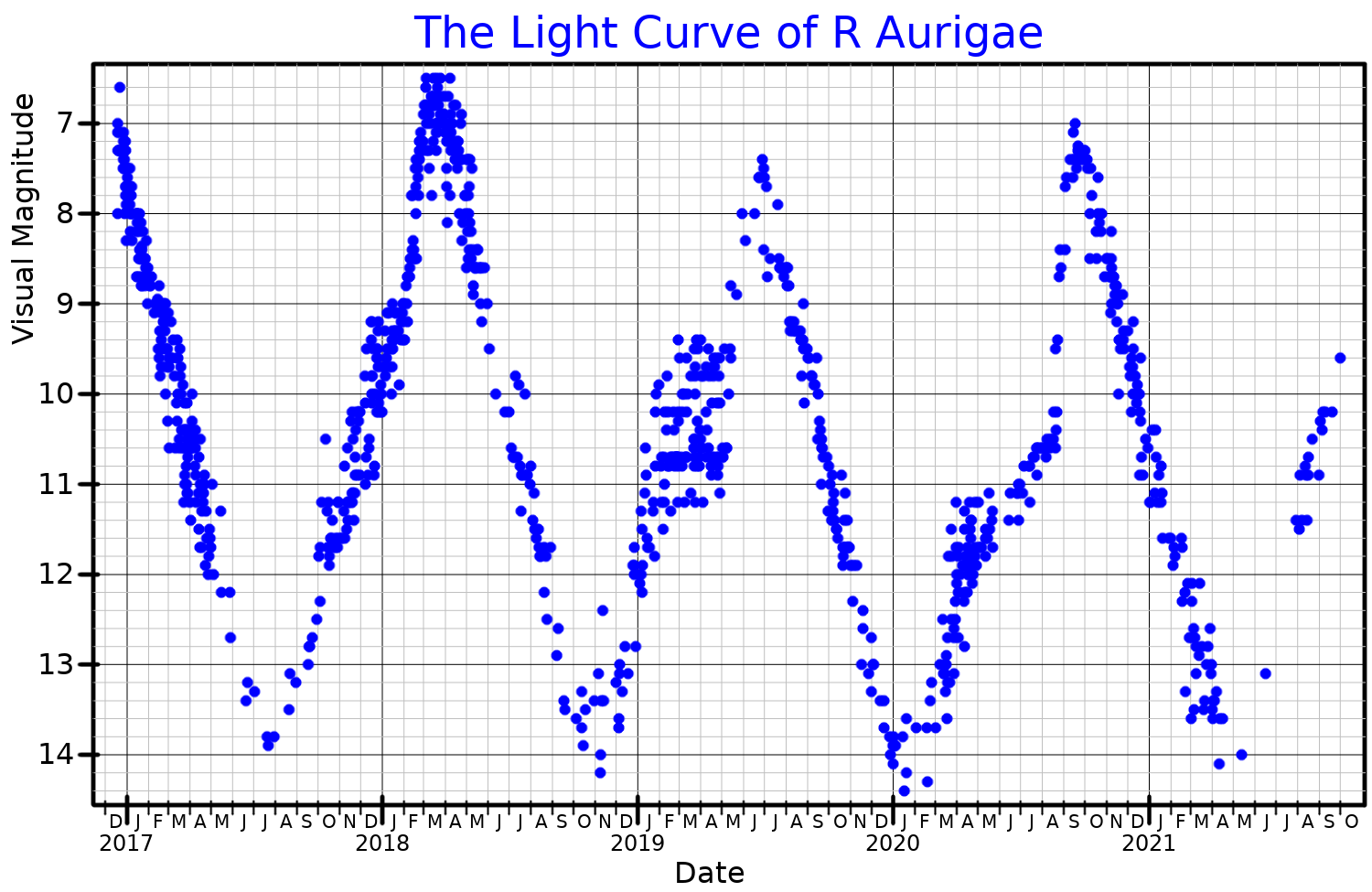
- The visual band light curve of R Aurigae, from AAVSO data

Observation data Epoch J2000.0 Equinox J2000.0 (ICRS)
- Constellation: Auriga
- Right ascension: 05^{h} 17^{m} 17.6916^{s}
- Declination: +53° 35′ 10.032″
- Apparent magnitude (V): 6.7 to 13.9

Characteristics
- Evolutionary stage: AGB
- Spectral type: M7IIIe (M6e - M9e)
- U−B color index: +0.27
- B−V color index: +1.66
- Variable type: Mira

Astrometry
Radial velocity (R_{v})	7.8±2 km/s
Proper motion (μ)	RA: +14.708 mas/yr Dec.: −14.685 mas/yr
Parallax (π)	3.4958±0.1327 mas
Distance	930 ± 40 ly (290 ± 10 pc)

Details
Mass	3.7 M_{☉}
Radius	740 R_{☉}
Luminosity	11,530 L_{☉}
Surface gravity (log g)	1.60 cgs
Temperature	2,385 K

Other designations
- R Aur, ADS 3845 A, BD+53 882, CCDM J05173+5335A, GC 6435, HD 34019, HIP 24645, HR 1707, IDS 05092+5328 A, SAO 25112

Database references
SIMBAD	data

R Aurigae (R Aur) is a Mira variable, a pulsating red giant star in the constellation of Auriga, at a distance of 930 light-years.

In 1862 R Aurigae was found to be a variable star at Bonn Observatory. It was widely observed in the late 19th century and its spectrum was described in 1890. In 1907 it appeared with its variable star designation in Annie Jump Cannon's Second Catalogue of Variable Stars. R Aurigae has an apparent visual magnitude which varies between 6.7 and 13.9 with a period of 450 days. The light curve varies strongly from cycle to cycle, sometimes having a pronounced hump on the ascending branch and usually having rise and fall times approximately equal. The cycle period has oscillated slowly between about 450 and 465 days.

R Aurigae is catalogued as a component of a double star, with the 10th magnitude HD 233095, although the two stars are unrelated.
