= R Boötis =

Star in the constellation Boötes

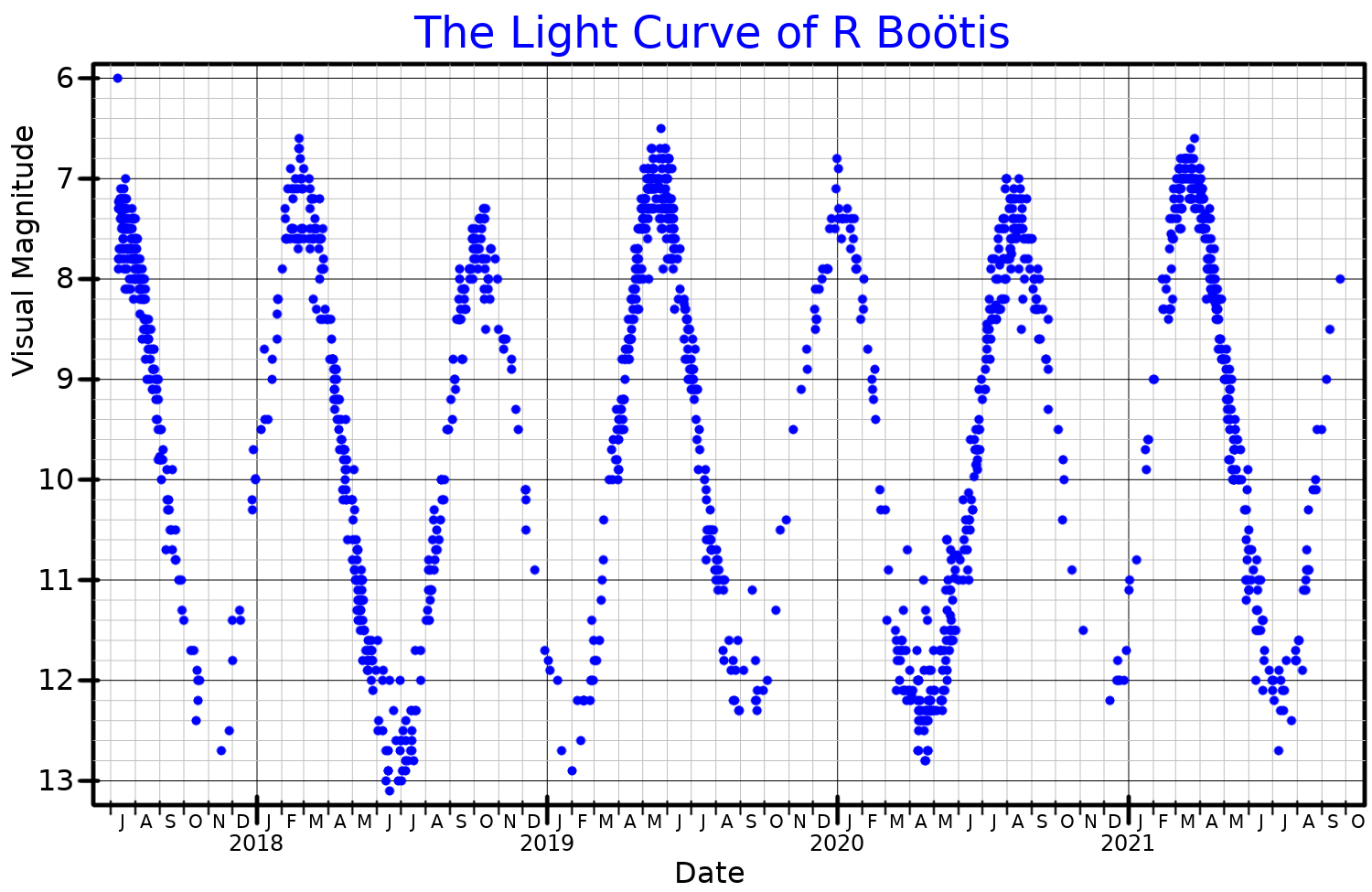
- The visual band light curve of R Boötis, from AAVSO data

Observation data Epoch J2000 Equinox ICRS
- Constellation: Boötes
- Right ascension: 14^{h} 37^{m} 11.57616^{s}
- Declination: 26° 44′ 11.6562″
- Apparent magnitude (V): 6.0 - 13.3

Characteristics
- Evolutionary stage: AGB
- Spectral type: M4-8e
- B−V color index: 1.50±0.51
- Variable type: Mira variable

Astrometry
Radial velocity (R_{v})	−58.0±4.7 km/s
Proper motion (μ)	RA: –25.537 mas/yr Dec.: 11.968 mas/yr
Parallax (π)	1.5204±0.0586 mas
Distance	2,150 ± 80 ly (660 ± 30 pc)

Details
Mass	1.492 M_{☉}
Radius	241 – 268 R_{☉}
Luminosity	4,255+1,009 −821 L_{☉}
Surface gravity (log g)	−0.33 or −0.25 cgs
Temperature	3,029 – 3,061 K
Metallicity [Fe/H]	+0.512 dex

Other designations
- R Boo, BD+27°2400, GC 19706, HD 128609, HIP 71490, SAO 83440

Database references
SIMBAD	data

R Boötis is a variable star in the northern constellation of Boötes. The star's brightness varies tremendously, ranging from apparent magnitude 6.0, when it might be faintly visible to the naked eye under very good observing conditions, to 13.3, when a fairly large telescope would be required to see it. The distance to this star is approximately 2,150 light years based on parallax measurements. It is drifting closer with a radial velocity of about −58 km/s.

The variability of this star was discovered by German astronomer F. W. Argelander in 1857. It is classified as a Mira-type pulsating variable that ranges in brightness from magnitude 6.0 down to 13.3 with a period of 223.11 days. The stellar classification of the star ranges from M4e to M8e, where the 'e' indicates emission features in the spectrum.

R Boötis is much larger and luminous than the Sun, at 4,000 solar luminosities and a size 250 times that of the Sun. It has cooled to an effective temperature of 3,000 Kelvins, giving it a reddish hue.
