= R Cancri =

Variable star in the constellation Cancer

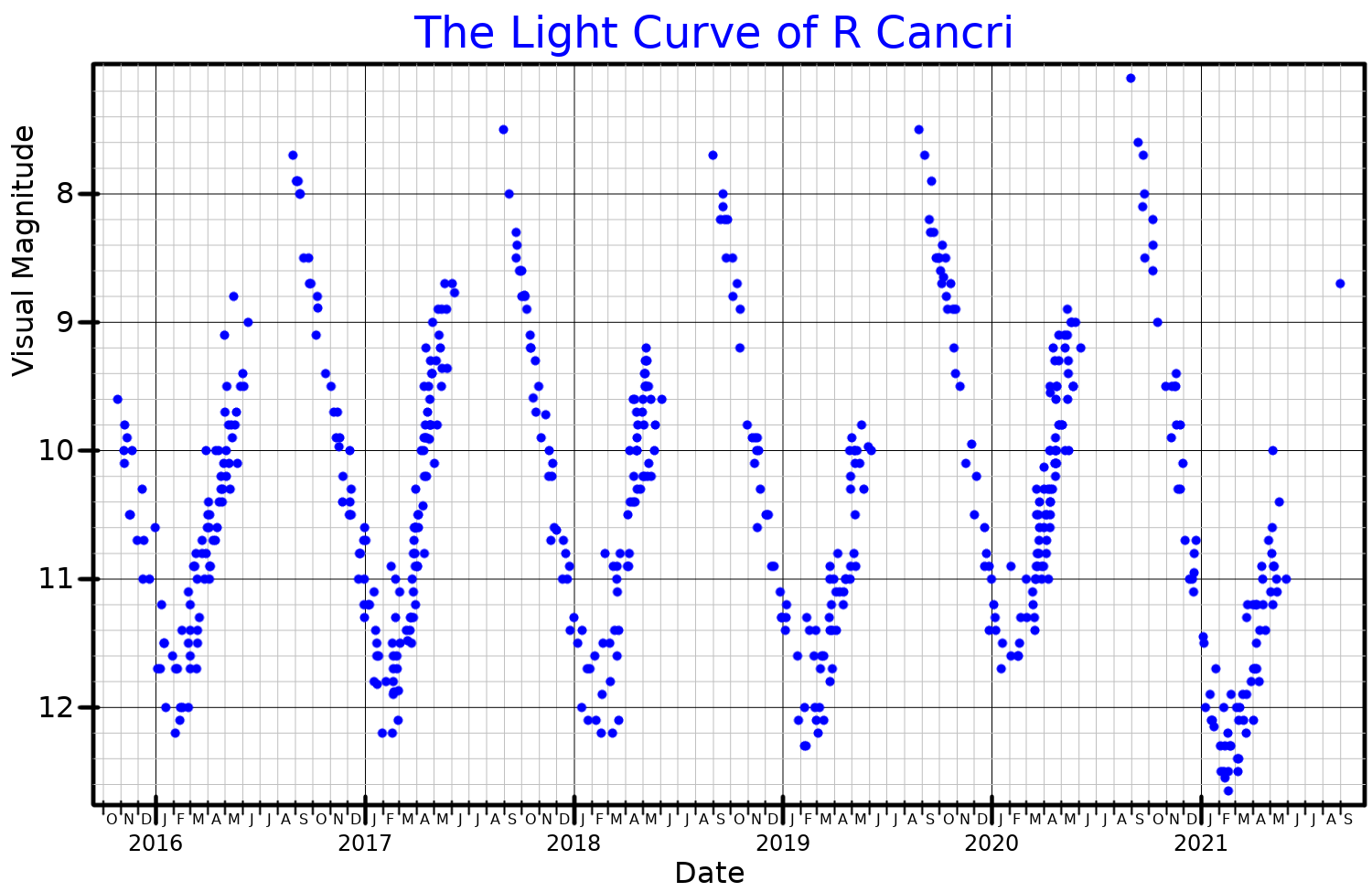
- The visual band light curve of R Cancri, from AAVSO data

Observation data Epoch J2000 Equinox ICRS
- Constellation: Cancer
- Right ascension: 08^{h} 16^{m} 33.82673^{s}
- Declination: +11° 43′ 34.4691″
- Apparent magnitude (V): 6.07 - 12.3

Characteristics
- Spectral type: M6e-M9e
- U−B color index: 0.49
- B−V color index: 1.53
- Variable type: Mira

Astrometry
Radial velocity (R_{v})	35.42 ± 0.52 km/s
Proper motion (μ)	RA: 0.635±0.195 mas/yr Dec.: −10.785±0.106 mas/yr
Parallax (π)	3.9375±0.1792 mas
Distance	854+36 −39 ly (262+11 −12 pc)

Details
Mass	1.43 M_{☉}
Radius	371±37 R_{☉}
Luminosity	5,700 (Note: Calculated using the given radius and temperature by the Stefan-Boltzmann law.) L_{☉}
Surface gravity (log g)	−0.69 cgs
Temperature	2,604±300 K
Metallicity [Fe/H]	+0.22 dex

Other designations
- BD+12°1803, HD 69243, HIP 40534, HR 3248, SAO 97694

Database references
SIMBAD	data

R Cancri is a Mira variable in the constellation Cancer. Located approximately 250 parsecs (830 ly) distant, it varies between magnitudes 6.07 and 12.3 over a period of approximately 357 days. At its brightest, it is very faintly visible to the naked eye.

Friedrich Magnus Schwerd discovered R Cancri in 1829. It was one of the first variable stars to be discovered.
