= Mira variable =

Type of variable star

Mira, the prototype of the Mira variables

Mira variables (/ˈmaɪrə/; named for the prototype star Mira) are a class of pulsating stars characterized by very red colours, pulsation periods longer than 100 days, and amplitudes greater than one magnitude in infrared and 2.5 magnitude at visual wavelengths. They are red giants in the very late stages of stellar evolution, on the asymptotic giant branch (AGB), that will expel their outer envelopes as planetary nebulae and become white dwarfs within a few million years.

Mira variables are stars massive enough that they have undergone helium fusion in their cores but are less than two solar masses, stars that have already lost about half their initial mass. However, they can be thousands of times more luminous than the Sun due to their very large distended envelopes. They are pulsating due to the entire star expanding and contracting. This produces a change in temperature along with radius, both of which factors cause the variation in luminosity. The pulsation depends on the mass and radius of the star and there is a well-defined relationship between period and luminosity (and colour). The very large visual amplitudes are not due to large luminosity changes, but due to a shifting of energy output between infra-red and visual wavelengths as the stars change temperature during their pulsations.

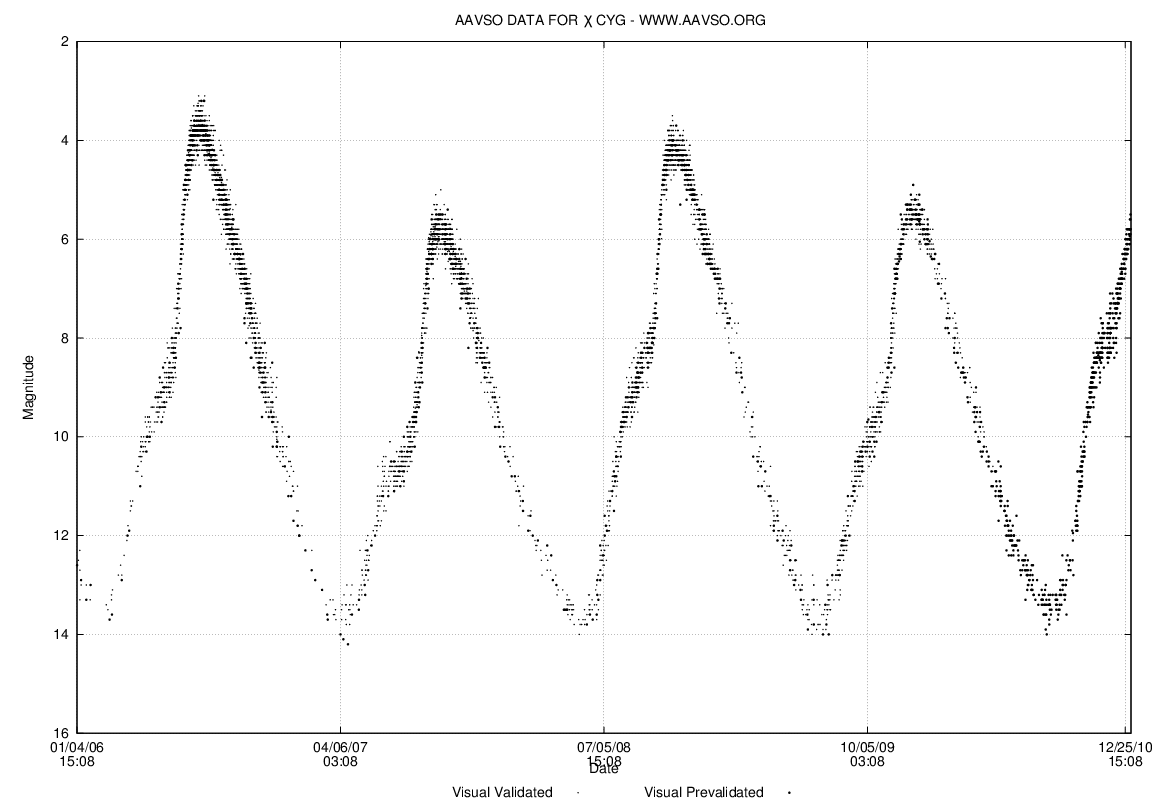
Light curve of χ Cygni

Early models of Mira stars assumed that the star remained spherically symmetric during this process (largely to keep the computer modelling simple, rather than for physical reasons). A recent survey of Mira variable stars found that 75% of the Mira stars which could be resolved using the IOTA telescope are not spherically symmetric, a result which is consistent with previous images of individual Mira stars, so there is now pressure to do realistic three-dimensional modelling of Mira stars on supercomputers.

Mira variables may be oxygen-rich or carbon-rich. Carbon-rich stars such as R Leporis arise from a narrow set of conditions that override the normal tendency for AGB stars to maintain a surplus of oxygen over carbon at their surfaces due to dredge-ups. Pulsating AGB stars such as Mira variables undergo fusion in alternating hydrogen and helium shells, which produces periodic deep convection known as dredge-ups. These dredge-ups bring carbon from the helium burning shell to the surface and would result in a carbon star. However, in stars above about 4 M_{☉}, hot bottom burning occurs. This is when the lower regions of the convective region are hot enough for significant CNO cycle fusion to take place which destroys much of the carbon before it can be transported to the surface. Thus more massive AGB stars do not become carbon-rich.

Mira variables are rapidly losing mass and this material often forms dust shrouds around the star. In some cases conditions are suitable for the formation of natural masers.

A small subset of Mira variables appear to change their period over time: the period increases or decreases by a substantial amount (up to a factor of three) over the course of several decades to a few centuries. This is believed to be caused by thermal pulses, where the helium shell reignites the outer hydrogen shell. This changes the structure of the star, which manifests itself as a change in period. This process is predicted to happen to all Mira variables, but the relatively short duration of thermal pulses (a few thousand years at most) over the asymptotic giant branch lifetime of the star (less than a million years), means we only see it in a few of the several thousand Mira stars known, possibly in R Hydrae. Most Mira variables do exhibit slight cycle-to-cycle changes in period, probably caused by nonlinear behaviour in the stellar envelope including deviations from spherical symmetry.

Mira variables are popular targets for amateur astronomers interested in variable star observations, because of their dramatic changes in brightness. Some Mira variables (including Mira itself) have reliable observations stretching back well over a century.

Visualisation of Mira type variable

== List ==
The following list contains selected Mira variables. Unless otherwise noted, the given magnitudes are in the V-band, and distances are from the Gaia DR2 star catalogue.

| Star | Brightest magnitude | Dimmest magnitude | Period (in days) | Distance (in parsecs) | Reference |
|---|---|---|---|---|---|
| Mira | 2.0 | 10.1 | 332 | 92+12 −9 | |
| Chi Cygni | 3.3 | 14.2 | 408 | 180+45 −30 | |
| R Hydrae | 3.5 | 10.9 | 380 | 224+56 −37 | |
| R Carinae | 3.9 | 10.5 | 307 | 387+81 −57 | |
| R Leonis | 4.4 | 11.3 | 310 | 71+5 −4 | |
| S Carinae | 4.5 | 9.9 | 149 | 497+22 −20 | |
| R Cassiopeiae | 4.7 | 13.5 | 430 | 187+9 −8 | |
| R Horologii | 4.7 | 14.3 | 408 | 313+40 −32 | |
| U Orionis | 4.8 | 13.0 | 377 | 216+19 −16 | |
| RR Scorpii | 5.0 | 12.4 | 281 | 277+18 −16 | |
| R Serpentis | 5.2 | 14.4 | 356 | 285+26 −22 | |
| T Cephei | 5.2 | 11.3 | 388 | 176+13 −12 | |
| R Aquarii | 5.2 | 12.4 | 387 | 320+31 −26 | |
| R Centauri | 5.3 | 11.8 | 502 | 385+159 −87 | |
| RR Sagittarii | 5.4 | 14 | 336 | 386+48 −38 | |
| R Trianguli | 5.4 | 12.6 | 267 | 933+353 −201 | |
| S Sculptoris | 5.5 | 13.6 | 367 | 1078+1137 −366 | |
| R Aquilae | 5.5 | 12.0 | 271 | 238+27 −22 | |
| R Leporis | 5.5 | 11.7 | 445 | 419+15 −14 | |
| W Hydrae | 5.6 | 9.6 | 390 | 164+25 −19 | |
| R Andromedae | 5.8 | 15.2 | 409 | 242+30 −24 | |
| S Coronae Borealis | 5.8 | 14.1 | 360 | 431+60 −47 | |
| U Cygni | 5.9 | 12.1 | 463 | 767+34 −31 | |
| X Ophiuchi | 5.9 | 8.6 | 338 | 215+15 −13 | |
| RS Scorpii | 6.0 | 13.0 | 319 | 709+306 −164 | |
| RT Sagittarii | 6.0 | 14.1 | 306 | 575+48 −41 | |
| RU Sagittarii | 6.0 | 13.8 | 240 | 1592+1009 −445 | |
| RT Cygni | 6.0 | 13.1 | 190 | 888+47 −43 | |
| R Geminorum | 6.0 | 14.0 | 370 | 1514+1055 −441 | |
| S Gruis | 6.0 | 15.0 | 402 | 671+109 −82 | |
| V Monocerotis | 6.0 | 13.9 | 341 | 426+50 −41 | |
| R Cancri | 6.1 | 11.9 | 357 | 226+32 −25 | |
| R Virginis | 6.1 | 12.1 | 146 | 530+28 −25 | |
| R Cygni | 6.1 | 14.4 | 426 | 674+47 −41 | |
| R Boötis | 6.2 | 13.1 | 223 | 702+60 −52 | |
| T Normae | 6.2 | 13.6 | 244 | 1116+168 −129 | |
| R Leonis Minoris | 6.3 | 13.2 | 372 | 347+653 −137 | |
| S Virginis | 6.3 | 13.2 | 375 | 729+273 −156 | |
| R Reticuli | 6.4 | 14.2 | 281 | 1553+350 −241 | |
| S Herculis | 6.4 | 13.8 | 304 | 477+27 −24 | |
| U Herculis | 6.4 | 13.4 | 404 | 572+53 −45 | |
| R Octantis | 6.4 | 13.2 | 407 | 504+46 −39 | |
| S Pictoris | 6.5 | 14.0 | 422 | 574+74 −59 | |
| R Ursae Majoris | 6.5 | 13.7 | 302 | 489+54 −44 | |
| R Canum Venaticorum | 6.5 | 12.9 | 329 | 661+65 −54 | |
| R Normae | 6.5 | 12.8 | 496 | 581+10000 −360 | |
| T Ursae Majoris | 6.6 | 13.5 | 257 | 1337+218 −164 | |
| R Aurigae | 6.7 | 13.9 | 458 | 227+21 −17 | |
| RU Herculis | 6.7 | 14.3 | 486 | 511+53 −44 | |
| R Draconis | 6.7 | 13.2 | 246 | 662+58 −49 | |
| V Coronae Borealis | 6.9 | 12.6 | 358 | 843+43 −39 | |
| T Cassiopeiae | 6.9 | 13.0 | 445 | 374+37 −31 | |
| R Pegasi | 6.9 | 13.8 | 378 | 353+35 −29 | |
| V Cassiopeiae | 6.9 | 13.4 | 229 | 298+15 −14 | |
| T Pavonis | 7.0 | 14.4 | 244 | 1606+340 −239 | |
| RS Virginis | 7.0 | 14.6 | 354 | 616+81 −64 | |
| Z Cygni | 7.1 | 14.7 | 264 | 654+36 −33 | |
| S Orionis | 7.2 | 13.1 | 434 | 538+120 −83 | |
| T Draconis | 7.2 | 13.5 | 422 | 783+48 −43 | |
| UV Aurigae | 7.3 | 10.9 | 394 | 1107+83 −72 | |
| W Aquilae | 7.3 | 14.3 | 490 | 321+22 −20 | |
| S Cephei | 7.4 | 12.9 | 487 | 531+23 −21 | |
| R Fornacis | 7.5 | 13.0 | 386 | 633+44 −38 | |
| RZ Pegasi | 7.6 | 13.6 | 437 | 1117+88 −76 | |
| RT Aquilae | 7.6 | 14.5 | 327 | 352+24 −21 | |
| V Cygni | 7.7 | 13.9 | 421 | 458+36 −31 | |
| RR Aquilae | 7.8 | 14.5 | 395 | 318+33 −28 | |
| S Boötis | 7.8 | 13.8 | 271 | 2589+552 −387 | |
| WX Cygni | 8.8 | 13.2 | 410 | 1126+86 −75 | |
| W Draconis | 8.9 | 15.4 | 279 | 6057+4469 −1805 | |
| R Capricorni | 8.9 | 14.9 | 343 | 1407+178 −142 | |
| UX Cygni | 9.0 | 17.0 | 569 | 5669+10000 −2760 | |
| LL Pegasi | 9.6 K | 11.6 K | 696 | 1300 | |
| TY Cassiopeiae | 10.1 | 19.0 | 645 | 1328+502 −286 | |
| IK Tauri | 10.8 | 16.5 | 470 | 285+36 −29 | |
| CW Leonis | 11.0 R | 14.8 R | 640 | 95+22 −15 | |
| TX Camelopardalis | 11.6 B | 17.7 B | 557 | 333+42 −33 | |
| LP Andromedae | 15.1 | 17.3 | 614 | 400+68 −51 | |

== See also ==
- Long-period variable star
- Semiregular variable star
