= List of stars in Circinus =

This is the list of notable stars in the constellation Circinus, sorted by decreasing brightness.

Name	B	Var	HD	HIP	RA	Dec	vis. mag.	abs. mag.	Dist. (ly)	Sp. class	Notes
α Cir	α		128898	71908	14^{h} 42^{m} 30.69^{s}	−64° 58′ 28.5″	3.18	2.11	53	F1Vp	Xami, rapidly oscillating Ap star, V_{max} = 3.17^{m}, V_{min} = 3.19^{m}, P = 0.004740 d
β Cir	β		135379	74824	15^{h} 17^{m} 30.96^{s}	−58° 48′ 03.2″	4.07	1.71	97	A3Va	has a brown dwarf (b)
γ Cir	γ		136415	75323	15^{h} 23^{m} 22.66^{s}	−59° 19′ 14.5″	4.48	−1.49	509	B5III + F8	γ Cas variable, V_{max} = 4.43^{m}, V_{min} = 4.52^{m}; double star
ε Cir	ε		135291	74837	15^{h} 17^{m} 38.89^{s}	−63° 36′ 37.8″	4.85	−0.44	373	K2.5III	
δ Cir	δ		135240	74778	15^{h} 16^{m} 56.90^{s}	−60° 57′ 26.1″	5.04	−6.42	6392	O8.5V	Algol variable, V_{max} = 5.04^{m}, V_{min} = 5.20^{m}, P = 3.902476 d
θ Cir	θ		131492	73129	14^{h} 56^{m} 44.00^{s}	−62° 46′ 51.6″	5.08	−1.96	834	B4Vnp	emission-line star; γ Cas variable, V_{max} = 4.81^{m}, V_{min} = 5.65^{m}
η Cir	η		132905	73776	15^{h} 04^{m} 48.05^{s}	−64° 01′ 52.9″	5.16	0.59	267	G8III	
HD 131342			131342	73036	14^{h} 55^{m} 34.71^{s}	−60° 06′ 50.0″	5.18	1.56	173	K1III	
HD 129422			129422	72131	14^{h} 45^{m} 17.25^{s}	−62° 52′ 31.6″	5.36	2.05	150	A7Vn	double star
HD 135591			135591	74941	15^{h} 18^{m} 49.15^{s}	−60° 29′ 46.8″	5.43		3500	O7Iab:	triple star
HD 125835			125835	70492	14^{h} 25^{m} 06.34^{s}	−68° 11′ 43.2″	5.56	−4.60	3505	A3Ib	α Cyg variable, V_{max} = 5.57^{m}, V_{min} = 5.61^{m}
HD 136359			136359	75308	15^{h} 23^{m} 10.60^{s}	−60° 39′ 25.6″	5.65	2.55	136	F7V	
HD 124471			124471	69763	14^{h} 16^{m} 38.73^{s}	−66° 35′ 16.4″	5.72	−3.52	2296	B1.5III	double star
HD 120404			120404	67664	13^{h} 51^{m} 47.42^{s}	−69° 24′ 04.5″	5.73	−1.26	815	K5/M0III	variable star, ΔV = 0.011^{m}, P = 172.11704 d
HD 120913			120913	67942	13^{h} 54^{m} 49.14^{s}	−67° 39′ 07.4″	5.74	−2.21	1268	K2III	
HD 135160			135160	74750	15^{h} 16^{m} 36.69^{s}	−60° 54′ 14.4″	5.74	−3.11	1918	B0.5V	emission-line star; double star; suspected variable
HD 126862			126862	71002	14^{h} 31^{m} 16.39^{s}	−67° 43′ 01.4″	5.84	1.21	274	K1III	double star
HD 126241			126241	70657	14^{h} 27^{m} 07.11^{s}	−65° 49′ 17.8″	5.87	−1.38	921	K3III	
CO Cir		CO	129954	72438	14^{h} 48^{m} 44.56^{s}	−66° 35′ 36.7″	5.91	−1.82	1144	B2.5V	Be star; variable
AX Cir		AX	130701	72773	14^{h} 52^{m} 35.27^{s}	−63° 48′ 35.3″	5.91	−1.55	1012	F8II + A/F	Cepheid variable, V_{max} = 5.65^{m}, V_{min} = 6.09^{m}, P = 5.273268 d
HD 121932			121932	68455	14^{h} 00^{m} 52.61^{s}	−66° 16′ 07.9″	5.96	1.53	251	F0V	double star
HD 128020			128020	71530	14^{h} 37^{m} 46.80^{s}	−67° 55′ 52.8″	6.03	3.78	92	F7V	
HD 123377			123377	69241	14^{h} 10^{m} 30.91^{s}	−70° 18′ 19.6″	6.07			K4II	triple star; slow irregular variable, V_{max} = 6.03^{m}, V_{min} = 6.07^{m}
HD 123492			123492	69298	14^{h} 11^{m} 01.93^{s}	−69° 43′ 09.4″	6.07	1.74	240	A6IV	
ζ Cir	ζ		131058	72965	14^{h} 54^{m} 42.59^{s}	−65° 59′ 27.8″	6.09	−1.79	1226	B3Vn	variable star, ΔV = 0.005^{m}, P = 3.72065 d
HD 129462			129462	72097	14^{h} 44^{m} 55.57^{s}	−58° 28′ 38.6″	6.10	0.85	366	K0III	
BU Cir		BU	129557	72121	14^{h} 45^{m} 10.97^{s}	−55° 36′ 05.8″	6.10	−2.52	1725	B2III	β Cep variable, ΔV = 0.02^{m}, P = 0.127552 d; double star
HD 121557			121557	68270	13^{h} 58^{m} 31.28^{s}	−65° 48′ 02.1″	6.20	0.15	528	K0III	double star
HD 128917			128917	71861	14^{h} 41^{m} 55.93^{s}	−58° 36′ 56.6″	6.21	2.98	144	F4V	
HD 130227			130227	72471	14^{h} 49^{m} 07.17^{s}	−56° 40′ 03.1″	6.21	1.31	312	K3III	suspected variable
HD 133792			133792	74181	15^{h} 09^{m} 25.54^{s}	−63° 38′ 34.4″	6.25	0.09	555	A0p	
HD 134468			134468	74470	15^{h} 13^{m} 01.03^{s}	−61° 44′ 37.6″	6.27	−5.56	7581	K4Ib	suspected variable
HD 134060			134060	74273	15^{h} 10^{m} 44.97^{s}	−61° 25′ 20.3″	6.29	4.38	79	G3IV	has two planets (b & c)
HD 125990			125990	70528	14^{h} 25^{m} 39.80^{s}	−66° 10′ 22.4″	6.36	0.82	418	A1V	
HD 134657			134657	74552	15^{h} 13^{m} 59.19^{s}	−61° 20′ 34.5″	6.36	−0.67	830	B5V	double star
HD 130942			130942	72983	14^{h} 54^{m} 54.05^{s}	−69° 51′ 39.3″	6.38	−0.89	926	B5V	
HD 129092			129092	72000	14^{h} 43^{m} 28.15^{s}	−62° 58′ 00.0″	6.39	−1.47	1216	B3V:	triple star; suspected variable. V_{max} = 6.33^{m}, V_{min} = 6.39^{m}
HD 131491			131491	73118	14^{h} 56^{m} 38.35^{s}	−62° 21′ 51.9″	6.39	−1.07	1012	B5V	double star
HD 133557			133557	74044	15^{h} 07^{m} 56.15^{s}	−61° 07′ 43.2″	6.49	1.01	406	F2III	
HD 130021			130021	72518	14^{h} 49^{m} 37.06^{s}	−68° 56′ 10.2″	6.50	−0.58	851	B3III	variable star, ΔV = 0.008^{m}, P = 1.94001 d
HD 136003	ν (Note: Labelled Nu Circini (ν Cir/ν Circini) by Bode in his Uranographia)		136003	75095	15^{h} 20^{m} 42.82^{s}	―56° 07′ 57.4″	6.80		2,652	B2Ib	
HD 132481	ι (Note: Labelled Iota Circini (ι Cir/ι Circini) by Bode in his Uranographia)		132481	73522	15^{h} 01^{m} 38.38^{s}	―56° 15′ 36.6″	6.89		9,593	B2Vn	
BP Cir		BP	129708	72264	14^{h} 46^{m} 41.98^{s}	−61° 27′ 43.0″	7.52			F2/F3II+B6.0	Cepheid variable, V_{max} = 7.37^{m}, V_{min} = 7.71^{m}, P = 2.39810 d
HD 129445			129445	72203	14^{h} 46^{m} 03.06^{s}	−68° 45′ 45.9″	8.81	4.66	221	G8V	has a planet (b)
WR 70			137603	79863	15^{h} 29^{m} 44.69^{s}	−58° 34′ 51.3″	9.71		1840	WC9+B0I	Wolf–Rayet star
WR 66		CC	134877	74634	15^{h} 14^{m} 57.72^{s}	−59° 50′ 30.3″	11.34			WN8(h)	Wolf–Rayet star, ΔV = 0.1^{m}
WR 65					15^{h} 13^{m} 41.71^{s}	−59° 11′ 44.98″	13.65			WC9d+OB	Wolf–Rayet star
WR 67					15^{h} 15^{m} 32.627^{s}	−59° 02′ 30.7″	11.84			WN6w	Wolf–Rayet star
WR 67a					15^{h} 16^{m} 36.961^{s}	−58° 09′ 58.79″	16.25			WN6h	Wolf–Rayet star
WR 67b					15^{h} 17^{m} 46.301^{s}	−57° 56′ 59.29″	17.27			WC8	Wolf–Rayet star
WR 67-3					15^{h} 15^{m} 39.42^{s}	−58° 08′ 16.1″	15.33			WN10	Wolf–Rayet star
WR 68					15^{h} 18^{m} 20.758^{s}	−59° 38′ 17.32″	13.28			WC7	Wolf–Rayet star
WR 68a					15^{h} 23^{m} 16.617^{s}	−57° 44′ 19.79″	13.2			WN6+O5.5/6	Wolf–Rayet star
WR 68-1					15^{h} 20^{m} 35.923^{s}	−57° 27′ 11.95″	invisible			WN4b	Wolf–Rayet star, completely invisible in the visible spectrum due to dust extinction
BX Cir		BX			14^{h} 01^{m} 36.47^{s}	−66° 09′ 56.3″	12.62			B+...	prototype BX Circini variable, V_{max} = 12.57^{m}, V_{min} = 12.62^{m}, P = 0.10658 d
BW Cir		BW			13^{h} 58^{m} 09.92^{s}	−64° 44′ 04.9″	16.9				low-mass X-ray binary
Circinus X-1		BR			15^{h} 20^{m} 40.85^{s}	−57° 10′ 00.1″	21.4				low-mass X-ray binary
PSR B1451-68					14^{h} 56^{m} 00.03^{s}	−68° 43′ 40.0″					pulsar
PSR B1509-58					15^{h} 13^{m} 55.52^{s}	−59° 08′ 08.8″					pulsar
Table legend: • Name = Proper name • B = Bayer designation • F or/and G. = Flamsteed designation or Gould designation • Var = Variable star designation • HD = Henry Draper Catalogue designation number • HIP = Hipparcos Catalogue designation number • RA = Right ascension for the Epoch/Equinox J2000.0 • Dec = Declination for the Epoch/Equinox J2000.0 • vis. mag. = visual magnitude (m or m_{v}), also known as apparent magnitude • abs. mag. = absolute magnitude (M_{v}) • Dist. (ly) = Distance in light-years from Earth • Sp. class = Spectral class of the star in the stellar classification system • Notes = Common name(s) or alternate name(s); comments; notable properties [for example: multiple star status, range of variability if it is a variable star, exoplanets, etc.]

== See also ==
- List of stars by constellation
