= Circinus (disambiguation) =

Circinus may refer to:

- Circinus, the Latin for a compass (drafting), a tool for drawing arcs and circles
- Circinus (constellation), a small constellation of the southern winter sky, said to resemble a compass
- Circinus Galaxy, a galaxy, also known as ESO 97-G13, in the Circinus constellation
