= NGC 5315 =

Planetary nebula in the constellation Circinus

Emission nebula
- Planetary nebula
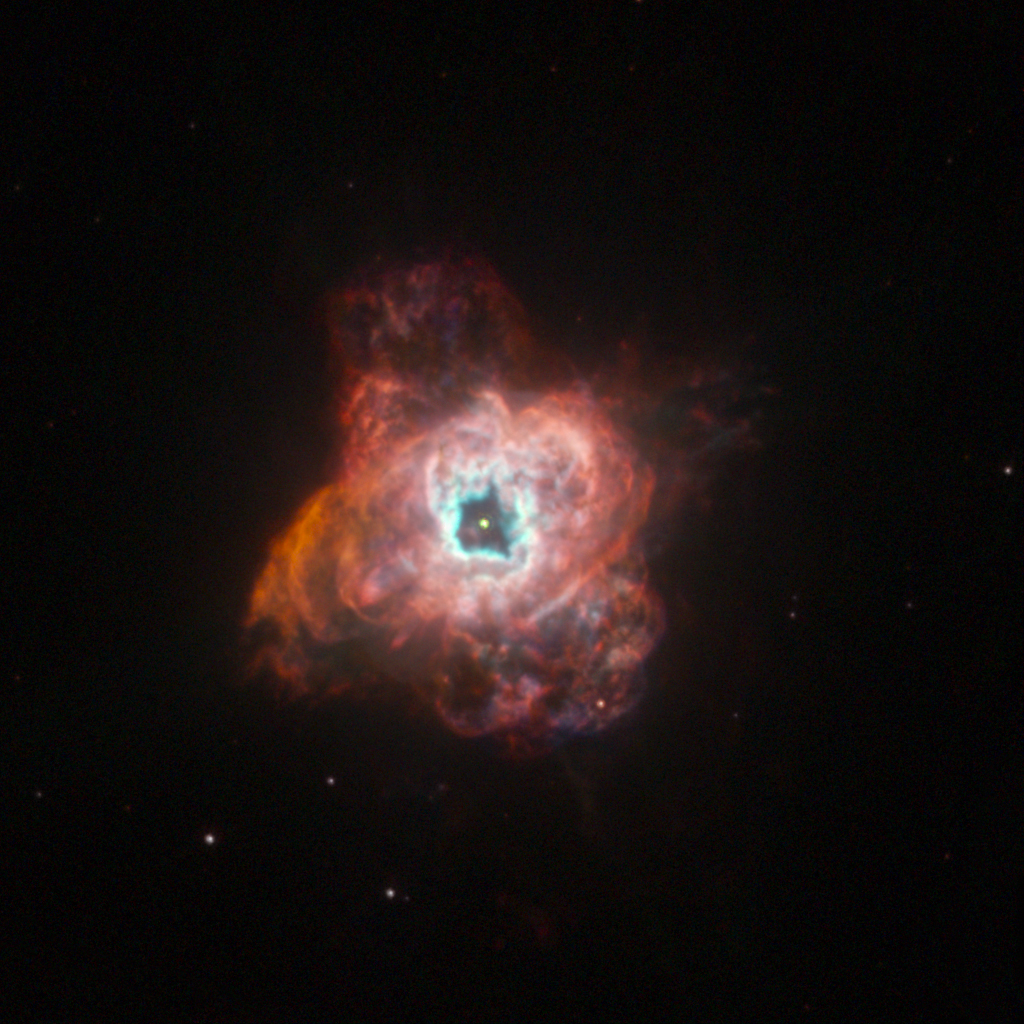
- A Hubble Space Telescope (HST) image of NGC 5315

Observation data: J2000 epoch
- Right ascension: 13^{h} 53^{m} 56.96097^{s}
- Declination: −66° 30′ 50.9155″
- Distance: ~6.5 kly (2 kpc). ly
- Apparent magnitude (V): 9.8
- Constellation: Circinus
- Designations: ESO 97-9, HD 120800, NGC 5315, PN G309.1-04.3

NGC 5315 is a planetary nebula in the southern constellation Circinus. Of apparent magnitude 9.8 around a central star of magnitude 14.2, it is located 5.2 degrees west-southwest of Alpha Circini. It is only visible as a disc at magnifications over 200-fold. The nebula was discovered by astronomer Ralph Copeland in 1883. The central star has a stellar class of WC4 and is hydrogen deficient with an effective temperature of 76-79 kK. The distance to this nebula is not known accurately, but is estimated to be around 6.5 kilolight-years.

This planetary nebular has a slightly elliptical form, a complex structure, and a ring that is somewhat broken. It shows a typical abundance of carbon and a slightly enhanced nitrogen abundance. Radial velocity studies indicate that the star may be a member of a binary system. The nebula does not show enrichment of s-process elements. This suggests that the star's asymptotic giant branch stage may have been truncated by interaction with the companion. Alternatively, the star may be low in mass and did not undergo third dredge-up, or the star's s-process elements were heavily diluted by the envelope during the AGB phase.
