= Circinus in Chinese astronomy =

According to traditional Chinese uranography, the modern constellation Circinus is located within the eastern quadrant of the sky, which is symbolized as the Azure Dragon of the East (東方青龍, Dōng Fāng Qīng Lóng).

The name of the western constellation in modern Chinese is 圓規座 (yuán guī zuò), meaning "the compass constellation".

== Stars ==
The map of Chinese constellation in constellation Circinus area consists of:

Four Symbols	Mansion (Chinese name)	Romanization	Translation	Asterisms (Chinese name)	Romanization	Translation	Western star name	Proper Name	Chinese star name	Romanization	Translation
Azure Dragon of the East (東方青龍)	角	Jiǎo	Horn	南門	Nánmén	Southern Gate	α Cir	Xami	南門增二	Nánménzēngèr	2nd additional star

== See also ==
- Traditional Chinese star names
- Chinese constellations
