= Epsilon Circini =

Star in the constellation Circinus

ε Circini
- Location of ε Circini (circled in red)

Observation data Epoch J2000.0 Equinox J2000.0 (ICRS)
- Constellation: Circinus
- Right ascension: 15^{h} 17^{m} 38.89307^{s}
- Declination: −63° 36′ 37.6831″
- Apparent magnitude (V): 4.86

Characteristics
- Evolutionary stage: red giant branch
- Spectral type: K2.5 III
- U−B color index: +1.32
- B−V color index: +1.260±0.004

Astrometry
Radial velocity (R_{v})	−3.72±0.42 km/s
Proper motion (μ)	RA: +3.209 mas/yr Dec.: +9.344 mas/yr
Parallax (π)	7.5809±0.1085 mas
Distance	430 ± 6 ly (132 ± 2 pc)
Absolute magnitude (M_{V})	−0.63

Details
Mass	4.3 M_{☉}
Radius	24 R_{☉}
Luminosity	338 L_{☉}
Surface gravity (log g)	2.22 cgs
Temperature	4,767 K

Other designations
- ε Cir, CPD−63°3544, FK5 3205, HD 135291, HIP 74837, HR 5666, SAO 253088

Database references
SIMBAD	data

Epsilon Circini is a solitary star located in the southern constellation of Circinus. Its name is a Bayer designation that is Latinized from ε Circini, and abbreviated Epsilon Cir or ε Cir. This star is faintly visible to the naked eye, having an apparent visual magnitude of 4.86. The distance to this star, as determined by a measured annual parallax shift of 7.58 mas, is around 430 light-years (132 pc). It is drifting closer to the Sun with a radial velocity of −4 km/s.

This is an evolved K-type giant star with a stellar classification of K2.5 III. With the supply of hydrogen at its core exhausted, the star has cooled and expanded to 24 times the girth of the Sun. It radiates about 338 times the solar luminosity from its photosphere at an effective temperature of 4,767 K.
