= Theta Circini =

Star in the constellation Circinus

θ Circini
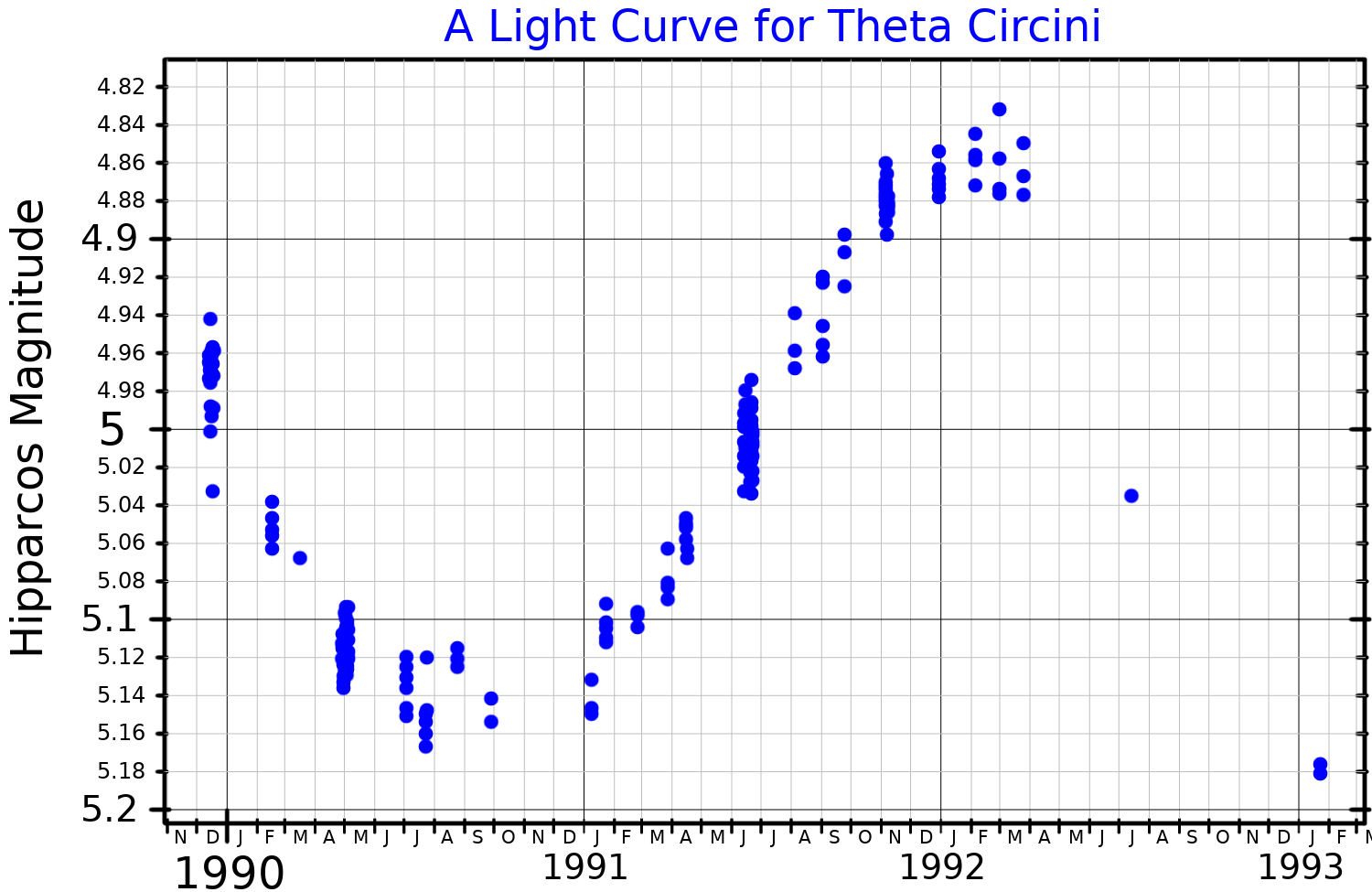
- A light curve for Theta Circini, plotted from Hipparcos data

Observation data Epoch J2000.0 Equinox J2000.0 (ICRS)
- Constellation: Circinus
- Right ascension: 14^{h} 56^{m} 43.987^{s}
- Declination: −62° 46′ 51.66″
- Apparent magnitude (V): 4.81 to 5.65 (5.90 + 5.90)

Characteristics
- Spectral type: B3 Ve (B2 + B2)
- B−V color index: +0.00
- Variable type: GCAS

Astrometry
| Proper motion (μ) | RA: +102.65 mas/yr Dec.: +9.35 mas/yr |
| Parallax (π) | 11.82±0.30 mas |
| Distance | 276 ± 7 ly (85 ± 2 pc) |
| Absolute magnitude (M_{V}) | −2.43/−2.43 |

Orbit
| Period (P) | 38.2±0.2 yr |
| Semi-major axis (a) | 0.08808±0.00073″ |
| Eccentricity (e) | 0.2775±0.0080 |
| Inclination (i) | 146.8±1.8° |
| Longitude of the node (Ω) | 223.8±3.0° |
| Periastron epoch (T) | 1993.76±0.24 |
| Argument of periastron (ω) (secondary) | 64.7±4.9° |

Details

θ Cir A
| Mass | 9.3±0.6 M_{☉} |
| Surface gravity (log g) | 3.38 cgs |
| Temperature | 19,099 K |
| Rotational velocity (v sin i) | 195±13 km/s |
| Age | 27.1±6.1 Myr |

Other designations
- θ Cir, CD−62°891, HD 131492, HIP 73129, HR 5551, SAO 252965

Database references
| SIMBAD | data |

Theta Circini (θ Cir), is a binary star located in the southern constellation of Circinus, to the northwest of Alpha Circini. Its name is a Bayer designation that is Latinized from θ Circini, and abbreviated Theta Cir or θ Cir. This system is faintly visible to the naked eye as a point of light with an apparent visual magnitude of about five. Based upon an annual parallax shift of 11.82 mas, it is located at a distance of about 276 light years from the Sun.

This is an astrometric binary star system with an orbital period of about 38.2 years, an eccentricity of 0.2775, and an angular semimajor axis of 0.08808". The pair show a combined stellar classification of B3 Ve, which matches a B-type main sequence star. The 'e' suffix on the class indicates this is a Be star. Alternate classifications include B4 Vnp and B4npe, with the 'n' indicating broad ("nebulous") absorption lines due to rotation and the 'p' meaning a chemically peculiar star. The two components appear to have similar visual magnitude, mass, and classification. The system behaves as a Gamma Cassiopeiae variable showing occasional outbursts of up to 0.27 in magnitude.
