= MN18 =

Star in the constellation Circinus

Observation data Epoch J2000 Equinox J2000
- Constellation: Circinus
- Right ascension: 15^{h} 16^{m} 41.001^{s}
- Declination: −58° 22′ 25.96″
- Apparent magnitude (V): 13.4

Characteristics
- Evolutionary stage: Blue supergiant
- Spectral type: B1Ia

Astrometry
Parallax (π)	0.1714±0.0192 mas
Distance	18,200 ly (5,600 pc)
Absolute magnitude (M_{V})	−6.8

Details
Radius	38.5 R_{☉}
Luminosity	263,000 L_{☉}
Temperature	21,100 K
Rotational velocity (v sin i)	90 km/s
Age	5.5 Myr

Other designations
- MN18, IRAS 15127-5811, 2MASS J15164101-5822260

Database references
SIMBAD	data

MN18 is a blue supergiant in the constellation of Circinus, about 5.6 kiloparsecs away, or about 18,300 light years away, likely in the open cluster Lynga 3. MN18 is surrounded by a bipolar nebula, quite uncommon around blue supergiants, and some other examples of blue supergiants with bipolar nebulae include HD 168625, Sher 25 and SBW 1.

== Properties ==
Fitting the star's spectrum with synthetic models suggests that it has a temperature of around 21,100 K. Assuming an absolute magnitude of -6.8 (typical for B1 supergiants) and its temperature, it probably has a luminosity around 260,000 times that of the Sun, and so it's probably about 38.5 times the size of the Sun. These parameters can be mostly replicated with a model of a 5.5 million year old star with an initial mass of 30 solar masses, what MN18's initial conditions might have been, which means that MN18 might be about 5.5 million years old. However, that model has significantly different carbon, nitrogen and oxygen abundances compared to MN18, for example, the nitrogen abundance is much lower in the synthetic model than in MN18.

The star is heavily reddened, with E(B-V) of 1.97, because of the huge amounts of dust between it and us. Also because of this dust, it is heavily obscured with a visual extinction of 6.4222 magnitudes. This means that only 1/371 of its light reaches us, and the rest (most of the light) is absorbed by the aforementioned dust.

== Bipolar Nebula ==
MN18's bipolar nebula measures approximately 1.7 by 2.5 arcminutes across, and appears as two lobes extending for about 70 arcsec in the northwest and southeast directions from a bright ring (the most visible section) centred on MN18. At a distance of 5.6 kpc, the extent of the lobes from the central star is about 1.9 parsecs (about 6.2 light years), which means that this bipolar nebula's diameter should be about 3.8 parsecs (about 12.4 light years). At a distance of 5.6 kpc, the ring would have a radius of 0.29 parsecs (about 0.95 light years). This, combined with the expanding velocity of the ring suggests a kinematic age of around 37,000 years.

=== Origin ===
The formation of the ring surrounding the star was probably due to MN18's past very high rotational velocity. Such high rotational velocities likely means that MN18 was or still is a member of a close binary system. If this is the case, then MN18 has likely suffered a lot of angular momentum loss on a time scale less than the age of the ring, suggested by its presently moderate rotational velocity, which could be explained by a strong magnetic field and a high mass loss rate, possible in merging binary systems because of the strong shear created.

=== Arc ===
There is a bright arc-like feature attached to the southwestern edge of the southeastern lobe of the nebula surrounding MN18, and there is a star within this arc, near its apex. This star is listed as a member of Lynga 3 as number 11 (hence its designation of Lynga 3-11). The arc-like feature is likely created from interaction between Lynga 3-11's stellar wind and MN18's bipolar nebula, evidenced by enhanced brightness near the supposed place of contact between nebula and stellar wind. If this is true, than Lynga 3-11 should have a strong stellar wind, i.e. an OB star. Its spectral type (derived from its different magnitudes in different wavelengths, recorded by 2MASS) is estimated to be O6V, assuming a distance of 5.6 kpc, but it could be earlier or later depending on its exact distance.

== Cluster Membership ==
MN18 is a possible member of the open cluster Lynga 3, however as Lynga 3 appeared to be an older cluster (its age is estimated to be about 832 million years old, compared to MN18's 5.5-10 million years old), this membership was doubted. Then a nearby star, 2MASS J15164297-5822197, was discovered to be a massive late-O or early-B type star, i.e. hotter than MN18. The presence of a massive and so rare star so close to MN18 suggests that they could be in the same star cluster, i.e. Lynga 3. This star could be either 4.7 or 7 kpc away, which is compatible with MN18's 5.6 kpc's margin of error (+1.5 -1.2 kpc), supporting the supposition that both stars might be members of the same cluster. However, the mean radial velocity of the spectral lines of 2MASS J15164297-5822197 is more than twice that of MN18. Although this difference might indicate that the two stars are unrelated to each other and are simply projected by chance along the same line-of-sight, it could also mean that this star is a massive binary.

The presence of Lynga 3-11, likely another massive star, is also potential evidence for Lynga 3's young cluster status, but more observations of this star and other stars listed as members of Lynga 3 are required to check whether or not they are part of MN18's parent cluster, Lynga 3.
