= Pismis 20 =

Compact cluster in constellation Circinus

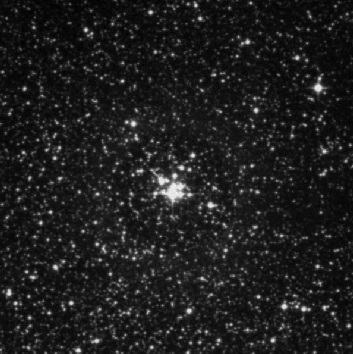

Observation data (J2000 epoch)
- Right ascension: 15^{h} 15^{m} 23.0^{s}
- Declination: −59° 04′ 00″
- Distance: 3,270 pc

Physical characteristics
- Estimated age: 5×10^{6} years
- Other designations: VDBH 170, MWSC 2281, C 1511-588, OCl 932

Associations
- Constellation: Circinus

Pismis 20 is a compact open cluster in Circinus. It is located at the heart of the Circinus OB1 association in the Norma Arm of the Milky Way Galaxy. Pismis 20 is about 3,270 pc away and only about 5 million years old. HD 134959, a blue supergiant variable star also called CX Circinus, is the brightest star in Pismis 20.

Prominent stars
Star name	MV number	Effective temperature	Absolute magnitude	Bolometric magnitude	Mass (M_{☉})	Spectral type	Ref.
WR 67	11	56000	-4.03	-8	9	WN6-w	
CX Circinus (HD 134959)	1	20900	-7.9	-9.8	50	B2.5Ia	
	6	42600	-4.2	-8.2	34	B	
	2	34400	-5.4	-8.8	34	O8.5I	
	3	28800	-5.5	-8.4	26	B0I	
	7	30200	-5	-8	23	B0III	
	4	29500	-5	-7.9	23	B0.2III	
	5	30200	-4.5	-7.5	20	B0III	
