= NGC 5822 =

Open cluster in the constellation Lupus

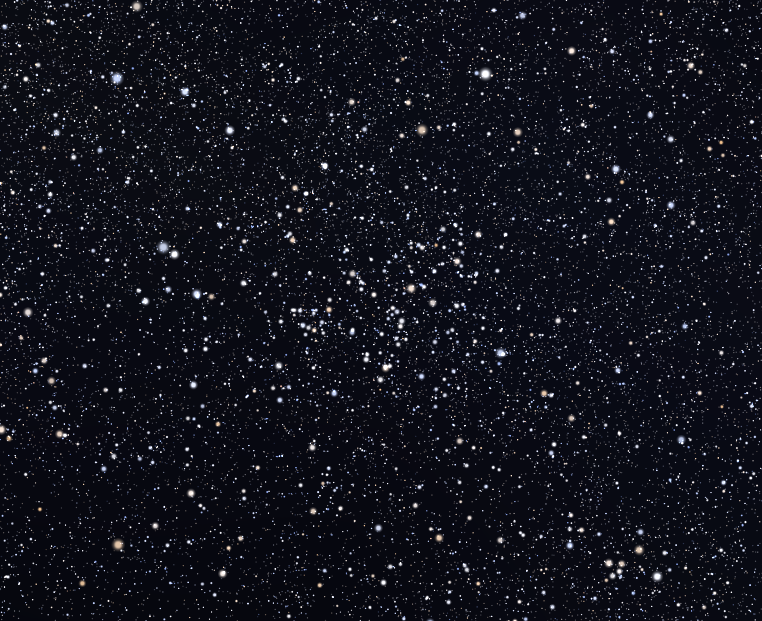
- NGC 5822 (taken from Stellarium)

Observation data (J2000 epoch)
- Right ascension: 15^{h} 4^{m} 21.(2)^{s}
- Declination: −54° 23′ 5(8)″
- Distance: 2,682 ly (822.3 pc)
- Apparent magnitude (V): 6.5

Physical characteristics
- Mass: ~1.7×10^{3} M_{☉}
- Radius: 26.1 ± 1.3 ly (8.0 ± 0.4 pc)
- Estimated age: 900±100 Myr
- Other designations: NGC 5822, Cr 289, ESO 176-SC 009

Associations
- Constellation: Lupus

NGC 5822 is an open cluster of stars in the southern constellation of Lupus. It was discovered by English Astronomer John Herschel on July 3, 1836, and lies close to another cluster, NGC 5823, which suggests there may be a physical association.

NGC 5822 is an intermediate age cluster, estimated at around 900 million years old, and it is located nearby at a distance of 2,700 light years. The Trumpler class of this cluster is III 2m. It is richly populated with half the cluster members lying within an angular radius of 22.1′. The cluster is considered low mass at ~1,700 times the mass of the Sun. It has a core radius of 1.1±0.1 pc and a limiting radius of 8.0±0.4 pc.

Measuring the abundances of a set of F-type stars that are probable members demonstrates the cluster metallicity is very similar to the Sun. It displays an extended main sequence turnoff on the Hertzsprung–Russell diagram, most likely due to differences in stellar rotation. Two barium stars have been identified in NGC 5822, making it only the second cluster shown to host these objects as of 2013.

== Gallery ==
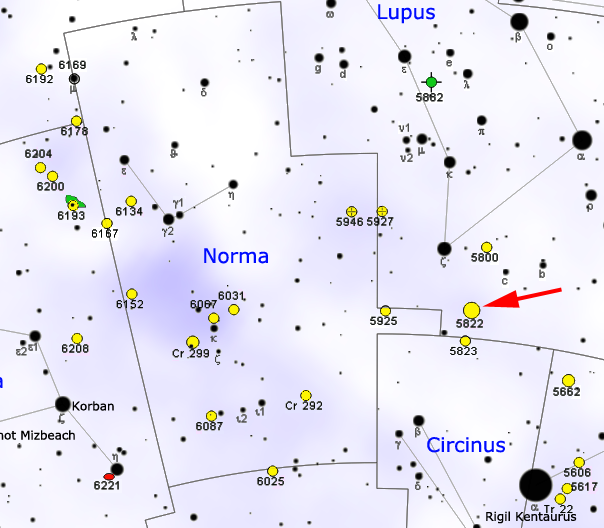
Map showing the location of NGC 5822
