= AX Circini =

Binary star system in the constellation Circinus

Observation data Epoch J2000 Equinox ICRS
- Constellation: Circinus
- Right ascension: 14^{h} 52^{m} 35.25324^{s}
- Declination: −63° 48′ 35.4172″
- Apparent magnitude (V): 5.91 (5.69–6.19)

Characteristics
- Spectral type: F8 II + B6 V
- U−B color index: +0.2
- B−V color index: +0.8
- Variable type: δ Cep

Astrometry
Radial velocity (R_{v})	−20.9±4.6 km/s
Proper motion (μ)	RA: −4.779 mas/yr Dec.: −5.108 mas/yr
Parallax (π)	1.7449±0.3450 mas
Distance	approx. 1,900 ly (approx. 600 pc)
Absolute magnitude (M_{V})	−3.37

Orbit
Period (P)	6,532±25 d
Eccentricity (e)	0.19±0.02
Longitude of the node (Ω)	231±8°
Periastron epoch (T)	2,448,500±60 JD
Semi-amplitude (K_{1}) (primary)	10.0±0.5 km/s

Details

AX Cir A
Mass	11.56 M_{☉}
Radius	45.68 R_{☉}
Luminosity	2,050 L_{☉}
Surface gravity (log g)	2.00 cgs
Temperature	5,443±21 K
Metallicity [Fe/H]	−0.05 dex
Rotational velocity (v sin i)	7.4±0.4 km/s

AX Cir B
Mass	5.57 M_{☉}

Other designations
- 26 G. Cir, AX Cir, CD−63° 1029, HD 130701/2, HIP 72773, HR 5527, SAO 252928, WDS J14526-6349AB

Database references
SIMBAD	data

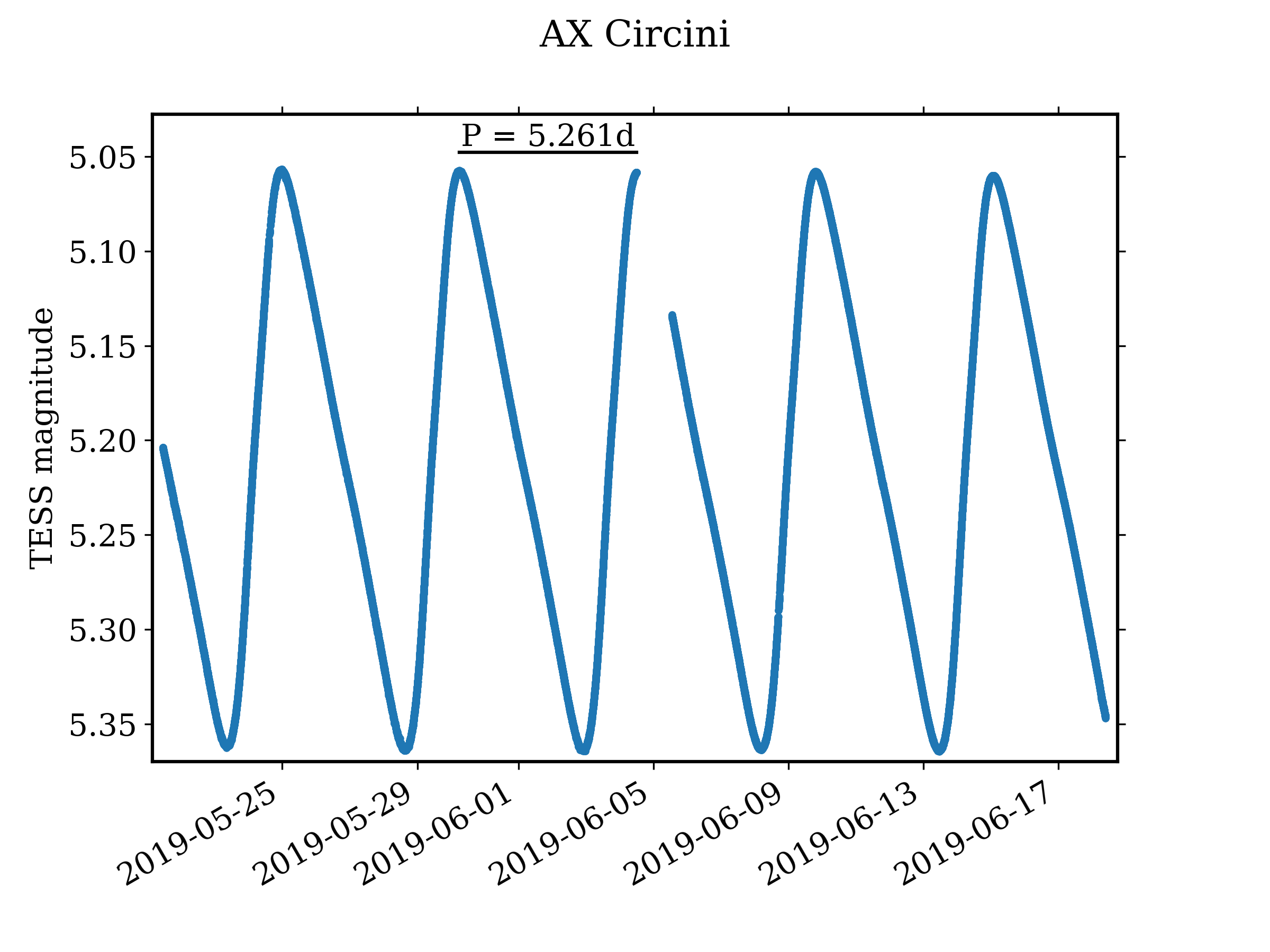
Light curve of AX Circini recorded by NASA's Transiting Exoplanet Survey Satellite (TESS)

AX Circini is a binary star system in the southern constellation of Circinus. It has a nominal magnitude of 5.91, which is bright enough to be visible to the naked eye. Based upon an annual parallax shift of 1.7 mas, it is located roughly 1,900 light-years from the Earth. The system is moving closer with a heliocentric radial velocity of −21 km/s.

This is a spectroscopic binary with an orbital period of 17.88 years and an eccentricity of 0.19. A binary companion was first suspected in 1960, as the spectrum was considered to be composite and there is an ultraviolet excess. The companion was confirmed in 1982, and it was resolved using long baseline interferometry in 2014 and 2015. The system has an a sin i value of 6.05 AU, where a is the semimajor axis and i is the (unknown) orbital inclination.

The primary, component A, is a yellow-white-hued bright giant with a stellar classification of F8 II, Walter Strohmeier discovered that it is a variable star, in 1964, but could not classify it initially. By 1966 he had classified it as a classical Cepheid variable. The combined apparent magnitude of the system ranges from 5.69 to 6.19 over 5.273 days. The secondary companion, component B, is a main-sequence star with a class of B6 V and an absolute magnitude of about −0.12.
