= Beta Circini =

Star in the constellation Circinus

β Circini
- Location of β Circini (circled)

Observation data Epoch J2000.0 Equinox ICRS
- Constellation: Circinus
- Right ascension: 15^{h} 17^{m} 30.84945^{s}
- Declination: −58° 48′ 04.3453″
- Apparent magnitude (V): 4.07

Characteristics
- Spectral type: A3 Va
- U−B color index: +0.09
- B−V color index: +0.088±0.007

Astrometry
Radial velocity (R_{v})	9.6±2 km/s
Proper motion (μ)	RA: −97.182 mas/yr Dec.: −136.055 mas/yr
Parallax (π)	35.8205±0.2515 mas
Distance	91.1 ± 0.6 ly (27.9 ± 0.2 pc)
Absolute magnitude (M_{V})	+1.64

Details
Mass	1.96+0.03 −0.01 M_{☉}
Radius	1.92 R_{☉}
Luminosity	19 L_{☉}
Surface gravity (log g)	4.281 cgs
Temperature	8676±33 K
Metallicity [Fe/H]	0.16 dex
Rotational velocity (v sin i)	59 km/s
Age	370–500 Myr

Other designations
- β Cir, Beta Circini, Beta Cir, CPD−58 5875, FK5 561, GC 20526, GJ 580.1,, GJ 9516, HD 135379, HIP 74824, HR 5670, SAO 242384, PPM 343590

Database references
SIMBAD	data

Beta Circini is the second-brightest star in the constellation of Circinus. Its name is a Bayer designation that is Latinized from β Circini, and abbreviated Beta Cir or β Cir. The star has an apparent visual magnitude of approximately 4.07, which is bright enough to be viewed with the naked eye. Based upon an annual parallax shift of 35.8 mas as seen from the Earth, it is located at a distance of 91.1 light-years (27.9 pc) from the Sun.

With a stellar classification of A3 Va, this is an A-type main-sequence star fusing atoms of hydrogen into helium at its core. It is between 370 and 500 million years old and is spinning with a projected rotational velocity of 59 km/s. The star has 1.96 times the mass of the Sun and around 1.9 times the Sun's radius. The star is radiating 19 times the Sun's luminosity from its photosphere at an effective temperature of 8,676 K. It has one known sub-stellar companion.

== Substellar companion ==
Beta Circini b is a distant brown dwarf companion orbiting the host star at a distance of 6,656 AU. It was detected as a proper motion companion to Beta Circini in 2015 by L.C. Smith and collaborators. Using BHAC15 isochrones, its mass is estimated at 0.056 M_{☉}, or 59 M_{J}. It has a stellar classification of L1 and a temperature of 2,084 K (1,811 °C).

The β Circini planetary system
Companion (in order from star)	Mass	Semimajor axis (AU)	Orbital period (days)	Eccentricity	Inclination (°)	Radius
b	58.7±7.3 M_{J}	6,656	—	—	—	—
