= NGC 5823 =

Open cluster in the constellation Circinus

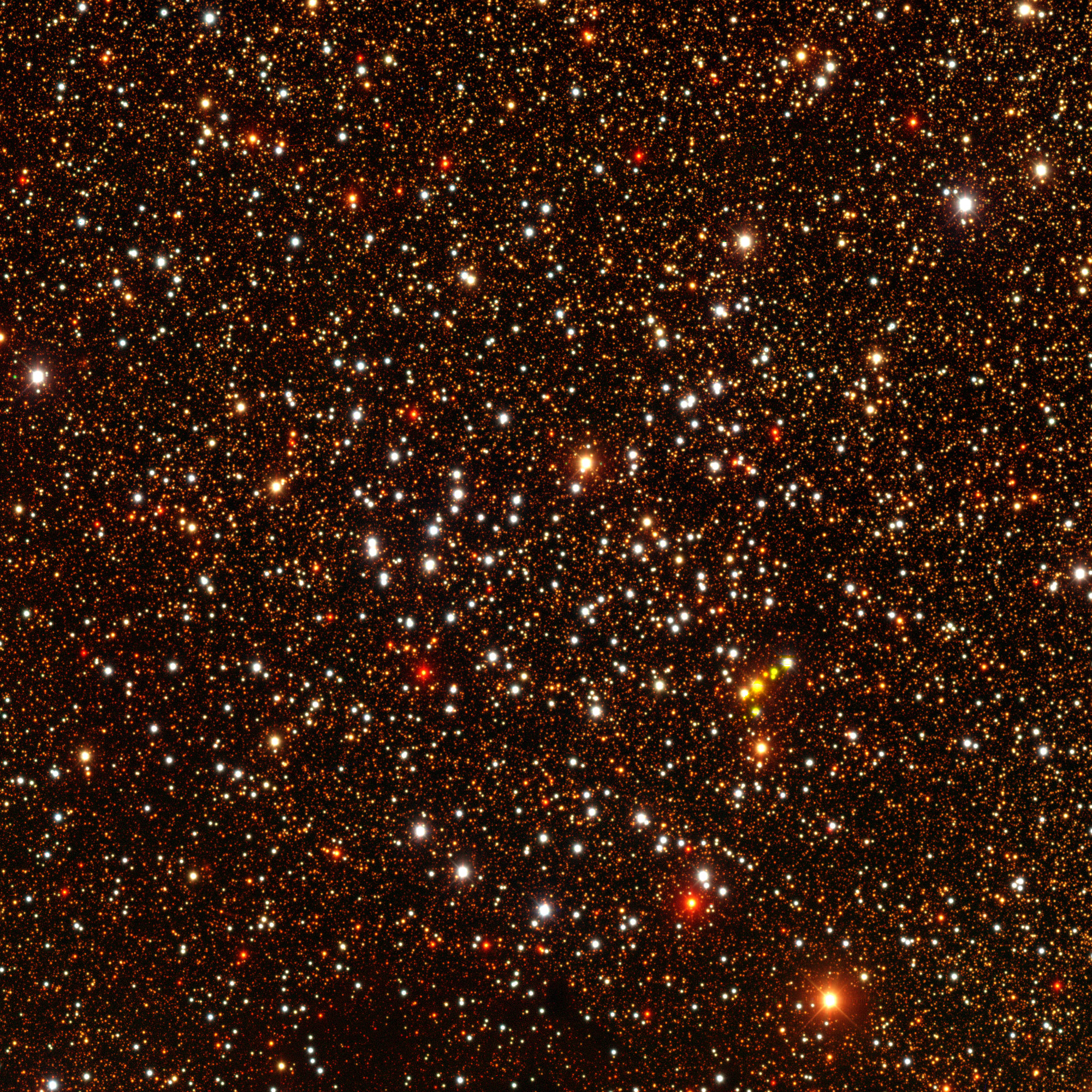
- NGC 5823; Credit: DECaPS

Observation data (J2000 epoch)
- Right ascension: 15^{h} 05^{m} 29.3^{s}
- Declination: −55° 36′ 28″
- Distance: 4,680 ± 130 ly (1,434 ± 40 pc)
- Apparent magnitude (V): 7.9

Physical characteristics
- Other designations: Caldwell 88, Cr 290

Associations
- Constellation: Circinus

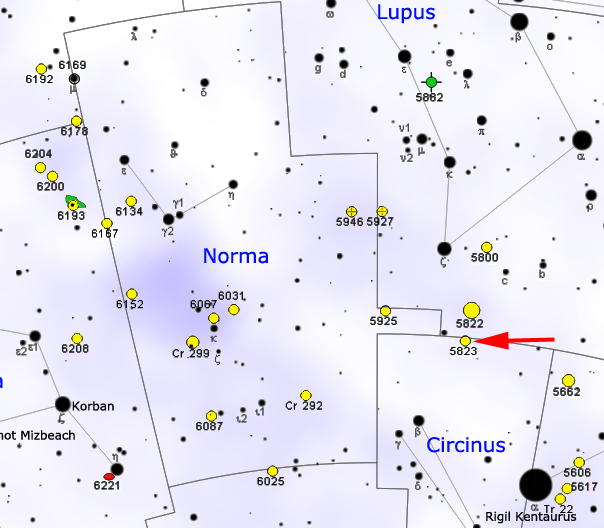
Map showing the location of NGC 5823

NGC 5823 (also known as Caldwell 88) is an open cluster in the southern constellation of Circinus, near (and extending across) its border with the constellation Lupus. It was discovered by Scottish astronomer James Dunlop in 1826.
