= Delta Circini =

Variable star in the constellation Circinus

- Location of δ Cir (circled)

Observation data Epoch J2000.0 Equinox ICRS
- Constellation: Circinus
- Right ascension: 15^{h} 16^{m} 56.89591^{s}
- Declination: −60° 57′ 26.1201″
- Apparent magnitude (V): 5.09 (5.05 - 5.20)

Characteristics
- Spectral type: O7.5III(f) (O8IV + O9.5V + B0.5V)
- U−B color index: −0.88
- B−V color index: −0.06
- Variable type: Eclipsing and ellipsoidal

Astrometry
Radial velocity (R_{v})	−17.80 km/s
Proper motion (μ)	RA: −4.085 mas/yr Dec.: −3.758 mas/yr
Parallax (π)	1.4345±0.1231 mas
Distance	2,641.5 ± 5.9 ly (809.9±1.8 pc)

Orbit
Primary	Aa
Name	Ab
Period (P)	3.90244719(52) days
Semi-major axis (a)	34.56±0.01 R_{☉} (Note: Calculated from a sin i/sin(i). The same calculation is used for the uncertainty, although the value does not change significantly.)
Eccentricity (e)	0.06116±0.00010
Inclination (i)	78.7745±0.0088°
Periastron epoch (T)	58,650.055430±0.00010 RJD
Argument of periastron (ω) (secondary)	344.83±0.37°
Semi-amplitude (K_{1}) (primary)	156.8 km/s
Semi-amplitude (K_{2}) (secondary)	280.4 km/s

Orbit
Primary	Aab
Name	Ac
Period (P)	1,603.24±0.19 days
Semi-major axis (a)	10.065±0.018 au
Eccentricity (e)	0.5291±0.0011
Inclination (i)	78.216±0.030°
Longitude of the node (Ω)	256.87±0.07°
Argument of periastron (ω) (secondary)	300.43±0.08°
Semi-amplitude (K_{1}) (primary)	24.37±0.10 km/s
Semi-amplitude (K_{2}) (secondary)	54.42±0.08 km/s

Details

Aa
Mass	23.358±0.030 M_{☉}
Radius	9.647±0.013 R_{☉}
Luminosity	153,000+27,000 −23,000 L_{☉}
Surface gravity (log g)	3.8375±0.0013 cgs
Temperature	33,750±300 K
Rotational velocity (v sin i)	117±5 km/s
Age	4.4±0.1 Myr

Ab
Mass	12.997±0.019 M_{☉}
Radius	5.3997±0.0076 R_{☉}
Luminosity	21,827+5,026 −4,085 L_{☉}
Surface gravity (log g)	4.0871±0.0015 cgs
Temperature	27,500±1,000 K
Rotational velocity (v sin i)	96±10 km/s
Age	4.7±0.2 Myr

Ac
Mass	16.41±0.12 M_{☉}
Radius	5.79+0.46 −0.42 R_{☉}
Luminosity	17,000 L_{☉}
Surface gravity (log g)	4.09±0.06 cgs
Temperature	29,000±2,000 K
Age	3.8±1.3 Myr

Other designations
- δ Cir, CD−60°5539, HD 135240, HIP 74778, HR 5664, SAO 253084, WDS J15169-6057

Database references
SIMBAD	data

Delta Circini is a multiple star system located in the constellation Circinus. Its name is a Bayer designation that is Latinized from δ Circinus, and abbreviated Delta Cir or δ Cir; Delta Circini is also known as HR 5664, and HD 135240. The system has a combined apparent visual magnitude of +5.09, and is located at a distance of about 700 pc (2,300ly) from the Sun.

== Companions ==
δ Circini A is a spectroscopic triple star. The two inner components form an eclipsing binary system. The outer component has been resolved using the VLTI PIONIER instrument.

δ Circini B is a 13th magnitude companion nearly an arc-second away. It is unclear whether the two are physically associated and little is known about the fainter star although it has been reported to be a G5 main sequence star or giant.

HD 135160 is a 6th magnitude binary Be star that shares a common space motion with δ Circini and is only 4 arc minutes away. The two make a faint naked eye pair.

== System properties ==
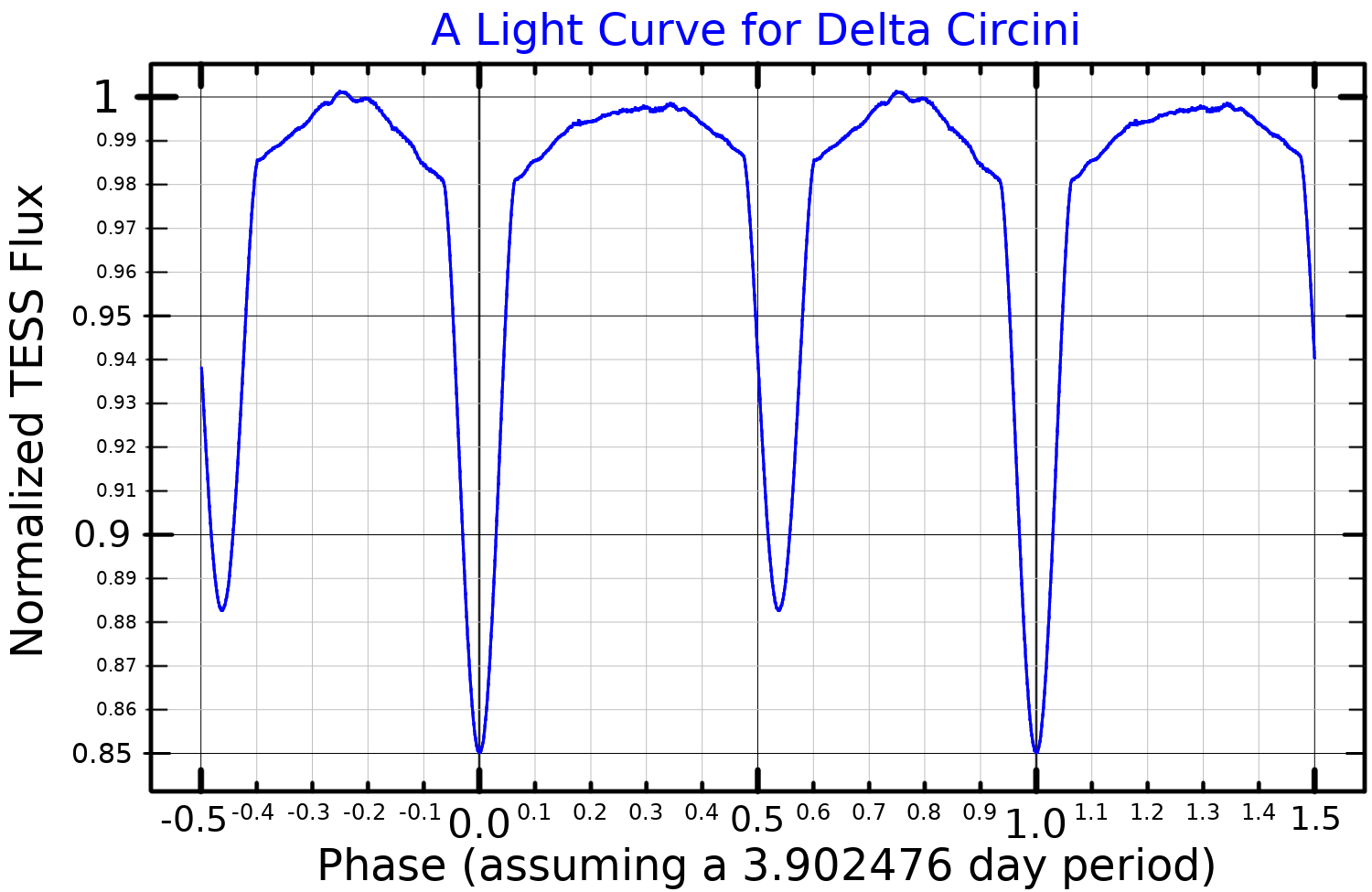
A light curve for Delta Circini, plotted from TESS data

All three components of δ Circini A are hot luminous stars. The brightest is an O8 star just beginning to evolve away from the main sequence. It is in a very close orbit with an O9.5 main sequence star. The two stars are deformed into ellipsoidal shapes and eclipse each other every 3.9 days. The total brightness change is only 0.15 magnitudes.

The inner system is predicted to merge within 1.7 million years, resulting in a 36.4-solar mass star that will eventually undergo a supernova and become a black hole.

The third component is a B0.5 main sequence star in a long eccentric orbit around the close pair. It is fainter and cooler than either of the two close stars.
