= BX Circini =

Star in the constellation Circinus

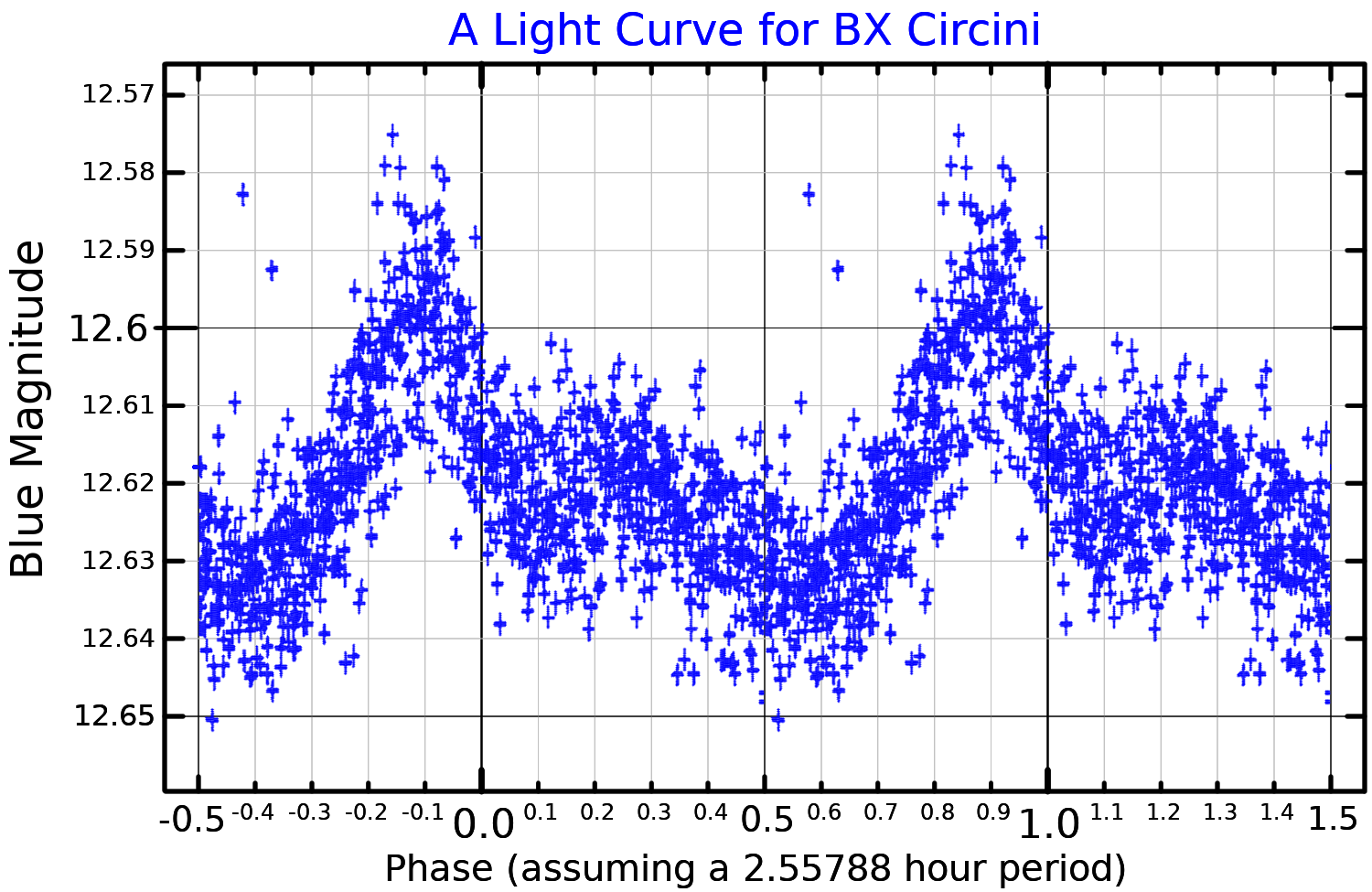
- A blue band light curve for BX Circini, adapted from Kilkenny et al. (1999)

Observation data Epoch J2000 Equinox ICRS
- Constellation: Circinus
- Right ascension: 14^{h} 01^{m} 36.468^{s}
- Declination: −66° 09′ 56.30″
- Apparent magnitude (V): 12.58

Characteristics
- Spectral type: OB+
- Variable type: PV Telescopii variable

Astrometry
| Proper motion (μ) | RA: −8.293 mas/yr Dec.: 2.215 mas/yr |
| Parallax (π) | 0.2695±0.0373 mas |
| Distance | approx. 12,000 ly (approx. 3,700 pc) |

Details
| Mass | 0.42 ± 0.12 M_{☉} |
| Radius | 2.31 ± 0.10 R_{☉} |
| Surface gravity (log g) | 3.35 ± 0.1 cgs |

Other designations
- LS 3184, TYC 9017-1207-1, 2MASS J14013647-6609560

Database references
| SIMBAD | data |

BX Circini is a star in the constellation Circinus. Its variability was discovered in 1995, with its apparent magnitude ranging from 12.57 to 12.62 over a period of 2 hours 33 minutes. It is currently classified as a PV Telescopii variable star, but has been put forward as the prototype of a new class of pulsating star—the BX Circini variables—along with the only other known example, V652 Herculis. This class of star is rare, possibly because this is a brief stage of stellar evolution. Its mass has been calculated to be around 40 percent that of the Sun, but the radius is a few times larger than that of the Sun. The average surface temperature is high, and has been measured at 23,390 ± 90 K using optical spectra, but 1750 K cooler if analysing it in both the visual and ultraviolet. The temperature appears to vary by 3450 K.

This star has an extremely low proportion of hydrogen, which was first noticed in 1980. In fact, over 99% of its composition appears to be helium, qualifying it as an extreme helium star. Its origin is unclear, but thought to be a result of the merger of a helium white dwarf with a carbon/oxygen one. The two merge violently, with material from the lighter helium white dwarf forming the outer envelope. The resulting star expands and shines as a yellow giant, its outer helium shell igniting and undergoing fusion as material continues to be accreted from the lighter star. The size of the star is maintained by the weight upon the helium shell, and once that has become light enough and the helium is exhausted, the star begins heating and shrinking, becoming the smaller blue star now observed.
