= Zeta Circini =

Star in the constellation Circinus

ζ Circini
Observation data Epoch J2000.0 Equinox J2000.0 (ICRS)
- Constellation: Circinus
- Right ascension: 14^{h} 54^{m} 42.586^{s}
- Declination: −65° 59′ 27.978″
- Apparent magnitude (V): 6.08

Characteristics
- Spectral type: B2/3 Vn
- U−B color index: −0.617
- B−V color index: −0.073
- Variable type: SPB

Astrometry
Radial velocity (R_{v})	−18.0±4.3 km/s
Proper motion (μ)	RA: −9.071 mas/yr Dec.: −8.227 mas/yr
Parallax (π)	2.3291±0.0529 mas
Distance	1,400 ± 30 ly (429 ± 10 pc)
Absolute magnitude (M_{V})	−1.82

Details
Mass	5.5±1.0 M_{☉}
Radius	3.8±1.3 R_{☉}
Luminosity	602 L_{☉}
Surface gravity (log g)	4.03±0.20 cgs
Temperature	16,788 K
Rotational velocity (v sin i)	264±8 km/s
Age	31.6±5.7 Myr

Other designations
- ζ Cir, CD−65°1813, HD 131058, HIP 72965, HR 5539, SAO 252951

Database references
SIMBAD	data

Zeta Circini is a star located in the southern constellation of Circinus. Its name is a Bayer designation that is Latinized from ζ Circini, and abbreviated Zeta Cir or ζ Cir. With an apparent visual magnitude of 6.08, it is barely visible to the naked eye on a dark night. (According to the Bortle scale, it requires the lighting level of suburban skies or darker to be seen.) The distance to this star, as estimated using an annual parallax shift of 2.33 mas, is around 1,400 light years. It is drifting closer to the Sun with a line of sight velocity component of around −18 km/s.

This is a B-type main sequence star with a stellar classification of B2/3 Vn, where the 'n' suffix indicates broad ("nebulous") absorption lines due to rotation. It is a slowly pulsating B star with a frequency of 0.26877 d^{−1} and an amplitude of 0.0046 magnitude. The averaged quadratic field strength of the star's longitudinal magnetic field is (1.06±0.46)×10^{−2} T.

The star is around 32 million years old and is spinning rapidly with a projected rotational velocity of 264 km/s. It has an estimated 5.5 times the mass of the Sun and 3.8 times the Sun's radius. Zeta Circini radiates around 602 times the solar luminosity from its outer atmosphere at an effective temperature of 16,788 K.
