= Gamma Circini =

Variable star in the constellation Circinus

γ Circini
- Location of y Circini (circled)

Observation data Epoch J2000.0 Equinox J2000.0 (ICRS)
- Constellation: Circinus
- Right ascension: 15^{h} 23^{m} 22.64294^{s}
- Declination: −59° 19′ 14.8131″
- Apparent magnitude (V): 4.51 (4.94 + 5.73)

Characteristics
- Spectral type: B5 IV + F8 V
- Variable type: Be

Astrometry
Radial velocity (R_{v})	16.90±1.78 km/s
Proper motion (μ)	RA: −12.97 mas/yr Dec.: −34.24 mas/yr
Parallax (π)	7.27±0.81 mas
Distance	approx. 450 ly (approx. 140 pc)
Absolute magnitude (M_{V})	−1.18

Orbit
Period (P)	258 yr
Semi-major axis (a)	2.576″
Eccentricity (e)	0.931

Details

γ Cir A
Mass	6.0±0.3 M_{☉}
Temperature	15,135 K
Age	63.1±19.6 Myr

γ Cir B
Temperature	4,786 K

Other designations
- γ Cir, CPD−58°5908, HIP 75323, HR 5704, SAO 242463
- γ Cir A: HD 136415
- γ Cir B: HD 136416

Database references
SIMBAD	γ Cir AB
- γ Cir A
- γ Cir B

Gamma Circini is a star system in the constellation Circinus. Its name is a Bayer designation that is Latinized from γ Circini, and abbreviated Gamma Cir or γ Cir. This was noted as a double star by Herschel in 1835, who estimated the separation as 1 arc second. It is visible to the naked eye as a point of light with a combined apparent visual magnitude of 4.51. Based upon an annual parallax shift of 7.27 mas, it is about 450 light-years away.

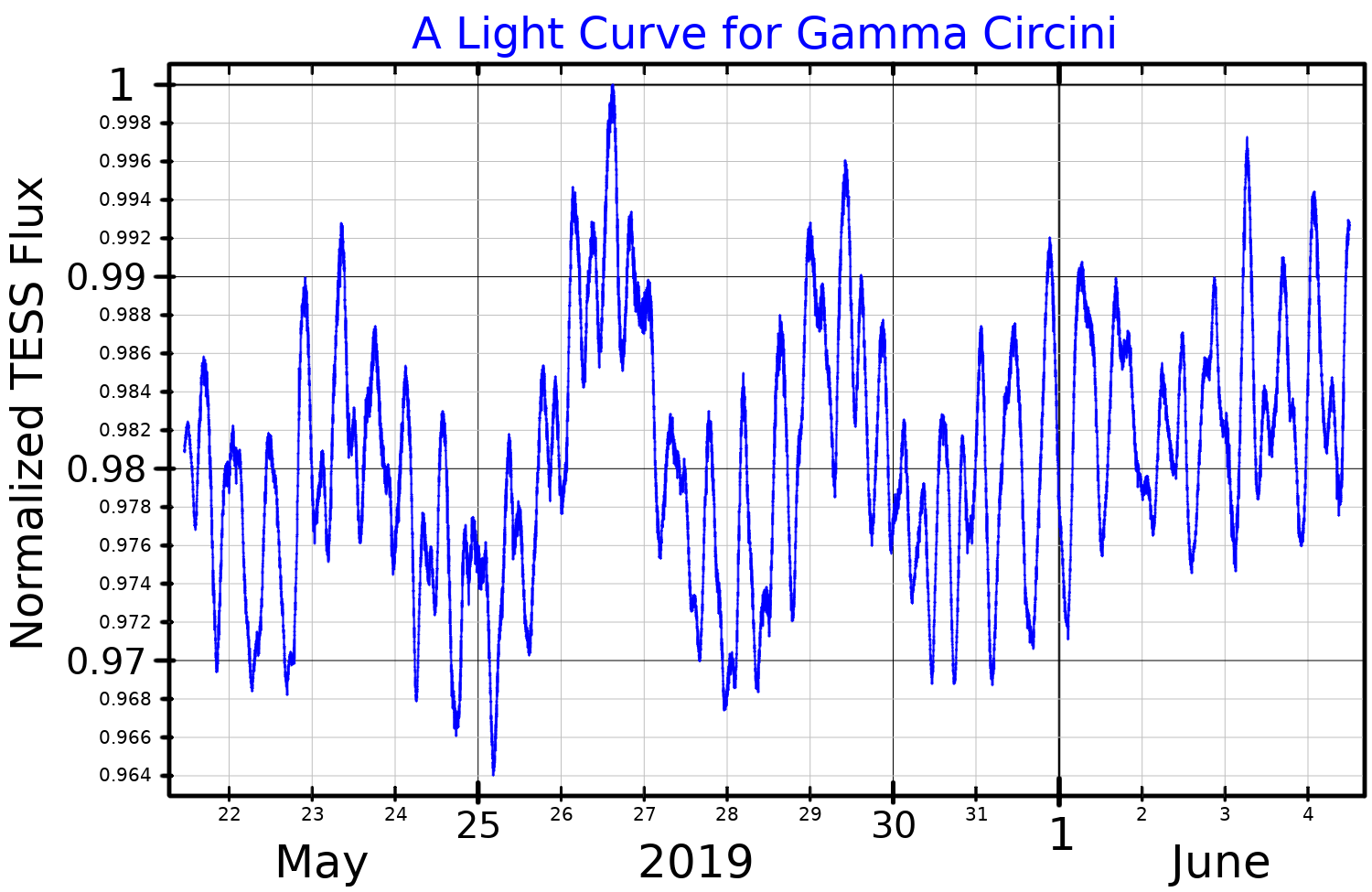
A light curve for Gamma Circini, plotted from TESS data

This is a wide binary star system and may even be a triple star. The two visible components orbit each other with a preliminary estimated period of 258 years and a large eccentricity of 0.931. As of 2014, the visible components have an angular separation of 0.80 arc seconds on a position angle of 359°.

The primary star, component A, is a B-type subgiant star with a stellar classification of B5 IV. Based upon isochrone curve fitting it is hypothesized to be a pair of matching B5 stars, and is a Be variable with an uncertain maximum. It has an effective temperature of 15,135 K and an estimated mass six times that of the Sun. The companion, component B, is an F-type main-sequence star with a stellar classification of F8 V. It has an effective temperature of 4,786 K.
