= Circinus X-1 =

Binary star in the constellation Circinus

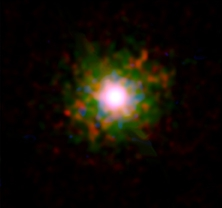
- X-ray image of Circinus X-1; Credit: Chandra X-ray Observatory

Observation data Epoch J2000 Equinox ICRS
- Constellation: Circinus
- Right ascension: 15^{h} 20^{m} 40.85^{s}
- Declination: −57° 10′ 00.1″
- Apparent magnitude (V): 21.40

Characteristics
- Spectral type: B5–A0 I
- Variable type: HMXB

Astrometry
Distance	31000+2600 −3300 ly (9400+800 −1000 pc)

Orbit
Period (P)	16.68 ± 0.15 d
Eccentricity (e)	0.45 ± 0.07
Periastron epoch (T)	JD 2453473.8 ± 0.4
Argument of periastron (ω) (secondary)	2 ± 12°
Semi-amplitude (K_{1}) (primary)	25 ± 2 km/s

Other designations
- INTREF 645, 2U 1516-56, BR Cir, 2MASS J15204084-5710001

Database references
SIMBAD	data

Circinus X-1 is an X-ray binary star system that includes a neutron star. Observation of Circinus X-1 in July 2007 revealed the presence of X-ray jets normally found in black hole systems; it is the first of the sort to be discovered that displays this similarity to black holes. Circinus X-1 may be among the youngest X-ray binaries observed.

== Location, distance ==
On June 14, 1969, an Aerobee 150 rocket, launched from Natal, Rio Grande do Norte, Brazil, obtained X-ray data during a scan of the Norma-Lupus-Circinus region that detected a well-isolated source at ℓ = 321.4±0.9° b = -0.5±2° (galactic), RA 15^{h} 14^{m} Dec −57° 49′ within the constellation Circinus and referred to as Circinus XR-1 (Cir XR-1). The distance of Circinus X-1 was not well established, with a low estimate of 13,400 light years and high estimate of 26,000 light years.

On June 23, 2015, an article published on NASA's Chandra X-Ray Observatory's website, revealed that an international team of astronomers has succeeded in determining its distance from Earth with more precision - via a method of triangulation of X-ray light emitted by the star, echoing through stellar clouds and interstellar dust - as being about 30,700 light-years.

== X-ray source and age related to supernova remnant ==
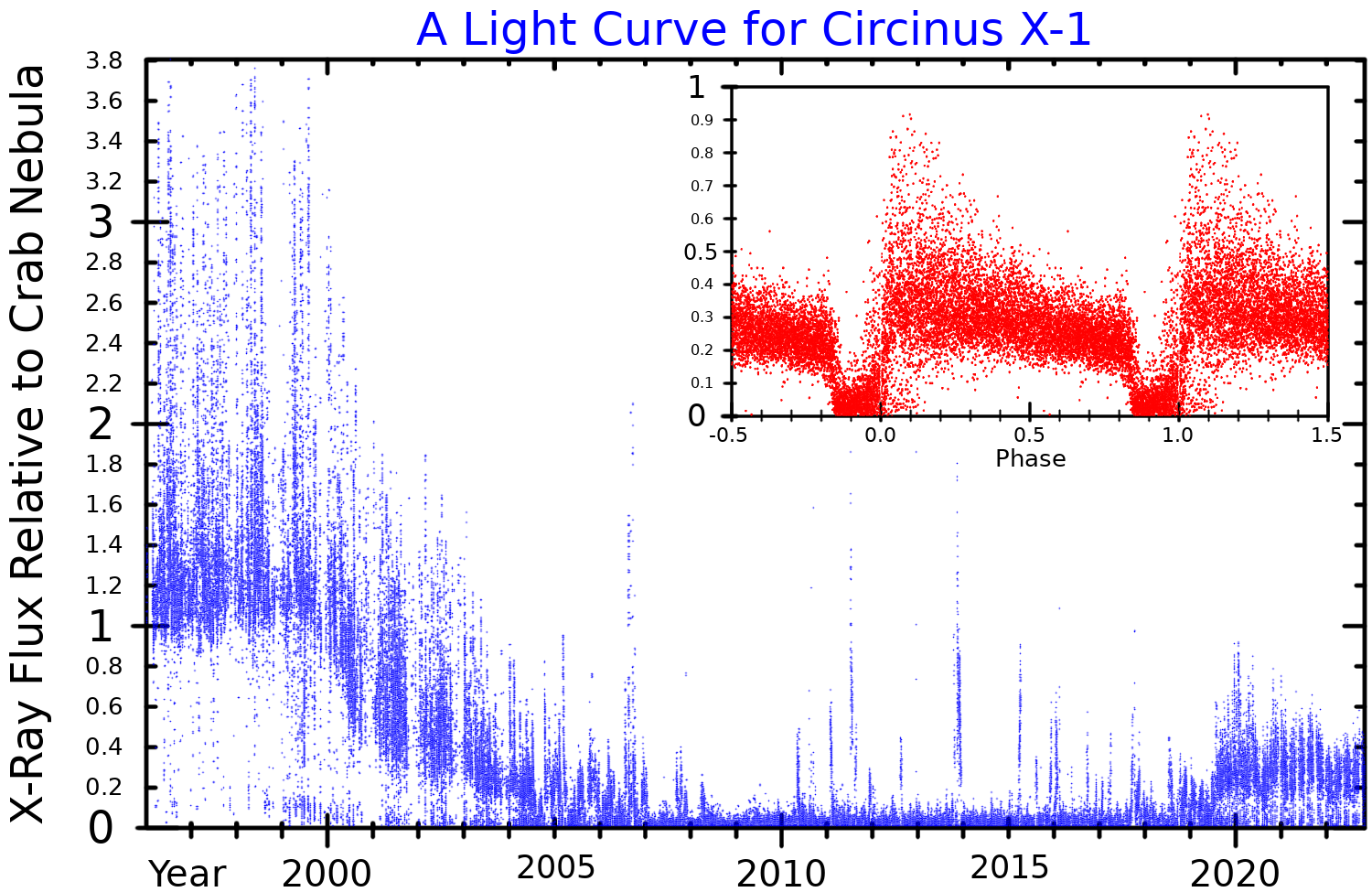
X-ray light curves for Circinus X-1. The main plot shows the long term variability, and the inset plot shows the short term variability with a period of approximately 16.6 days. Adapted from Yu et al. (2024)

A 16.6 day X-ray period was found by Kaluzienski et al. The X-ray source is assumed to be a neutron star as part of a low-mass X-ray binary (LMXB), type-I X-ray burster. The X-ray and radio nebulae surrounding Circinus X-1 have properties consistent with a young supernova remnant. This rare case of an X-ray binary apparently associated with a supernova remnant suggests the binary is very young on cosmic time scales, possibly less than 4600 years old. An association of Circinus X-1 with a different nearby supernova remnant, G321.9-0.3, has been ruled out.

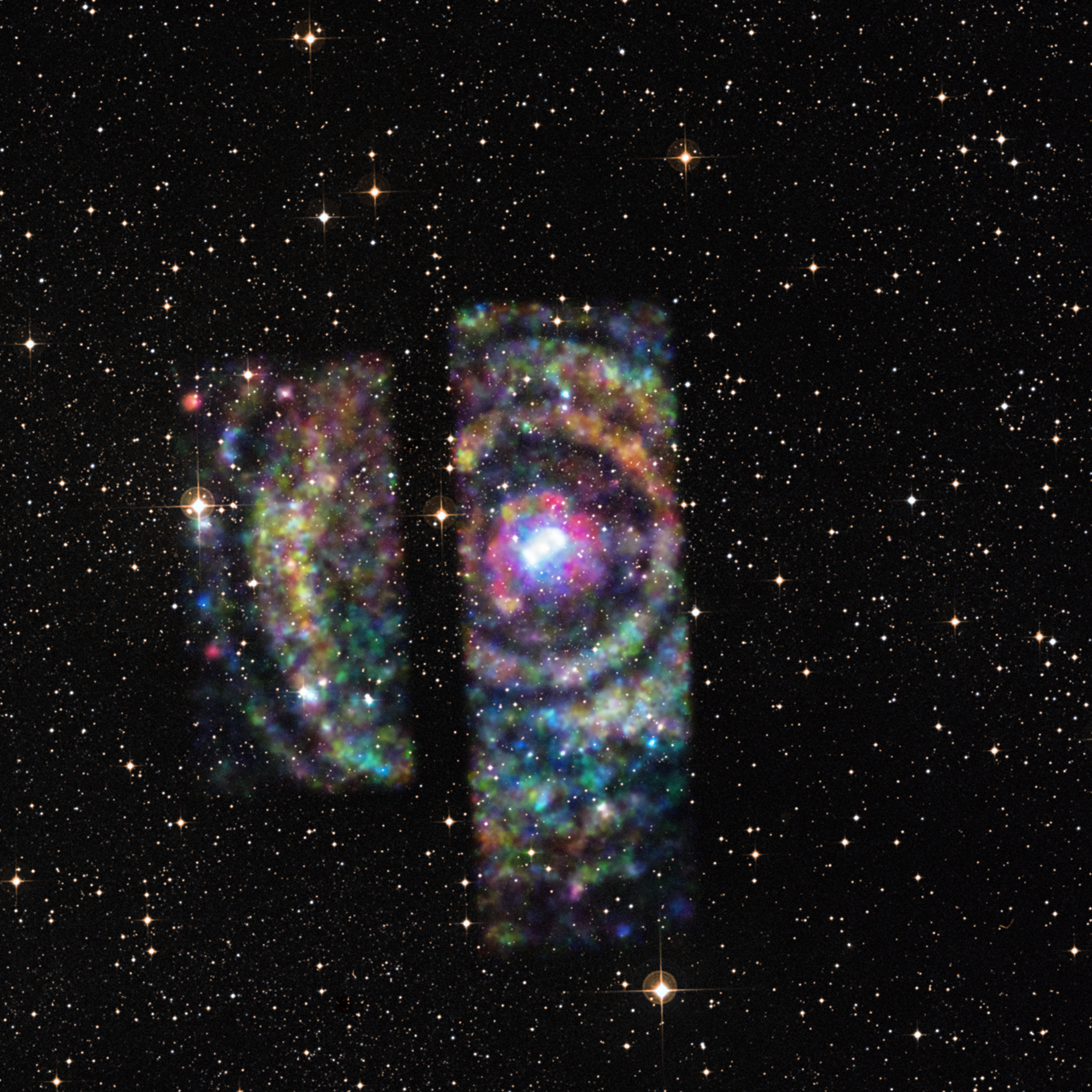
X-ray light rings from a neutron star in Circinus X-1 (24 June 2015; Chandra X-ray Observatory).

== Other spectral regions ==
The binary nature of Cir X-1 has been established. The binary's radio component and a possible visual counterpart were identified by Whelan et al. Its infrared counterpart was located and found to flare with a 16.6-day period by Glass. A (heavily reddened) precise optical counterpart (now known as BR Cir) was identified by Moneti.
