= Circinus Galaxy =

Galaxy in the constellation Circinus

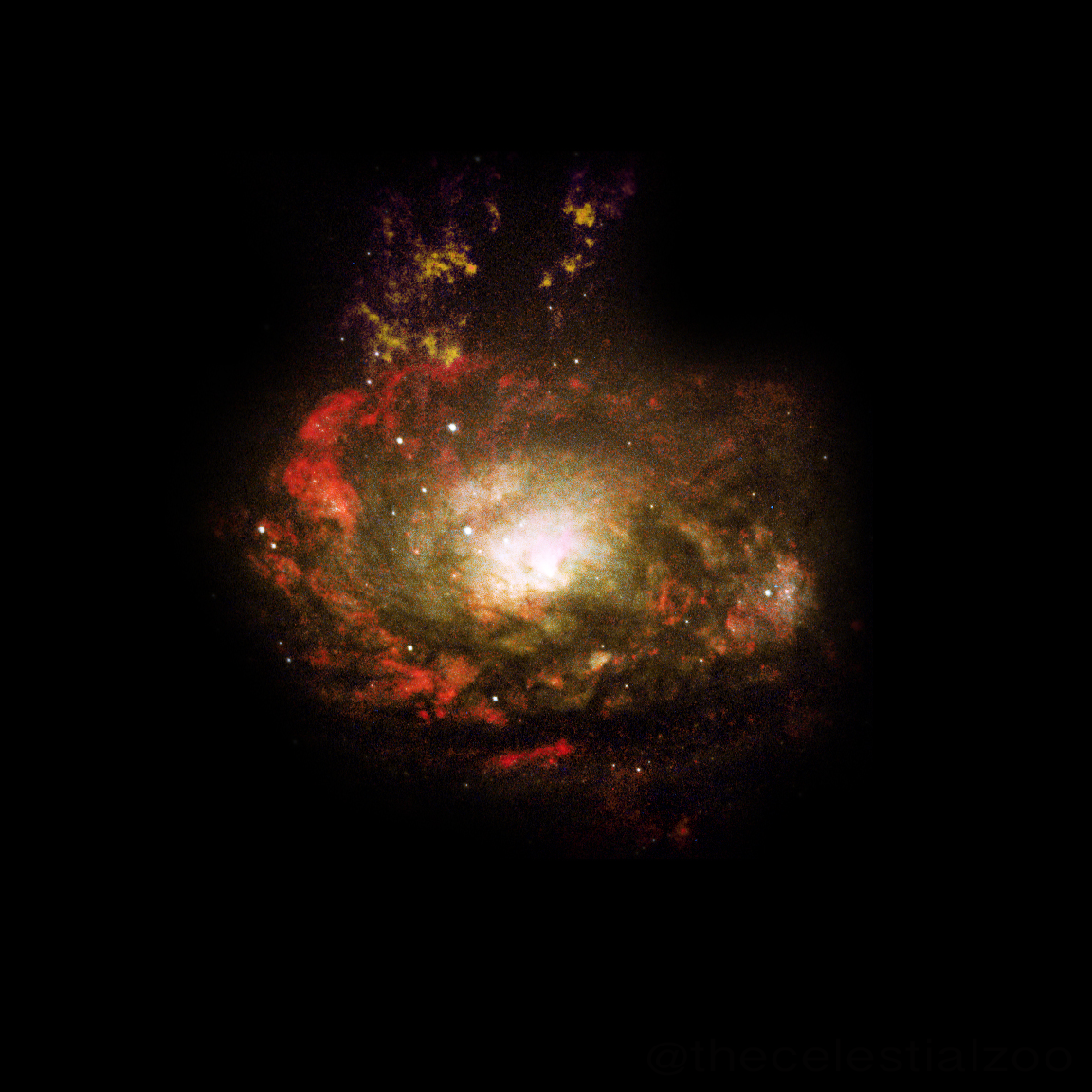
- A Hubble Space Telescope (HST) image of the core of the Circinus Galaxy.

Observation data (J2000 epoch)
- Constellation: Circinus
- Right ascension: 14^{h} 13^{m} 09.9643^{s}
- Declination: −65° 20′ 20.731″
- Redshift: 426 ± 25 km/s
- Apparent magnitude (V): 12.1

Characteristics
- Type: SA(s)b
- Size: 14.85 kpc × 6.09 kpc (48,430 ly × 19,860 ly) (diameter; 2MASS K-band total isophote) (Note: The quoted diameters in this infobox was based on NED's provided scale of 15 pc/arcsec multiplied with the given angular diameters.); 10.38 kpc × 5.19 kpc (33,855 ly × 16,928 ly) (diameter; ESO 90% total B-band)
- Apparent size (V): 6.9′ × 3.0′

Other designations
- ESO 097- G 013, IRAS 14092-6506, 2MASX J14130990-6520204, LEDA 50779, PGC 50779

The Circinus Galaxy (also known as ESO 97-G13) is a Seyfert galaxy in the constellation of Circinus. It is located 4 degrees below the Galactic plane, and, at a distance of 4.0 Mpc (13 Mly), is one of the closest major galaxies to the Milky Way. The galaxy is undergoing tumultuous changes, as rings of gas are likely being ejected from the galaxy. Its outermost ring is 1400 light-years across while the inner ring is 260 light-years across. Although the Circinus galaxy can be seen using a small telescope, it was not noticed until 1977 because it lies close to the plane of the Milky Way and is obscured by galactic dust. The Circinus Galaxy is a Type II Seyfert galaxy and is one of the closest known active galaxies to the Milky Way, though it is probably slightly farther away than Centaurus A.

The Circinus Galaxy is one of twelve large galaxies in the "Council of Giants" surrounding the Local Group in the Local Sheet. One object is possibly a satellite of the Circinus Galaxy, known as HIZOA J1353-58. HIZOA J1353-58 was discovered in a survey of neutral hydrogen (H I) and is located within the Zone of Avoidance.

NuSTAR detected a ULX at the edge of this galaxy, a black hole about 100 times the mass of the Sun.

== Supernova ==
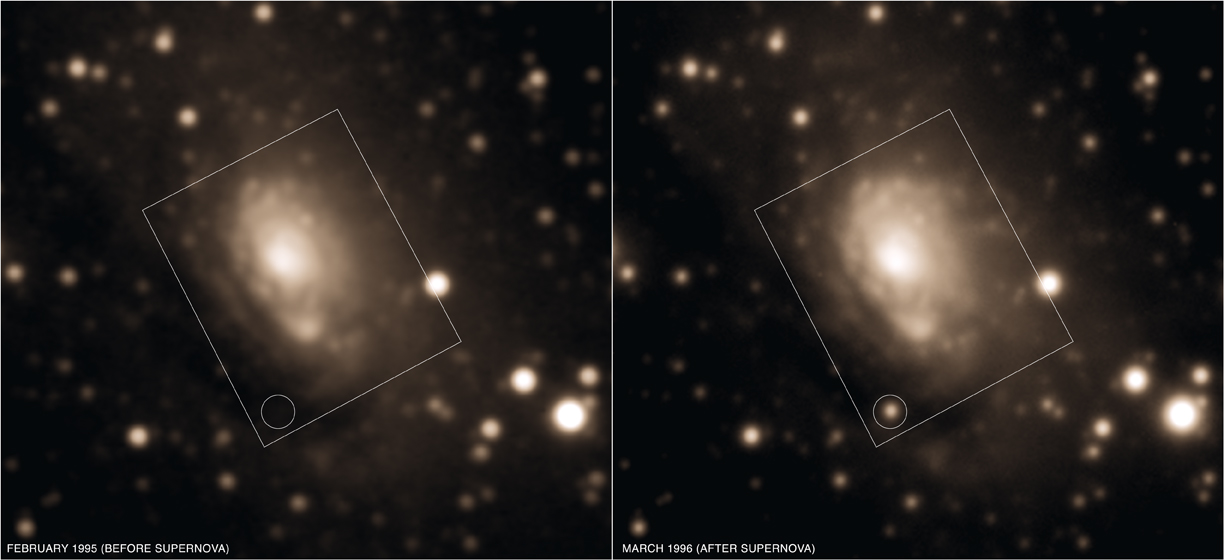
Circinus galaxy before and after SN 1996cr appeared

Circinus Galaxy produced supernova SN 1996cr (Type IIn, mag. 15.8), which was identified over a decade after it exploded. This supernova event was first observed during 2001 as a bright, variable object in a Chandra X-ray Observatory image, but it was not confirmed as a supernova until years later.

== Image gallery ==
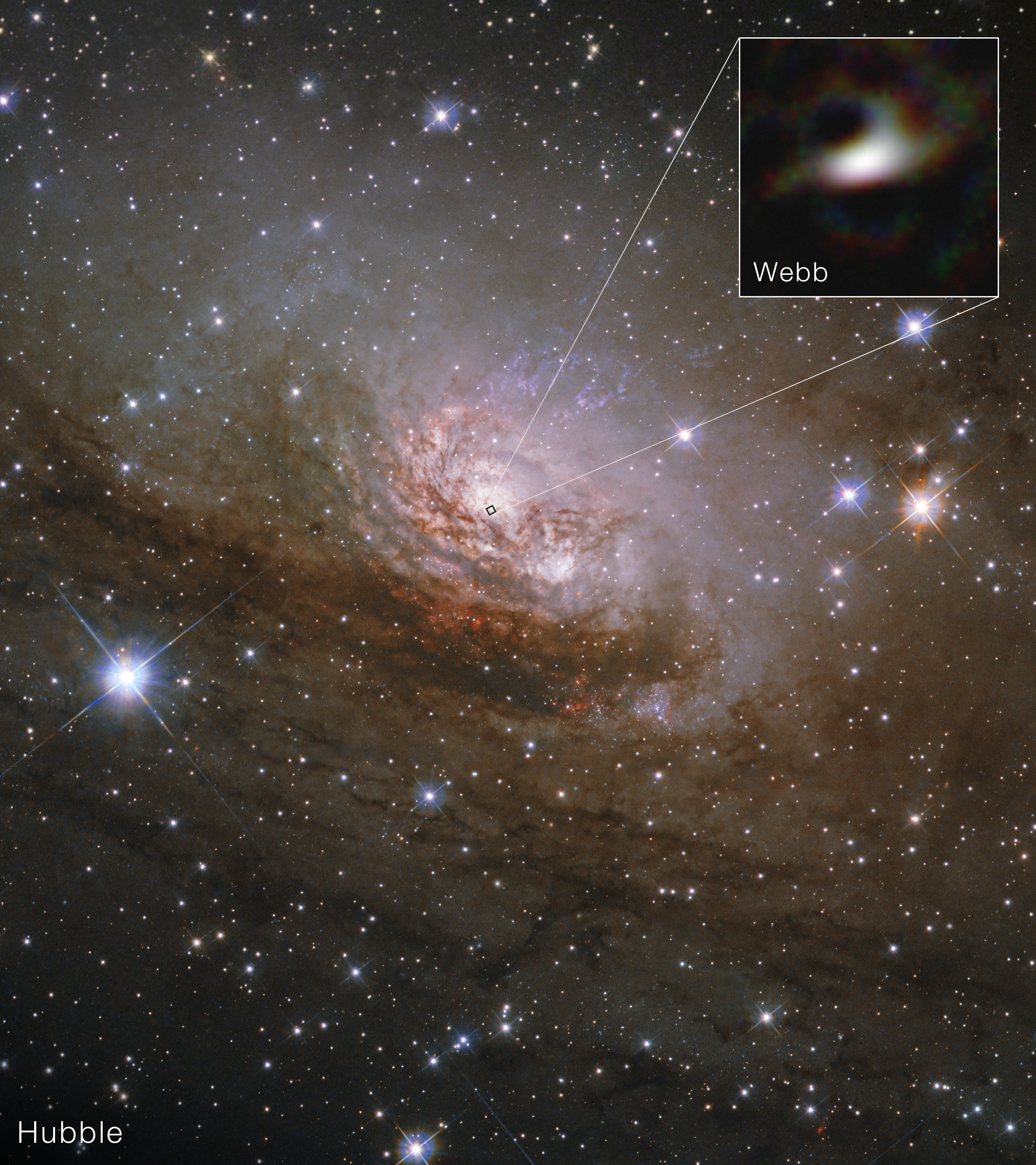
The Circinus Galaxy imaged by the Hubble Space Telescope, showing its central black hole imaged by the James Webb Space Telescope
