= Eta Circini =

Star in the constellation Circinus

η Circini
Observation data Epoch J2000.0 Equinox J2000.0 (ICRS)
- Constellation: Circinus
- Right ascension: 15^{h} 04^{m} 48.18757^{s}
- Declination: −64° 01′ 52.8641″
- Apparent magnitude (V): 5.17

Characteristics
- Evolutionary stage: red giant branch
- Spectral type: G8 III
- B−V color index: +0.93

Astrometry
Radial velocity (R_{v})	44.8±0.8 km/s
Proper motion (μ)	RA: +103.058 mas/yr Dec.: +8.499 mas/yr
Parallax (π)	11.7561±0.0661 mas
Distance	277 ± 2 ly (85.1 ± 0.5 pc)
Absolute magnitude (M_{V})	+0.52

Details
Mass	2.90±0.04 M_{☉}
Radius	10.68±0.22 R_{☉}
Luminosity	78.0±0.8 L_{☉}
Surface gravity (log g)	2.7022^{+0.01}_{−0.05} cgs
Temperature	5,250±4 K
Metallicity [Fe/H]	−0.37±0.02 dex
Age	414±41 Myr

Other designations
- η Cir, CPD−63°3493, HD 132905, HIP 73776, HR 5593, SAO 253005

Database references
SIMBAD	data

Eta Circini is a solitary star located in the southern constellation of Circinus. Its name is a Bayer designation that is Latinized from η Circini, and abbreviated Eta Cir or η Cir. This star is faintly visible to the naked eye with an apparent visual magnitude of 5.17. The distance to this star, as determined from an annual parallax shift of 11.8 mas, is around 277 light years. The star is drifting further away from the Sun with a line of sight velocity component of 45 km/s.

This is an evolved G-type giant star with a stellar classification of G8 III. It is 414 million years old with 2.9 times the mass of the Sun and 10.7 times the Sun's radius. The star is radiating 78 times the solar luminosity from its enlarged photosphere at an effective temperature of 5,250 K.
