= HD 134060 =

Star in the constellation Circinus

Observation data Epoch J2000 Equinox ICRS
- Constellation: Circinus
- Right ascension: 15^{h} 10^{m} 44.74301^{s}
- Declination: −61° 25′ 20.3607″
- Apparent magnitude (V): 6.29±0.01

Characteristics
- Evolutionary stage: main sequence or subgiant
- Spectral type: G0 V Fe+0.4 or G3 IV
- B−V color index: 0.623±0.003

Astrometry
Radial velocity (R_{v})	43.50±0.74 km/s
Proper motion (μ)	RA: −185.606 mas/yr Dec.: −12.142 mas/yr
Parallax (π)	41.6198±0.0202 mas
Distance	78.37 ± 0.04 ly (24.03 ± 0.01 pc)
Absolute magnitude (M_{V})	4.37

Details
Mass	1.07±0.07 M_{☉}
Radius	1.15±0.02 R_{☉}
Luminosity	1.63 L_{☉}
Surface gravity (log g)	4.35±0.04 cgs
Temperature	5,965±50 K
Metallicity [Fe/H]	+0.14±0.01 dex
Rotation	21.2±1.1 d
Rotational velocity (v sin i)	3.21 km/s
Age	1.75 Gyr

Other designations
- 38 G. Circini, CD−60°5490, HD 134060, HIP 74273, HR 5632, SAO 253043, LTT 6035

Database references
SIMBAD	data

HD 134060, also known by its Gould designation of 38 G. Circini, is a star in the southern constellation of Circinus. It is near the lower limit of stars visible to the naked eye, having an apparent visual magnitude of 6.29. The distance to HD 134060, as determined using an annual parallax shift measurement of 41.6 mas, is 78.4 light years. It is moving further away with a heliocentric radial velocity of 43.5 km/s, having come within 34.6 ly some 439,000 years ago.

During the NStars project, Grey et al. (2006) found a stellar classification of G0 V Fe+0.4 for this star, matching a Sun-like G-type main-sequence star with an overabundance of iron in its outer atmosphere. However, an older classification of G3 IV is still used, which would suggest it is instead a more evolved subgiant star. HD 134060 has an estimated 1.07 times the mass of the Sun and 1.15 times the Sun's radius. It is radiating 1.63 times the Sun's luminosity from its photosphere at an effective temperature of about 5,965 K.

The survey in 2015 have ruled out the existence of any additional stellar companions at projected distances from 22 to 163 astronomical units.

== Planetary system ==
Based upon an 8-year survey using the HARPS spectrograph at La Silla Observatory, in 2011 the detection of a pair of planets orbiting this star were announced. The inner planet, HD 134060 b, is in a tight, eccentric orbit around the star with a period of just over three days. The second object, HD 134060 c, has a more leisurely period of around 3.2 years and a high orbital eccentricity.

The star was observed for a few hours by the Spitzer Space Telescope in the hopes of observing a transit by the inner planet, but none was detected. HD 134060 displays an infrared excess at a wavelength of 18μm, making it a warm debris disk candidate.

The HD 134060 planetary system
Companion (in order from star)	Mass	Semimajor axis (AU)	Orbital period (days)	Eccentricity	Inclination (°)	Radius
b	0.0351±0.0021 M_{J}	0.0441±0.0010	3.269555+0.000092 −0.000080	0.480±0.034	—	—
c	0.1507±0.071 M_{J}	2.2263±0.0507	1,160.9±27.046	0.75±0.19	—	—
