= PSR B1509−58 =

Pulsar in the constellation Circinus

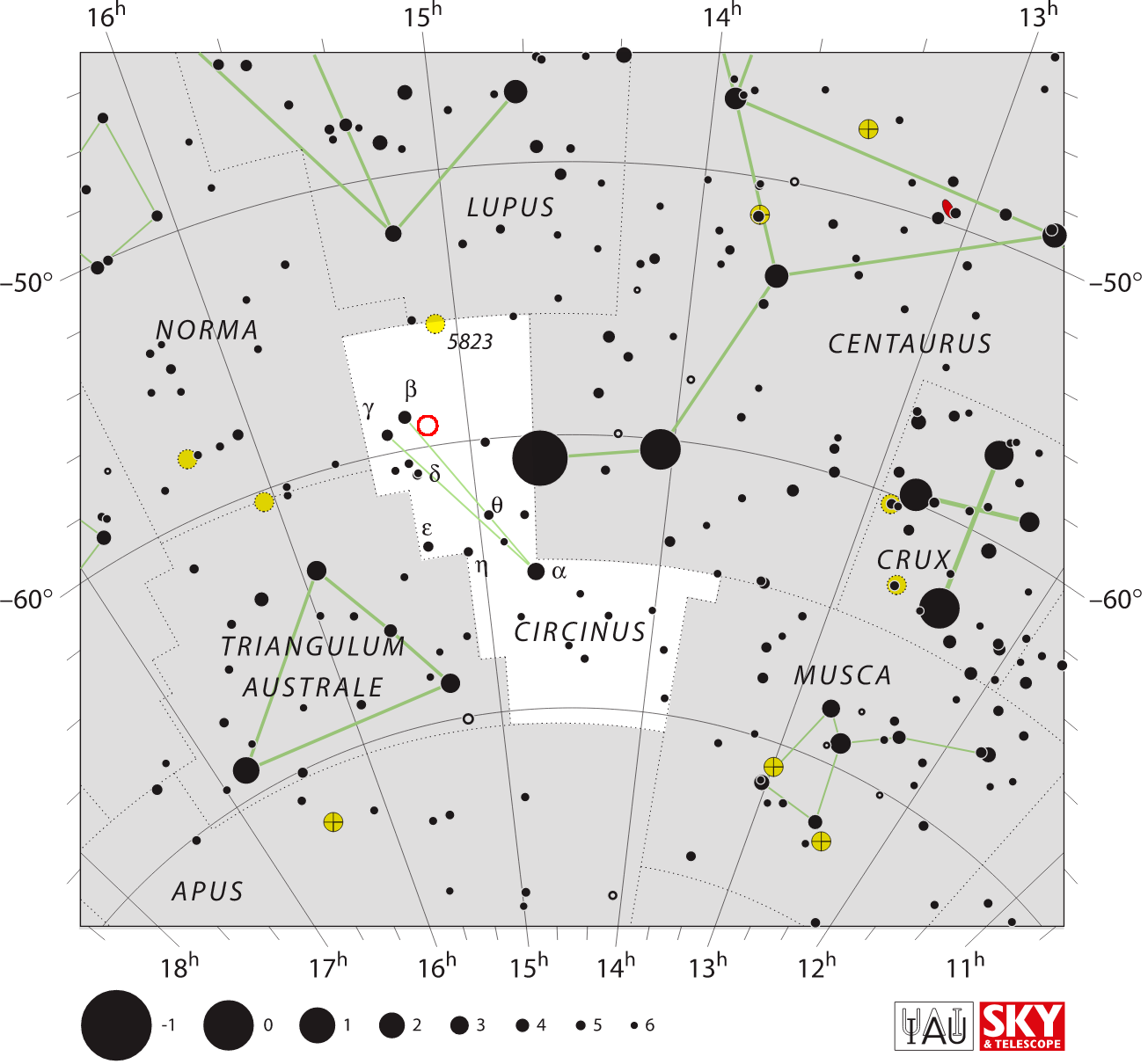

Observation data Epoch J2000 Equinox ICRS
- Constellation: Circinus
- Right ascension: 15^{h} 13^{m} 55.52^{s}
- Declination: −59° 08′ 08.8″

Characteristics
- Spectral type: Pulsar

Astrometry
Distance	17,000 ly (5,200 ± 1,400 pc)

Details
Rotation	0.151581943393 s
Age	1,570 years

Other designations
- PSR 1509–58

Database references
SIMBAD	data

PSR B1509−58 is a pulsar approximately at a distance of 17,000 light-years in the constellation of Circinus discovered by the Einstein X-Ray Observatory in 1982. Its diameter is only 12 miles (19 km). It is located in a Pulsar wind nebula created by itself, that was caused as a remnant of the Supernova (SNR) MSH 15−52 visual approximately 1,700 years ago at the southern celestial hemisphere not visible in the Northern Hemisphere. The nebula spans about 150 light years.

The 0.1515 second (6.597 Hz) pulsations are detected in the radio, X-ray, and γ-ray bands.

NASA described the star as "a rapidly spinning neutron star which is spewing energy out into the space around it to create complex and intriguing structures, including one that resembles a large cosmic hand". It is also known by the name "Hand of God". This phenomenon is called pareidolia and is only temporary.

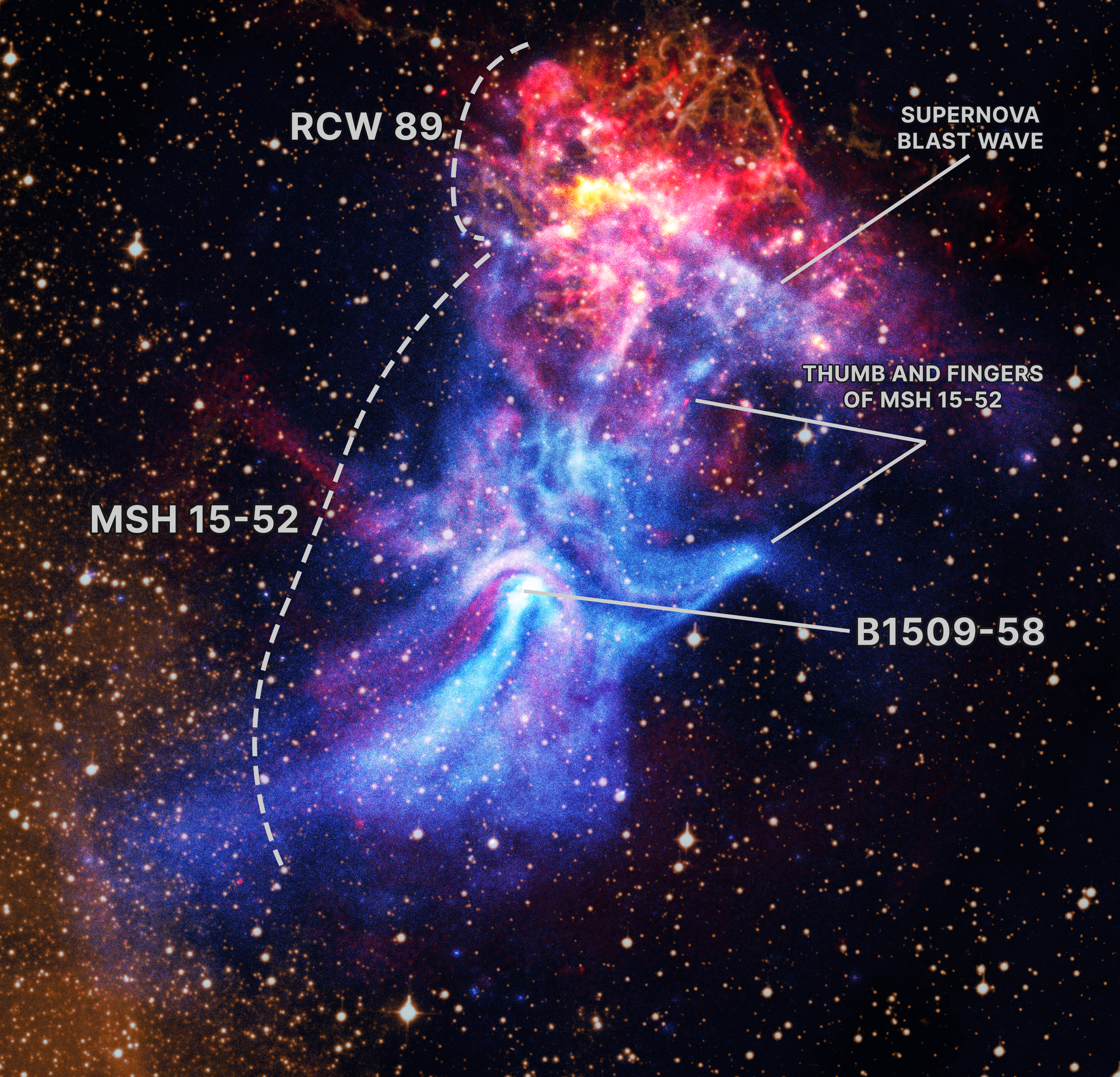
False-color image, nicknamed "Hand of God", from the Chandra X-ray Observatory (CXO), showing low-energy X-rays in red, medium-energy in green, and high-energy in blue. The pulsar (white in the center) also causes the red glowing in the neighboring hot plasma nebula RCW 89 above.

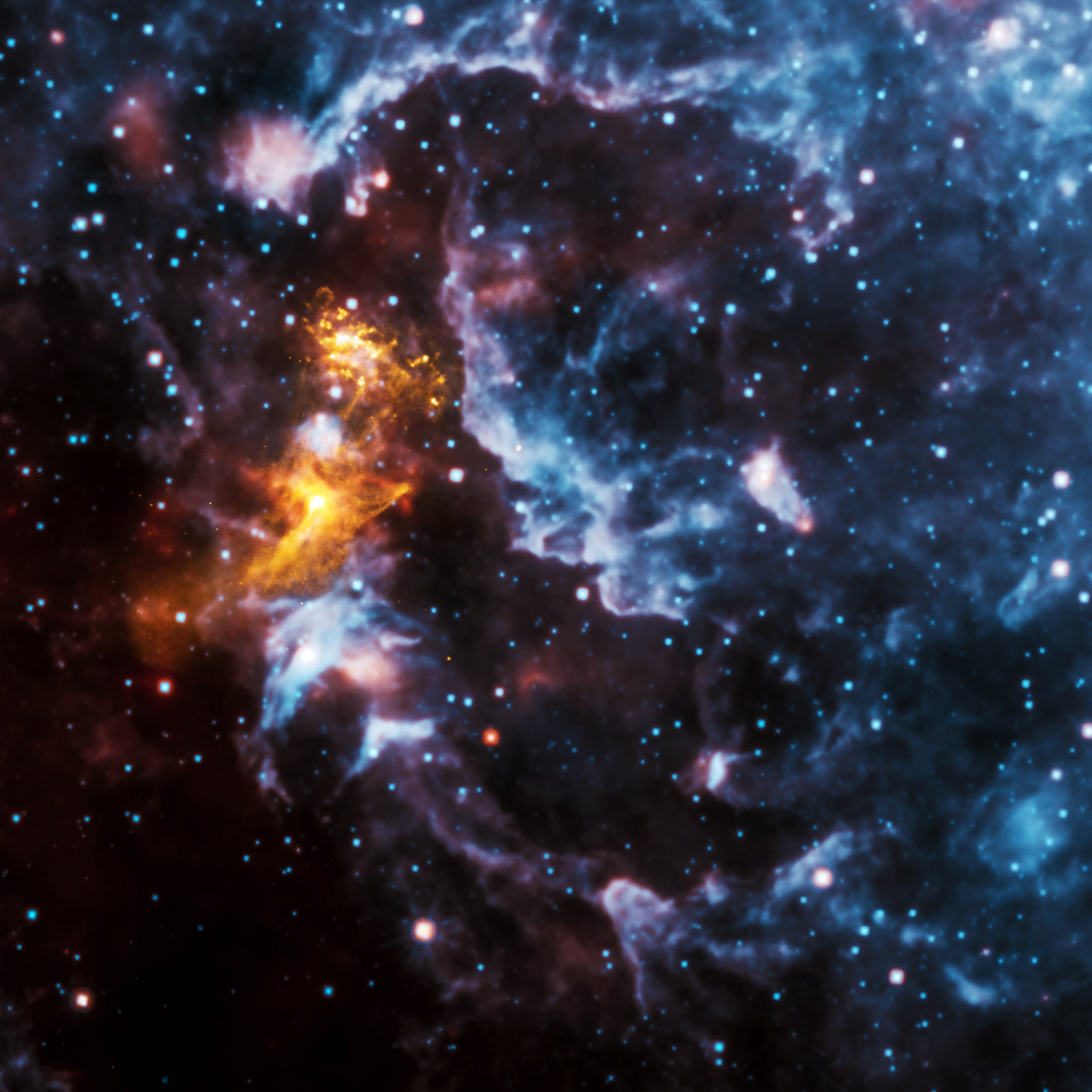
Composite image Chandra X-ray Observatory & WISE: X-rays are gold; infrared in red, green and blue/max.

To track this motion, Chandra data is shown, from 2004, 2008, and then a combined image from observations taken in late 2017 and early 2018. These three epochs are shown in the inset of the main graphic.

Sequence of images of optical, X-ray, radio, and infra-red emission

Tour of PSR B1509−58.

Sequence of PSR B1509−58 images.

Size comparisons: PSR B1509−58 and Crab Nebula.

== See also ==
- List of neutron stars
- Pulsar planet
