= Circinus =

Constellation in the southern celestial hemisphere

- Constellation
- List of stars in Circinus
- Abbreviation: Cir
- Genitive: Circini
- Pronunciation: /ˈsɜːrsɪnəs/ Círcinus, genitive /ˈsɜːrsɪnaɪ/
- Symbolism: Compass
- Right ascension: 13^{h} 38.4^{m} –15^{h} 30.2^{m}
- Declination: −55.43°–−70.62°
- Area: 93 sq. deg. (85th)
- Main stars: 3
- Bayer/Flamsteed stars: 9
- Stars brighter than 3.00^{m}: 0
- Stars within 10.00 pc (32.62 ly): 0
- Brightest star: α Cir (Xami) (3.19^{m})
- Nearest star: DENIS J1454−6604
- Messier objects: 0
- Meteor showers: Alpha Circinids (ACI)
- Bordering constellations: Centaurus; Musca; Apus; Triangulum Australe; Norma; Lupus
- Visible at latitudes between +30° and −90°. Best visible at 21:00 (9 p.m.) during the month of June.

Circinus is a small, faint constellation in the southern sky, first defined in 1756 by the French astronomer Nicolas-Louis de Lacaille. Its name is Latin for compass, referring to the drafting tool used for drawing circles (it should not be confused with Pyxis, a constellation that represents a mariner's compass which points north). Its brightest star is Alpha Circini, with an apparent magnitude of 3.19. Slightly variable, it is the brightest rapidly oscillating Ap star in the night sky. AX Circini is a Cepheid variable visible with the unaided eye, and BX Circini is a faint star thought to have been formed from the merger of two white dwarfs. Two sun-like stars have planetary systems: HD 134060 has two small planets, and HD 129445 has a Jupiter-like planet. Supernova SN 185 appeared in Circinus in 185 AD and was recorded by Chinese observers. Two novae have been observed more recently, in the 20th century.

The Milky Way runs through the constellation, featuring prominent objects such as the open cluster NGC 5823 and the planetary nebula NGC 5315. Circinus hosts a notable spiral galaxy, the Circinus Galaxy, discovered in 1977; it is the closest Seyfert galaxy to the Milky Way. The Alpha Circinids (ACI), a meteor shower also discovered in 1977, radiate from this constellation.

== History ==
In 1756, French astronomer Nicolas-Louis de Lacaille introduced the constellation of Circinus with the French name le Compas, representing a pair of dividing compasses, on a chart of the southern sky. On that chart, Lacaille portrayed the constellations of Norma, Circinus, and Triangulum Australe, respectively, as a set square and ruler, a compass, and a surveyor's level in a set of draughtsman's instruments. Circinus was given its current name in 1763, when Lacaille published an updated sky map with Latin names for the constellations he introduced.

== Characteristics ==
Bordered by Centaurus, Musca, Apus, Triangulum Australe, Norma and Lupus, Circinus lies adjacent to the Alpha and Beta Centauri stars. As it is at declination −50° to −70°, the whole constellation is only visible south of latitude 30° N. The official constellation boundaries, as set by Belgian astronomer Eugène Delporte in 1930, are defined by a polygon of 14 segments. In the equatorial coordinate system, the right ascension coordinates of these borders lie between 13^{h} 38.4^{m} and 15^{h} 30.2^{m} , and the declination coordinates are between −55.43° and −70.62°. Circinus culminates each year at 9 p.m. on 30 July. The recommended three-letter abbreviation for the constellation, as adopted by the International Astronomical Union in 1922, is "Cir".

== Features ==
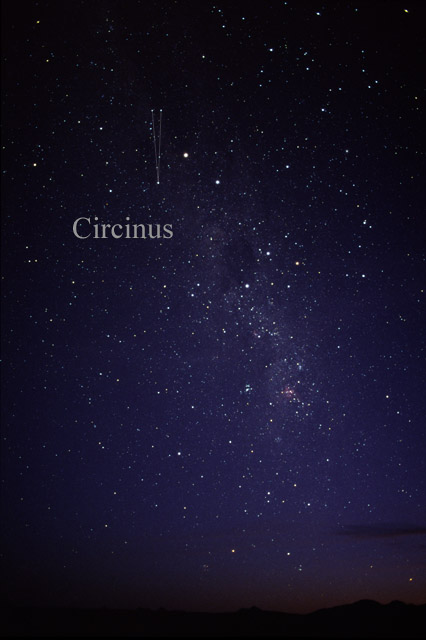
The constellation Circinus as it can be seen by the naked eye.

=== Stars ===
Lacaille charted and gave 8 stars Bayer designations Alpha through Theta in 1756.

Circinus is a faint constellation, with only one star brighter than fourth magnitude. Alpha Circini (Xami), a white main sequence star with an apparent magnitude of 3.19, is 54 light-years away and 4° south of Alpha Centauri. Not only the brightest star in the constellation, it is also the brightest example of a rapidly oscillating Ap (RoAp) star in the night sky. It has the unusual spectral type A7 Vp SrCrEu, showing increased emissions of strontium, chromium and europium. Stars of this type have oddly localised magnetic fields and are slightly variable. Alpha Circini forms a binary star system with an orange dwarf companion of spectral type K5 and magnitude 8.5, which with a separation of 5.7 arcseconds is only discernible with a telescope. The distance between the two stars is 260 AU and they take 2600 years to rotate around a common centre of gravity. The second brightest star is Beta Circini, a white main sequence star of spectral type A3Va and a magnitude of 4.07, about 100 light-years away. It has around 1.8 times the diameter of the Sun.

Gamma Circini is a binary star 450 light-years away, whose components need a telescope of 150 mm to be seen, as they are only 0.8 arcseconds apart. The brighter component is a bluish Be star of spectral type B5IV+ and magnitude 4.51, while the dimmer component is a yellow star of magnitude 5.5. They orbit each other every 180 years. Delta Circini is also a multiple star whose components have magnitudes of 5.1 and 13.4 and orbit around a common centre of gravity every 3.9 days. The brighter component is a close eclipsing binary (specifically, a rotating ellipsoidal variable), with a minor dip of magnitude (0.1). Both are hot blue stars of spectral types O7III-V and O9.5V, respectively, and are estimated to have around 22 and 12 times the Sun's mass. Over 3600 light-years away, this system would outshine Venus at magnitude −4.8 if it were 32 light-years (10 parsecs) distant. The two main components are separated by 50 arcseconds, resolvable to the naked eye for individuals with good vision and easily discernible with a telescope.

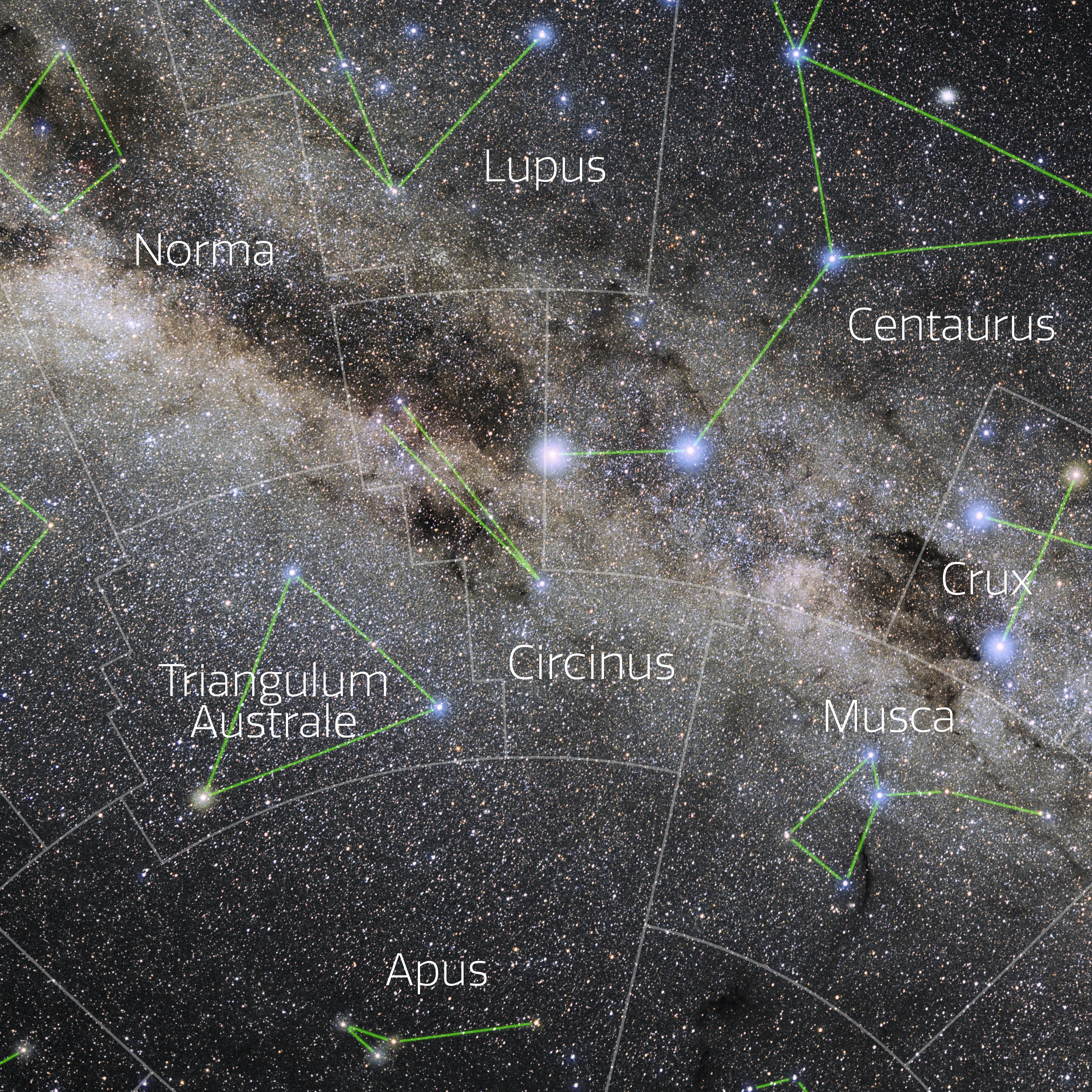
The constellation Circinus showing the IAU boundaries, the constellation stick figure, and labels for its brightest stars. Astrophotograph by Eckhard Slawik, from NOIRLab's 88 Constellations project.

Eta Circini is a yellow giant of spectral type G8III and magnitude 5.17, located around 276 light-years distant, and Zeta Circini is a blue-white main sequence star of spectral type B3V and magnitude 6.09, located around 1273 light-years away.

493 variable stars have been recorded in Circinus, but most have a very small range or are quite dim. Three prominent examples are Theta Circini, T Circini, and AX Circini. Theta Circini is a B-class irregular variable, ranging in magnitude from 5.0 to 5.4. T Circini has a B-type spectrum, ranging in magnitude from 10.6 to 9.3 over a period of 3.298 days, although it is actually an eclipsing binary system rather than a pulsating star. AX is a Cepheid variable that varies between magnitudes 5.6 and 6.19 over 5.3 days. It is a yellow-white supergiant of spectral type F8II+, 1600 light-years away. BP Circini is another Cepheid variable with an apparent magnitude ranging from 7.37 to 7.71 over 2.4 days. Both cepheids are spectroscopic binaries, with companions that are blue-white stars of spectral type B6 and 5 and 4.7 solar masses, respectively. BX Circini is a faint star that fluctuates between magnitudes 12.57 and 12.62 over a period of 2 hours 33 minutes. Over 99% of its composition appears to be helium. Its origin is unclear, but thought to be the result of the merger of a helium and a carbon/oxygen white dwarf.

Several stars with planetary systems lie within the borders of Circinus, although none of the host stars are particularly prominent. HD 134060 is a sun-like yellow dwarf star of spectral type G0VFe+0.4 and magnitude 6.29, around 79 light-years away. Its two planets were discovered in 2011 through the radial velocity method: the smaller, HD 134060 b, has a mass of 0.0351 M_{J} (Jupiter masses) and orbits its star every 3.27 days, at 0.0444 AU; the larger, HD 134060 c (0.15 M_{J}), orbits farther out at 2.226 AU, with a period of approximately 1161 days. Even fainter, at magnitude 8.8, HD 129445 is 220 light-years away and has 99% of the Sun's mass and a similar spectral type of G8V. HD 129445 b, a Jupiter-like planet (1.6 M_{J}) discovered in 2010 via the radial velocity method, orbits this star at a distance of 2.9 AU, approximately every 1840 days.

As this constellation intersects the plane of the Milky Way, there are many massive stars located in this constellation, including GKF2010 MN18 (or simply MN18), a blue supergiant located in a bipolar nebula, as well as 9 Wolf-Rayet stars, a very high number for such a small constellation.

=== Deep-sky objects ===
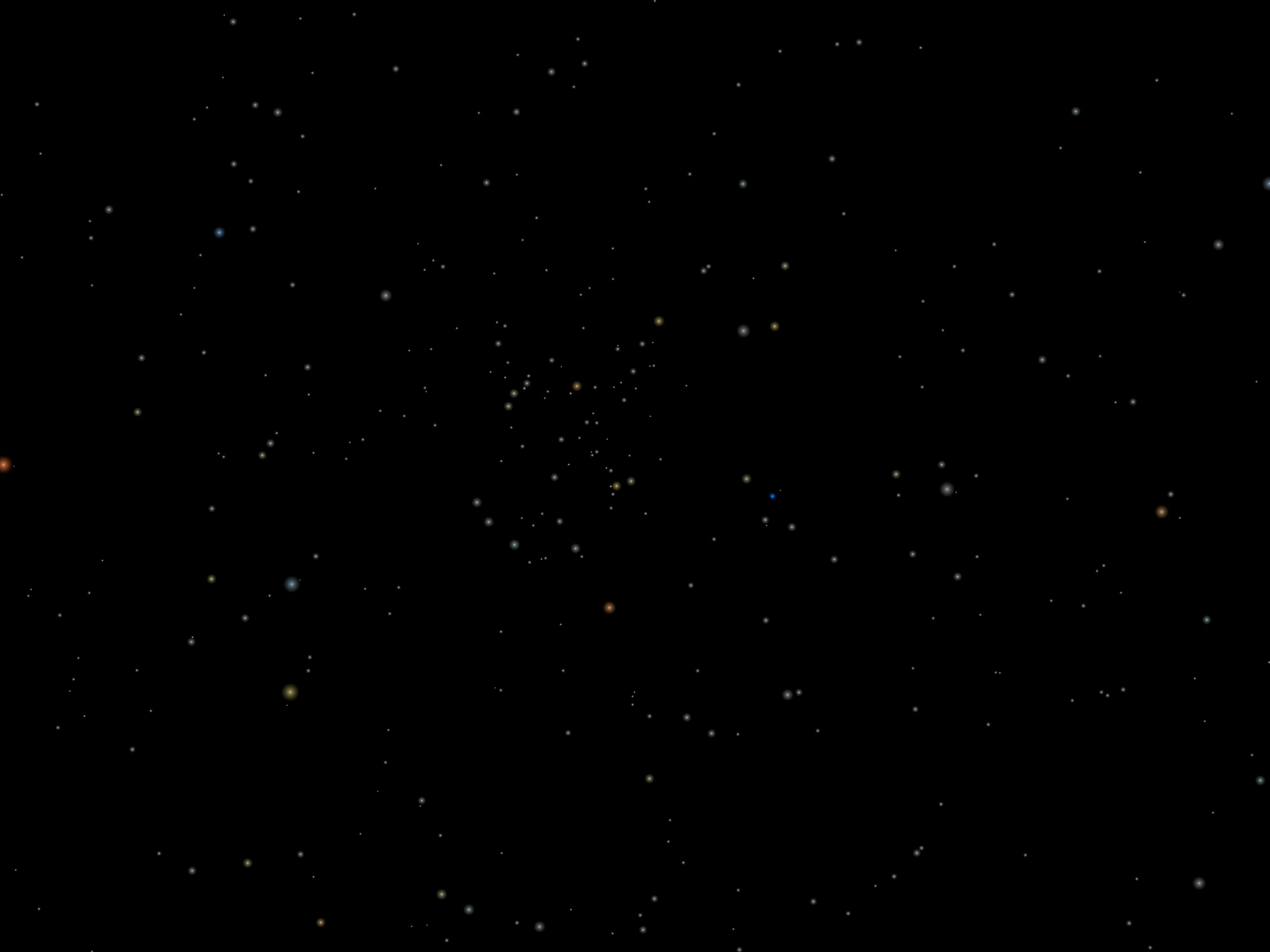
An astrophotograph of NGC 5823, showing its backwards S shape

Three open clusters and a planetary nebulae are found within the borders of Circinus, all visible with amateur telescopes of varying sizes. NGC 5823, also called Caldwell 88, is an 800-million-year-old open cluster, located 3500 light-years away and spanning a 12-light-year region along the constellation's northern border. Despite having an integrated magnitude of 7.9, the cluster can be seen by star hopping from Beta Circini or from Alpha Centauri. It contains 80–100 stars of 10th magnitude and fainter, which are spread out over a diameter of 10 arcseconds. The brighter stars, however, are not true members of the cluster, as they are closer to the Earth than the dimmer ones. NGC 5823 appears distinct to the observer, sometimes seen as a reversed "S", as described by John Herschel, although it has also been described as "tulip-shaped" and "boxy". That cluster can be easily mistaken with a similar cluster, NGC 5822, nearby in Lupus. Comparatively, open cluster NGC 5715 is fainter (integrated magnitude of 9.8)—its brightest star is only 11th magnitude—and smaller (7.0 arcminutes), comprising only 30 stars. The third open cluster, Pismis 20, contains 12 stars in a diameter of 4.5 arcseconds but exhibits a magnitude similar to NGC 5823 (7.8). At 8270 light-years, it requires an amateur telescope with an aperture over 300 mm to be easily discerned.

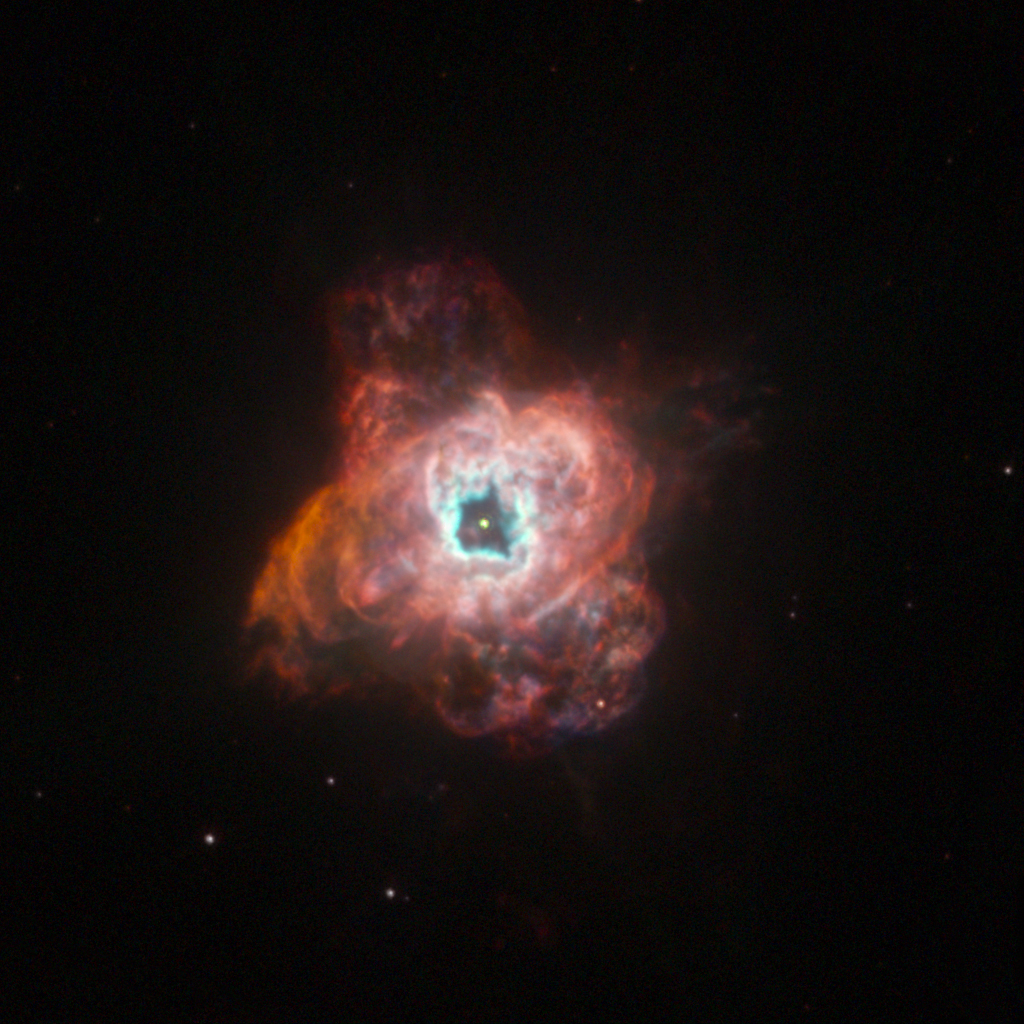
Hubble Space Telescope's view of NGC 5315, showing its intricate structure and central star

The planetary nebula NGC 5315 has a magnitude of 9.8 around a central star of magnitude 14.2, located 5.2 degrees west-southwest of Alpha Circini. It is only visible as a disc at magnifications over 200-fold. Bernes 145 is a dark and reflection nebula first listed in the 1971 Bernes Catalog. The dark nebula component is easily visible in a large amateur telescope, and it measures 12 by 5 arcminutes. The smaller reflection nebula component requires a larger instrument and averted vision to be seen.

Circinus also houses ESO 97-G13, commonly known as the Circinus Galaxy. Discovered in 1977, it is a relatively unobscured galaxy (magnitude 10.6), which is unusual for galaxies located in constellations near the Milky Way, since their dim light is obscured by gas and dust. This oblong spiral galaxy with 6.9 by 3.0 arcminutes and 26,000 light-years in diameter, is located 13 million light-years away from Earth and lies 4 degrees off the galactic plane. It is the closest Seyfert galaxy to the Milky Way, and therefore hosts an active galactic nucleus.

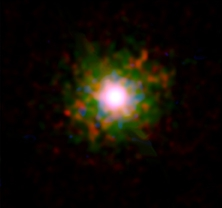
The Chandra X-ray Observatory's false-color image of Circinus X-1 showing its jets

Circinus X-1 is an X-ray binary star system that includes a neutron star. Observations of Circinus X-1 in July 2007 revealed the presence of X-ray jets normally found in black hole systems. Located at 19,000 light-years, the pulsar PSR B1509-58, also called the Circinus Pulsar, has expelled a 20-light-year-long jet of material from its southern pole, clearly visible in the X-ray spectrum. Another supernova remnant in Circinus is that of SN 185. Recorded by Chinese observers in 185 AD, SN 185 was visible in the night sky for around eight months; its remnants, known as RCW 86, cover an area larger than the typical full moon.

A white dwarf star in a close binary system can accumulate material from its companion until it ignites and blows off in a thermonuclear explosion, known as a nova. These stars generally brighten by 7 to 16 magnitudes. Nova Circini 1926, also known as X Circini, was observed at magnitude 6.5 on 3 September 1926, before fading and fluctuating between magnitudes 11.7 and 12.5, during 1928, and magnitude 13, in 1929. Nova Circini 1995 (BY Circini) reached a maximum apparent magnitude of 7.2 in January 1995. BW Circini is a low mass X-ray binary system, comprising a black hole of around 8 solar masses and a yellow G0III-G5III subgiant star. X-ray outbursts were recorded in 1987 and 1997, and possibly 1971–72.

=== Meteor showers ===
Circinus is the radiant of an annual meteor shower, the Alpha Circinids (ACI). First observed in Queensland in 1977, the meteors have an average velocity of 27.1 km/s and are thought to be associated with a long-period comet. In 2011, Peter Jenniskens proposed that the debris trail of comet C/1969 T1 could intersect with the Earth's orbit and generate a meteor outburst coming from a radiant close to Beta Circini. The ACI shower peaks on 4 June, the day it was first observed.

== See also ==
- Circinus (Chinese astronomy)
