= BP Circini =

Star in the constellation Circinus

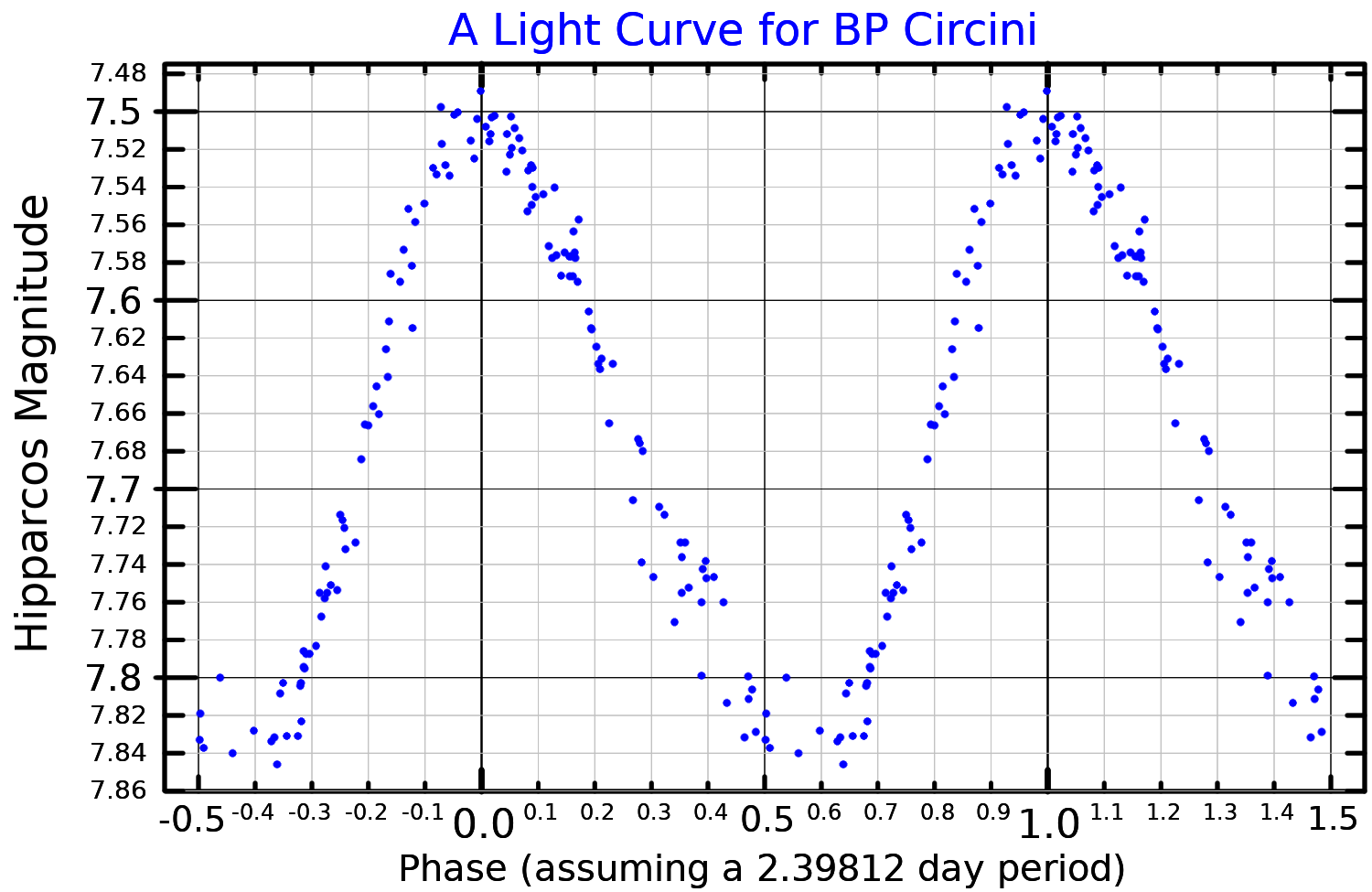
- A light curve for BP Circini, plotted from Hipparcos data

Observation data Epoch J2000 Equinox J2000
- Constellation: Circinus
- Right ascension: 14^{h} 46^{m} 41.98011^{s}
- Declination: −61° 27′ 42.9903″
- Apparent magnitude (V): 7.37 - 7.71

Characteristics
- Spectral type: F2/3II + B6V
- B−V color index: 0.649±0.020

Astrometry
Proper motion (μ)	RA: −5.355 mas/yr Dec.: −3.920 mas/yr
Parallax (π)	0.9952±0.0402 mas
Distance	3,300 ± 100 ly (1,000 ± 40 pc)
Absolute magnitude (M_{V})	−2.91

Orbit
Period (P)	20 yr
Semi-major axis (a)	15.8 AU

Details

A
Mass	5 M_{☉}
Radius	30.38+6.93 −6.50 R_{☉}
Luminosity	917±54 L_{☉}
Surface gravity (log g)	2.75 cgs
Temperature	6356±23 K

B
Mass	4.7 M_{☉}
Surface gravity (log g)	4.0±0.5 cgs
Temperature	16,000±1,000 K

Other designations
- BP Cir, CD−60°5320, HD 129708, HIP 72264, SAO 252879, WDS J14467-6128A

Database references
SIMBAD	data

BP Circini is a binary star system in the southern constellation of Circinus. It is located at a distance of approximately 3,300 light years from the Sun based on parallax.

The variability of this star was discovered by D. W. Kurtz in 1979. A small-amplitude Cepheid variable, its apparent magnitude ranges from 7.37 to 7.71 over 2.39810 days. A spectroscopic binary, the primary is a yellow-white bright giant of spectral type F2 or F3II. The spectrum shows peculiarities in the metallic lines. The secondary is a 4.7 solar mass (M_{☉}) blue-white main sequence star of spectral type B6.
