= Alpha Circini =

Star in the constellation Circinus

α Circini
- Location of α Circini (circled)

Observation data Epoch J2000 Equinox ICRS
- Constellation: Circinus
- Right ascension: 14^{h} 42^{m} 30.41958^{s}
- Declination: −64° 58′ 30.4934″
- Apparent magnitude (V): 3.18 - 3.21

Characteristics
- Spectral type: A7 Vp SrCrEu
- U−B color index: +0.12
- B−V color index: +0.24
- Variable type: roAp

Astrometry
Radial velocity (R_{v})	+7.2 km/s
Proper motion (μ)	RA: −192.53 mas/yr Dec.: −233.51 mas/yr
Parallax (π)	60.35±0.14 mas
Distance	54.0 ± 0.1 ly (16.57 ± 0.04 pc)
Absolute magnitude (M_{V})	+2.18

Details
Mass	1.5–1.7 M_{☉}
Radius	1.967±0.066 R_{☉}
Luminosity	10.51±0.60 L_{☉}
Surface gravity (log g)	4.1 cgs
Temperature	7,500 K
Metallicity [Fe/H]	0.13 dex
Rotation	4.4790±0.0001 days
Rotational velocity (v sin i)	13.0±1.5 km/s
Age	~12 Myr

Other designations
- Xami, 17 G. Cir, α Cir, CD−64°867, GJ 560, HD 128898, HIP 71908, HR 5463, SAO 252853

Database references
SIMBAD	A
- B

Alpha Circini is a variable star in the faint, southern, circumpolar constellation of Circinus. It has the proper name Xami; Alpha Circini is its Bayer designation, which is Latinized from α Circini and abbreviated Alpha Cir or α Cir. At an apparent visual magnitude of 3.19, it is the brightest star in the constellation and can be readily seen with the naked eye from the southern hemisphere to as far north as 25° north latitude. Parallax measurements of this star yield an estimated distance of 54.0 light-years (16.6 parsecs) from the Earth. There is a K dwarf companion star, Alpha Circini B.

== Observations ==
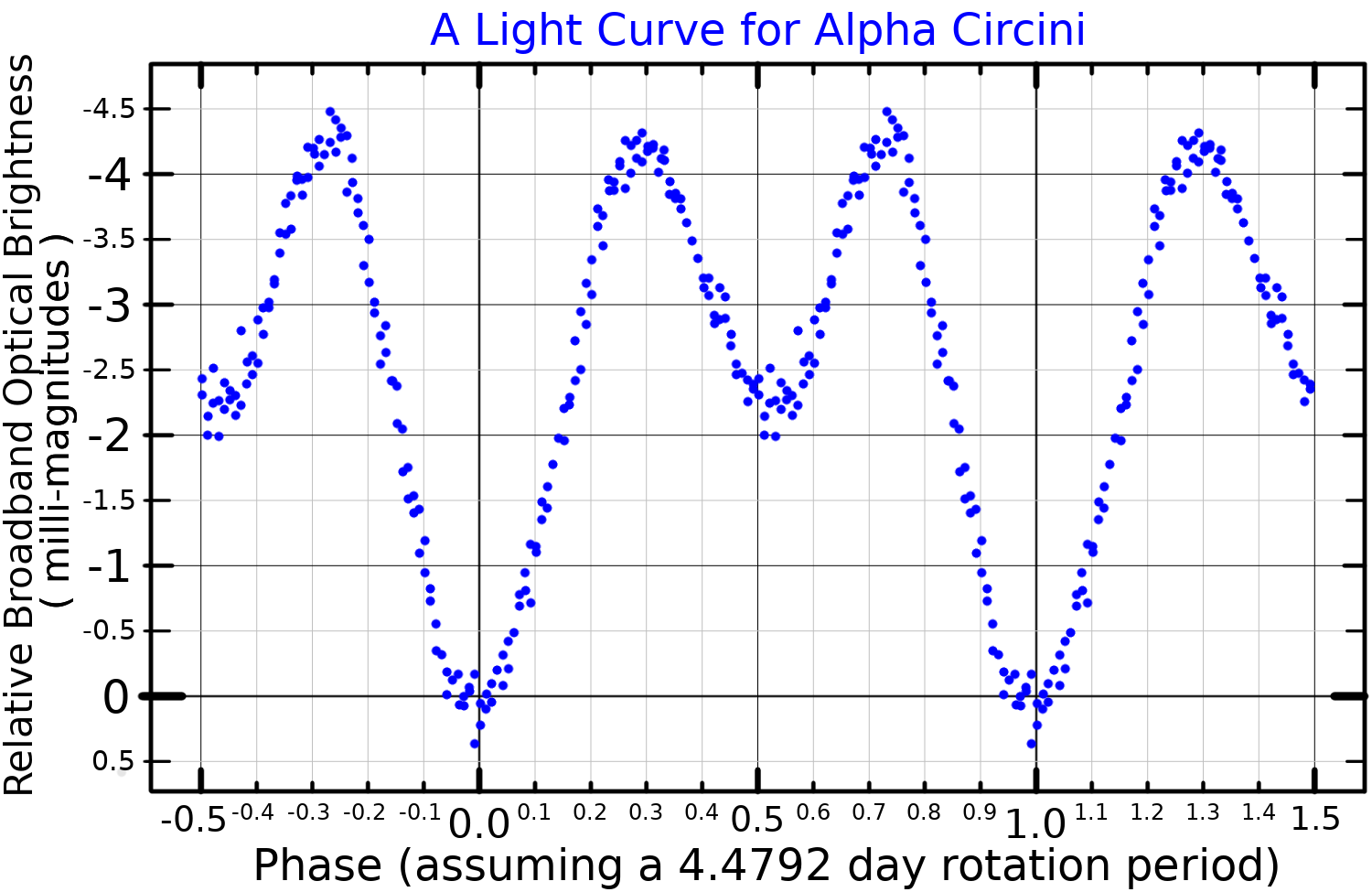
A light curve for Alpha Circini, adapted from Bruntt et al. (2009)

This star belongs to a class of variables known as rapidly oscillating Ap stars. It oscillates with multiple, non-radial pulsation cycles and a dominant cycle of 6.8 minutes. The spectrum shows peculiar features caused by chemical stratification of the outer atmosphere. It displays a moderate deficiency of carbon, nitrogen and oxygen, while there is an overabundance of chromium (Cr). The stellar classification of A7 Vp SrCrEu indicates that this is a main sequence star with enhanced levels of strontium (Sr), chromium, and europium (Eu) in its atmosphere (compared to a typical star like the Sun).

The mass of Alpha Circini is about 150% to 170% the mass of the Sun and it has double the Sun's radius, while the luminosity is more than 10 times that of the Sun. The effective temperature of the outer envelope is about 7,500 K, giving it the white hue typical of A-type stars. It is rotating with a period of 4.5 days and the pole is inclined by about 37 ± 4° to the line of sight from the Earth.

Based upon its location and motion through space, Alpha Circini is a candidate member of a stellar kinematic group known as the Beta Pictoris moving group. This group shares a common origin and has an estimated age of about 12 million years. At the birth of this group, Alpha Circini was estimated to be located at a distance of about 91 ly (28 pc) from the center of the assemblage.

The IAU Working Group on Star Names approved the name Xami for this star on 12 December 2024 and it is now so entered in the IAU Catalog of Star Names. This refers to an indigenous South African asterism "Eyes of the Lion", consisting of Alpha and Beta Centauri. If these stars are the lion's eyes, the lion's face covers Alpha Circini. (See also Xamidimura.)
