= OGLE-LMC-CEP0227 =

Variable star in the Large Magellanic Cloud

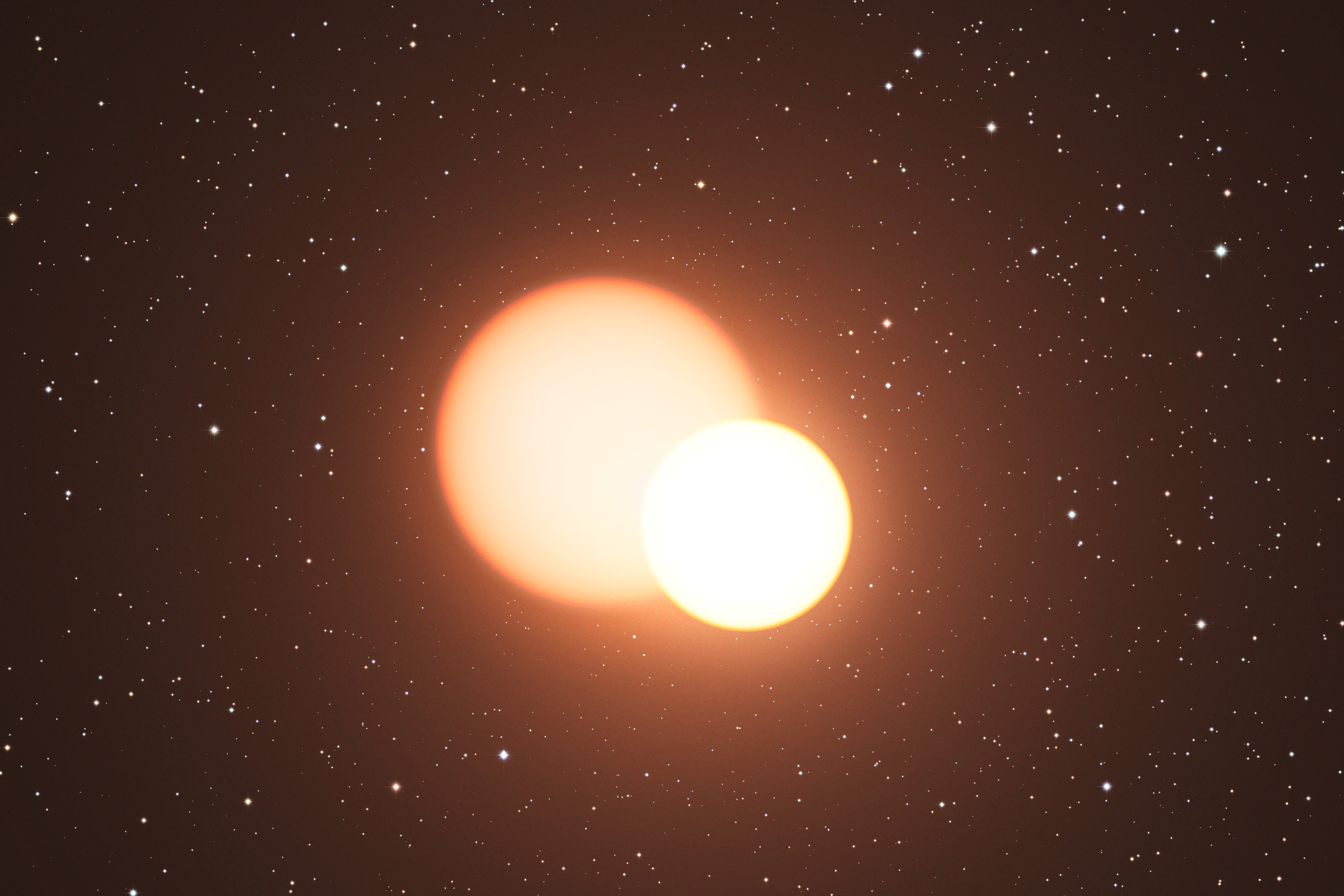
- Artist’s impression of OGLE-LMC-CEP0227; Credit: ESO

Observation data Epoch J2000 Equinox ICRS
- Constellation: Mensa
- Right ascension: 04^{h} 52^{m} 15.678^{s}
- Declination: −70° 14′ 31.33″
- Apparent magnitude (V): 15.317

Characteristics
- Spectral type: F7Ib + G4II (Note: The spectral type, radius, gravity, temperature, luminosity, and observed magnitudes for the Cepheid are mean values, since the star pulsates regularly.)
- Apparent magnitude (J): 13.727
- Apparent magnitude (H): 13.217
- Apparent magnitude (K): 13.262
- Variable type: Eclipsing binary, δ Cep

Astrometry
Distance	163,000 ly (50,000 pc)

Orbit
Period (P)	309.404±0.002 days
Semi-major axis (a)	389.86±0.77
Eccentricity (e)	0.1659±0.0006
Inclination (i)	86.833±0.016°
Argument of periastron (ω) (secondary)	342.0±0.6°

Details

A (Cepheid)
Mass	4.165±0.032 M_{☉}
Radius	34.92±0.34 R_{☉}
Luminosity	1,439 L_{☉}
Surface gravity (log g)	1.971±0.011 cgs
Temperature	6,050±160 K

B
Mass	4.134±0.037 M_{☉}
Radius	44.85±0.29 R_{☉}
Surface gravity (log g)	1.751±0.010 cgs
Temperature	5,120±130 K
Rotational velocity (v sin i)	11.1±1.2 km/s

Other designations
- 2MASS J04521567-7014313

Database references
SIMBAD	data

OGLE-LMC-CEP0227 is an eclipsing binary and Cepheid variable star, pulsating every 3.8 days. The star, in the Large Magellanic Cloud, was the first Cepheid star system found to be orbiting exactly edge on.

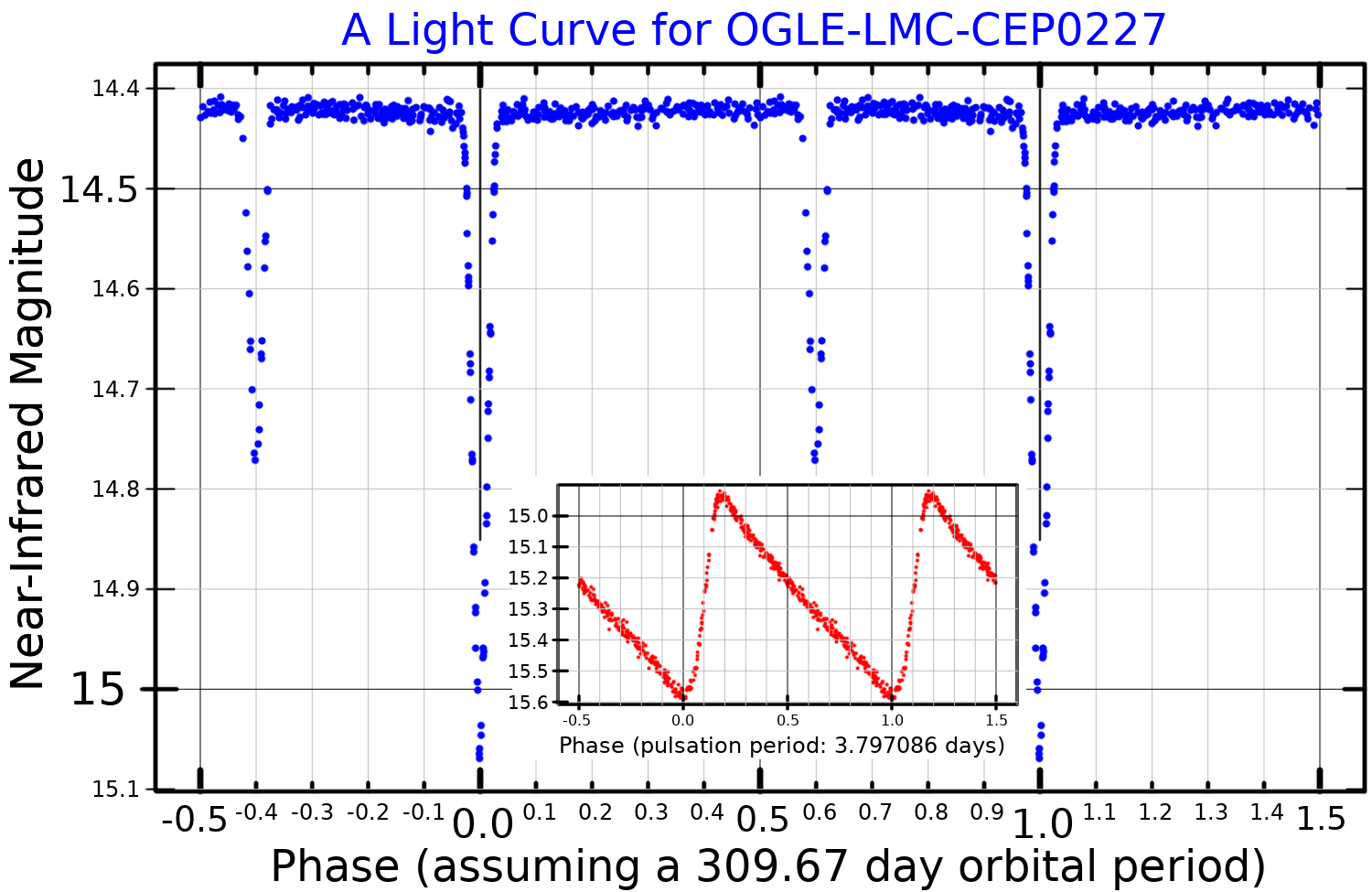
A near-infrared (I band) light curve for OGLE-LMC-CEP0227, adapted from Pietrzyński et al. (2010). The main plot shows the eclipse light curve, with the Cepheid variation removed, and the inset plot shows the Cepheid variation.

The OGLE-LMC-CEP0227 system contains two stars which orbit each other almost exactly 'edge on' to the line of sight from the Earth. This unique configuration has allowed astronomers to refine their understanding of classical Cepheid variable stars. Studies of this system have allowed astronomers to measure the Cepheid mass with unprecedented accuracy. There is still disagreement over whether the pulsational properties accurately match the mass derived from the observed orbit.

The two stars orbit each other every 309 days, and each has a mass close to 4.1 M_{☉}. The primary component has an effective temperature of 6,050 K and the secondary a temperature of 5,120 K.
