= Classical Cepheid variable =

Type of variable star

Hertzsprung–Russell diagram showing the location of several types of variable stars superimposed on a display of the different luminosity classes.

Classical Cepheids are a type of Cepheid variable star. They are young, population I variable stars that exhibit regular radial pulsations with periods of a fraction of a day to weeks, and visual amplitudes ranging from a few tenths of a magnitude up to about 2 magnitudes. Classical Cepheids are also known as Population I Cepheids, Type I Cepheids, and Delta Cepheid variables.

There exists a well-defined relationship between a classical Cepheid variable's luminosity and pulsation period, securing Cepheids as viable standard candles for establishing the galactic and extragalactic distance scales. Hubble Space Telescope (HST) observations of classical Cepheid variables have enabled firmer constraints on Hubble's law, which describes the expansion rate of the observable Universe. Classical Cepheids have also been used to clarify many characteristics of our galaxy, such as the local spiral arm structure and the Sun's distance from the galactic plane.

Around 3,600 classical Cepheids are known in the Milky Way galaxy. Nearly ten thousand are known in the Magellanic Clouds, with hundreds discovered in other galaxies; the Hubble Space Telescope has identified some in NGC 4603, which is 100 million light years distant.

== Properties ==
The evolutionary track of 5 M_{☉} star crossing the instability strip during a helium burning blue loop

Classical Cepheid variables are 4–20 times more massive than the Sun, and around 1,000 to 50,000 (over 200,000 for the unusual V810 Centauri) times more luminous. Spectroscopically they are bright giants or low luminosity supergiants of spectral class F6–K2. The temperature and spectral type vary as they pulsate. Their radii are a few tens to a few hundred times that of the sun. More luminous Cepheids are cooler and larger and have longer periods. Along with the temperature changes their radii also change during each pulsation (e.g. by ~25% for the longer period l Car), resulting in brightness variations up to two magnitudes. The brightness changes are more pronounced at shorter wavelengths.

Cepheid variables may pulsate in a fundamental mode, the first overtone, or rarely a mixed mode. Pulsations in an overtone higher than first are rare but interesting. The majority of classical Cepheids are thought to be fundamental mode pulsators, although it is not easy to distinguish the mode from the shape of the light curve. Stars pulsating in an overtone are more luminous and larger than a fundamental mode pulsator with the same period.

When an intermediate mass star (IMS) first evolves away from the main sequence, it crosses the instability strip rapidly while the hydrogen shell is still burning. When the helium core ignites in an IMS, it may execute a blue loop and crosses the instability strip again, once while evolving to high temperatures and again evolving back towards the asymptotic giant branch. Stars more massive than about 8–12 M_{☉} start core helium burning before reaching the red-giant branch and become red supergiants but may still execute a blue loop through the instability strip. The duration and even existence of blue loops is sensitive to the mass, metallicity, and helium abundance of the star. In some cases, stars may cross the instability strip for a fourth and fifth time when helium shell burning starts. The rate of change of the period of a Cepheid variable, along with chemical abundances detectable in the spectrum, can be used to deduce which crossing a particular star is making.

Classical Cepheid variables were B type main-sequence stars earlier than about B7, possibly late O stars, before they ran out of hydrogen in their cores. More massive and hotter stars develop into more luminous Cepheids with longer periods, although it is expected that young stars within our own galaxy, at near solar metallicity, will generally lose sufficient mass by the time they first reach the instability strip that they will have periods of 50 days or less. Above a certain mass, 20–50 M_{☉} depending on metallicity, red supergiants will evolve back to blue supergiants rather than execute a blue loop, but they will do so as unstable yellow hypergiants rather than regularly pulsating Cepheid variables. Very massive stars never cool sufficiently to reach the instability strip and do not become Cepheids. At low metallicity, for example in the Magellanic Clouds, stars can retain more mass and become more luminous Cepheids with longer periods.

== Light curves ==
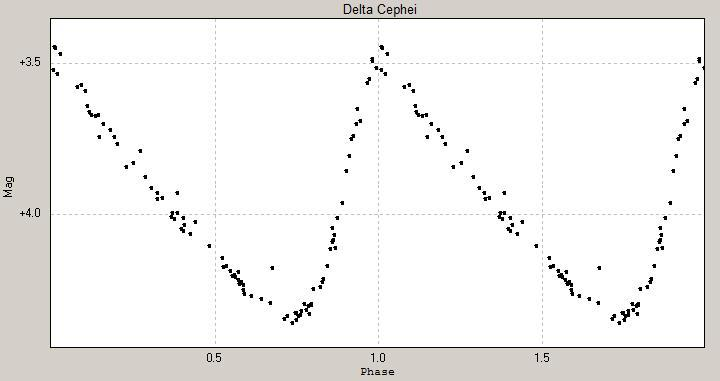
Delta Cephei lightcurve

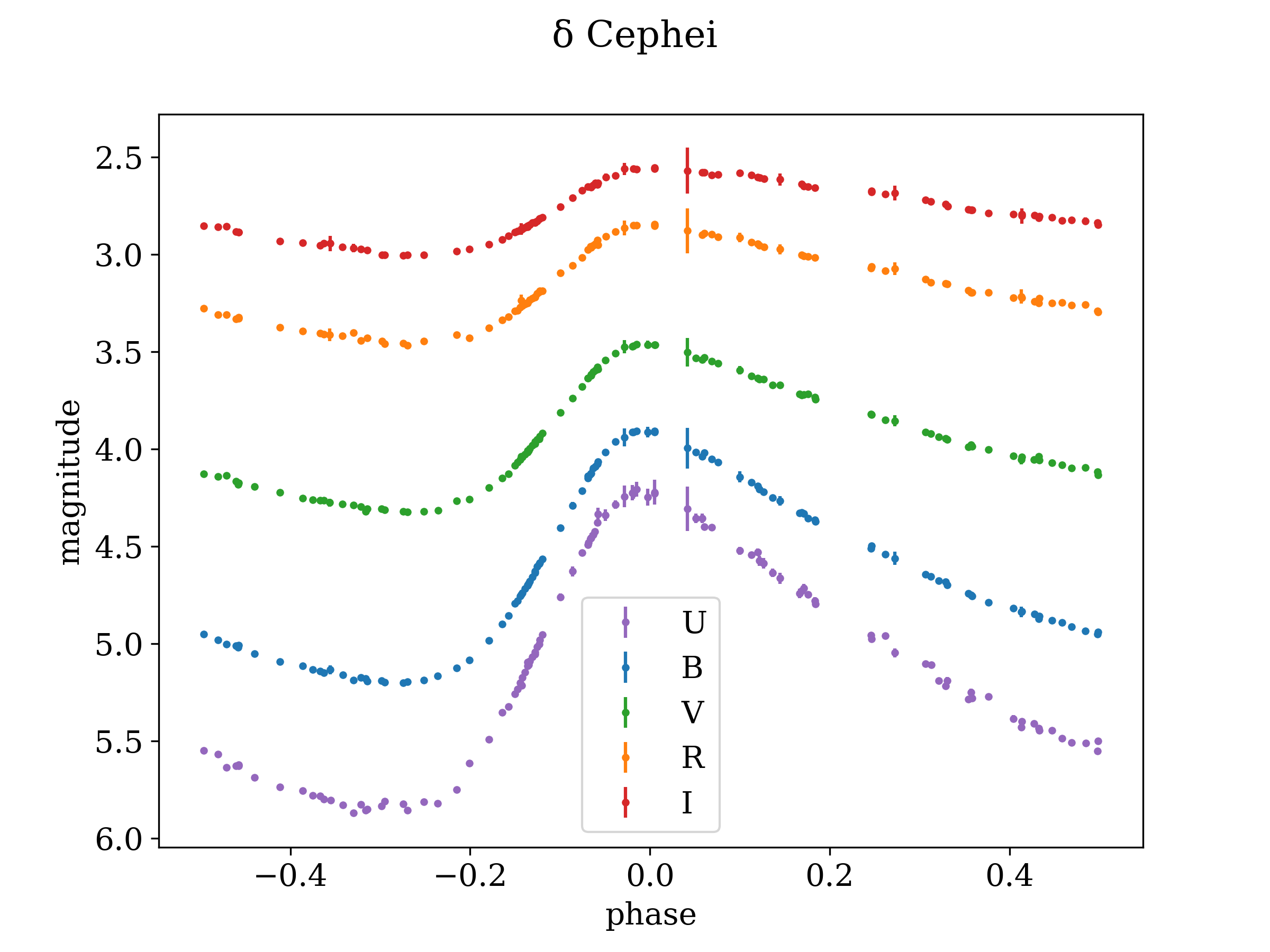
Phase-folded UBVRI light curves of Delta Cephei, prototype of the classical Cepheids, showing magnitude versus pulsation phase

A Cepheid light curve is typically asymmetric with a rapid rise to maximum light followed by a slower fall to minimum (e.g. Delta Cephei). This is due to the phase difference between the radius and temperature variations and is considered characteristic of a fundamental mode pulsator, the most common type of type I Cepheid. In some cases, the smooth pseudo-sinusoidal light curve shows a "bump", a brief slowing of the decline or even a small rise in brightness, thought to be due to a resonance between the fundamental and second overtone. The bump is most commonly seen on the descending branch for stars with periods around 6 days (e.g. Eta Aquilae). As the period increases, the location of the bump moves closer to the maximum and may cause a double maximum, or become indistinguishable from the primary maximum, for stars having periods around 10 days (e.g. Zeta Geminorum). At longer periods the bump can be seen on the ascending branch of the light curve (e.g. X Cygni), but for period longer than 20 days the resonance disappears.

A minority of classical Cepheids show nearly symmetric sinusoidal light curves. These are referred to as s-Cepheids, usually have lower amplitudes, and commonly have short periods. The majority of these are thought to be first overtone (e.g. X Sagittarii), or higher, pulsators, although some unusual stars apparently pulsating in the fundamental mode also show this shape of light curve (e.g. S Vulpeculae). Stars pulsating in the first overtone are expected to only occur with short periods in our galaxy, although they may have somewhat longer periods at lower metallicity, for example in the Magellanic Clouds. Higher overtone pulsators and Cepheids pulsating in two overtones at the same time are also more common in the Magellanic Clouds, and they usually have low amplitude somewhat irregular light curves.

== Discovery ==
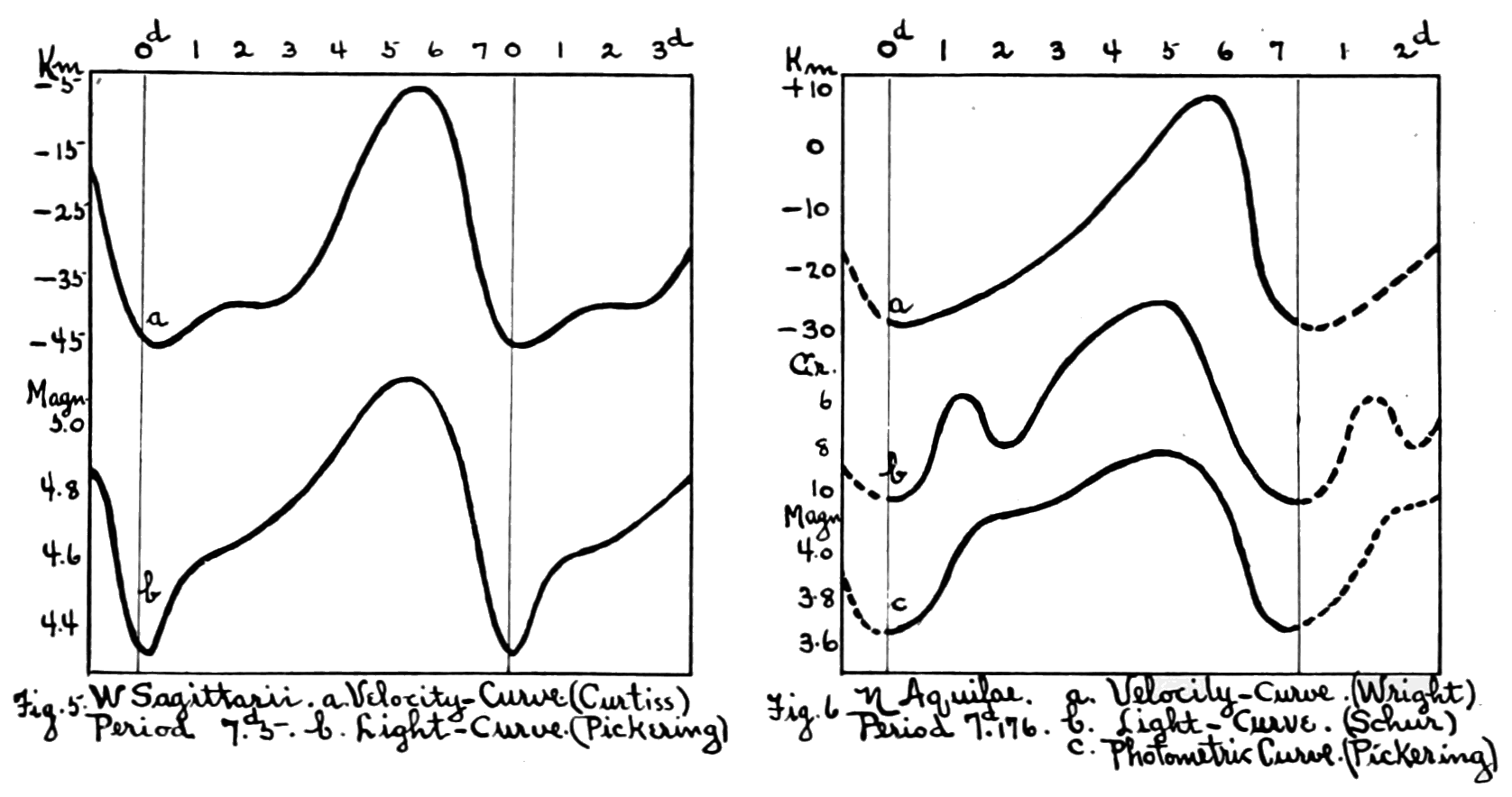
Historical light curves of W Sagittarii and Eta Aquilae

On September 10, 1784, Edward Pigott detected the variability of Eta Aquilae, the first known representative of the class of classical Cepheid variables. However, the namesake for classical Cepheids is the star Delta Cephei, discovered to be variable by John Goodricke a month later. Delta Cephei is also of particular importance as a calibrator for the period–luminosity relation since its distance is among the most precisely established for a Cepheid, thanks in part to its membership in a star cluster and the availability of precise Hubble Space Telescope and Hipparcos parallaxes.

== Period–luminosity relation ==
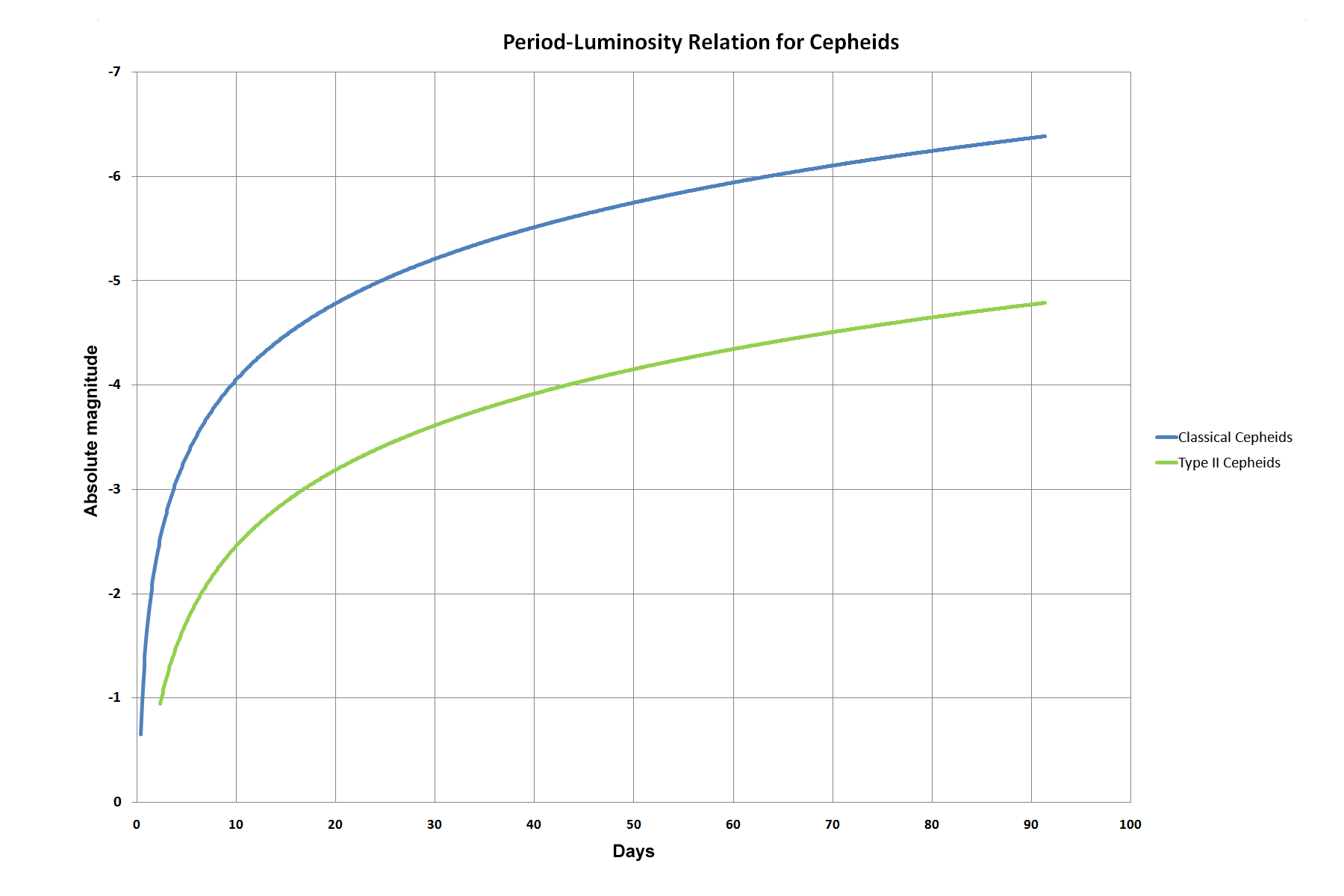
The two period–luminosity characteristics of classic and type II Cepheids

A classical Cepheid's luminosity is directly related to its period of variation. The longer the pulsation period, the more luminous the star. The period–luminosity relation for classical Cepheids was discovered in 1908 by Henrietta Swan Leavitt in an investigation of thousands of variable stars in the Magellanic Clouds. She published it in 1912 with further evidence. Once the period–luminosity relation is calibrated, the luminosity of a given Cepheid whose period is known can be established. Their distance is then found from their apparent brightness. The period–luminosity relation has been calibrated by many astronomers throughout the twentieth century, beginning with Hertzsprung. Calibrating the period–luminosity relation has been problematic; however, a firm Galactic calibration was established by Benedict et al. 2007 using precise HST parallaxes for 10 nearby classical Cepheids. Also, in 2008, ESO astronomers estimated with a precision within 1% the distance to the Cepheid RS Puppis, using light echos from a nebula in which it is embedded. However, that latter finding has been actively debated in the literature.

The following experimental correlations between a Population I Cepheid's period P and its mean absolute magnitude M_{v} was established from Hubble Space Telescope trigonometric parallaxes for 10 nearby Cepheids:

$M_\mathrm{v} = (-2.43\pm0.12) \left(\log_{10}P - 1\right) - (4.05 \pm 0.02)\,$

with P measured in days.

The following relations can also be used to calculate the distance d to classical Cepheids:

$5\log_{10}{d}=V+ 3.34 \log_{10}{P} - 2.45 (V-I) + 10.52\,$

or

$5\log_{10}{d}=V+ 3.37 \log_{10}{P} - 2.55 (V-I) + 10.48\,$

I and V represent near infrared and visual apparent mean magnitudes, respectively. The distance d is in parsecs.

== Small amplitude Cepheids ==
Classical Cepheid variables with visual amplitudes below 0.5 magnitudes, almost symmetrical sinusoidal light curves, and short periods, have been defined as a separate group called small amplitude Cepheids. They receive the acronym DCEPS in the GCVS. Periods are generally less than 7 days, although the exact cutoff is still debated. The term s-Cepheid is used for short period small amplitude Cepheids with sinusoidal light curves that are considered to be first overtone pulsators. They are found near the red edge of the instability strip. Some authors use s-Cepheid as a synonym for the small amplitude DCEPS stars, while others prefer to restrict it only to first overtone stars.

Small amplitude Cepheids (DCEPS) include Polaris and FF Aquilae, although both may be pulsating in the fundamental mode. Confirmed first overtone pulsators include BG Crucis and BP Circini.

== Uncertainties in Cepheid determined distances ==
Chief among the uncertainties tied to the Cepheid distance scale are: the nature of the period–luminosity relation in various passbands, the impact of metallicity on both the zero-point and slope of those relations, and the effects of photometric contamination (blending) and a changing (typically unknown) extinction law on classical Cepheid distances. All these topics are actively debated in the literature.

These unresolved matters have resulted in cited values for the Hubble constant ranging between 60 km/s/Mpc and 80 km/s/Mpc. Resolving this discrepancy is one of the foremost problems in astronomy since the cosmological parameters of the Universe may be constrained by supplying a precise value of the Hubble constant.

== Examples ==
Several classical Cepheids have variations that can be recorded with night-by-night, trained naked eye observation, including the prototype Delta Cephei in the far north, Zeta Geminorum and Eta Aquilae ideal for observation near the tropics (near the ecliptic and thus zodiac) and in the far south Beta Doradus. The closest class member is the North Star (Polaris) whose distance is debated and whose present variability is approximately 0.05 of a magnitude.

| Designation (name) | Constellation | Discovery | Maximum Apparent magnitude (m_{V}) | Minimum Apparent magnitude (m_{V}) | Period (days) | Spectral class | Comment |
|---|---|---|---|---|---|---|---|
| η Aql (Pagru) | Aquila | Edward Pigott, 1784 | 3^{m}.48 | 4^{m}.39 | 07.17664 | F6 Ibv | |
| FF Aql | Aquila | Charles Morse Huffer, 1927 | 5^{m}.18 | 5^{m}.68 | 04.47 | F5Ia-F8Ia | |
| TT Aql | Aquila | | 6^{m}.46 | 7^{m}.7 | 13.7546 | F6-G5 | |
| U Aql | Aquila | | 6^{m}.08 | 6^{m}.86 | 07.02393 | F5I-II-G1 | |
| T Ant | Antlia | | 5^{m}.00 | 5^{m}.82 | 05.898 | G5 | possibly has unseen companion. Previously thought to be a type II Cepheid |
| RT Aur | Auriga | | 5^{m}.00 | 5^{m}.82 | 03.73 | F8Ibv | |
| l Car | Carina | | 3^{m}.28 | 4^{m}.18 | 35.53584 | G5 Iab/Ib | |
| δ Cep | Cepheus | John Goodricke, 1784 | 3^{m}.48 | 4^{m}.37 | 05.36634 | F5Ib-G2Ib | double star, visible in binoculars |
| AX Cir | Circinus | | 5^{m}.65 | 6^{m}.09 | 05.273268 | F2-G2II | spectroscopic binary with 5 M_{☉} B6 companion |
| BP Cir | Circinus | | 7^{m}.31 | 7^{m}.71 | 02.39810 | F2/3II-F6 | spectroscopic binary with 4.7 M_{☉} B6 companion |
| BG Cru | Crux | | 5^{m}.34 | 5^{m}.58 | 03.3428 | F5Ib-G0p | |
| R Cru | Crux | | 6^{m}.40 | 7^{m}.23 | 05.82575 | F7Ib/II | |
| S Cru | Crux | | 6^{m}.22 | 6^{m}.92 | 04.68997 | F6-G1Ib-II | |
| T Cru | Crux | | 6^{m}.32 | 6^{m}.83 | 06.73331 | F6-G2Ib | |
| X Cyg | Cygnus | | 5^{m}.85 | 6^{m}.91 | 16.38633 | G8Ib | |
| SU Cyg | Cygnus | | 6^{m}.44 | 7^{m}.22 | 03.84555 | F2-G0I-II | |
| β Dor | Dorado | | 3^{m}.46 | 4^{m}.08 | 09.8426 | F4-G4Ia-II | |
| ζ Gem (Mekbuda) | Gemini | Julius Schmidt, 1825 | 3^{m}.62 | 4^{m}.18 | 10.15073 | F7Ib to G3Ib | |
| V473 Lyr | Lyra | | 5^{m}.99 | 6^{m}.35 | 01.49078 | F6Ib-II | |
| R Mus | Musca | | 5^{m}.93 | 6^{m}.73 | 07.51 | F7Ib-G2 | |
| S Mus | Musca | | 5^{m}.89 | 6^{m}.49 | 09.66007 | F6Ib-G0 | |
| S Nor | Norma | | 6^{m}.12 | 6^{m}.77 | 09.75411 | F8-G0Ib | brightest member of open cluster NGC 6087 |
| QZ Nor | Norma | | 8^{m}.71 | 9^{m}.03 | 03.786008 | F6I | member of open cluster NGC 6067 |
| V340 Nor | Norma | | 8^{m}.26 | 8^{m}.60 | 11.2888 | G0Ib | member of open cluster NGC 6067 |
| V378 Nor | Norma | | 6^{m}.21 | 6^{m}.23 | 03.5850 | G8Ib | |
| BF Oph | Ophiuchus | | 6^{m}.93 | 7^{m}.71 | 04.06775 | F8-K2 | |
| RS Pup | Puppis | | 6^{m}.52 | 7^{m}.67 | 41.3876 | F8Iab | |
| S Sge | Sagitta | John Ellard Gore, 1885 | 5^{m}.24 | 6^{m}.04 | 08.382086 | F6Ib-G5Ib | |
| U Sgr | Sagittarius (in M25) | | 6^{m}.28 | 7^{m}.15 | 06.74523 | G1Ib | |
| W Sgr | Sagittarius | | 4^{m}.29 | 5^{m}.14 | 07.59503 | F4-G2Ib | Optical double with γ^{2} Sgr |
| X Sgr | Sagittarius | | 4^{m}.20 | 4^{m}.90 | 07.01283 | F5-G2II | |
| V636 Sco | Scorpius | | 6^{m}.40 | 6^{m}.92 | 06.79671 | F7/8Ib/II-G5 | |
| R TrA | Triangulum Australe | | 6^{m}.4 | 6^{m}.9 | 03.389 | F7Ib/II | |
| S TrA | Triangulum Australe | | 6^{m}.1 | 6^{m}.8 | 06.323 | F6II-G2 | |
| α UMi (Polaris) | Ursa Minor | Ejnar Hertzsprung, 1911 | 1^{m}.86 | 2^{m}.13 | 03.9696 | F8Ib or F8II | |
| AH Vel | Vela | | 5^{m}.5 | 5^{m}.89 | 04.227171 | F7Ib-II | |
| S Vul | Vulpecula | | 8^{m}.69 | 9^{m}.42 | 68.464 | G0-K2(M1) | |
| T Vul | Vulpecula | | 5^{m}.41 | 6^{m}.09 | 04.435462 | F5Ib-G0Ib | |
| U Vul | Vulpecula | | 6^{m}.73 | 7^{m}.54 | 07.990676 | F6Iab-G2 | |
| SV Vul | Vulpecula | | 6^{m}.72 | 7^{m}.79 | 44.993 | F7Iab-K0Iab | |
| SU Cas | Cassiopeia | | 5^{m}.88 | 6^{m}.30 | 01.9 | F5II | |

== See also ==
- RR Lyrae variable
- Stellar pulsation
- Type II Cepheid
