= U Vulpeculae =

Variable star in the constellation Vulpecula

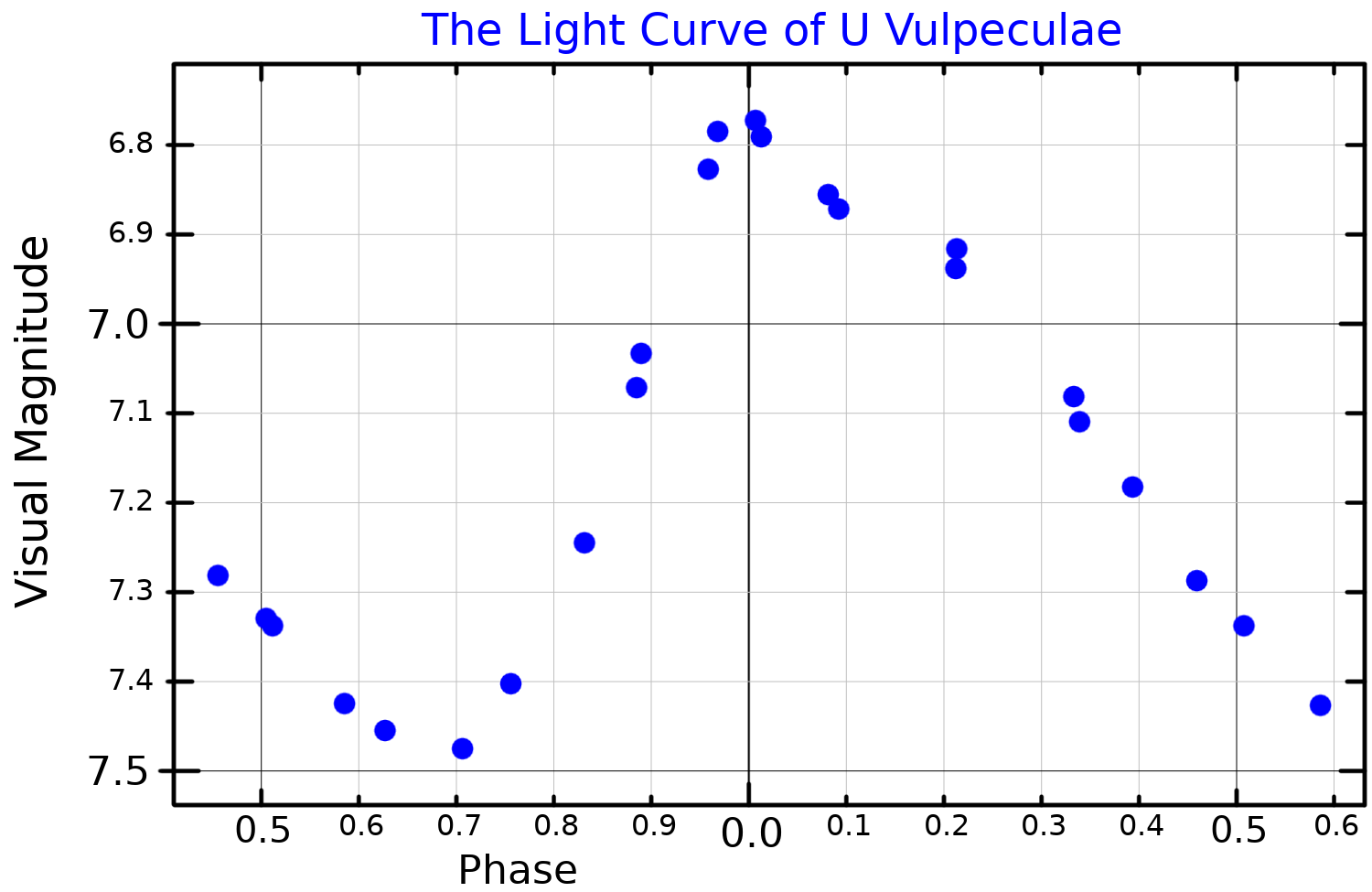
- A visual band light curve for U Vulpeculae, adapted from Kiss (1998)

Observation data Epoch J2000 Equinox J2000
- Constellation: Vulpecula
- Right ascension: 19^{h} 36^{m} 37.7281^{s}
- Declination: +20° 19′ 58.5692″
- Apparent magnitude (V): 6.73 - 7.54

Characteristics
- Spectral type: F6Iab-G2
- Variable type: δ Cep

Astrometry
Proper motion (μ)	RA: 0.906±0.050 mas/yr Dec.: −0.960±0.062 mas/yr
Parallax (π)	1.0530±0.0390 mas
Distance	3,100 ± 100 ly (950 ± 40 pc)
Absolute magnitude (M_{V})	-3.69

Orbit
Period (P)	2,510 days
Eccentricity (e)	0.675
Periastron epoch (T)	2444800
Argument of periastron (ω) (secondary)	353°
Semi-amplitude (K_{1}) (primary)	3.64 km/s

Details
Mass	6.5 M_{☉}
Radius	60 R_{☉}
Surface gravity (log g)	1.75 - 1.85 cgs
Temperature	5,655 - 5,965 K
Metallicity [Fe/H]	0.09 dex
Age	82 Myr

Other designations
- BD+20° 4200, HD 185059, HIP 96458, HR 7458, SAO 87447

Database references
SIMBAD	data

U Vulpeculae is a variable and binary star in the constellation Vulpecula. It is not visible to the naked eye, but can be seen with binoculars.

It is a classical Cepheid variable and its apparent magnitude ranges from 6.73 to 7.54 over a precise cycle of 7.99 days. Its variable nature was discovered in 1898 at Potsdam Observatory by Gustav Müller and Paul Kempf.

In 1991 a study of radial velocities showed that it U Vulpeculae is a spectroscopic binary and a full orbit with a period of 2510 days (6.9 years) was first calculated in 1996. The secondary star is invisible and is only known from its effect on the motion of the primary.
