= S Muscae =

Star in the constellation Musca

- Location of S Muscae (circled)

Observation data Epoch J2000 Equinox ICRS
- Constellation: Musca
- Right ascension: 12^{h} 12^{m} 47.01834^{s}
- Declination: −70° 09′ 06.4363″
- Apparent magnitude (V): 5.89 - 6.49

Characteristics
- Spectral type: F6Ib (F6-G0) + B5V
- U−B color index: +0.66
- B−V color index: +1.00
- Variable type: δ Cepheid

Astrometry
Radial velocity (R_{v})	−1.91 km/s
Proper motion (μ)	RA: −7.79 mas/yr Dec.: −0.60 mas/yr
Parallax (π)	1.99±0.84 mas
Distance	2,798 ± 55 ly (858±17 pc)
Absolute magnitude (M_{V})	−4.01

Orbit
Period (P)	506.3±0.5 days
Semi-major axis (a)	(2.95±0.09)×10^{−3}" (2.53±0.09 AU)
Eccentricity (e)	0.088±0.006
Inclination (i)	144.7±2.8°
Longitude of the node (Ω)	99.6±14.4°
Periastron epoch (T)	2,457,165.9±4.4 JD
Argument of periastron (ω) (secondary)	194.8±3.3°
Semi-amplitude (K_{1}) (primary)	14.85±0.03 km/s
Semi-amplitude (K_{2}) (secondary)	16.63±3.27 km/s

Details

S Mus A
Mass	4.44±0.91 M_{☉}
Radius	65.1 R_{☉}
Luminosity	3,467 L_{☉}
Metallicity	+0.18

S Mus B
Mass	3.98±0.21 M_{☉}
Temperature	17,000 K

Other designations
- S Mus, HR 4645, SAO 251791, CD−69°977, GSC 09231-00752, HD 106111, GC 16679, HIP 59551, AAVSO 1207-69

Database references
SIMBAD	data

S Muscae is a classical (δ) Cepheid variable star in the constellation Musca about 2,800 light years away.

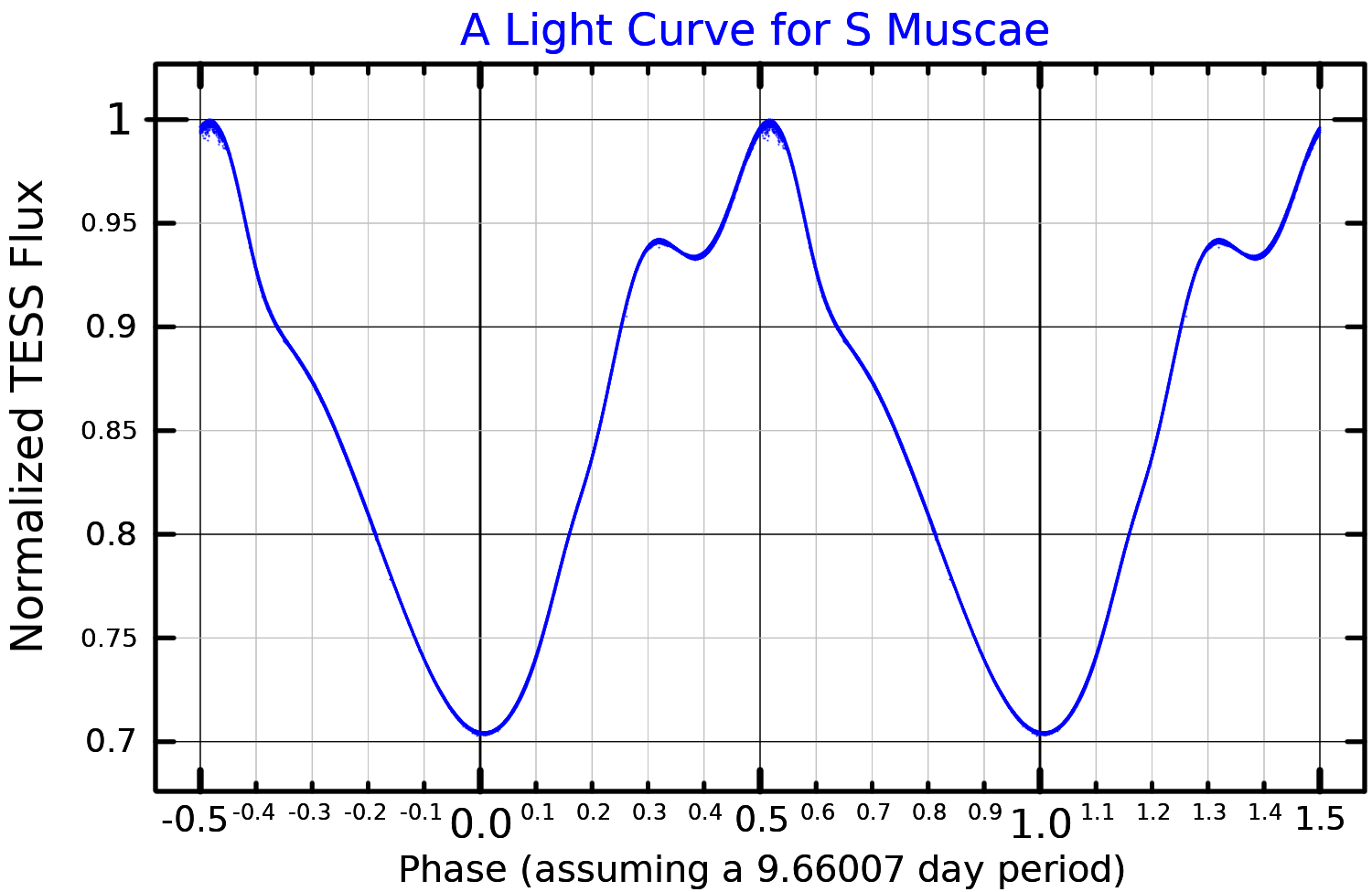
A light curve for S Muscae, plotted from TESS data

S Muscae is a yellow supergiant ranging between spectral types F6Ib and G0Ib and magnitudes 5.89 to 6.49 over a period of 9.66 days. It is a luminous star around six times as massive as the Sun and 65.1 times the radius of the Sun. It is a binary star with a blue-white main sequence star companion likely to be of spectral type B3V to B5V with a mass of just over five solar masses, one of the hottest and brightest companions of a Cepheid known. The two stars orbit each other every 505 days.

S Muscae has been found to lie within the faint star cluster ASCC 69.
