= X Sagittarii =

Variable star and possible binary star system in the constellation Sagittarius

- Location of X Sagittarii (circled)

Observation data Epoch J2000 Equinox ICRS
- Constellation: Sagittarius
- Right ascension: 17^{h} 47^{m} 33.62410^{s}
- Declination: −27° 49′ 50.8490″
- Apparent magnitude (V): 4.54

Characteristics
- Spectral type: F7II
- U−B color index: +0.50
- B−V color index: +0.80
- Variable type: Cepheid

Astrometry
Radial velocity (R_{v})	−10.10 km/s
Proper motion (μ)	RA: −5.097 mas/yr Dec.: −9.722 mas/yr
Parallax (π)	3.4314±0.2020 mas
Distance	950 ± 60 ly (290 ± 20 pc)
Absolute magnitude (M_{V})	−2.85

Details
Mass	6.31 M_{☉}
Radius	53±3 R_{☉}
Luminosity	2,647 L_{☉}
Surface gravity (log g)	1.77 cgs
Temperature	6,305 K
Metallicity [Fe/H]	−0.01 dex
Rotational velocity (v sin i)	27.1 km/s

Other designations
- 3 Sagittarii, X Sgr, CD−27°11930, FK5 1464, GC 24135, HD 161592, HIP 87072, HR 6616, SAO 185755, GSC 06836-00118

Database references
SIMBAD	data

X Sagittarii is a variable star and candidate binary star system in the southern constellation of Sagittarius, near the western constellation boundary with Ophiuchus. It has a yellow-white hue and is visible to the naked eye with an apparent visual magnitude that fluctuates around 4.54. The star is located at a distance of approximately 950 light years from the Sun based on parallax, and is drifting closer with a radial velocity of −10 km/s. The star has an absolute magnitude of around −2.85.

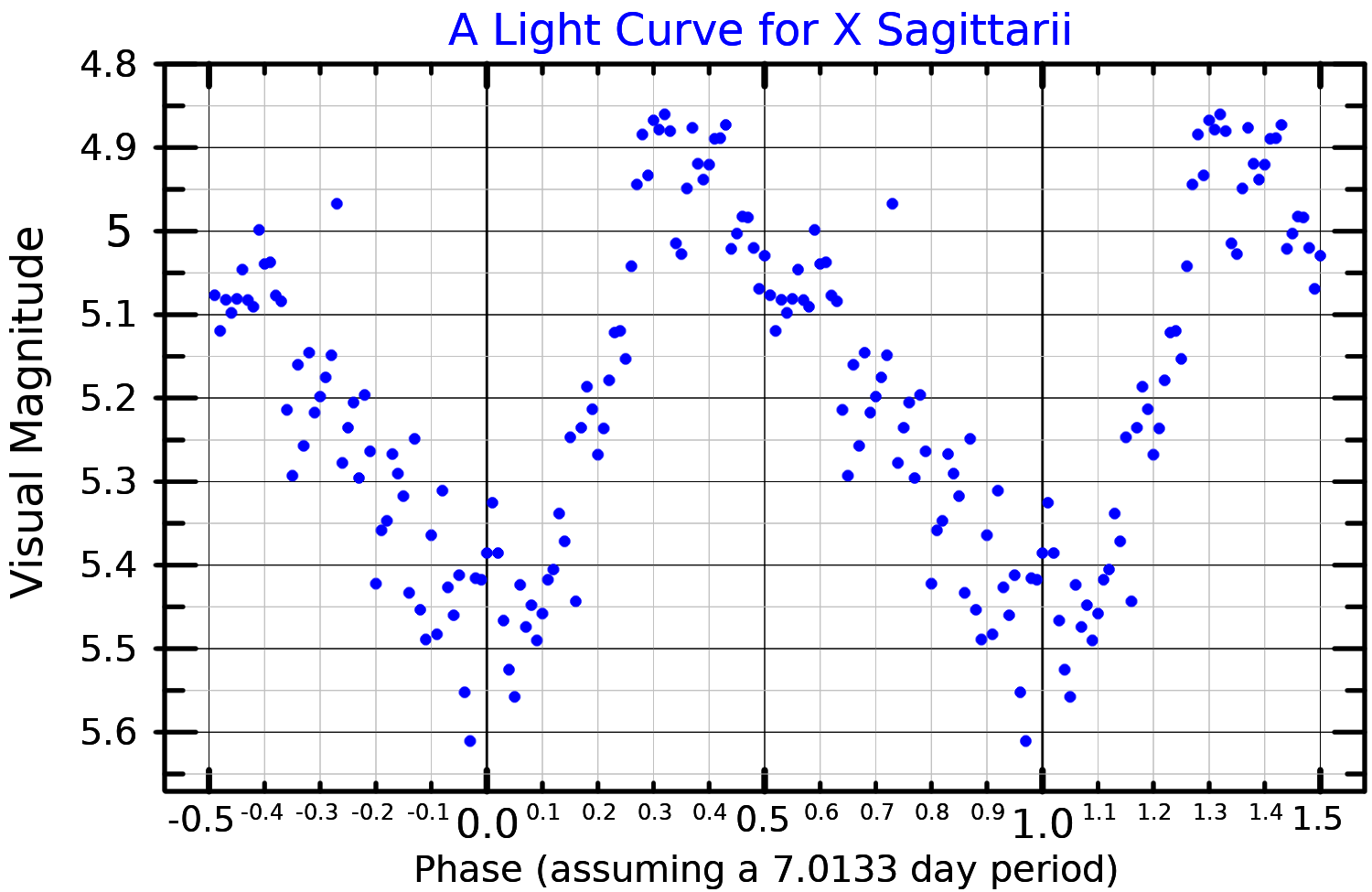
A visual band light curve for X Sagittarii, plotted from ASAS data

On August 4, 1866, Johann Friedrich Julius Schmidt discovered that the star is a variable star. This is an F-type bright giant with a stellar classification of F7II. It is a Classical Cepheid variable that ranges in apparent magnitude from 4.20 down to 4.90 with a period of 7.01283 days. Its variation in brightness is accompanied by a change in spectral classification, from G2 to F5. The amplitude of each pulsation causes the stellar radius to vary by ~9%. Analysis of the spectra suggest there are two shock waves per pulsation period, with complicated patterns appearing in the metallic lines. The star is surrounded by an optically-thin circumstellar envelope at 15–20 stellar radii, which appears as an infrared excess of 13.3%. This may be composed of amorphous carbon.

László Szabados suggested in 1990 that this might be a binary system with a period of 507 days. A detection of this projected companion was reported in 2013 using the VLTI/AMBER instrument. However, the object was at the detection limit of the instrument, showing an angular separation of 10.7 mas from the primary and a magnitude difference of 5.6 in the K-band. A subsequent optical search reported a failure to detect the companion in 2014, excluding companions brighter than a A-type main-sequence star class of A9V. The estimated mass of this object is 0.2–0.3 M_{☉}.
