= U Aquilae =

Variable binary star system in the constellation Aquila

- Location of U Aquilae (circled in red)

Observation data Epoch J2000 Equinox ICRS
- Constellation: Aquila
- Right ascension: 19^{h} 29^{m} 21.3603^{s}
- Declination: −07° 02′ 38.710″
- Apparent magnitude (V): 6.08 - 6.86

Characteristics
- Spectral type: F5-G1 I-II + B9.8V
- U−B color index: 0.70
- B−V color index: 1.10
- Variable type: δ Cep

Astrometry
Radial velocity (R_{v})	−6.5 km/s
Proper motion (μ)	RA: −0.99 mas/yr Dec.: −9.14 mas/yr
Parallax (π)	3.63±0.96 mas
Distance	1,931 ± 62 ly (592±19 pc)
Absolute magnitude (M_{V})	−3.68

Orbit
Primary	Aa
Secondary	Ab
Period (P)	1,831.4±6.5 days
Semi-major axis (a)	(10.06±0.16)×10^{−3}" (5.94±0.22 AU)
Eccentricity (e)	0.193±0.005
Inclination (i)	115.4±0.7°
Longitude of the node (Ω)	133.8±4.4°
Periastron epoch (T)	2,457,575.3±8.4 JD
Argument of periastron (ω) (secondary)	167.1±1.9°
Semi-amplitude (K_{1}) (primary)	8.41±0.04 km/s
Semi-amplitude (K_{2}) (secondary)	24.05±1.24 km/s

Details

Aa
Mass	6.2±0.8 M_{☉}
Radius	55 R_{☉}
Luminosity	2,570 L_{☉}
Surface gravity (log g)	1.3 cgs
Temperature	5,440-6,640 K
Metallicity [Fe/H]	0.17 dex

Ab
Mass	2.2±0.2 M_{☉}
Radius	2.1 R_{☉}
Temperature	9,300 K

Other designations
- U Aql, AAVSO 1924-07, BD−07°4968, GC 26905, HD 183344, HIP 95820, HR 7402, SAO 143454, ADS 12503, CCDM J19294-0703

Database references
SIMBAD	data

U Aquilae is a binary star system in the constellation Aquila, Located approximately 592 parsecs (1,930 ly) away from Earth.

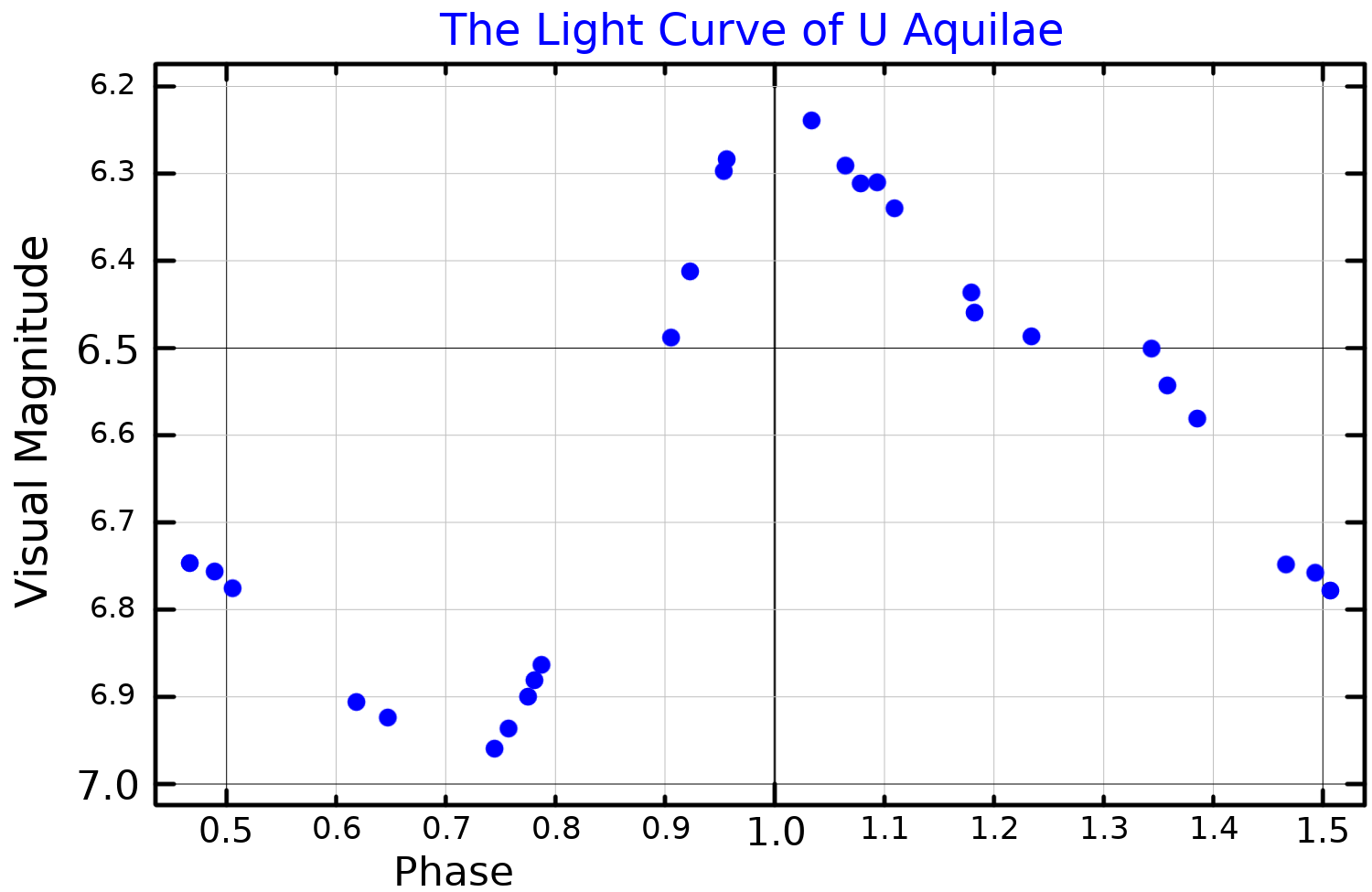
A visual band light curve for U Aquilae, adapted from Kiss (1998)

U Aquilae is a spectroscopic binary. The primary star is a yellow supergiant with a radius of 55 R_{☉} and a luminosity of 2,570 L_{☉}. The secondary is a blue main-sequence star, twice the mass of the sun and around thirty times more luminous. It is hotter than the primary star at 9,300 K, but much smaller and fainter. The two stars orbit every five years and their separation varies from five to seven astronomical units in a mildly eccentric orbit. An 11th-magnitude star 1.6″ from the spectroscopic pair, is assumed to be related but would have an orbit of several thousand years.

Discovery of the variability of U Aquilae was announced by Edwin Forrest Sawyer in 1886. In his announcement, he called the star 50 Aquilae, which is its designation in Uranometria Argentina. Sawyer had begun observing the star in late 1882, and had derived a period of "about one week". It was listed with its variable star designation, U Aquilae, in Annie Jump Cannon's 1907 Second Catalogue of Variable Stars.

U Aquilae Aa is a classical Cepheid variable star, ranging between magnitudes 6.08 and 6.86 over a period of 7.02 days. It is an evolved star which has exhausted its core hydrogen and is now fusing helium into carbon.
