= AH Velorum =

Yellow-white hued star in the constellation Vela

Observation data Epoch J2000 Equinox ICRS
- Constellation: Vela
- Right ascension: 08^{h} 11^{m} 59.96702^{s}
- Declination: −46° 38′ 39.6561″
- Apparent magnitude (V): 5.70 (5.50 – 5.89)

Characteristics
- Spectral type: F7 Ib-II
- B−V color index: 0.59
- Variable type: δ Cep

Astrometry
Radial velocity (R_{v})	+26.0±2.9 km/s
Proper motion (μ)	RA: −4.405 mas/yr Dec.: +6.768 mas/yr
Parallax (π)	1.2170±0.0570 mas
Distance	2,700 ± 100 ly (820 ± 40 pc)
Absolute magnitude (M_{V})	−2.52

Details
Mass	7.0±0.5 M_{☉}
Luminosity	929.98 L_{☉}
Surface gravity (log g)	1.66 cgs
Temperature	6,102 K
Metallicity [Fe/H]	+0.09 dex
Rotational velocity (v sin i)	10.0±0.5 km/s
Age	50.0±11.0 Myr

Other designations
- CD−46°3902, HD 68808, HIP 40155, HR 3232, SAO 219587

Database references
SIMBAD	data

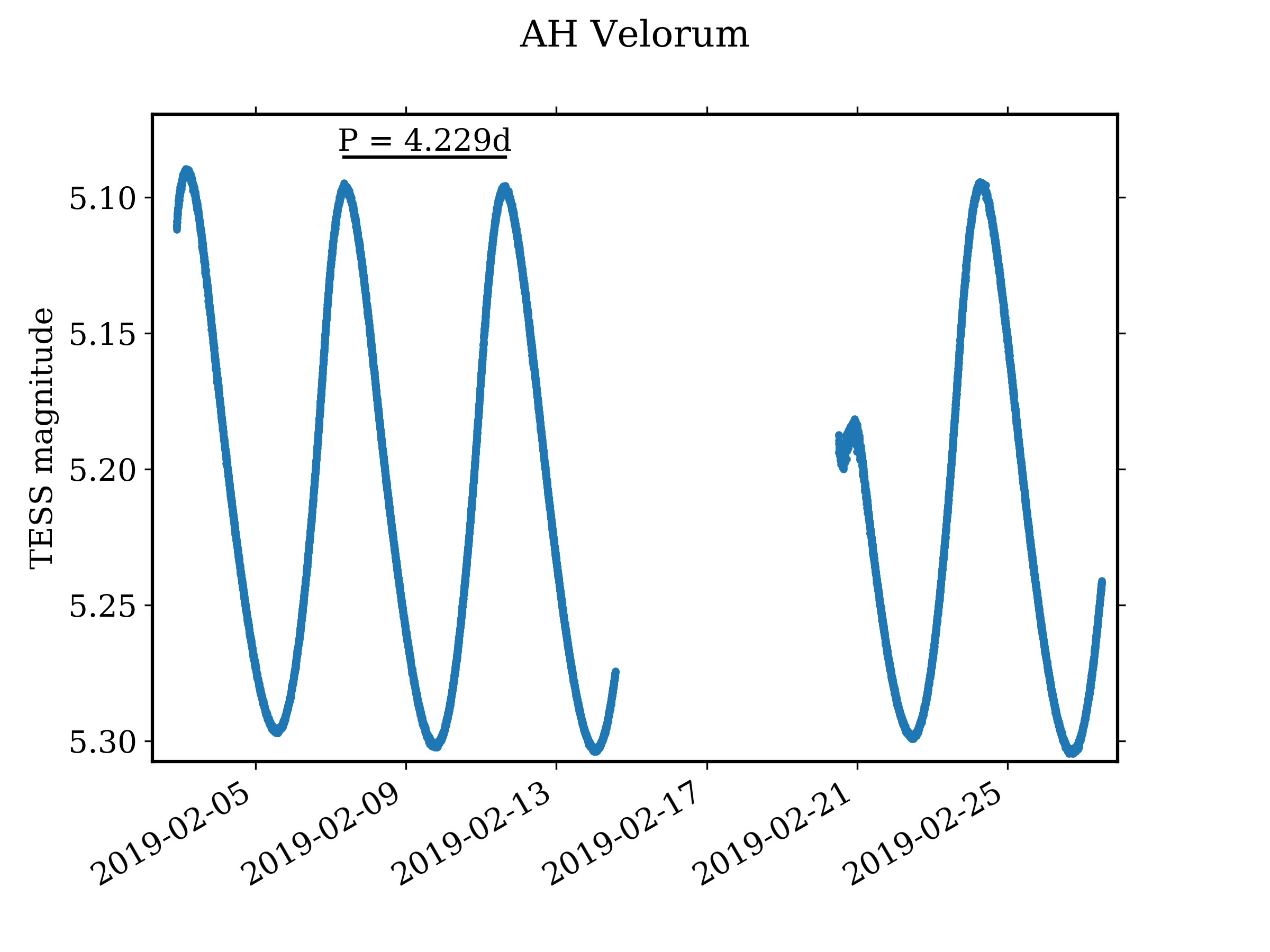
Light curve of the classical Cepheid variable AH Velorum recorded by NASA's Transiting Exoplanet Survey Satellite (TESS)

AH Velorum is a single, yellow-white hued star in the constellation Vela. It has an average apparent visual magnitude of 5.70, which makes it bright enough to be dimly visible to the naked eye in good seeing conditions. The distance to this star can be estimated from its annual parallax shift of 1.217 mas, which yields a separation of roughly 2,700 light years. It is moving further away from the Earth with a heliocentric radial velocity of +26 km/s.

It is a bright giant/supergiant of spectral type F7 Ib-II. The star is around 50 million years old with a projected rotational velocity of 10 km/s. It has 7 times the mass of the Sun and is radiating 930 times the Sun's luminosity from its photosphere at an effective temperature of 6,102 K.

A classical Cepheid variable, its apparent magnitude ranges from 5.50 to 5.89 over 4.227171 days. It pulsates in the first overtone, with a fundamental period of 6.04 days.
