= T Vulpeculae =

Variable star in the constellation Vulpecula

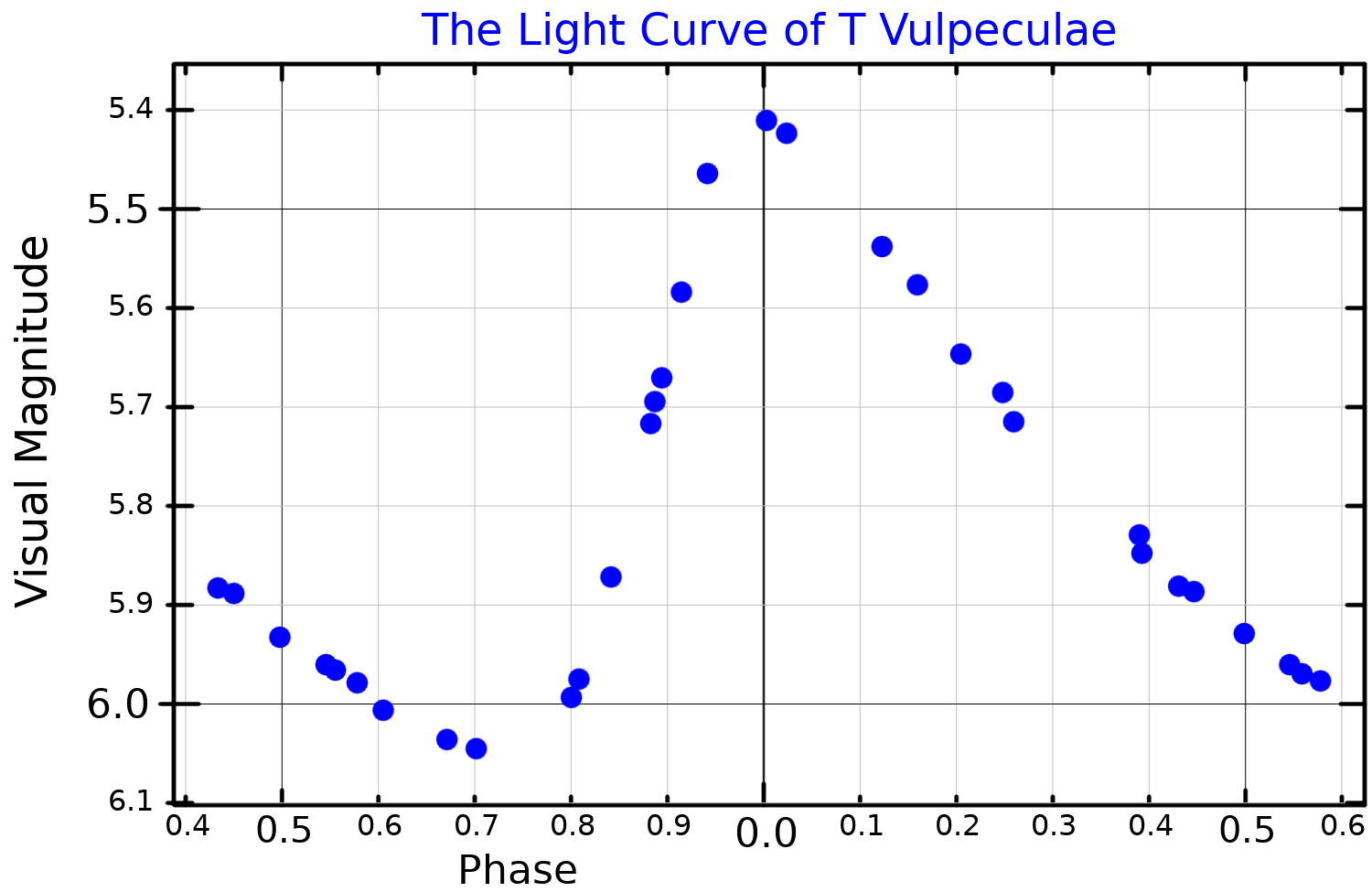
- A visual band light curve for T Vulpeculae, adapted from Kiss (1998)

Observation data Epoch J2000 Equinox ICRS
- Constellation: Vulpecula
- Right ascension: 20^{h} 51^{m} 28.23825^{s}
- Declination: +28° 15′ 01.8166″
- Apparent magnitude (V): 5.754 (5.41 – 6.09)

Characteristics
- Spectral type: F5 Ib + A0.8 V
- B−V color index: +0.616±0.049
- Variable type: δ Cep

Astrometry
Radial velocity (R_{v})	−2.6±0.6 km/s
Proper motion (μ)	RA: +3.496 mas/yr Dec.: −15.087 mas/yr
Parallax (π)	1.6738±0.0891 mas
Distance	1,900 ± 100 ly (600 ± 30 pc)
Absolute magnitude (M_{V})	−3.19

Details

T Vul A
Mass	4.9 M_{☉}
Radius	35.6±4.4 R_{☉}
Luminosity	1,620 L_{☉}
Surface gravity (log g)	1.75 cgs
Temperature	6,220 K
Metallicity [Fe/H]	0.01 dex
Age	120 Myr

T Vul B
Mass	2.1 M_{☉}

Other designations
- T Vul, AAVSO 2047+27, BD+27° 3890, HD 198726, HIP 102949, HR 7988, SAO 89216

Database references
SIMBAD	data

T Vulpeculae is a possible binary star system in the northern constellation of Vulpecula, near the star Zeta Cygni, close to the pair 31 Vulpeculae and 32 Vulpeculae. It is visible to the naked eye with an apparent visual magnitude that ranges around 5.75. The distance to this system is around 1,900 light years, as determined from its annual parallax shift of 1.67 mas.

A well-studied Classical Cepheid variable and one of the brightest known, the apparent magnitude of T Vulpeculae ranges from 5.41 to 6.09 over a period of 4.435 days. It is a yellow-white hued supergiant of spectral type F5 Ib. The variability of T Vul was discovered in 1885 by Edwin Sawyer. Observations between 1885 and 2003 shows a small but continuous decrease in the period of variability amounting to 0.25 seconds per year.

The companion star was detected in 1992; it is an A-type main-sequence star with a class of A0.8 V and 2.1 times the Sun's mass. Orbital periods of 738 and 1,745 days have been proposed for the pair, although, as of 2015, there remains doubt as to whether this is an actual binary system.
