= L Carinae =

The Bayer designations l Carinae and L Carinae are distinct.

- for l Carinae, see HD 84810
- for L Carinae, see HD 90264

== See also ==
- I Carinae
- i Carinae
- ι Carinae
