= RT Aurigae =

Star in the constellation Auriga

- Location of RT Aur (circled)

Observation data Epoch J2000 Equinox ICRS
- Constellation: Auriga
- Right ascension: 06^{h} 28^{m} 34.08818^{s}
- Declination: +30° 29′ 34.9296″
- Apparent magnitude (V): 5.75 (5.00 - 5.82)

Characteristics
- Spectral type: F8Ib (F4Ib - G4Ib)
- Apparent magnitude (G): 5.3
- U−B color index: 0.5
- B−V color index: 0.74
- Variable type: δ Cep

Astrometry
Radial velocity (R_{v})	5.42±4.77 km/s
Proper motion (μ)	RA: −0.492±0.137 mas/yr Dec.: −13.441±0.100 mas/yr
Parallax (π)	1.8153±0.1222 mas
Distance	1,540 ly (473 pc)
Absolute magnitude (M_{V})	−3.09

Details
Mass	4.4 M_{☉}
Radius	35±1 R_{☉}
Luminosity	1,451±124 L_{☉}
Surface gravity (log g)	1.42 cgs
Temperature	6,034±66 K
Metallicity	0.1
Rotational velocity (v sin i)	8.8 km/s
Age	85 Myr

Other designations
- 48 Aurigae, HD 45412, BD+30°1238, HIP 30827, SAO 59128, HR 2332

Database references
SIMBAD	data

Data sources:

Hipparcos Catalogue, CCDM (2002), Bright Star Catalogue (5th rev. ed.)

RT Aurigae (RT Aur, 48 Aurigae) is a yellow supergiant variable star in the constellation Auriga, about 1,500 light years from Earth. Although its brightness is variable, it is consistently visible to the naked eye under good observing conditions.

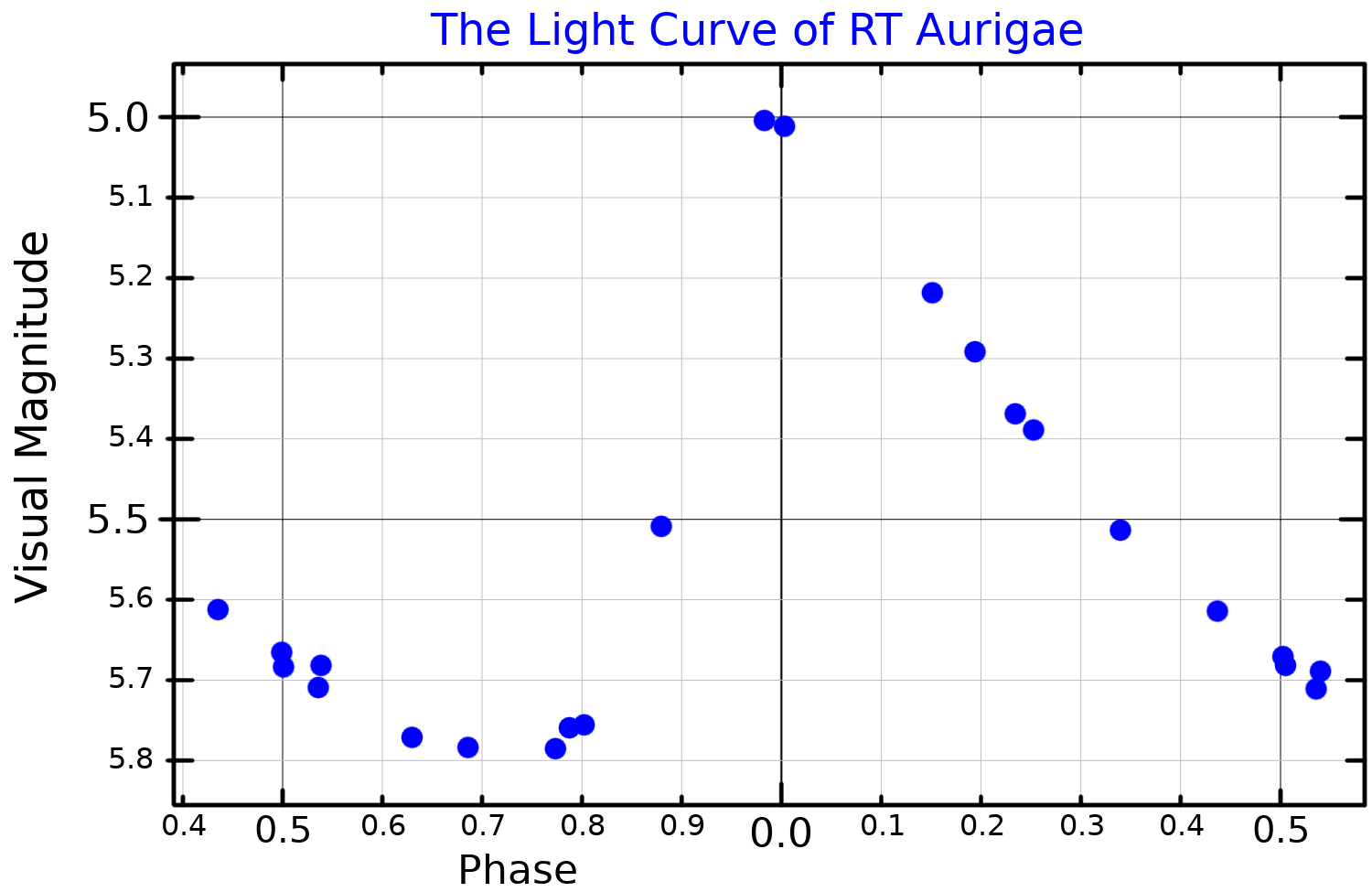
A visual band light curve for RT Aurigae, adapted from Kiss (1998)

RT Aurigae is an F to G type Classical Cepheid variable which varies from magnitude +5.00 to +5.82 with a period of 3.728309 days. The variability was discovered in 1905, by an English schoolmaster and amateur astronomer, Thomas Hinsley Astbury. It was quickly recognised as a member of the class of Cepheid variables, but their nature was not understood at that time. Radial velocity changes were detected corresponding to the brightness variations, but the idea that these were caused by stellar pulsations and temperature changes was largely dismissed in favour of orbital motions of a binary star. More accurate observations eventually proved beyond doubt that the brightness variations were caused by pulsations in the atmospheres of the stars, with the stars being smallest and hottest near maximum brightness.

RT Aurigae has been suspected to be a spectroscopic binary system, but this has not been confirmed. The strongest evidence was found in 2013 using CHARA array optical interferometry. The companion would be 6.7 magnitudes fainter than the supergiant primary, cooler and fainter than an F0 main sequence star. The two stars are separated by 2.1 milli-arc seconds.
