= SU Cygni =

Variable star system in the constellation Cygnus

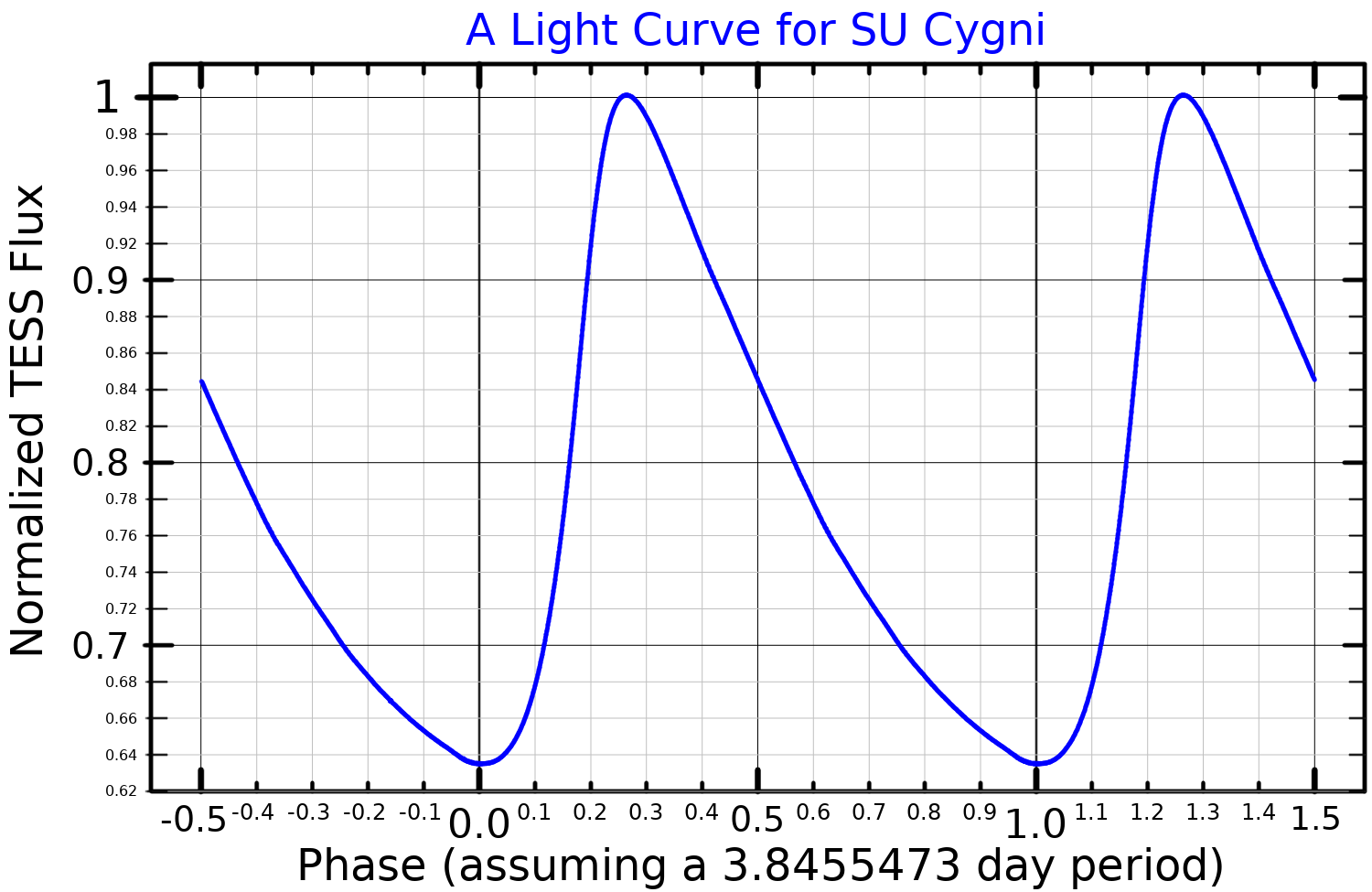
- A light curve for SU Cygni, plotted from TESS data

Observation data Epoch J2000 Equinox ICRS
- Constellation: Cygnus
- Right ascension: 19^{h} 44^{m} 48.734^{s}
- Declination: +29° 15′ 52.90″
- Apparent magnitude (V): 6.44 to 7.22

Characteristics
- Spectral type: F2Iab: + B8.0V + A0V:
- Variable type: δ Cep

Astrometry
Radial velocity (R_{v})	−21.5±2.4 km/s
Proper motion (μ)	RA: 0.107 mas/yr Dec.: −3.247 mas/yr
Parallax (π)	1.080±0.006 mas
Distance	3,021 ± 16 ly (926.3±5.0 pc)

Orbit
Primary	SU Cyg A
Name	SU Cyg B
Period (P)	549.077±0.013 d
Semi-major axis (a)	2.827±0.009 AU
Eccentricity (e)	0.339±0.002
Inclination (i)	81.28±0.27°
Longitude of the node (Ω)	266.24±0.24°
Periastron epoch (T)	2,443,765.94±0.63 HJD
Argument of periastron (ω) (secondary)	223.18±2.12°
Semi-amplitude (K_{1}) (primary)	30.25±0.05 km/s
Semi-amplitude (K_{2}) (secondary)	28.59±0.15 km/s

Orbit
Primary	SU Cyg Ba
Name	SU Cyg Bb
Period (P)	4.67529(1) d
Semi-major axis (a)	≥0.0287±0.0001
Periastron epoch (T)	2,456,977.994±0.003 HJD
Semi-amplitude (K_{1}) (primary)	66.89±0.21 km/s

Details

Aa
Mass	4.859±0.058 M_{☉}
Radius	31.9±6.0 R_{☉}
Luminosity	2,138±109 L_{☉}
Surface gravity (log g)	2.1–2.4 cgs
Temperature	5,956 to 6,314 K
Metallicity [Fe/H]	−0.03±0.04 dex

Ba
Mass	3.595±0.033 M_{☉}

Bb
Mass	1.546±0.009 M_{☉}

Other designations
- SU Cyg, BD+28°3460, GC 27336, HD 186688, HIP 97150, HR 7518, SAO 87659, PPM 109630, WDS J19448+2916Aa,Ab

Database references
SIMBAD	data

SU Cygni is a triple star system in the northern constellation of Cygnus, abbreviated SU Cyg. The primary component of the system is a classical Cepheid variable with a period of 3.84559 days. The changing luminosity of this star causes the system to vary in brightness from a peak apparent visual magnitude of 6.44 down to magnitude 7.22 over the course of its cycle. The distance to this system is approximately 3,000 light years based on parallax measurements, and is the most accurate distance among Cepheids. It is a member of the Turner 9 open cluster of stars.

The variable luminosity of this star was announced by G. Müller and P. Kempf in 1898. The following year, M. Luizet determined a period of 3.846 days. In 1906, the radial velocity of this star was found to be variable by J. D. Maddrill, with its cycle matching the luminosity period but trailing in phase by half a day. By 1916 it was classified as a Cepheid variable, with spectrographic studies showing that the spectral type varied over the course of each cycle. It ranged from a class of A6 near peak luminosity down to F7 at minimum.

A companion star, designated component B, was detected photometrically by B. F. Madore in 1977, with the colors suggesting a B-type main-sequence star with a class of B6–7V. This finding was supported by observations of J. D. Fernie in 1979, who determined a class of B6V. In 1984, M. Imbert measured an orbital period of 549.2 days for the pair, with an orbital eccentricity (ovalness) of 0.35. Ultraviolet observations with the IUE spacecraft in 1985 showed that the companion is a close binary system with a period of 4.7 days. The members of this pair have classes of B8 and A0. In 1998, the B-type companion was found to be a chemically peculiar HgMn star.

There is a candidate comoving companion star located at an angular separation of 24″ to the west of SU Cyg. It is an A-type main-sequence star with a class of A2V. This star does not appear to be gravitationally bound to SU Cyg.
