= S Vulpeculae =

Star in the constellation Vulpecula

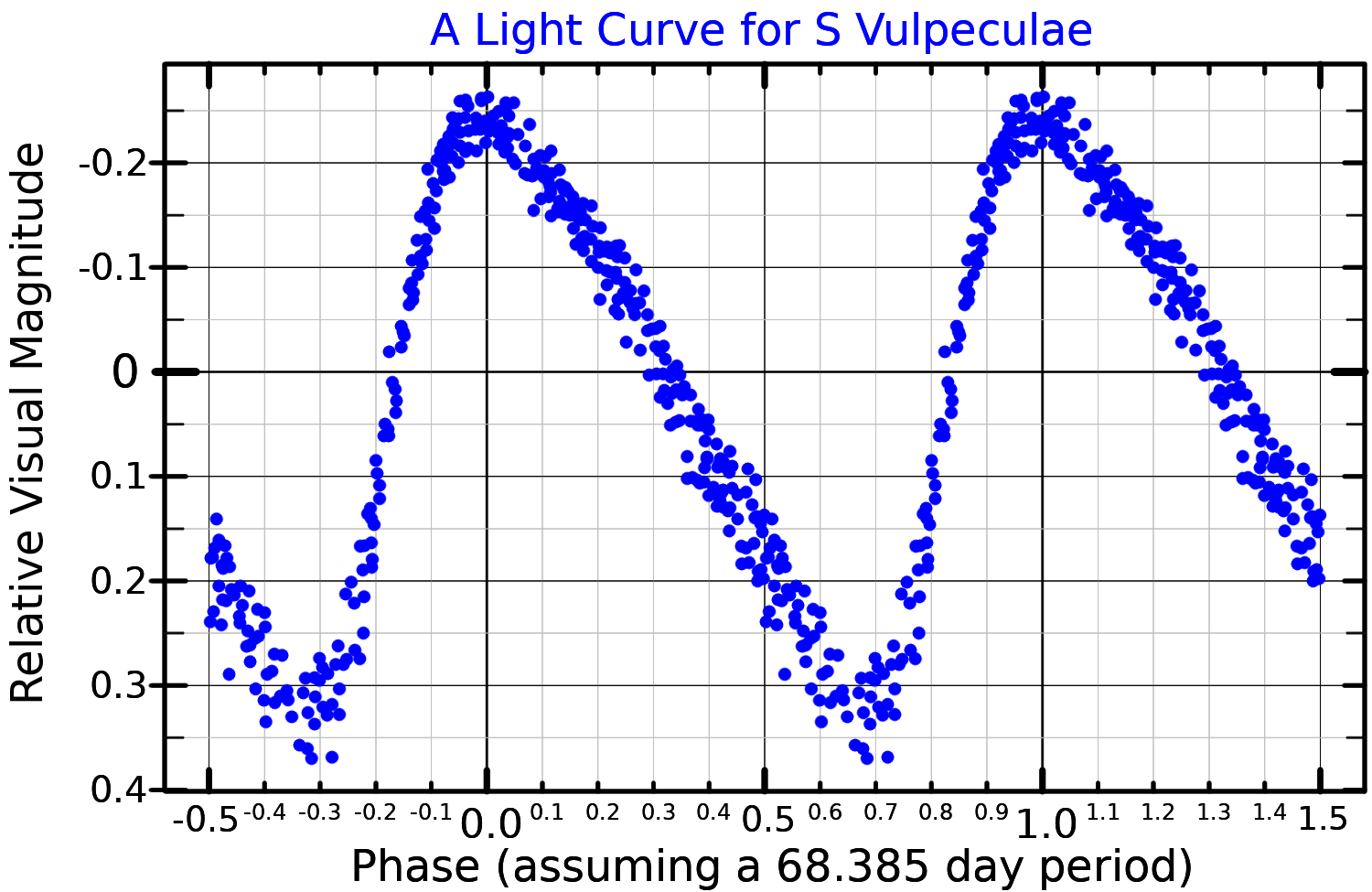
- A visual band light curve for S Vulpeculae, adapted from Heiser (1996)

Observation data Epoch J2000 Equinox ICRS
- Constellation: Vulpecula
- Right ascension: 19^{h} 48^{m} 23.8064^{s}
- Declination: 27° 17′ 11.4265″
- Apparent magnitude (V): 8.974 (8.69 - 9.42)

Characteristics
- Spectral type: G0-K2(M1)
- U−B color index: +1.3 - +2.0
- B−V color index: +1.7 - +2.1
- Variable type: δ Cep

Astrometry
| Radial velocity (R_{v}) | 0.0 ± 2 km/s |
| Proper motion (μ) | RA: −3.401±0.058 mas/yr Dec.: −5.923±0.059 mas/yr |
| Parallax (π) | 0.3050±0.0406 mas |
| Distance | approx. 11,000 ly (approx. 3,300 pc) |
| Absolute magnitude (M_{V}) | −6.08 |

Details
| Mass | 14.2 M_{☉} |
| Radius | 286±7 R_{☉} |
| Luminosity | 67,800±3,900 L_{☉} |
| Temperature | 5,512±45 K |
| Metallicity [Fe/H] | −0.01 dex |
| Age | 12.6 Myr |

Other designations
- S Vulpeculae, SAO 87743, HD 338867, BD+26°3674, AAVSO 1944+27

Database references
| SIMBAD | data |

S Vulpeculae is a variable star located in the constellation Vulpecula.

John Russell Hind announced that the star's brightness varies, in 1861. In 1862, Joseph Baxendell showed that the star is a periodic variable. It appears with its variable star designation in Annie Jump Cannon's 1907 work Second Catalogue of Variable Stars. A pulsating variable that grows and shrinks as it changes in brightness, S Vulpeculae has been variously classified as an RV Tauri variable, a semiregular variable star, or a Cepheid variable.

S Vulpeculae is now confirmed as a classical Cepheid variable with one of the longest known periods at 68 days, although the period has changed several times. As such, it is also one of the cooler and more luminous of the Cepheids, and it lies close to the zone where semiregular variable stars are found. The shape and amplitude of the light curve varies significantly from cycle to cycle and secularly. The apparent magnitude ranges from 8.69 to 9.42. The spectrum varies from early G to late K as it pulsates, with TiO bands typical of an M1 star when the star is coolest.
