= FF Aquilae =

Star and possible star system in the constellation Aquila

- Location of FF Aquilae (circled)

Observation data Epoch J2000 Equinox ICRS
- Constellation: Aquila
- Right ascension: 18^{h} 58^{m} 14.74830^{s}
- Declination: +17° 21′ 39.2976″
- Apparent magnitude (V): 5.18 - 5.51

Characteristics
- Spectral type: F6Ib
- U−B color index: 0.43
- B−V color index: 0.8
- Variable type: δ Cep

Astrometry
Radial velocity (R_{v})	−15.47±1.61 km/s
Proper motion (μ)	RA: −1.151 mas/yr Dec.: −9.823 mas/yr
Parallax (π)	1.9057±0.0712 mas
Distance	1,710 ± 60 ly (520 ± 20 pc)
Absolute magnitude (M_{V})	−3.4

Details
Mass	3.2 M_{☉}
Radius	39 R_{☉}
Luminosity	2,238 L_{☉}
Surface gravity (log g)	1.28 cgs
Temperature	6,195 K
Metallicity [Fe/H]	+0.04 dex
Rotational velocity (v sin i)	10.0 km/s
Age	60 Myr

Other designations
- FF Aql, HD 176155, HIP 93124, BD+17°3799, HR 7165, SAO 104296.

Database references
SIMBAD	data

FF Aquilae is a classical Cepheid variable star located in the constellation Aquila, close to the border with Hercules. It ranges from apparent magnitude 5.18 to 5.51 over a period of 4.47 days, meaning it is faintly visible to the unaided eye in rural or suburban settings.

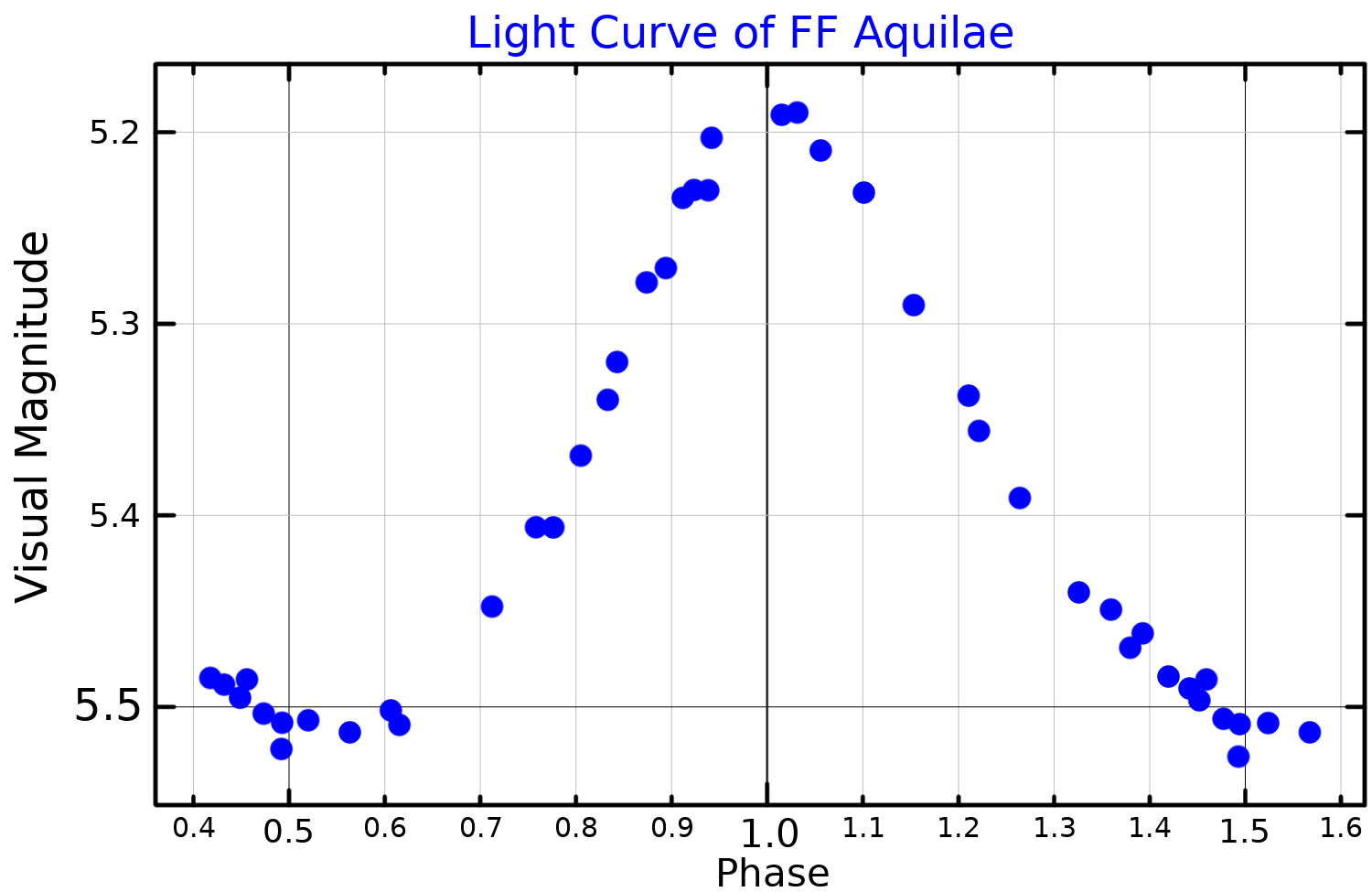
The visual band light curve of FF Aquilae, adapted from Kiss (1998)

Originally known as HR 7165, it was noted to be variable by Charles Morse Huffer in August 1927, who observed its Cepheid pattern. It then received the variable star designation FF Aquilae. Analysis of its brightness over 122 years shows that its period is increasing by 0.072±0.011 seconds per year. It is a small amplitude classical Cepheid, and as such is expected to be a supergiant near the red edge of the instability strip.

A yellow supergiant, FF Aqlilae pulsates with varying temperature, diameter, and luminosity. It has been estimated to be 1,710 ± 60 light-years (520 ± 20 parsecs) distant from Earth by extrapolating from its angular diameter and estimated radius.

FF Aquilae is a possible quadruple star system. Analysis of its spectrum shows that it is a spectroscopic binary system with the fainter companion calculated to be a main sequence star of spectral type A9V to F3V, orbiting every 3.92 years. A third star, revealed by speckle interferometry, is likely to be a cooler star that has evolved off the main sequence. A fourth star, that is of magnitude 11.4 and located 6 arcseconds away, is a somewhat evolved star slightly hotter, larger, and more luminous than the Sun. Several studies found it unlikely to be a member of the system, although Gaia Data Release 3 finds it to be at a similar distance and with a similar proper motion.
