= T Antliae =

Variable star in the constellation Antlia

Observation data Epoch J2000 Equinox J2000
- Constellation: Antlia
- Right ascension: 09^{h} 33^{m} 50.85957^{s}
- Declination: −36° 36′ 56.7423″
- Apparent magnitude (V): 8.86 - 9.76

Characteristics
- Spectral type: F6Iab-G5
- Variable type: δ Cep

Astrometry
Radial velocity (R_{v})	27.51±4.45 km/s
Proper motion (μ)	RA: -6.969 mas/yr Dec.: +5.850 mas/yr
Parallax (π)	0.2924±0.0286 mas
Distance	11,000 ± 1,000 ly (3,400 ± 300 pc)
Absolute magnitude (M_{V})	−3.42

Details
Radius	52 R_{☉}
Luminosity	1,889 L_{☉}
Surface gravity (log g)	2.1 cgs
Temperature	5,286 K
Metallicity [Fe/H]	−0.24 dex
Age	100 Myr

Other designations
- T Ant, HIP 46924, SAO 200500, CD−36°5776

Database references
SIMBAD	data

T Antliae (also abbreviated T Ant) is a Classical Cepheid variable star that is between 10 and 12,000 light-years away from the Sun in the constellation of Antlia. A yellow-white supergiant with a spectral type of F6Iab, it ranges between apparent magnitude 8.86 and 9.76 over a period of 5.89820 days.

== Variability ==
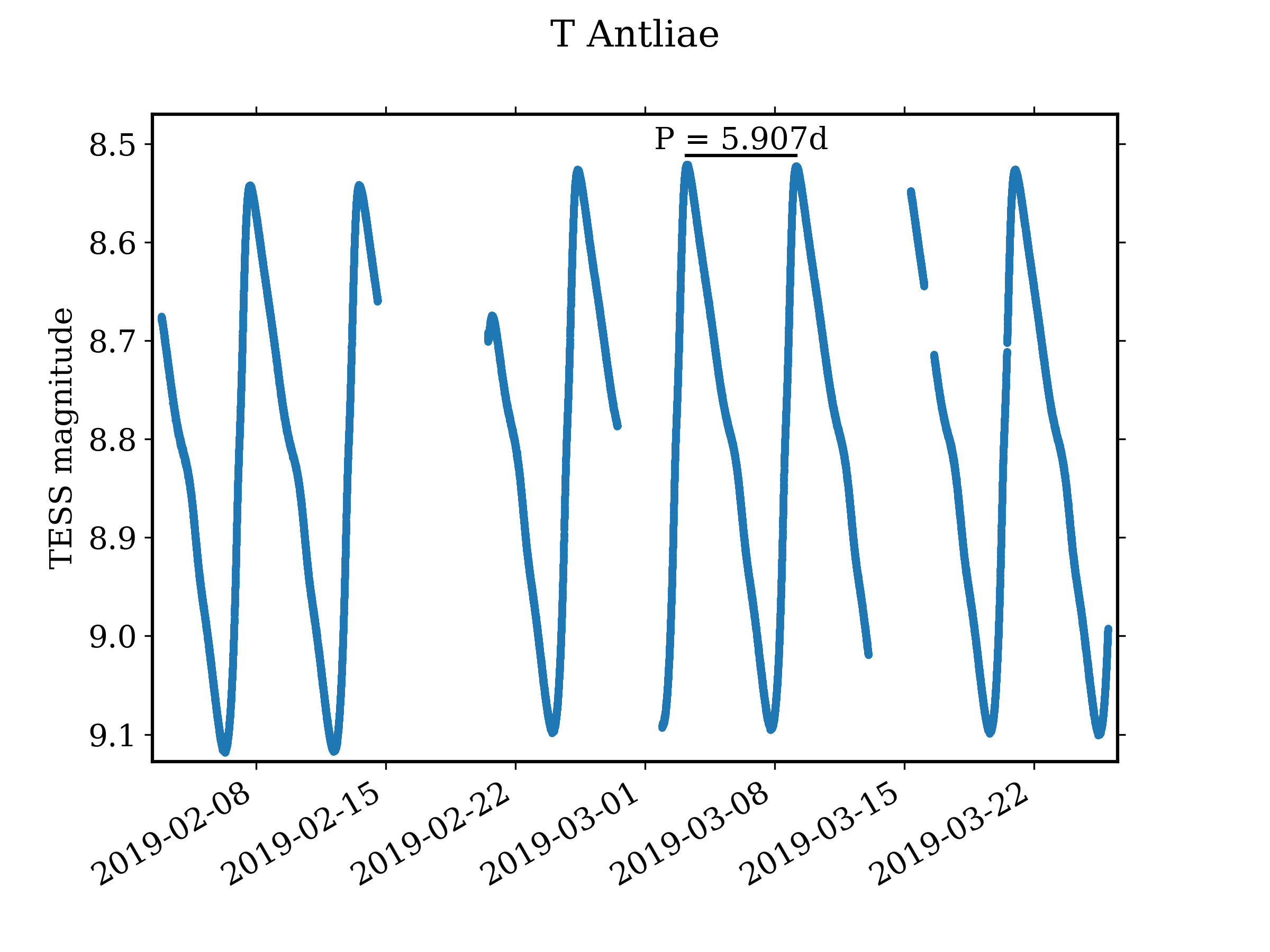
Light curve of T Antliae recorded by NASA's Transiting Exoplanet Survey Satellite (TESS)

T Antliae varies in brightness regularly every 5.89820 days. The light curve is extremely consistent and shows a rapid rise taking 23% of the period, with a slower decline. The maximum brightness of apparent magnitude 8.86 and the minimum of 9.76 are also extremely consistent.

The amplitude, light curve shape, period, and consistency, all mark T Antliae as a Cepheid variable. However, the exact sub-type has been debated. It has been considered a type II Cepheid, and old population II star, but is now thought to be a younger more massive Classical Cepheid variable, also known as a δ Cepheid.

The period has been calculated to be increasing by about half a second per year. The increasing period implies that the effective temperature of T Antliae is decreasing, something that would happen both during the initial crossing of the instability strip after a star has left the main sequence, and again following a blue loop. The first crossing of the instability strip is very rapid and T Antliae is judged to be crossing it for the third time (the second time occurs with increasing temperature at the start of the blue loop).

The brightness changes of Cepheid variables are caused by pulsations in their outer layers, causing both the temperature and radius to change. The radius of T Antliae has been calculated to vary by 5.4 R_{☉} as it pulsates, around 10% of its radius. The temperature, and hence the spectral type, also vary. Spectral types between F6 and G5 have been published for T Antliae.

== Stellar system ==
The timing of the light variations of T Antliae show a small scatter which can be fitted to a sine curve. This has been proposed to be due to light travel time caused by orbital movement of the variable star. This is based on somewhat uncertain data from old photograph records, and there is no confirmation of a companion. A compatible orbit would take 42.4 years to complete, with a semimajor axis around 10.8 Astronomical Units.

A sparse open cluster lies around the position of T Antliae. Fitting of isochrones to the brighter stars shows a main sequence turnoff consistent with the position of T Antliae in the H-R diagram. The bluest stars in the cluster, and T Antliae itself, best match an isochrone of 100 million years. Fitting to redder stars in the cluster gives an age of around 79 million years.
