= SV Vulpeculae =

Star in the constellation Vulpecula

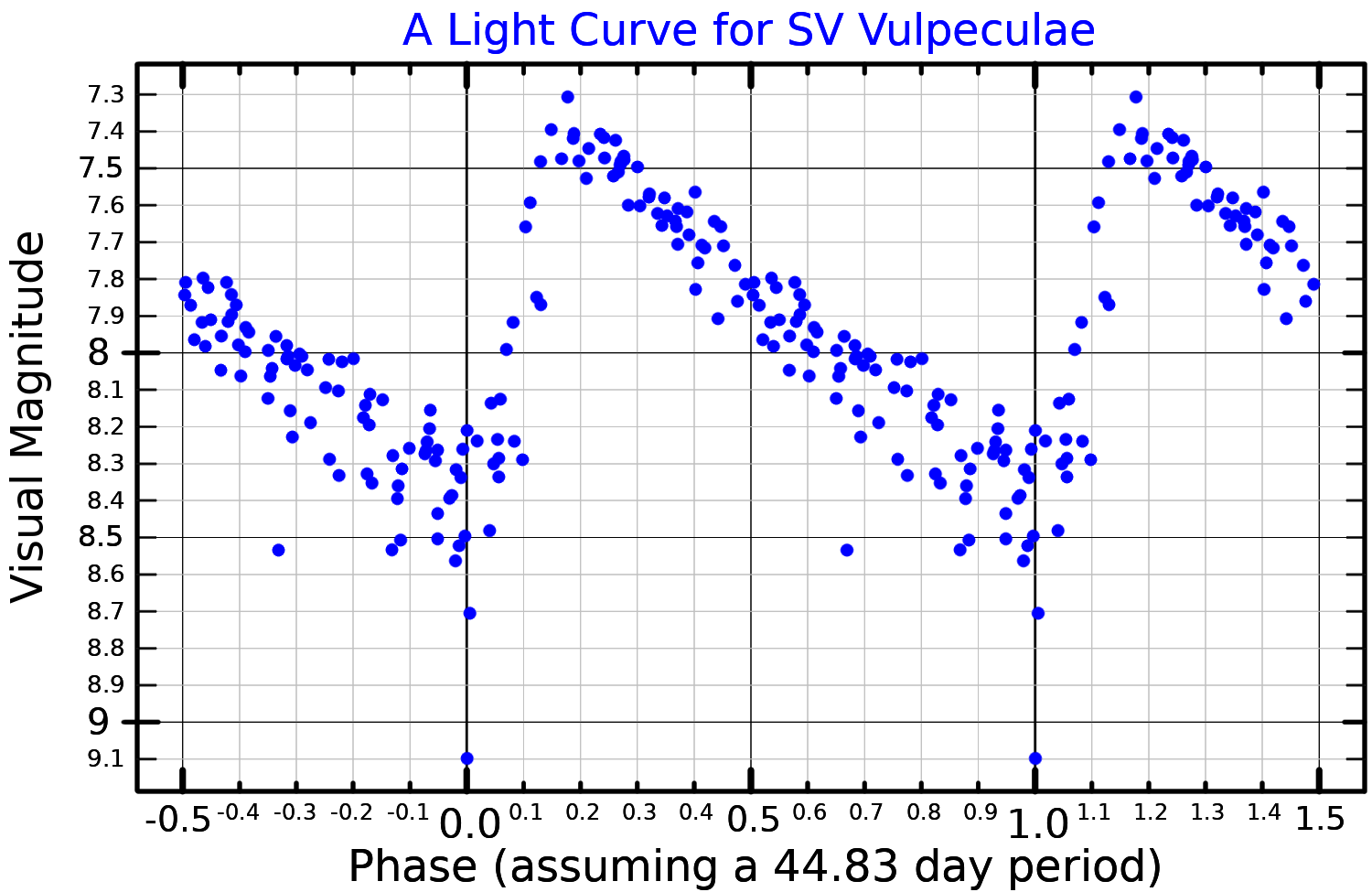
- A visual band light curve for SV Vulpeculae, plotted from ASAS-SN data

Observation data Epoch J2000 Equinox ICRS
- Constellation: Vulpecula
- Right ascension: 19^{h} 51^{m} 30.9060^{s}
- Declination: +27° 27′ 36.836″
- Apparent magnitude (V): 6.72 - 7.79

Characteristics
- Spectral type: F7Iab-K0Iab
- U−B color index: +0.868 - +1.659
- B−V color index: +1.149 - +1.786
- Variable type: δ Cep

Astrometry
Radial velocity (R_{v})	−2.00 km/s
Proper motion (μ)	RA: −2.139±0.045 mas/yr Dec.: −5.820±0.050 mas/yr
Parallax (π)	0.3729±0.0303 mas
Distance	8,700 ± 700 ly (2,700 ± 200 pc)
Absolute magnitude (M_{V})	−5.8

Details
Mass	10 M_{☉}
Radius	187.9 - 238.4 R_{☉}
Luminosity	15,800 L_{☉}
Surface gravity (log g)	0.50 - 1.60 cgs
Temperature	4,861 - 6,110 K
Metallicity	+0.05
Age	30 Myr

Other designations
- SV Vul, HD 187921, HIP 97717, BD+27°3536

Database references
SIMBAD	data

SV Vulpeculae is a classical Cepheid (δ Cepheid) variable star in the constellation Vulpecula. It is a supergiant at a distance of 8,700 light years. It is not visible to the naked eye, but can be seen with binoculars.

In 1921, it was announced that Johanna C. Mackie had discovered the star's brightness varies. It was given its variable star designation in 1922. SV Vulpeculae is a δ Cepheid variable whose visual apparent magnitude ranges from 6.72 to 7.79 over 45.0121 days. The light curve is highly asymmetric, with the rise from minimum to maximum taking more less than a third of the time for the fall from maximum to minimum. The period has been decreasing on average by 214 seconds/year.

SV Vulpeculae is a yellow bright supergiant around twenty thousand times as luminous as the sun, with a spectral type that varies from late F to early K. It pulsates and varies in temperature from below 5,000 K to above 6,000 K. The radius is 216.5 R_{☉} at maximum, and varies from 188 R_{☉} to 238 R_{☉} as the star pulsates.

The mass of SV Vulpeculae is now near 10 M_{☉}. The rate of change of the period and the atmospheric abundances show that the star is crossing the instability strip for the second time. The first instability strip crossing occurs rapidly during the transition from the main sequence to becoming a red supergiant. The second crossing occurs during core helium burning when the star executes a blue loop, becoming hotter for a time before returning to the red supergiant stage.

SV Vul is a member of the open cluster Alicante 13, and may be part of a broader stellar complex including the open cluster Liu-Pang 1738.
