= V473 Lyrae =

Star in the constellation Lyra

- Location of V473 Lyrae (circled)

Observation data Epoch J2000 Equinox ICRS
- Constellation: Lyra
- Right ascension: 19^{h} 15^{m} 59.48949^{s}
- Declination: +27° 55′ 34.6870″
- Apparent magnitude (V): 5.99 – 6.35

Characteristics
- Spectral type: F7 II
- U−B color index: +0.272 – +0.392
- B−V color index: +0.554 – +0.750
- Variable type: δ Cep

Astrometry
Proper motion (μ)	RA: 4.31±0.22 mas/yr Dec.: 0.63±0.34 mas/yr
Parallax (π)	2.33±0.32 mas
Distance	553 pc
Absolute magnitude (M_{V})	−2.5

Details
Mass	3.0 – 4.6 M_{☉}
Radius	24 R_{☉}
Luminosity	740 L_{☉}
Surface gravity (log g)	2.14 cgs
Temperature	6,190 K
Metallicity [Fe/H]	−0.13 dex

Other designations
- BD+27°3314, V473 Lyrae, SAO 87008, HD 180583, HIP 94685, HR 7308

Database references
SIMBAD	data

V473 Lyrae is a variable star in the constellation Lyra. It is an unusual Classical Cepheid variable with a visual range of 5.99 to 6.35.

== Discovery ==
V473 Lyrae is a faint naked eye star, but its brightness variations were not reported until 1968. It was noted to be possibly variable, then examined as a possible δ Sct variable. It was confirmed as variable but the variations were considered semi-regular and so it was not catalogued as a δ Sct variable.

In 1979, brightness variations were again noticed and V473 was listed as a short-period Cepheid, although the period was thought to be 3.04 days. The correct period was found a few years later at 1.49078 days, at the time the shortest known period for a galactic Cepheid. Unusual periodic variations in the pulsation amplitude were also noticed, similar to the Blazhko effect in RR Lyrae variables.

== Pulsations ==
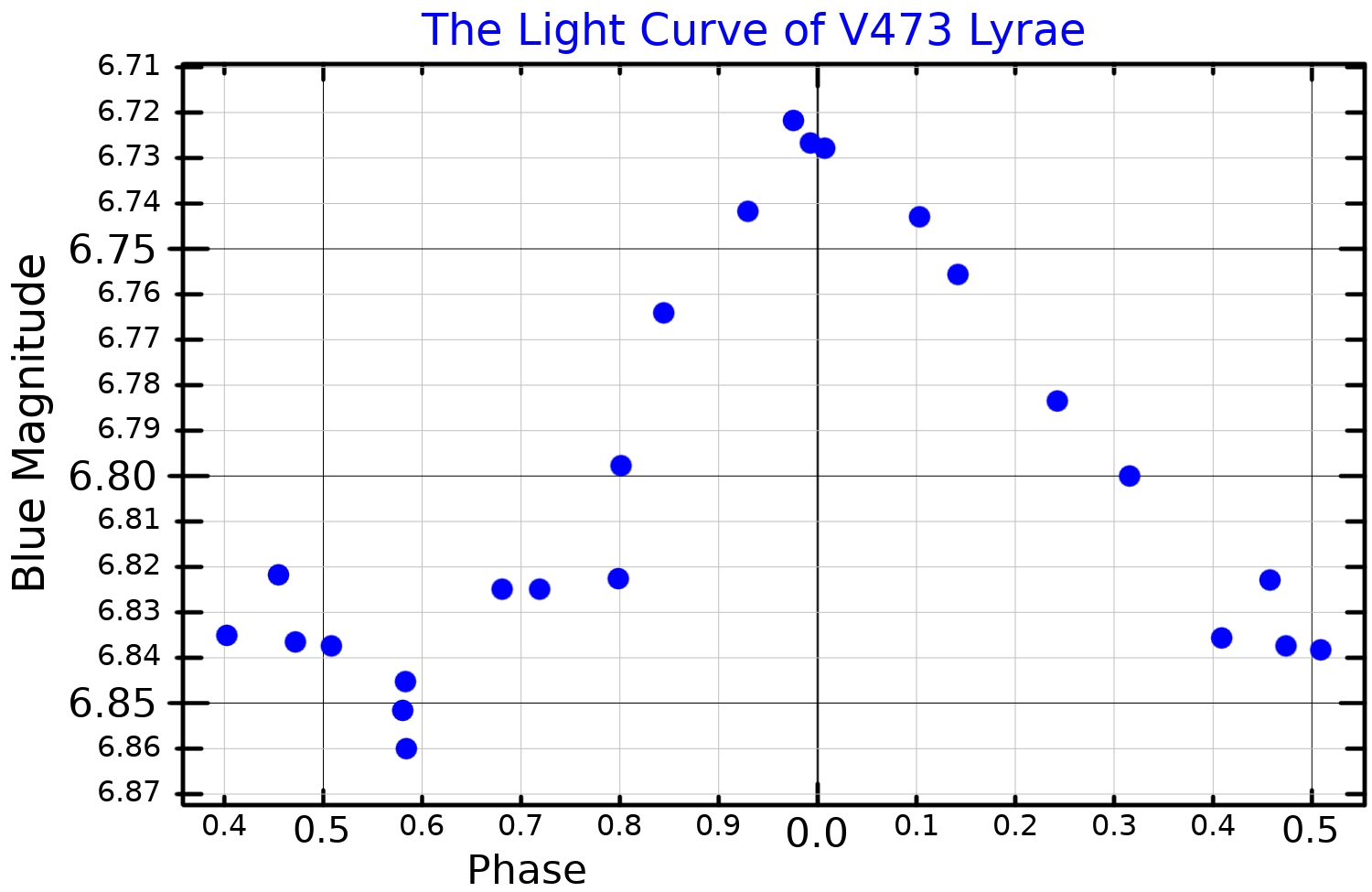
A blue band light curve for V473 Lyrae, adapted from Kiss (1998)

The unusually short period of V473 Lyr is caused by pulsations in the second overtone and the fundamental pulsation period would be three times as long. The amplitude variations have an approximate period of 1,205 days, and there is a secondary modulation with a period of 5,300 days.

== Companion ==
V473 Lyrae has a faint companion. Although the two stars are separated by 15", the companion is 15th magnitude and so faint that it is difficult to detect next to the naked eye primary. At the distance of V473 Lyrae, the separation corresponds to 8,300 astronomical units.

== X-rays ==
X-rays have been detected from V473 Lyrae during a survey looking for x-rays from young main sequence companions to Cepheid variables. However, the x-rays in this case appear to originate from the Cepheid itself, not from the companion. There may be a closer unseen companion or the x-rays may have another cause.
