= TT Aquilae =

Star in the constellation Aquila

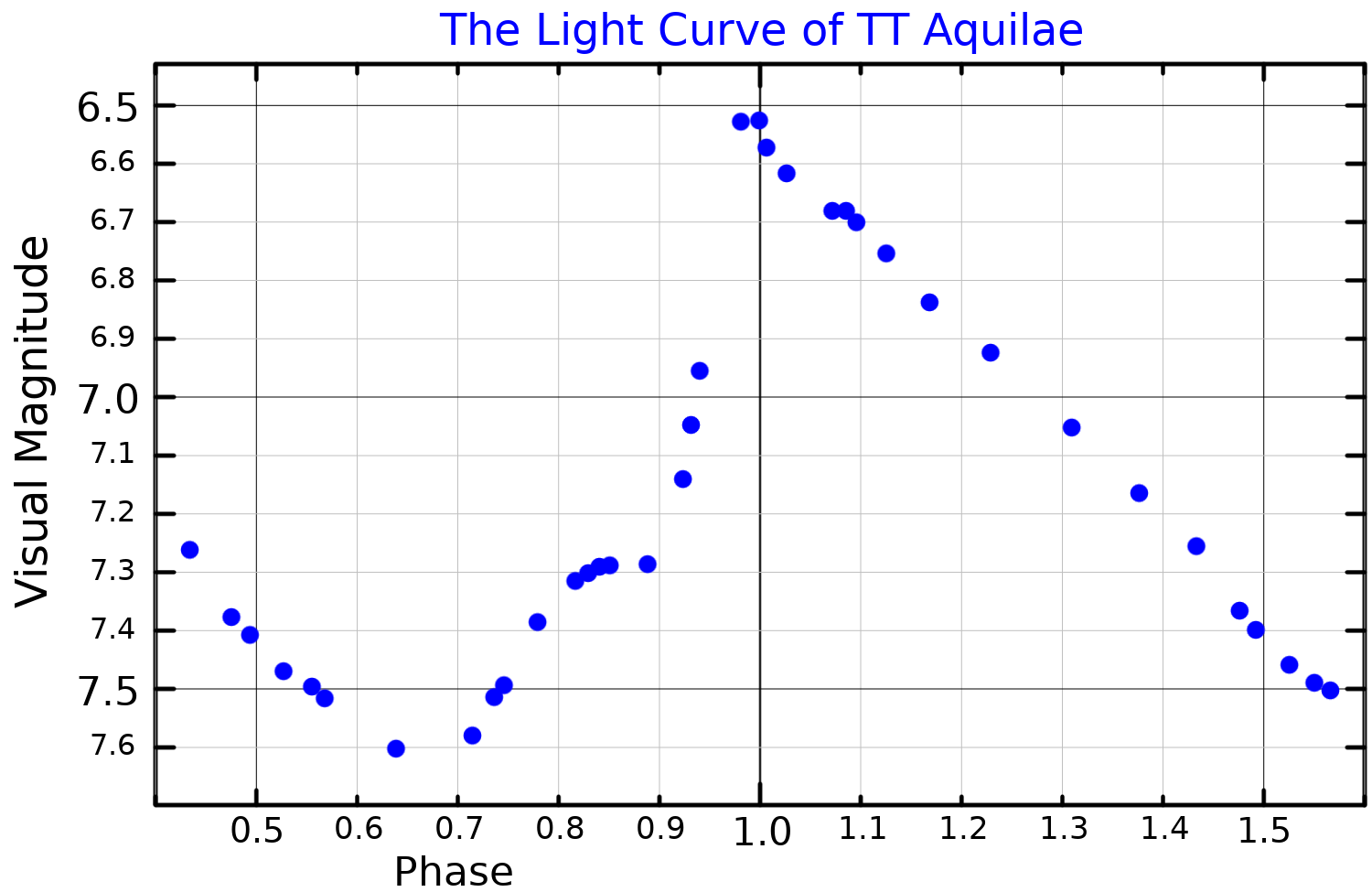
- A visual band light curve for TT Aquilae, adapted from Kiss (1998)

Observation data Epoch J2000 Equinox ICRS
- Constellation: Aquila
- Right ascension: 19^{h} 08^{m} 13.75081^{s}
- Declination: +01° 17′ 55.1600″
- Apparent magnitude (V): 6.52 - 7.65

Characteristics
- Spectral type: G0/2Ib (F6-G5)
- U−B color index: +0.638 - +1.601
- B−V color index: +0.932 - +1.637
- Variable type: δ Cep

Astrometry
Radial velocity (R_{v})	3.00 km/s
Proper motion (μ)	RA: +1.17 mas/yr Dec.: −3.33 mas/yr
Parallax (π)	0.18±1.26 mas
Distance	3,387 ± 78.83004 ly (1038.75 ± 24.1694 pc)
Absolute magnitude (M_{V})	−4.26

Details
Mass	6.2 - 8.6 M_{☉}
Radius	83.8 - 100.5 R_{☉}
Luminosity	5,284 L_{☉}
Surface gravity (log g)	1.10 - 1.70 cgs
Temperature	5,007 - 5,630 (- 6,200) K
Metallicity	+0.10

Other designations
- TT Aql, HD 178359, HIP 93390, BD+01°3899, SAO 124305

Database references
SIMBAD	data

Data sources:

Hipparcos Catalogue, CCDM (2002), Bright Star Catalogue (5th rev. ed.)

TT Aquilae (TT Aql) is a Classical Cepheid (δ Cep) variable star in the constellation Aquila.

The visual apparent magnitude of TT Aql ranges from 6.52 to 7.65 over 13.7546 days. The light curve is asymmetric, with the rise from minimum to maximum brightness only taking half the time of the fall from maximum to minimum.

The announcement that the star's brightness varies was made in 1907 by Annie Jump Cannon. It had been observed on 506 photographs taken from May 22, 1888 through November 9, 1906, from which a period of 13.75 days had been derived.

TT Aql is a yellow-white supergiant around five thousand times brighter than the sun. The star is located around 3,378 LY from our Sun, which was determined by the European Space Agency's Gaia mission using stellar parallax. It pulsates and varies in temperature between about 5,000 K and 6,000 K, and the spectral type varies between F6 and G5. The radius is 91.4 R_{☉} at maximum brightness, varying between 84 R_{☉} and 100 R_{☉} as the star pulsates.

Cepheid masses can be estimated using Baade-Wesselink relations and this gives 8.6 M_{☉}. The mass estimated by matching to evolutionary tracks is 7.7 M_{☉}. The mass calculated by modelling the pulsations is 6.2 M_{☉}. The discrepancies between the masses obtained by the different methods occurs for most Cepheid variables.
