= V636 Scorpii =

Spectroscopic binary star system in the constellation Scorpius

V636 Sco
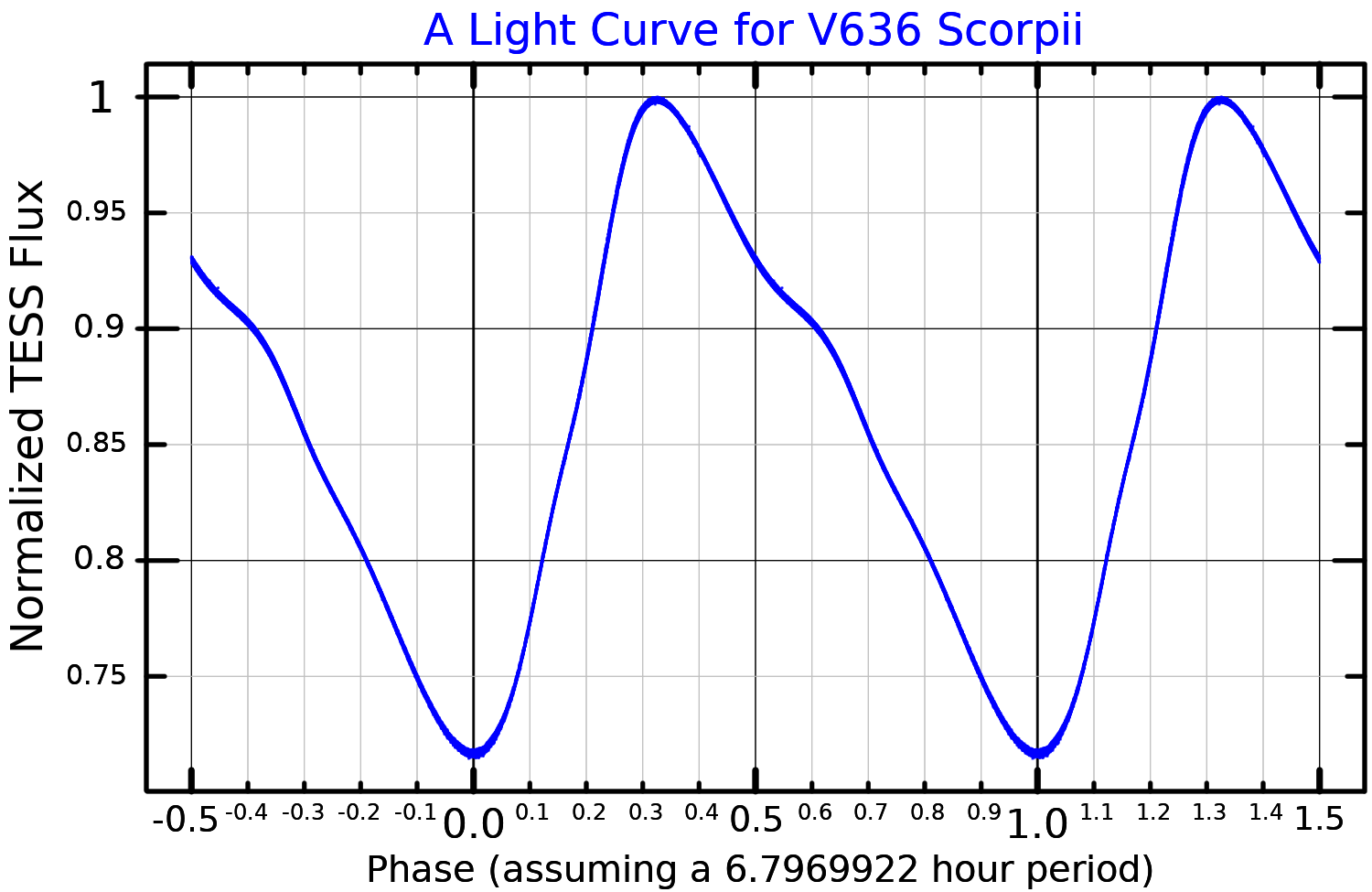
- A light curve for V636 Scorpii, plotted from TESS data

Observation data Epoch J2000 Equinox ICRS
- Constellation: Scorpius
- Right ascension: 17^{h} 22^{m} 46.47796^{s}
- Declination: −45° 36′ 51.3868″
- Apparent magnitude (V): 6.40 - 6.92

Characteristics

Cepheid
- Spectral type: F7/8Ib/II-G5
- Variable type: δ Cep

companion
- Spectral type: B9.5V

Astrometry
Radial velocity (R_{v})	9.09 ± 0.17 km/s
Proper motion (μ)	RA: -3.05 ± 1.03 mas/yr Dec.: -2.40 ± 0.38 mas/yr
Parallax (π)	1.15±0.76 mas
Distance	approx. 3,000 ly (approx. 900 pc)
Absolute magnitude (M_{V})	-3.64

Orbit
Period (P)	1,320.6±1.3 days
Semi-major axis (a)	≥1.401±0.009 au
Eccentricity (e)	0.250±0.004
Periastron epoch (T)	2,456,865.5±5.7 JD
Argument of periastron (ω) (secondary)	288.0±2.5°
Semi-amplitude (K_{1}) (primary)	11.98±0.06 km/s

Details

Cepheid
Mass	5.6 M_{☉}
Radius	~50 R_{☉}
Luminosity	2,500 L_{☉}
Metallicity	+0.07

companion
Mass	2.3±0.3 M_{☉}

Other designations
- V636 Sco, HIP 85035, CD−45°11441, HD 156979, SAO 227880

Database references
SIMBAD	data

V636 Scorpii is a multiple star system in the constellation Scorpius, 3,000 light years away. The primary is a Classical Cepheid (δ Cephei) variable and its visual magnitude varies from 6.4 to 6.9.

V636 Scorpii is a spectroscopic binary, and the fainter companion is thought to itself consist of two stars. The primary is a luminous yellow star and a δ Cephei variable. The less massive companion orbits every 3.6 years and is apparently a B9.5 main sequence star, but the dynamics of the system suggest that it may actually be a pair of stars is a close orbit.

The Cepheid primary pulsates regularly with a period of 6.79671 days. It is a yellow-white supergiant or bright giant that is 5.6 times as massive as the Sun and 2,500 times as luminous.
