= R Muscae =

Variable star in the constellation Musca

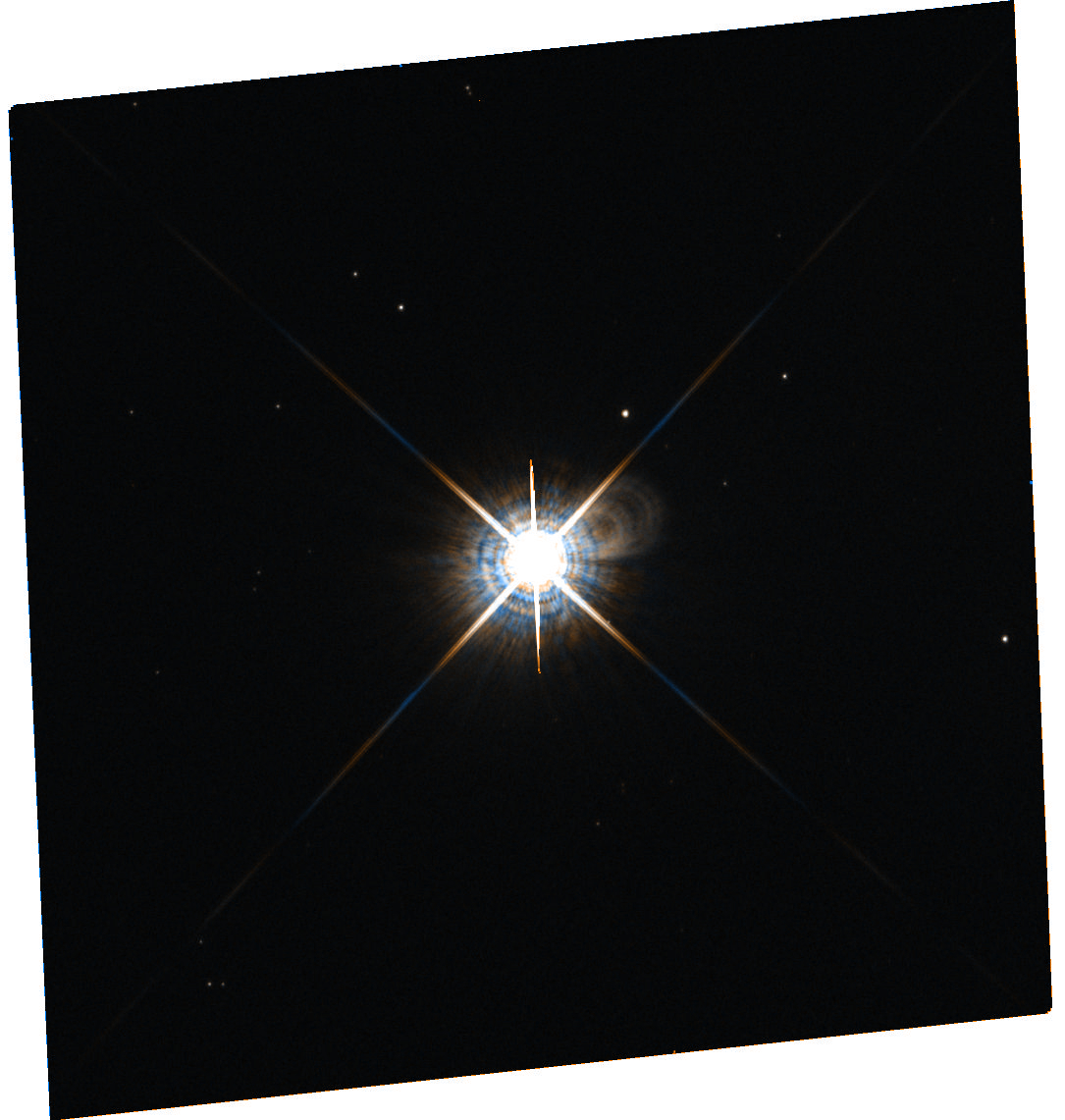
- Hubble Space Telescope image of R Muscae

Observation data Epoch J2000 Equinox J2000
- Constellation: Musca
- Right ascension: 12^{h} 42^{m} 05.02561^{s}
- Declination: −69° 24′ 27.1966″
- Apparent magnitude (V): 5.93 - 6.73

Characteristics
- Spectral type: F7 Ib - G2
- B−V color index: 0.750±0.020
- Variable type: δ Cep

Astrometry
Radial velocity (R_{v})	+3.8±2.9 km/s
Proper motion (μ)	RA: −4.180 mas/yr Dec.: −2.127 mas/yr
Parallax (π)	1.0002±0.0291 mas
Distance	3,260 ± 90 ly (1,000 ± 30 pc)
Absolute magnitude (M_{V})	-3.62

Details
Radius	65 R_{☉}
Luminosity	2,541 L_{☉}
Surface gravity (log g)	2.0±0.1 cgs
Temperature	5,985±54 K
Metallicity [Fe/H]	+0.10±0.05 dex

Other designations
- R Mus, AAVSO 1236-68, CD−68°1119, HD 110311, HIP 61981, HR 4820, SAO 251996

Database references
SIMBAD	data

R Muscae is a yellow-white hued variable star in the southern constellation of Musca. It has a nominal apparent visual magnitude of 6.31, which is near the lower limit of visibility to the naked eye. The distance to this star, as determined from its annual parallax shift of 1.00 mas, is around 3,260 light years.

This is an F-type supergiant star with a baseline stellar classification of F7 Ib. It is a Classical Cepheid variable ranging from apparent magnitude 5.93 to 6.73 over 7.51 days, while varying between spectral types F7 Ib and G2. The star was suspected of having a detectable companion, but this finding was later disputed. Gaia and HST observations have shown that there is a companion, a 15th-magnitude star 7″ away. There is an X-ray source with a luminosity of 6.3×10^{29} erg s^{−1} located at an angular separation of 1.9″ from R Muscae.

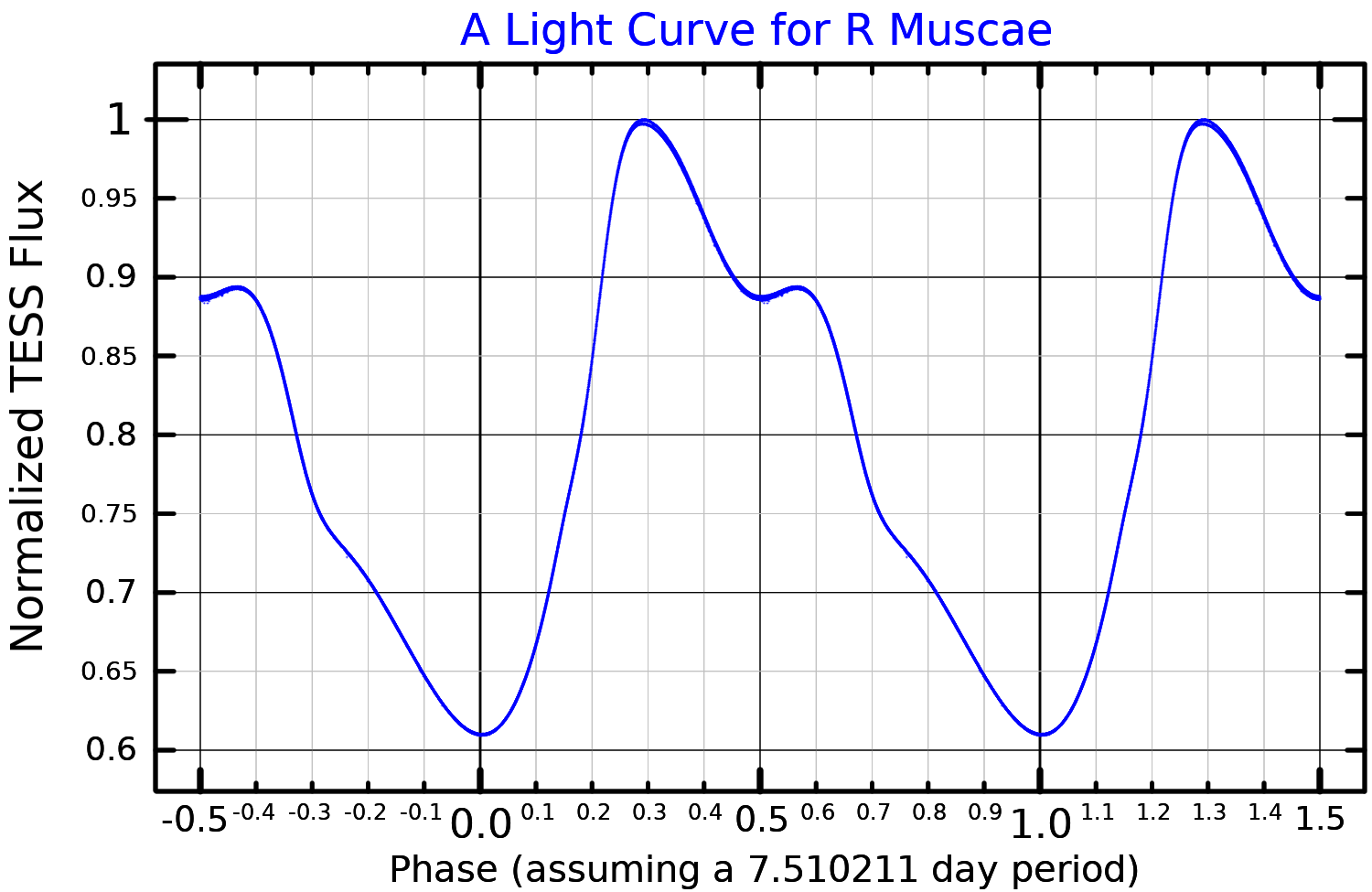
A light curve for R Muscae, plotted from TESS data
