= NGC 4603 =

Galaxy in the constellation Centaurus

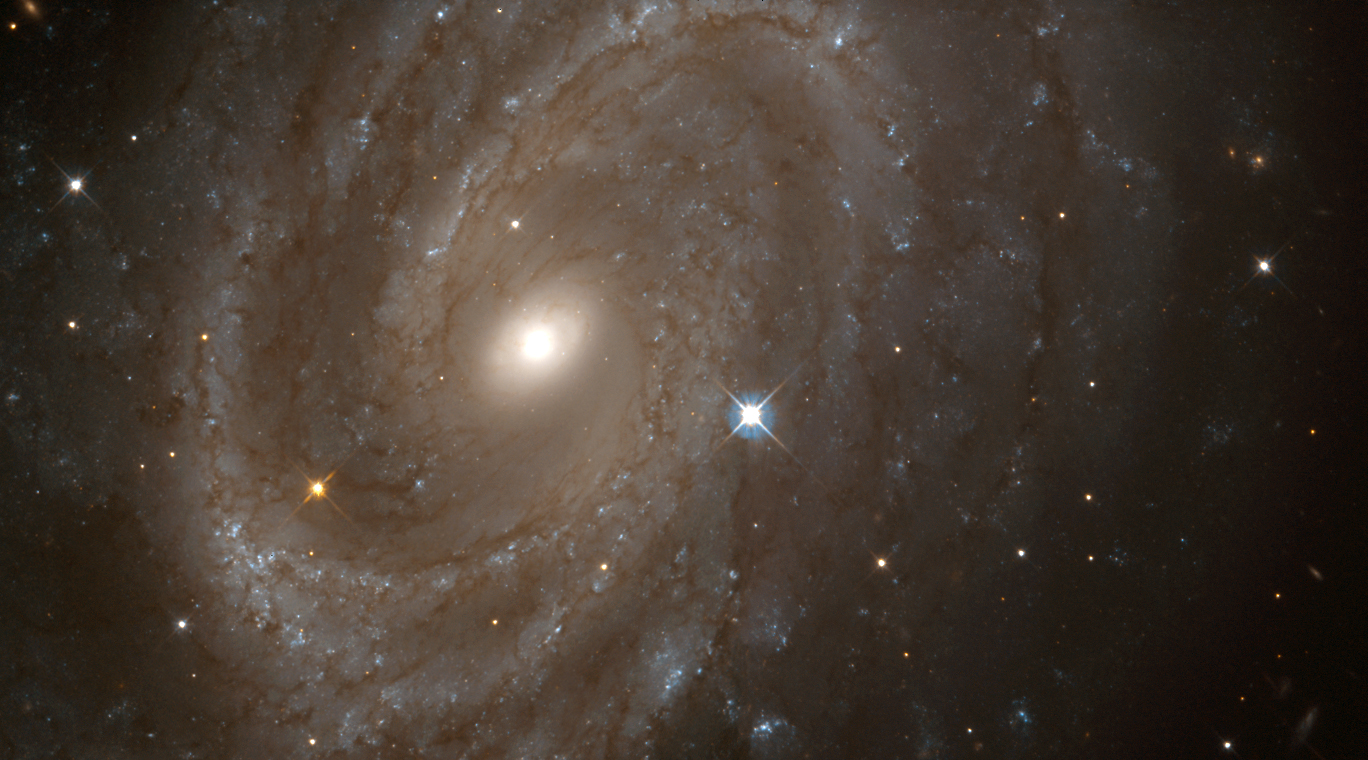
- A Hubble Space Telescope (HST) image of NGC 4603.

Observation data (J2000 epoch)
- Constellation: Centaurus
- Right ascension: 12^{h} 40^{m} 55.195^{s}
- Declination: –40° 58′ 35.05″
- Heliocentric radial velocity: +2561 km/s
- Distance: 106.8 Mly (32.71 Mpc)
- Apparent magnitude (V): 12.3

Characteristics
- Type: SA(s)c
- Size: 100,000 ly (diameter)
- Apparent size (V): 3′.4 × 2′.5

Other designations
- PGC 42510

NGC 4603 is a spiral galaxy located about 107 million light years away in the constellation Centaurus. It is a member of the Centaurus Cluster of galaxies, belonging to the section designated "Cen30". The morphological classification is SA(s)c, which indicates it is a pure spiral galaxy with relatively loosely wound arms.

During 1999, this galaxy was the subject of an extended study using the Hubble Space Telescope to locate Cepheid variable stars. A total of 43±7 were found, and the measurement of their periodicity gave a net distance estimate of 108.7+5.5
−4.9 Mly (33.3+1.7
−1.5 Mpc). This is consistent with the distance estimate determined through redshift measurements. As of the time of this study, NGC 4603 was the most distant galaxy for which a distance estimate had been made using Cepheid variable.

On May 21, 2008, supernova SN 2008cn was discovered at a position 23.″2 north and 4.″7 east of the galaxy center. It was determined to be a high-luminosity Type II-P supernova, with a progenitor tentatively identified as a red supergiant with 15 ± 2 solar masses. Based upon the yellowish color, it may have been a member of a binary star system.
