= HD 90264 =

Binary star in the constellation Carina

Observation data Epoch J2000.0 Equinox ICRS
- Constellation: Carina
- Right ascension: 10^{h} 22^{m} 58.14606^{s}
- Declination: −66° 54′ 05.3903″
- Apparent magnitude (V): 4.97

Characteristics
- Evolutionary stage: main sequence
- Spectral type: B8V
- B−V color index: −0.128±0.003

Astrometry
Radial velocity (R_{v})	+12.0±4.2 km/s
Proper motion (μ)	RA: −22.39 mas/yr Dec.: +11.48 mas/yr
Parallax (π)	8.12±0.18 mas
Distance	402 ± 9 ly (123 ± 3 pc)
Absolute magnitude (M_{V})	−0.403

Orbit
Period (P)	15.727±0.001 d
Semi-major axis (a)	52.66 R_{☉}
Eccentricity (e)	0.044±0.014
Inclination (i)	54°
Periastron epoch (T)	2,452,814.78±1.05 JD
Argument of periastron (ω) (secondary)	138±25°
Semi-amplitude (K_{1}) (primary)	62.2±1.9 km/s
Semi-amplitude (K_{2}) (secondary)	76.0±1.5 km/s

Details

A
Mass	4.3 M_{☉}
Luminosity	288.39 L_{☉}
Rotational velocity (v sin i)	7 km/s
Age	18 Myr

B
Mass	3.5 M_{☉}

Other designations
- L Car, CPD−66°1243, FK5 2834, GC 14283, HD 90264, HIP 50847, HR 4089, SAO 250940

Database references
SIMBAD	data

HD 90264 is a binary star system in the southern constellation of Carina. It has the Bayer designation of L Carinae, while HD 90264 is the star's identifier in the Henry Draper catalogue. This system has a blue-white hue and is faintly visible to the naked eye with an apparent visual magnitude of 4.97. It is located at a distance of approximately 402 light years from the Sun based on parallax, and is drifting further away with a radial velocity of around +12 km/s. The system is a member of the Lower Centaurus Crux association of the Sco-Cen Complex.

This system was found to be a close double-lined spectroscopic binary in 1977, consisting of two B-type main-sequence stars. It has a near circular orbit with a period of 15.727 days and a semimajor axis of 0.2449 AU. They appear to be spin-orbit synchronized. Both stars appear to be deficient in helium. The primary is a helium variable star while the companion is a mercury-manganese star. The variability of both stars aligns favorably with the orbital period.
