= List of variable stars =

As of 2017, there are over 52,011 known variable stars, with more being discovered regularly, so a complete list of every single variable is impossible at this place (cf. GCVS). The following is a list of variable stars that are well-known, bright, significant, or otherwise interesting.

Designation (name)	Constellation	Discovery	Apparent magnitude (Maximum)	Apparent magnitude (Minimum)	Range of magnitude	Period	Type	Comment
R And	Andromeda		5^{m}.8	14^{m}.9	9.1	409 d	Mira variable (M)	
S And (Supernova 1885)	Andromeda	Ernst Hartwig, August 20, 1885	5^{m}.8	16^{m}	10.2		Supernova (SNI)	
U Ant	Antlia		8^{m}.1 (p)	9^{m}.7 (p)	1.6		LB	
θ Aps	Apus		6^{m}.4 (p)	8^{m}.6 (p)	2.2	119 d	Semiregular (SRB)	
η Aql (Pagru)	Aquila	Pigott, 1784	3^{m}.48	4^{m}.39	0.91	7.17664 d	Classical Cepheid (DCEP)	
R Aql	Aquila		5^{m}.5	12^{m}.0	6.5	284 d	Mira variable (M)	
V Aql	Aquila		6^{m}.6	8^{m}.4	1.8	353 d	Semiregular (SRB)	
R Aqr	Aquarius	Karl Ludwig Harding, 1810	5^{m}.8	12^{m}.4	6.9	387 d	Mira variable (M)	
T Aqr	Aquarius		7^{m}.2	14^{m}.2	7.0	202 d	Mira variable (M)	
U Ara	Ara		7^{m}.7	14^{m}.1	6.4	225 d	Mira variable (M)	
R Ari	Aries		7^{m}.4	13^{m}.7	6.3	187 d	Mira variable (M)	
U Ari	Aries		7^{m}.2	15^{m}.2	8.0	371 d	Mira variable (M)	
ε Aur (Almaaz)	Auriga	Johann Heinrich Fritsch, 1821	2^{m}.92	3^{m}.83	0.91	27.08 years	Eclipsing binary Algol type (EA/GS)	
R Aur	Auriga		6^{m}.7	13^{m}.9	7.2	458 d	Mira variable (M)	
AE Aur	Auriga		5^{m}.78	6^{m}.08	0.30		Orion variable (INA)	
R Boo	Boötes		6^{m}.2	13^{m}.1	6.9	223 d	Mira variable (M)	
W Boo (Alrumh)	Boötes		4^{m}.73	5^{m}.4	0.67	450 d	Semiregular (SRB:)	
X Cam	Camelopardalis		7^{m}.4	14^{m}.2	6.8	144 d	Mira variable (M)	
VZ Cam	Camelopardalis		4^{m}.80	4^{m}.96	0.16	23.7 d	Semiregular (SR)	
R Cap	Capricornus	Hind, 1848	9^{m}.4	14^{m}.9	5.5	345 d	Mira variable (M)	
η Car	Carina	Burchell, 1827	-0^{m}.8	7^{m}.9	8.6		S Doradus (SDOR)	"The unpredictable supergiant"
l Car	Carina		3^{m}.28	4^{m}.18	0.90	35.53584 d	Classical Cepheid (DCEP)	
R Car	Carina		3^{m}.9	10^{m}.5	6.6	309 d	Mira variable (M)	
S Car	Carina		4^{m}.5	9^{m}.9	5.4	149 d	Mira variable (M)	
γ Cas (Tiansi)	Cassiopeia		1^{m}.6	3^{m}.0	1.4		Gamma Cassiopeiae (GCAS)	
R Cas	Cassiopeia		4^{m}.7	13^{m}.5	8.9	430 d	Mira variable (M)	
S Cas	Cassiopeia		7^{m}.9	16^{m}.1	8.2	612 d	Mira variable (M)	
W Cas	Cassiopeia		7^{m}.8	12^{m}.5	4.7	406 d	Mira variable (M)	
WZ Cas	Cassiopeia		6^{m}.3	8^{m}.5	2.2		Semiregular (SRB)	Visual double star, visible through binoculars
R Cen	Centaurus		5^{m}.3	11^{m}.8	6.5	546 d	Mira variable (M)	
S Cen	Centaurus		9^{m}.2 (p)	10^{m}.7 (p)	1.5	65 d	Semiregular (SR)	
T Cen	Centaurus		5^{m}.5	9^{m}.0	3.5	90.44 d	Semiregular (SRA)	
V645 Cen (Proxima Centauri)	Centaurus		12^{m}.1 (B)	13^{m}.12 (B)	1.02		UV Ceti (UV)	
δ Cep	Cepheus	John Goodricke, 1784	3^{m}.48	4^{m}.37	0.89	5.36634 d	Classical Cepheid (DCEP) prototype	double star, visible in binoculars
Vega	Lyra		-0^{m}.02	0^{m}.07	0.09	0.107 d	Delta Scuti variable	Brightest variable star in the sky.
μ Cep (Herschel's Garnet Star)	Cepheus	William Herschel, 1782	3^{m}.43	5^{m}.1	1.67	730 d	Semiregular (SRC)	
S Cep	Cepheus		7^{m}.4	12^{m}.9	5.5	487 d	Mira variable (M)	
T Cep	Cepheus		5^{m}.2	11^{m}.3	6.1	388 d	Mira variable (M)	
U Cep	Cepheus		6^{m}.75	9^{m}.24	2.49	2.49305 d	Eclipsing binary Algol type (EA/SD)	
SS Cep	Cepheus		8^{m}.0 (p)	9^{m}.1 (p)	1.1	90 d	Semiregular (SRB)	
ST Cep	Cepheus		7^{m}.8			None	Mira variable (M)	
AR Cep	Cepheus		7^{m}.0	7^{m}.9	0.9		Semiregular (SRB)	
ο Cet (Mira)	Cetus	David Fabricius, 1596; variability may have been first noted by Johannes Fokkes Holwarda, 1638	2^{m}.0	10^{m}.1	8.1	332 d	Mira variable (M)	"The miraculous" The first discovered non-ephemeral/cataclysmic variable star.
T Cet	Cetus		5^{m}.0	6^{m}.9	1.9	159 d	Semiregular (SRC)	
U Cet	Cetus		6^{m}.8	13^{m}.4	6.6	235 d	Mira variable (M)	
W Cet	Cetus		7^{m}.1	14^{m}.8	7.7	351 d	Mira variable (M)	
R Cha	Chamaeleon		7^{m}.5	14^{m}.2	6.7	335 d	Mira variable (M)	
R CMa	Canis Major		5^{m}.70	6^{m}.34	0.64	1.13594 d	Eclipsing binary Algol type (EA/SD)	
VY CMa	Canis Major		6^{m}.5	9^{m}.6	3.1		unique (*)	
FW CMa	Canis Major		5^{m}.00	5^{m}.50	0.50		Gamma Cassiopeiae (GCAS)	
S CMi	Canis Major		6^{m}.6	13^{m}.2	6.6	333 d	Mira variable (M)	
R Cnc	Cancer		6^{m}.07	11^{m}.8	5.73	362 d	Mira variable (M)	
S Cnc	Cancer	Hind, 1848	8^{m}.29	10^{m}.25	1.96	9.48455 d	Eclipsing binary Algol type (EA/DS)	
T Cnc	Cancer	Hind, 1850	7^{m}.6	10^{m}.5	2.9	482 d	Semiregular (SRB)	
X Cnc	Cancer		5^{m}.6	7^{m}.5	1.9	195 d	Semiregular (SRB)	
T Col	Columba		6^{m}.6	12^{m}.7	6.1	226 d	Mira variable (M)	
R Com	Coma Berenices		7^{m}.1	14^{m}.6	7.5	363 d	Mira variable (M)	
α CrB (Alphecca or Gemma)	Corona Borealis		2^{m}.21 (B)	2^{m}.32 (B)	0.11	17.35991 d	Eclipsing binary Algol type (EA/DM)	
R CrB	Corona Borealis	Piggott, 1795	5^{m}.71	14^{m}.8	9.09		R Coronae Borealis (RCB)	
S CrB	Corona Borealis		5^{m}.8	14^{m}.1	8.7	360 d	Mira variable (M)	
T CrB (Blaze Star)	Corona Borealis		2^{m}.0	10^{m}.8	8.8	(80 years)	recurrent nova (NR)	
U CrB	Corona Borealis		7^{m}.66	8^{m}.79	1.13	3.45220 d	Eclipsing binary Algol type (EA/SD)	
V CrB	Corona Borealis		6^{m}.9	12^{m}.6	5.3	358 d	Mira variable (M)	
W CrB	Corona Borealis		7^{m}.8	14^{m}.3	6.5	238 d	Mira variable (M)	
R Cru	Crux		6^{m}.40	7^{m}.23	0.83	5.82575 d	Classical Cepheid (DCEP)	
R Crv	Corvus		6^{m}.7	14^{m}.4	7.7	317 d	Mira variable (M)	
χ Cyg	Cygnus	Kirch, 1686	3^{m}.3	14^{m}.2	10.9	408 d	Mira variable (M)	
R Cyg	Cygnus		6^{m}.1	14^{m}.4	8.3	426 d	Mira variable (M)	
U Cyg	Cygnus		5^{m}.9	12^{m}.1	6.2	463 d	Mira variable (M)	
W Cyg	Cygnus		6^{m}.80 (B)	8^{m}.9 (B)	2.1	131 d	Semiregular (SRB)	
X Cyg	Cygnus		5^{m}.85	6^{m}.91	1.06	16.38633 d	Classical Cepheid (DCEP)	
RT Cyg	Cygnus		6^{m}.0	13^{m}.1	7.1	190 d	Mira variable (M)	
SS Cyg	Cygnus		7^{m}.7	12^{m}.4	4.7	(49.5 d)	dwarf nova UGSS prototype	
SU Cyg	Cygnus		6^{m}.44	7^{m}.22	0.78	3.84555 d	Classical Cepheid (DCEP)	
CH Cyg	Cygnus		5^{m}.60	8^{m}.49	2.89		Z Andromedae (ZAND+SR)	
R Del	Delphinus		7^{m}.6	13^{m}.8	6.2	285 d	Mira variable (M)	
U Del	Delphinus		7^{m}.6 (p)	8^{m}.9 (p)	1.3	110 d	Semiregular (SRB)	
EU Del	Delphinus		5^{m}.79	6^{m}.9	1.11	59.7 d	Semiregular (SRB)	
β Dor	Dorado		3^{m}.46	4^{m}.08	0.62	9.8426 d	Classical Cepheid (DCEP)	
S Dor	Dorado		8^{m}.6 (B)	11^{m}.5 (B)	2.9		S Doradus (SDOR) (prototype)	in the Large Magellanic Cloud
R Dra	Draco		6^{m}.7	13^{m}.2	6.5	246 d	Mira variable (M)	
T Eri	Eridanus		7^{m}.2	13^{m}.2	6.0	252 d	Mira variable (M)	
R For	Fornax		7^{m}.5	13^{m}.0	5.5	389 d	Mira variable (M)	
η Gem (Propus)	Gemini		3^{m}.15	3^{m}.9	0.75	233 d	Semiregular (SRA+EA)	
ζ Gem (Mekbuda)	Gemini		3^{m}.62	4^{m}.18	0.56	10.15073 d	Classical Cepheid (DCEP)	
R Gem	Gemini	Hind, 1848	6^{m}.0	14^{m}.0	8.0	370 d	Mira variable (M)	
S Gem	Gemini	Hind, 1848	8^{m}.0	14^{m}.7	6.7	293 d	Mira variable (M)	
T Gem	Gemini	Hind, 1848	8^{m}.0	15^{m}.0	7.0	288 d	Mira variable (M)	
U Gem	Gemini		8^{m}.2	14^{m}.9	6.7	(105.2 d)	dwarf nova (UGSS+E)	
S Gru	Grus		6^{m}.0	15^{m}.0	9.0	402 d	Mira variable (M)	
α Her (Rasalgethi)	Hercules	William Herschel, 1759	2^{m}.74	4^{m}.0	1.26		Semiregular (SRC)	
g Her (30 Her)	Hercules		4^{m}.3	6^{m}.3	2.0	89.2 d	Semiregular (SRB)	
u Her (68 Her)	Hercules		4^{m}.69	5^{m}.37	0.68	2.05103 d	Eclipsing binary Algol type (EA/SD)	
S Her	Hercules		6^{m}.4	13^{m}.8	7.4	307 d	Mira variable (M)	
U Her	Hercules		6^{m}.4	13^{m}.4	7.0	406 d	Mira variable (M)	
X Her	Hercules		7^{m}.5 (p)	8^{m}.6 (p)	1.1	95.0 d	Semiregular (SRB)	
R Hor	Horologium		4^{m}.7	14^{m}.3	9.6	408 d	Mira variable (M)	
U Hor	Horologium		7^{m}.8 (p)	15^{m}.1 (p)	6.3	348 d	Mira variable (M)	
R Hya	Hydra	Maraldi, 1704	3^{m}.5	10^{m}.9	7.4	389 d	Mira variable (M)	
S Hya	Hydra	Hind, 1848	7^{m}.2	13^{m}.3	6.1	257 d	Mira variable (M)	
U Hya	Hydra		7^{m}.0 (B)	9^{m}.4 (B)	2.4	~450 d	Semiregular (SRB)	
VW Hya	Hydra		10^{m}.5	14^{m}.1	3.6	2.69642 d	Eclipsing binary Algol type (EA/SD)	
BL Lac	Lacerta		12^{m}.4 (B)	17^{m}.2 (B)	4.8		BLLAC prototype	originally thought to be a variable star, but later discovered to be a blazar
R Leo	Leo	J.A. Koch, 1782	4^{m}.4	11^{m}.3	6.9	310 d	Mira variable (M)	
R Lep	Lepus		5^{m}.5	11^{m}.7	6.2	427 d	Mira variable (M)	Hind's Crimson Star
RX Lep	Lepus		5^{m}.0	7^{m}.4	2.4	~60 d	Semiregular (SRB)	
R LMi	Leo Minor		6^{m}.3	13^{m}.2	6.9	372 d	Mira variable (M)	
RU Lup	Lupus		9^{m}.6 (p)	13^{m}.4 (p)	3.8		Orion variable (INT)	
β Lyr (Sheliak)	Lyra	John Goodricke, 1784	3^{m}.25	4^{m}.36	1.11	12.91383 d	Eclipsing binary Beta Lyrae type (prototype)	
R Lyr (Niandao)	Lyra		3^{m}.88	5^{m}.0	1.12	~46 d	Semiregular (SRB)	
RR Lyr	Lyra		7^{m}.06	8^{m}.12	1.06	0.566868 d	RR Lyrae variable (prototype)	
U Mic	Microscopium		7^{m}.0	14^{m}.4	7.7	334 d	Mira variable (M)	
U Mon	Monoceros		6^{m}.1 (p)	8^{m}.8 (p)	2.7	91.3 d	RV Tauri variable (RVB)	
V Mon	Monoceros		6^{m}.0	13^{m}.9	7.9	341 d	Mira variable (M)	
R Nor	Norma		6^{m}.5 (p)	13^{m}.9 (p)	7.4	508 d	Mira variable (M)	
T Nor	Norma		6^{m}.2	13^{m}.6	7.4	241 d	Mira variable (M)	
R Oct	Octans		6^{m}.4	13^{m}.2	6.8	405 d	Mira variable (M)	
S Oct	Octans		7^{m}.2	14^{m}.0	6.8	259 d	Mira variable (M)	
V Oph	Ophiuchus		7^{m}.3	11^{m}.6	4.3	297 d	Mira variable (M)	
X Oph	Ophiuchus		5^{m}.9	9^{m}.2	3.3	329 d	Mira variable (M)	
RS Oph	Ophiuchus		4^{m}.3	12^{m}.5	8.2		recurrent nova (NR)	
BF Oph	Ophiuchus		6^{m}.93	7^{m}.71	0.78	4.06775 d	Classical Cepheid (DCEP)	
α Ori (Betelgeuse)	Orion	John Herschel, 1840	0^{m}.0	1^{m}.3	1.3	6.39 years	Semiregular (SRC)	
δ Ori (Mintaka)	Orion	John Herschel, 1834	2^{m}.14	2^{m}.26	0.12	5.73248 d	Eclipsing binary Algol type (EA/DM)	
R Ori	Orion	Hind, 1848	9^{m}.05	13^{m}.4	4.35	377 d	Mira variable (M)	
U Ori	Orion		4^{m}.8	13^{m}.0	8.5	368 d	Mira variable (M)	
W Ori	Orion		8^{m}.2 (p)	12^{m}.4 (p)	4.2	212 d	Semiregular (SRB)	
VV Ori	Orion		5^{m}.31	5^{m}.66	0.35	1.48538 d	Eclipsing binary Algol type (EA/KE:)	
CK Ori	Orion		5^{m}.9	7^{m}.1	1.2	~120 d	Semiregular (SR:)	
κ Pav	Pavo		3^{m}.91	4^{m}.78	0.87	9.09423 d	Type II Cepheid (CW)	
S Pav	Pavo		6^{m}.6	10^{m}.4	3.8	381 d	Semiregular (SRA)	
β Peg (Scheat)	Pegasus	Schmidt, 1847	2^{m}.31	2^{m}.74	0.43		LB	
ε Peg (Enif)	Pegasus		0^{m}.7	3^{m}.5	2.8		LC	
R Peg	Pegasus	Hind, 1848	6^{m}.9	13^{m}.8	6.9	378 d	Mira variable (M)	
X Peg	Pegasus		8^{m}.8	14^{m}.4	5.8	201 d	Mira variable (M)	
β Per (Algol)	Perseus	Geminiano Montanari, 1669	2^{m}.12	3^{m}.39	1.27	2.86730 d	Eclipsing binary Algol type (EA/SD) (prototype)	The Demon Star
DY Persei	Perseus						R Coronae Borealis / DY Persei / (prototype)	
φ Per (Dajiangjunbei)	Perseus		3^{m}.96	4^{m}.11	0.15	19.5 d	Gamma Cassiopeiae (GCAS)	
ρ Per	Perseus		3^{m}.30	4^{m}.0	0.70	~50 d	Semiregular (SRB)	
X Per	Perseus		6^{m}.03	7^{m}.0	0.97		Gamma Cassiopeiae (GCAS+XP)	
ζ Phe (Wurren)	Phoenix		3^{m}.91	4^{m}.42	0.51	1.66977 d	Eclipsing binary Algol type (EA/DM)	
R Pic	Pictor		6^{m}.35	10^{m}.1	3.75	171 d	Semiregular (SR)	
R Psc	Pisces	Hind, 1850	7^{m}.0	14^{m}.8	7.8	345 d	Mira variable (M)	
TX Psc	Pisces		4^{m}.79	5^{m}.20	0.42		LB	
L^{2} Pup	Puppis		2^{m}.6	6^{m}.2	3.6	141 d	Semiregular (SRB)	
RS Pup	Puppis		6^{m}.52	7^{m}.67	1.15	41.3876 d	Classical Cepheid (DCEP)	
T Pyx	Pyxis		7^{m}.0 (B)	15^{m}.77 (B)	8.77	(20 years)	recurrent nova (NR)	
S Scl	Sculptor		5^{m}.5	13^{m}.6	8.1	363 d	Mira variable (M)	
RR Sco	Scorpius		5^{m}.0	12^{m}.4	7.4	281 d	Mira variable (M)	
RS Sco	Scorpius		6^{m}.2	13^{m}.0	6.8	320 d	Mira variable (M)	
RT Sco	Scorpius		7^{m}.0	15^{m}.2	8.2	449 d	Mira variable (M)	
R Sct	Scutum	Pigott, 1795	4^{m}.2	8^{m}.6	4.4	146.5 d	RV Tauri variable (RVA)	
R Ser	Serpens	Harding, 1826	5^{m}.16	14^{m}.4	9.24	356 d	Mira variable (M)	
S Ser	Serpens	Harding, 1828	7^{m}.0	14^{m}.1	7.1	372 d	Mira variable (M)	
U Sge	Sagitta		6^{m}.45	9^{m}.28	2.83	3.38062 d	Eclipsing binary Algol type (EA/SD)	
WZ Sge	Sagitta		7^{m}.0 (B)	15^{m}.53 (B)	8.53	(33 years)	dwarf nova (UGSU+E+ZZ)	
RR Sgr	Sagittarius		5^{m}.4	14^{m}.0	8.6	336 d	Mira variable (M)	
R Sgr	Sagittarius		6^{m}.7	12^{m}.83	6.13	270 d	Mira variable (M)	
U Sgr	Sagittarius(in M25)		6^{m}.28	7^{m}.15	0.87	6.74523 d	Classical Cepheid (DCEP)	
RT Sgr	Sagittarius		6^{m}.0	14^{m}.1	8.1	306 d	Mira variable (M)	
RU Sgr	Sagittarius		6^{m}.0	13^{m}.8	7.8	240 d	Mira variable (M)	
RY Sgr	Sagittarius		5^{m}.8	14^{m}.0	8.2		R Coronae Borealis (RCB)	
VX Sgr	Sagittarius		6^{m}.52	14^{m}.0	7.08	732 d	Semiregular (SRC)	
λ Tau (Bibing)	Taurus	Baxendell, 1848	3^{m}.37	3^{m}.91	0.54	3.95295 d	Eclipsing binary Algol type (EA/DM)	
R Tau	Taurus	Hind, 1849	7^{m}.6	15^{m}.8	8.2	321 d	Mira variable (M)	
T Tau	Taurus		9^{m}.3	13^{m}.5	4.2		Orion variable (INT)	
SU Tau	Taurus		9^{m}.1	16^{m}.86	7.76		R Coronae Borealis (RCB)	
R Tri	Triangulum		5^{m}.4	12^{m}.6	7.2	267 d	Mira variable (M)	
R UMa	Ursa Major		6^{m}.5	13^{m}.7	7.2	302 d	Mira variable (M)	
T UMa	Ursa Major		6^{m}.6	13^{m}.5	6.9	257 d	Mira variable (M)	
U UMa	Ursa Major		6^{m}.20	6^{m}.25	0.05		-	
W UMa	Ursa Major		7^{m}.75	8^{m}.48	0.73	0.3336 d	Eclipsing binary W Ursae Majoris type (prototype)	
Z UMa	Ursa Major		6^{m}.2	9^{m}.4	3.2	196 d	Semiregular (SRB)	
α UMi (Polaris)	Ursa Minor		1^{m}.86	2^{m}.13	0.27	3.9696 d	Classical Cepheid (DCEPS)	
R Vir	Virgo	Harding, 1809	6^{m}.1	12^{m}.1	6.0	146 d	Mira variable (M)	
S Vir	Virgo		6^{m}.3	13^{m}.2	6.9	375 d	Mira variable (M)	

== See also ==
- Lists of astronomical objects
- Lists of stars
- List of semiregular variable stars
- List of stars that have unusual dimming periods
