= List of semiregular variable stars =

This is a list of semiregular variable stars. Variability ranges are taken from the General Catalogue of Variable Stars (GCVS) where these are visual magnitudes, otherwise from the International Variable Star Index (VSX). Spectral types are taken from the GCVS, which may differ from more recent MK spectral types but often defines a range.

Star	Constellation	Discovery	Maximum (m_{V})	Minimum (m_{V})	Range	Period (days)	Spectral Type	Type	Comment
θ Aps	Apus		4^{m}.65	6^{m}.20	1.55	119	M7III	SRb	
β And (Mirach)	Andromeda		2^{m}.01	2^{m}.10	0.09	119	M0IIIa	SRb	suspected
Z Aqr	Aquarius		7^{m}.4	10^{m}.2	2.8	136.6	M1e-M7III	SRa	
V Aql	Aquila		6^{m}.6	8^{m}.4	1.8	353	C5,4-C6,4(N6)	SRb	
W Boö (Alrumh)	Boötes		4^{m}.49	5^{m}.40	0.67	450	M2-M4III	SRb:	
VZ Cam	Camelopardalis		4^{m}.80	4^{m}.96	0.16	23.7	M4IIIa		Lb in GCVS
Y CVn (La Superba)	Canes Venatici		4^{m}.8	6^{m}.3	1.5	160	C5,4J(N3)	SRb	one of the reddest stars visible to the unaided eye
ρ Cas	Cassiopeia	L.D.Wells (1901)	4^{m}.1	6^{m}.2	2.1	320	F8pIa-K0pIa-0	SRd	
WZ Cas	Cassiopeia		6^{m}.3	8^{m}.5	2.2		C9,2JLi(N1p)	SRb	Visual double star, visible through binoculars
V806 Cen	Centaurus		4^{m}.16	4^{m}.26	0.1	12	M5III	SRb	
T Cen	Centaurus		5^{m}.5	9^{m}.0	3.5	90.44	K0:e-M4II:e	SRa	classified as RV Tauri variable by some
V810 Cen	Centaurus		4^{m}.95	5^{m}.12	0.17	130	F5-G0Ia-0	SRd	B1 Iab companion
μ Cep (Herschel's Garnet Star)	Cepheus	William Herschel (1782)	3^{m}.43	5^{m}.10	1.67	730	M2eIa	SRc	
SS Cep	Cepheus		6^{m}.5	7^{m}.7	1.2	90	M5III	SRb	
AR Cep	Cepheus		7^{m}.0	7^{m}.9	0.9	~364	M4III	SRb	
T Cet	Cetus		4^{m}.96	6^{m}.90	1.94	159	M5-6SIIe	SRc	
T Cnc	Cancer	Hind (1850)	7^{m}.6	10^{m}.5	2.9	482	C3,8-C5,5(R6-N6)	SRb	
X Cnc	Cancer		5^{m}.69	6^{m}.94	1.25	180	C5,4(N3)	SRb	
RR CrB	Corona Borealis		7^{m}.3	8^{m}.2	0.9	60.8	M3-M6	SRb	
W Cyg	Cygnus		5^{m}.10	6^{m}.83	1.73	131	M4e-M6e(Tc:)III	SRb	
AF Cyg	Cygnus		6^{m}.4	7^{m}.7	1.3	92.5	M5e-M7	SRb	
U Del	Delphinus		6^{m}.14	7^{m}.61	1.47	110	M5II-III	SRb	
EU Del	Delphinus		5^{m}.79	6^{m}.9	1.11	59.7	M6.4III	SRb	
η Gem (Propus)	Gemini	Schmidt (1865)	3^{m}.15	3^{m}.90	0.75	233	M3IIIab	SRa	also Algol eclipsing binary?
α Her (Rasalgethi)	Hercules	William Herschel (1759)	2^{m}.74	4^{m}.00	1.26		M5Ib-II	SRc	
30 Her	Hercules		4^{m}.3	6^{m}.3	2.0	89.2	M6III	SRb	
X Her	Hercules		5^{m}.8	7^{m}.0	1.1	95.0	M6e	SRb	
U Hya	Hydra		4^{m}.56	5^{m}.40	2.4	~450	C6.5,3(N2)(Tc)	SRb	
RX Lep	Lepus		5^{m}.0	7^{m}.4	2.4	~60	M6.2III	SRb	
σ Lib (Brachium)	Libra		3^{m}.20	3^{m}.46	0.26	20	M5III	SRb	
R Lyr	Lyra		3^{m}.88	5^{m}.00	1.12	~46	M5III	SRb	
α Ori (Betelgeuse)	Orion	John Herschel (1840)	0^{m}.0	1^{m}.3	1.3	2,335	M1-M2Ia-Ibe	SRc	
W Ori	Orion		5^{m}.5	6^{m}.9	4.2	212	C5,4(N5)	SRb	
CK Ori	Orion		5^{m}.9	7^{m}.1	1.2	~120	K2IIIe:		probably not variable
S Pav	Pavo		6^{m}.6	10^{m}.4	3.8	381	M7IIe-M8III	SRa	
GZ Peg	Pegasus		4^{m}.95	5^{m}.23	0.28	92.66	M4SIII	SRa	
ρ Per	Perseus		3^{m}.30	4^{m}.00	0.70	~50	M4IIb-IIIa	SRb	
R Pic	Pictor		6^{m}.35	10^{m}.10	3.75	171	M1IIe-M4IIe		
L^{2} Puppis	Puppis		2^{m}.6	6^{m}.2	3.6	141	M5IIIe-M6IIIe	SRb	
VX Sgr	Sagittarius		6^{m}.52	14^{m}.00	7.08	732	M4eIa-M10eIa	SRc	one of the largest stars known
η Scl	Sculptor	Cousins/Stoy (1962)	4^{m}.8	4^{m}.9	0.1		M4IIIa	SRb	
τ^{4} Ser	Serpens		5^{m}.89	7^{m}.07	1.18	100	M5IIb-IIIa	SRb	
CE Tau	Taurus		4^{m}.23	4^{m}.54	0.31	165	M2Iab-Ib	SRc	
SS Vir	Virgo		6^{m}.0	9^{m}.6	3.6	364.14	C6,3e(Ne)	SRa	
SV UMa	Ursa Major		9^{m}.1	10^{m}.6	3.2	76	G1Ibe-K3Iap	SRd	
Z UMa	Ursa Major		6^{m}.2	9^{m}.4	3.2	196	M5IIIe	SRb	
RR UMi	Ursa Minor		4^{m}.44	4^{m}.85	0.41	43.3	M5III	SRb	

== See also ==
- Lists of astronomical objects
- Lists of stars
- List of stars that have unusual dimming periods
- Variable star designation
