= V356 Sagittarii =

Star system in the constellation Sagittarius

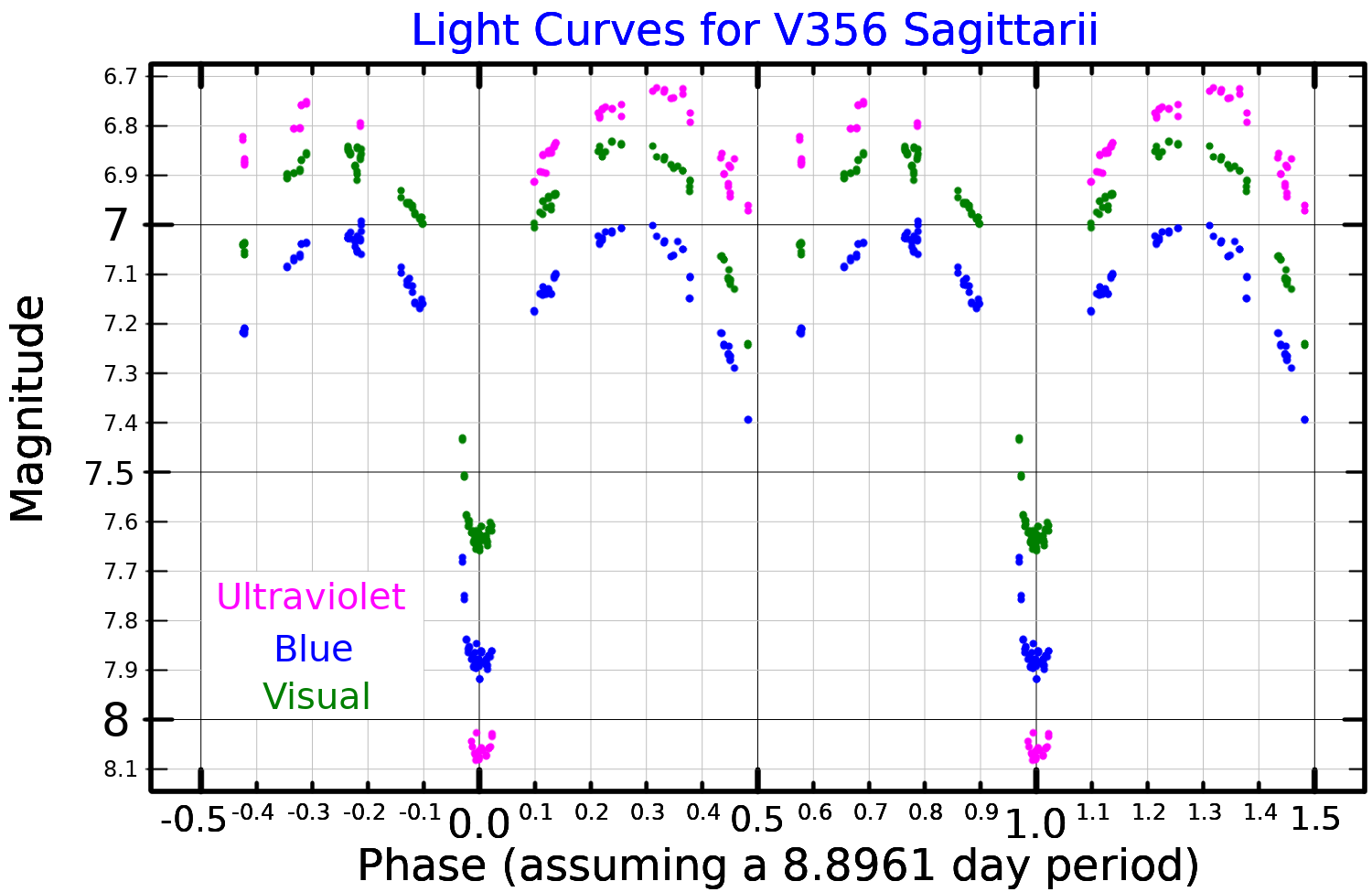
- Light curves for V356 Sagittarii, in three photometric bands. Plotted from data published by Wilson and Woodward (1995).

Observation data Epoch J2000 Equinox ICRS
- Constellation: Sagittarius
- Right ascension: 18^{h} 47^{m} 52.331^{s}
- Declination: −20° 16′ 28.24″
- Apparent magnitude (V): 6.84; Min I: 7.66; Min II: 7.24

Characteristics
- Spectral type: B3V + A2II
- B−V color index: 0.120±0.029
- Variable type: Detached Algol(?)

Astrometry
| Radial velocity (R_{v}) | 7.0±4.4 km/s |
| Proper motion (μ) | RA: +0.525 mas/yr Dec.: −4.847 mas/yr |
| Parallax (π) | 1.4783±0.0289 mas |
| Distance | 2,210 ± 40 ly (680 ± 10 pc) |

Orbit
| Period (P) | 8.896106 d |
| Eccentricity (e) | 0.01566±0.01360 |
| Argument of periastron (ω) (secondary) | 288.71851±0.42683° |
| Semi-amplitude (K_{1}) (primary) | 72.17896±1.25080 km/s |
| Semi-amplitude (K_{2}) (secondary) | 190 km/s |

Details

Primary
| Mass | 11.0 M_{☉} |
| Radius | 9.07 R_{☉} |
| Surface gravity (log g) | 3.96±0.10 cgs |
| Temperature | 16,500±750 K |
| Rotational velocity (v sin i) | 350 km/s |

Secondary
| Mass | 3.0 M_{☉} |
| Radius | 13.2 R_{☉} |
| Surface gravity (log g) | 2.82±0.10 cgs |
| Temperature | 8,600±300 K |
| Rotational velocity (v sin i) | 90 km/s |

Other designations
- V356 Sgr, BD−20°5268, GC 25739, HD 173787, HIP 92235, SAO 187294, PPM 268914

Database references
| SIMBAD | data |

V356 Sagittarii is an eclipsing binary star system in the southern constellation of Sagittarius, abbreviated V356 Sgr. It has a peak apparent visual magnitude of 6.84, which decreases to 7.66 during the primary eclipse and 7.24 with the secondary eclipse. Based on parallax measurements, this system is located at a distance of approximately 2,210 light years from the Sun.

In 1929, the Japanese astronomer Kanda discovered that the star, then called BD-20°5268, is a variable star. It was given its variable star designation, V356 Sagittarii, in 1930.

This is a double-lined spectroscopic binary system with an orbital period of 8.896 days. It is a massive, interacting system with a circular orbit, where the secondary component has filled its Roche lobe and is transferring matter to its companion. The primary is a B-type main-sequence star with a stellar classification of B3V. It was originally the lower mass component, but now has about 11 times the mass of the Sun. The secondary is an evolved supergiant star with a present-day class of A2II. It has been stripped of much of its original mass, leaving behind the exposed core of a star. The transfer of matter is creating an accretion disk in orbit around the primary.

At least some of the material stripped from the current secondary component has likely been lost from the system. A relatively small change in the orbital period has been observed, but the period is fairly stable over time, which may mean the mass transfer is intermittent. Ultraviolet emission has been observed with the FUSE space observatory, indicating the presence of hot circumstellar matter. This emission shows little variation during a total eclipse, suggesting the material lies perpendicular to the accretion disk. This could represent a bipolar jet of matter from the primary.
