= U Cephei =

Eclipsing binary star

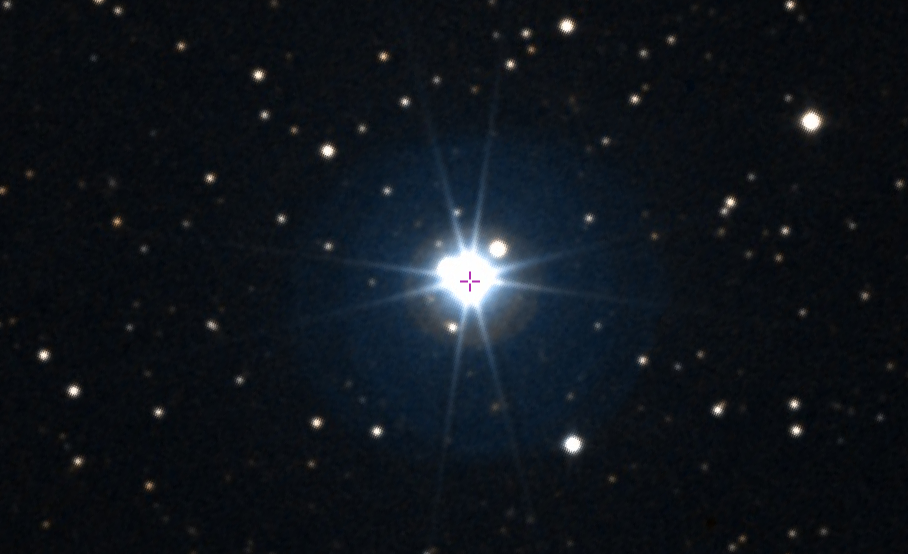
- U Cephei, as seen during the Digitized Sky Survey

Observation data Epoch J2000 Equinox J2000
- Constellation: Cepheus
- Right ascension: 01^{h} 02^{m} 18.4440^{s}
- Declination: +81° 52′ 32.082″
- Apparent magnitude (V): 6.92

Characteristics
- Spectral type: B7/8V + G5/8III-IV
- Variable type: Eclipsing binary

Astrometry
Radial velocity (R_{v})	5.0 km/s
Proper motion (μ)	RA: 23.811±0.027 mas/yr Dec.: −4.381±0.025 mas/yr
Parallax (π)	5.1939±0.0238 mas
Distance	628 ± 3 ly (192.5 ± 0.9 pc)

Orbit
Primary	U Cep A (B-type star)
Companion	U Cep B (G-type star)
Period (P)	2.4928 d
Semi-major axis (a)	14.7 R_{☉}
Eccentricity (e)	0
Inclination (i)	83°
Semi-amplitude (K_{1}) (primary)	120 km/s
Semi-amplitude (K_{2}) (secondary)	180 km/s

Details

U Cep A (B-type star)
Mass	4.2 M_{☉}
Radius	2.9 R_{☉}
Temperature	13600 K

U Cep B (G-type star)
Mass	2.8 M_{☉}
Radius	4.7 R_{☉}
Temperature	4950 K

Other designations
- BD+81° 25, HD 5679, HIP 4843, SAO 168

Database references
SIMBAD	data

U Cephei is an eclipsing binary star discovered in 1880. It consists of a blue-white main sequence star of spectral type B7/8V that is eclipsed every two and a half days by a less bright giant of type G5/8III-IV. The drop in brightness lasts 4 hours and the system sees its apparent magnitude increase from 6.7 to 9.2. The total eclipse then lasts 2 hours before an increase in brightness for 4 hours. The two stars, separated by less than 10,000,000 kilometres (6,200,000 mi), exchange matter. This transfer towards the blue giant caused the system's orbital period to lengthen by 4 minutes during the 20th century. U Cephei is one of the brightest eclipsing binaries. Located near the north celestial pole, it can be monitored continuously with a 60 millimeter telescope.

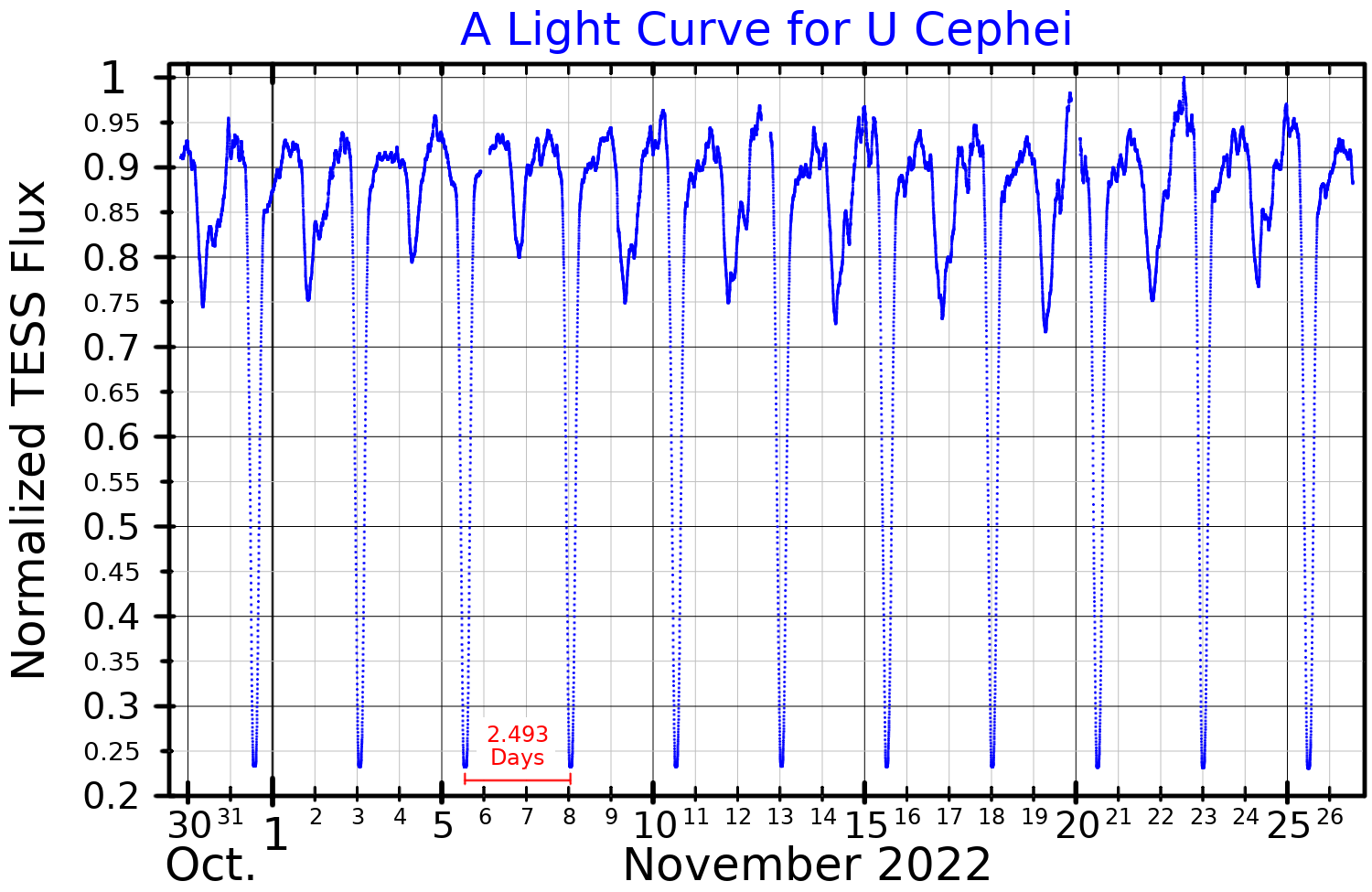
A light curve for U Cephei, plotted from TESS data. The 2.493 day eclipse period is shown in red.

The system has two visual companions listed in the double and multiple star catalogs. U Cephei B is a twelfth magnitude star that, as of 2016, was located at an angular distance of 13.9 arcseconds and at a position angle of 63° from U Cephei A. It exhibits a common proper motion with the system, which indicates that it is physically linked to it. U Cephei C is another twelfth magnitude star, but it is only a purely optical double and its proximity to the system is a coincidence.

== See also ==
- AR Cephei
- List of variable stars
