= HD 185351 =

Star in the constellation Cygnus

- Location of HD 185351 (circled)

Observation data Epoch J2000.0 Equinox J2000.0
- Constellation: Cygnus
- Right ascension: 19^{h} 36^{m} 37.977^{s}
- Declination: +44° 41′ 41.76″
- Apparent magnitude (V): 5.17

Characteristics
- Evolutionary stage: Red-giant branch
- Spectral type: G8.5IIIb Fe−0.5
- B−V color index: 0.928±0.001

Astrometry
Radial velocity (R_{v})	−5.422±0.006 km/s
Proper motion (μ)	RA: −95.016 mas/yr Dec.: −104.858 mas/yr
Parallax (π)	24.261±0.0573 mas
Distance	134.4 ± 0.3 ly (41.22 ± 0.10 pc)
Absolute magnitude (M_{V})	2.13

Details
Mass	1.58^{+0.04}_{−0.02} M_{☉}
Radius	4.946±0.043 R_{☉}
Luminosity	14.008±0.133 L_{☉}
Surface gravity (log g)	3.288±0.046 cgs
Temperature	5,025±22 K
Metallicity [Fe/H]	−0.02±0.07 dex
Rotational velocity (v sin i)	2.14±0.23 km/s
Age	2.32^{+0.04}_{−0.07} Gyr

Other designations
- BD+44°3185, HD 185351, HIP 96459, HR 7468, SAO 48649, PPM 58585

Database references
SIMBAD	data

HD 185351 is a star in the constellation of Cygnus, the swan. With an apparent visual magnitude of 5.17, it is faintly visible to the naked eye on a dark night. Based on parallax measurements, HD 185351 is located at a distance of 134 light years from the Sun. It is drifting closer with a heliocentric radial velocity of −5.4 km/s.

This was the third brightest star in the view field of the Kepler space telescope, with only θ Cyg and CH Cyg being brighter. The resulting data was used to measure asteroseismic oscillations that yielded a mass estimate for HD 185351, after incorporating interferometric and spectroscopic observations. The result is consistent with the value of 1.60 M_{☉} provided by a refined stellar model. In the past, the star was likely an A-type main-sequence star similar to Procyon. Hence, it is sometimes dubbed a "retired A star".

HD 185351 has a stellar classification of G8.5IIIb Fe−0.5, suggesting this is a late G-type giant star with a mild underabundance of iron compared to similar stars. It has expanded to nearly five times the radius of the Sun and is radiating 14 times the Sun's luminosity. The star has an estimated age of 2.3 billion years and is spinning with a projected rotational velocity of 2 km/s.

As of 2011, searches for planetary companions using Doppler spectroscopy were unsuccessful.
