= SS Cephei =

Variable star in the constellation Cepheus

Observation data Epoch J2000 Equinox ICRS
- Constellation: Cepheus
- Right ascension: 03^{h} 49^{m} 30.0153^{s}
- Declination: +80° 19′ 20.902″
- Apparent magnitude (V): 6.9 - 7.9

Characteristics
- Evolutionary stage: AGB
- Spectral type: M5III
- Variable type: SRb

Astrometry
Radial velocity (R_{v})	−46.87±0.09 km/s
Proper motion (μ)	RA: −4.911 mas/yr Dec.: 12.062 mas/yr
Parallax (π)	3.9187±0.1886 mas
Distance	830 ± 40 ly (260 ± 10 pc)
Absolute magnitude (M_{V})	+0.13

Details
Mass	3.7 M_{☉}
Radius	239 R_{☉}
Luminosity	5,021 L_{☉}
Surface gravity (log g)	2.33 cgs
Temperature	3,830 K
Metallicity [Fe/H]	−0.32 dex

Other designations
- BD+79°110, HD 22689, HIP 17881, SAO 594

Database references
SIMBAD	data

SS Cephei is a semiregular variable star in the constellation Cepheus. It is of spectral type M5III, and has an estimated temperature of about 3,700 K. The star is about 830 light-years (260 parsecs) from Earth. The brightness of SS Cephei varies between magnitude 6.9 and 7.9.

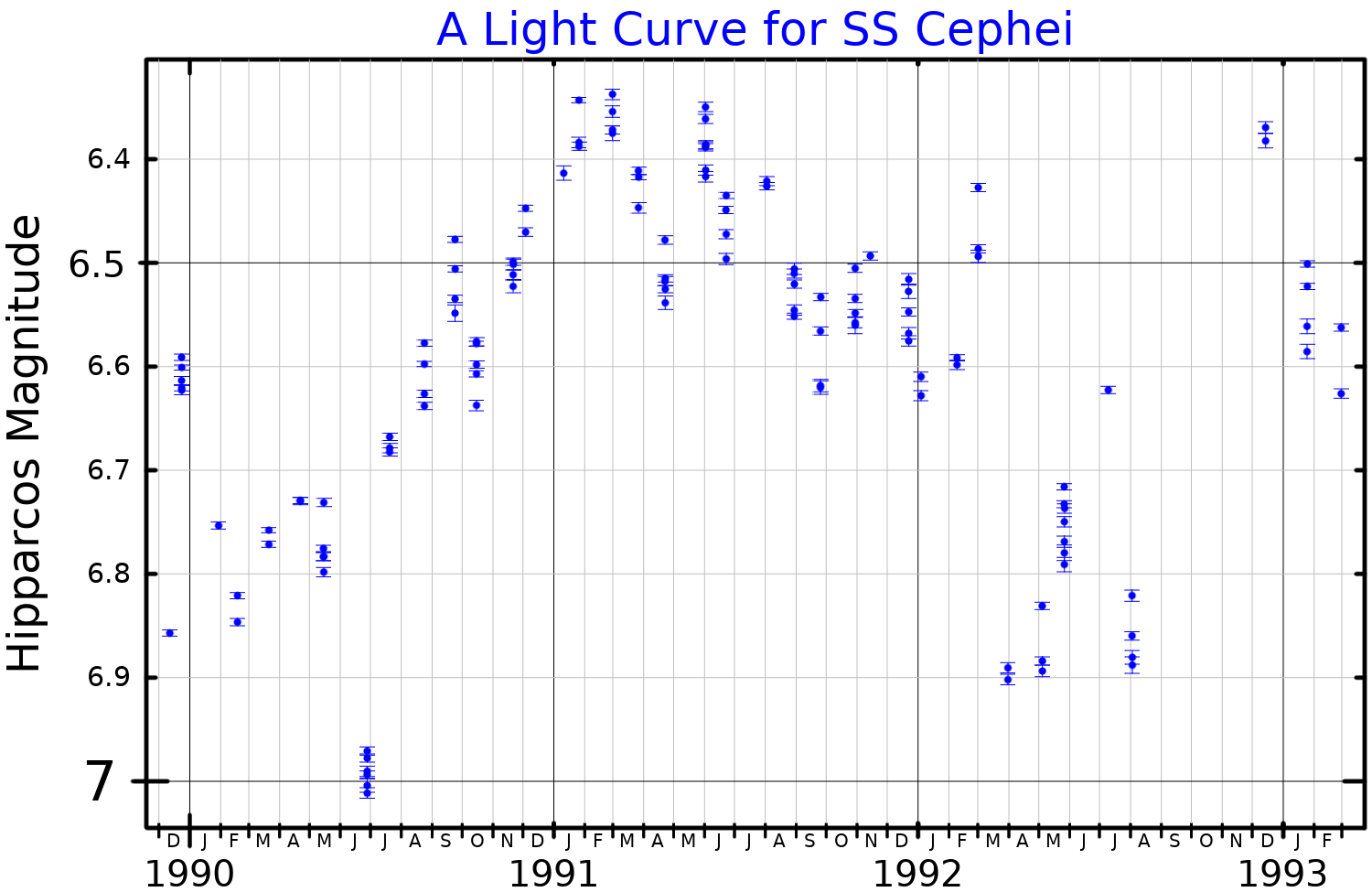
A light curve for SS Cephei, plotted from Hipparcos data

== See also ==
- S Cephei
- List of variable stars
