= Edwin Forrest Sawyer =

American amateur astronomer

Edwin Forrest Sawyer Esq.
- Born: 16 May 1849; Boston
- Died: 14 October 1937 (aged 88)
- Occupations: Banker, Astronomer
- Years active: 1865-1915

Edwin Forrest Sawyer (16 May 1849-14 October 1937) was a 19th-century American amateur astronomer, best known for his observations of meteors. His observations of meteors are some of the most complete, spanning 1877–1915. He worked with Alexander Stewart Herschel, William Frederick Denning and Seth Carlo Chandler.

Sawyer's work mostly focused on meteor showers. Along with William Frederick Denning, he observed the Leonids of 1866–1868. He kept detailed records of the 1872 Andromedids. In 1880, Sawyer published the first study of the July Aquariids.

In 1891, Sawyer made observations of the variable stars 1072 Persei, 2100 Orionis, 4940 Hydrae, 5667 Coronae, 5912 Herculis, 6189 Ophiuchi, 6733 Scuti, and 7120 Cygni. In May 1892, Sawyer published a catalogue of 3,415 southern stars. In 1898, Sawyer studied the Leonid meteor shower in greater detail. He noted that the meteors were of a distinctive green color. Also during this study, he saw recorded observations of ten previously known asteroids.

In 1896, he discovered a new variable star in Gemini, with a magnitude changing between 6.8 and 7.6 every eight days.

He retired in 1915, and died on 14 October 1937, at the age of 88.
