= R Canis Majoris =

Binary star system in the constellation Canis Major

- Location of R CMa (circled)

Observation data Epoch J2000.0 Equinox ICRS
- Constellation: Canis Major
- Right ascension: 07^{h} 19^{m} 28.18202^{s}
- Declination: −16° 23′ 42.8773″
- Apparent magnitude (V): 5.70 - 6.34

Characteristics
- Spectral type: F0V + G8IV
- U−B color index: +0.01
- B−V color index: +0.34
- Variable type: Algol

Astrometry
| Radial velocity (R_{v}) | −39.0 km/s |
| Proper motion (μ) | RA: +165.37 mas/yr Dec.: −136.18 mas/yr |
| Parallax (π) | 23.38±0.54 mas |
| Distance | 140 ± 3 ly (42.8 ± 1.0 pc) |
| Absolute magnitude (M_{V}) | +2.57 |

Details

primary
| Mass | 1.67 M_{☉} |
| Radius | 1.78 R_{☉} |
| Luminosity | 8.2 L_{☉} |
| Surface gravity (log g) | 4.16 cgs |
| Temperature | 7,300 K |
| Rotational velocity (v sin i) | 78.3±3.9 km/s |

secondary
| Mass | 0.22 M_{☉} |
| Radius | 1.22 R_{☉} |
| Luminosity | 0.49 L_{☉} |
| Surface gravity (log g) | 3.60 cgs |
| Temperature | 4,350 K |

tertiary
| Mass | 0.8 M_{☉} |
| Radius | 0.83 R_{☉} |
| Luminosity | 0.4 L_{☉} |
| Surface gravity (log g) | 4.50 cgs |

Other designations
- R Canis Majoris, BD−16°1898, HR 2788, HD 57167, HIP 35487, SAO 152724, GC 9758

Database references
| SIMBAD | data |

R Canis Majoris is an eclipsing interacting binary star system in the constellation Canis Major. It varies from magnitude 5.7 to 6.34. The system is unusual in the low mass ratio (ie. big mass difference) between the main two components and shortness of the orbital period. It is faintly visible to the naked eye of an observer with very good observing conditions.

== Variability ==
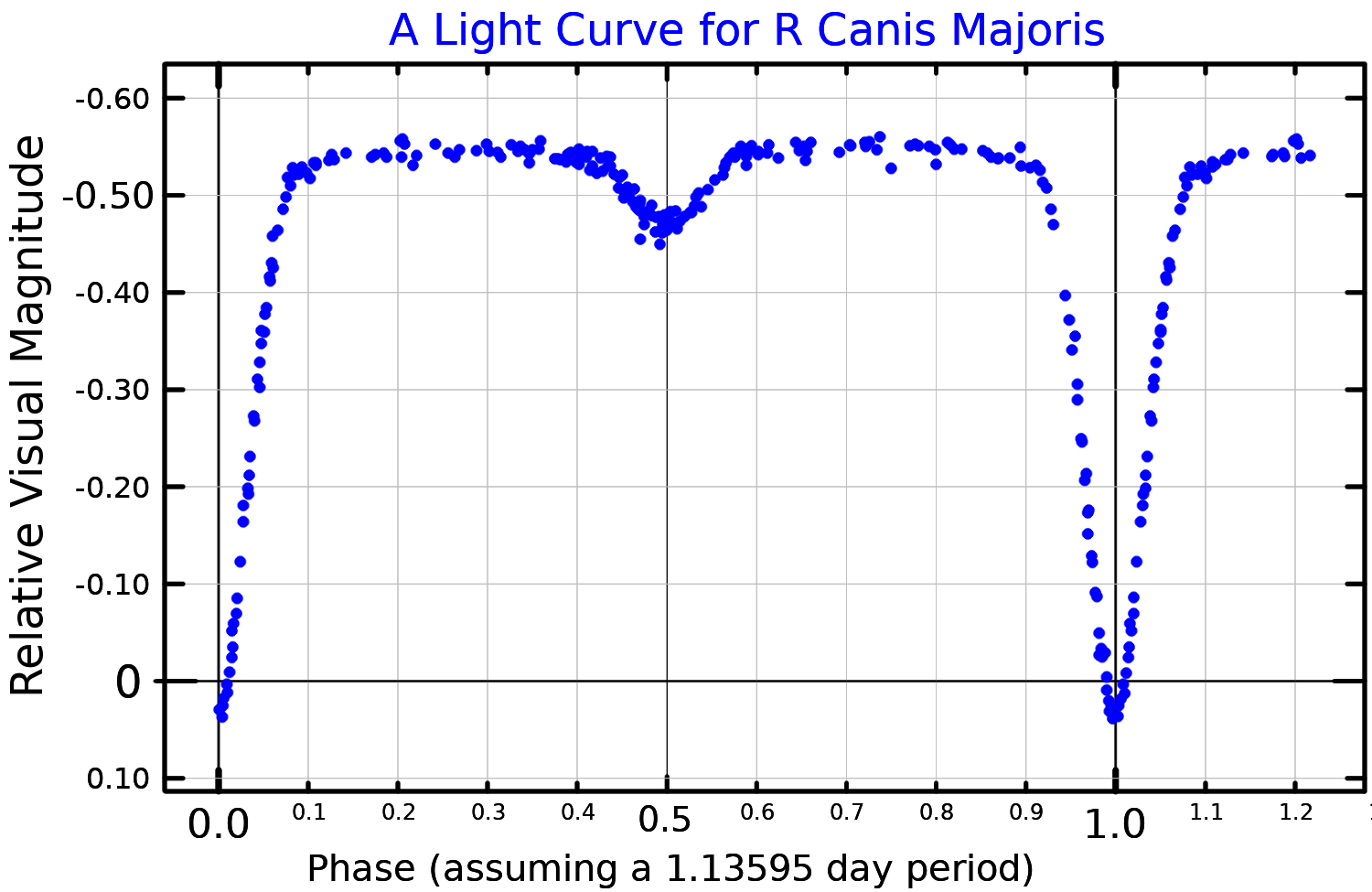
A visual band light curve for R Canis Majoris, adapted from Shobbrook (2005)

In 1887, Edwin Forrest Sawyer discovered that the star, then generally referred to as 155 Canis Majoris (after its listing in Uranometria Argentina), is a variable star. It appears with its variable star designation, R Canis Majoris, in Annie Jump Cannon's Second catalogue of variable stars, published in 1907.

Eclipse timings for R Canis Majoris have been being measured since 1887, and whilst at present the time period appears constant at 1.1359 days, periodic quasi-sinusoidal variations of the eclipse arrival times have been taking place with a periodicity of around 93 years. This has led to the suggestion that there exists a third non-eclipsing body in the system whose gravitational pull is responsible for these variations.

== Interacting binary star ==
R Canis Majoris is thought to be an interacting binary star. The secondary star, originally the more massive of the two, has evolved away from the main sequence, expanded, and exceeded its Roche lobe. The primary has stripped away mass from the secondary, with much of it being lost completely from the system. The secondary now has a very reduced mass relative to its temperature and luminosity, while the primary has gained helium-rich material and become hotter and more luminous.

Reanalysis of the system using high-resolution spectroscopy yields its two main components to have masses 1.67±0.08 and 0.22±0.07 times that of the Sun respectively and radii 1.78±0.03 and 1.22±0.07 times that of the Sun respectively. Their surface temperatures are 7,300 K and 4,350 K. A third star in the system is very faint, presumed to be an orange dwarf. A tentative orbit has been derived with a period of 102 years. The third star has a mass 80% that of the Sun and a radius around 83% that of the Sun.
