= U Sagittarii =

Star in the constellation Sagittarius

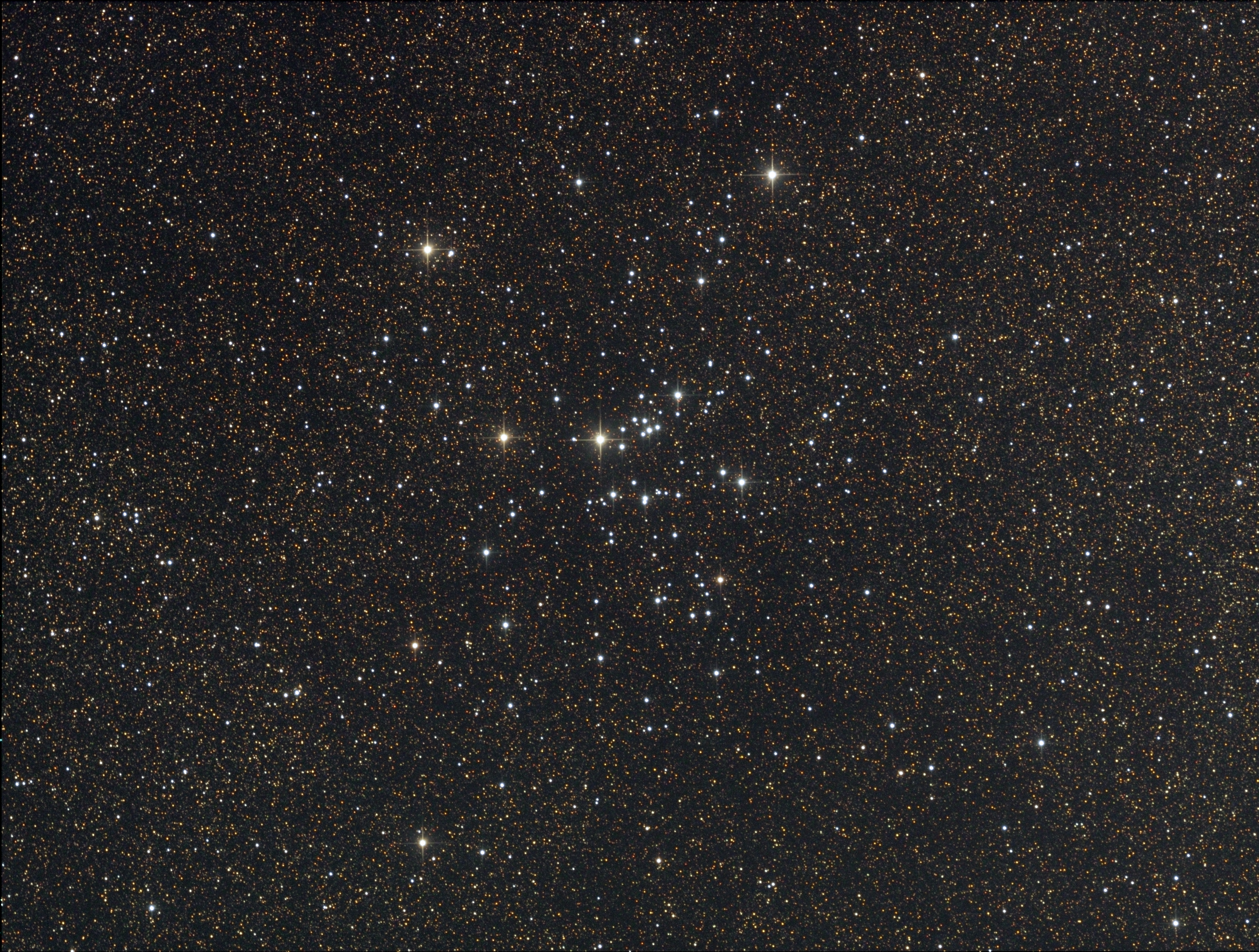
- U Sagittarii (center) is the brightest star in the open cluster Messier 25.

Observation data Epoch J2000 Equinox J2000
- Constellation: Sagittarius
- Right ascension: 18^{h} 31^{m} 53.332^{s}
- Declination: −19° 07′ 30.26″
- Apparent magnitude (V): 6.28 to 7.15

Characteristics
- Evolutionary stage: Supergiant
- Spectral type: G1Ib
- U−B color index: +0.85
- B−V color index: +1.06
- Variable type: δ Cep

Astrometry
Radial velocity (R_{v})	2.2±0.3 km/s
Proper motion (μ)	RA: −1.795 mas/yr Dec.: −6.127 mas/yr
Parallax (π)	1.5693±0.0224 mas
Distance	2,080 ± 30 ly (637 ± 9 pc)
Absolute magnitude (M_{V})	−3.86 to −3.10

Details
Mass	6.54 to 6.64 M_{☉}
Radius	55.5 to 56.3 R_{☉}
Luminosity	4,370 to 4,650 L_{☉}
Surface gravity (log g)	0.99 cgs
Temperature	5,802 K
Metallicity [Fe/H]	0.17 dex
Rotational velocity (v sin i)	15.4 km/s
Age	91 Myr

Other designations
- U Sgr, BD−19°5047, GC 25287, HD 170764, HIP 90836, HR 6947, SAO 161571, WDS J18319-1908A

Database references
SIMBAD	data

U Sagittarii is a variable star in the southern constellation of Sagittarius, abbreviated U Sgr. It is a classical Cepheid variable that ranges in brightness from an apparent visual magnitude of 6.28 down to 7.15, with a pulsation period of 6.745226 days. At its brightest, this star is dimly visible to the naked eye. The distance to this star is approximately 2,080 light years based on parallax measurements, and it is drifting further away with a radial velocity of 2 km/s.

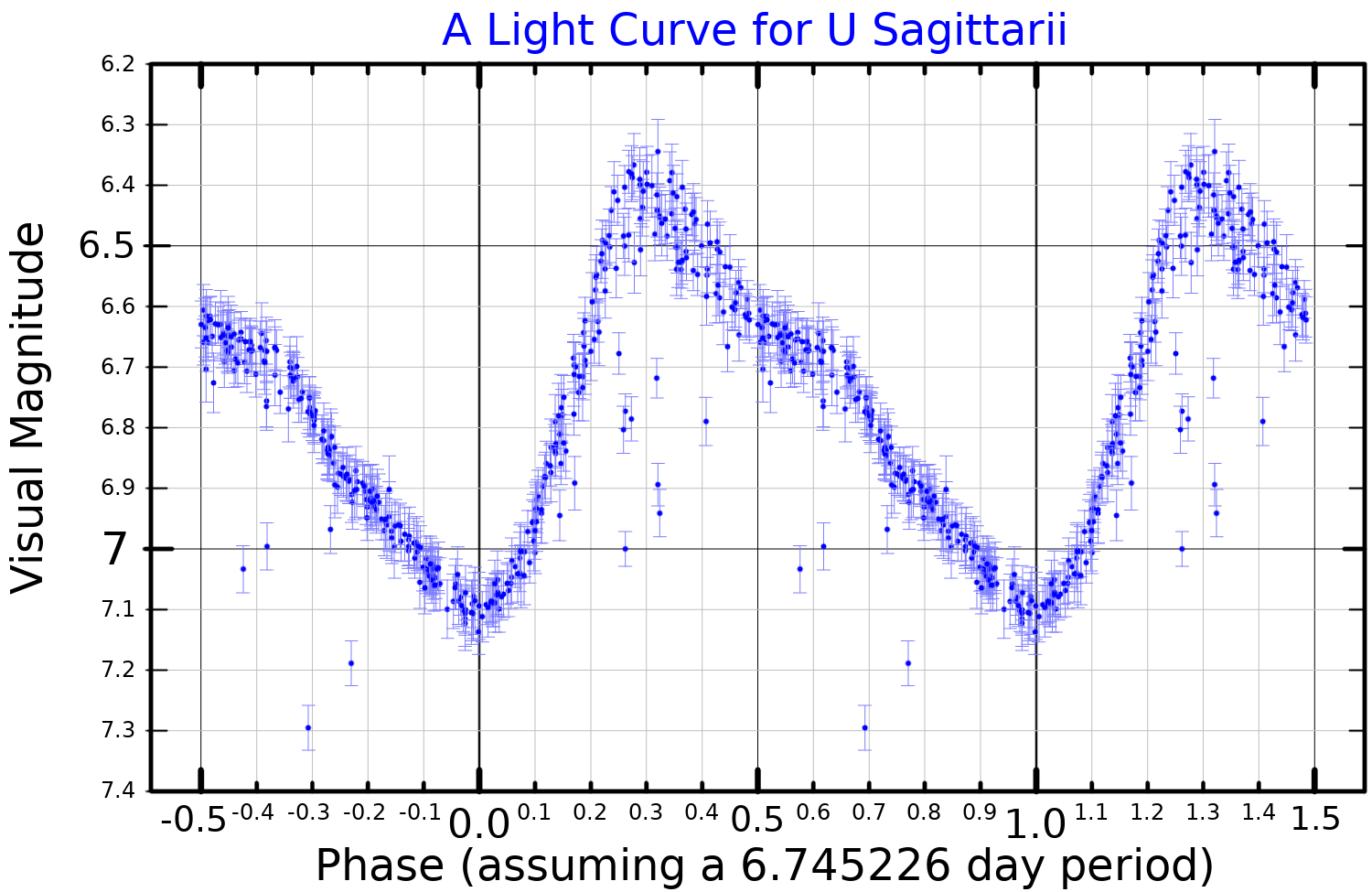
A light curve for U Sagittarii, plotted from ASAS data

The variability of this star was announced by J. Schmidt in 1866, who found a preliminary period of 6.74784 days. It was later determined to be a variable of the Cepheid type. In 1925, P. Doig assumed that the star is a member of the open cluster Messier 25 (M25), but actual evidence of its membership would not be available until 1932 when P. Hayford made radial velocity measurements of the cluster. Membership in this cluster is now reasonably established, and as such this Cepheid serves as one of the anchors for the cosmic distance scale since the distance to the cluster can be determined independently from the star. Indeed, new research indicates U Sgr's host cluster (M25) may constitute a ternary (triple) star cluster together with NGC 6716 and Collinder 394.

This is an evolved G-type supergiant star with a typical stellar classification of G1Ib. It appears to be making its third traversal of the instability strip with its period changing at the rate of +0.073±0.010 s·yr^{−1}. Elemental abundances are similar to those in the Sun. It has an estimated 6.6 times the mass of the Sun and 56 times the Sun's radius. The star is radiating over 4,000 times the Sun's luminosity from its photosphere at an effective temperature of 5,802 K.
