= Interacting binary star =

Double stars that show a significant interaction between their components

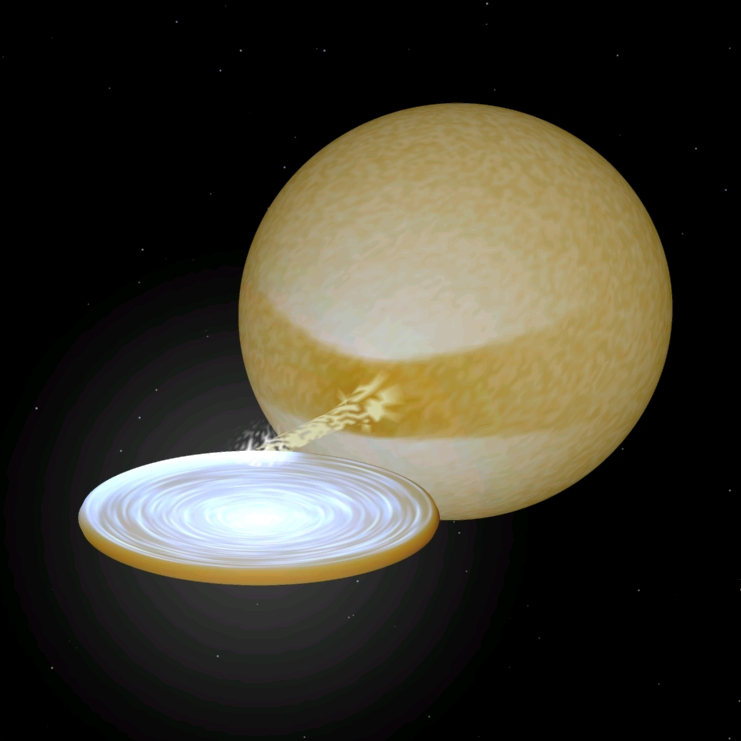
Artist's impression of a low-mass X-ray binary (LMXB): an evolved low-mass yellow sub-giant star transfers mass to a neutron star. Because the accretor is a compact object, an accretion disc forms, which is the source of the X-rays. Source.

An Interacting binary star is a type of binary star in which one or both of the component stars has filled or exceeded its Roche lobe, also known as a semidetached binary. When this happens, material from one star (the donor star) will flow towards the other star (the accretor). If the accretor is a compact star, an accretion disk may form. The physical conditions in such a system can be complex and highly variable, and they are common sources of cataclysmic outbursts.

A common type of interacting binary star is one in which one of the components is a compact object which is well within its Roche lobe, while the other is an evolved giant star. If the compact object is a white dwarf, then accretion of material from the evolved star onto the white dwarf's surface may result in its mass increasing to beyond the Chandrasekhar limit. This can lead to runaway thermonuclear reactions and the massive explosion of the star in a Type I supernova.

An example of such a binary star is R Canis Majoris, in which it is thought that the secondary star has exceeded its Roche lobe and transferred mass to the primary star. This has resulted in the early evolution of the secondary star onto the subgiant star branch, and in exposure of helium-rich material on the surface of the primary, causing it to burn brighter and have a higher effective temperature than would usually be expected for a star of its mass.

In close binary systems where the first Roche lobe overflow of the primary occurs prior to helium flash, the shedding of mass can leave behind a helium white dwarf with a mass as low as 0.1 M_{☉}. The same scenario works when the companion is a millisecond pulsar. Evolutionary models of binaries suggest that a majority of such closely orbiting white dwarf companions will be helium–based.

== See also ==
- Classical nova
- Contact binary
