= ST Cephei =

Star in the constellation of Cepheus

- ST Cephei, as seen during the Digitized Sky Survey

Observation data Epoch J2000 Equinox ICRS
- Constellation: Cepheus
- Right ascension: 22^{h} 30^{m} 10.73791^{s}
- Declination: +57° 00′ 03.0712″
- Apparent magnitude (V): 7.75 - 8.90

Characteristics
- Spectral type: M2Ia-Iab
- B−V color index: 2.28
- Variable type: LC

Astrometry
Radial velocity (R_{v})	−66.6 km/s
Proper motion (μ)	RA: −3.568 mas/yr Dec.: −3.096 mas/yr
Parallax (π)	0.2162±0.0239 mas
Distance	approx. 15,000 ly (approx. 4,600 pc)
Absolute magnitude (M_{V})	−3.73

Details
Mass	9 M_{☉}
Radius	175 - 290 R_{☉}
Luminosity	12,246 L_{☉}
Surface gravity (log g)	0.92 cgs
Temperature	4200 K
Metallicity [Fe/H]	0.02 dex

Other designations
- BD+56°2793, HD 239978, SAO 34529

Database references
SIMBAD	data

ST Cephei (ST Cep), also known as BD+56°2793, is a red supergiant and a variable star located in the constellation Cepheus. It has a variable apparent magnitude between 7.75 and 8.90, and is over a hundred times the radius of the Sun.

== Distance ==
ST Cephei is very far from the Solar System, and its parallax was not measured by the Hipparcos satellite. Its membership in the Cepheus OB2-B stellar association allows its distance to be estimated at 830 parsecs, or 2,715 light years.

== Characteristics ==
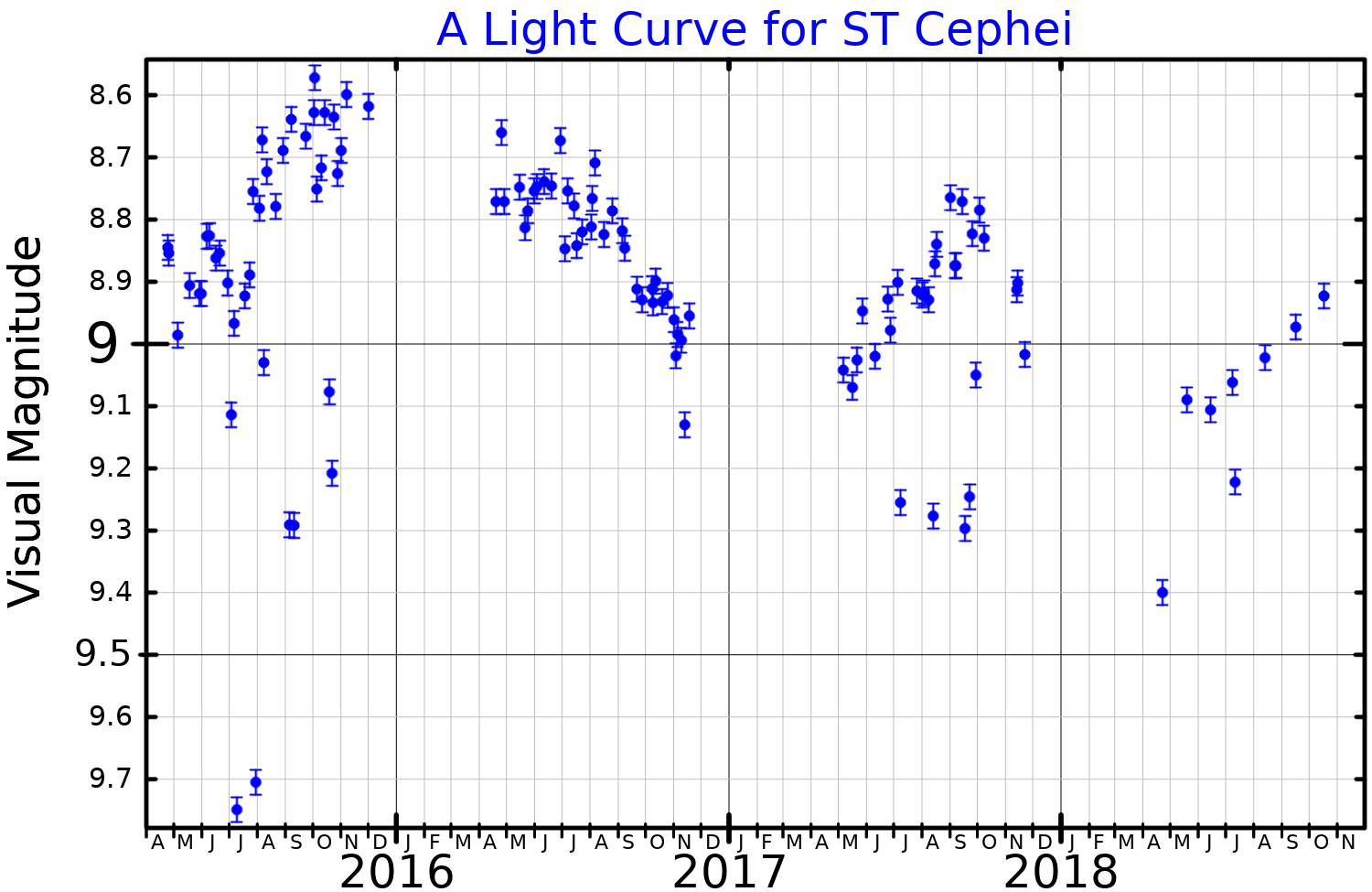
A visual band light curve for ST Cephei, plotted from ASAS-SN data

ST Cephei is a red supergiant of spectral type M3I—previously cataloged as M2I—with an effective temperature of 3,600 Kelvin. It is a large supergiant; estimates of its radius range from 175 to 290 solar radii. Considering an intermediate radius between both values, if it were in the place of the Sun, its surface would extend to the Earth's orbit. Despite this, its size is far from the two known hypergiants in this constellation, μ Cephei and VV Cephei.

The bolometric luminosity of ST Cephei is 8,400 times greater than that of the Sun. It has a mass 9 times greater than the Sun, at the limit from which stars end their lives by exploding as supernovae. Like other analogous supergiants, it loses mass; Its loss of stellar mass—in the form of dust, since the atomic and molecular gas could not be evaluated—is quantified at 2.5×10^{−9} M_{☉}/year.

In 1910 it was announced that Evelyn Leland had discovered that the star is a variable star. That same year it was given its variable star designation, ST Cephei. Listed as an LC irregular variable star, the brightness of ST Cephei varies by about two magnitudes, with no period recognized.

== See also ==
- List of largest stars
- List of variable stars
- MY Cephei
