= S Cephei =

Variable star in the constellation Cepheus

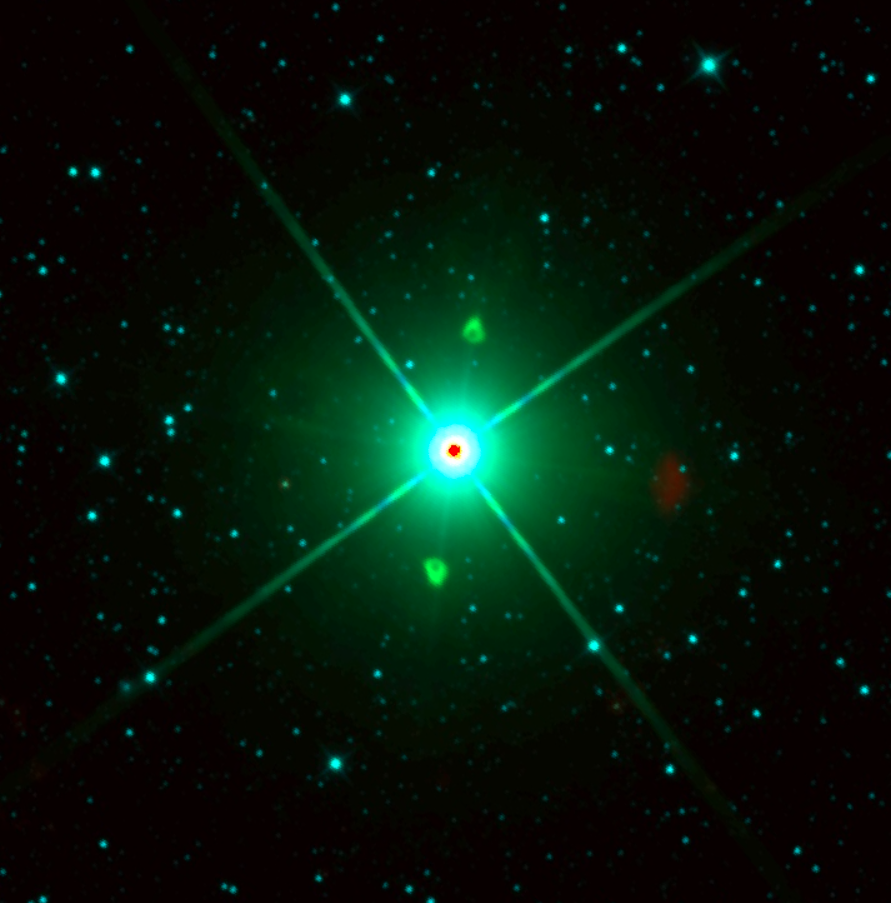
- S Cephei, as seen by WISE (false colour infrared)

Observation data Epoch J2000 Equinox J2000
- Constellation: Cepheus
- Right ascension: 21^{h} 35^{m} 12.8233^{s}
- Declination: +78° 37′ 28.185″
- Apparent magnitude (V): 6.6 - 12.5

Characteristics
- Evolutionary stage: AGB
- Spectral type: C7,3e
- Variable type: Mira

Astrometry
| Proper motion (μ) | RA: 8.278 mas/yr Dec.: 0.748 mas/yr |
| Parallax (π) | 2.0452±0.0697 mas |
| Distance | 1,590 ± 50 ly (490 ± 20 pc) |

Details
| Mass | 5.4 M_{☉} |
| Radius | 254 R_{☉} |
| Luminosity | 5,417 L_{☉} |
| Surface gravity (log g) | 3.61 cgs |
| Temperature | 4,032 K |
| Metallicity [Fe/H] | −0.54 dex |

Other designations
- BD+77°827, HD 206362, HIP 106583, SAO 10100

Database references
| SIMBAD | data |

S Cephei (S Cep), also designated as HD 206362, is a carbon star and Mira-type variable in the constellation Cepheus. Based on the measurement of its annual parallax by the Gaia satellite, the star is approximately ~1,590 ly (~490 pc) away from Earth.

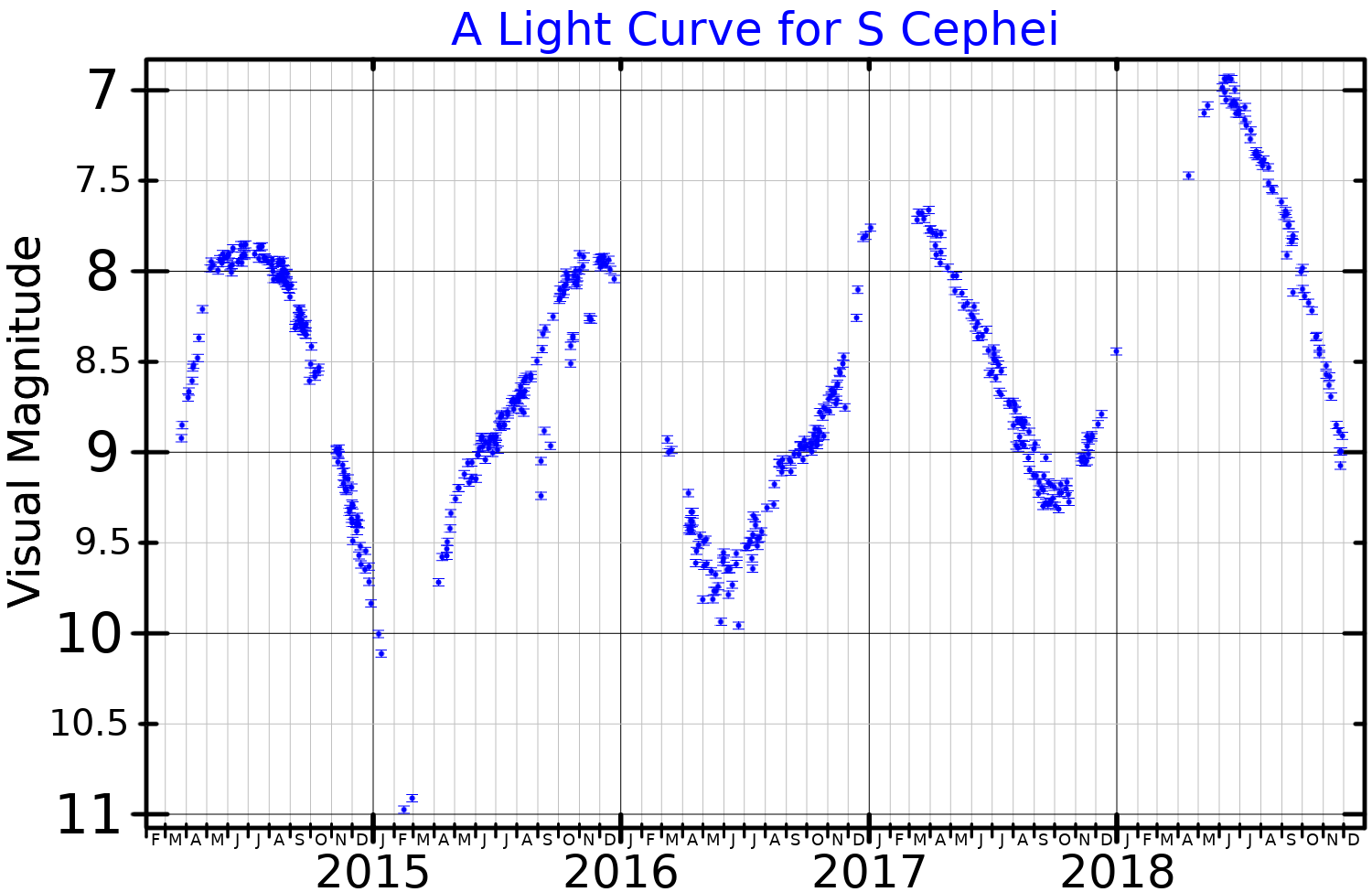
A visual band light curve for S Cephei, plotted from ASAS-SN data

S Cephei is a carbon star of spectral type C7.3e. It is also a Mira-type variable star whose apparent magnitude varies from 6.6 to 12.5 in the form of a pulsation over a period of 484 days. Its variability was discovered by Karl Hencke in 1858.

== See also ==
- Mu Cephei
- ST Cephei
