= Messier 25 =

Open cluster in Sagittarius

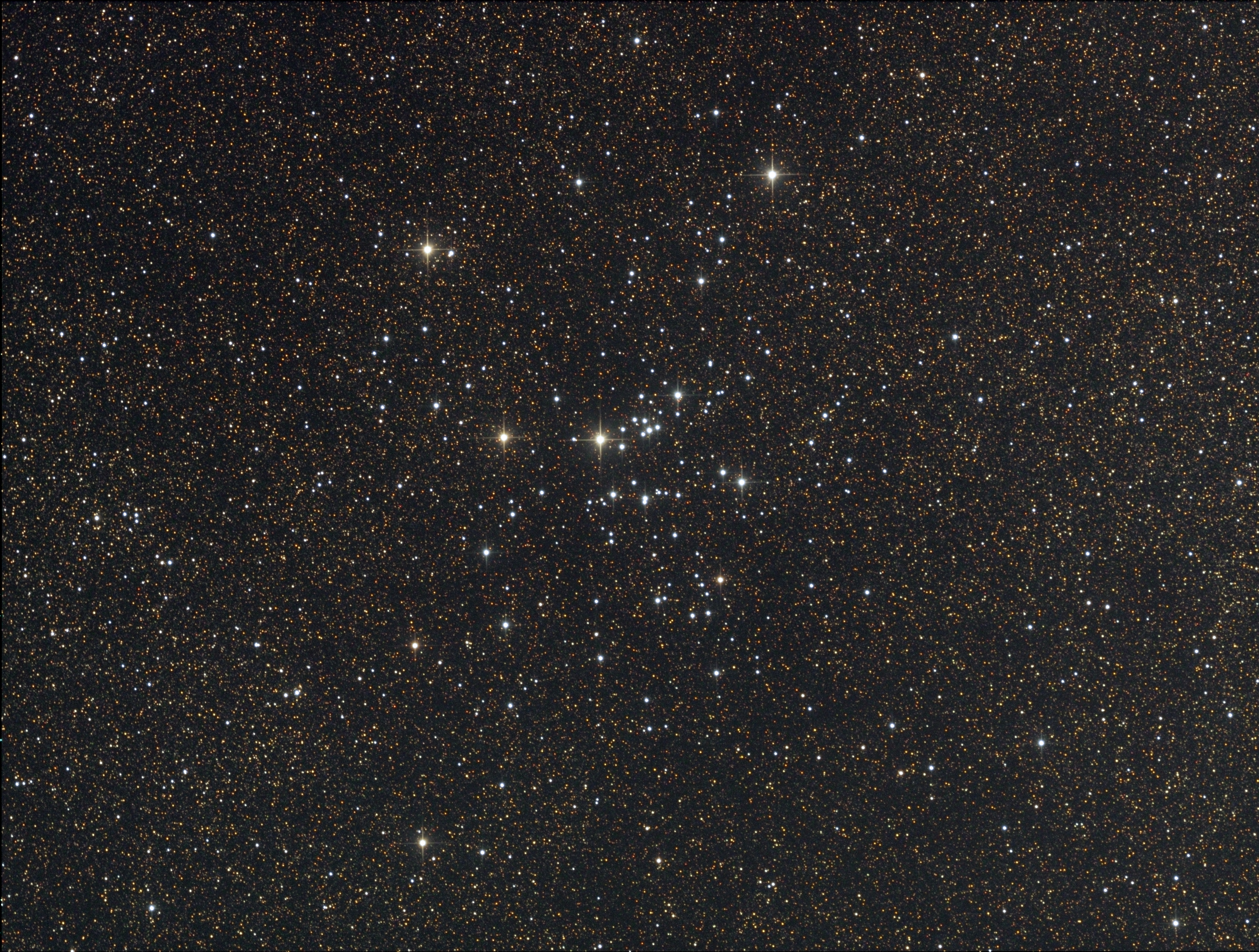
- Open cluster Messier 25 in Sagittarius

Observation data (J2000.0 epoch)
- Right ascension: 18^{h} 31^{m} 47.0^{s}
- Declination: −19° 07′ 00″
- Distance: 2,000 ly (620 pc)
- Apparent magnitude (V): 4.6
- Apparent dimensions (V): 36′

Physical characteristics
- Mass: 1,937 M_{☉} M_{☉}
- Radius: 6.5 light-years
- Estimated age: 67.6 million years
- Other designations: Messier 25, IC 4725, Cr 382, C 1828–192, Mel 204

Associations

Messier 25, also known as IC 4725, is an open cluster of stars in the southern constellation of Sagittarius. The first recorded observation of this cluster was made by Philippe Loys de Chéseaux in 1745 and it was included in Charles Messier's list of nebulous objects in 1764. The cluster is located near some obscuring features, with a dark lane passing near the center.

M25 is at a distance of about 2,000 light-years away from Earth and is 67.6 million years old. The spatial dimension of this cluster is about 13 light-years across. It has an estimated mass of 1,937 M_{☉}, of which about 24% is interstellar matter. A Delta Cephei type variable star designated U Sagittarii is a member of this cluster, as are two red giants, one of which is a binary system.

New research indicates M25 may constitute a ternary star cluster together with NGC 6716 and Collinder 394.

== See also ==
- List of Messier objects
