= CH Cygni =

Variable star in the Cygnus constellation

- Location of CH Cygni (circled)

Observation data Epoch J2000 Equinox ICRS
- Constellation: Cygnus
- Right ascension: 19^{h} 24^{m} 33.06773^{s}
- Declination: +50° 14′ 29.1263″
- Apparent magnitude (V): 5.60 – 8.49

Characteristics
- Spectral type: M7IIIab + Be
- Variable type: Z And and SR

Astrometry
Radial velocity (R_{v})	−59.74 km/s
Proper motion (μ)	RA: −7.09 mas/yr Dec.: −59.74 mas/yr
Parallax (π)	5.4642±0.2172 mas
Distance	600 ± 20 ly (183 ± 7 pc)

Orbit
Period (P)	15.58±0.13 yr
Semi-major axis (a)	8.5 AU
Eccentricity (e)	0.122±0.024
Inclination (i)	84°
Semi-amplitude (K_{1}) (primary)	4.45±0.12 km/s

Details

Red giant
Mass	2 M_{☉}
Radius	280 R_{☉}
Luminosity	5012 L_{☉}
Temperature	3,100 K

White dwarf
Mass	0.7 M_{☉}
Luminosity	0.25 L_{☉}

Other designations
- HD 182917, BD+49°2999, HIP 95413, SAO 31632

Database references
SIMBAD	data

CH Cygni (CH Cyg / HIP 95413 / BD +49 2999) is a red giant, variable, symbiotic binary in the constellation Cygnus.

== Properties ==
CH Cygni has a mass of 2 M_{☉} and a radius of 280 R_{☉}. Its white-dwarf companion has a mass of 0.75 M_{☉}, and the orbital period of the two stars is 5689 days. CH Cygni is classified as M7IIIab + Be.

== Observation history ==
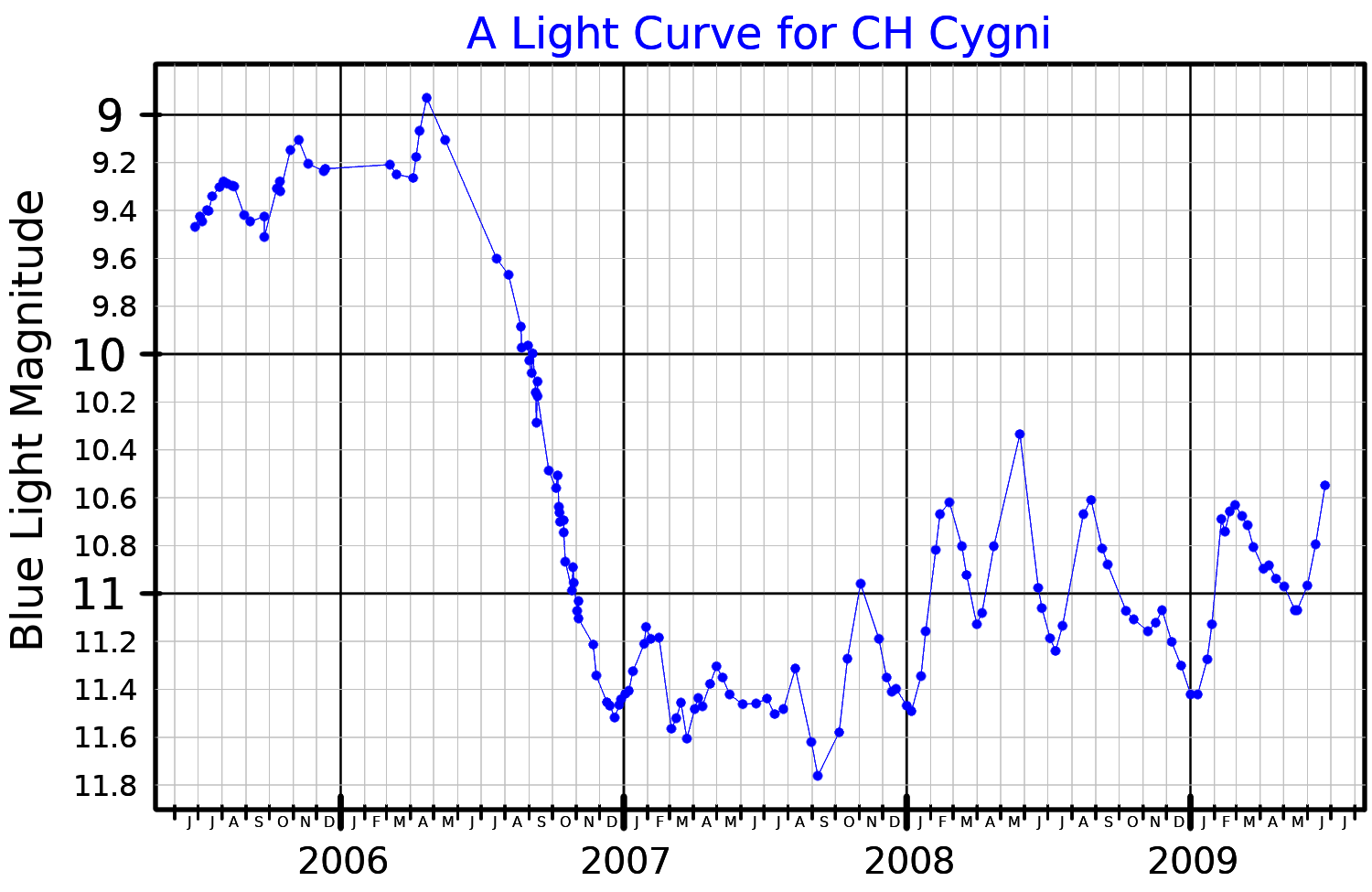
A blue band light curve for CH Cygni, adapted from Wallerstein et al. (2010)

The earliest observations of CH Cygni were made in 1890 by Pickering and Wendel using wedge photometer, and was classified as a M6III variable star in 1924. In 1963 strong H I emissions were observed, indicating CH Cygni was likely in a symbiotic relationship with a white dwarf. Similar emissions were observed in 1965, 1967, 1977, 1992, and 1998. The system was briefly thought to contain a third star but this was later disproved.

In 1984 bipolar jets were detected coming from CH Cygni, which were suspected to be due to accretion from its companion star. The luminosity of the system decreased significantly in 1986, likely owing to dust thrown out of the system by the jets or a concurrent helium flash. This dust had dissipated by 2002, with subsequent luminosities returning to pre-1985 levels.
