= X Herculis =

Variable star in the constellation Hercules

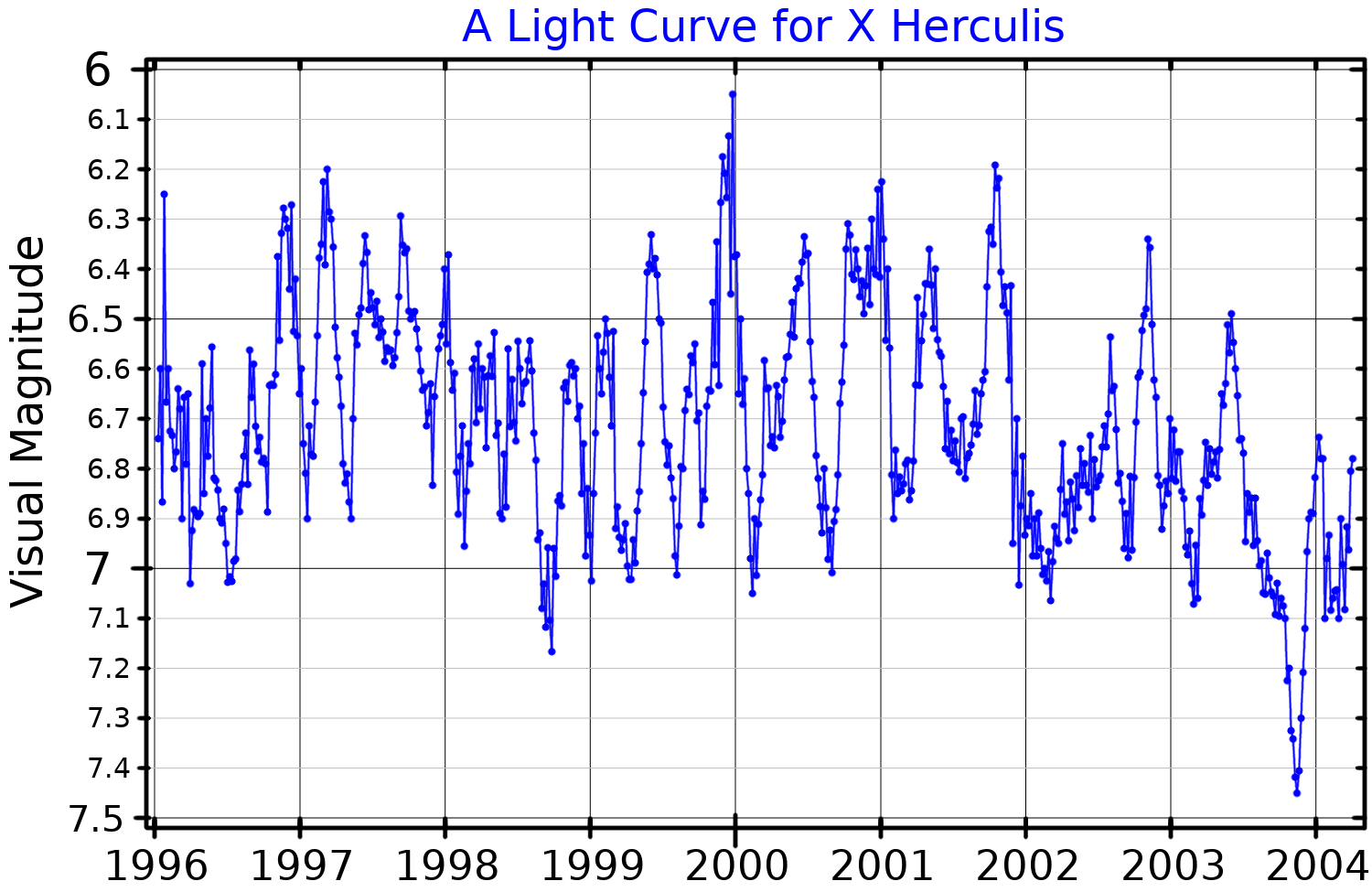
- A visual band light curve for X Herculis, plotted from AAVSO data. The individual measurements were averaged into five day wide bins, to improve signal/noise.

Observation data Epoch J2000 Equinox ICRS
- Constellation: Hercules
- Right ascension: 16^{h} 02^{m} 39.17301^{s}
- Declination: +47° 14′ 25.2653″
- Apparent magnitude (V): 5.8 - 7.0

Characteristics
- Evolutionary stage: AGB
- Spectral type: M8III
- Variable type: SRb

Astrometry
Radial velocity (R_{v})	−88.95±0.4 km/s
Proper motion (μ)	RA: −68.631±0.260 mas/yr Dec.: 62.824±0.385 mas/yr
Parallax (π)	8.1621±0.2511 mas
Distance	400 ± 10 ly (123 ± 4 pc)

Details
Mass	1.9 M_{☉}
Radius	183±4 R_{☉}
Luminosity	3570 L_{☉}
Temperature	3281±130 K

Other designations
- HD 144205, HIP 78574, SAO 45863, IRC +50248, RAFGL 5317

Database references
SIMBAD	data

X Herculis is a star about 400 light years from the Earth in the constellation Hercules. It is a semiregular variable star, ranging in brightness from magnitude 5.8 to 7.0 over a period of about 102 days. It is rarely visible to the naked-eye, but can be seen easily with a small telescope, or binoculars.

X Herculis was discovered to be a variable star by John Gore, in 1890. Variability was quickly confirmed by two other observers. Although it was known by a variety of names at the time of the discovery of its variability, the star was immediately given the variable star designation X Herculis. Subsequent studies found periods of 102±5, 178.5±5 and 658.3±17 days in the light curve.

X Herculis is an oxygen-rich AGB star, losing mass at a rate of 1.4×10^{−7} solar masses per year via a stellar wind. In 1986 Benjamin Zuckerman et al. detected the J=2→1 line of carbon monoxide (CO) in the stellar wind. The shape of the CO line profile shows that the wind has two components, one of which leaves the vicinity of the star at a speed of 3.2±0.5 km/sec, and another which has a speed of 9.0±1.0 km/sec. The slow wind appears to arise from a disk surrounding, and possibly orbiting X Herculis. The faster wind appears to arise from a bipolar outflow. The stellar winds have produced a large circumstellar shell. Studies of such a shell using molecular spectroscopy can only probe the inner region of the shell, because as the stellar wind expands and becomes less dense, the molecules in the gas are dissociated by the interstellar radiation field. Luckily, the high galactic latitude (48°) of X Herculis allows the 21 cm line of atomic hydrogen (HI) to be observed without contamination from unrelated material in the galactic plane. Lynn Matthews et al. mapped the HI shell, and found it to be at least 0.8 light years across, with a comet-like tail produced by the motion of the star through the interstellar medium (ISM). The mass of HI in the shell is about 2.1×10^{−3} solar masses, but the total mass of the shell may be significantly larger, because much of the hydrogen may be in molecular form.

Near-infrared radiation from X Herculis was detected in the first Two-Micron Sky Survey, published in 1969. The stellar winds from AGB stars contain dust and that dust was detected in the far-infrared by the IRAS satellite. The dust emission was resolved by IRAS, showing the same large shell that is seen in HI observations. X Herculis is moving through the ISM at a speed of 108 km/sec. Herschel Space Observatory images show a bow shock in the region where the stellar wind collides with the ISM, but they show no evidence of the bipolar flow seen in high resolution maps of the molecular line emission.
