= R Pictoris =

Variable star in the constellation Pictor

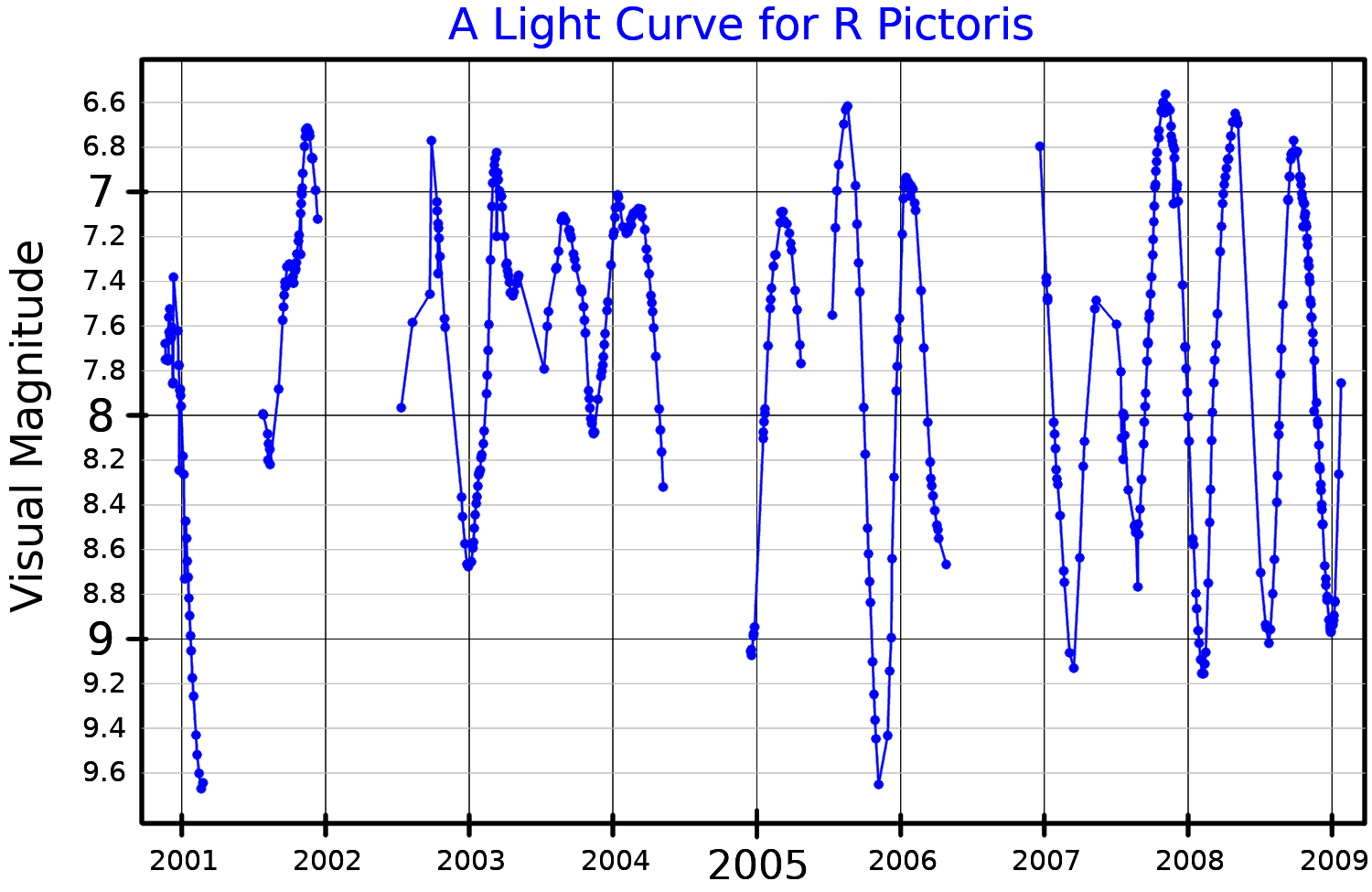
- A visual band light curve for R Pictoris, plotted from TESS data

Observation data Epoch J2000 Equinox ICRS
- Constellation: Pictor
- Right ascension: 04^{h} 46^{m} 09.54631^{s}
- Declination: −49° 14′ 45.0615″
- Apparent magnitude (V): 6.35 to 10.10

Characteristics
- Evolutionary stage: AGB
- Spectral type: M1IIe-M4IIe
- Variable type: Semiregular

Astrometry
Proper motion (μ)	RA: +36.289 mas/yr Dec.: +37.561 mas/yr
Parallax (π)	0.9613±0.0233 mas
Distance	3,390 ± 80 ly (1,040 ± 30 pc)

Details
Mass	2.4 M_{☉}
Radius	177 R_{☉}
Luminosity	4,296 L_{☉}
Surface gravity (log g)	1.25 cgs
Temperature	3,353 K
Metallicity [Fe/H]	−0.45 dex

Other designations
- CD−49°1439, HD 30551, HIP 22170, SAO 216987

Database references
SIMBAD	data

R Pictoris is a semiregular variable type star in the constellation Pictor. It ranges between apparent magnitude 5.1 and 14.4, and spectral types M1IIe to M4IIe, over a period of 168 days. It should be faintly visible to the naked eye of an observer with excellent observing conditions, when it is near its maximum brightness.

In 1895, Williamina Fleming discovered that the star is a variable star. In 1907 it appeared with its variable star designation, R Pictoris, in Annie Jump Cannon's Second Catalog of Variable Stars.
