= X Cygni =

Variable star in the constellation Cygnus

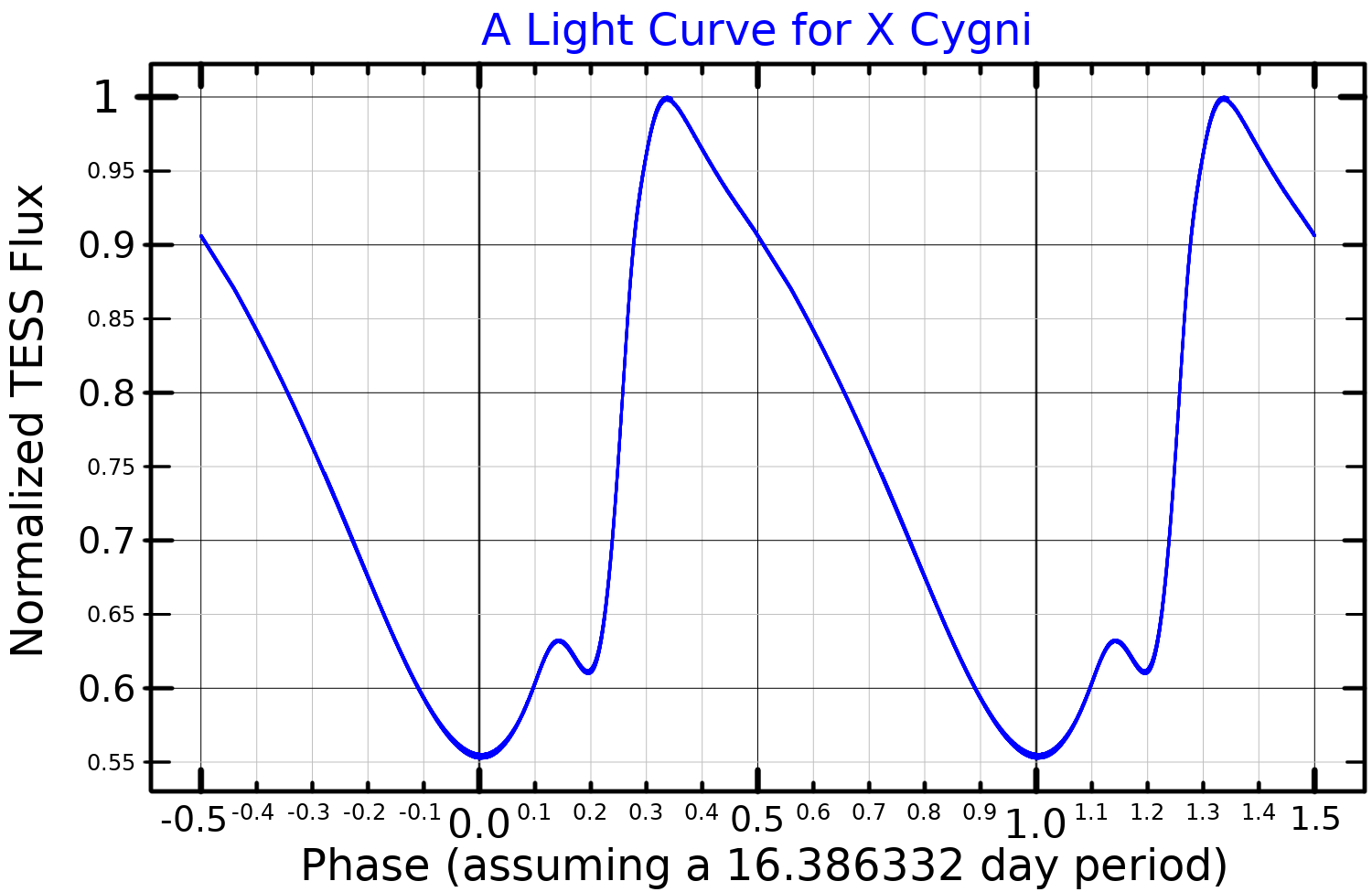
- A light curve for X Cygni, plotted from TESS data

Observation data Epoch J2000 Equinox ICRS
- Constellation: Cygnus
- Right ascension: 20^{h} 43^{m} 24.192^{s}
- Declination: +35° 35′ 16.08″
- Apparent magnitude (V): 5.85 to 6.91

Characteristics
- Spectral type: F7 Ib to G8 Ib
- Variable type: δ Cep

Astrometry
Radial velocity (R_{v})	8.1±0.2 km/s
Proper motion (μ)	RA: −6.673 mas/yr Dec.: −5.108 mas/yr
Parallax (π)	0.8842±0.0199 mas
Distance	3,690 ± 80 ly (1,130 ± 30 pc)
Absolute magnitude (M_{V})	−4.53

Details
Mass	7.9–8.9 M_{☉}
Radius	95.9±1.6 R_{☉}
Luminosity	5,202 L_{☉}
Surface gravity (log g)	1.601 cgs
Temperature	5,315±80 K
Metallicity [Fe/H]	0.10±0.08 dex
Rotational velocity (v sin i)	8 km/s
Age	31 Myr

Other designations
- X Cyg, BD+35°4234, GC 28886, HD 197572, HIP 102276, HR 7932, SAO 70423

Database references
SIMBAD	data

X Cygni is a variable star in the northern constellation of Cygnus, abbreviated X Cyg. This is a Delta Cephei variable that ranges in brightness from an apparent visual magnitude of 5.85 down to 6.91 with a period of 16.386332 days. At it brightest, this star is dimly visible to the naked eye. The distance to this star is approximately 3,690 light years based on parallax measurements. It is drifting further away with a radial velocity of 8.1 km/s. This star is a likely member of the open cluster Ruprecht 173.

The variable luminosity of this star was discovered by S. C. Chandler, Jr. in 1886. In 1907, E. B. Frost showed that X Cyg is an F-type star with a varying radial velocity, behaving analogous to a Delta Cephei variable. M. Luizet in 1912 found a cyclical pulsation period of 16.38543 days for the variation. In 1919, F. C. Jordan determined that the color index of the star changed over the course of each cycle, becoming redder as the star grew fainter. It came to be identified as a member of the benchmark class of stars termed Classical Cepheid variables that satisfy a simple period–luminosity relation.

In 1954, R. P. Kraft found a stellar classification of F7 Ib at peak brightness, matching the spectrum of an F-type supergiant star. The class of the star varies over the course of a pulsation cycle, ranging down to G8 Ib at minimum brightness. R. P. Kraft in 1956 identified a doubling of certain spectral lines, which he explained as the result of a falling shell of matter from a prior pulsation cycle that is colliding with the photosphere. Unlike most cepheid variables that undergo a single shock per cycle, X Cyg has been found to undergo a double shock.

No orbiting companion has been identified with a period of ten years or less. The star shows cirrus with tentative evidence for extended emission of infrared.
