= W Orionis =

Star in the constellation Orion

- Location of W Orionis (circled in red)

Observation data Epoch J2000 Equinox ICRS
- Constellation: Orion
- Right ascension: 05^{h} 05^{m} 23.72142^{s}
- Declination: +01° 10′ 39.4512″
- Apparent magnitude (V): 4.4 - 6.9

Characteristics
- Evolutionary stage: AGB
- Spectral type: C-N5 C_{2}5.5 (C5,4(N5))
- U−B color index: +6.84
- B−V color index: +3.42
- Variable type: SRb

Astrometry
Radial velocity (R_{v})	+16.50 km/s
Proper motion (μ)	RA: +7.5 mas/yr Dec.: -1.4 mas/yr
Parallax (π)	2.65±0.95 mas
Distance	approx. 1,200 ly (approx. 400 pc)
Absolute magnitude (M_{V})	−5.76

Details
Mass	1-2 M_{☉}
Radius	406 R_{☉}
Luminosity	6,761 L_{☉}
Surface gravity (log g)	−0.60 cgs
Temperature	2,600 K
Metallicity [Fe/H]	0.0 dex

Other designations
- W Ori, BD+00°939, HD 32736, HIP 23680

Database references
SIMBAD	data

W Orionis is a carbon star in the constellation Orion, approximately 400 parsecs (1,300 ly) away. It varies regularly in brightness between extremes of magnitude 4.4 and 6.9 roughly every 7 months. When it is near its maximum brightness, it is faintly visible to the naked eye of an observer with good observing conditions.

== Variability ==
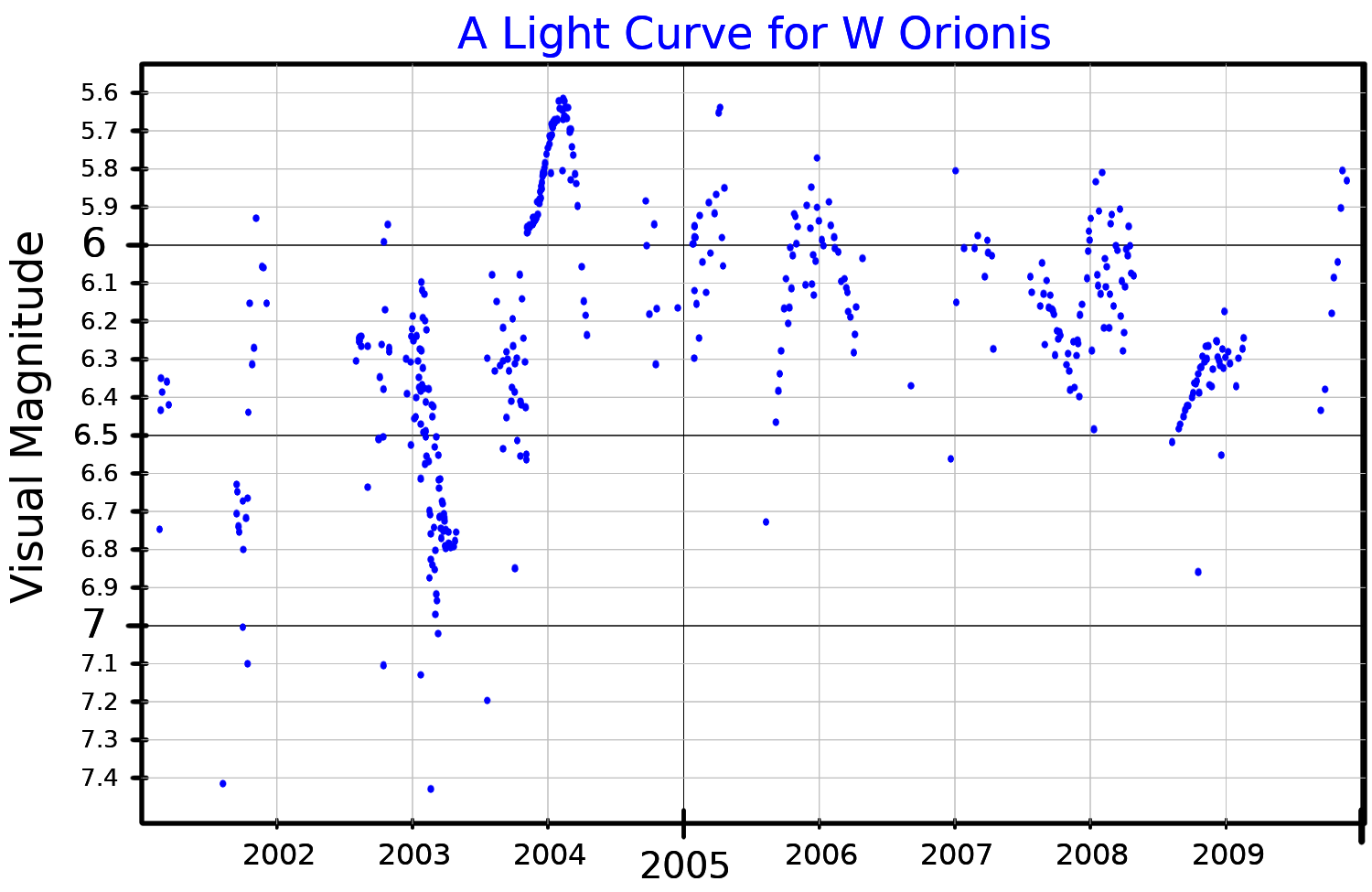
The visual band light curve for W Orionis, plotted from ASAS data

Evelyn Leland discovered that the star is a variable star based on observations done in the last decades of the 19th century, when it was known as BD +00°939. The discovery was announced in 1895. It was listed with its variable star designation, W Orionis, in Annie Jump Cannon's 1907 work Second Catalog of Variable Stars. W Orionis is a semiregular variable with an approximately 212‑day cycle. A long secondary period of 2,450 days has also been reported.

== Properties ==
The angular diameter of W Orionis has been measured using interferometry and a value of 9.7 mas is found. Although it is known to be a pulsating variable star, no changes in the diameter were seen.

Technetium has not been detected in W Orionis, an unexpected result since this s-process element should be dredged up in all thermally-pulsating AGB stars and especially in carbon stars.
