= T Ceti =

Variable star in the constellation Cetus

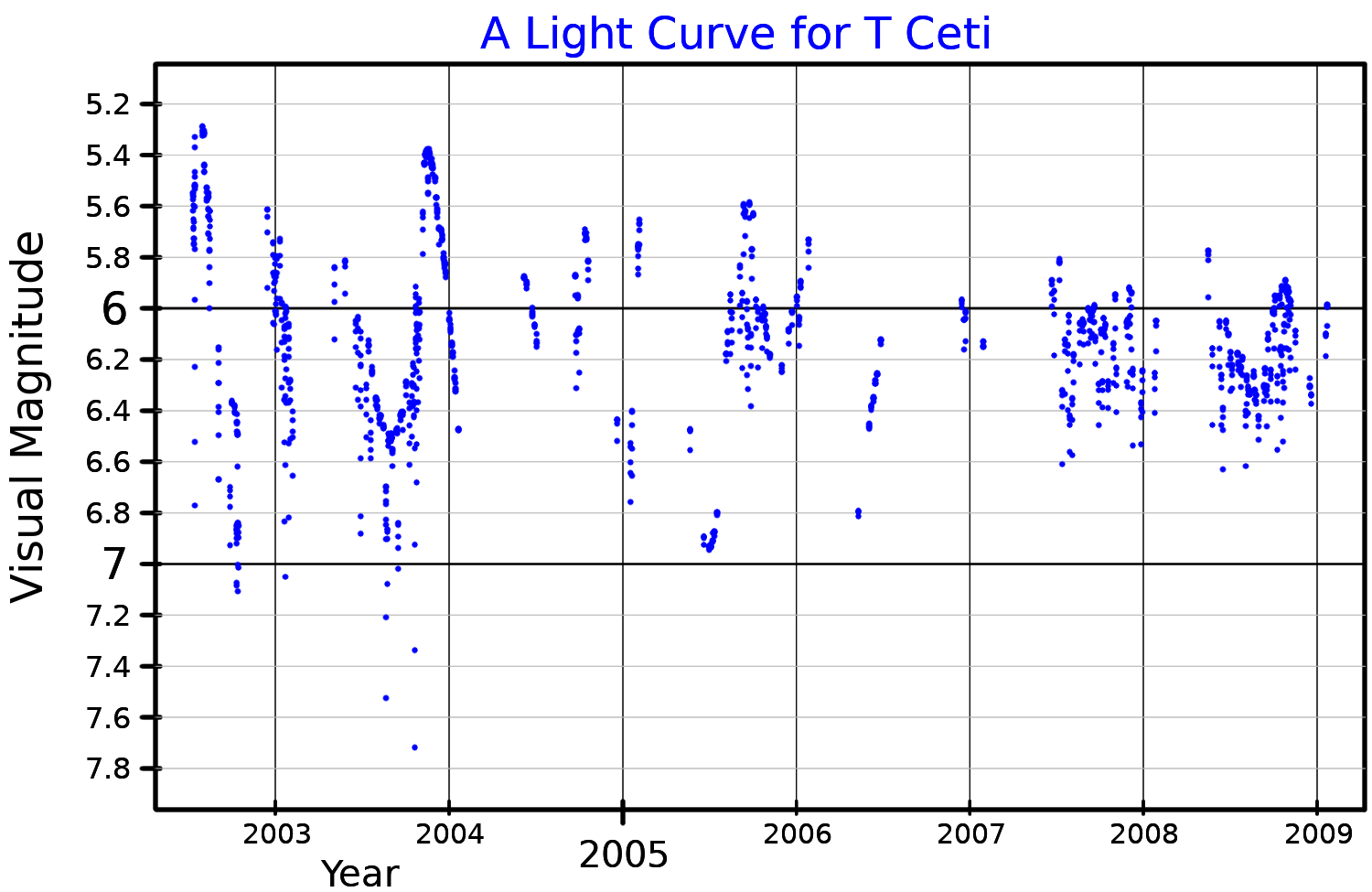
- A light curve for T Ceti, ploted from ASAS data

Observation data Epoch J2000 Equinox ICRS
- Constellation: Cetus
- Right ascension: 00^{h} 21^{m} 46.27529^{s}
- Declination: −20° 03′ 28.9098″
- Apparent magnitude (V): 5.0 - 6.9

Characteristics
- Evolutionary stage: AGB
- Spectral type: M5-6Se
- B−V color index: 1.58±0.03
- Variable type: SRc

Astrometry
| Radial velocity (R_{v}) | +28.9±0.9 km/s |
| Proper motion (μ) | RA: +59.665 mas/yr Dec.: −10.229 mas/yr |
| Parallax (π) | 3.70±0.47 mas |
| Distance | approx. 900 ly (approx. 270 pc) |
| Absolute magnitude (M_{V}) | −1.51 |

Details
| Mass | 3.0±0.3 M_{☉} |
| Radius | 275±34 R_{☉} |
| Luminosity | 8,128+2,587 −1,962 L_{☉} |
| Surface gravity (log g) | 0.01±0.11 cgs |
| Temperature | 3,396+103 −100 K |
| Metallicity [Fe/H] | 0.0 dex |

Other designations
- T Cet, BD−20°50, HD 1760, HIP 1728, HR 85, SAO 166210

Database references
| SIMBAD | data |

T Ceti is a semiregular variable star located in the equatorial constellation of Cetus. It varies between magnitudes 5.0 and 6.9 over 159.3 days, making it faintly visible to the naked eye except when near minimum brightness. The stellar parallax shift measured by Hipparcos is 3.7 mas, which yields a distance estimate of roughly 900 light years. It is moving further from the Earth with a heliocentric radial velocity of +29 km/s.

Seth Carlo Chandler discovered that the star is a variable star, during the northern hemisphere winter of 1881-1882. It was listed with its variable star designation, T Ceti, in Annie Jump Cannon's 1907 work Second Catalog of Variable Stars.

This is an MS-type star on the asymptotic giant branch with a spectral type of M5-6Se. (The 'e' notation indicates the presence of emission lines in the spectrum). The star is losing mass at the rate of 8.2×10^{−8} M_{☉} y^{−1}, and it is surrounded by a circumstellar dust shell consisting of crystallized, mostly iron-rich silicates.

T Ceti has an estimated three times the mass of the Sun and has expanded to 275 times the Sun's radius. It is radiating 8,128 times the Sun's luminosity from its enlarged photosphere at an effective temperature of 3,396 K.
