= AR Cephei =

Variable star in the constellation Cepheus

- AR Cephei, as seen during the Digitized Sky Survey

Observation data Epoch J2000 Equinox ICRS
- Constellation: Cepheus
- Right ascension: 22^{h} 51^{m} 33.86137^{s}
- Declination: +85° 02′ 46.9418″
- Apparent magnitude (V): 6.9 - 8.3

Characteristics
- Spectral type: M4 III
- B−V color index: +1.52
- Variable type: SRb

Astrometry
Radial velocity (R_{v})	−15.66±0.23 km/s
Proper motion (μ)	RA: 26.580 mas/yr Dec.: 4.143 mas/yr
Parallax (π)	3.2317±0.0967 mas
Distance	1,010 ± 30 ly (309 ± 9 pc)

Details
Mass	2.8 M_{☉}
Radius	123 R_{☉}
Luminosity	2,094 L_{☉}
Surface gravity (log g)	1.49 cgs
Temperature	2,400 - 3,700 K
Metallicity [Fe/H]	−0.39 dex

Other designations
- BD+84 516, HD 217158, HIP 112882, SAO 3809

Database references
SIMBAD	data

AR Cephei (AR Cep) is a variable star in the constellation Cepheus. It is classified as a semiregular star with a spectral type of M4III.

Aernout de Sitter discovered the star in 1933. It was given its variable star designation, AR Cephei, in 1939.

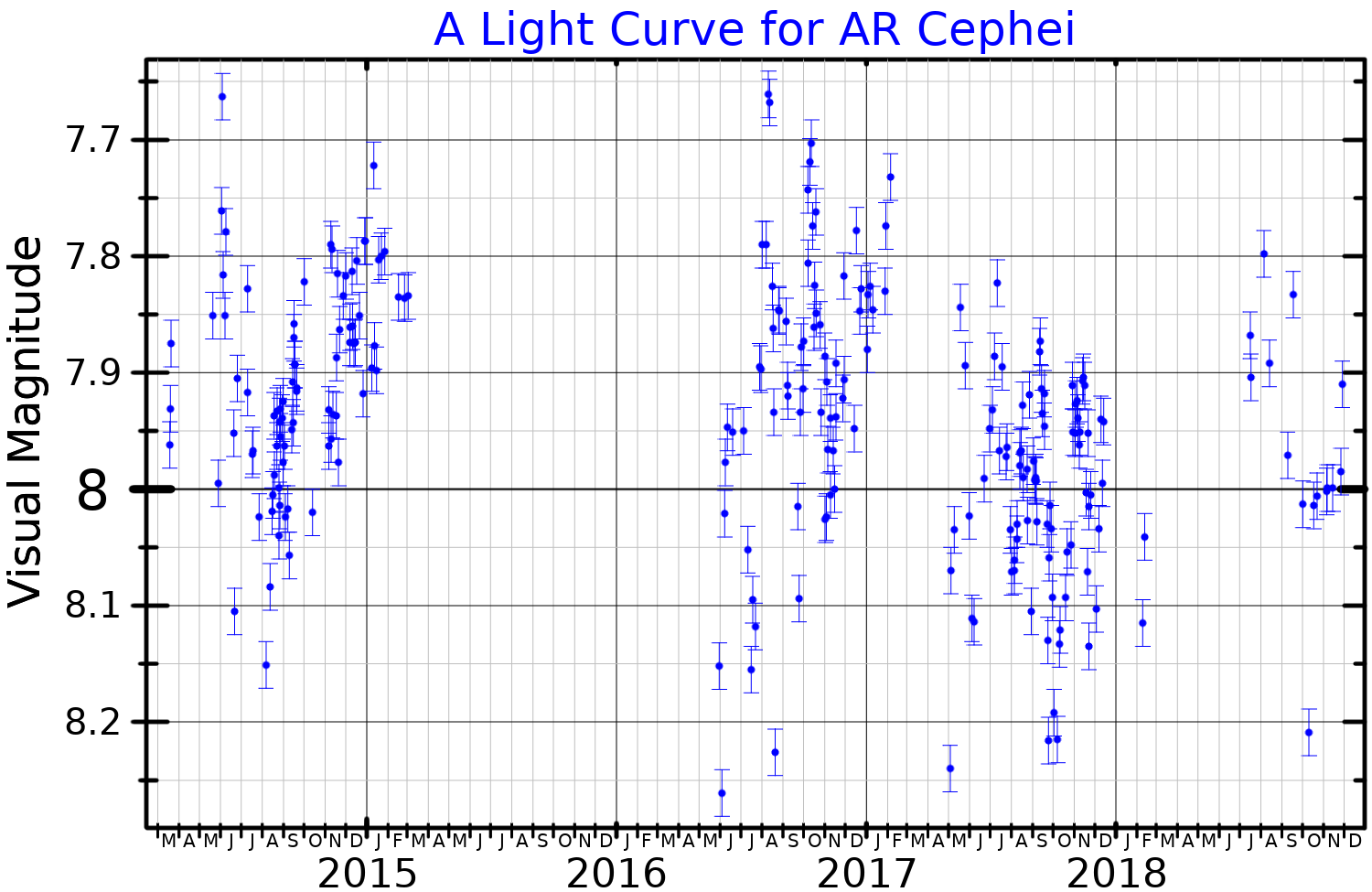
A visual band light curve for AR Cephei, plotted from ASAS-SN data

AR Cephei is located approximately 1,010 light-years (309 parsecs) from the Solar System, and has a radial velocity of -16 km/s, meaning that it is moving toward the Sun at ~16 kilometers every second.

== See also ==
- List of variable stars
- T Cephei
