= WZ Cassiopeiae =

Star in the constellation Cassiopeia

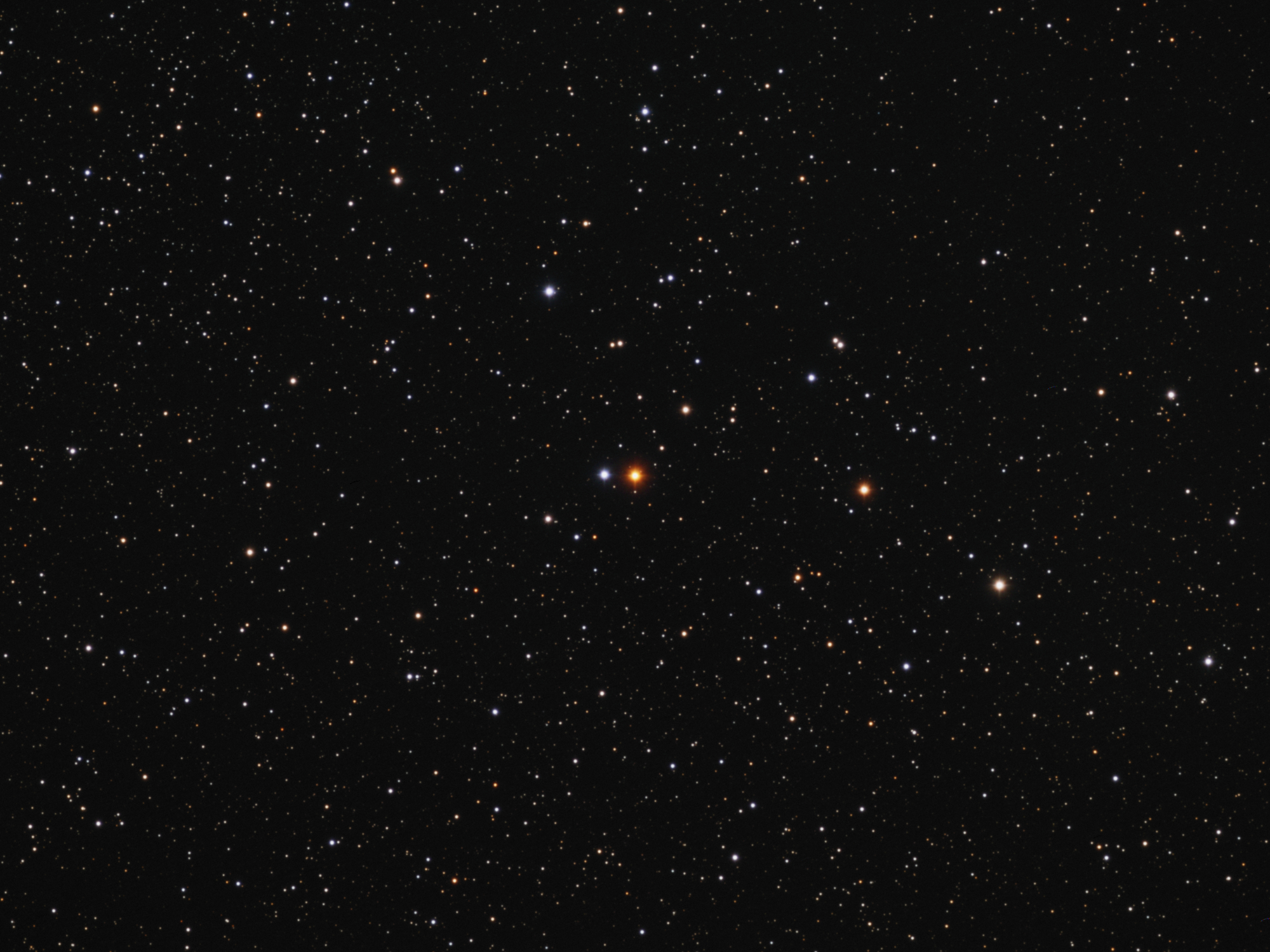
- WZ Cassiopeiae in optical light

Observation data Epoch J2000 Equinox ICRS
- Constellation: Cassiopeia
- Right ascension: 00^{h} 01^{m} 15.85680^{s}
- Declination: +60° 21′ 19.0259″
- Apparent magnitude (V): 6.3 – 8.8

Characteristics
- Evolutionary stage: AGB
- Spectral type: C-N7 III: C_{2} 2 Li 10
- U−B color index: +4.29
- B−V color index: +2.835±0.040
- Variable type: SRb

Astrometry
Radial velocity (R_{v})	−34.0±2 km/s
Proper motion (μ)	RA: +10.7693 mas/yr Dec.: −5.672 mas/yr
Parallax (π)	2.1227±0.0297 mas
Distance	1,540 ± 20 ly (471 ± 7 pc)

Details
Mass	5.2 M_{☉}
Radius	~600 R_{☉}
Luminosity	12,400 L_{☉}
Surface gravity (log g)	1.55 cgs
Temperature	3,095 K
Metallicity [Fe/H]	−0.19 dex

Other designations
- WZ Cas, BD+59°2810, HD 224855, HIP 99, SAO 21002

Database references
SIMBAD	data

WZ Cassiopeiae (WZ Cas) is a deep red hued star in the northern constellation of Cassiopeia. It is a variable star with a magnitude that ranges from 6.3 down to 8.8, placing it near the limit of naked eye visibility at peak magnitude. The estimated distance to this star, as determined from its annual parallax shift of 2.1 mas, is about 1,540 light years. It is moving closer to the Earth with a heliocentric radial velocity of −34 km/s.

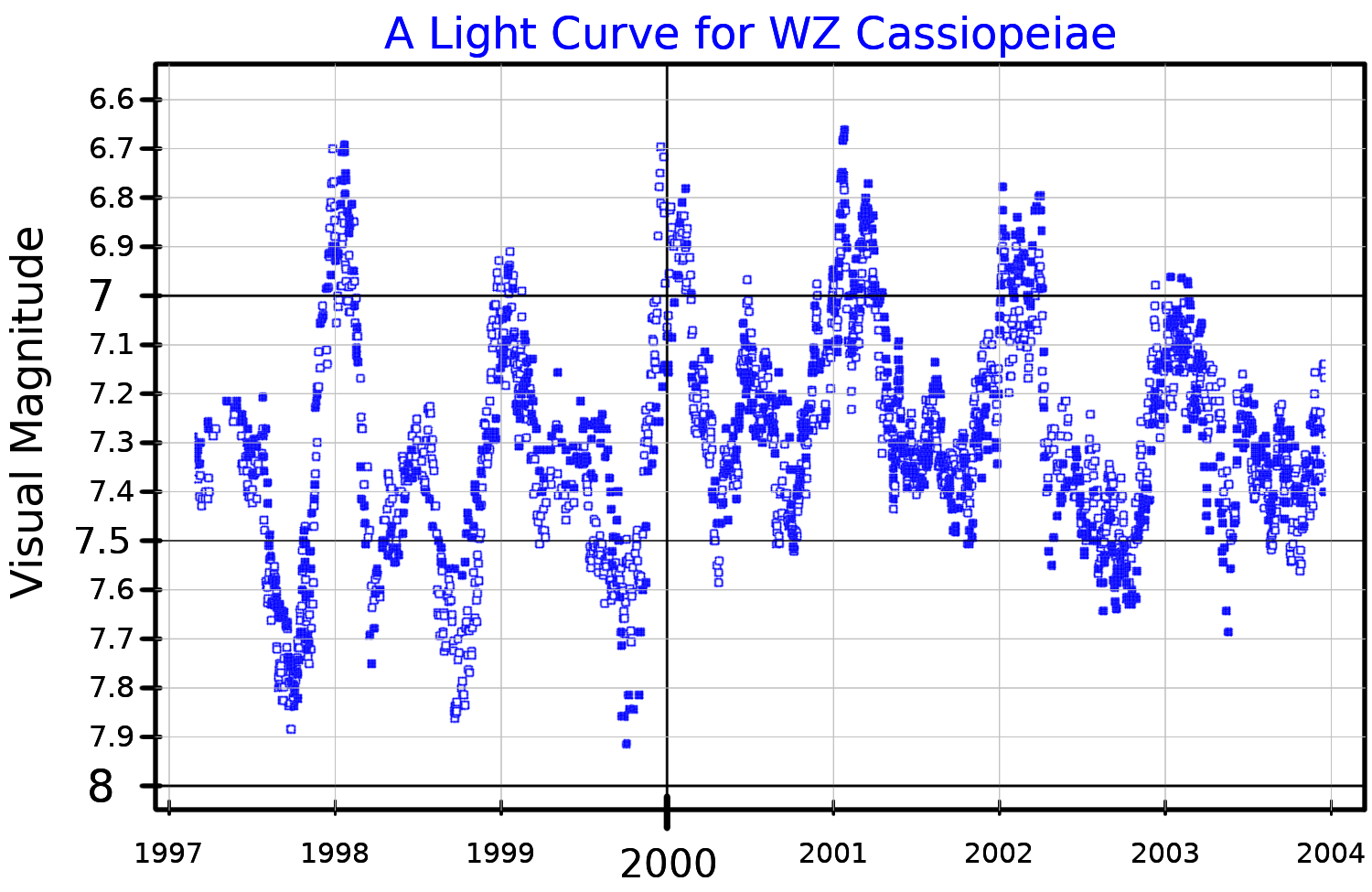
A visual band light curve for WZ Cassiopeiae, adapted from Lebzelter et al. (2005)

João de Moraes Pereira discovered that the star's brightness varies, in 1893. It was given its variable star designation in 1921. This is a semiregular variable of subtype SRb with periods of 186 and 366 days due to radial pulsations.

This is an aging carbon star on the asymptotic giant branch. Keenan (1993) assigned it a classification of C-N7 III: C_{2} 2 Li 10, which indicates it is of the N star subtype in the revised Morgan–Keenan system, with a C_{2} strength index of 2 (a measure of the excess of carbon over oxygen) and an anomalously strong line of lithium at 6707 Å. It is losing mass at the rate of 6.5×10^{−9} M_{☉} yr^{−1}, which is on the low side for a star of this type. It has expanded to around 600 times the Sun's radius and is radiating 12,400 times the Sun's luminosity from its photosphere at a relatively cool effective temperature of 3,095 K.

A magnitude 8.4 B-type visual companion, designated HD 224869, is located at an angular separation of 58″. The difference in the radial velocities for the two stars – 20 km/s – is too large for them to be dynamically associated.
