= Gemini in Chinese astronomy =

The modern constellation Gemini lies across two of the quadrants, symbolized by the White Tiger of the West (西方白虎, Xī Fāng Bái Hǔ) and the Vermilion Bird of the South (南方朱雀, Nán Fāng Zhū Què), that divide the sky in traditional Chinese uranography.

The name of the western constellation in modern Chinese is 雙子座 (shuāng zǐ zuò), meaning "the twin constellation".

== Stars ==
The map of Chinese constellation in constellation Gemini area consists of :

Four Symbols	Mansion (Chinese name)	Romanization	Translation	Asterisms (Chinese name)	Romanization	Translation	Western star name	Proper Name	Chinese star name	Romanization	Translation
White Tiger of the West (西方白虎)	觜	Zī	Turtle Beak	司怪	Sīguài	Deity in Charge of Monsters					
White Tiger of the West (西方白虎)	觜	Zī	Turtle Beak	司怪	Sīguài	Deity in Charge of Monsters	1 Gem		司怪二	Sīguàièr	2nd star
White Tiger of the West (西方白虎)	觜	Zī	Turtle Beak	司怪	Sīguài	Deity in Charge of Monsters	HD 40724		司怪增二	Sīguàizēngèr	2nd additional star
Vermilion Bird of the South (南方朱雀)	井	Jǐng	Well	井	Jǐng	Well					
Vermilion Bird of the South (南方朱雀)	井	Jǐng	Well	井	Jǐng	Well	μ Gem	Tejat			
Vermilion Bird of the South (南方朱雀)	井	Jǐng	Well	井	Jǐng	Well	μ Gem	Tejat	井宿一	Jǐngsùyī	1st star
Vermilion Bird of the South (南方朱雀)	井	Jǐng	Well	井	Jǐng	Well	μ Gem	Tejat	井宿距星	Jǐngsujùxīng	Separated star
Vermilion Bird of the South (南方朱雀)	井	Jǐng	Well	井	Jǐng	Well	μ Gem	Tejat	井宿西扇第一星	Jǐngsuxīshāndìyīxīng	1st star in western area
Vermilion Bird of the South (南方朱雀)	井	Jǐng	Well	井	Jǐng	Well	μ Gem	Tejat	天苑东北星	Tiānyuàndōngběixīng	Star in the northwest of Celestial Meadows constellation
Vermilion Bird of the South (南方朱雀)	井	Jǐng	Well	井	Jǐng	Well	ν Gem				
Vermilion Bird of the South (南方朱雀)	井	Jǐng	Well	井	Jǐng	Well	ν Gem		井宿二	Jǐngsùèr	2nd star
Vermilion Bird of the South (南方朱雀)	井	Jǐng	Well	井	Jǐng	Well	ν Gem		井宿西扇第二星	Jǐngsuxīshāndìèrxīng	2nd star in western area
Vermilion Bird of the South (南方朱雀)	井	Jǐng	Well	井	Jǐng	Well	γ Gem	Alhena			
Vermilion Bird of the South (南方朱雀)	井	Jǐng	Well	井	Jǐng	Well	γ Gem	Alhena	井宿三	Jǐngsusān	3rd star
Vermilion Bird of the South (南方朱雀)	井	Jǐng	Well	井	Jǐng	Well	γ Gem	Alhena	井宿西扇第三星	Jǐngsuxīshāndìsānxīng	3rd star in western area
Vermilion Bird of the South (南方朱雀)	井	Jǐng	Well	井	Jǐng	Well	ξ Gem	Alzirr	井宿四	Jǐngsusì	4th star
Vermilion Bird of the South (南方朱雀)	井	Jǐng	Well	井	Jǐng	Well	ε Gem	Mebsuta			
Vermilion Bird of the South (南方朱雀)	井	Jǐng	Well	井	Jǐng	Well	ε Gem	Mebsuta	井宿五	Jǐngsuwǔ	5th star
Vermilion Bird of the South (南方朱雀)	井	Jǐng	Well	井	Jǐng	Well	ε Gem	Mebsuta	井宿东扇第一星	Jǐngsudōngshāndìyīxīng	1st star in eastern area
Vermilion Bird of the South (南方朱雀)	井	Jǐng	Well	井	Jǐng	Well	36 Gem				
Vermilion Bird of the South (南方朱雀)	井	Jǐng	Well	井	Jǐng	Well	36 Gem		井宿六	Jǐngsuliù	6th star
Vermilion Bird of the South (南方朱雀)	井	Jǐng	Well	井	Jǐng	Well	36 Gem		井宿东扇第二星	Jǐngsudōngshāndìèrxīng	2nd star in eastern area
Vermilion Bird of the South (南方朱雀)	井	Jǐng	Well	井	Jǐng	Well	ζ Gem	Mekbuda (for component Aa)			
Vermilion Bird of the South (南方朱雀)	井	Jǐng	Well	井	Jǐng	Well	ζ Gem	Mekbuda (for component Aa)	井宿七	Jǐngsuqī	7th star
Vermilion Bird of the South (南方朱雀)	井	Jǐng	Well	井	Jǐng	Well	ζ Gem	Mekbuda (for component Aa)	井宿东扇第三星	Jǐngsudōngshāndìsānxīng	3rd star in eastern area
Vermilion Bird of the South (南方朱雀)	井	Jǐng	Well	井	Jǐng	Well	λ Gem				
Vermilion Bird of the South (南方朱雀)	井	Jǐng	Well	井	Jǐng	Well	λ Gem		井宿八	Jǐngsubā	8th star
Vermilion Bird of the South (南方朱雀)	井	Jǐng	Well	井	Jǐng	Well	λ Gem		井宿东扇第四星	Jǐngsudōngshāndìsìxīng	4th star in eastern area
Vermilion Bird of the South (南方朱雀)	井	Jǐng	Well	井	Jǐng	Well	28 Gem		井宿增四	Jǐngsuzēngsì	4th additional star
Vermilion Bird of the South (南方朱雀)	井	Jǐng	Well	井	Jǐng	Well	26 Gem		井宿增七	Jǐngsuzēngqī	7th additional star
Vermilion Bird of the South (南方朱雀)	井	Jǐng	Well	井	Jǐng	Well	23 Gem		井宿增八	Jǐngsuzēngbā	8th additional star
Vermilion Bird of the South (南方朱雀)	井	Jǐng	Well	井	Jǐng	Well	HD 46595		井宿增九	Jǐngsuzēngjiǔ	9th additional star
Vermilion Bird of the South (南方朱雀)	井	Jǐng	Well	井	Jǐng	Well	30 Gem		井宿增十	Jǐngsuzēngshí	10th additional star
Vermilion Bird of the South (南方朱雀)	井	Jǐng	Well	井	Jǐng	Well	32 Gem		井宿增十一	Jǐngsuzēngshíyī	11th additional star
Vermilion Bird of the South (南方朱雀)	井	Jǐng	Well	井	Jǐng	Well	35 Gem		井宿增十二	Jǐngsuzēngshíèr	12th additional star
Vermilion Bird of the South (南方朱雀)	井	Jǐng	Well	井	Jǐng	Well	38 Gem		井宿增十三	Jǐngsuzēngshísān	13th additional star
Vermilion Bird of the South (南方朱雀)	井	Jǐng	Well	井	Jǐng	Well	41 Gem		井宿增十四	Jǐngsuzēngshísì	14th additional star
Vermilion Bird of the South (南方朱雀)	井	Jǐng	Well	井	Jǐng	Well	45 Gem		井宿增十五	Jǐngsuzēngshíwǔ	15th additional star
Vermilion Bird of the South (南方朱雀)	井	Jǐng	Well	井	Jǐng	Well	HD 55283		井宿增十六	Jǐngsuzēngshíliù	16th additional star
Vermilion Bird of the South (南方朱雀)	井	Jǐng	Well	井	Jǐng	Well	51 Gem		井宿增十七	Jǐngsuzēngshíqī	17th additional star
Vermilion Bird of the South (南方朱雀)	井	Jǐng	Well	钺	Yuè	Battle Axe					
Vermilion Bird of the South (南方朱雀)	井	Jǐng	Well	钺	Yuè	Battle Axe	η Gem	Propus (for component Aa)			
Vermilion Bird of the South (南方朱雀)	井	Jǐng	Well	钺	Yuè	Battle Axe	η Gem	Propus (for component Aa)	钺	Yuè	(One star of)
Vermilion Bird of the South (南方朱雀)	井	Jǐng	Well	钺	Yuè	Battle Axe	η Gem	Propus (for component Aa)	杠南第一星	Gāngnándìyīxīng	1st star in the south of Canopy Support constellation
Vermilion Bird of the South (南方朱雀)	井	Jǐng	Well	钺	Yuè	Battle Axe	9 Gem		鉞增一	Yuèzēngyī	1st additional star
Vermilion Bird of the South (南方朱雀)	井	Jǐng	Well	北河	Běihé	North River					
Vermilion Bird of the South (南方朱雀)	井	Jǐng	Well	北河	Běihé	North River	ρ Gem		北河一	Běihéyī	1st star
Vermilion Bird of the South (南方朱雀)	井	Jǐng	Well	北河	Běihé	North River	α Gem	Castor			
Vermilion Bird of the South (南方朱雀)	井	Jǐng	Well	北河	Běihé	North River	α Gem	Castor	北河二	Běihéèr	2nd star
Vermilion Bird of the South (南方朱雀)	井	Jǐng	Well	北河	Běihé	North River	α Gem	Castor	北河中星	Běihézhōngxīng	Center star
Vermilion Bird of the South (南方朱雀)	井	Jǐng	Well	北河	Běihé	North River	β Gem	Pollux			
Vermilion Bird of the South (南方朱雀)	井	Jǐng	Well	北河	Běihé	North River	β Gem	Pollux	北河三	Běihésān	3rd star
Vermilion Bird of the South (南方朱雀)	井	Jǐng	Well	北河	Běihé	North River	β Gem	Pollux	北河东大星	Běihédōngdàxīng	Big eastern star
Vermilion Bird of the South (南方朱雀)	井	Jǐng	Well	北河	Běihé	North River	β Gem	Pollux	八谷西南星	Bāgǔxīnánxīng	Star in the southwest of Eight Kinds of Crops constellation
Vermilion Bird of the South (南方朱雀)	井	Jǐng	Well	北河	Běihé	North River	70 Gem		北河增一	Běihézēngyī	1st additional star
Vermilion Bird of the South (南方朱雀)	井	Jǐng	Well	北河	Běihé	North River	ο Gem	Jishui	北河增二	Běihézēngèr	2nd additional star
Vermilion Bird of the South (南方朱雀)	井	Jǐng	Well	北河	Běihé	North River	π Gem		北河增三	Běihézēngsān	3rd additional star
Vermilion Bird of the South (南方朱雀)	井	Jǐng	Well	北河	Běihé	North River	σ Gem		北河增四	Běihézēngsì	4th additional star
Vermilion Bird of the South (南方朱雀)	井	Jǐng	Well	天樽	Tiānzūn	Celestial Wine Cup					
Vermilion Bird of the South (南方朱雀)	井	Jǐng	Well	天樽	Tiānzūn	Celestial Wine Cup	57 Gem		天樽一	Tiānzūnyī	1st star
Vermilion Bird of the South (南方朱雀)	井	Jǐng	Well	天樽	Tiānzūn	Celestial Wine Cup	δ Gem	Wasat			
Vermilion Bird of the South (南方朱雀)	井	Jǐng	Well	天樽	Tiānzūn	Celestial Wine Cup	δ Gem	Wasat	天樽二	Tiānzūnèr	2nd star
Vermilion Bird of the South (南方朱雀)	井	Jǐng	Well	天樽	Tiānzūn	Celestial Wine Cup	δ Gem	Wasat	天樽距星	Tiānzūnjùxīng	Separated star
Vermilion Bird of the South (南方朱雀)	井	Jǐng	Well	天樽	Tiānzūn	Celestial Wine Cup	δ Gem	Wasat	天樽西星	Tiānzūnxīxīng	Western star
Vermilion Bird of the South (南方朱雀)	井	Jǐng	Well	天樽	Tiānzūn	Celestial Wine Cup	ω Gem		天樽三	Tiānzūnsān	3rd star
Vermilion Bird of the South (南方朱雀)	井	Jǐng	Well	天樽	Tiānzūn	Celestial Wine Cup	37 Gem		天樽增一	Tiānzūnzēngyī	1st additional star
Vermilion Bird of the South (南方朱雀)	井	Jǐng	Well	天樽	Tiānzūn	Celestial Wine Cup	40 Gem		天樽增二	Tiānzūnzēngèr	2nd additional star
Vermilion Bird of the South (南方朱雀)	井	Jǐng	Well	天樽	Tiānzūn	Celestial Wine Cup	47 Gem		天樽增三	Tiānzūnzēngsān	3rd additional star
Vermilion Bird of the South (南方朱雀)	井	Jǐng	Well	天樽	Tiānzūn	Celestial Wine Cup	52 Gem		天樽增四	Tiānzūnzēngsì	4th additional star
Vermilion Bird of the South (南方朱雀)	井	Jǐng	Well	天樽	Tiānzūn	Celestial Wine Cup	48 Gem		天樽增五	Tiānzūnzēngwǔ	5th additional star
Vermilion Bird of the South (南方朱雀)	井	Jǐng	Well	天樽	Tiānzūn	Celestial Wine Cup	44 Gem		天樽增六	Tiānzūnzēngliù	6th additional star
Vermilion Bird of the South (南方朱雀)	井	Jǐng	Well	天樽	Tiānzūn	Celestial Wine Cup	56 Gem		天樽增七	Tiānzūnzēngqī	7th additional star
Vermilion Bird of the South (南方朱雀)	井	Jǐng	Well	天樽	Tiānzūn	Celestial Wine Cup	61 Gem		天樽增八	Tiānzūnzēngbā	8th additional star
Vermilion Bird of the South (南方朱雀)	井	Jǐng	Well	天樽	Tiānzūn	Celestial Wine Cup	63 Gem		天樽增九	Tiānzūnzēngjiǔ	9th additional star
Vermilion Bird of the South (南方朱雀)	井	Jǐng	Well	五諸侯	Wuzhūhóu	Five Feudal Kings					
Vermilion Bird of the South (南方朱雀)	井	Jǐng	Well	五諸侯	Wuzhūhóu	Five Feudal Kings	θ Gem				
Vermilion Bird of the South (南方朱雀)	井	Jǐng	Well	五諸侯	Wuzhūhóu	Five Feudal Kings	θ Gem		五諸侯一	Wuzhūhóuyī	1st star
Vermilion Bird of the South (南方朱雀)	井	Jǐng	Well	五諸侯	Wuzhūhóu	Five Feudal Kings	θ Gem		帝師	Dishī	Imperial Preceptor
Vermilion Bird of the South (南方朱雀)	井	Jǐng	Well	五諸侯	Wuzhūhóu	Five Feudal Kings	θ Gem		天街南星	Tiānjiēnánxīn	Star in the south of Celestial Street constellation
Vermilion Bird of the South (南方朱雀)	井	Jǐng	Well	五諸侯	Wuzhūhóu	Five Feudal Kings	τ Gem				
Vermilion Bird of the South (南方朱雀)	井	Jǐng	Well	五諸侯	Wuzhūhóu	Five Feudal Kings	τ Gem		五諸侯二	Wuzhūhóuèr	2nd star
Vermilion Bird of the South (南方朱雀)	井	Jǐng	Well	五諸侯	Wuzhūhóu	Five Feudal Kings	τ Gem		帝友	Dìyǒu	
Vermilion Bird of the South (南方朱雀)	井	Jǐng	Well	五諸侯	Wuzhūhóu	Five Feudal Kings	ι Gem				
Vermilion Bird of the South (南方朱雀)	井	Jǐng	Well	五諸侯	Wuzhūhóu	Five Feudal Kings	ι Gem		五諸侯三	Wuzhūhóusān	3rd star
Vermilion Bird of the South (南方朱雀)	井	Jǐng	Well	五諸侯	Wuzhūhóu	Five Feudal Kings	ι Gem		五諸侯第三星	Wuzhūhóudìsānxīng	3rd king (star) of five kings
Vermilion Bird of the South (南方朱雀)	井	Jǐng	Well	五諸侯	Wuzhūhóu	Five Feudal Kings	ι Gem		附耳	Fùěr	
Vermilion Bird of the South (南方朱雀)	井	Jǐng	Well	五諸侯	Wuzhūhóu	Five Feudal Kings	υ Gem				
Vermilion Bird of the South (南方朱雀)	井	Jǐng	Well	五諸侯	Wuzhūhóu	Five Feudal Kings	υ Gem		五諸侯四	Wuzhūhóusì	4th star
Vermilion Bird of the South (南方朱雀)	井	Jǐng	Well	五諸侯	Wuzhūhóu	Five Feudal Kings	υ Gem		伯是	Bàshì	
Vermilion Bird of the South (南方朱雀)	井	Jǐng	Well	五諸侯	Wuzhūhóu	Five Feudal Kings	φ Gem				
Vermilion Bird of the South (南方朱雀)	井	Jǐng	Well	五諸侯	Wuzhūhóu	Five Feudal Kings	φ Gem		五諸侯五	Wuzhūhóuwu	5th star
Vermilion Bird of the South (南方朱雀)	井	Jǐng	Well	五諸侯	Wuzhūhóu	Five Feudal Kings	φ Gem		太史	Tàishì	
Vermilion Bird of the South (南方朱雀)	井	Jǐng	Well	五諸侯	Wuzhūhóu	Five Feudal Kings	59 Gem		五諸侯增一	Wuzhūhóuzēngyī	1st additional star
Vermilion Bird of the South (南方朱雀)	井	Jǐng	Well	五諸侯	Wuzhūhóu	Five Feudal Kings	64 Gem		五諸侯增二	Wuzhūhóuzēngèr	2nd additional star
Vermilion Bird of the South (南方朱雀)	井	Jǐng	Well	五諸侯	Wuzhūhóu	Five Feudal Kings	65 Gem		五諸侯增三	Wuzhūhóuzēngsān	3rd additional star
Vermilion Bird of the South (南方朱雀)	井	Jǐng	Well	積薪	Jīxīn	Pile of Firewood					
Vermilion Bird of the South (南方朱雀)	井	Jǐng	Well	積薪	Jīxīn	Pile of Firewood	κ Gem				
Vermilion Bird of the South (南方朱雀)	井	Jǐng	Well	積薪	Jīxīn	Pile of Firewood	κ Gem		積薪	Jīxīn	(One star of)
Vermilion Bird of the South (南方朱雀)	井	Jǐng	Well	積薪	Jīxīn	Pile of Firewood	κ Gem		五诸侯第五星	Wuzhūhóudìwuxīng	5th king (star) of five kings
Vermilion Bird of the South (南方朱雀)	井	Jǐng	Well	積薪	Jīxīn	Pile of Firewood	76 Gem		積薪增一	Jīxīnzēngyī	1st additional star
Vermilion Bird of the South (南方朱雀)	井	Jǐng	Well	積薪	Jīxīn	Pile of Firewood	82 Gem		積薪增二	Jīxīnzēngèr	2nd additional star
Vermilion Bird of the South (南方朱雀)	井	Jǐng	Well	積薪	Jīxīn	Pile of Firewood	84 Gem		積薪增三	Jīxīnzēngsān	3rd additional star
Vermilion Bird of the South (南方朱雀)	井	Jǐng	Well	水位	Shuǐwèi	Water Level					
Vermilion Bird of the South (南方朱雀)	井	Jǐng	Well	水位	Shuǐwèi	Water Level	68 Gem		水位增二	Shuǐwèizēngèr	2nd additional starr
Vermilion Bird of the South (南方朱雀)	井	Jǐng	Well	水位	Shuǐwèi	Water Level	74 Gem		水位增三	Shuǐwèizēngsān	3rd additional star
Vermilion Bird of the South (南方朱雀)	井	Jǐng	Well	水位	Shuǐwèi	Water Level	81 Gem		水位增四	Shuǐwèizēngsì	4th additional star
Vermilion Bird of the South (南方朱雀)	井	Jǐng	Well	水位	Shuǐwèi	Water Level	85 Gem		水位增五	Shuǐwèizēngwǔ	5th additional star
Vermilion Bird of the South (南方朱雀)	井	Jǐng	Well	水位	Shuǐwèi	Water Level	HD 59764		水位增十二	Shuǐwèizēngshíèr	12th additional star
Vermilion Bird of the South (南方朱雀)	井	Jǐng	Well	四瀆	Sìdú	Four Great Rivers	HD 52960		四瀆一	Sìdúyī	1st star
Vermilion Bird of the South (南方朱雀)	鬼	Guǐ	Ghost	爟	Guàn	Beacon Fire	χ Gem		爟增三	Guànzēngsān	3rd additional star

== See also ==
- Traditional Chinese star names
- Chinese constellations
