= Medusa Nebula =

Planetary nebula in constellation Gemini

Emission nebula
- Planetary nebula
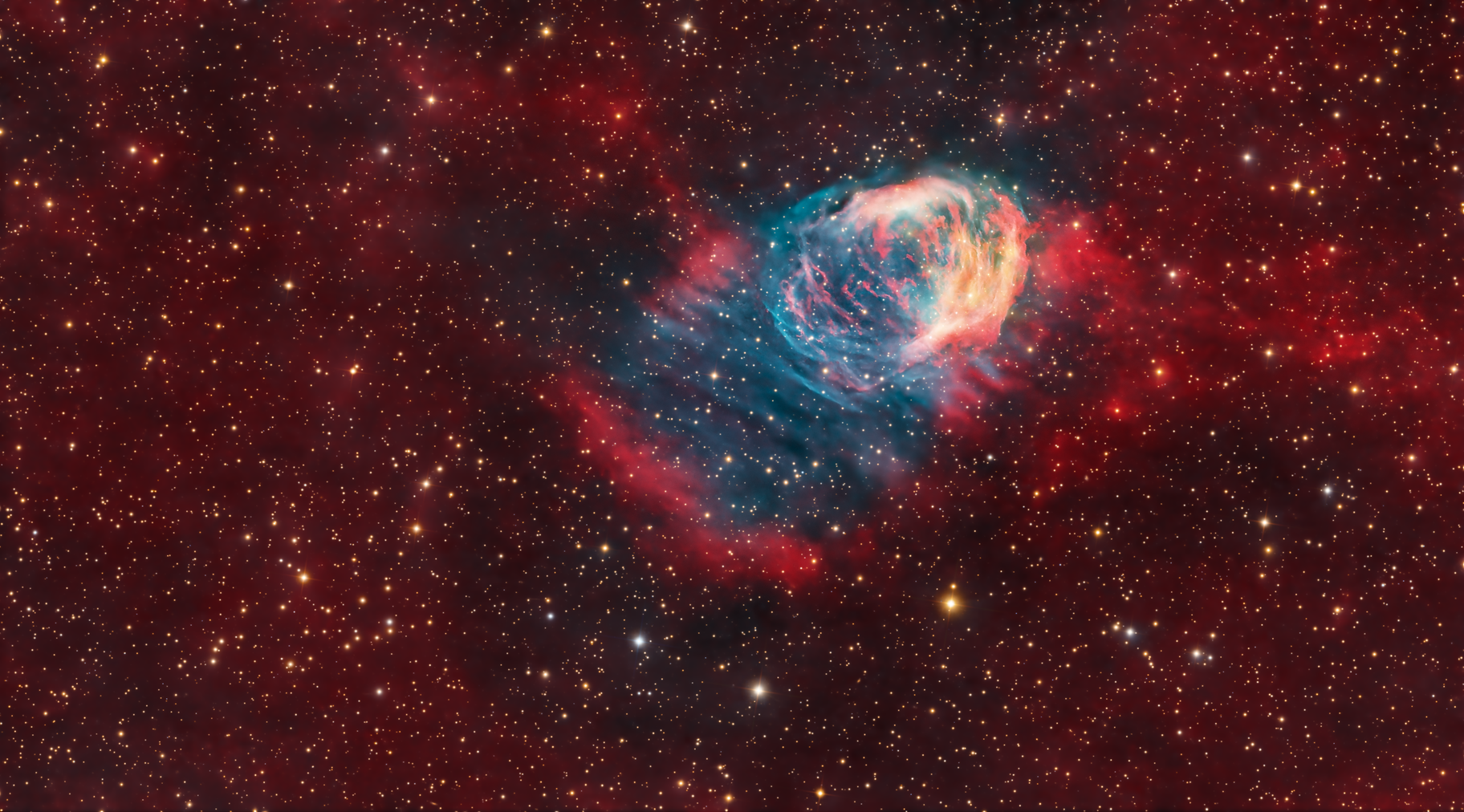
- Medusa Nebula, Hunter Outten & Kaleb Jordan

Observation data: J2000.0 epoch
- Right ascension: 07^{h} 29^{m} 02.69^{s}
- Declination: +13° 14′ 48.4″
- Distance: 1,500 ly (460 pc) ly
- Apparent magnitude (V): 15.99
- Apparent dimensions (V): 10.25 x 10.25 arcmin
- Constellation: Gemini

Physical characteristics
- Radius: 4 ly
- Absolute magnitude (V): 7.68
- Notable features: Very large & very low surface brightness
- Designations: Sharpless 2-274, PK 205+14 1, Abell 21

The Medusa Nebula is a planetary nebula in the constellation of Gemini. It is also known as Abell 21 and Sharpless 2-274. It was originally discovered in 1955 by University of California, Los Angeles astronomer George O. Abell, who classified it as an old planetary nebula. With the computation of expansion velocities and the thermal character of the radio emission, Soviet astronomers in 1971 concluded that it was most likely a planetary nebula. As the nebula is so large, its surface brightness is very low, with surface magnitudes of between +15.99 and +25 reported.

The central star of the planetary nebula is a PG 1159 star.

== See also ==
- Abell Catalog of Planetary Nebulae
- List of planetary nebulae
- Geminga, Gemini gamma-ray source
- Gemini in Chinese astronomy
- IC 444, reflection nebula
- Messier 35 open cluster
- Cancer Minor (constellation) - Obsolete constellation inside modern Gemini
