= NGC 2371-2 =

Dual-lobed planetary nebula in the constellation Gemini

NGC 2371
Emission nebula
- Planetary nebula
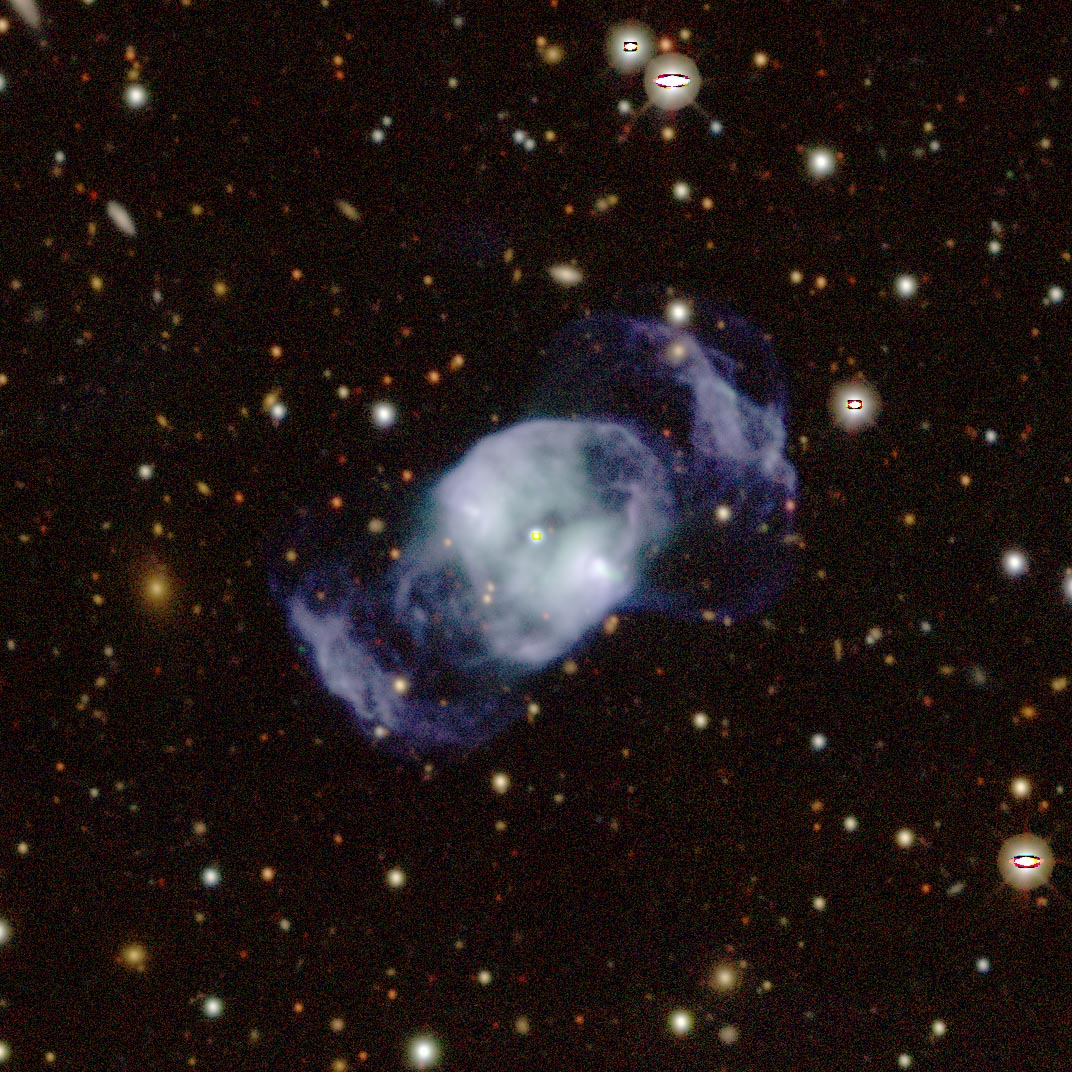
- NGC 2371-2

Observation data: J2000 epoch
- Right ascension: 07^{h} 25^{m} 34.7^{s}
- Declination: +29° 29′ 25.6″
- Distance: 4400 ly ly
- Apparent magnitude (V): 11.2
- Apparent dimensions (V): 1′
- Constellation: Gemini
- Designations: NGC 2371, NGC 2372

NGC 2371-2 (consisting of NGC 2371 and NGC 2372) is a dual lobed planetary nebula located in the northern constellation of Gemini. Visually, it appears like it could be two separate objects; therefore, two entries were given to the planetary nebula by John Louis Emil Dreyer in the New General Catalogue, so it may be referred to as NGC 2371, NGC 2372, or variations on this name. It has also been called the Double Bubble Nebula.

The central star of the planetary nebula has a spectral type of [WO1], indicating a spectrum similar to that of an oxygen-rich Wolf–Rayet star.

== Observations ==
NGC 2371-2 is in the constellation of Gemini which is visible in the latitudes between +90° and −60°. The planetary nebula appears southwest of Castor, and is located at a distance of 4400 light years.

At 13th magnitude, this nebula is well within the limits of most amateur telescopes. Like most planetary nebulae, this one responds well to both high magnification and narrow-band filters, especially an OIII emission filter. It is listed within the RASC's 110 Finest NGC List.

== Gallery ==
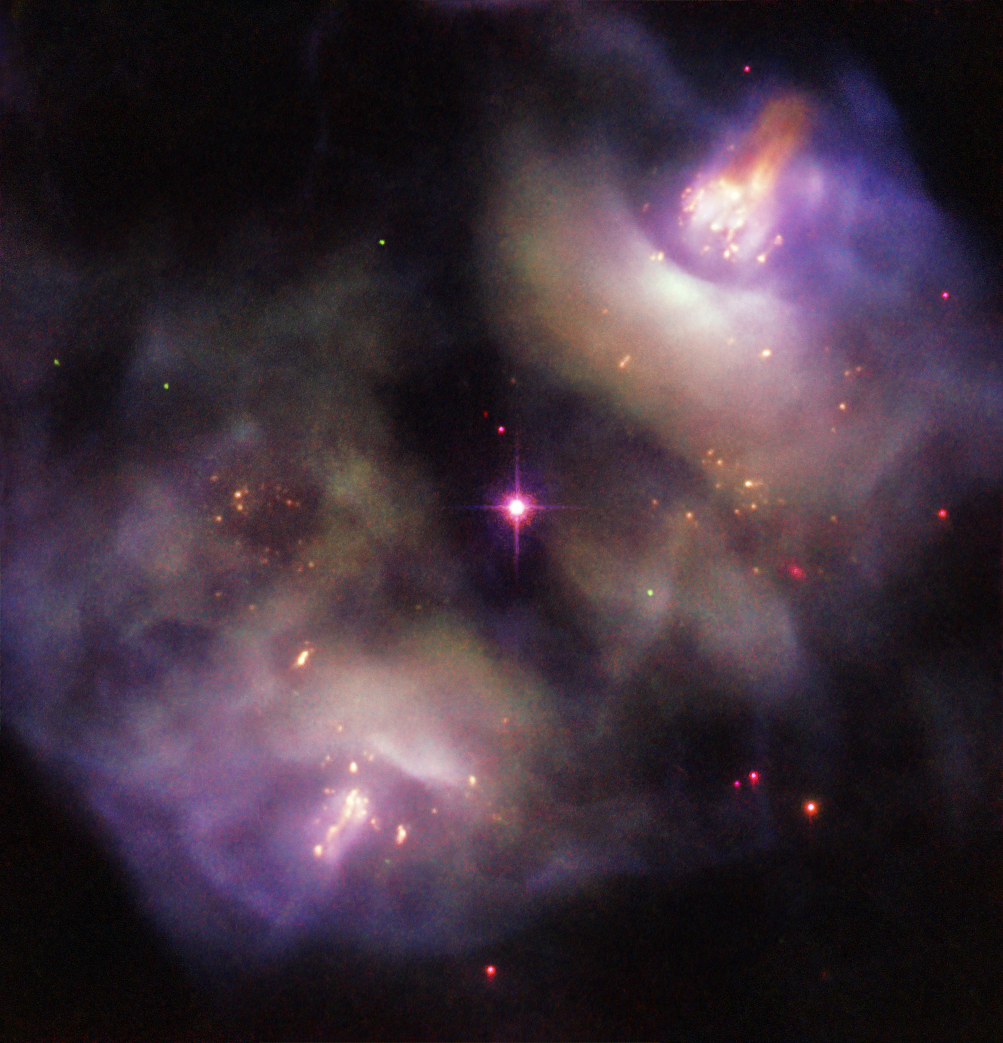
NGC 2371 taken by HST.

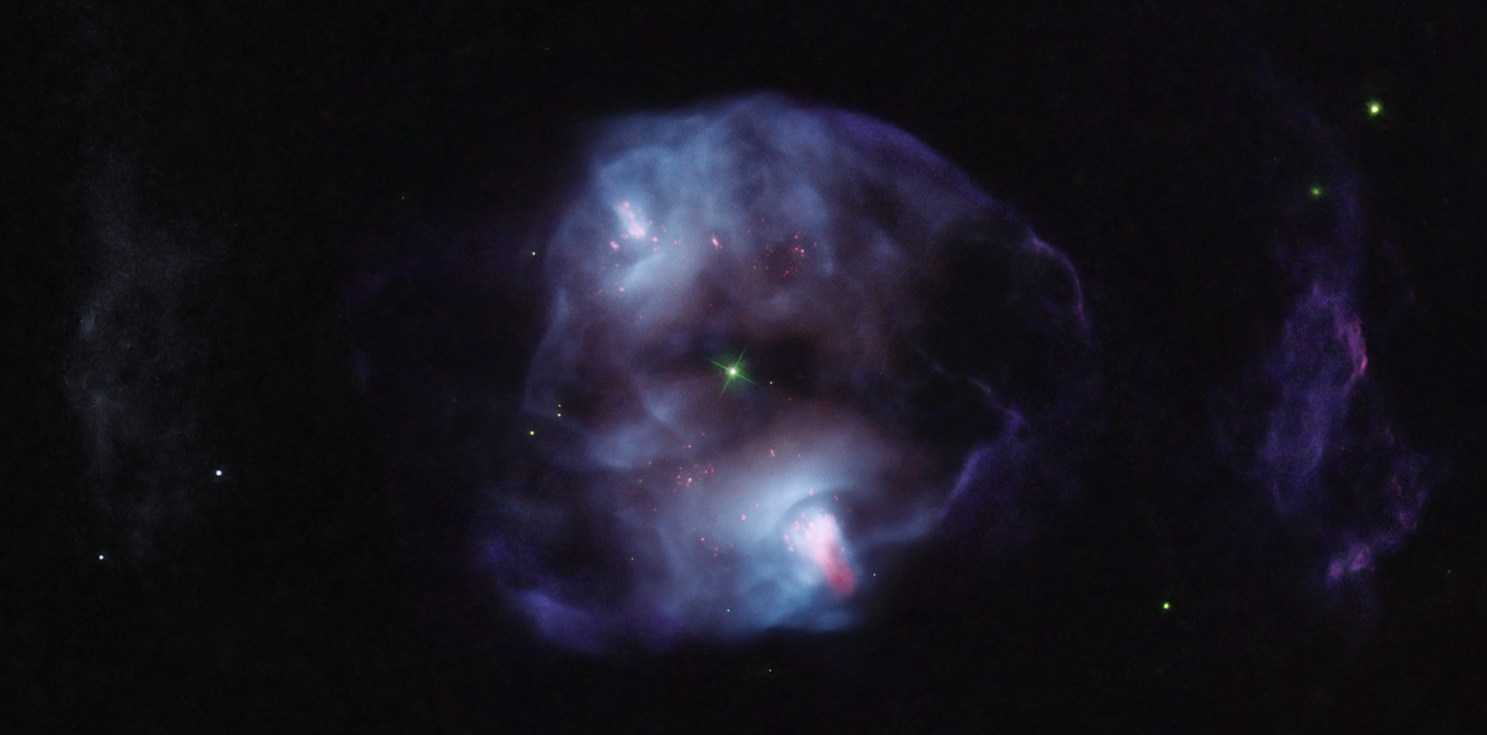
NGC 2371 with WFPC2

== See also ==
- Gemini in Chinese astronomy
- Cancer Minor (constellation) – Obsolete constellation inside modern Gemini
