= Iota Geminorum =

G-type star in the constellation Gemini

ι Geminorum
- Location of ι Geminorum (circled in red)

Observation data Epoch J2000.0 Equinox J2000.0 (ICRS)
- Constellation: Gemini
- Right ascension: 07^{h} 25^{m} 43.59532^{s}
- Declination: +27° 47′ 53.0929″
- Apparent magnitude (V): 3.791

Characteristics
- Evolutionary stage: Red-giant branch
- Spectral type: G9 III
- U−B color index: +0.88
- B−V color index: +1.01

Astrometry
Radial velocity (R_{v})	7.26±0.16 km/s
Proper motion (μ)	RA: −122.66 mas/yr Dec.: −84.03 mas/yr
Parallax (π)	27.10±0.20 mas
Distance	120.4 ± 0.9 ly (36.9 ± 0.3 pc)
Absolute magnitude (M_{V})	+0.859

Details
Mass	1.89 M_{☉}
Radius	9.48±0.12 R_{☉}
Luminosity	53.7±2.8 L_{☉}
Surface gravity (log g)	2.8 cgs
Temperature	5,072±68 K
Metallicity [Fe/H]	−0.17 dex
Rotational velocity (v sin i)	0.0 km/s
Age	4.16±2.54 Gyr

Other designations
- ι Gem, 60 Gem, BD+28°1385, FK5 282, HD 58207, HIP 36046, HR 2821, SAO 79374

Database references
SIMBAD	data

Iota Geminorum (ι Geminorum, ι Gem) is a solitary fourth-magnitude star in the constellation Gemini. In the sky, it forms an isosceles triangle with Castor and Pollux, and is located less than a degree from the 5th magnitude stars 64 and 65 Geminorum.

== Nomenclature ==
In Chinese, 五諸侯 (Wu Zhū Hóu), meaning Five Feudal Kings, refers to an asterism consisting of ι Geminorum, θ Geminorum, τ Geminorum, υ Geminorum and φ Geminorum. Consequently, ι Geminorum itself is known as 五諸侯三 (Wu Zhū Hóu sān, English: the Third Star of Five Feudal Kings). It has been called by the proper name Propus, meaning "forefoot" in Latin, but this name is more correctly assigned to η Geminorum.

== Properties ==
Based upon an annual parallax shift of 27.10 mass, Iota Geminorum lies some 120.4 light years from the Sun. This is an evolved red-giant branch giant star with a stellar classification of G9 III. It is most likely a member of the galactic thin disk population. The star has 1.89 times the mass of the Sun, but has expanded to 9.5 times the solar radius. It shines with 54 times the Sun's luminosity from its outer atmosphere at an effective temperature of 5,072 K.
