= NGC 2277 =

Open cluster in the constellation Gemini

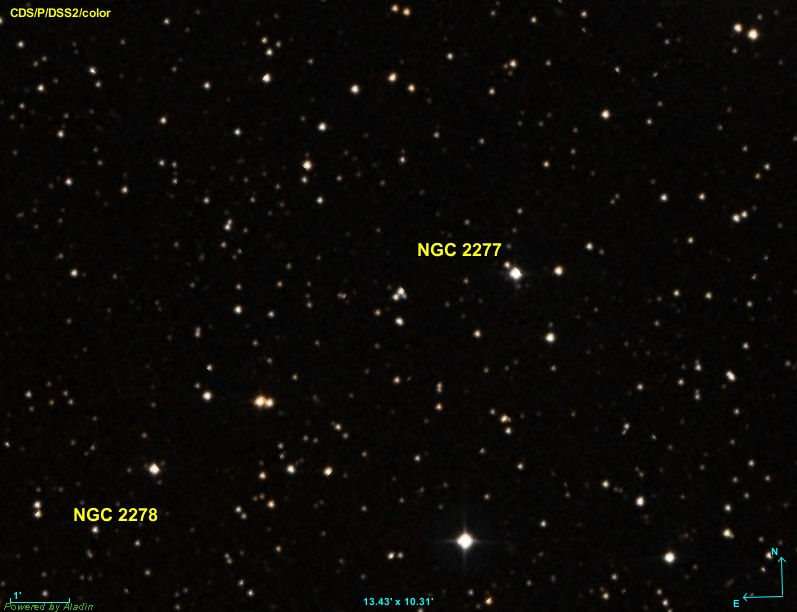

Observation data (J2000 epoch)
- Right ascension: 06^{h} 47^{m} 47.0^{s}
- Declination: +33° 27′ 05″
- Apparent dimensions (V): 0.6′ × 0.3′

Physical characteristics
- Asterism

Associations
- Constellation: Gemini

NGC 2277 is what appears to be an open cluster in the constellation Gemini. It was first observed on 20 April 1865 by the German astronomer Heinrich Louis d'Arrest. However, it is simply an asterism formed by several stars in the sky appearing close together.

== See also ==
- List of NGC objects
