= NGC 2342 =

Galaxy in the constellation Gemini

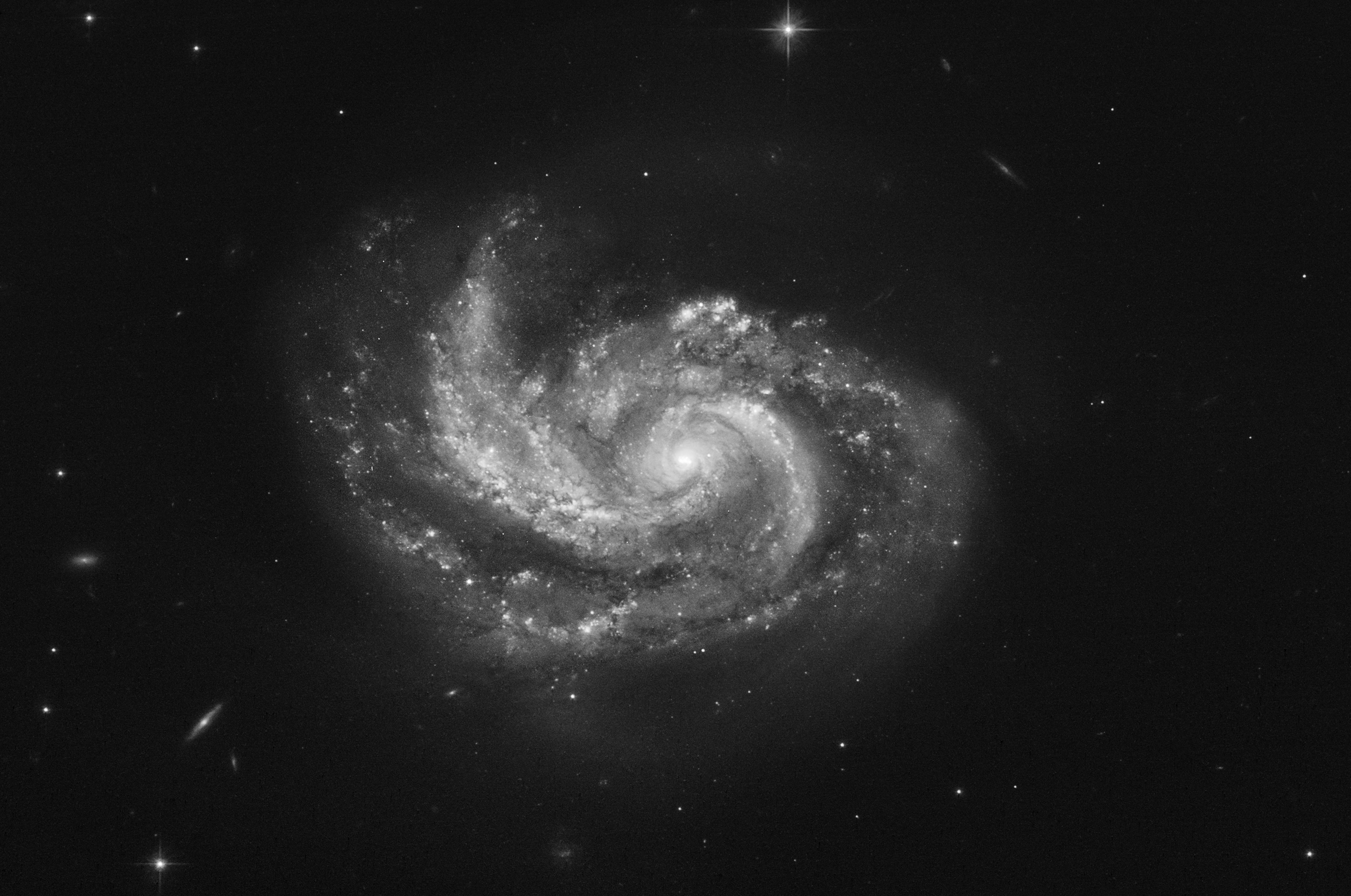
- NGC 2342 imaged by the Hubble Space Telescope

Observation data (J2000 epoch)
- Constellation: Gemini
- Right ascension: 07^{h} 09^{m} 18.0802^{s}
- Declination: +20° 38′ 09.762″
- Redshift: 0.017652
- Heliocentric radial velocity: 5291 ± 2 km/s
- Distance: 261.9 ± 18.3 Mly (80.29 ± 5.62 Mpc)
- Apparent magnitude (V): 12.6

Characteristics
- Type: S pec
- Size: ~149,200 ly (45.73 kpc) (estimated)
- Apparent size (V): 1.4′ × 1.3′

Other designations
- HOLM 086A, IRAS 07063+2043, 2MASX J07091808+2038092, UGC 3709, MCG +03-19-004, PGC 20265, CGCG 086-007

NGC 2342 is a spiral galaxy in the constellation of Gemini. Its velocity with respect to the cosmic microwave background is 5445 ± 11 km/s, which corresponds to a Hubble distance of 80.31 ± 5.62 Mpc (~262 million light-years). It was discovered by German astronomer Albert Marth on 10 November 1864.

NGC 2342 is a luminous infrared galaxy (LIRG). Together with NGC 2341, they both form a gravitationally bound galaxy pair listed as HOLM 86.

== Supernovae ==
Two supernovae have been observed in NGC 2342:

- SN 2023vck (Type Ib, mag 19.917) was discovered by the Zwicky Transient Facility on 15 October 2023.
- SN 2025aebt (Type Ib, mag. 19.173) was discovered by ATLAS on 17 November 2025.

== See also ==
- List of NGC objects (2001–3000)
