= Gliese 251 =

Star in the constellation Gemini

- Location of Gliese 251 in the constellation Gemini

Observation data Epoch J2000 Equinox ICRS
- Constellation: Gemini
- Right ascension: 06^{h} 54^{m} 48.95806^{s}
- Declination: +33° 16′ 05.4383″
- Apparent magnitude (V): +10.11

Characteristics
- Evolutionary stage: main sequence
- Spectral type: M3.0Ve
- U−B color index: +1.20
- B−V color index: +1.60

Astrometry
Radial velocity (R_{v})	22.30±0.19 km/s
Proper motion (μ)	RA: -726.672 mas/yr Dec.: -398.102 mas/yr
Parallax (π)	179.0629±0.0280 mas
Distance	18.215 ± 0.003 ly (5.5846 ± 0.0009 pc)
Absolute magnitude (M_{V})	+11.12

Details
Mass	0.360±0.015 M_{☉}
Radius	0.364±0.011 R_{☉}
Luminosity	0.0155±0.0004 L_{☉}
Surface gravity (log g)	4.87±0.05 cgs
Temperature	3342±24 K
Metallicity [Fe/H]	+0.07+0.07 −0.06 dex
Rotation	122.1+1.9 −2.2 d
Rotational velocity (v sin i)	≤2 km/s
Age	6.8+4.6 −4.7 Gyr

Other designations
- GJ 251, HD 265866, HIP 33226, LHS 1879, LTT 11941, Wolf 294, TIC 68581262, 2MASS J06544902+3316058

Database references
SIMBAD	data
Exoplanet Archive	data
ARICNS	data

Gliese 251, also known as HIP 33226 or HD 265866, is a star located 18.2 light-years away from the Solar System. Located in the constellation of Gemini, it is the nearest star in this constellation. It is located near the boundary with Auriga, 49 arcminutes away from the bright star Theta Geminorum; due to its apparent magnitude of +9.89 it cannot be observed with the naked eye. The closest star to Gliese 251 is QY Aurigae, which is located 3.5 light years away.

Gliese 251 is a red dwarf with a spectral type of M3V with an effective temperature of about 3300 K. Its mass has been measured to be around 0.36 solar masses and its radius is about 36% solar radii. Its metallicity is likely slightly less than that of the Sun. Observations at infrared wavelengths rule out the presence of a circumstellar disk around it.

== Planetary system ==
In 2019, two candidate planets were detected by the radial velocity method to orbit Gliese 251 at orbits of 1.74 and 607 days. However, a new study in 2020 using CARMENES data refuted both candidates, as they found that both signals were caused by stellar activity. Based on the CARMENES data, the team announced that Gliese 251 is orbited by one single super-Earth (Gliese 251 b) at an orbit of 14.238 days. In 2025, a second planet (c) was confirmed which is also a super-Earth and orbits within the circumstellar habitable zone. It may be possible to directly image planet c with next-generation telescopes such as the Thirty Meter Telescope.

The Gliese 251 planetary system
Companion (in order from star)	Mass	Semimajor axis (AU)	Orbital period (days)	Eccentricity	Inclination (°)	Radius
b	≥3.85+0.35 −0.33 M_{🜨}	0.0808±0.0042	14.2370±0.0015	0	—	—
c	≥3.84±0.75 M_{🜨}	0.196±0.014	53.647±0.044	0	—	—

== See also ==
- List of exoplanets discovered in 2020 - Gliese 251 b
