= 30 Geminorum =

Star in the constellation Gemini

- Location of 30 Geminorum (circled in red)

Observation data Epoch J2000 Equinox ICRS
- Constellation: Gemini
- Right ascension: 06^{h} 43^{m} 59.28697^{s}
- Declination: +13° 13′ 40.8188″
- Apparent magnitude (V): 4.49

Characteristics
- Evolutionary stage: red clump
- Spectral type: K0+ III Ca1
- B−V color index: 1.167±0.006

Astrometry
Radial velocity (R_{v})	+9.50±0.25 km/s
Proper motion (μ)	RA: −0.269 mas/yr Dec.: −53.503 mas/yr
Parallax (π)	10.9027±0.2048 mas
Distance	299 ± 6 ly (92 ± 2 pc)
Absolute magnitude (M_{V})	−0.25

Details
Mass	2.29±0.62 M_{☉}
Radius	22.4+0.5 −0.8 R_{☉}
Luminosity	188.9±4.1 L_{☉}
Surface gravity (log g)	2.18±0.11 cgs
Temperature	4,518+82 −47 K
Metallicity [Fe/H]	−0.11±0.05 dex
Rotational velocity (v sin i)	2.7 km/s
Age	1.20+0.31 −0.25 Gyr

Other designations
- 30 Gem, BD+13°1390, HD 48433, HIP 32249, HR 2478, SAO 96051, WDS J06440+1314

Database references
SIMBAD	data

30 Geminorum is a suspected astrometric binary star system in the northern zodiac constellation of Gemini. It is visible to the naked eye as a faint, orange-hued point of light with an apparent visual magnitude of 4.49. The distance to this star, as estimated through the use of parallax, is about 299 light years. It is drifting further away from the Sun with a heliocentric radial velocity of +9.5 km/s.

This is an aging giant star with a stellar classification of K0+ III Ca1, having exhausted the supply of hydrogen at its core and expanded to 22 times the Sun's radius. The suffix notation indicates it displays an overabundance of calcium in its spectrum. It is a red clump giant, which means it is on the horizontal branch and is generating energy through helium fusion at its core. The star is about 1.2 billion years old with 2.3 times the Sun's mass. It is radiating 189 times the luminosity of the Sun from its enlarged photosphere at an effective temperature of 4,518 K.

There is a 13th magnitude visual companion located at an angular separation of 21.20″ along a position angle of 187° from the brighter star, as of 2011.
