= 1 Geminorum =

Triple star system in the constellation Gemini

- Location of 1 Geminorum (circled)

Observation data Epoch J2000 Equinox J2000
- Constellation: Gemini
- Right ascension: 06^{h} 04^{m} 07.21544^{s}
- Declination: +23° 15′ 48.0401″
- Apparent magnitude (V): 4.15 (4.77 / 5.50)

Characteristics
- Evolutionary stage: red clump
- Spectral type: K0III + (F6IV + G2V)
- U−B color index: +0.53
- B−V color index: +0.83
- Variable type: suspected

Astrometry
Radial velocity (R_{v})	22.39 ± 0.28 km/s
Proper motion (μ)	RA: -1.61 mas/yr Dec.: -118.33 mas/yr
Parallax (π)	21.39±0.03 mas
Distance	152.5 ± 0.2 ly (46.75 ± 0.07 pc)
Absolute magnitude (M_{V})	0.84

Orbit
Primary	1 Gem A
Companion	1 Gem B
Period (P)	4,877.6±1.0 d
Semi-major axis (a)	0.2010±0.0004" (9.399±0.010 au)
Eccentricity (e)	0.3709±0.0004
Inclination (i)	59.33±0.04°
Longitude of the node (Ω)	353.67±0.04°
Periastron epoch (T)	2445119±2.3
Argument of periastron (ω) (secondary)	21.29±0.09°
Semi-amplitude (K_{1}) (primary)	11.34±0.03 km/s
Semi-amplitude (K_{2}) (secondary)	8.07±0.04 km/s

Orbit
Primary	1 Gem Ba
Companion	1 Gem Bb
Period (P)	9.60 d
Semi-major axis (a)	0.002638±0.000005" (0.1234±0.0001 au)
Eccentricity (e)	0.0024±0.0005
Inclination (i)	93.2±1.1°
Longitude of the node (Ω)	137.5±1.9°
Argument of periastron (ω) (secondary)	154.3±11.8°
Semi-amplitude (K_{1}) (primary)	52.0±0.1 km/s
Semi-amplitude (K_{2}) (secondary)	87.7±0.2 km/s

Details

1 Gem A
Mass	1.94 ± 0.01 M_{☉}
Surface gravity (log g)	3.1 cgs
Metallicity [Fe/H]	-0.01 dex

1 Gem Ba
Mass	1.707 ± 0.005 M_{☉}

1 Gem Bb
Mass	1.012 ± 0.003 M_{☉}

Other designations
- NSV 16765, BD+23°1170, FK5 1163, HD 41116, HIP 28734, HR 2134, SAO 77915

Database references
SIMBAD	1 Gem

1 Geminorum (1 Gem) is a star in the constellation Gemini. Its apparent magnitude is 4.15.

In the 19th century, John Flamsteed numbered the brighter stars, by constellation, from west to east, and 1 Geminorum was the first star listed in Gemini. It is also listed in the Bright Star Catalogue as star 2134, usually designated HR 2134 with the HR standing for the Harvard Revised catalog, the precursor to the Bright Star Catalogue.

In 1948, 1 Geminorum was discovered to be a close double star whilst using it to focus a telescope for observations of the planet Uranus. From initial observations of the spectrum, it was estimated that both components were giants and that the secondary was itself double. Radial velocity variations had been found in 1906, but only one set of absorption lines could be detected in the spectrum and it was not possible to calculate a reliable orbit until 1976.

1 Geminorum is a triple star system 0.17 degree south of the ecliptic. The primary component of the system, 1 Geminorum A, is a K-type red clump giant star around twice the mass of the Sun. Component A is orbited by a spectroscopic binary pair of stars at a separation of about 9.4 astronomical units every 4877.6 days. The two secondary components, 1 Geminorum Ba and Bb, have not been resolved, but regular periodic Doppler shifts in the spectrum indicate orbital motion of a binary pairing consisting of an F-type subgiant and a solar-mass star that may be G-type, separated by approximately 0.1234 astronomical units.

In 1893, a 14th magnitude companion was reported by Sherburne Wesley Burnham 94″ from the naked-eye star, but it is a distant background object.

1 Geminorum is listed as a suspected variable star with an amplitude of 0.05 magnitudes.
