= 57 Geminorum =

Star in the constellation Gemini

- Location of 57 Geminorum (circled)

Observation data Epoch J2000.0 Equinox ICRS
- Constellation: Gemini
- Right ascension: 07^{h} 23^{m} 28.511^{s}
- Declination: +25° 03′ 01.91″
- Apparent magnitude (V): 5.018

Characteristics
- Spectral type: G8III
- U−B color index: +1.778
- B−V color index: +0.174

Astrometry
Radial velocity (R_{v})	5.43±0.13 km/s
Proper motion (μ)	RA: −66.676 mas/yr Dec.: −29.082 mas/yr
Parallax (π)	18.1774±0.1459 mas
Distance	179 ± 1 ly (55.0 ± 0.4 pc)
Absolute magnitude (M_{V})	1.66

Details
Mass	2.2 M_{☉}
Radius	7.1 R_{☉}
Luminosity	29 L_{☉}
Surface gravity (log g)	2.84 cgs
Temperature	4,902 K
Metallicity [Fe/H]	0.21 dex
Rotational velocity (v sin i)	1.3 km/s
Age	1.2 Gyr

Other designations
- A Geminorum, 57 Gem, HR 2808, HD 57727, BD+25°1660, HIP 35846, SAO 79352

Database references
SIMBAD	data

57 Geminorum (57 Gem) is a yellow giant star in the constellation Gemini, with an apparent magnitude of 5.0. At a distance of about 179 light years, it has a luminosity about 29 times the Sun's. With an age of about 1.2 billion years, it has evolved away from the main sequence and expanded to seven times the width of the Sun.

57 Geminorum is the star's Flamsteed designation. It also has the rarely-used Bayer designation A Geminorum.

The radial velocity of 57 Geminorum has been closely examined for indications that it may have orbiting exoplanets, but it shows a particularly stable radial velocity.
