= Omega Geminorum =

Star in the constellation Gemini

ω Geminorum
- Location of ω Geminorum (circled)

Observation data Epoch J2000.0 Equinox J2000.0 (ICRS)
- Constellation: Gemini
- Right ascension: 07^{h} 02^{m} 24.78033^{s}
- Declination: +24° 12′ 55.6051″
- Apparent magnitude (V): 5.18

Characteristics
- Spectral type: G5 II
- U−B color index: +0.68
- B−V color index: +0.95
- Variable type: Cepheid?

Astrometry
Radial velocity (R_{v})	−9.10±0.40 km/s
Proper motion (μ)	RA: −6.74 mas/yr Dec.: -0.25 mas/yr
Parallax (π)	2.19±0.26 mas
Distance	approx. 1,500 ly (approx. 460 pc)
Absolute magnitude (M_{V})	−3.41

Details
Mass	5.3 M_{☉}
Radius	55.6 R_{☉}
Luminosity	1,813 L_{☉}
Surface gravity (log g)	1.20 cgs
Temperature	5,090±12 K
Metallicity [Fe/H]	−0.02 dex
Rotational velocity (v sin i)	10 km/s
Age	14.8 Myr

Other designations
- ω Gem, 42 Geminorum, BD+24°1502, FK5 1182, HD 52497, HIP 33927, HR 2630, SAO 78999.

Database references
SIMBAD	data

Omega Geminorum, Latinized from ω Geminorum, is a star located in the middle of the northern zodiac constellation of Gemini. With an apparent visual magnitude of 5.18, it is faintly visible to the naked eye. According to the Bortle scale, it can be viewed from dark suburban skies. With an annual parallax shift of just 2.19 mas, it is located about 1,500 light years from the Sun.

This is an evolved bright giant star with a stellar classification of G5 II. It is positioned near the instability strip and in 1977 was listed as a candidate cepheid variable star with a luminosity amplitude of 0.086 and a period of 0.7282 days. The interferometer-measured angular diameter of this star is 1.47±0.21 mas. At its estimated distance, this yields a physical size of about 72 times the radius of the Sun. It has 6.3 times the mass of the Sun and radiates 1,813 times the solar luminosity from its outer atmosphere at an effective temperature of 5,090 K.
