= Eskimo Nebula =

Planetary nebula in the constellation Gemini

NGC 2392
Emission nebula
- Planetary nebula
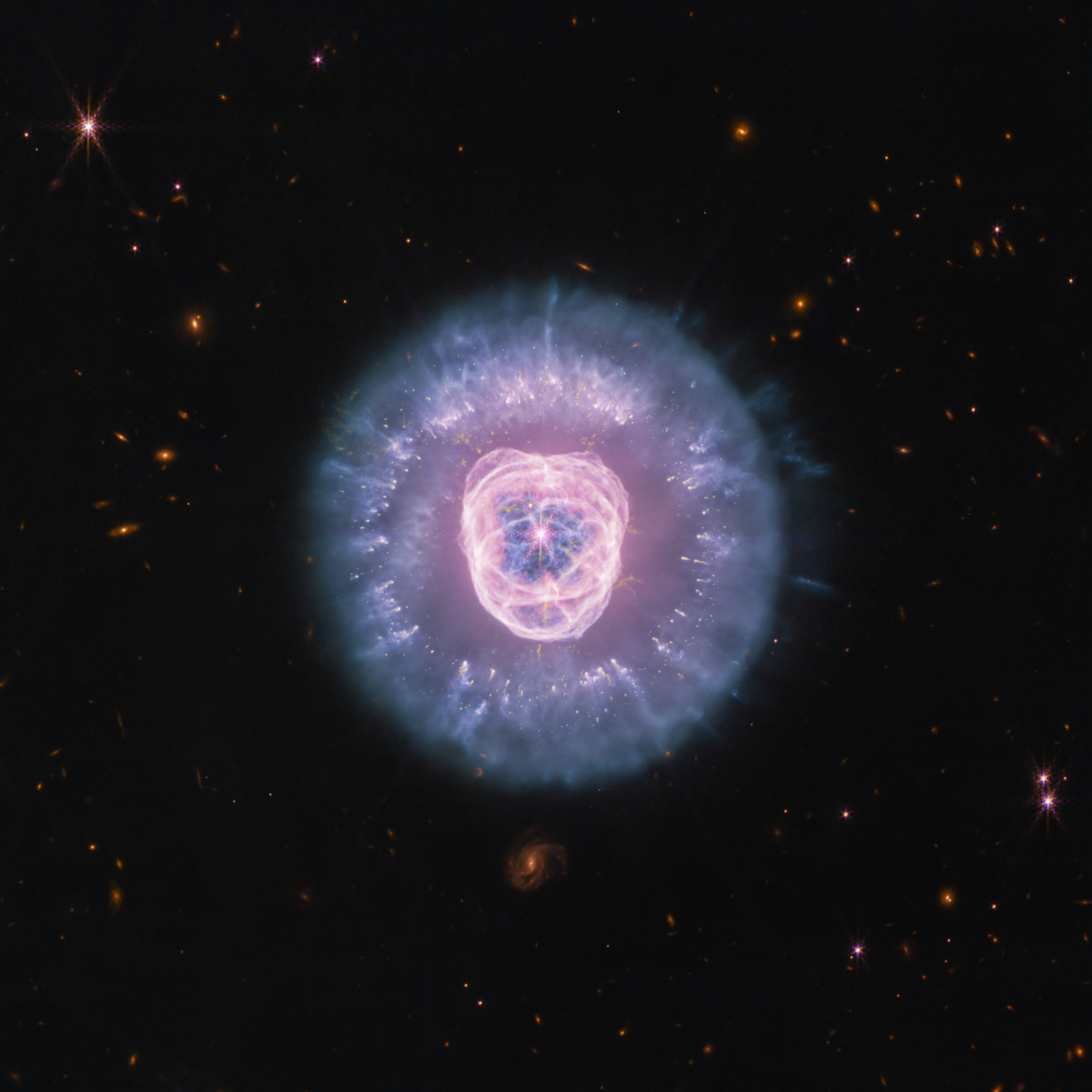
- NGC 2392, the Eskimo Nebula by JWST in 2026.

Observation data: J2000 epoch
- Right ascension: 07^{h} 29^{m} 10.7669^{s}
- Declination: +20° 54′ 42.488″
- Distance: 6,520±560 ly (2000±170 pc)
- Apparent magnitude (V): 9.1
- Apparent dimensions (V): 48″ × 48″
- Constellation: Gemini

Physical characteristics
- Radius: ≥0.34^{[a]} ly
- Absolute magnitude (V): ≤0.4^{[b]}
- Notable features: –
- Designations: NGC 2392, Caldwell 39, PN G197.8+17.3; Central Star: HIP 36369, HD 59088, TYC 1372-1287-1

The Eskimo Nebula is a bipolar, double-shell planetary nebula (PN) in the northern constellation of Gemini. Alternatively, it is known as NGC 2392, Clown Face Nebula, Lion Nebula, or Caldwell 39. This feature was discovered by German-British astronomer William Herschel in 1787. NGC 2392 lies about 6,500 light-years away, and is visible with a small telescope. The formation resembles a person's head surrounded by a parka hood. It is surrounded by gas that composed the ejected outer layers of a Sun-like star. The visible inner filaments are ejected by a strong wind of particles from the central stellar remnant. The outer disk contains unusual, light-year-long filaments.

At the center of NGC 2392, there is an O-type star (designated HD 59088) with a spectral type of O(H)6f.

== Historic data ==
The nebula was discovered by William Herschel on January 17, 1787, in Slough, England. He described it as "A star 9th magnitude with a pretty bright middle, nebulosity equally dispersed all around. A very remarkable phenomenon." NGC 2392 WH IV-45 is included in the Astronomical League's Herschel 400 observing program.

On 9 January 1982 it was occulted by the Moon during a Total Lunar Eclipse (the January 1982 lunar eclipse) over Greenland, the Arctic, the extreme northeast of North America, the northern half of Europe, North and Northeast Asia. This event was seen by several observers in England. The occultation during total eclipse will happen again during the January 2066 lunar eclipse over the northern half of Asia and the Northwest Pacific.

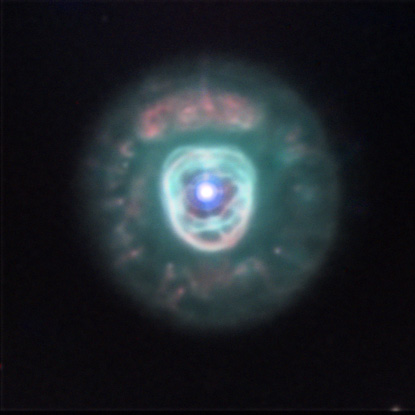
A true color image of NGC 2392.

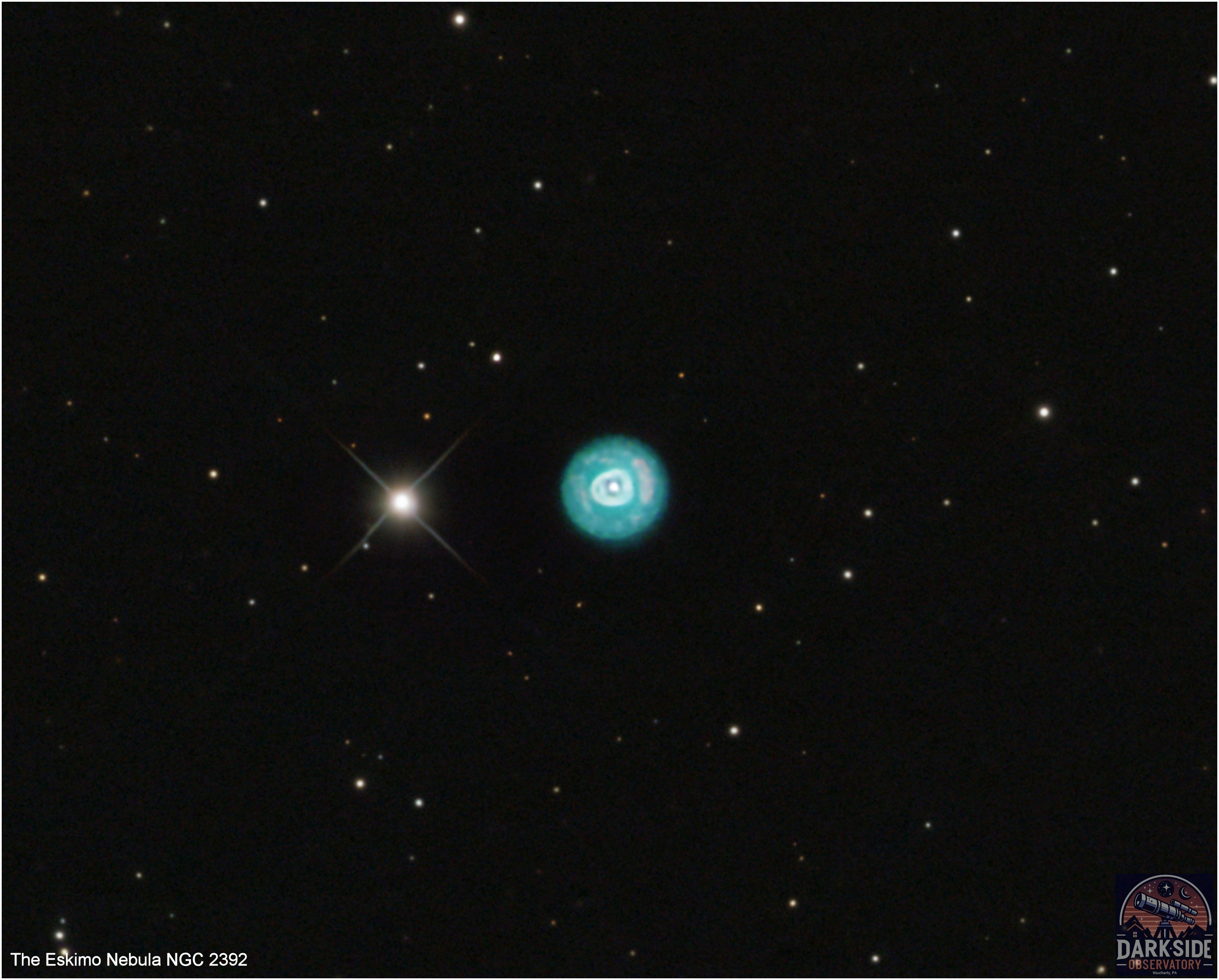
A wider field of view of NGC 2392

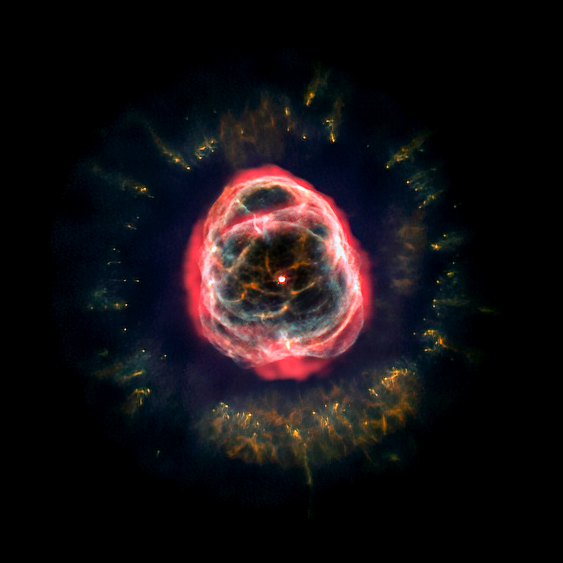
An optical and microwave composite image of NGC 2392

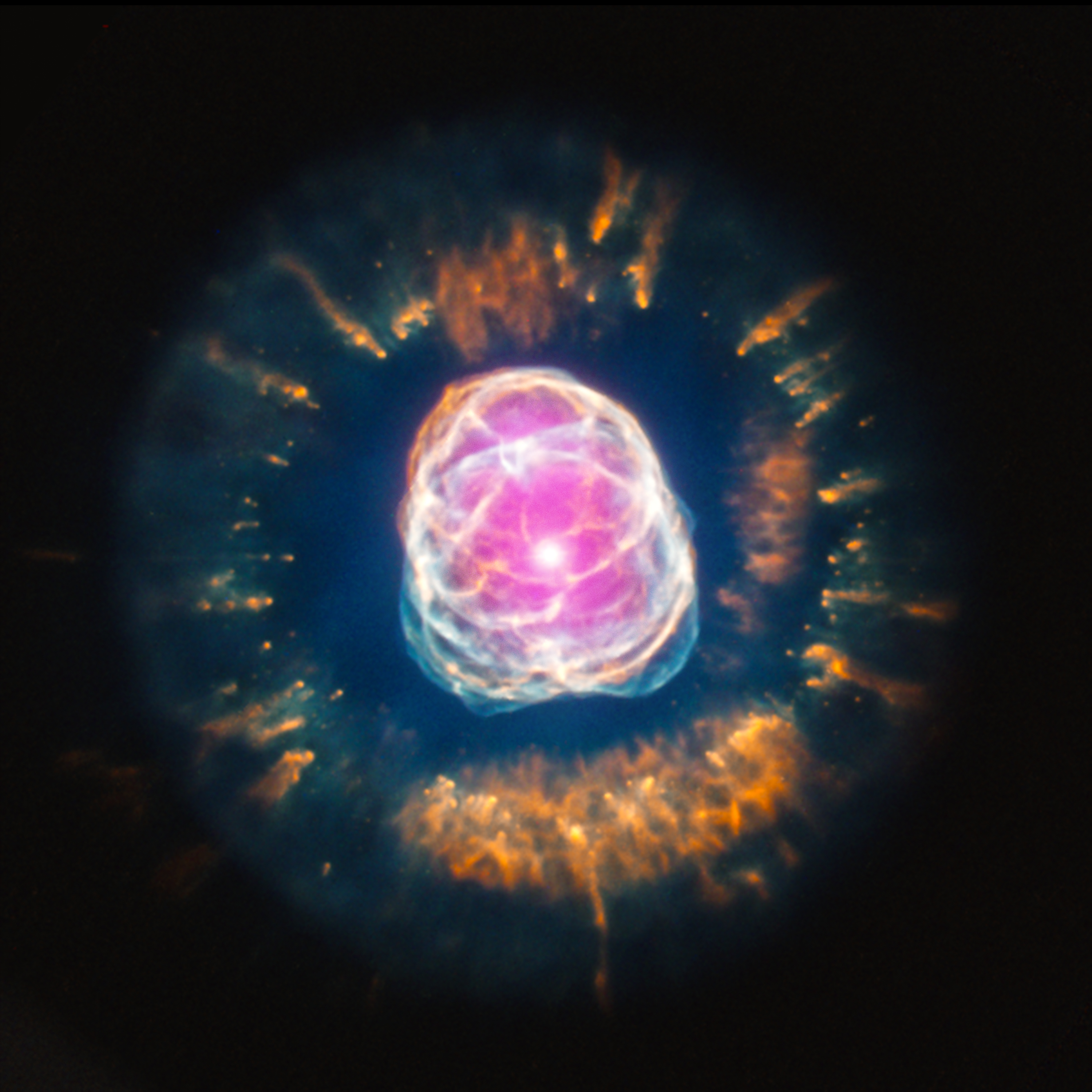
An optical (Hubble Space Telescope) and X-Ray (Chandra) composite image of NGC 2392.

== Naming controversy ==
Location of Eskimo Nebula in Gemini, just east of δ Geminorum (annotated as 2392)

On 11 August 2020, the IAU Working Group on Star Names (WGSN), NASA/IPAC Extragalactic Database (NED), and SIMBAD Astronomical Database (CDS) discontinued use of nicknames that were perceived as offensive which included "Eskimo Nebula", and strongly recommended the nebula be referred to by its NGC designation in further publications.

== See also ==
- List of planetary nebulae
- New General Catalogue

== Notes ==
1. Radius = distance × sin(angular size / 2) = ≥2900 ly * sin(48″ / 2) = ≥0.34 ly
2. 10.1 apparent magnitude – 5 * (log_{10}(≥880 pc distance) – 1) = ≤0.4 absolute magnitude
