= Sigma Geminorum =

Binary star system in the constellation Gemini

σ Geminorum
- Location of σ Geminorum (circled)

Observation data Epoch J2000.0 Equinox J2000.0 (ICRS)
- Constellation: Gemini
- Right ascension: 07^{h} 43^{m} 18.72698^{s}
- Declination: +28° 53′ 00.6422″
- Apparent magnitude (V): 4.20

Characteristics
- Spectral type: K1 III + dG/K
- U−B color index: +0.97
- B−V color index: +1.11
- Variable type: RS CVn

Astrometry
Radial velocity (R_{v})	+25.56±2.72 km/s
Proper motion (μ)	RA: +62.66 mas/yr Dec.: −230.32 mas/yr
Parallax (π)	26.08±0.19 mas
Distance	125.1 ± 0.9 ly (38.3 ± 0.3 pc)
Absolute magnitude (M_{V})	+1.36

Orbit
Period (P)	19.6027±0.0005 d
Semi-major axis (a)	4.63±0.04 mas
Eccentricity (e)	0
Inclination (i)	107.7±0.8°
Argument of periastron (ω) (secondary)	0°

Details

σ Gem A
Mass	1.28±0.07 M_{☉}
Radius	10.1±0.4 R_{☉}
Luminosity	39±2 L_{☉}
Surface gravity (log g)	2.54±0.02 cgs
Temperature	4571±5 K
Metallicity [Fe/H]	0.0 dex
Rotation	19.47 days
Rotational velocity (v sin i)	26.2 km/s
Age	5±1 Gyr

σ Gem B
Mass	0.73±0.03 M_{☉}

Other designations
- σ Gem, 75 Gem, BD+29°1590, HD 62044, HIP 37629, HR 2973, SAO 79638.

Database references
SIMBAD	data

Sigma Geminorum (σ Gem) is a binary star system in the constellation Gemini, just to the northwest of Pollux. It is visible to the naked eye with an apparent visual magnitude of 4.20. Its annual parallax shift of 26.08 mas indicates that it is located 125 light years from the Sun.

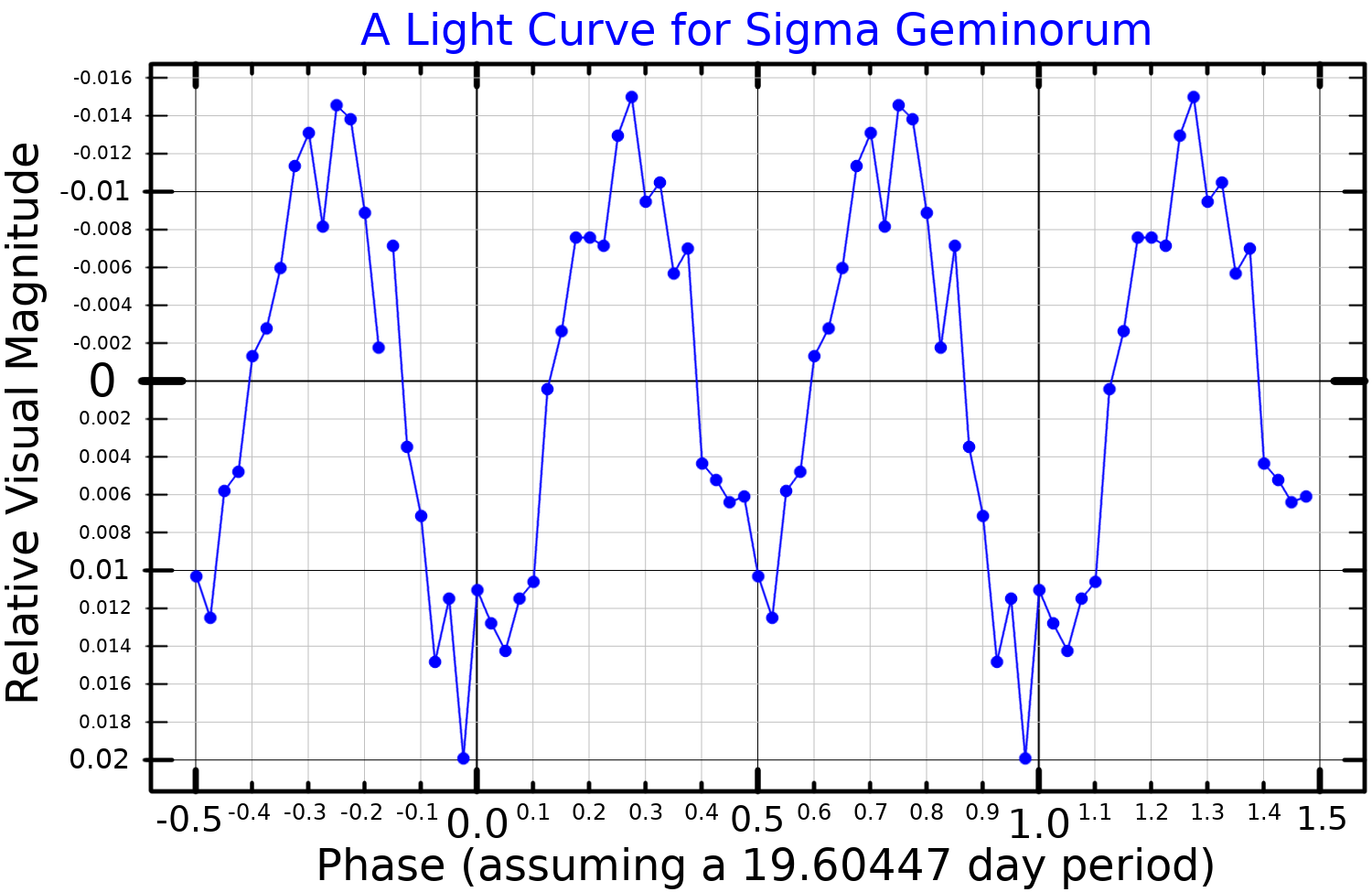
A visual band light curve for Sigma Geminorum, adapted from Kővári et al. (2015)

Sigma Geminorum is a single-lined spectroscopic binary, which means that the spectrum of only one of its components can be discerned. It is an RS Canum Venaticorum variable with a period of 19.6 days, matching the orbital period. The stellar luminosity shows indications of ellipsoidal variation, as the primary component is partly filling its Roche lobe due to gravitational interaction between the two stars.

The primary component is an evolved K-type giant star with a stellar classification of K1 III. It has a relatively high rate of spin for a giant star, showing a projected rotational velocity of 26.2 km/s and a rotation period of 19.47 days. This rate is being maintained by the tidal interaction between the two stars. The surface of the primary has large star spots that are locked onto the face oriented toward the secondary component. These spots appear to migrate poleward at an average velocity of 0.12±0.03 km/s. The surface activity makes the star a bright X-ray emission source with a luminosity of 119.41×10^{29} ergs s^{−1}. It displays indications of anti-solar differential rotation.

The primary has 1.28 times the mass of the Sun, but has expanded to 10.1 times the Sun's radius. It shines with 39 times the solar luminosity from its outer atmosphere at an effective temperature of 4571 K. It is roughly 5 billion years old.
