= NGC 2355 =

Open cluster in the constellation Gemini

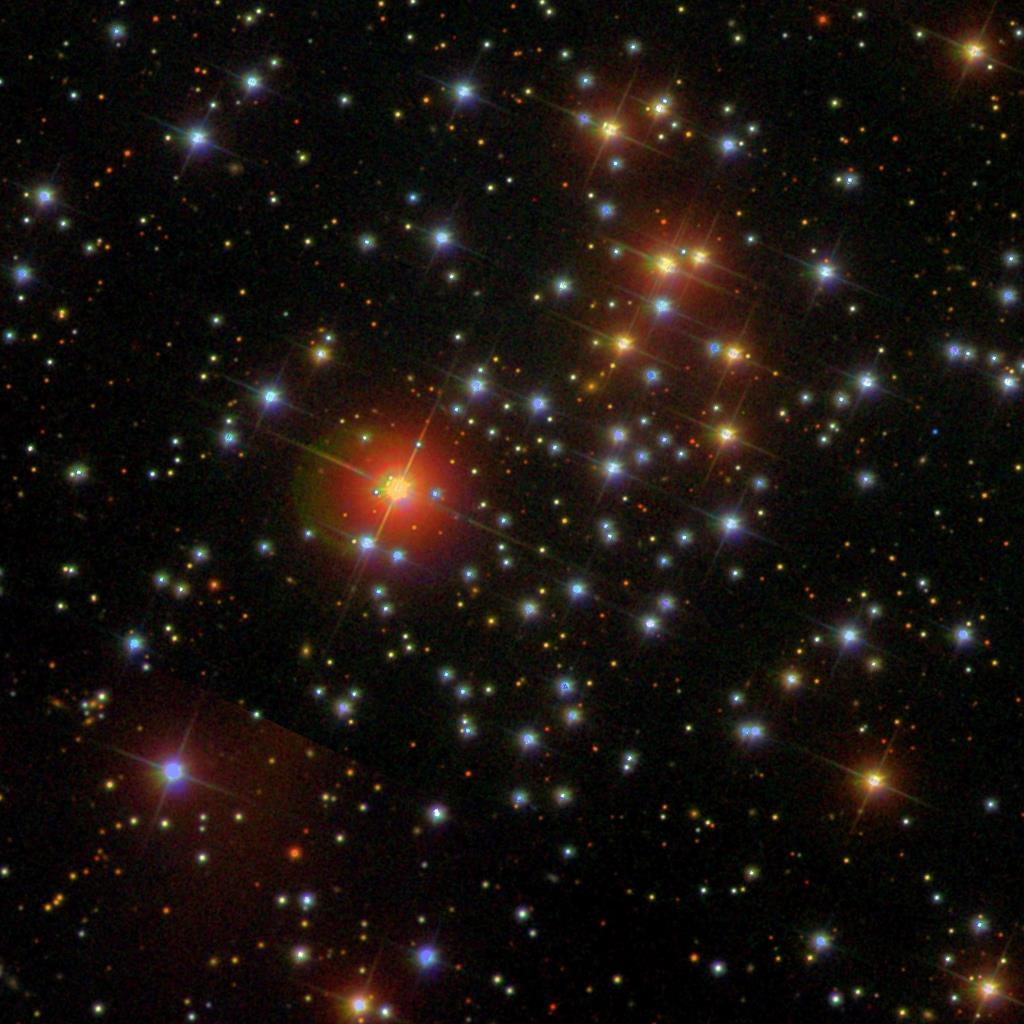
- SDSS

Observation data (J2000 epoch)
- Right ascension: 07^{h} 17.0^{m}
- Declination: +13° 47′
- Distance: 5.38 kly (1.65 kpc)
- Apparent magnitude (V): 9.7
- Apparent dimensions (V): 9′

Physical characteristics
- Other designations: Cr 133, NGC 2356

Associations
- Constellation: Gemini

NGC 2355, also known as The Jedi Knight, is an open cluster of stars in the constellation of Gemini. It is also catalogued as NGC 2356.

This cluster is approximately a billion years old and is located about 5,400 light years (ly) from the Solar System and 1,100 ly above the plane of the Milky Way galaxy. At that distance, the angular size of the cluster halo corresponds to a radius of about 23 ly. The core radius is 2.3 ly, and the central component radius is 11 ly.
