= Kappa Geminorum =

Binary star system in the constellation Gemini

κ Geminorum
- Location of κ Geminorum (circled)

Observation data Epoch J2000.0 Equinox J2000.0 (ICRS)
- Constellation: Gemini
- Right ascension: 07^{h} 44^{m} 26.85357^{s}
- Declination: +24° 23′ 52.7872″
- Apparent magnitude (V): 3.568 + 8.2

Characteristics
- Spectral type: G9 III
- U−B color index: +0.700
- B−V color index: +0.941

Astrometry
Radial velocity (R_{v})	20.6 km/s
Proper motion (μ)	RA: −23.39 mas/yr Dec.: −54.57 mas/yr
Parallax (π)	23.07±0.22 mas
Distance	141 ± 1 ly (43.3 ± 0.4 pc)
Absolute magnitude (M_{V})	+0.35

Details
Mass	2.07 M_{☉}
Radius	11.00±0.16 R_{☉}
Luminosity	69.3±3.7 L_{☉}
Surface gravity (log g)	2.8 cgs
Temperature	5,020±68 K
Metallicity [Fe/H]	−0.16 dex
Rotational velocity (v sin i)	3.3 km/s
Age	2.07 Gyr

Other designations
- κ Gem, 77 Geminorum, BD+24°1759, FK5 294, HD 62345, HIP 37740, HR 2985, SAO 79653.

Database references
SIMBAD	data

Kappa Geminorum (κ Geminorum, κ Gem) is a binary star system in the northern zodiac constellation of Gemini. It is visible to the naked eye with an apparent visual magnitude of 3.568. Based upon an annual parallax shift of 23.07 mas, the system is located about 141 light years distant from the Sun.

In Chinese astronomy, Kappa Geminorum is called 積薪, Pinyin: Jīxīn, meaning Pile of Firewood, because this star is marking itself and stand alone in Pile of Firewood asterism, Well mansion (see : Chinese constellation). 積薪 (Jīxīn) westernized into Tseih Tsing, but the name Tseih Tsing was designated for χ Gem and μ Cnc by R.H. Allen, with the meaning is "piled-up fuel" In Japanese, 隆博星 (Takahiro-boshi), meaning "Esteemed Nobility Star," refers to the Japanese description of κ Geminorum.

This is a probable astrometric binary system with the components having an angular separation of 7.2 arcseconds along a position angle of 241°, as of 2014. The primary is an evolved G-type giant star with a stellar classification of G9 III. Since 1943, the spectrum of this star has served as one of the stable anchor points by which other stars are classified. It has double the mass of the Sun, but has expanded to 11 times the solar radius. The star radiates around 69 times the Sun's luminosity from its outer atmosphere at an effective temperature of 5,020 K. It shows a leisurely spin with a projected rotational velocity of 3.3 km/s, and is around two billion years old. The secondary component is a magnitude 8.2 star.
