= Cancer Minor =

Former constellation

Cancer Minor (Latin for "lesser crab") was a constellation composed from a few stars in Gemini adjacent to Cancer. The constellation was introduced in 1612 (or 1613) by Petrus Plancius.

The 5th-magnitude stars constituting Cancer Minor were HD 59686, and 68, 74, 81 and 85 Geminorum, forming a faint natural arrow-shaped asterism.

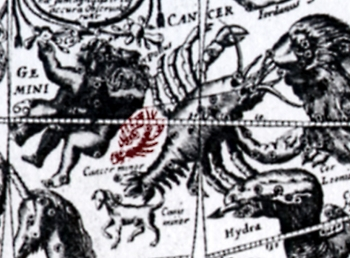
Detail from Atlas Coelestis, 1681 (Map shown in mirror image, from outside celestial sphere)

It is only found on a few 17th-century Dutch celestial globes and in the atlas of Andreas Cellarius. It is mentioned as a recent creation in the 1627 star atlas Coelum Stellatum Christianum by Julius Schiller, where it is also called Cancellus (Latin for "little crab"), but it is not depicted. It was no longer used after the 18th century.

== See also ==
- Former constellations
