= Chi Geminorum =

Star in the constellation of Gemini

χ Geminorum
- Location of χ Geminorum (circled in red)

Observation data Epoch J2000.0 Equinox J2000.0 (ICRS)
- Constellation: Gemini
- Right ascension: 08^{h} 03^{m} 31.08225^{s}
- Declination: +27° 47′ 39.6243″
- Apparent magnitude (V): 4.98

Characteristics
- Evolutionary stage: red giant branch
- Spectral type: K2 III
- U−B color index: +1.09
- B−V color index: +1.14

Astrometry
Radial velocity (R_{v})	−3.83±0.17 km/s
Proper motion (μ)	RA: −25.52 mas/yr Dec.: −31.89 mas/yr
Parallax (π)	12.73±0.90 mas
Distance	260 ± 20 ly (79 ± 6 pc)
Absolute magnitude (M_{V})	0.461

Orbit
Period (P)	2,437.8d
Eccentricity (e)	0.06
Periastron epoch (T)	2442894.5±10.0 JD
Argument of periastron (ω) (secondary)	264°
Semi-amplitude (K_{1}) (primary)	5.2 km/s

Details
Mass	1.83 M_{☉}
Radius	14 R_{☉}
Luminosity	79 L_{☉}
Surface gravity (log g)	2.5 cgs
Temperature	4,560±5 K
Metallicity [Fe/H]	0.03 dex
Rotational velocity (v sin i)	3.8 km/s
Age	1.92 Gyr

Other designations
- χ Gem, 6 Cancri, BD+28°1532, FK5 305, HD 66216, HIP 39424, HR 3149, SAO 79896

Database references
SIMBAD	data

Chi Geminorum (χ Gem) is a binary star system in the constellation Gemini, near the eastern border with Cancer. It can be viewed with the naked eye on a dark night, having an apparent visual magnitude of 4.98. Based upon an annual parallax shift of 12.73 mas, it is located roughly 260 light years from the Sun.

The two components of this system form a spectroscopic binary with an orbital period of 2,437.8 days and an eccentricity of 0.06. The primary component is a K-type giant star with a stellar classification of K2 III. This is a candidate mild Barium star with the slight overabundance most likely acquired through accretion from what is now a white dwarf companion. The primary has an estimated 1.83 times the mass of the Sun and has expanded to 14 times the Sun's radius. The effective temperature of the outer atmosphere is 4,560 K, from whence it radiates 79 times the solar luminosity. It has a leisurely projected rotational velocity of 3.8 km/s and is around two billion years old.
