= IC 444 =

Nebula in the constellation Gemini

Reflection nebula
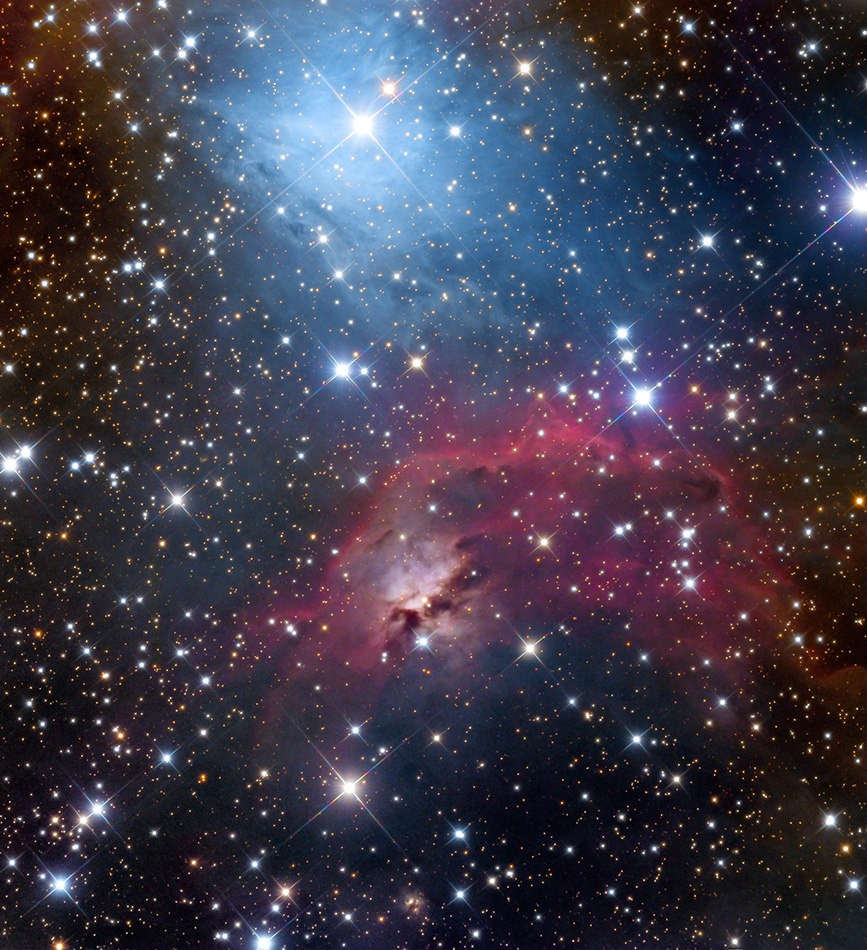

Observation data: J2000 epoch
- Right ascension: 06^{h} 18^{m} 34.0^{s}
- Declination: +23° 18′ 48″
- Apparent magnitude (V): 7.03
- Apparent dimensions (V): ~32 arcminutes dia.
- Constellation: Gemini
- Designations: IC 444, DG 100, LBN 840, Ced 74.

IC 444 is a deep-sky object in the constellation of Gemini. It is commonly identified with LBN 840, a small, 32 square arcminute reflection nebula close to the stars 10 Geminorum, 11 Geminorum and 12 Geminorum.

== Identification ==
The identity of IC 444 is uncertain. J. L. E. Dreyer included it in the first part of his Index Catalogue, Index Catalogue of Nebulae Found in the Years 1888–1894 on the basis of photographic discoveries made by the German astronomer Max Wolf and the American astronomer E. E. Barnard. But the coordinates recorded by Dreyer are RA 06° 11' 55" NPD 66° 41' for the epoch 1860, which precess to the modern J2000 coordinates RA 06° 20' 43", Dec +23° 57', a region of the sky that is devoid of nebulosity.

Dreyer's laconic description of IC 444 reads: "Neb, *9.5 inv", meaning "a nebula of magnitude 9.5, with star involved".

Over the past century various nebulae in Gemini have been identified with IC 444:

- The German astronomer Wolfgang Steinicke identified IC 444 with the nebulosity surrounding the star Mu Geminorum. This lies over a degree to the south of Dreyer's position and includes the emission nebula Sharpless 2-249.
- American astronomer Harold Glenn Corwin and NED place IC 444 at the coordinates RA 06° 21' 08" Dec +23° 06' 34.3". There is no specific nebula at this exact position, but Corwin chooses these coordinates because they represent the center of one of the extended areas of nebulosity that lie to the northeast of the better-known IC 443, the Jellyfish Nebula.
- Courtney Seligmann, a former Professor of Astronomy at Long Beach City College and currently a prominent online researcher, considers IC 444 a lost object.
- LBN 840. This remains the most popular identification of IC 444, and thanks to Adam Block's impressive photograph (see right), it will probably remain so for the foreseeable future. Courtney Seligmann, however, describes this as a "bad" identification, noting: "it is probably too small and faint for Wolf's 2 1/4 inch objective to have recorded, and in any event would never have been identified by him as a large, bright nebula."
