= Phi Geminorum =

Binary star system in the constellation Gemini

φ Geminorum
- Location of φ Geminorum (circled in red)

Observation data Epoch J2000.0 Equinox J2000.0 (ICRS)
- Constellation: Gemini
- Right ascension: 07^{h} 53^{m} 29.81390^{s}
- Declination: +26° 45′ 56.8252″
- Apparent magnitude (V): 4.95

Characteristics
- Evolutionary stage: main sequence
- Spectral type: A3 V
- U−B color index: +0.08
- B−V color index: +0.10

Astrometry
Radial velocity (R_{v})	+8.0 km/s
Proper motion (μ)	RA: −34.69 mas/yr Dec.: -30.10 mas/yr
Parallax (π)	14.66±0.73 mas
Distance	220 ± 10 ly (68 ± 3 pc)
Absolute magnitude (M_{V})	+0.81

Orbit
Period (P)	581.751 d
Eccentricity (e)	0.0

Details
Mass	1.9 M_{☉}
Luminosity	36.5 L_{☉}
Surface gravity (log g)	4.0 cgs
Temperature	8,551±291 K
Rotational velocity (v sin i)	165 km/s
Age	637 Myr

Other designations
- φ Gem, 83 Geminorum, BD+27°1499, FK5 1207, HD 64145, HIP 38538, HR 3067, SAO 79774.

Database references
SIMBAD	data

Phi Geminorum, Latinized from φ Geminorum, is a binary star in the constellation Gemini, to the southeast of Pollux. It is visible to the naked eye with an apparent visual magnitude of 4.95. Based upon an annual parallax shift of 14.66 mas, this system is located around 220 light years from the Sun.

The two components of this system have a circular orbit with a period of 582 days. The primary component is an A-type main sequence star with a stellar classification of A3 V. It is around 600 million years old and spinning relatively rapidly with a projected rotational velocity of 165 km/s. This rate of spin is giving the star an oblate shape with an equatorial bulge that is 6% larger than the polar radius. The star has nearly double the mass of the Sun and radiates 36.5 times the solar luminosity from its outer atmosphere at an effective temperature of 8,551 K.
