= 81 Geminorum =

Star in the constellation Gemini

- Location of 81 Geminorum (circled)

Observation data Epoch J2000 Equinox ICRS
- Constellation: Gemini
- Right ascension: 07^{h} 46^{m} 07.45014^{s}
- Declination: +18° 30′ 36.0217″
- Apparent magnitude (V): 4.89

Characteristics
- Spectral type: K4 III
- B−V color index: 1.425±0.034

Astrometry
Radial velocity (R_{v})	+83.13±0.08 km/s
Proper motion (μ)	RA: −79.687 mas/yr Dec.: −53.551 mas/yr
Parallax (π)	9.1500±0.2963 mas
Distance	360 ± 10 ly (109 ± 4 pc)
Absolute magnitude (M_{V})	−0.19

Orbit
Period (P)	1,519.7±1.7 d
Semi-major axis (a)	≥ 142±3 Gm
Eccentricity (e)	0.325±0.015
Periastron epoch (T)	41,584±11 MJD
Argument of periastron (ω) (secondary)	73±3°
Semi-amplitude (K_{1}) (primary)	7.21±0.13 km/s

Details

81 Gem A
Mass	1.22 M_{☉}
Radius	33.7+2.0 −1.7 R_{☉}
Luminosity	287.3±10.5 L_{☉}
Surface gravity (log g)	1.94 cgs
Temperature	4,095+109 −115 K
Metallicity [Fe/H]	−0.18±0.06 dex
Age	6.32 Gyr

Other designations
- g Gem, 81 Gem, BD+18°1733, FK5 1200, GC 10456, HD 62721, HIP 37908, HR 3003, SAO 97221, WDS J07461+1831AB

Database references
SIMBAD	data

81 Geminorum is a binary star system in the northern constellation of Gemini. It has the Bayer designation g Geminorum, while 81 Geminorum is its Flamsteed designation. This system is visible to the naked eye as a faint, orange-hued point of light with an apparent visual magnitude of 4.89. The pair are located approximately 360 light years away from the Sun, based on parallax, and are moving further away with a radial velocity of +83 km/s, having come to within an estimated 164 light-years of the Earth nearly a million years ago. 81 Geminorum lies close enough to the ecliptic to undergo lunar occultations.

The variable velocity of this system was first suspected at the Dominion Astrophysical Observatory in 1921, then confirmed by the Lick Observatory in 1922. It is a single-lined spectroscopic binary with an orbital period of 4.2 years and an eccentricity of 0.325. The visible component is an aging giant star with a stellar classification of K4 III, having exhausted the supply of hydrogen at its core then expanded to 34 times the Sun's radius. It is over six billion years old with 1.22 times the mass of the Sun. This is a candidate alpha-enhanced star that displays a significant overabundance of silicon. The star is radiating around 287 times the Sun's luminosity from its bloated photosphere at an effective temperature of 4,095 K.
