= 85 Geminorum =

A-type main-sequence star in constellation Gemini

Observation data Epoch J2000.0 Equinox ICRS
- Constellation: Gemini
- Right ascension: 07^{h} 55^{m} 39.89^{s}
- Declination: +19° 53′ 02.3″
- Apparent magnitude (V): 5.365±0.009

Characteristics
- Evolutionary stage: main-sequence
- Spectral type: A0Vs

Astrometry
Radial velocity (R_{v})	12.3 km/s
Proper motion (μ)	RA: -15.114 mas/yr Dec.: -39.83 mas/yr
Parallax (π)	6.4022±0.1333 mas
Distance	510 ± 10 ly (156 ± 3 pc)

Details
Mass	3.29 M_{☉}

Other designations
- 85 Gem, BD+20 1946, HD 64648, HIP 38722, HR 3086, SAO 79799, GCRV 5268, 2MASS J07553990+1953024, Gaia DR3 670326064263850624

Database references
SIMBAD	data

85 Geminorum (85 Gem) is an A-type main-sequence star located approximately 510 light-years from Earth in the constellation of Gemini. It is a relatively bright star with an apparent visual magnitude of approximately 5.37, making it visible to the naked eye under dark skies.

== Observation ==
In 2005, 85 Geminorum was observed by NASA Infrared Telescope Facility and has served as an A0V spectrophotometric standard star in infrared spectroscopy to calibrate spectra of M, L, and T dwarf stars.

In a 2022 survey of visual binaries among intermediate-mass stars, 85 Geminorum was included with an estimated mass of approximately 3.29 M_{☉}, placing it in the A-type stars mass range. Although, no companion stars have been detected.
