= 38 Geminorum =

Quadruple star system in the constellation Gemini

- Location of 38 Cassiopeiae (circled in red)

Observation data Epoch J2000 Equinox ICRS
- Constellation: Gemini
- A
- Right ascension: 06^{h} 54^{m} 38.63815^{s}
- Declination: +13° 10′ 40.2431″
- Apparent magnitude (V): 4.75
- B
- Right ascension: 06^{h} 54^{m} 38.92062^{s}
- Declination: +13° 10′ 34.1871″
- Apparent magnitude (V): 7.80
- UPM J0654+1310
- Right ascension: 06^{h} 54^{m} 48.77255^{s}
- Declination: +13° 10′ 03.4482″
- Apparent magnitude (V): 15.1

Characteristics

A
- Evolutionary stage: main sequence (Aa)
- Spectral type: F0V + F7/8V
- U−B color index: +0.07
- B−V color index: +0.30
- Variable type: Suspected δ Sct

B
- Evolutionary stage: main sequence
- Spectral type: G6V

UPM J0654+1310
- Evolutionary stage: main sequence
- Spectral type: dMp3.5

Astrometry

A
Radial velocity (R_{v})	+30.46±0.09 km/s
Proper motion (μ)	RA: +68.745 mas/yr Dec.: −86.832 mas/yr
Parallax (π)	33.9184±0.8248 mas
Distance	96 ± 2 ly (29.5 ± 0.7 pc)
Absolute magnitude (M_{V})	+2.50

B
Radial velocity (R_{v})	+22.6±2 km/s
Proper motion (μ)	RA: +89.385 mas/yr Dec.: −76.967 mas/yr
Parallax (π)	33.3248±0.0384 mas
Distance	97.9 ± 0.1 ly (30.01 ± 0.03 pc)

UPM J0654+1310
Radial velocity (R_{v})	+25.59±3.25 km/s
Proper motion (μ)	RA: +71.706 mas/yr Dec.: −85.515 mas/yr
Parallax (π)	33.2912±0.0248 mas
Distance	97.97 ± 0.07 ly (30.04 ± 0.02 pc)

Orbit
Primary	38 Gem Aa
Name	38 Gem Ab
Period (P)	174.7±0.1 days
Semi-major axis (a)	0.85–0.90 au (Note: Based on a sin i value of 0.67 au and orbital inclinations between 48 and 52°, using the formula a = a sin i / sin(i).)
Eccentricity (e)	0.24±0.02
Inclination (i)	48–52°
Periastron epoch (T)	59418.3±0.1 HJD
Argument of periastron (ω) (secondary)	258±3°
Semi-amplitude (K_{1}) (primary)	17.3±0.5 km/s
Semi-amplitude (K_{2}) (secondary)	25.4±0.5 km/s

Details

38 Gem Aa
Mass	1.61+0.06 −0.05 M_{☉}
Radius	1.97 R_{☉}
Luminosity	7.9+1.0 −0.8 L_{☉}
Surface gravity (log g)	4.0±0.5 cgs
Temperature	7,500±250 K
Metallicity [Fe/H]	−0.08±0.06 dex
Rotational velocity (v sin i)	150±20 km/s
Age	993+220 −190 Myr

38 Gem Ab
Mass	1.12+0.23 −0.10 M_{☉}
Radius	1.16 R_{☉}
Luminosity	1.07+1.38 −0.63 L_{☉}
Surface gravity (log g)	4.0±0.5 cgs
Temperature	6,000±250 K
Rotational velocity (v sin i)	5±1 km/s
Age	993+220 −190 Myr

38 Gem B
Mass	0.89 M_{☉}
Radius	0.88 R_{☉}
Luminosity	0.69 L_{☉}
Surface gravity (log g)	4.55 cgs
Temperature	5,614 K
Age	993+220 −190 Myr

UPM J0654+1310
Mass	0.25 M_{☉}
Radius	0.25 R_{☉}
Luminosity	0.0062 L_{☉}
Surface gravity (log g)	4.99 cgs
Temperature	3,261 K
Age	993+220 −190 Myr

Other designations
- e Gem, 38 Gem, NSV 3266, BD+13°1462, GJ 9220, HD 50635, HIP 33202, HR 2564, SAO 96265, WDS J06546+1311

Database references
SIMBAD	data
- B
- UPM J0654+1310

38 Geminorum is a quadruple star system in the northern zodiac constellation of Gemini. It has the Bayer designation e Geminorum, while 38 Geminorum is the Flamsteed designation. This system is visible to the naked eye as a faint, white-hued point of light with an apparent visual magnitude of 4.71. The system is located about 98 light years away from the Sun based on parallax, and is drifting further away with a radial velocity of +16 km/s. It is a potential member of the Tucana–Horologium stellar kinematic group.

== Characteristics ==
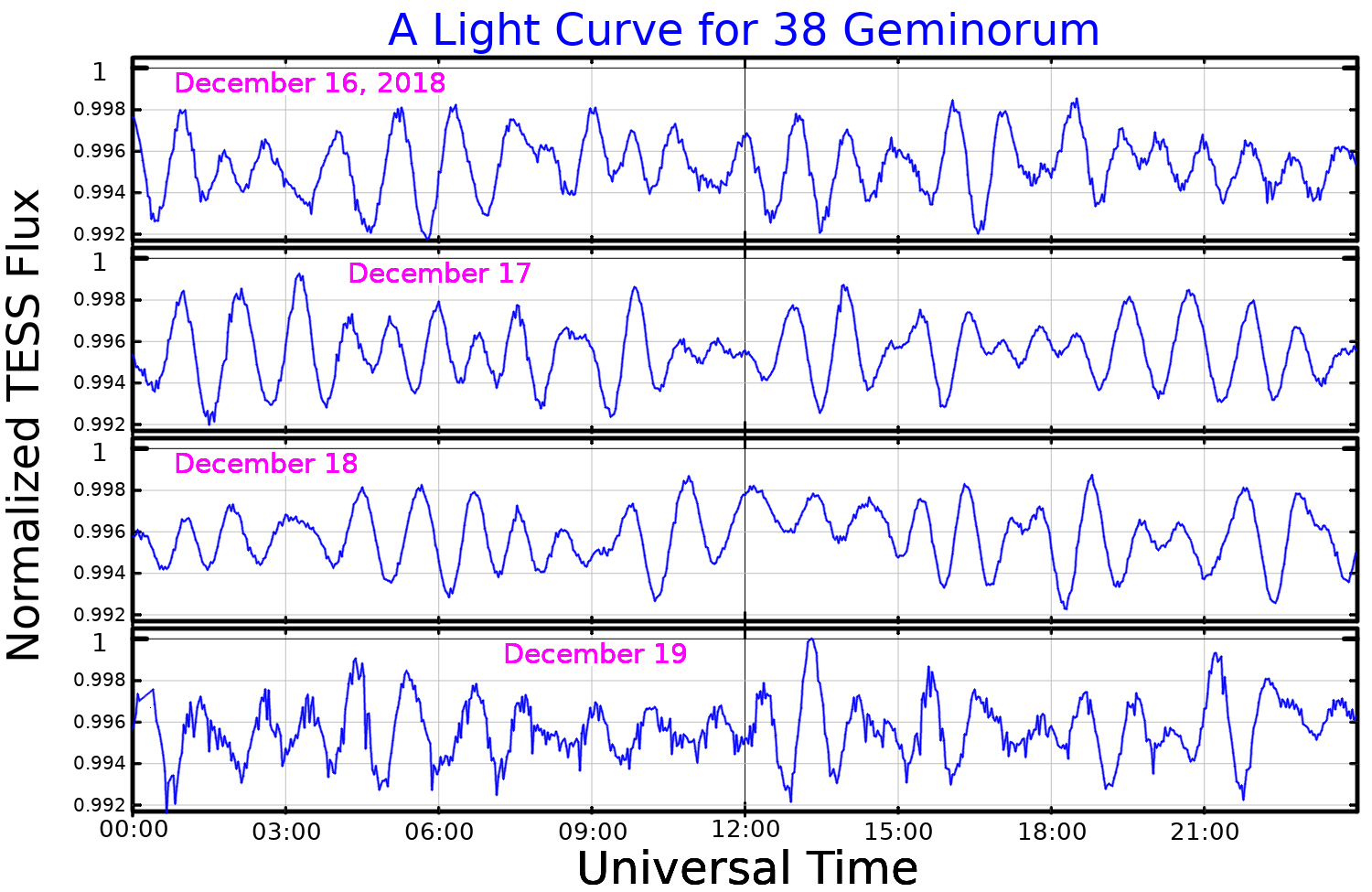
Light curve for 38 Geminorum plotted from TESS data

The primary component, e Geminorum Aa, is an F-type main-sequence star which has about 1.61 times the mass of the Sun, 1.97 times the radius of the Sun and an effective temperature of 7,500 K. It is a suspected chemically peculiar star of subtype CP1 (an Am star), which Slettebak (1955) classified as kA8mF0Vp. This notation indicates the star displays the calcium K line of an A8 star and the metal lines of an F0V star. In 1949, J. Hopmann catalogued it as a suspected Delta Scuti variable.

The primary is closely orbited by companion e Geminorum Ab, which is a smaller F-type main-sequence star with 1.12 times the radius of the Sun and a temperature of 6,000 K. It can explain the X-ray emission coming from the system. The system has been resolved using interferometry, which obtained an projected separation of 0.44 astronomical units (66,000,000 km). Combined with the masses, this results in an estimated orbital period of about two months. An orbital solution was provided in 2026, yielding an orbital period of 174.7 days, a semi-major axis of 0.85–0.90 astronomical units (127,000,000–135,000,000 km), an inclination between 48 and 52° and a low eccentricity of 0.24.

The Aa-Ab system is orbited by the component B, which has a projected separation of 184.3 AU. Two sets of low quality orbital elements have been computed for this system, yielding periods of 1,943.8 years and 3,190 years, and eccentricities of 0.150 and 0.485, respectively. As of 2018, the pair had an angular separation of 7.4″ (implying a projected separation of 220 au) along a position angle of 143°. Star B is a G-type main-sequence star with a class of G6V, 0.95 times the Sun's mass, 0.88 times the Sun's radius and an estimated effective temperature of 5,614 K.

The most distant component, UPM J0654+1310, has a projected separation of 4,560 au and is believed to be a red dwarf with a mass of just 0.3 M_{☉}.
