= Upsilon Geminorum =

Evolved red giant star in the constellation Gemini

υ Geminorum
- Location of υ Geminorum (circled in red)

Observation data Epoch J2000.0 Equinox J2000.0 (ICRS)
- Constellation: Gemini
- Right ascension: 07^{h} 35^{m} 55.35001^{s}
- Declination: +26° 53′ 44.6802″
- Apparent magnitude (V): 4.04 (4.04 - 4.08)

Characteristics
- Spectral type: M0 III
- U−B color index: +1.96
- B−V color index: +1.54
- Variable type: suspected

Astrometry
Radial velocity (R_{v})	−21.61±0.19 km/s
Proper motion (μ)	RA: −32.841 mas/yr Dec.: −106.002 mas/yr
Parallax (π)	12.8761±0.2288 mas
Distance	253 ± 5 ly (78 ± 1 pc)
Absolute magnitude (M_{V})	−0.53

Details
Mass	1.52 M_{☉}
Radius	39.62+0.74 −0.76 R_{☉}
Luminosity	369.6±18.5 L_{☉}
Surface gravity (log g)	1.0 cgs
Temperature	4,019±38 K
Metallicity [Fe/H]	0.17 dex
Rotational velocity (v sin i)	5.9 km/s
Age	3.53 Gyr

Other designations
- υ Gem, 69 Geminorum, BD+27°1424, FK5 1196, HD 60522, HIP 36962, HR 2905, SAO 79533.

Database references
SIMBAD	data

Upsilon Geminorum, Latinized from υ Geminorum, is a star in the constellation Gemini. It has an apparent visual magnitude of 4.04, which is bright enough to be seen with the naked eye. Based upon an annual parallax shift of 12.88 mas, it is around 253 light years from the Sun. There is a visual companion: a magnitude 13.20 star located at an angular separation of 55.20″ along a position angle of 40°, as of 2008.

This is an evolved red giant star with a stellar classification of M0 III. It is estimated to have 1.52 times the mass of the Sun, but has expanded to 40 times the Sun's radius. The star is spinning with a projected rotational velocity of 5.9 km/s and is about 3.53 billion years old. Upsilon Geminorum is radiating 370 times the solar luminosity from its outer atmosphere at an effective temperature of 4,019 K.

Based upon the motion of this star through space, Upsilon Geminorum is a member of the Wolf 630 moving group. This is a set of stars centered on Wolf 630 that are moving nearly in parallel and have an age of around 2.7±0.5 billion years. They may be former members of a dissolved open cluster.
