= Tau Geminorum =

Star in the constellation Gemini

τ Geminorum
- Location of τ Geminorum (circled in red)

Observation data Epoch J2000.0 Equinox ICRS
- Constellation: Gemini
- Right ascension: 07^{h} 11^{m} 08.3703^{s}
- Declination: +30° 14′ 42.590″
- Apparent magnitude (V): +4.42

Characteristics
- Evolutionary stage: red giant branch
- Spectral type: K2 III
- U−B color index: +1.41
- B−V color index: +1.261

Astrometry
Radial velocity (R_{v})	+22.02±0.07 km/s
Proper motion (μ)	RA: −30.725(167) mas/yr Dec.: −48.515(166) mas/yr
Parallax (π)	8.3261±0.1591 mas
Distance	392 ± 7 ly (120 ± 2 pc)
Absolute magnitude (M_{V})	−0.56±0.05

Details
Mass	2.3±0.3 M_{☉}
Radius	30.27+1.08 −1.09 R_{☉}
Luminosity	364±14 L_{☉}
Surface gravity (log g)	1.96±0.08 cgs
Temperature	4,583±70 K
Metallicity [Fe/H]	0.14±0.10 dex
Rotational velocity (v sin i)	5.8 km/s
Age	1.22±0.76 Gyr

Other designations
- τ Gem, 46 Gem, BD+30 1439, HD 54719, HIP 34693, HR 2697, SAO 59858

Database references
SIMBAD	data

Tau Geminorum, Latinized from τ Geminorum, is a star in the northern zodiac constellation of Gemini. It has the apparent visual magnitude of +4.42, making it visible to the naked eye under suitably good seeing conditions. This star is close enough to the Earth that its distance can be measured using the parallax technique, which yields a value of roughly 392 light-years (120 parsecs).

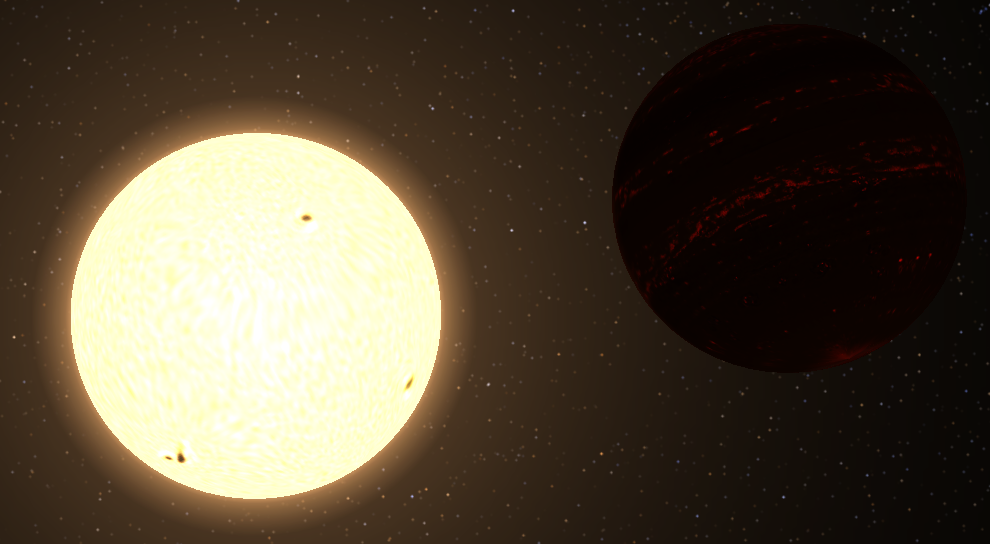
Artist's illustration of the giant star Tau Geminorum (left) and its brown dwarf companion—the dark disk at right.

It is an evolved giant star of the spectral type K2 III. It has double the mass of the Sun and has expanded to 30 times the Sun's radius. Tau Geminorum is radiating 364 times as much radiation as the Sun from its expanded outer atmosphere at an effective temperature of 4,583 K, giving it the characteristic orange-hued glow of a K-type star. It appears to be rotating slowly with a projected rotational velocity of 5.8 km/s.

== Substellar companion ==
This star has a brown dwarf companion designated Tau Geminorum b, whose mass is at least 20.6 Jupiter masses. It was discovered in 2004 by Mitchell and colleagues, who also discovered Nu Ophiuchi b at the same time. This brown dwarf takes 305 days (0.84 years) to revolve around Tau Gem. It may also have a stellar companion; a magnitude 11, K0 dwarf at a projected separation of about 187 AU.

The Tau Geminorum system
Companion (in order from star)	Mass	Semimajor axis (AU)	Orbital period (days)	Eccentricity	Inclination	Radius
b	≥20.6 M_{J}	1.17	305.5±0.1	0.031±0.009	–	–
