= Theta Geminorum =

Star in the constellation Gemini

θ Geminorum
- Location of θ Geminorum (circled in red)

Observation data Epoch J2000.0 Equinox J2000.0 (ICRS)
- Constellation: Gemini
- Right ascension: 06^{h} 52^{m} 47.33887^{s}
- Declination: +33° 57′ 40.5175″
- Apparent magnitude (V): 3.59

Characteristics
- Spectral type: A2 IV
- U−B color index: +0.13
- B−V color index: +0.10

Astrometry
Radial velocity (R_{v})	+21 km/s
Proper motion (μ)	RA: −1.66 mas/yr Dec.: −47.31 mas/yr
Parallax (π)	17.25±0.19 mas
Distance	189 ± 2 ly (58.0 ± 0.6 pc)
Absolute magnitude (M_{V})	−0.18

Details
Mass	1.80 M_{☉}
Radius	5.1 R_{☉}
Luminosity	93 L_{☉}
Surface gravity (log g)	3.40±0.14 cgs
Temperature	8,502±289 K
Rotational velocity (v sin i)	133 km/s
Age	252 Myr

Other designations
- θ Gem, The Gem, 34 Gem, BD+34°1481, FK5 261, HD 50019, HIP 33018, HR 2540, SAO 59570.

Database references
SIMBAD	data

Theta Geminorum (θ Gem, θ Geminorum) is a single star in the northern zodiac constellation of Gemini. It is visual to the naked eye with an apparent visual magnitude of 3.59. Based upon an annual parallax shift of 17.25 mas, it is about 189 light years distant from the Sun.

This is an evolving A-type subgiant star with a stellar classification of A2 IV. It has 1.80 times the mass of the Sun and radiates 93 times the solar luminosity. The measured angular diameter is 0.82±0.03 mas. At an estimated distance of this star, this yields a physical size of about 5.1 times the radius of the Sun. It is around 252 million years old and has a projected rotational velocity of 133 km/s. This rotation rate is giving the star an oblate shape, with an equatorial bulge that is 11% larger than the polar radius.

The Washington Visual Double Star Catalog lists five visual companions within 100″; the closest and brightest such companion is the magnitude 8.6 θ Geminorum E at an angular separation of 2.4″ along a position angle of 295°, as of 2010.
