= Gemini (constellation) =

Zodiac constellation in the northern hemisphere

- Constellation
- List of stars in Gemini
- Abbreviation: Gem
- Genitive: Geminorum
- Pronunciation: /ˈdʒɛmɪˌnaɪ/ JEM-ih-ny genitive /ˌdʒɛmɪˈnɔːrəm/ JEM-ih-NOR-əm
- Symbolism: the Twins, Castor and Pollux
- Right ascension: 7^{h}
- Declination: +20°
- Quadrant: NQ2
- Area: 514 sq. deg. (30th)
- Main stars: 8, 17
- Bayer/Flamsteed stars: 80
- Stars brighter than 3.00^{m}: 4
- Stars within 10.00 pc (32.62 ly): 4
- Brightest star: Pollux (β Gem) (1.15^{m})
- Nearest star: Gliese 251
- Messier objects: 1
- Meteor showers: Geminids; Rho Geminids
- Bordering constellations: Lynx; Auriga; Taurus; Orion; Monoceros; Canis Minor; Cancer
- Visible at latitudes between +90° and −55°. Best visible at 21:00 (9 p.m.) during the month of February.

Gemini is one of the constellations of the zodiac and is located in the northern celestial hemisphere. It was one of the 48 constellations described by the 2nd-century AD astronomer Ptolemy, and is one of the 88 modern constellations. Its name is Latin for twins, and it is associated with the twins Castor and Pollux in Greek mythology. Its old astronomical symbol is (♊︎).

== Characteristics ==
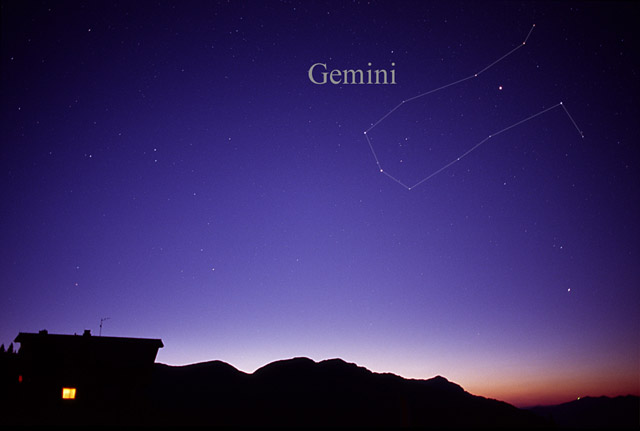
The constellation Gemini as it can be seen with the unaided eye, with added connecting lines

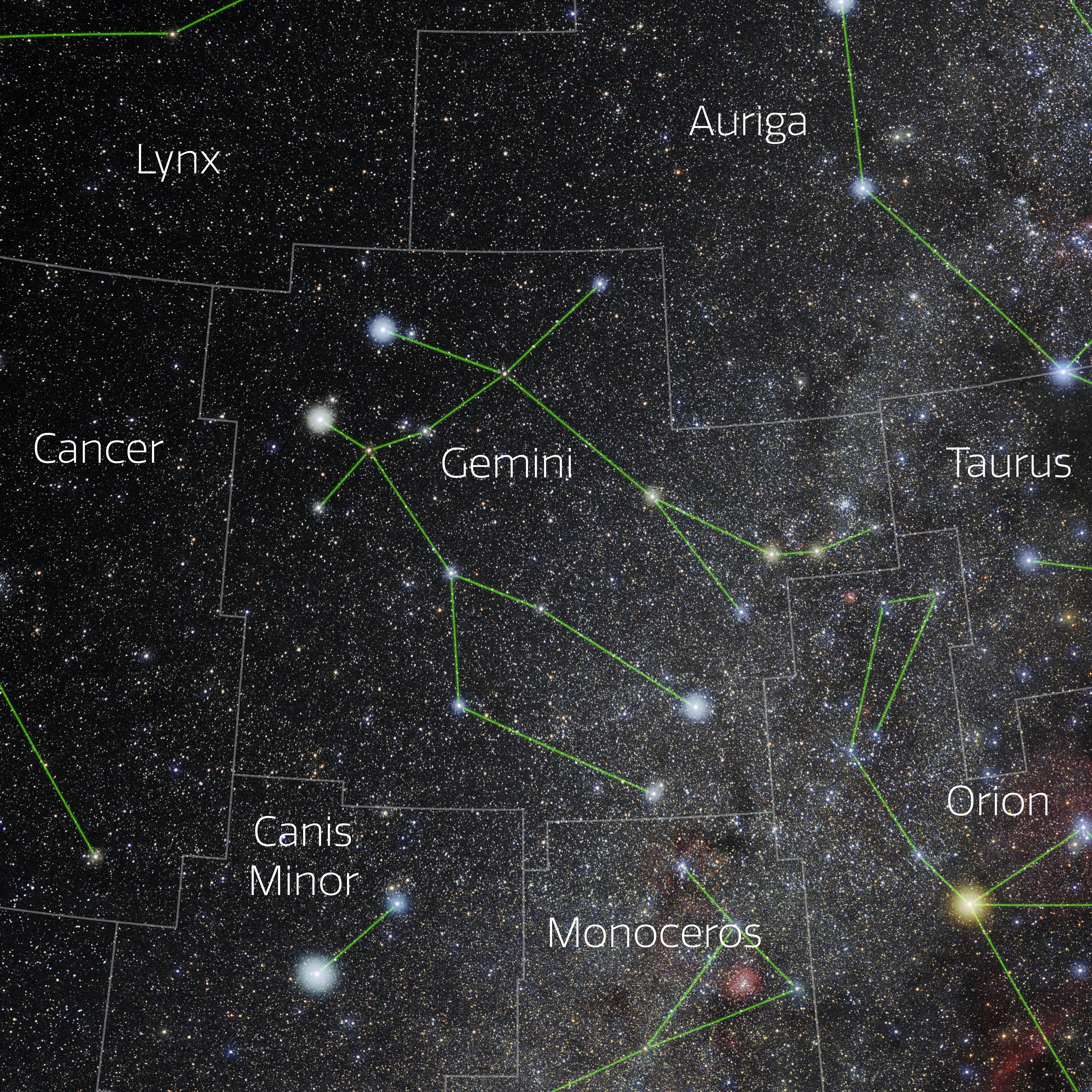
The constellation Gemini showing the IAU boundaries, the constellation stick figure, and labels for its brightest stars. Astrophotograph by Eckhard Slawik, from NOIRLab's 88 Constellations project.

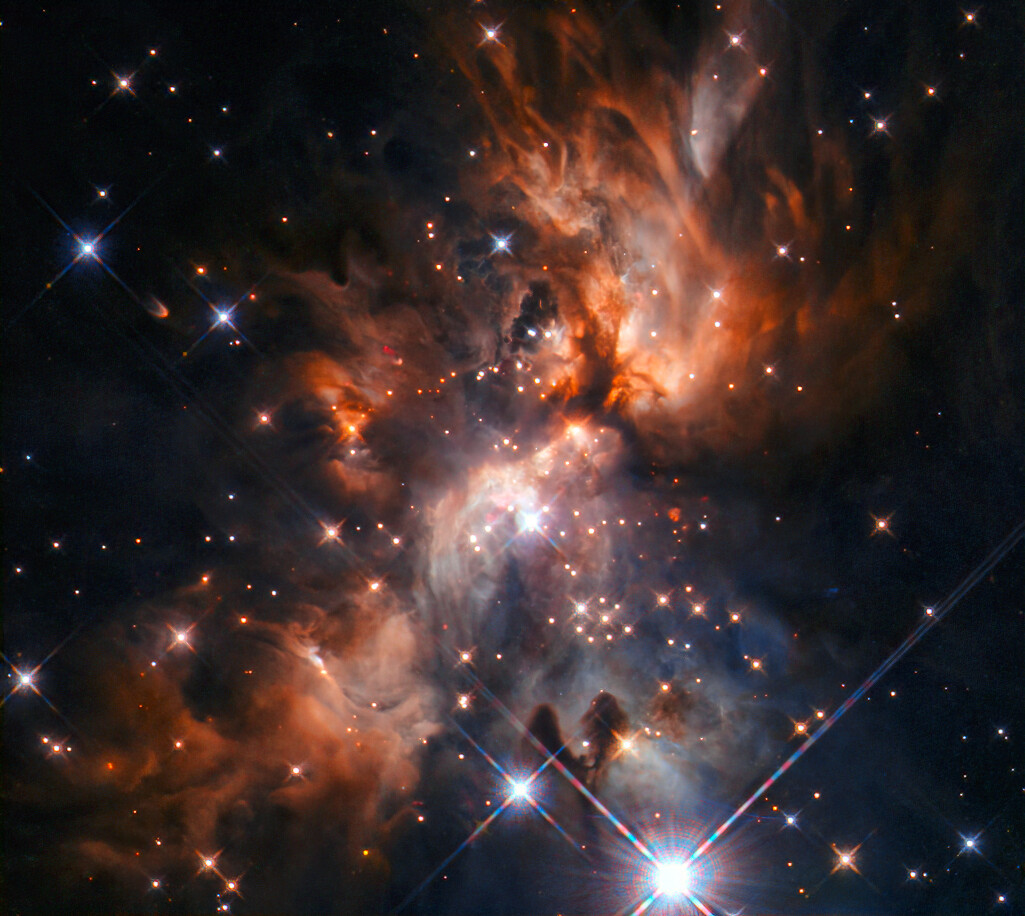
AFGL 5180 - Through the Clouds.

An animation of the constellation Gemini (center), "the twins", shows two parallel stick figures. Gemini is associated with the myth of Castor and Polydeuces (also known as Pollux), collectively known as the Dioscuri.

Gemini lies between Taurus to the west and Cancer to the east, with Auriga and Lynx to the north, Monoceros and Canis Minor to the south, and Orion to the south-west.

In classical antiquity, Cancer was the location of the Sun on the northern solstice (June 21). During the first century AD, axial precession shifted it into Gemini. In 1990, the location of the Sun at the northern solstice moved from Gemini into Taurus, where it will remain until the 27th century AD and then move into Aries. The Sun will move through Gemini from June 21 to July 20 through 2062.

Gemini is prominent in the winter skies of the northern Hemisphere and is visible the entire night in December–January. The easiest way to locate the constellation is to find its two brightest stars Castor and Pollux eastward from the familiar V-shaped asterism (the open cluster Hyades) of Taurus and the three stars of Orion's Belt (Alnitak, Alnilam, and Mintaka). Another way is to mentally draw a line from the Pleiades star cluster located in Taurus and the brightest star in Leo, Regulus. In doing so, an imaginary line that is relatively close to the ecliptic is drawn, a line which intersects Gemini roughly at the midpoint of the constellation, just below Castor and Pollux.

When the Moon moves through Gemini, its motion can easily be observed in a single night as it appears first west of Castor and Pollux, then aligns, and finally appears east of them.

== Features ==
=== Stars ===
Bayer gave the most prominent stars Bayer designations Alpha through Omega and the Latin letters A through g. Later designated two stars as b. Psi Geminorum was dropped after moving it into Cancer in 1930; however, Flamsteed used Psi^{3} Cancri on this star, leading into confusion.

The constellation contains 85 stars of naked eye visibility. The brightest star in Gemini is Pollux, and the second-brightest is Castor. Castor's Bayer designation as "Alpha" arose because Johann Bayer did not carefully distinguish which of the two was the brighter when he assigned his eponymous designations in 1603. Although the characters of myth are twins, the actual stars are physically very different from each other.

α Gem (Castor) is a sextuple star system 52 light-years from Earth, which appears as a magnitude 1.6 blue-white star to the unaided eye. Two spectroscopic binaries are visible at magnitudes 1.9 and 3.0 with a period of 470 years. A wide-set red dwarf star is also a part of the system; this star is an Algol-type eclipsing binary star with a period of 19.5 hours; its minimum magnitude is 9.8 and its maximum magnitude is 9.3.

β Gem (Pollux) is an orange-hued giant star of magnitude 1.14, 34 light-years from Earth. Pollux has an extrasolar planet revolving around it, as do two other stars in Gemini, HD 50554, and HD 59686.

γ Gem (Alhena) is a blue-white hued star of magnitude 1.9, 105 light-years from Earth.

δ Gem (Wasat) is a long-period binary star 59 light-years from Earth. The primary is a white star of magnitude 3.5, and the secondary is an orange dwarf star of magnitude 8.2. The period is over 1000 years; it is divisible in medium amateur telescopes.

ε Gem (Mebsuta), a double star, includes a primary yellow supergiant of magnitude 3.1, nine hundred light-years from Earth. The optical companion, of magnitude 9.6, is visible in binoculars and small telescopes.

ζ Gem (Mekbuda) is a double star, whose primary is a Cepheid variable star with a period of 10.2 days; its minimum magnitude is 4.2 and its maximum magnitude is 3.6. It is a yellow supergiant, 1,200 light-years from Earth, with a radius that is 60 times solar, making it approximately 220,000 times the size of the Sun. The companion, a magnitude 7.6 star, is visible in binoculars and small amateur telescopes.

η Gem (Propus) is a binary star with a variable component. 380 light-years away, it has a period of 500 years and is only divisible in large amateur telescopes. The primary is a semi-regular red giant with a period of 233 days; its minimum magnitude is 3.9 and its maximum magnitude is 3.1. The secondary is of magnitude 6.

κ Gem is a binary star 143 light-years from Earth. The primary is a yellow giant of magnitude 3.6; the secondary is of magnitude 8. The two are only divisible in larger amateur instruments because of the discrepancy in brightness.

μ Gem (Tejat) is a red giant 230 light-years from Earth, about a hundred times larger than the Sun.

ν Gem is a double star divisible in binoculars and small amateur telescopes. The primary is a blue giant of magnitude 4.1, 550 light-years from Earth, and the secondary is of magnitude 8.

38 Gem, a binary star, is also divisible in small amateur telescopes, 84 light-years from Earth. The primary is a white star of magnitude 4.8 and the secondary is a yellow star of magnitude 7.8.

U Gem is a dwarf nova type cataclysmic variable discovered by J. R. Hind in 1855.

=== Deep-sky objects ===
Deep sky objects
Messier 35 and NGC 2158
Medusa Nebula	NGC 2392	Medusa Nebula

M35 (NGC 2168) is a large, elongated open cluster of magnitude 5, discovered in the year 1745 by Swiss astronomer Philippe Loys de Chéseaux. It has an area of approximately 0.2 square degrees, the same size as the full moon. Its high magnitude means that M35 is visible to the unaided eye under dark skies; under brighter skies it is discernible in binoculars. The 200 stars of M35 are arranged in chains that curve throughout the cluster; it is 2800 light-years from Earth. Another open cluster in Gemini is NGC 2158. Visible in large amateur telescopes and very rich, it is more than 12,000 light-years from Earth.

NGC 2392 is a planetary nebula with an overall magnitude of 9.2, located 4,000 light-years from Earth. In a small amateur telescope, its 10th magnitude central star is visible, along with its blue-green elliptical disk. It is said to resemble the head of a person wearing a parka.

The Medusa Nebula is another planetary nebula, some 1,500 light-years distant. Geminga is a neutron star approximately 550 light-years from Earth. Other objects include NGC 2129, NGC 2158, NGC 2266, NGC 2331 and NGC 2355.

=== Meteor showers ===
The Geminids is a bright meteor shower that peaks on December 13–14. It has a maximum rate of approximately 100 meteors per hour, making it one of the richest meteor showers. The Epsilon Geminids peak between October 18 and October 29 and have only been recently confirmed. They overlap with the Orionids, which make the Epsilon Geminids difficult to detect visually. Epsilon Geminid meteors have a higher velocity than Orionids.

== Mythology ==
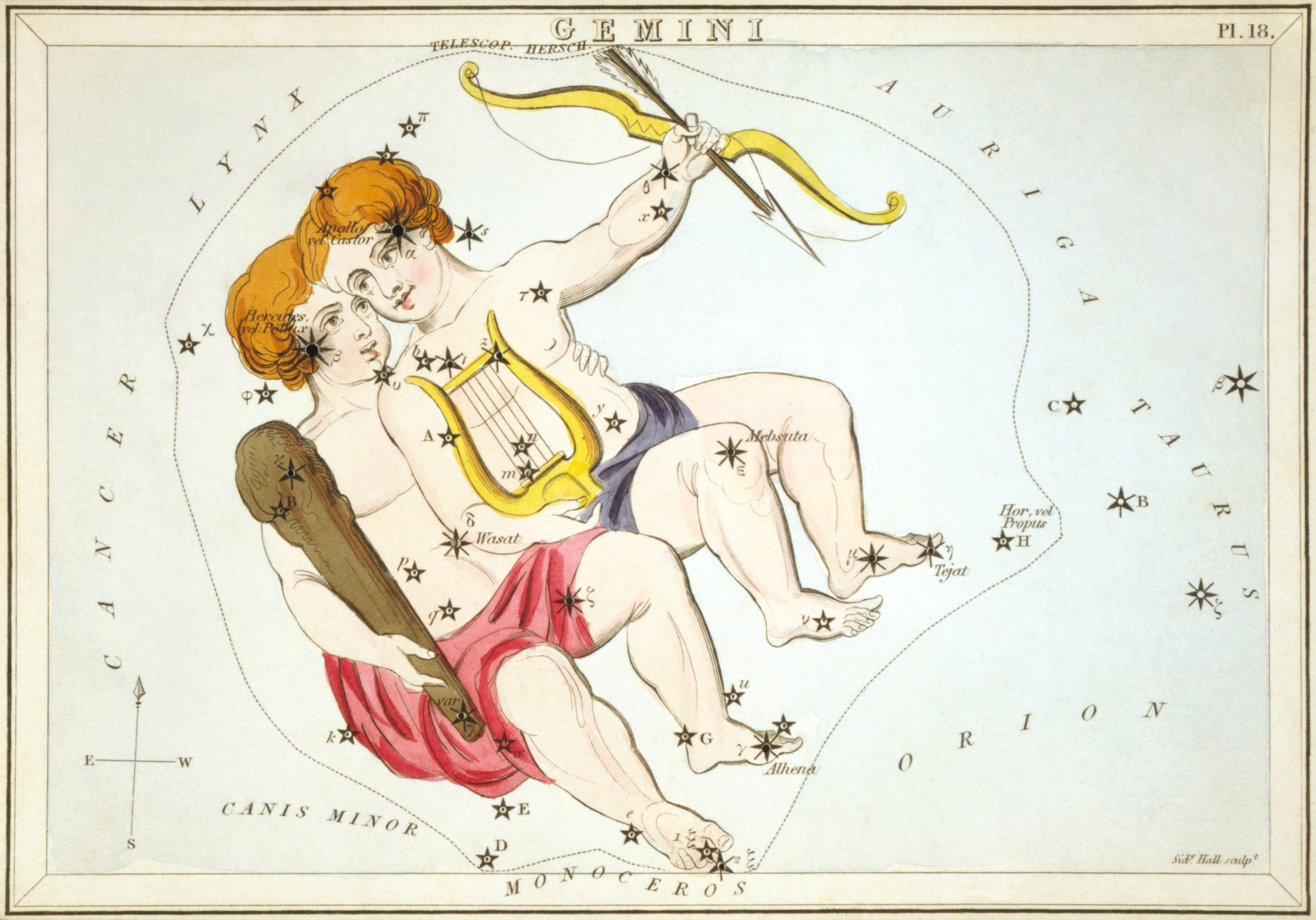
Gemini as depicted in Urania's Mirror, a set of constellation cards published in London c.1825.

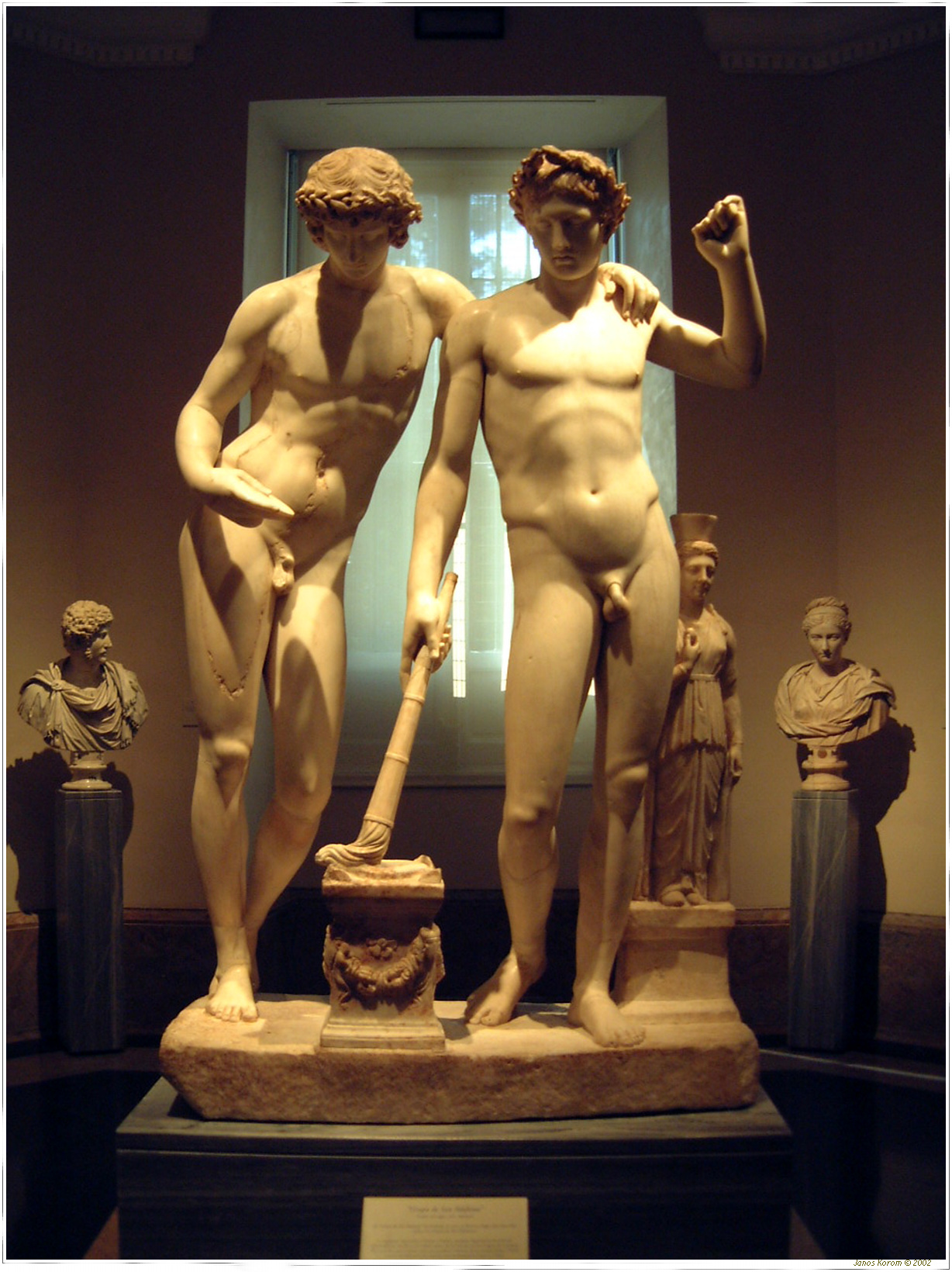
Sculpture showing Castor and Pollux, the legend behind the third astrological sign in the Zodiac and the constellation of Gemini

In Babylonian astronomy, the stars Castor and Pollux were known as the Great Twins. The Twins were regarded as minor gods and were called Meshlamtaea and Lugalirra, meaning respectively 'The One who has arisen from the Underworld' and the 'Mighty King'. Both names can be understood as titles of Nergal, the major Babylonian god of plague and pestilence, who was king of the Underworld.

In Greek mythology, Gemini was associated with the myth of Castor and Pollux, the children of Leda and Argonauts both. Pollux was the son of Zeus, who seduced Leda, while Castor was the son of Tyndareus, king of Sparta and Leda's husband. Castor and Pollux were also mythologically associated with St. Elmo's fire in their role as the protectors of sailors. When Castor died, because he was mortal, Pollux begged his father Zeus to give Castor immortality, and he did, by uniting them together in the heavens.

== Visualizations ==
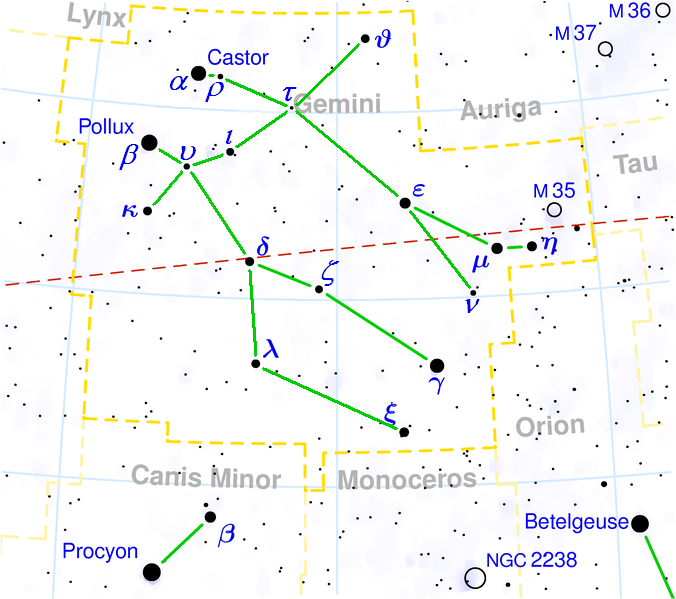
Diagram of H. A. Rey's alternative way to connect the stars of the constellation Gemini. Twins are shown holding hands.

Gemini is dominated by Castor and Pollux, two bright stars that appear relatively very closely together forming an o shape, encouraging the mythological link between the constellation and twinship. The twin above and to the right (as seen from the Northern Hemisphere) is Castor, whose brightest star is α Gem; it is a second-magnitude star and represents Castor's head. The twin below and to the left is Pollux, whose brightest star is β Gem (more commonly called Pollux); it is of the first magnitude and represents Pollux's head. Furthermore, the other stars can be visualized as two parallel lines descending from the two main stars, making it look like two figures.

H. A. Rey has suggested an alternative to the traditional visualization that connected the stars of Gemini to show twins holding hands. Pollux's torso is represented by the star υ Gem, Pollux's right hand by ι Gem, Pollux's left hand by κ Gem; all three of these stars are of the fourth magnitude. Pollux's pelvis is represented by the star δ Gem, Pollux's right knee by ζ Gem, Pollux's right foot by γ Gem, Pollux's left knee by λ Gem, and Pollux's left foot by ξ Gem. γ Gem is of the second magnitude, while δ and ξ Gem are of the third magnitude. Castor's torso is represented by the star τ Gem, Castor's left hand by ι Gem (which he shares with Pollux), Castor's right hand by θ Gem; all three of these stars are of the fourth magnitude. Castor's pelvis is represented by the star ε Gem, Castor's left foot by ν Gem, and Castor's right foot by μ Gem and η Gem; ε, μ, and η Gem are of the third magnitude. The brightest star in this constellation is Pollux.

== Astronomy ==
In Meteorologica (1 343b30) Aristotle mentions that he observed Jupiter in conjunction with and then occulting a star in Gemini. This is the earliest-known observation of this nature. A study published in 1990 suggests the star involved was 1 Geminorum and the event took place on 5 December 337 BC.

When William Herschel discovered Uranus on 13 March 1781 it was located near η Gem. In 1930 Clyde Tombaugh exposed a series of photographic plates centred on δ Gem and discovered Pluto.

== Equivalents ==
In Chinese astronomy, the stars that correspond to Gemini are located in two areas: the White Tiger of the West (西方白虎, Xī Fāng Bái Hǔ) and the Vermillion Bird of the South (南方朱雀, Nán Fāng Zhū Què).

In some cultures, the twin in Gemini refers to 'the unborn twin' and represents a spiritual or dual self that exists within.

== Astrology ==
As of 2011, the Sun appears in the constellation Gemini from June 21 to July 20. In tropical astrology, the Sun is considered to be in the sign Gemini from May 22 to June 21, and in sidereal astrology, from June 16 to July 16.

== See also ==
- Gemini OB1 Molecular Cloud
- Geminga, Gemini gamma-ray source
- Gemini in Chinese astronomy
- IC 444, reflection nebula
- Messier 35 open cluster
- Cancer Minor (constellation) – Obsolete constellation inside modern Gemini

== Sources ==
- Levy, David H. (2005). Deep Sky Objects. Prometheus Books. ISBN 1-59102-361-0.
- Rey, H. A. (1997). The Stars — A New Way To See Them (Enlarged World-Wide ed.). Boston: Houghton Mifflin. ISBN 0-395-24830-2..
- Ridpath, Ian; Tirion, Wil (2017). Stars and Planets Guide. London: Collins. ISBN 978-0-00-823927-5. Princeton: Princeton University Press. ISBN 978-0-691-17788-5.
