= List of star systems within 70–75 light-years =

This is a list of star systems within 70–75 light years of Earth.

== List ==
Key
#	Visible to the unaided eye
$	Bright star (absolute magnitude of +8.5 or brighter)
‡	White dwarf
§	Brown dwarf or sub-brown dwarf
*	Nearest in constellation

System	Star or (sub-) brown dwarf	Distance (ly)	Constellation	Coordinates: RA, Dec (Ep J2000, Eq J2000)	Stellar class	Apparent magnitude (V)	Parallax (mas)	Notes and additional references
GJ 4268		70.0 ± 1.0			KV			
GJ 3071		70.0 ± 2.5			KV			
HIP 88976		70.0			MV			
HD 215152		70.39 ± 0.04	Aquarius	22^{h} 43^{m} 21.3028^{s} −06° 24′ 02.953″	K3 V	8.13		Has 4 exoplanets.
HD 90089		70.1	Camelopardalis	10^{h} 31^{m} 04.7079^{s} +82° 33′ 31.146″	F2V	5.25		The temperature of the dust is around 30K.
Gliese 694.2		70.1			MV			
Gliese 799.1		70.2			DA3			
HD 16673		70.3			FV			
HIP 65083		70.3			MV			
HD 329868		70.3			MV			
GJ 1170		70.3			MV			
Epsilon Serpentis$		70.4	Serpens	15^{h} 50^{m} 48.96622^{s} +04° 28′ 39.8311″	A2Vm	3.71#		
GJ 3059		70.4			MV			
Zeta Leporis$ (Darlugal)		70.5	Lepus	05^{h} 46^{m} 57.34096^{s} −14° 49′ 19.0199″	A2IV	3.524#		
84 Ceti	A	70.5	Cetus	02^{h} 41^{m} 13.99720^{s} −00° 41′ 44.3845″	F7V	5.709		
84 Ceti	B	70.5	Cetus	02^{h} 41^{m} 13.99720^{s} −00° 41′ 44.3845″	K2V			
HIP 15332		70.5			MV			
HD 159062	A	70.619	Hercules	17^{h} 30^{m} 16.42797^{s} +47° 24′ 07.9010″	G9V	7.305		
HD 159062	B	70.619	Hercules	17^{h} 30^{m} 16.42797^{s} +47° 24′ 07.9010″	D			
Sigma Coronae Borealis	A	70.7	Corona Borealis	16^{h} 14^{m} 40.854^{s} +33° 51′ 31.02″	F9V	5.64		
Sigma Coronae Borealis	B	70.7	Corona Borealis	16^{h} 14^{m} 40.854^{s} +33° 51′ 31.02″	G0V			
Sigma Coronae Borealis	C	70.7	Corona Borealis	16^{h} 14^{m} 40.854^{s} +33° 51′ 31.02″	M2.5			
WISE 2327-2730		70.8			L9			
Gliese 747.4		70.9			MV			
Theta Sculptoris		71.1	Sculptor	00^{h} 11^{m} 44.02079^{s} −35° 07′ 59.2320″	F5V	5.236		
Alpha Hydri$		71.3	Hydrus	01^{h} 58^{m} 46.19467^{s} −61° 34′ 11.4948″	F0IV	2.90#		
Lambda Arae		71.3	Ara	17^{h} 40^{m} 23.826^{s} −49° 24′ 56.10″	F4V	4.77		
HD 91324	A	71.3	Vela	10^{h} 31^{m} 21.82130^{s} −53° 42′ 55.7373″	F9V	4.89		
HD 91324	B	71.3	Vela	10^{h} 31^{m} 21.82130^{s} −53° 42′ 55.7373″	M5			
Eta Scorpii		71.6	Scorpius	17^{h} 12^{m} 09.19565^{s} −43° 14′ 21.0905″	F5IV	3.33		
HD 108954		71.6			FV			
HD 164922		71.69 ± 0.03	Hercules	18^{h} 02^{m} 30.86234^{s} +26° 18′ 46.8050″	G9V	+6.99		Has 4 exoplanets.
WISE 0031-3840		71.8			L2 pec			
Psi^{1} Draconis (Dziban)		71.9	Draco	17^{h} 41^{m} 56.35536^{s} +72° 08′ 55.8481″	F5V + F8V	4.59/5.81		has 1 known planet
WISE 0952+1955		72.1			T6			
WISE 1517+0529		72.4			T8			
WISE 0836-1859		72.4			T8 pec			
VHS J1256-1257	A	72.4	Corvus	12^{h} 56^{m} 02.1337^{s} −12° 57′ 21.924″	M7.5			
VHS J1256-1257	B	72.4	Corvus	12^{h} 56^{m} 02.1337^{s} −12° 57′ 21.924″	M7.5			
VHS J1256-1257	C	72.4	Corvus	12^{h} 56^{m} 02.1337^{s} −12° 57′ 21.924″	L7.0			
WISE 1717+6129		72.7			T8			
Epsilon Cygni (Aljanah)		72.7 ± 0.2	Cygnus	20^{h} 46^{m} 12.68236^{s} +33° 58′ 12.9250″	K0III	2.48		
CD−35 2722	A	72.93 ± 0.02	Columba	06^{h} 09^{m} 19.21^{s} −35° 49′ 31.1″	M1Ve	11.083±0.07	44.7203±0.0128	
CD−35 2722	B§	72.93 ± 0.02	Columba	06^{h} 09^{m} 19.21^{s} −35° 49′ 31.1″	L0-1	11.083±0.07	44.7203±0.0128	
94 Ceti	A	73.0	Cetus	03^{h} 12^{m} 46.43719^{s} −01° 11′ 45.9613″	F8V	5.07		has 1 known planet
94 Ceti	B	73.0	Cetus	03^{h} 12^{m} 46.43719^{s} −01° 11′ 45.9613″	M3V			has 1 known planet
94 Ceti	C	73.0	Cetus	03^{h} 12^{m} 46.43719^{s} −01° 11′ 45.9613″	MV			has 1 known planet
HD 63433		73.035	Gemini	07^{h} 49^{m} 55.061^{s} +27° 21′ 47.46″	G5V	6.92		Has three known exoplanets
Mu Cygni	A	73.1	Cygnus	21^{h} 44^{m} 08.57767^{s} +28° 44′ 33.4567″	F6V	4.50		
Mu Cygni	B	73.1	Cygnus	21^{h} 44^{m} 08.57767^{s} +28° 44′ 33.4567″	G2V			
WISE 0221+3842		73.1			T6.5			
HD 14214	A	73.1	Cetus	02^{h} 18^{m} 01.44332^{s} +01° 45′ 28.1235″	G0.5IVb	5.60		
HD 14214	B	73.1	Cetus	02^{h} 18^{m} 01.44332^{s} +01° 45′ 28.1235″	~M0V			
Ross 593		73.12			M3			
18 Puppis		73.3	Puppis	08^{h} 10^{m} 39.98^{s} −13° 47′ 57.7″	FV			
Nu Octantis	A	73.5±0.68	Octans	21^{h} 41^{m} 28.64977^{s} −77° 23′ 24.1563″	K1III	3.73		Has one confirmed exoplanet (Nu Octantis Ab).
Nu Octantis	B	73.5±0.68	Octans	21^{h} 41^{m} 28.64977^{s} −77° 23′ 24.1563″	D			Has one confirmed exoplanet (Nu Octantis Ab).
HR 4657		73.6			FV			
HD 139461/139460		73.8			FV			
HD 167425		73.8			FV			
Alpha Serpentis (Unukalhai)$		74 ± 0.3	Serpens	15^{h} 44^{m} 16.07431^{s} +06° 25′ 32.2633″	K2 IIIb CN1	2.623#		
EZ Ceti		74 ± 5	Cetus	01^{h} 49^{m} 35.10277^{s} −10° 41′ 11.0719″	G3V	6.75		
Zeta Virginis	A (Heze)$	74.1	Virgo	13^{h} 34^{m} 41.591^{s} −00° 35′ 44.95″	A3V	3.40#		
Zeta Virginis	B	74.1	Virgo	13^{h} 34^{m} 41.591^{s} −00° 35′ 44.95″	M4V-M7V			
39 Leonis	A	74.1	Leo	10^{h} 17^{m} 14.538^{s} +23° 06′ 22.38″	F6V	5.81/11.40		
39 Leonis	B	74.1	Leo	10^{h} 17^{m} 14.538^{s} +23° 06′ 22.38″	M1			
Upsilon Aquarii		74.2 ± 1.2	Aquarius	22^{h} 34^{m} 41.636^{s} −20° 42′ 29.58″	F5V	5.21		
Alpha¹ Librae		74.9 ± 0.7	Libra	14^{h} 50^{m} 41.18097^{s} −15° 59′ 50.0482″	F3V	5.15		
WISE 1809+3838		74.4			T8			
System	Star or (sub-) brown dwarf	Distance (ly)	Constellation	Coordinates: RA, Dec (Ep J2000, Eq J2000)	Stellar class	Apparent magnitude (V)	Parallax (mas)	Notes and additional references

== See also ==
- Lists of stars
- List of star systems within 65–70 light-years
- List of star systems within 75–80 light-years
- List of nearest stars and brown dwarfs
