= MP Muscae =

Pre-main-sequence star in the constellation Musca

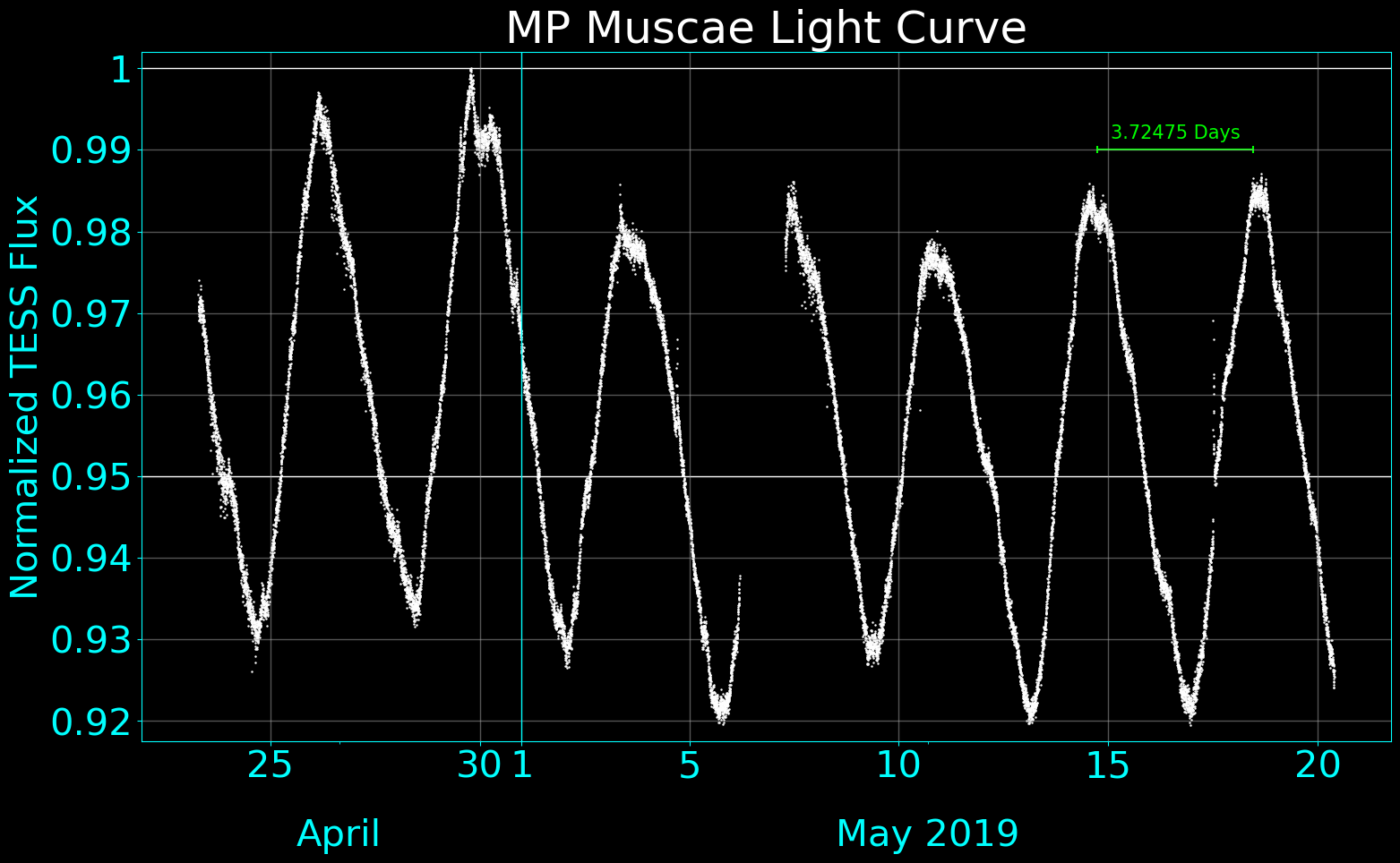
- Light curve for MP Muscae, plotted from TESS data. The green bar shows the 3.72 day period found by Doyle et al.

Observation data Epoch J2000 Equinox ICRS
- Constellation: Musca
- Right ascension: 13^{h} 22^{m} 07.5422^{s}
- Declination: −69° 38′ 12.219″
- Apparent magnitude (V): 10.20 – 10.47

Characteristics
- Evolutionary stage: Pre-main sequence
- Spectral type: K1Ve
- Variable type: T Tauri

Astrometry
Radial velocity (R_{v})	7.20±1.65 km/s
Proper motion (μ)	RA: −38.353 mas/yr Dec.: −20.004 mas/yr
Parallax (π)	10.2152±0.0125 mas
Distance	319.3 ± 0.4 ly (97.9 ± 0.1 pc)
Absolute magnitude (M_{V})	+5.47

Details
Mass	1.30±0.08 M_{☉}
Radius	1.25 R_{☉}
Luminosity	1.26±0.04 L_{☉}
Surface gravity (log g)	4.15 cgs
Temperature	4,600 K
Rotation	3.72 days
Rotational velocity (v sin i)	14.0 km/s
Age	7–10 Myr

Other designations
- PDS 66, CPD−68°1894, TIC 339812943, TYC 9246-971-1

Database references
SIMBAD	data

MP Muscae (PDS 66) is a star in the constellation Musca. A young star, it has not yet begun nuclear fusion at its core. MP Muscae is surrounded by a protoplanetary disk, and has one known exoplanet. Around 1.3 times the mass of the Sun and 97.9 parsecs (319 ly) away, it may be the nearest analog to the young Solar System.

== Characteristics ==
MP Muscae has an age between seven and 10 million years, a factor of over 450 times younger than the Solar System. Such young age implies the star has not yet begun nuclear fusion at its core and thus is a pre-main-sequence star. It is a T Tauri variable star and its apparent magnitude varies from 10.20 to 10.47 over a 1.36396-day period. The star is still accreting mass from its protoplanetary disk at a very low rate. Such accretion creates X-ray emission. The spectrum of this star matches a spectral class of K1Ve, indicating that it is a K-type star with spectral emission lines.

The mass of the star has been measured by observing the Doppler shift caused by the gas disk's rotation, yielding a value of 1.30±0.08 M_{☉}. The stellar characteristics of the star and the disk are thought to be similar to those of the primordial Solar System, and given its distance of 97.9 parsecs (319 ly), MP Muscae appears to be the closest analog to a primordial Solar System. The star is within the Epsilon Chamaeleontis stellar association.

== Protoplanetary disk ==
The protoplanetary disk around MP Muscae is made of both gas and dust. The dust disk extends up to 45 au from the central star and has a mass less than 28.4±2.8 M_{🜨} (0.089±0.009 M_{J}). The gas disk extends up to 120 au and has a mass somewhere between 0.1 and 1 M_{J}. Some estimates of the total mass of the disk reach 15.4±1.6 M_{J}, although this is highly uncertain since those estimates rely on assumptions with poorly constrained parameters.

The disk has been considered unusual in that it has no rings and gaps associated with interactions between the disk and hidden planets. Rings and gaps have been found in virtually every protoplanetary disk with an advanced age. However, previous observations of the disk have been made only in short wavelengths less than 1.3 mm, where the opacity of the disk is higher, preventing features to be easily distinguished. When the ALMA telescope observed the system at 3 mm, an inner cavity at 3 au and a ring at 10 au were observed. The 3 au cavity is now associated with the known exoplanet. Additionally, a cavity was found at 50 au, also with ALMA.

== Planetary system ==
The measurement of proper motions by the Gaia spacecraft during its DR2 and DR3 data releases, taken in different times, were found to be significantly discrepant with each other, which is often seen as the effect of a companion, such as an exoplanet, gravitationally pulling its host star. Additionally, the disk has a cavity at a separation of 3 au (consistent with the estimated separation of a planet causing the proper motion anomaly), hinting at the presence of a protoplanet in that region. Both are strong evidence of an orbiting exoplanet. The planet, named MP Muscae b, is a gas giant estimated to be five times as massive as Jupiter.

The planet's orbital separation is between 1 and 3 astronomical units, which may be inside the habitable zone of the host star. It is below the snow line where gas giants normally form, and thus it is unlikely that the planet formed in its current orbit, but instead underwent planetary migration.

Although multiple young stars with protoplanetary disks are known, robust direct detections of protoplanets have been made only in PDS 70 and IRAS 04125+2902. Conventional methods such as transit are inefficient due to interference of the protodisk, while Doppler spectroscopy is unusable since young stars are highly active, affecting radial velocity measurements. A planet highly embedded in gas and dust also can not be directly imaged. Instead, such planets are uncovered or posited by the presence of structures within the disk, such as gaps and disks. The astrometry technique may be valuable since it appears to be feasible to detect planets in young stars such as MP Muscae b, although in very young stars, younger than MP Muscae, proper motion anomalies can be induced by intrinsic processes.

One 2026 publication reported emission of ^{28}SiS and ^{30}SiS in MP Muscae's protoplanetary disk. These were the second and first detection of ^{28}SiS and ^{30}SiS in protoplanetary disks, respectively. The isopotologues are within a compact source, 60 au away from MP Muscae, estimated to have a radius between 0.5 and 4 au. The compact source appears to be orbiting the star, indicating that it may correspond to a circumplanetary envelope. To account for the ^{30}SiS detection, roughly 10^{22} to 10^{23} g of silicon monosulfide must be present. The mass of the central planet is estimated at 10 M_{🜨}.

The MP Muscae planetary system
Companion (in order from star)	Mass	Semimajor axis (AU)	Orbital period (days)	Eccentricity	Inclination (°)	Radius
b	5 M_{J}	1–3	—	—	—	—
(unconfirmed)	10 M_{🜨}	60	—	—	—	—

== See also ==
- TW Hydrae
- V4046 Sagittarii
