= HIP 67522 b =

Exoplanet

Discovery
- Discovered by: THYME (Rizzuto et al.)
- Discovery date: 2020
- Detection method: Primary Transit

Designations
- Alternative names: HD 120411 b, Gaia DR2 6113920619134019456 b, TYC 7794-2268-1 b

Orbital characteristics
- Eccentricity: 0.059+0.193 −0.046
- Orbital period (sidereal): 6.959503±0.000016 d
- Inclination: 89.34°+0.45° −0.54° (to plane of sky); 5.8+2.8 −5.7 ° (to host star's equator, projected)
- Argument of periastron: 343.0+92.0 −140.0 °
- Star: HIP 67522

Physical characteristics
- Mean radius: 0.897±0.051 R_{J}
- Mass: 13.8 ± 1.0, <20 M_{🜨}, 29.8 ± 3 M_{🜨}
- Mean density: (uncertain)
- Temperature: 1174±21 K

HIP 67522 b is a hot Neptune or sub-Saturn exoplanet orbiting the G-type star HIP 67522, approximately 415 light-years from Earth in the constellation Centaurus. It was discovered using the Transiting Exoplanet Survey Satellite (TESS). It is one of the youngest transiting planets of any type, and one of only four others less than 100 million years old (along with AU Mic b, V1298 Tau c, DS Tuc Ab and TOI-942 b) to have the angle between its orbit and its host star's rotation measured, at 5.8+2.8
−5.7 degrees. This planet, in turn, may help in understanding how other hot Neptunes form.

There is also evidence that another planet might also be present in the planetary system.

== Characteristics and formation ==
Due to its young age, HIP 67522 b has not reached its final size. Also due to the Kelvin–Helmholtz mechanism, which occurs as a result of the planet itself cooling, its internal pressure drops, which will in turn cause the planet to shrink. Its final size will depend on the composition of its core.

It was shown in 2024 that HIP 67522 b is one of the least dense known planets, with a density less than 0.10 g/cm^{3}. It might have formed beyond the water-snowline, where the contamination by both rocky and icy materials frequently takes place. In 2025, it was revealed with certainty that HIP 67522 b triggers the increase in flare from the host star via the star-planet magnetic interactions. These flares might have caused the shrinkage of the planet's atmosphere. In 2026, by using VLT, the presence of water vapour (H_{2}O) and carbon monoxide (CO) in the planet's atmosphere was revealed with high confidence, along with day-to-night winds. The mass of planet was measured at 29.8 ± 3 M_{🜨}, which is 3σ inconsistent with the previous estimate from JWST. Also a tentative detection of semiheavy water (HDO) was reported, which would be the first detection of deuterium in exoplanet's atmosphere if confirmed.
