= HD 63433 =

Sun-like star in the constellation of Gemini

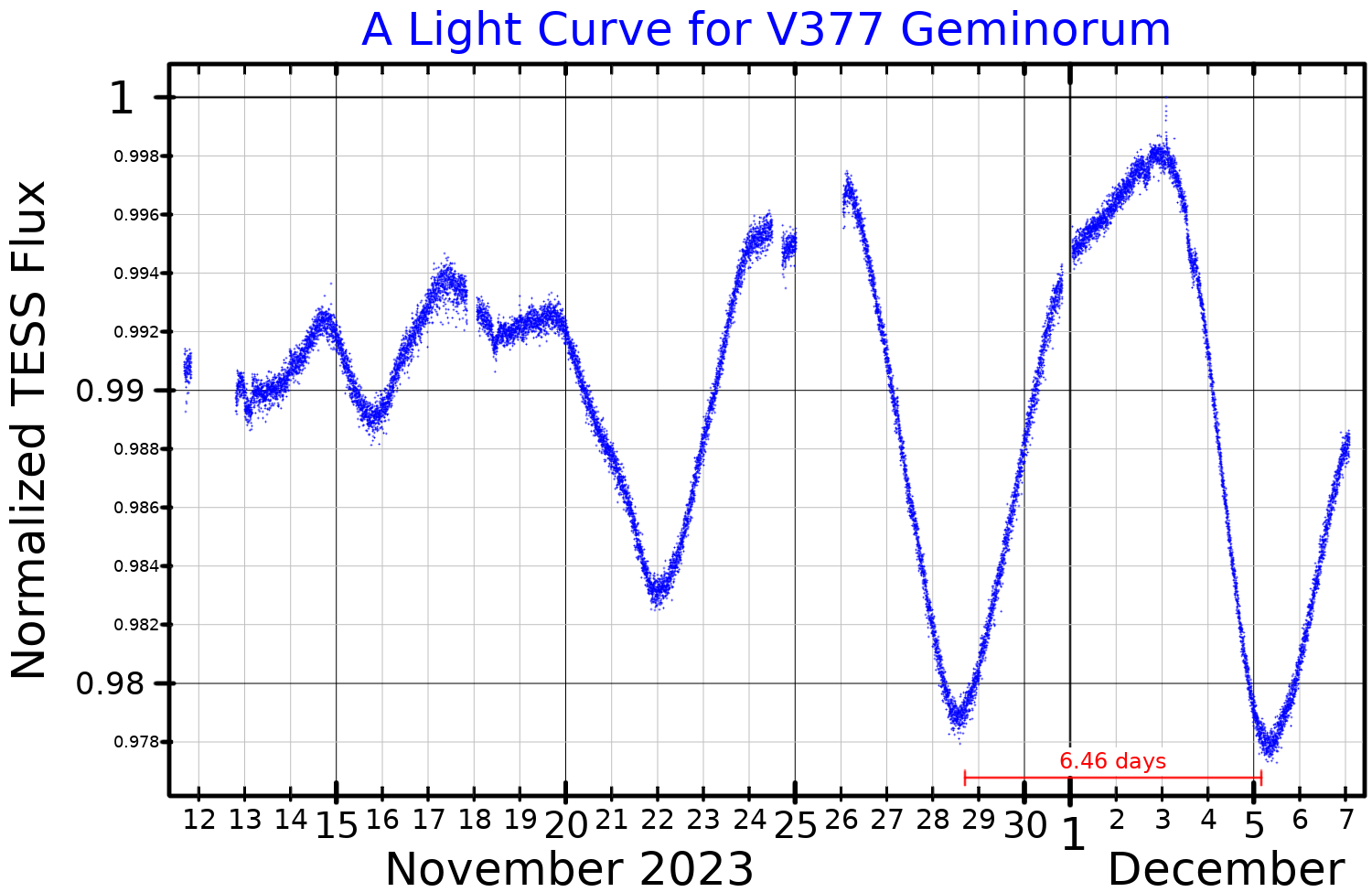
- A light curve for V377 Geminorum, plotted from TESS data, with the 6.46 day rotation period shown in red,

Observation data Epoch J2000 Equinox J2000
- Constellation: Gemini
- Right ascension: 07^{h} 49^{m} 55.061^{s}
- Declination: +27° 21′ 47.46″
- Apparent magnitude (V): 6.92

Characteristics
- Evolutionary stage: Main sequence
- Spectral type: G5V
- Variable type: BY Draconis

Astrometry
Radial velocity (R_{v})	−16.07±0.13 km/s
Proper motion (μ)	RA: −10.220 mas/yr Dec.: −11.235 mas/yr
Parallax (π)	44.6848±0.0228 mas
Distance	72.99 ± 0.04 ly (22.38 ± 0.01 pc)
Absolute magnitude (M_{V})	5.19

Details
Mass	0.99±0.03 M_{☉}
Radius	0.912±0.034 R_{☉}
Luminosity	0.753±0.026 L_{☉}
Surface gravity (log g)	4.52±0.05 cgs
Temperature	5,640±74 K
Metallicity [Fe/H]	0.03±0.05 dex
Rotation	6.45±0.05 d
Rotational velocity (v sin i)	7.3±0.3 km/s
Age	414±23 Myr

Other designations
- V377 Gem, BD+27°1490, HD 63433, HIP 38228, SAO 79729, PPM 98012, TOI-1726, TYC 1933-747-1, GSC 01933-00747, 2MASS J07495506+2721473

Database references
SIMBAD	data
Exoplanet Archive	data
ARICNS	data

HD 63433 (TOI-1726, V377 Geminorum) is a G-type main sequence star located 73 light-years from Earth in the zodiacal constellation Gemini, visually close to the star Pollux. With an apparent magnitude of 6.9, it is not visible to the naked eye, but can be seen with a small telescope or binoculars. It is part of the Ursa Major Moving Group.

HD 63433 has nearly the same radius and mass as the Sun, hence is classified as a Sun-like star. However, it is much younger than the Sun, less than one tenth as old at about 400 million years. There are three exoplanets orbiting it: one is classified as an Earth-sized planet, while the other two are mini-Neptunes.

== Characteristics ==
HD 63433 is a G-type main sequence star with a radius of 0.912 R_{☉}, a mass of 0.99 M_{☉}, an effective temperature of 5,640 K and a spectral type of G5V. Its properties are quite similar to those of the Sun, which has a spectral type of G2V and a temperature of 5,772 K. Therefore it is classified as a solar analog. HD 63433, however, is much younger than the Sun, having an age of 414 million years, just 9% of the solar age of 4.6 billion years. It has a surface gravity of 33.8 g (Note: From a logarithm of 4.52, later divided by 980.665.) and a rotational period of 6.45 days, which is 3.8 times faster than the Sun.

With an apparent magnitude of 6.92, HD 63433 is below the limit for naked-eye visibility, typically defined as 6.5, which means that this star is not generally visible to the naked eye but easily visible using a small telescope or binoculars. Despite being below naked-eye visibility, it is the third-brightest star with transiting exoplanets confirmed by the Transiting Exoplanet Survey Satellite; only Pi Mensae at magnitude 5.65 and HR 858 at magnitude 6.38 are brighter.

According to stellar kinematics, lithium abundance and stellar rotation, HD 63433 is part of the Ursa Major moving group. It was initially identified as a possible member by Gaidos (1998) and its membership in the moving group was finally confirmed by Mann et al. in 2020. As it is part of this moving group, its age is estimated at 414±23 million years, the same as the group.

HD 63433 is located in the northern hemisphere, about 73 light-years from the Earth, in the constellation of Gemini. It is visually close to Pollux, the brightest star in the constellation. HD 63433 is predicted to approach within 7.33 light-years of the Sun in 1.33 million years, when it will be one of the nearest stars to the Sun. Its closest neighbor is the orange dwarf HD 63991; the two are separated by a distance of 2.7 light years.

Nearest stars to HD 63433
Name	Distance (light-years)
HD 63991	2.7
LSPM J0801+2342	6.1
HD 68017	9.0
BD+31 1781	9.1
G 90-52	9.2

== Variability ==
HD 63433 belongs to the class of BY Draconis variables, stars that vary in brightness due to their rotation together with sunspots and other chromospheric activity. The apparent magnitude of the star varies by up to 0.05 magnitudes over a period of 6.46 days.

It was first found to be variable by Gaidos et al. in 2000, and given the variable-star designation V377 Geminorum in 2006.

== Planetary system ==
The star HD 63433 is orbited by 3 exoplanets, all discovered by the transit method. The first to be identified, HD 63433 b and HD 63433 c, are mini-Neptunes, discovered by Mann et al. in 2020 using the Transiting Exoplanet Survey Satellite. In 2024, an additional planet was discovered after an analysis of a transit signal detected by TESS. Named HD 63433 d, it is an Earth-sized planet.

According to theoretical models, the composition of the mini-Neptunes HD 63433 b and c is mostly silicate and water, with no iron dominance, surrounded by a gaseous envelope which, in the case of planet c, makes up around 2% of the planet.

The planetary system of HD 63433 is quite young: at around 400 million years old, it is only 9.13% as old as the Solar System. (Note: The age of the Solar System is 4.532 billion years.) HD 63433 d is also the smallest known planet that is less than 500 million years old.

Temperature comparisons	HD 63433 b	HD 63433 c	HD 63433 d
Global equilibrium temperature	769 – 967 K 496 – 694 °C; 925 – 1281 °F	540 – 679 K 267 – 406 °C; 513 – 763 °F	1040 K 767 °C; 1413 °F

The HD 63433 planetary system
Companion (in order from star)	Mass	Semimajor axis (AU)	Orbital period (days)	Eccentricity	Inclination (°)	Radius
d	—	0.0503±0.0027	4.21	0.16+0.36 −0.12	88.73±1	1.073+0.046 −0.044 R_{🜨}
b	<21.76 M_{🜨}	0.0719+0.0044 −0.0031	7.11	0.24+0.27 −0.18	—	2.14+0.087 −0.069 R_{🜨}
c	15.54±3.86 M_{🜨}	0.1458±0.015	20.55	0.161+0.014 −0.013	—	2.692+0.108 −0.088 R_{🜨}

=== HD 63433 b ===
The middle planet, HD 63433 b, is a mini-Neptune planet that was discovered together with HD 63433 c. HD 63433 b is 2.14 times larger than Earth, but is about 45% smaller than Neptune. (Note: Neptune is 3.883 times larger than Earth.) The planet has an upper mass limit of 21.7 M_{🜨}, which is 21% greater than the mass of Neptune (17.15 M_{🜨}). These values imply an upper density limit of 13 g/cm^{3}, twice that of Earth (Note: The density of Earth is 5.513 g/cm^{3}.) and similar to that of the chemical element mercury. HD 63433 b orbits its parent star at a distance of 0.0719 astronomical units (10,760,000 km) – about 5 times closer than Mercury is to the Sun – and completes one revolution every 7 days and 3 hours. The relative proximity of its star makes it hot, with an equilibrium temperature between 769 and 967 Kelvin (496 and 694 °C). (Note: Assuming albedos of 0.6 and 0 respectively.)

HD 63433 b was probably a mini-Neptune that later lost its atmosphere. Some properties, such as the lack of absorption of Ly-α detected during its transit, and its mass-loss timescale being shorter than the age of the planetary system, indicate that it has already lost its primordial atmosphere, and could be a rocky planetary core. However, if HD 63433 b were a rocky core, it would need to be unusually massive and, therefore, a water-rich composition in addition to an atmosphere with a high mean molecular weight could explain both the radius and the non-detection of the Ly-α.

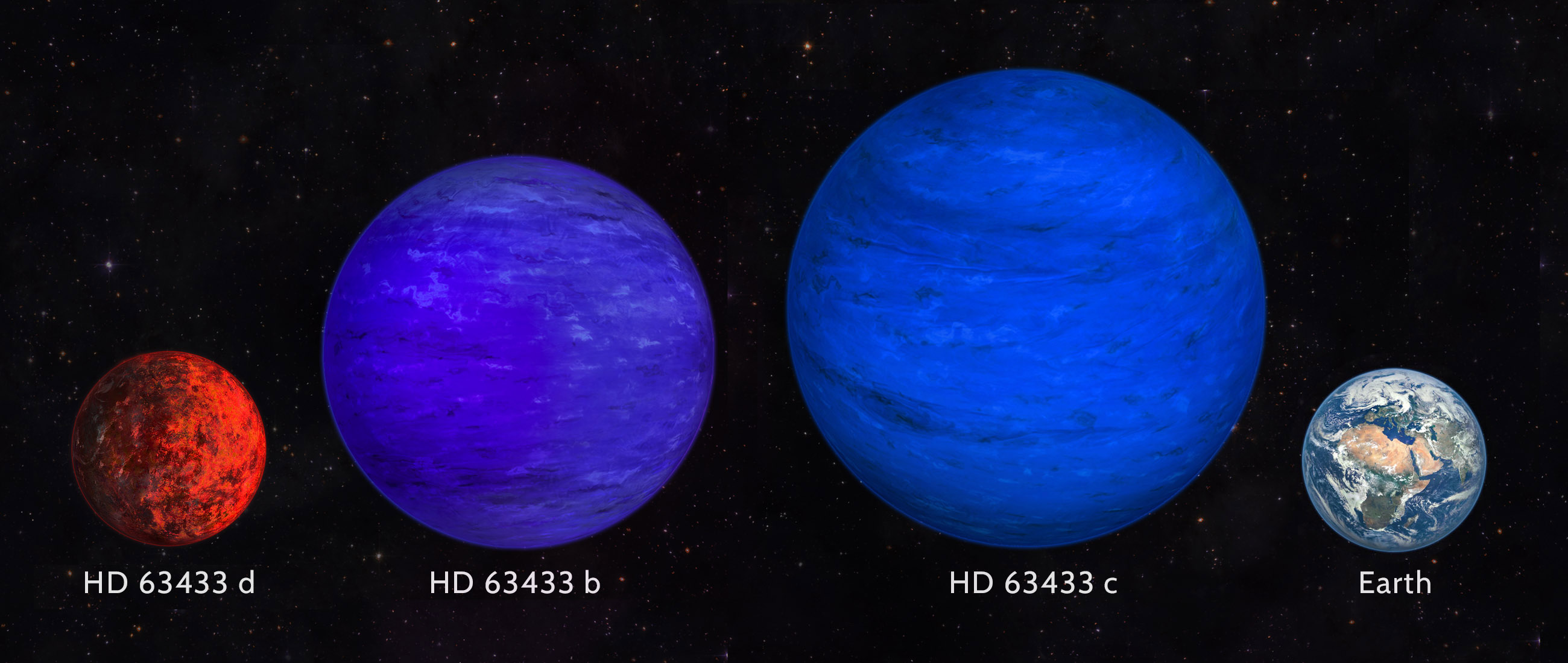
Artist's impression of known planets in the HD 63433 system and size comparison with Earth

=== HD 63433 c ===
The outermost planet, HD 63433 c, is a mini-Neptune discovered together with HD 63433 b. It is 2.7 times larger than Earth, but 30% smaller than the Solar System's ice giants Neptune and Uranus. Being 15.5 times more massive than the Earth, it is more massive than Uranus (14.54 M_{🜨}) but still less massive than Neptune (17.15 M_{🜨}). The density of HD 63433 c calculated at 4.6 g/cm^{3}, slightly lower than that of Earth but greater than the densities of all gas giants in the Solar System.

Orbiting its star at a distance of 0.145 astronomical units (21,700,000 km) in a period of 20 days, it is the outermost planet in its planetary system, but still close to its star, making it a warm planet, with a planetary equilibrium temperature estimated between 267 and 406 °C. (Note: Assuming albedos of 0.6 and 0 respectively.)

Due to the high radiation received from its host star, the atmosphere of HD 63433 c, made up of hydrogen, is slowly being stripped away and escaping from the planet. The hot gas escapes into space at a velocity of 50 km/s, forming a gas cocoon 12 times larger than the planet itself. As its atmosphere evaporates, HD 63433 c will slowly become a super-Earth planet.

=== HD 63433 d ===
HD 63433 d was the last planet to be discovered in the system, 4 years after planets b and c. With a diameter of ~13,690 km, it is very similar to Earth in size, being only 7% larger, but its mass is currently unknown. It is the innermost planet orbiting HD 63433, having a semi-major axis (mean distance from its star) of 0.0503 astronomical units (7,520,000 km) and an orbital period of just 4 days. The proximity to its star makes it extremely hot, having a daytime temperature estimated at 1,260 °C (2,300 °F), (Note: Assuming an albedo of 0, similar to the measured albedo of TRAPPIST-1b.) hot enough to melt all the minerals present on its surface, as well as being tidally locked, meaning that one half of the planet is always facing towards its star, while the other is always facing away from it. The planet may lack any substantial atmosphere.

It is believed that the dayside of the planet, always facing its star due to tidal locking, is fully composed of lava due to the high surface temperature, in addition to possibly having volcanic activity. Meanwhile, the nightside of the planet, which never faces its star, may be the opposite, resembling Pluto with glaciers of frozen nitrogen.

HD 63433 d was discovered in 2024, through an analysis of a transit observation made by the Transiting Exoplanet Survey Satellite (TESS). As two other planets had already been discovered in the system, the transit signals of these objects were removed, thus revealing an additional transit signal that reappeared every 4.2 days. Further investigation allowed researchers to confirm that this signal was from another orbiting exoplanet, now called HD 63433 d. The discovery was announced on January 10, 2024, in The Astronomical Journal.

== Scientific importance ==
The HD 63433 planetary system plays an important role in understanding the evolution of planetary systems in the first billion years after formation. As HD 63433 is relatively bright (apparent magnitude 6.9) and close (73 ly away), its planets b and c can have their atmospheres characterized by the Hubble Space Telescope and James Webb Space Telescope. This star is also a favorable target for studies of atmospheric mass loss in exoplanets, as it is a young and active star with close-in mini-Neptune planets, in addition to having a negative radial velocity (−16.07 km/s).

== See also ==
- List of star systems within 70–75 light-years
