= HD 14214 =

Spectroscopic binary in the constellation Cetus

- Location of HD 14214 (circled)

Observation data Epoch J2000 Equinox ICRS
- Constellation: Cetus
- Right ascension: 02^{h} 18^{m} 01.44332^{s}
- Declination: +01° 45′ 28.1235″
- Apparent magnitude (V): 5.60

Characteristics
- Evolutionary stage: subgiant
- Spectral type: G0IV or G0.5IVb (A); ~M0V (B)
- B−V color index: +0.588
- J−H color index: +0.484
- J−K color index: +0.569

Astrometry
Radial velocity (R_{v})	25.72±0.01 km/s
Proper motion (μ)	RA: 366.090 mas/yr Dec.: 369.815 mas/yr
Parallax (π)	44.5963±0.3470 mas
Distance	73.1 ± 0.6 ly (22.4 ± 0.2 pc)
Absolute magnitude (M_{V})	3.69 (combined)

Orbit
Primary	HD 14214 A
Name	HD 14214 B
Period (P)	93.2874±0.0006 d
Semi-major axis (a)	(21.05±0.01)×10^{6} km (minimum)
Eccentricity (e)	0.5217±0.0002
Inclination (i)	105.1±3.5°
Longitude of the node (Ω)	281.0±3.1°
Periastron epoch (T)	54094.633±0.005
Argument of periastron (ω) (secondary)	103.87±0.03°

Details

HD 14214 A
Mass	1.15, 1.20 M_{☉}
Radius	1.64±0.07 R_{☉}
Luminosity	2.76 L_{☉}
Temperature	6032±23 K
Metallicity [Fe/H]	0.021±0.001 dex
Rotational velocity (v sin i)	2.1±1 km/s
Age	4.56, 4.47 Gyr

HD 14214 B
Mass	0.53 M_{☉}
Radius	0.4 R_{☉}
Luminosity	0.04 L_{☉}

Other designations
- 232 G. Ceti, AG+01°242, BD+01°410, GC 2770, HD 14214, HIP 10723, HR 672, SAO 110456, PPM 145462, TIC 419994887, TYC 38-1343-1, 2MASS J02180145+0145282, WISEA J021801.69+014531.9, Gaia DR3 2513664248895784192

Database references
SIMBAD	HD 14214

HD 14214 is a binary star in the constellation of Cetus. With an apparent magnitude of 5.60, it can be faintly seen by the naked eye from Earth as a yellow-hued dot of light. As such, it is listed in the Bright Star Catalogue as HR 672. It is located at a distance of approximately 73.1 light-years (22.4 parsecs) according to Gaia DR3 parallax measurements.

== Properties ==
This star system can be described as a single-lined (SB1) spectroscopic binary, a visual binary, and an interferometric binary. This is unusual in that weak-lined field dwarfs have a small chance (5-15 %) of being in binary systems (though HD 14214 A is now considered to be a subgiant rather than a dwarf). The two stars orbit each other in a fairly elliptical (eccentricity 0.5217) orbit every 93.2874 days.

The primary star is a subgiant, a star that has fused all the hydrogen in its core into helium and evolved past the main sequence, with the spectral type G0IV or G0.5IVb (the "b" suffix in the latter indicates that it is slightly less luminous than a typical G0.5IV subgiant). It is slightly hotter and more massive than the Sun, but 64% larger and 2.76 times as luminous. It has an age of about 4.5 billion years, similar to the age of the Solar System.

The secondary star, whose spectra cannot be directly observed, is likely a red dwarf, with the spectral type M0V, a little over half the mass of the Sun, and 40% the radius, but only radiates 4% the luminosity from its photosphere.

== Nearby objects ==
It appears very close in the sky to PKS 0215+015, a BL Lacertae object with a resting apparent magnitude of 18.3 in the V band. Anti-blooming techniques have been devised in order to counter severe blooming caused by the far brighter HD 14214 during photometric observations of the object.

== See also ==
- List of star systems within 70–75 light-years
