= K2-33 =

Star in the constellation Scorpius

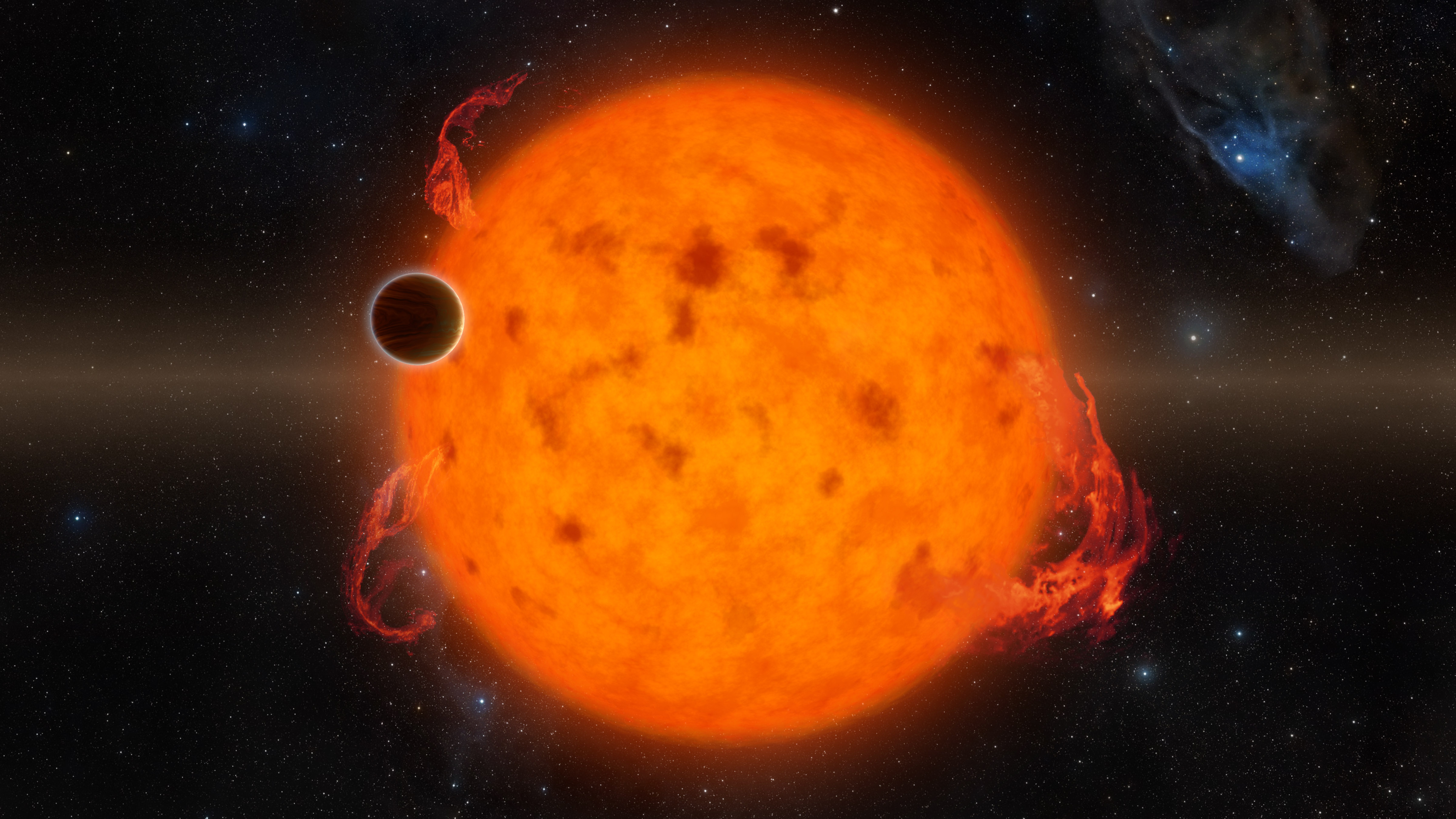
- Artist's impression of K2-33, with its planet K2-33b transiting across its surface.

Observation data Epoch J2000 Equinox ICRS
- Constellation: Scorpius
- Right ascension: 16^{h} 10^{m} 14.7377^{s}
- Declination: −19° 19′ 09.408″
- Apparent magnitude (V): 14.3

Characteristics
- Evolutionary stage: Pre-main-sequence
- Spectral type: M2

Astrometry
Proper motion (μ)	RA: −9.592(28) mas/yr Dec.: −23.964(21) mas/yr
Parallax (π)	7.1929±0.0234 mas
Distance	453 ± 1 ly (139.0 ± 0.5 pc)

Details
Mass	0.56 ± 0.09 M_{☉}
Radius	1.05 ± 0.07 R_{☉}
Temperature	3540 ± 70 K
Metallicity [Fe/H]	0 dex
Age	9.3 ± 1.2 Myr

Other designations
- EPIC 205117205, 2MASS J16101473-1919095, WISE J161014.73-191909.6

Database references
SIMBAD	data

K2-33 is an extremely young pre-main-sequence star located about 453 light-years (139 pc) away from the Earth in the constellation of Scorpius. It is known to host one planet, a super-Neptune, named K2-33b. It is also notable for its young age.

== Nomenclature and history ==
K2-33 also has the 2MASS catalogue number J16101473-1919095 and EPIC designation 205117205.

Planetary candidates were detected around the star by NASA's Kepler Mission on its K2 mission, a mission tasked with discovering planets in transit around their stars. The transit method that Kepler uses involves detecting dips in brightness in stars. These dips in brightness can be interpreted as planets whose orbits pass in front of their stars from the perspective of Earth, although other phenomenon can also be responsible which is why the term planetary candidate is used.

Following the acceptance of the discovery paper, the Kepler team provided an additional moniker for the system of "K2-33". The discoverers referred to the star as K2-33, which is the normal procedure for naming the exoplanets discovered by the spacecraft. Hence, this is the name used by the public to refer to the star and its planet.

Candidate planets that are associated with stars studied by the Kepler Mission are assigned the designations ".01" etc. after the star's name, in the order of discovery. If planet candidates are detected simultaneously, then the ordering follows the order of orbital periods from shortest to longest. Following these rules, there was only one candidate planet were detected, with an orbital period of 5.424865 days.

The designation of b is given to the first planet orbiting a given star, followed by the other letters of the alphabet. In the case of K2-33, there was only one planet, so only the letter b are used. The name K2-33 derives directly from the fact that the star is the catalogued 33rd star discovered by K2 to have confirmed planets.

== Stellar characteristics ==
This star was identified as a young pre-main-sequence object that belongs to the Upper Scorpius subgroup of the Scorpius–Centaurus association in a 2001 article, based on its high lithium content and position in the HR diagram. This is the nearest OB association and recent massive star formation region, with the Upper Scorpius subgroup having a mean distance of 140 parsecs (470 light-years). Direct parallax measurements, by the Gaia spacecraft, indicate that K2-33 is at a distance of 139 ± 0.5 pc, consistent with association to Upper Scorpius. The age of this subgroup is estimated at 11 ± 2 million years, while evolutionary models estimate to K2-33 an independent age of 9.3 million years.

K2-33's spectrum is best modelled with a spectral type of M3.3 and a visual extinction of 0.75 magnitudes, so the star can be considered to be a red dwarf. Its effective temperature has been measured at 3,540 K, which together with the apparent brightness of the star indicates a luminosity of 0.15 times the solar luminosity and a radius of 1.05 times the solar radius. This large size is typical of young stars and indicates that the star is still in the process of contracting towards the main sequence. The mass of this star is not known accurately, and has been estimated at 0.56 or 0.31 times the solar mass. The metallicity of K2-33 is consistent with being equal to the solar value ([Fe/H] = 0).

As a young star, K2-33 has a fast rotation, with a projected rotational velocity of 8.2 km/s. The rotation period of the star, 6.3 days, is known from the light curve obtained by the Kepler spacecraft, causing periodic variations of about 2% in the brightness of the star as star spots appear and disappear from Earth's line of sight. This stellar variability was removed for the analysis of the transit signal of the planet K2-33b.

K2-33 is almost certainly not a binary star. Radial velocity data obtained by the HIRES spectrograph, in the Keck I Telescope, do not show an acceleration larger than 2.6 km/s/yr, which excludes objects more massive than 0.14 solar masses at 3 astronomical units (AU) or closer. Adaptive optics infrared observations by the NIRC2 imager, in the Keck II Telescope, can exclude companions more massive than 19 Jupiter masses at 3 AU or further, and 11–12 Jupiter masses at 6–23 AU. The combination of both observational limits only allows for the existence of brown dwarfs or very low mass stars at separations of 1–3 AU.

== Planetary system ==
The K2-33 planetary system
Companion (in order from star)	Mass	Semimajor axis (AU)	Orbital period (days)	Eccentricity	Inclination (°)	Radius
b	<3.7 M_{J}	0.0409 ^{+0.0021}_{−0.0023}	5.424865+0.000035 −0.000031	—	89.1 ^{+0.6}_{−1.1}	5.04+0.34 −0.37 R_{🜨}
Debris disk	? AU				~90°	—

The only known planet transits the star; this means that the planet's orbit appear to cross in front of their star as viewed from the Earth's perspective. Its inclination relative to Earth's line of sight, or how far above or below the plane of sight it is, vary by less than one degree. This allows direct measurements of the planet's periods and relative diameters (compared to the host star) by monitoring the planet's transit of the star.

K2-33b is known remarkably for its extremely young age, only one other planet is younger (V830 Tau b), with an age of around 2 million years, while K2-33b is only 9.3 million years old. Nonetheless, it is quite a discovery in the search of exoplanets.

Infrared measurements by the Spitzer Space Telescope show that there is still a disk of planetary debris, indicating that planet formation may not be finished yet.
