= HD 63433 d =

Exoplanet orbiting G-type star HD 63433

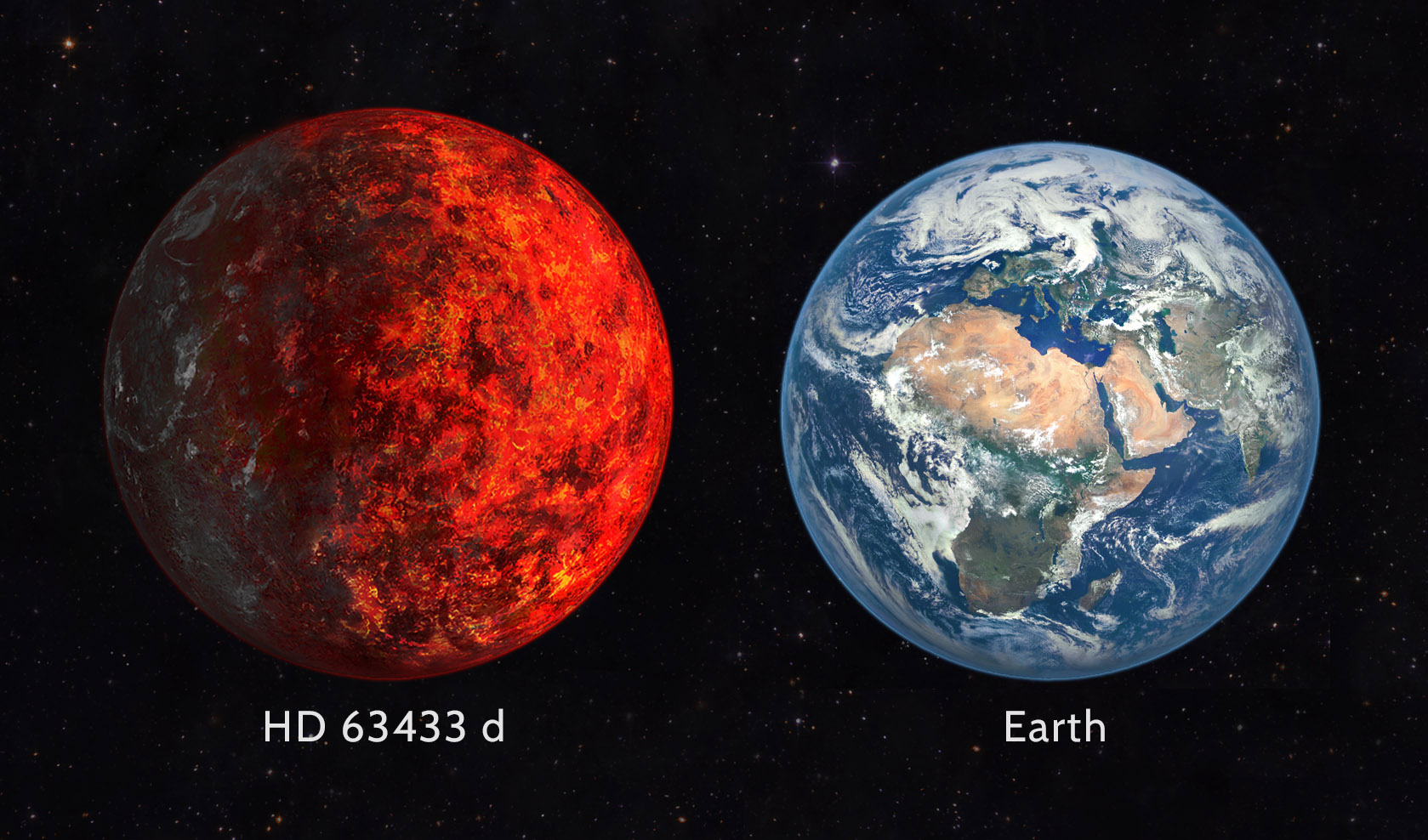
- Artist's impression of HD 63433 d as compared with Earth

Discovery
- Discovered by: Capistrant, Soares-Furtado et al. (THYME)
- Discovery date: 10 January 2024
- Detection method: Transit

Designations
- Alternative names: TOI-1726 d, BD+27 1490 d, HIP 38228 d, V377 Geminorum d

Orbital characteristics
- Semi-major axis: 0.0503+0.0025 −0.0027 AU
- Eccentricity: 0.16+0.36 −0.12
- Orbital period (sidereal): 4.20975+0.000012 −0.000023 d
- Inclination: 88.73°+0.85° −1.06°
- Star: HD 63433

Physical characteristics
- Mean radius: 1.073+0.046 −0.044 R_{🜨}
- Temperature: 1040±40 K (767 ± 40°C) (mean), (Note: Assuming an albedo of 0.3) 1,530 K (1,260 °C) (daytime) (Note: Assuming an albedo of 0, similar to the measured albedo of TRAPPIST-1b.)

HD 63433 d (TOI-1726 d) is a confirmed exoplanet orbiting HD 63433, a Sun-like star located 73 light-years away in the constellation Gemini. Its radius is measured at around 1.1 R_{🜨}, which makes it similar to the Earth in size. It was the third (and most recent) exoplanet to be discovered in orbit around this star; the other two, HD 63433 b and c, were discovered in 2020. Orbiting its star at a distance of 0.0503 astronomical units (7,520,000 km), HD 63433 d is the innermost planet orbiting HD 63433, and completes an orbit around it just every 4 days. Due to the proximity of its star, the planet is scorching hot, having a temperature estimated at 1260 °C at daytime. The proximity of its star also causes it to be tidally locked.

== Physical characteristics ==
Having a radius of 1.073 R_{🜨} (~6,845 km), it is roughly the size of Earth, but its mass is still unknown. HD 63433 d is the innermost planet in the system, orbiting its star at a distance of 0.0503 astronomical units (7,520,000 km) and completing one orbital period around it every 4 days and 5 hours. The proximity of its star causes HD 63433 d to be scorching hot, having a daytime temperature estimated at 1,260 °C (2,300 °F), which is similar to other lava planets such as Kepler-10b and CoRoT-7b, and hot enough to melt all minerals on its surface. In addition, the planet is tidally locked, meaning that one side of the planet always faces its star, while the other side always faces away from it, and it possibly lacks a substantial atmosphere. Tidal locking also happens with the Moon, which has one side always facing Earth.

It is believed that its dayside, always facing its star due to tidal locking, is completely molten and dominated by lava, in addition to possibly having volcanic activity. Meanwhile, the night side of the planet could be as cold as Pluto, having glaciers of frozen nitrogen, depending on its composition.

With an age estimated at 414 million years, it is the smallest known exoplanet less than 500 million years old, and the nearest Earth-sized planet this young.

== Importance ==
The small size, young age and the proximity of its star make HD 63433 an interesting planet for further exploration. According to the HD 63433 d discovery team, this planet and another young terrestrial planets are critical test beds to constrain the current theories of planetary formation and evolution. The study of HD 63433 d could produce valuable information about the formation and evolution of Earth-sized planets.

== Discovery ==
The planet was discovered by a team of scientists led by Benjamin Capistrant and Melinda Soares-Furtado after analyzing a transit observation made by the Transiting Exoplanet Survey Satellite (TESS). The team took the data and removed the transit signals of the other planets, thus revealing an additional transit signal that reappeared every 4.2 days. Later investigations validated that this transit signal was from a third planet around the star HD 63433. The discovery was announced on January 10, 2023, in The Astrophysical Journal.

The discovery of HD 63433 d is part of a project called TESS Hunt for Young and Maturing Exoplanets (THYME), which seeks to discover young transiting exoplanets in moving groups, stellar associations and open clusters.

== Host star ==
The host star of HD 63433 d is HD 63433, a G-type main-sequence star which is located 73 light-years away in the Gemini constellation. Having a radius 91% similar to that of the Sun, and a mass 99% similar, HD 63433 has properties very similar to those of the Sun, being classified as a solar analog. With an apparent magnitude of 6.9, the star cannot be been with the naked eye, but can be with a small telescope or binoculars. HD 63433 is part of the Ursa Major moving group, which makes its age estimated at 414 million years. Other stars located in this group include Alioth and Mizar, located in the Big Dipper.

HD 63433 also hosts two other exoplanets: HD 63433 b and c, two mini-Neptune planets discovered in 2020 by Mann et al.

== See also ==
- Lava planet
- Kepler-10b, CoRoT-7b and Kepler-20e
- HD 63433
- Transiting Exoplanet Survey Satellite
- List of exoplanets discovered in 2024
- Methods of detecting exoplanets
