= IRAS 04125+2902 b =

Young exoplanet orbiting a protostar

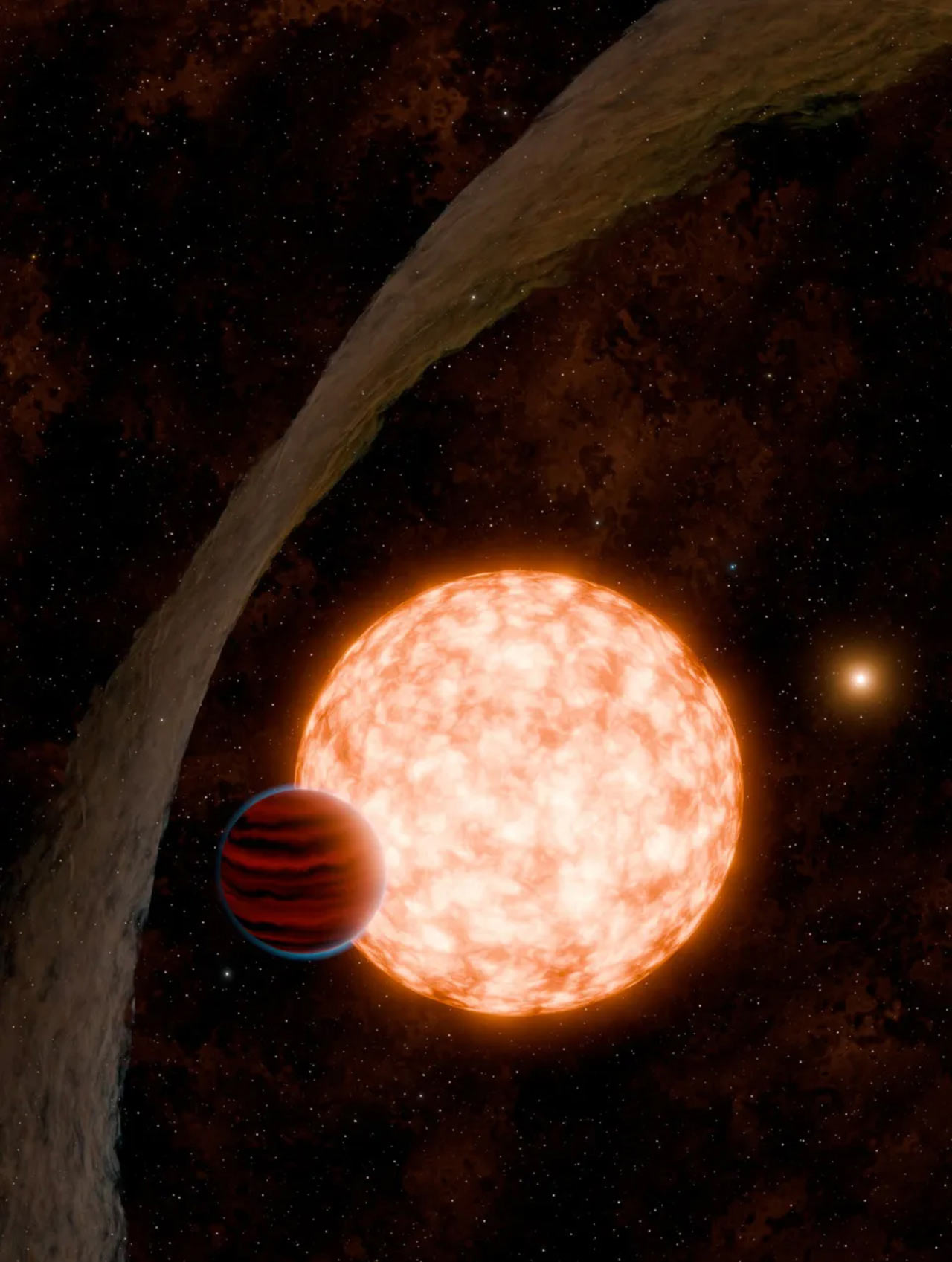
- Artist's impression of IRAS 04125+2902 b (foreground) transiting its host star, with its distant companion star visible in the background.

Discovery
- Discovered by: Madyson Barber et al.
- Discovery date: November 20, 2024
- Detection method: Transit

Designations
- Alternative names: TIDYE-1b

Orbital characteristics
- Semi-major axis: 0.077+0.0069 −0.0100 AU
- Orbital period (sidereal): 8.834978(28) days
- Inclination: 88.3°+1.2° −1.6°
- Star: IRAS 04125+2902

Physical characteristics
- Mean radius: 0.958+0.077 −0.075 R_{J}
- Mass: <0.3 M_{J} (<90 M_{🜨})
- Temperature: 854+59 −32 K

IRAS 04125+2902 b, also known as TIDYE-1b, is an extremely young exoplanet orbiting the young protostar IRAS 04125+2902 approximately 520 light-years from Earth in the constellation of Taurus. It is the youngest transiting exoplanet so far discovered, with an age of just three million years. Over time, the planet will continue to shrink as it continues consolidating material. The planet orbits its host star closely at a distance of 0.07 AU every 8.8 days.

The discovery of the exoplanet was announced on November 20, 2024, by the use of the transit method of data from the Transiting Exoplanet Survey Satellite (TESS), with the results published in the magazine Nature. It is a potential target for analyzing its atmosphere, if it has one, by the James Webb Space Telescope since it is still young and likely has an extended atmosphere.

== Discovery ==
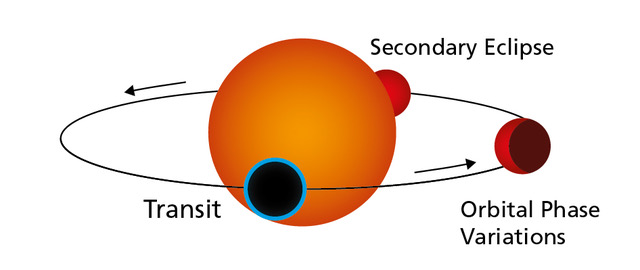
How the transit method works.

IRAS 04125+2902 b was detected using the transit method, which consists of observing small, regular dips in the brightness of the host star. These dips are planetary transits and happen when the planet passes through its host star as viewed from an observer. Data from the Transiting Exoplanet Survey Satellite was analysed by the astronomer Madyson Barber and colleagues, allowing the planet detection. After ruling out alternative explanations for the observed transit, the team was able to confirm its existence. Its discovery and confirmation was published on November 20, 2024, in the journal Nature.

=== Alternative names ===
The planet has also the nickname TIDYE-1 b, derived from the TESS Investigation – Demographics of Young Exoplanets (TIDYE) project.

== Characteristics ==
=== Mass and radius ===
The planet has a mass less than 0.3 Jupiter masses (90 Earth masses) and a radius nearly equal to that of Jupiter, just 4% smaller, or the same as 10.7 Earth radii. It is still enshrouded in a hydrogen envelope, and will shed its outer layers during its evolution, becoming either a sub-Neptune, super-Earth or a sub-Saturn. The radius would shrink to 1.5–4 R_{🜨} if the planet becomes a super-Neptune or to 4–7 R_{🜨} if it becomes a sub-Saturn. The planet likely has an extended atmosphere due to its large radius and relatively low mass, making it a potential candidate for follow-up observations with the James Webb Space Telescope.

=== Orbit ===
It has a compact orbit around its host star, completing an orbit every just 8.8 days, and semi-major axis (mean separation from the star) is just 8% of the Earth-Sun distance (astronomical unit). Its short orbit and high mass mean that it likely formed at a larger distance and then migrated to inner regions, as regions so close to the host star don't have sufficient mass to form large planets.

=== Age ===
With an age of just three million years, IRAS 04125+2902 b is the youngest transiting exoplanet so far discovered, and also one of the youngest exoplanets, only a couple of younger <13 M_{J} objects are listed in the NASA Exoplanet Archive.

== Host star ==
The host star of IRAS 04125+2902 b is IRAS 04125+2902, a T Tauri variable located at 520 light-years from Earth. It has cool effective temperature and a spectral type M1.25±0.25. Despite its cool temperature and late spectral type, this star is larger than the Sun, mostly because of its young age. IRAS 04125+2902 has a transitional disk located at 20–60 AU and makes a binary system with 2MASS J04154269+2909558, being separated by a projected distance of 635 astronomical units (9.50×10^{10} km) from its companion.

The companions and the host star's equator are aligned, but the disk is not, and the reason for the misalignment of the disk is unclear. It could be due to planetary migration in the past which misaligned the orbit of IRAS 04125+2902 b's orbit, but such a hypothesis requires the existence of another planet in the system, which has not been detected. Another hypothesis suggest that infalling material from the surrounding Taurus Molecular Cloud could be the cause of this misalignment, as those places are densely packed.

== See also ==
- V830 Tauri – Similar to IRAS 04125+2902 and has an unconfirmed planet
- K2-33b, previously the youngest transiting exoplanet
- DH Tauri b, youngest known exoplanet at 700,000 years
