= TESS Hunt for Young and Maturing Exoplanets =

Exoplanet search project

TESS Hunt for Young and Maturing Exoplanets (THYME) is an exoplanet search project. The researchers of the THYME collaboration are mainly from the United States and search for young exoplanets using data from the Transiting Exoplanet Survey Satellite (TESS). The new discoveries should help to understand the early evolution of exoplanets. As of April 2026 the collaboration has produced 14 papers announcing the discovery of exoplanets.

Paper number 8 adapted the backronym to "Transit Hunt for Young and Maturing Exoplanets", because it used data from the Kepler space telescope. As a follow-up to the K2-based Zodiacal Exoplanets In Time (ZEIT) survey, which also has a time-based name, the THYME project's name pronunciation alludes to the young age of the planets it has discovered.

== List of discoveries ==
Name	orbital period (days)	Radius (R_{🜨})	age (Myrs)	discovery year	reference
DS Tuc Ab (TOI-200.01)	8.1	5.7	45	2019	
HIP 67522 b	6.96	10.0	17	2020	
HIP 67522 c (candidate)	≥23	8.01	17	2020	
HD 63433 d	4.2	1.1	400	2024	
HD 63433 b (TOI-1726.01)	7.11	2.15	400	2020	
HD 63433 c (TOI-1726.02)	20.55	2.67	400	2020	
TOI-451 b	1.9	1.9	120	2021	
TOI-451 c	9.2	3.1	120	2021	
TOI-451 d	16	4.1	120	2021	
HD 110082 b (TOI-1098.01)	10.2	3.2	250	2021	
TOI-1227 b	27.4	9.5	11	2022	
TOI-2048 b	13.8	2.6	300	2022	
Kepler-1928 b	19.58	2.0	105	2022	
HD 109833 b (TOI-1097.01)	9.19	2.9	27	2023	
HD 109833 c (TOI-1097.02)	13.90	2.6	27	2023	
TOI-1224 b	4.18	2.10	210	2024	
TOI-1224 c	17.95	2.88	210	2024	
TOI-4364 b	5.4	2.01	710	2025	
