= DS Tucanae =

Binary star system in the constellation of Tucana

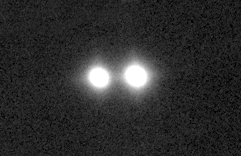
- DS Tucanae imaged with the NTT. DS Tucanae A is on the right and DS Tucanae B is on the left.

Observation data Epoch J2000.0 Equinox ICRS
- Constellation: Tucana
- DS Tucanae A
- Right ascension: 23^{h} 39^{m} 39.48081^{s}
- Declination: −69° 11′ 44.7077″
- Apparent magnitude (V): 8.47
- DS Tucanae B
- Right ascension: 23^{h} 39^{m} 39.26965^{s}
- Declination: −69° 11′ 39.4936″
- Apparent magnitude (V): 9.84

Characteristics
- Spectral type: G6V+K3V
- Variable type: RS CVn

Astrometry

A
Radial velocity (R_{v})	7.20 km/s
Proper motion (μ)	RA: 79.529 mas/yr Dec.: −67.551 mas/yr
Parallax (π)	22.6367±0.0150 mas
Distance	144.08 ± 0.10 ly (44.18 ± 0.03 pc)

B
Radial velocity (R_{v})	5.32 km/s
Proper motion (μ)	RA: 78.133 mas/yr Dec.: −65.845 mas/yr
Parallax (π)	22.6524±0.0125 mas
Distance	143.98 ± 0.08 ly (44.15 ± 0.02 pc)

Details

DS Tucanae A
Mass	1.01±0.06 M_{☉}
Radius	0.964±0.029 R_{☉}
Luminosity	0.725±0.013 L_{☉}
Temperature	5,428±80 K
Rotational velocity (v sin i)	27.75^{+1.73}_{−1.54} km/s
Age	45±4 Myr

DS Tucanae B
Mass	0.84±0.06 M_{☉}
Radius	0.864±0.036 R_{☉}
Luminosity	0.327±0.010 L_{☉}
Temperature	4,700±90 K
Age	45±4 Myr

Other designations
- DS Tuc, HD 222259, CCDM J23397-6912AB, CD−69°2106, HIP 116748, WDS J23397-6912AB, TIC 410214986, TOI 200

Database references
SIMBAD	A
- B
- Ab

DS Tucanae (HD 222259) is a binary star system 144 light years away in the constellation of Tucana. It has an apparent visual magnitude of 8.5, and is a RS Canum Venaticorum variable. The system is notable for being young as a member of the 45 Myr old Tucana-Horologium moving group and for the primary star hosting the confirmed exoplanet DS Tucanae Ab, discovered by THYME, using TESS.

== Stellar system ==
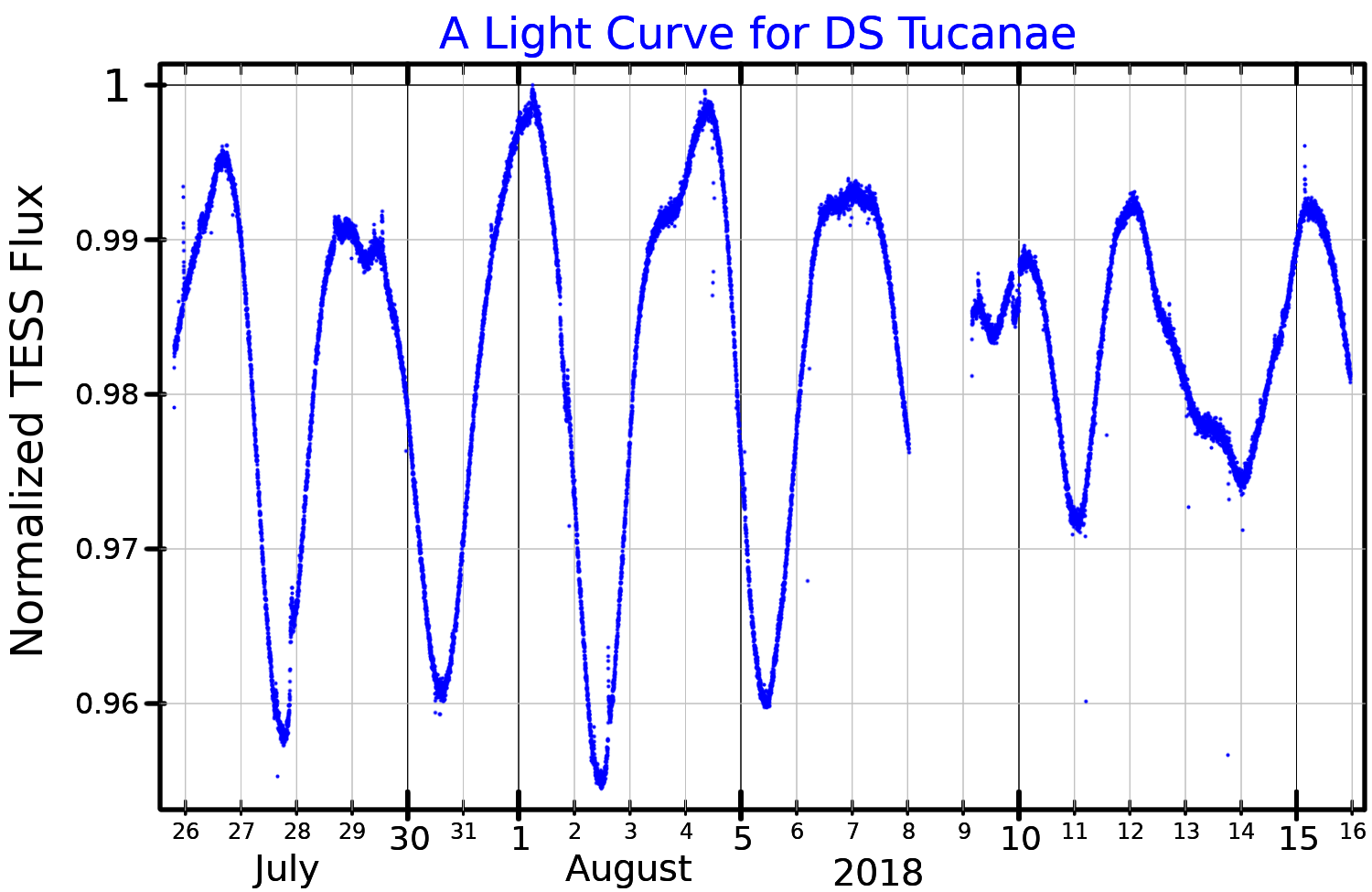
A light curve for DS Tucanae, plotted from TESS data

DS Tucanae is a visual binary. The binary consists of a G6V primary and a K3V secondary separated by 5″. Based on radial velocity measurements it was suggested that the secondary itself is a binary, but later studies could not find evidence for this claim.

Together with the red dwarf 2MASS J23321028–6926537, DS Tucanae might be a triple stellar system. This star shares a similar distance and similar proper motions. It is separated 113,000 astronomical units from DS Tuc.

== Physical properties ==
In 1996, analysis of the Hipparcos data showed that the star is variable. It was given its variable-star designation in 1999.

High levels of magnetic activity, a strong 6708Å lithium line, and the position on the color-magnitude diagram, slightly above the main sequence, strongly support a young age of the system. The primary star is emitting a frequent and powerful (up to 5-8×10^{34} ergs) X-ray flares.

Both components of the binary are main sequence stars. The primary has a mass very similar to the Sun, but slightly cooler and smaller, meaning it is only 72% as luminous as the Sun. The secondary is only 84% as massive as the Sun and only 33% as luminous.

== Planetary system ==
The DS Tuc A planetary system
Companion (in order from star)	Mass	Semimajor axis (AU)	Orbital period (days)	Eccentricity	Inclination (°)	Radius
b	<14.4 M_{🜨}	0.18+0.13 −0.12	8.138268	—	88.73^{+0.18}_{−0.17}	5.70±0.17 R_{🜨}

DS Tuc Ab is one of the few transiting planets with an age smaller than 100 Myrs. Other examples are K2-33b, V1298 Tauri b and AU Microscopii b. Of these systems DS Tuc is the brightest and it is a good target for atmospheric characterization with JWST. The planet is a super-Neptune or sub-Saturn. The planet might be an inflated planet with an upper mass limit of 20 M_{🜨}. DS Tuc Ab will be observed by ESA's CHEOPS mission to characterize the planet.

The planet DS Tucanae Ab has a low orbital obliquity (λ = 2.93°+0.88°
−0.87° or λ = 12°±13°). This means that the orbital plane of this planet aligns with the stellar equator of the star. This is unusual for a short period planet. Many short period planets show high orbital obliquity, which was taken as a sign of the scattering of the planet into this short period orbit. It can also be interpreted as the formation of a planet in an inner disk with an axial tilt. But these previous measurements of orbital obliquity were made for giant planets around mature stars. DS Tucanae Ab is a relatively small young planet. This suggests that DS Tucanae Ab formed in a smooth disk that was not perturbed by the stellar companion DS Tucanae B. DS Tucanae Ab might therefore be a good target to study in-situ planet-formation of short-period planets.
