= HIP 67522 =

G-type main-sequence star

Observation data Epoch J2000 Equinox ICRS
- Constellation: Centaurus
- Right ascension: 13^{h} 50^{m} 06.280^{s}
- Declination: −40° 50′ 08.88″
- Apparent magnitude (V): 9.80±0.03

Characteristics
- Evolutionary stage: Main sequence
- Spectral type: G0V

Astrometry
Radial velocity (R_{v})	8.26±2.19 km/s
Proper motion (μ)	RA: −28.907 mas/yr Dec.: −22.248 mas/yr
Parallax (π)	8.0170±0.0182 mas
Distance	406.8 ± 0.9 ly (124.7 ± 0.3 pc)

Details
Mass	1.22±0.05 M_{☉}
Radius	1.38±0.06 R_{☉}
Luminosity	1.75±0.09 L_{☉}
Temperature	5,675±75 K
Rotation	1.418±0.016 days
Rotational velocity (v sin i)	54.2±0.7 km/s
Age	17±2 Myr

Other designations
- CD−40 8189, HD 120411, HIP 67522, TOI-6551, TIC 166527623

Database references
SIMBAD	data
Exoplanet Archive	data

HIP 67522 is a G-type main sequence star located at a distance of 407 light-years (125 parsecs) away in the constellation of Centaurus. Its visual magnitude of 9.8 makes it much too faint to be seen by the unaided eye. It is slightly larger than the Sun (1.38 R_{☉}) but cooler (5,675 K versus 5,772 K for the Sun). It is also very young being only around 17 million years old. It has two exoplanets orbiting it.

== Planetary system ==
Two exoplanets, HIP 67522 b and HIP 67522 c, are known to orbit the star and transit its face as seen from Earth. Their orbital periods are much less than Mercury's 88 days around the Sun, being 6.96 days for b and 14.33 days for c.

Detections of frequent flaring of the star during the transit phase of the innermost planet (HIP 67522b) suggest that interacts with the stars magnetic field producing the high rate of flares.

The HIP 67522 planetary system
Companion (in order from star)	Mass	Semimajor axis (AU)	Orbital period (days)	Eccentricity	Inclination (°)	Radius
b	0.0434±0.0031 M_{J}	0.0748+0.0016 −0.0018	6.9594731(22)	0.064+0.187 −0.049	89.88+1.08 −0.93	0.891+0.021 −0.02 R_{J}
c	—	0.1228+0.0042 −0.0053	14.334892(12)	0.077+0.195 −0.056	89.2+1.75 −0.64	0.708+0.031 −0.032 R_{J}
