= HD 159062 =

Spectroscopic binary in the constellation Hercules

- Location of HD 159062 (circled)

Observation data Epoch J2000 Equinox ICRS
- Constellation: Hercules
- Right ascension: 17^{h} 30^{m} 16.42797^{s}
- Declination: +47° 24′ 07.9010″
- Apparent magnitude (V): 7.305

Characteristics
- Evolutionary stage: main sequence
- Spectral type: G9V Fe−0.8
- B−V color index: +0.830
- J−H color index: +0.338
- J−K color index: +0.412

Astrometry
Radial velocity (R_{v})	−83.98 km/s
Proper motion (μ)	RA: 169.814 mas/yr Dec.: 77.133 mas/yr
Parallax (π)	46.1856±0.0042 mas
Distance	70.619 ± 0.006 ly (21.652 ± 0.002 pc)
Absolute magnitude (M_{V})	5.48

Orbit
Primary	HD 159062 A
Name	HD 159062 B
Period (P)	411+71 −70 yr
Semi-major axis (a)	2.860+0.320 −0.330" (61.9+7.0 −7.2 AU)
Eccentricity (e)	0.102+0.11 −0.065
Inclination (i)	63.0+1.8 −2.4°
Longitude of the node (Ω)	133.4+1.7 −1.3°
Periastron epoch (T)	2507000+16000 −31000
Argument of periastron (ω) (secondary)	260+70 −76°

Details

HD 159062 A
Mass	0.80±0.05 M_{☉}
Radius	0.76±0.04 R_{☉}
Surface gravity (log g)	4.4±0.1 cgs
Temperature	5283±100 K
Metallicity [Fe/H]	−0.31±0.06 dex
Rotational velocity (v sin i)	2.06±0.5 km/s
Age	~9–13 Gyr

HD 159062 B
Mass	0.6083+0.0083 −0.0073 M_{☉}
Temperature	4580+440 −160 K
Age	cooling age: 8+3 −5 Gyr

Other designations
- AG+47°1251, BD+47°2491, GC 23733, GJ 4010, HD 159062, HIP 85653, SAO 46762, PPM 56246, WDS J17303+4724A, LSPM J1730+4724, NLTT 44958, TIC 270258076, TYC 3513-1056-1, GSC 03513-01056, IRAS 17289+4726, 2MASS J17301639+4724078, WISEA J173016.61+472408.6, Gaia DR3 1362295082910131200, USNO-B1.0 1374-00341178

Database references
SIMBAD	HD 159062

HD 159062 is a spectroscopic binary consisting of a Sun-like star and a white dwarf positioned in the northern constellation of Hercules. With an apparent magnitude of 7.305, it is too faint to be seen by the naked eye but is readily visible via binoculars. It is located at a distance of 70.619 light-years (21.652 parsecs) according to parallax calculations, and is approaching the Solar System at a heliocentric radial velocity of −83.980 km/s.

== Stellar properties ==
The primary star, designated HD 159062 A, is a G-type main-sequence star slightly cooler than the Sun with 80% the mass and 76% the radius. It has the spectral type G9V Fe−0.8, where the "Fe−0.8" suffix indicates a slight but anomalous deficiency of metals like iron. Indeed, it has a low metallicity of [Fe/H]=−0.31±0.06 dex. The star is thought to be ancient, somewhere between 9-13 billion years old, and has been marked as a population II star and a candidate blue straggler. It rotates on its axis at roughly 2 km/s, about the same as the Sun's equatorial rotational velocity (1.997 km/s).

Based on stellar kinematics, it is very likely (88% probability) a part of the thick disk population, and has been measured to have a europium abundance typical of thick disk stars. However, it is highly enhanced in s-process elements, such as barium, lanthanum, and cerium. Fuhrmann et al. (2017) noted that the barium overabundance is particularly extreme at [Ba/Fe]=0.40 dex, which they argued was almost certainly the result of stellar wind accretion from a distant (orbital period 10-1,000 years) former asymptotic giant branch primary, which would have shriveled up into a cool white dwarf companion.

As predicted, a white dwarf, HD 159062 B, was discovered in 2019 by Hirsch et al. in a near-circular orbit around HD 159062 A at a distance of approximately 62 AU with a period of 411 years. The low eccentricity and large separation of the orbit implies that a Roche lobe overflow never took place. It was once a ~1.5 M_{☉} star, whose lifespan came to an end roughly 8 billion years ago and has been radiating away heat as a stellar remnant ever since. It has now cooled to an effective temperature of 4,580 K (4,310 °C; 7,780 °F). Its mass, together with its orbital parameters, was determined precisely using a Python script devised in 2021.

== See also ==
- List of star systems within 70–75 light-years
