= HD 12039 =

G-type star in the constellation Cetus

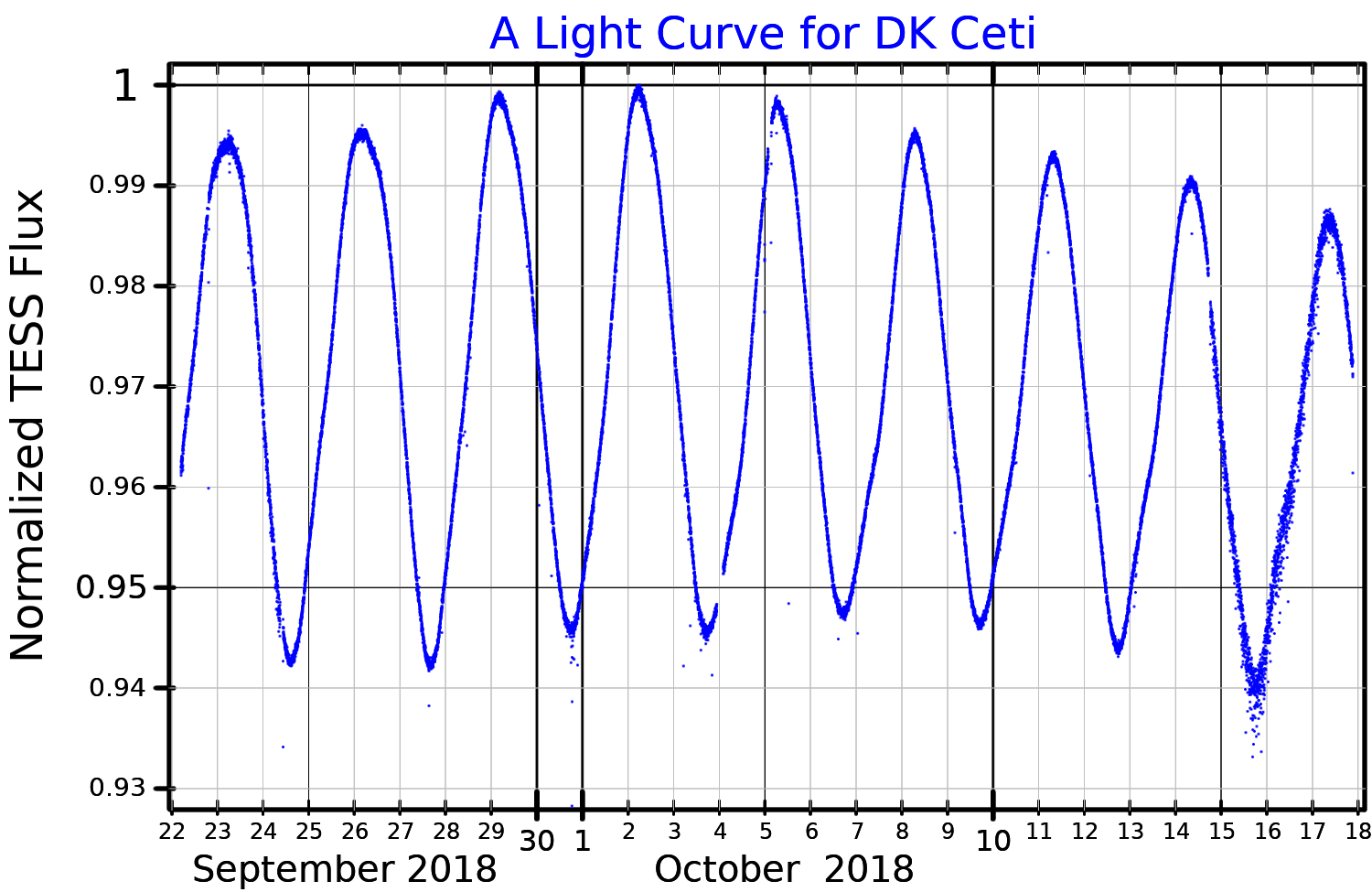
- A light curve for DK Ceti, plotted from TESS data

Observation data Epoch J2000 Equinox ICRS
- Constellation: Cetus
- Right ascension: 01^{h} 57^{m} 48.97759^{s}
- Declination: −21° 54′ 05.3411″
- Apparent magnitude (V): 8.00

Characteristics
- Evolutionary stage: main sequence
- Spectral type: G4V
- Variable type: BY Dra

Astrometry
Radial velocity (R_{v})	+5.7±0.3 km/s
Proper motion (μ)	RA: +103.633 mas/yr Dec.: −50.437 mas/yr
Parallax (π)	24.2053±0.0243 mas
Distance	134.7 ± 0.1 ly (41.31 ± 0.04 pc)
Absolute magnitude (M_{V})	5.03

Details
Mass	1.02 M_{☉}
Radius	1.0 R_{☉}
Luminosity	0.89 L_{☉}
Surface gravity (log g)	4.39 cgs
Temperature	5,585 K
Metallicity [Fe/H]	−0.28 dex
Rotational velocity (v sin i)	15.2 km/s
Age	7.5−8 Myr

Other designations
- DK Cet, CD−22°656, HD 12039, SAO 167434, HIP 9141

Database references
SIMBAD	data

HD 12039, also known as DK Ceti, is a variable star in the constellation of Cetus at a distance of 135 ly (41 pc). It is categorized as a BY Draconis variable because of luminosity changes caused by surface magnetic activity coupled with rotation of the star. The stellar classification G4V is similar to the Sun, indicating this is a main sequence star that is generating energy at its core through the thermonuclear fusion of hydrogen. The effective temperature of 5,585 K gives the star a yellow hue. It has about the same mass as the Sun, but only emits 89% of the Sun's luminosity. This is a young star with age estimates ranging from 7.5−8 million years to 30 million years.

HD 12039 was discovered to be a variable star when the Hipparcos data was analyzed. It was given its variable star designation, DK Ceti, in 1999.

In 2006, a debris field was discovered in orbit around this star using infrared observations by the Spitzer Space Telescope. This debris is thought to be an asteroid belt. The measured temperature of the debris is 110 K, which places it in an orbit between 4 and 6 AU from the star, or about the same distance where Jupiter orbits the Sun. This debris disk may have been created by the breakup of a single, 100 km diameter planetesimal through a collision. The star system does not show any excess emission at 70 μm, indicating it does not have a cold outer dust disk.

The star was examined for the presence of an extrasolar planet with a mass in the range 2-10 Jupiter masses and an orbital distance of 3-15.5 AU. Instead, in 2007, a close stellar companion was likely discovered. This object is separated from the primary by 0.15 arcseconds, making it unlikely to be a background object.

This star has been proposed as a member of the Tucana-Horologium association (Tuc-Hor), a stream of young stars with a common motion through space. The Tuc-Hor association is about 30 million years old. The space velocity components of this star are [U, V, W] = [−0.6, −16.3, 5.0] km/s. It is orbiting the Milky Way galaxy with an orbital eccentricity of 0.06, with a distance that varies from 7.11−8.01 kpc of the galactic core. The inclination of its orbit carries it as far as 90 parsecs above the galactic plane.

== See also ==
- "Spitzer Team Says Debris Disk Could Be Forming Infant Terrestrial Planets". Jet Propulsion Laboratory/Space Science Institute. December 14, 2005.
