= HD 63433 c =

Mini-Neptune orbiting the Sun-like star HD 63433

Discovery
- Discovered by: Mann et al. (THYME)
- Discovery date: 30 April 2020
- Detection method: Transit

Designations
- Alternative names: TOI-1726 c, BD+27 1490 c, HIP 38228 c, V377 Geminorum c

Orbital characteristics
- Semi-major axis: 0.1448+0.0073 −0.0077 AU
- Eccentricity: 0.21+0.33 −0.14
- Orbital period (sidereal): 20.54 days
- Inclination: 89.28°+0.4° −0.22°
- Star: HD 63433

Physical characteristics
- Mean radius: 2.692±0.108 R_{🜨}
- Mass: 15.54±3.86 M_{🜨}
- Mean density: 4.6±1.3 g/cm^{3}
- Temperature: T_{eq}: 540+10 −9 (Note: Assuming an albedo of 0.6) — 679+13 −11 K (Note: Assuming an albedo of 0)

HD 63433 c (TOI-1726 c) is a mini-Neptune exoplanet orbiting the Sun-like star HD 63433. It is the outermost planet in its planetary system, being located 0.1448 astronomical units (21,660,000 km) from its star, and completing one orbit every 21 days. Despite being the outermost planet in the system, it is still located close to its star, meaning that its temperature is hot, being estimated between 267 and 406 °C. HD 63433 c is about 2.7 times larger than Earth and 15.5 times more massive, but still smaller and less massive than Neptune. (Note: Neptune is 3.883 times larger than Earth, and 17.15 times more massive.) In 2022, a study showed that its atmosphere, made up of hydrogen, is being evaporated by the strong radiation from its star, causing it to slowly turn into a super-Earth planet.

== Characteristics ==
HD 63433 c is classified as a mini-Neptune planet, a class of planets that are smaller than Neptune but still have an atmosphere of hydrogen and/or helium, just like Neptune. According to theoretical models, its composition is mainly of silicate and water, surrounded by a gaseous envelope that makes up about 2% of the planet. HD 63433 c is 2.7 times larger than Earth, but still 1/3 smaller than the Solar System's ice giants, Neptune and Uranus. (Note: The radius of Neptune and Uranus are 3.883 R_{🜨} and 4.007 R_{🜨} respectively.) Its mass is about 15.5 M_{🜨}, being situated between the masses of Uranus and Neptune, which are 14.54 and 17.15 M_{🜨} respectively. The density of HD 63433 c is calculated at 4.6 g/cm^{3}, slightly lower than Earth's, (Note: The density of Earth is 5.513 g/cm^{3}.) but higher than the densities of Neptune and Uranus. (Note: The densities of Neptune and Uranus are 1.638 g/cm^{3} and 1.27 g/cm^{3} respectively.) The age of the planet is estimated at 400 million years.

It is the outermost planet in its planetary system, orbiting its star at a distance of 0.145 astronomical units (21,700,000 km), with an orbital period of 21 days. Despite being the outermost planet, its distance is about 37% of Mercury's distance from the Sun, (Note: The distance of Mercury to the Sun is 0.387 AU.) in addition to having a high temperature, estimated between 267 and 406 degrees Celsius. (Note: Assuming albedos of 0.6 and 0 respectively.)

Size comparison
Neptune	HD 63433 c
Neptune	Exoplanet

The discovery of HD 63433 c, as well as all planets orbiting HD 63433, is part of a project called TESS Hunt for Young and Maturing Exoplanets (THYME), whose objective is to discover transiting exoplanets in stellar associations, moving groups and open clusters. It was discovered in 2020 by Mann et al., using the Transiting Exoplanet Survey Satellite (TESS), together with HD 63433 b. Both planets were discovered through the transit method.

== Evaporating atmosphere ==
In 2022, a study led by Michael Zhang observed two mini-Neptunes from distinct planetary systems: HD 63433 c, using the Hubble Space Telescope, and TOI-560.01, using the W. M. Keck Observatory. This study revealed that the atmospheres of the two planets – made up mainly of hydrogen (HD 63433 c) and helium (TOI-560.01) – are evaporating and transforming them into super-Earths, as the strong radiation of their host stars is slowly stripping away their puffy atmospheres, causing them to escape into space, like a hot air balloon. In HD 63433 c in particular, these gases are escaping at a speed of 50 km/s, and forming a gas cocoon 12 times larger than the planet itself.

The same effect was not identified on the sibling planet HD 63433 b, which could indicate that it has already lost its primordial atmosphere.

== Host star ==
The host star of HD 63433 c is HD 63433, a G-type main-sequence star that is located 73 light-years from Earth in the constellation Gemini. (Note: Obtained with a right ascension of 07^{h} 49^{m} 55.06^{s} and a declination of 27° 21′ 47.5″ on this website.) The properties of this star, such as its radius (0.912 R_{☉}) and its mass (0.99 M_{☉}) are very similar to those of the Sun, which makes it classified as a Solar analog. The star is part of the Ursa Major moving group, allowing its age to be estimated at 414±23 million years. There are other exoplanets orbiting this star, HD 63433 b, also a mini-Neptune, and HD 63433 d, an Earth-sized planet.

== See also ==
- GJ 3470 b
- Atmospheric escape
- List of exoplanets discovered in 2020
