= IRAS 04125+2902 =

T Tauri star in the constellation Taurus

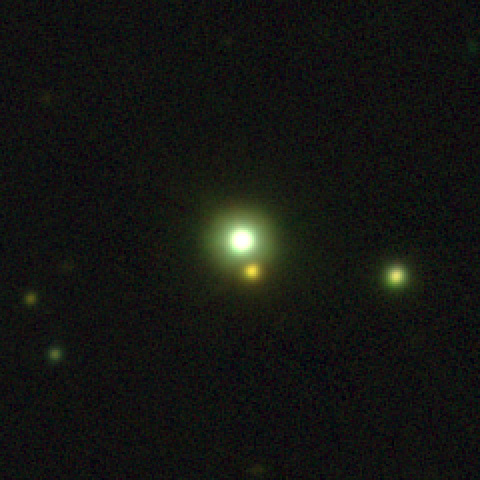
- IRAS 04125+2902 (green star in the middle) and its companion (yellow star below); Credit: Pan-STARRS & Meli thev

Observation data Epoch J2000 Equinox J2000
- Constellation: Taurus
- Right ascension: 04^{h} 15^{m} 42.7871^{s}
- Declination: +29° 09′ 59.832″
- Apparent magnitude (V): 15.487±0.003

Characteristics
- Evolutionary stage: pre main sequence
- Spectral type: M1.25±0.25 + M6.5
- Variable type: T Tauri

Astrometry
Radial velocity (R_{v})	13.35±0.39 km/s
Proper motion (μ)	RA: +21.811 mas/yr Dec.: −18.145 mas/yr
Parallax (π)	6.2474±0.0270 mas
Distance	522 ± 2 ly (160.1 ± 0.7 pc)

Details

Primary
Mass	0.70±0.04 M_{☉}
Radius	1.45±0.1 R_{☉}
Luminosity	0.466±0.041 L_{☉}
Temperature	4,080±95 K
Rotation	11.31±0.06 d
Rotational velocity (v sin i)	7.1±0.5 km/s
Age	3.3+0.6 −0.5 Myr

Companion
Mass	0.17±0.04 M_{☉}
Radius	0.96±0.12 R_{☉}
Luminosity	0.050±0.004 L_{☉}
Temperature	2,830±90 K

Other designations
- TIC 56658270, IRAS 04125+2902, 2MASS J04154278+2909597, WISE J041542.77+290959.5

Database references
SIMBAD	data

IRAS 04125+2902 is an M-type star and a T Tauri variable located in the Taurus Molecular Cloud, 160 parsecs (520 light-years) from Earth. This young protostar has 70% of the Sun's mass, 1.45 times the Sun's radius and an effective temperature of 4,080 K (3,810 °C; 6,880 °F). It has a very young age of three million years. It is surrounded by a transitional disk, inclined at 30° relative to Earth, and has one known exoplanet.

It is part of a binary system with 2MASS J04154269+2909558, the two being separated by a projected distance of 635 astronomical units, or 4 arcseconds in the sky. The companion was discovered in 2009, has a spectral type of M6.5, and does not show any infrared excess.

== Circumstellar disk ==
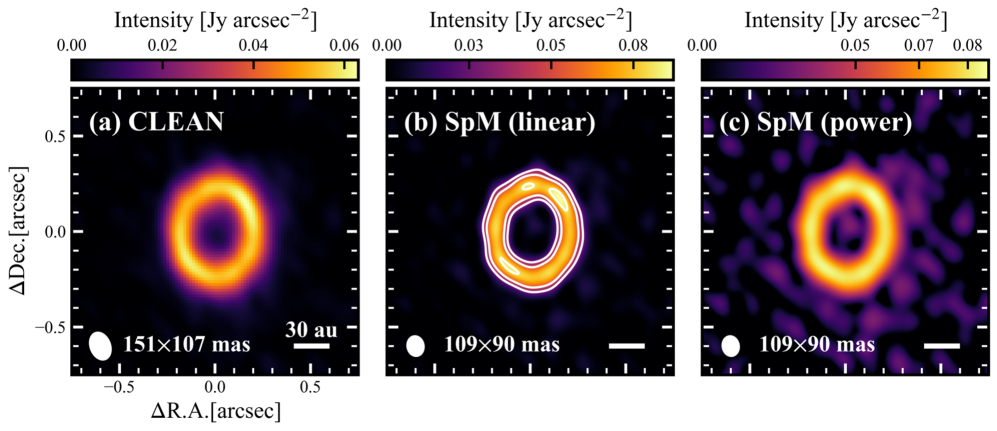
ALMA image of the dust in the disk.

The disk was first imaged with the Submillimeter Array, which found a disk radius of 50-60 AU and evidence for a narrow dust ring. The dust disk around IRAS 04125+2902 is truncated, which could be caused by disk evolution or by an eccentric companion. It is unlikely that the wide companion is responsible for the disk truncation, as its projected distance is much larger than the dust disk's outer limit, but given that the orbital eccentricity of the companion is unknown, this remains plausible.

High-resolution images of the disk were taken with ALMA. The dust continuum revealed a ring-gap transitional disk with an inclination of 35.6°. The peak emission of the ring is at a radius of around 37 – 38 AU. (Note: Measured from figure 2 left side.) Evidence for an inner disk was found, but this could also be free-free emission from the star. If the inner disk exists, the inner and outer disks are misaligned by around 10°. The ^{12}CO gas imaging revealed the rotation of the disk, which was used to estimate the mass of the star at 0.7 – 1.0 M_{☉}. The study found this system to be dynamically complex. Binary orbit, outer disk, inner disk, and planetary orbit are mutually misaligned.

The misalignment might be explained by the dissolution of an unstable triple system. A research team simulated such an ejection interaction for IRAS 01425+2902. An ejected 0.35 M_{☉} star inclines both the disk and the binary orbit, resulting in a relative misalignment of ≳60° and a highly eccentric orbit (e≳0.5) for the companion star. The planet orbit also becomes inclined relative to the disk.

== Planetary system ==
IRAS 04125+2902 hosts one confirmed exoplanet, IRAS 04125+2902 b, which has an orbital period of nine days around its star, orbiting it closely. It was discovered in 2024 using the transit method and is the youngest transiting exoplanet so far discovered. It is notable as a precursor of super-Earths or sub-Neptunes, commonly found planets. The planet is currently similar to Jupiter in size and its mass is constrained to be less than 0.3 M_{J}. Over time, it will become a sub-Saturn or sub-Neptune with 60% of its current size or less.

The outer disk is misaligned with the planet and the outer companion, which could be caused by infalling material from the Taurus molecular cloud, but this remains unclear. This misaligment also made it possible to detect IRAS 04125+2902 b via the transit method.

The IRAS 04125+2902 planetary system
Companion (in order from star)	Mass	Semimajor axis (AU)	Orbital period (days)	Eccentricity	Inclination (°)	Radius
b	<0.3 M_{J}	0.0813+0.0048 −0.0081	8.834976(24)	—	88.76+0.87 −1.0	0.97±0.057 R_{J}
Wall/Inner edge	<18 AU				20°	—
Dust disk	20–60 AU				<30°	—

== See also ==
- V830 Tauri – Similar to IRAS 04125+2902 and has an unconfirmed planet
