= Tucana–Horologium association =

Large stellar association

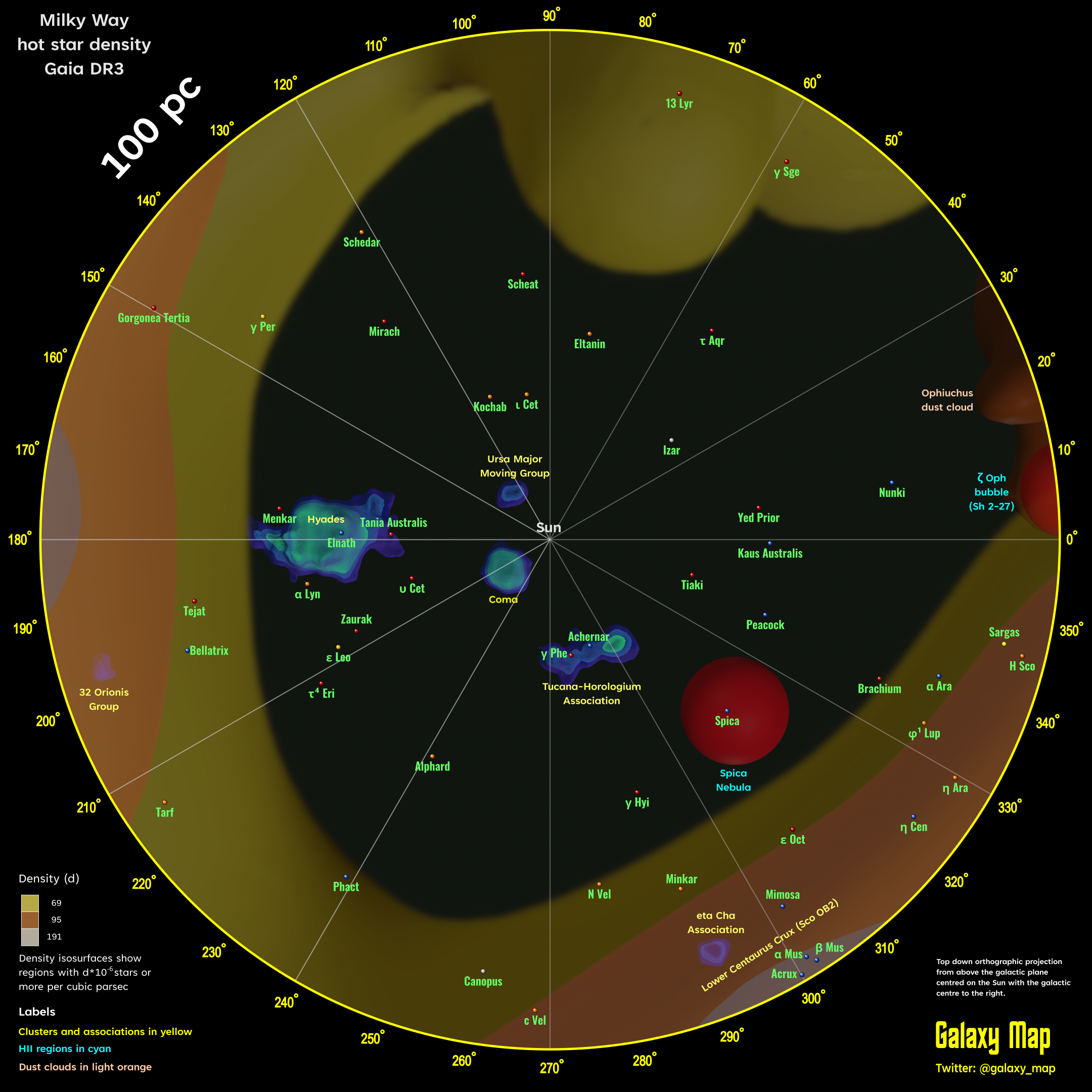
Map of stars and open clusters within 100 parsecs of the Sun. The Tucana–Horologium association is at 285° galactic longitude.

The Tucana–Horologium association (Tuc–Hor), or Tucana Horologium moving group, is a stellar association with an age of 45 ± 4 Myr and it is one of the largest stellar associations within 100 parsecs (330 light-years). The association has a similar size to the Beta Pictoris moving group (BPMG) and contains, like BPMG, more than 12 stars with spectral type B, A and F. The association is named after two southern constellations, the constellation Tucana and the constellation Horologium.

The group was at first not recognized as an individual group, but stars within the group were first assigned to the Great Austral Young Association (GAYA). Only later did it become clear that this complex is divided into three groups: the Tucana-Horologium association, the Carina association and the Columba association.

== Members ==
The members of this young group are potential targets for directly imaged circumstellar disks and exoplanets. The stars are located close to Earth and the planets are young, so they give off more infrared light, which is suited for directly imaging techniques. AB Pictoris was considered a member of Tuc-Hor, but it is more likely a member of the Carina association.

The brightest-identified member of the association is the massive star Alpha Pavonis, which is leaving the main sequence. The association also contains stars of the Beta Tucanae group. Another notable member is DS Tucanae, which is a binary star, with the primary having one exoplanet transiting in front of the star.

Debris disks have been detected around some members. Examples are HD 1466, HD 10472, DK Ceti, CPD-74 192, HD 21997, HD 32195, HD 37484, HD 38206, V1358 Orionis and HD 85672. The star HD 202917 has a debris disk that was directly imaged with the Hubble Space Telescope. The brown dwarf 2MASS J02265658-5327032 is likely a member of the Tuc–Hor association and has a circumstellar disk, which is unusual for its age. Some researchers call these relatively old disks Peter Pan disks.

Examples of directly imaged planets in the association are 2MASS 0219-3925 b and 2MASS 0103(AB) b.

The list below shows some members of the group. The list is focused on B-type, A-type and F-type stars and other stars/brown dwarfs are included if they are notable. The list is sorted after the brightness.

List of members
Name	distance (light-years)	spectral type	brightness (V-mag)
α Pavonis	179	B2IV	1.91
φ Eridani	154	B8V	3.56
ε Hydri	152	B9IV	4.12
HD 2884	135	B9V	4.36
HD 24072	172	B9.5Van	4.71
HD 2885	166	A2V	4.77
η Tucanae	154	A1Va+n	4.99
HD 3003	150	A0V	5.07
HD 24071	172	A1Va	5.25
HD 20121	139	F4V+F9V	6.01
HD 154431	181	A5V	6.07
HD 19545	177	A3V	6.18
HD 12894	151	F4V	6.45
HD 207964	152	F0IV	6.56
HD 200798	227	A5/6IV/V	6.70
HD 30051	220	F2IV	7.12
HD 24636	186	F3IV/V	7.13
HD 207575	153	F6V	7.22
HD 1466	140	F8V	7.45
HD 53842	189	F5V	7.46
HD 20385	159	F6V	7.49
HD 13246	149	F7V	7.50
HD 17250	186	F7V	7.88
HD 32195	205	F7V	8.12
DS Tucanae	149	G6V	8.49
DK Ceti	135	G4V	8.66
HD 202917	153	G7V	8.67
BS Indi	172	G9V	8.87
CC Phoenicis	130	K1V	9.38
BO Microscopii	218	K3Ve	9.45
V857 Arae	194	G8V	9.50
AT Columbae	254	K1Ve	9.58
CT Tucanae	144	M0Ve	11.47
GJ 3054	134	M1.5V	11.97
AF Horologii	142	M2Ve	12.13
2MASS 0103	154	M5.0+L	15.40
2MASS 0219-3925	131	M6γ+L4γ	11.32 (J-band)
2MASS J02265658-5327032	152	L0δ	15.40 (J-band)

== See also ==
- List of nearby stellar associations and moving groups
- AB Doradus moving group
- Coma Star Cluster
