= K2-33b =

Young Super-Neptune orbiting K2-33

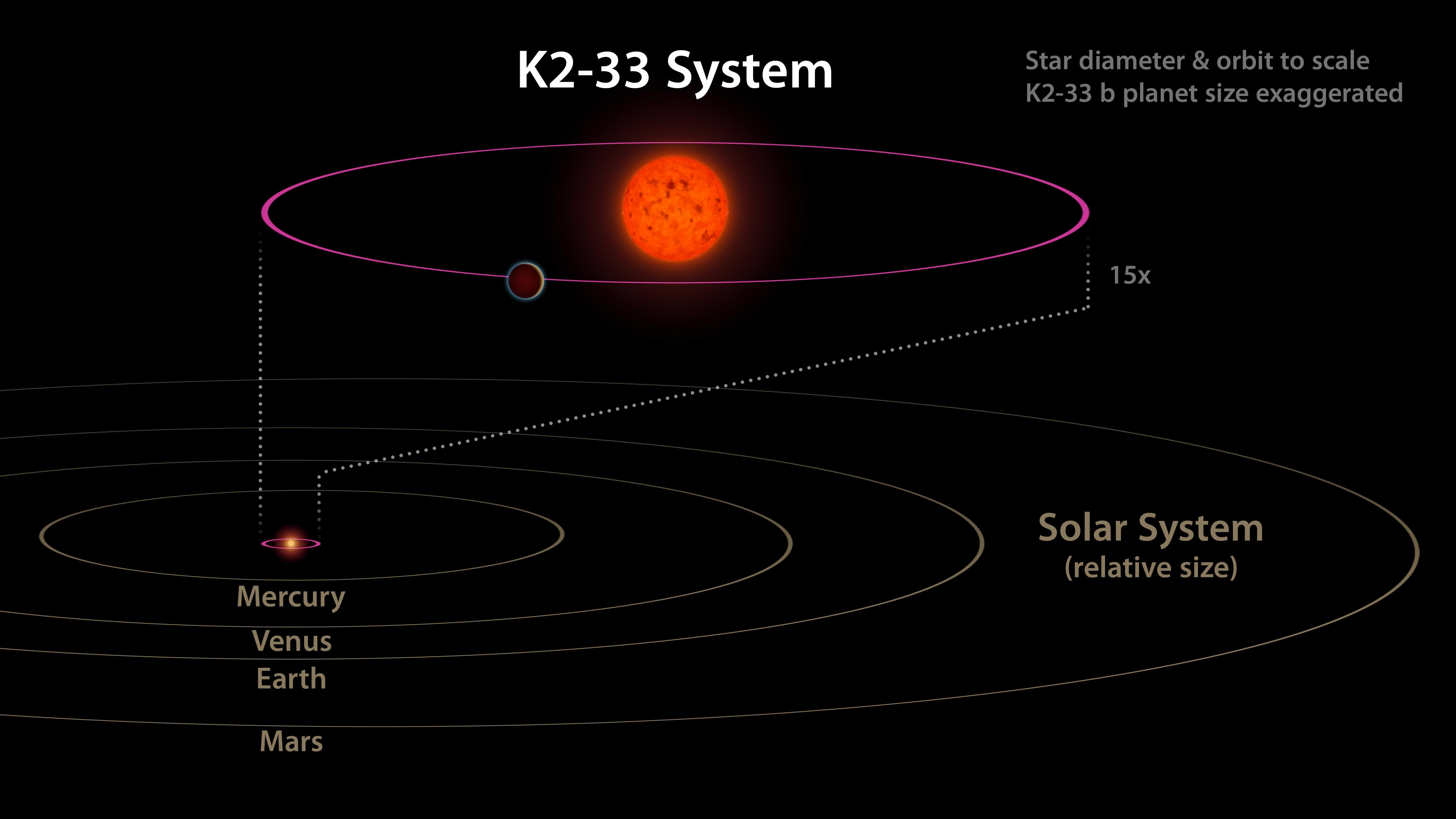
- Artist's impression of the K2-33 system (orbit and star sizes to scale) compared to the planets of the inner Solar System, with their respective orbits outlined.

Discovery
- Discovered by: K2 (Kepler) mission
- Discovery date: 21 June 2016
- Detection method: Transit

Orbital characteristics
- Semi-major axis: 0.0409 ^{+0.0021}_{−0.0023} AU
- Eccentricity: 0.0
- Orbital period (sidereal): 5.424865+0.000035 −0.000031 d
- Inclination: 89.1 ^{+0.6}_{−1.1}
- Star: K2-33

Physical characteristics
- Mean radius: 5.04 ^{+0.34}_{−0.37} R_{🜨}
- Mass: <3.6 M_{J}
- Temperature: 850 K (577 °C; 1,070 °F)

K2-33b (also known by its EPIC designation EPIC 205117205.01) is a very young super-Neptune exoplanet, orbiting the pre-main-sequence star K2-33. It was discovered by NASA's Kepler space telescope on its "Second Light" mission. It is located about 453 light-years (139 parsecs) away from Earth in the constellation of Scorpius. The exoplanet was found by using the transit method, in which the dimming effect that a planet causes as it crosses in front of its star is measured.

K2-33b is among the youngest known exoplanets, at 9.3 million years old.

== Physical characteristics ==
=== Mass, radius, and temperature ===
K2-33b is a super-Neptune, an exoplanet that has a mass and radius larger than that of Neptune. It has an equilibrium temperature of 850 K (577 °C; 1,070 °F). It has a radius of 5.04 R_{🜨}. The exoplanet's mass is not well constrained, with an upper limit mass of 3.6 M_{J}. Its true mass is likely much lower, at around 7-16 M_{🜨} in a ringed scenario, or even 3-5 M_{🜨} in a non-ringed scenario. Thus, in terms of mass it may be better described as a sub-Neptune.

=== Atmosphere ===
By 2022, the atmosphere of K2-33b was found to be hazy, without any noticeable molecular bands in transmission spectrum. Given the planetary radius and temperature, atmosphere is likely to contain an abundant carbon monoxide and dense tholin haze.

=== Host star ===
The planet orbits an (M-type) pre-main-sequence star named K2-33. The star has a mass of 0.54 M_{☉} and a radius of 1.05 R_{☉}. It has a surface temperature of 3540 K and is 9.3 million years old. In comparison, the Sun is 4.6 billion years old and has a surface temperature of 5778 K. It has about the same amount of metals as the Sun, with a metallicity ([Fe/H]) of 0. Its luminosity (L_{☉}) is 15% that of the Sun.

The star's apparent magnitude, or how bright it appears from Earth's perspective, is 14.3. Therefore, it is too dim to be seen with the naked eye.

=== Orbit ===
K2-33b orbits its host star with an orbital period of 5.424 days at a distance of 0.049 AU (compared to the distance of Mercury from the Sun, which is about 0.38 AU). The planet likely receives about 125 times as much sunlight that Earth does from the Sun.

=== Possible ring system ===
A 2022 study found evidence that K2-33b may be surrounded by a dusty ring system. This could be confirmed by future observations with the James Webb Space Telescope.

== Age and formation ==
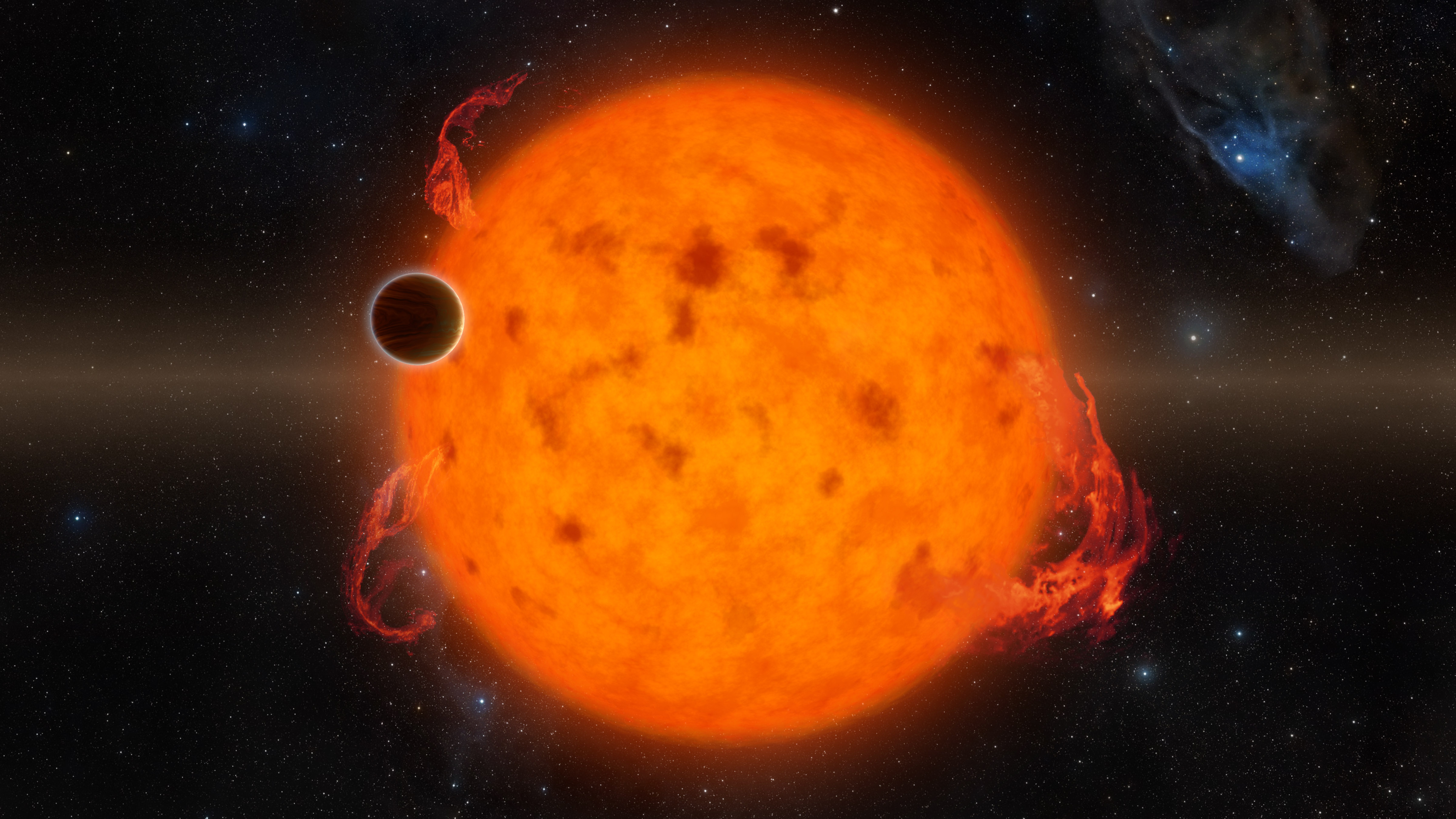
Artist's impression of K2-33b transiting its extremely young parent star.

The planet is best known for its remarkably young age, which is estimated to be about 9.3 million years. Given this age, the planetary system most likely formed near the end of the Miocene epoch of the Earth's history. Observations made on the planet confirmed that it was a fully formed exoplanet, not just a protoplanet that was still in the stages of developing. The mass and radius of the exoplanet further help constrain this statement.

It was the youngest transiting exoplanet until the discovery of IRAS 04125+2902 b in 2024. There are relatively few other exoplanets discovered to date with an age this young, all of which are non-transiting (with some that were detected around hot A-type and B-type stars, such as HD 95086 b and HIP 78530 b, however these could be brown dwarfs due to their mass). The hot Jupiter exoplanet V830 Tauri b, published in the same issue of the journal Nature as the discovery of K2-33b, may be younger with an age of around 2 million years (around the time that humans evolved on Earth), but the existence of this planet is disputed.

The discovery of K2-33b is notable for explaining how close-in planets form, an open question in the field of exoplanets since the discovery of the first exoplanet, 51 Pegasi b, in 1995. Given the young age of this exoplanet, several theories of planetary migration can be ruled out because they take too long to form close-in planets. The most plausible formation scenario for K2-33b is that it formed further away from its star, then migrated inwards through the protoplanetary disk, although it remains a possibility that the planet formed in place. Trevor David of Caltech in Pasadena stated on the discovery of the exoplanet "The question we are answering is: Did those planets take a long time to get into those hot orbits, or could they have been there from a very early stage? We are saying, at least in this one case, that they can indeed be there at a very early stage."

Understanding the young ages of such exoplanets may eventually help to lead scientists on how planetary formation works and provide some clues on the origin of the Solar System and other such planetary systems discovered.

== Discovery ==
In 2014, NASA's Kepler space telescope began its "Second Light" mission, after two of its reactor wheels had failed the previous year, ending the primary mission. From 23 August to 13 November 2014, the spacecraft collected data from the core of Upper Scorpius, which included K2-33. The exoplanet was simultaneously discovered by two independent research groups, one led by astronomers from the California Institute of Technology and the other led by astronomers from the University of Texas at Austin.

The star was studied on days in late January, February, and March 2016. The observations were made with the Immersion Grating Infrared Spectrometer (IGRINS) on the 2.7-m Harlan J. Smith Telescope at the McDonald Observatory. After observing the respective transits, which for K2-33b occurred roughly every 5 days (its orbital period), it was eventually concluded that a planetary body was responsible for the periodic 5-day transits. The discovery was announced on 20 June 2016 in an announcement made by NASA.

== See also ==
- V830 Tauri b
