= Lambda Arae =

Star in the constellation Ara

- Location of λ Arae (circled)

Observation data Epoch J2000 Equinox ICRS
- Constellation: Ara
- Right ascension: 17^{h} 40^{m} 23.826^{s}
- Declination: −49° 24′ 56.10″
- Apparent magnitude (V): 4.77

Characteristics
- Spectral type: F4 V
- U−B color index: −0.04
- B−V color index: +0.40
- R−I color index: +0.22
- Variable type: 3.10

Astrometry
Radial velocity (R_{v})	+3.3±0.3 km/s
Proper motion (μ)	RA: +104.233 mas/yr Dec.: −175.956 mas/yr
Parallax (π)	47.7045±0.1368 mas
Distance	68.4 ± 0.2 ly (20.96 ± 0.06 pc)
Absolute magnitude (M_{V})	+3.06

Details
Mass	1.37±0.04 M_{☉}
Radius	1.711±0.035 R_{☉}
Luminosity	4.69^{+0.03}_{−0.05} L_{☉}
Surface gravity (log g)	4.064^{+0.005}_{−0.003} cgs
Temperature	6,495^{+3}_{−7} K
Metallicity [Fe/H]	−0.24 dex
Rotational velocity (v sin i)	15.5 km/s
Age	2.44±0.39 Gyr

Other designations
- λ Ara, λ Arae, NSV 23218, CD−49°11616, GC 23918, GJ 686.2, GJ 9597, HD 160032, HIP 86486, HR 6569, SAO 228257, PPM 323240, NLTT 45187

Database references
SIMBAD	data

Lambda Arae is a star in the southern constellation of Ara. Its name is a Bayer designation that is Latinized from λ Arae, and abbreviated Lambda Ara or λ Ara. The apparent visual magnitude of this star is 4.77, making it bright enough to be seen with the naked eye. Based on parallax measurements, it is located at a distance of 68 light-years (21 parsecs) from Earth. This star is drifting further away from the Sun with a radial velocity of +3 km/s.

The spectrum of this star matches a stellar classification of F4 V, which places it among the category of F-type main sequence stars. It is an estimated 2.4 billion years old, and is spinning with a projected rotational velocity of 15.5 km/s. This star has 40% more mass than the Sun and a 70% greater radius. It shines with 4.7 times the luminosity of the Sun. The outer atmosphere is radiating this energy at an effective temperature of 6,495 K, giving it the yellow-white hue of an F-type star. There is some evidence that this may be a binary star system consisting of two stars with identical masses.

Examination of Lambda Arae with the Spitzer Space Telescope shows an excess of infrared emission at a wavelength of 70 μm. This suggests it may be orbited by a disk of dust at a radius of more than 15 astronomical units.
