= HD 91324 =

Star in the constellation Vela

- Location of HD 91324 (circled in red)

Observation data Epoch J2000 Equinox ICRS
- Constellation: Vela
- Right ascension: 10^{h} 31^{m} 21.82130^{s}
- Declination: −53° 42′ 55.7373″
- Apparent magnitude (V): 4.89

Characteristics
- Spectral type: F9V Fe-0.8 CH-0.7
- B−V color index: 0.500±0.015

Astrometry
Radial velocity (R_{v})	+21.37±0.20 km/s
Proper motion (μ)	RA: −420.131 mas/yr Dec.: +209.450 mas/yr
Parallax (π)	45.6124±0.1682 mas
Distance	71.5 ± 0.3 ly (21.92 ± 0.08 pc)
Absolute magnitude (M_{V})	3.20

Details

HD 91324 A
Mass	1.18 M_{☉}
Radius	1.86±0.06 R_{☉}
Luminosity	4.55 L_{☉}
Surface gravity (log g)	3.97±0.10 cgs
Temperature	6,127±70 K
Metallicity [Fe/H]	−0.27±0.06 dex
Rotational velocity (v sin i)	8.8±0.6 km/s
Age	3.52±1.08 Gyr

Other designations
- CD−53°3569, GJ 397.2, GJ 9332, HD 91324, HIP 51523, HR 4134, SAO 238146

Database references
SIMBAD	data

HD 91324 is a likely binary star system in the southern constellation of Vela. It is visible to the naked eye with an apparent visual magnitude of 4.89. The distance to HD 91324, as determined from its annual parallax shift of 45.6 mas, is 71.5 light years. It is moving further from the Earth with a heliocentric radial velocity of +21 km/s.

The primary, component A, is a metal-deficient F-type main-sequence star with a stellar classification of F9V Fe-0.8 CH-0.7, where the suffix notation indicates underabundances of iron and methine in its spectrum. It is around 3.5 billion years old and is spinning with a projected rotational velocity of 9 km/s. The star has 1.18 times the mass of the Sun and 1.86 times the Sun's radius. It is radiating 4.55 times the Sun's luminosity from its photosphere at an effective temperature of 6,127 K.

A faint star designated 2MASS J10313234–5338010 was found to be a possible companion to HD 91324 through a proper motion study combining data from the Two Micron All-Sky Survey and the WISE space telescope. The projected separation of the two components is 309″, or 6,700 AU. Proper motion measurements for the two stars are almost identical making HD 91324 a likely binary star system. The photometry of 2MASS J10313234–5338010 is consistent with it being a red dwarf of spectral type M5 or M6.
