= PKS 0215+015 =

Quasar in the constellation of Cetus

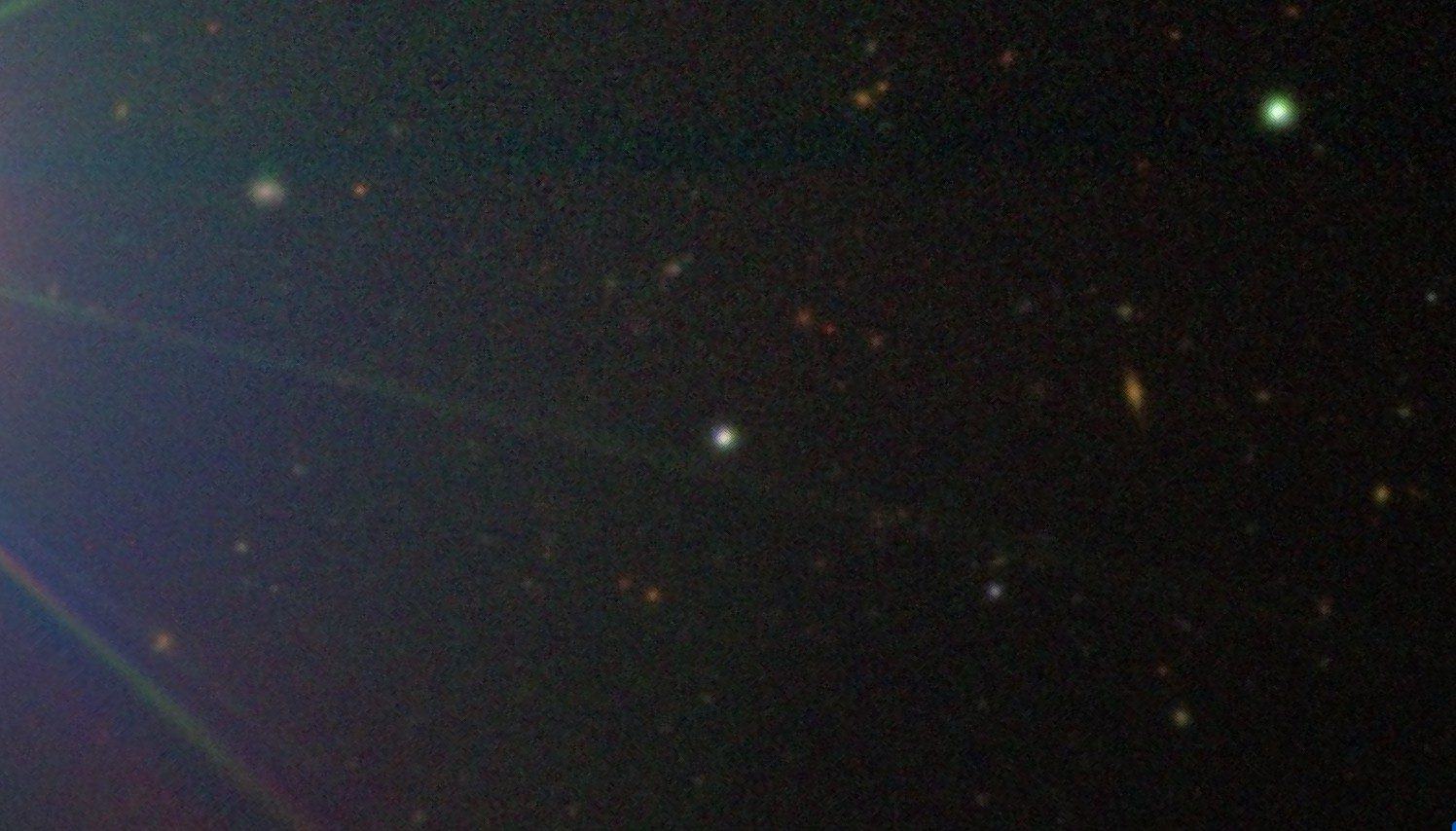
- The BL Lacertae object PKS 0215+015.

Observation data (J2000.0 epoch)
- Constellation: Cetus
- Right ascension: 02^{h} 17^{m} 48.954^{s}
- Declination: +01° 44′ 49.699″
- Redshift: 1.720000
- Heliocentric radial velocity: 515,643 km/s
- Distance: 9.545 Gly
- Apparent magnitude (V): 16.74
- Apparent magnitude (B): 16.09

Characteristics
- Type: Opt var, FSRQ BLLAC

Other designations
- PKS B0215+015, LEDA 2823038, PMN J0217+0144, OD +026, WMAP 096, NVSS J021748+014448, FIRST J021748.9+014449

PKS 0215+015 is a BL Lacertae object (BL Lac) located in the constellation of Cetus. It has a high redshift of (z) 1.72 and was first discovered in 1971 by J.V. Wall and his colleagues during the Parkes Catalogue of Radio Sources survey. The radio spectrum of the source is flat, making it a flat-spectrum radio quasar, a type of blazar also known as an optically violent variable quasar in literature.

== Description ==
PKS 0215+015 is classified as a bona fide BL Lac object, displaying typical characteristics such as weak emission lines and high rapid polarization changes. It is variable on the electromagnetic spectrum with its optical band displaying variations of more than 4 magnitudes. Rapid polarization swings at 50° and -100° were found associated with the rapid flux variations of the object.

According to optical continuum observations, PKS 0215+015 is found to undergo a flaring period, brightening up to 1.5 magnitude by September 10, 1980. On October 20, 1984, the object reached its brightest state with a B magnitude of 14.5 while its faintest state was recorded on August 11, 1983. By 1986, its brightness flared up once more after being in a faint state in 1985. Observations by the Australia Telescope Compact Array (ATCA), also showed the source had a strong long-term increase in its flux density since May 2021.

The radio structure of PKS 0215+015 is compact. Based on radio observations, the source has an inverted spectrum which peaks over 10 GHz. It has a radio core which has a high brightness temperature. Very Large Array imaging showed there is also a bent jet pointing in a north to south direction near the core region, with a subsequent bend clearly shown pointing east. The jet also has a component visible at 2 centimeter and 7 millimeter wavelength imaging which in turn is blended partially with the core.

In February 2022, the IceCube Neutrino Observatory detected a new candidate high-track energy muon neutrino event. Dubbed IceCube-220225A, it was found to be associated with PKS 0215+015 which at that time, was undergoing a powerful radio flare exceeding flux densities of 3 Jy at both centimeter and millimeter wavelengths. Observations also suggested the neutrino production happened closer to the core.

Several absorption lines have been identified in the quasar's ultraviolet spectrum, with one of the lines at (z) 1.345 displaying evidence of ionized neutral magnesium, manganese and ionized iron absorption. Another absorption line located at (z) 1.721, shows cerium and chromium oxide absorption.
