= Theta Sculptoris =

Star in the constellation Sculptor

- Location of θ Sculptoris (circled)

Observation data Epoch J2000.0 Equinox ICRS
- Constellation: Sculptor
- Right ascension: 00^{h} 11^{m} 44.02079^{s}
- Declination: −35° 07′ 59.2320″
- Apparent magnitude (V): +5.236±0.005

Characteristics
- Evolutionary stage: main sequence
- Spectral type: F5V
- B−V color index: 0.459±0.002

Astrometry
Radial velocity (R_{v})	−21.1±0.3 km/s
Proper motion (μ)	RA: +171.529 mas/yr Dec.: +126.670 mas/yr
Parallax (π)	46.1936±0.1565 mas
Distance	70.6 ± 0.2 ly (21.65 ± 0.07 pc)
Absolute magnitude (M_{V})	3.52

Details
Mass	1.25 M_{☉}
Radius	1.40±0.05 R_{☉}
Luminosity	3.09 L_{☉}
Surface gravity (log g)	4.25±0.10 cgs
Temperature	6,395±80 K
Metallicity [Fe/H]	−0.07±0.07 dex
Rotational velocity (v sin i)	1.0±1.0 km/s
Age	1.6+2.4 −0.5 Gyr

Other designations
- θ Scl, CD−35°4, FK5 6, GC 202, GJ 3013, HD 739, HIP 950, HR 35, SAO 192388, LTT 79, GSC 06995-01262

Database references
SIMBAD	data

θ Sculptoris, Latinized as Theta Sculptoris, is a star in the southern constellation of Sculptor. This object is visible to the naked eye as a dim, yellow-white hued star with an apparent visual magnitude of +5.24. It is located 71 light years from the Sun based on parallax. The object is drifting closer with a radial velocity of −21 km/s, and may come to within 49 light-years in half a million years.

This is an astrometric binary system. The visible component is an ordinary F-type main-sequence star with a stellar classification of F5V. It is around 1.6 billion years old with 1.25 times the mass of the Sun and 1.40 times the Sun's radius. The star is radiating three times the luminosity of the Sun from its photosphere at an effective temperature of 6,395 K.
