= Small telescope =

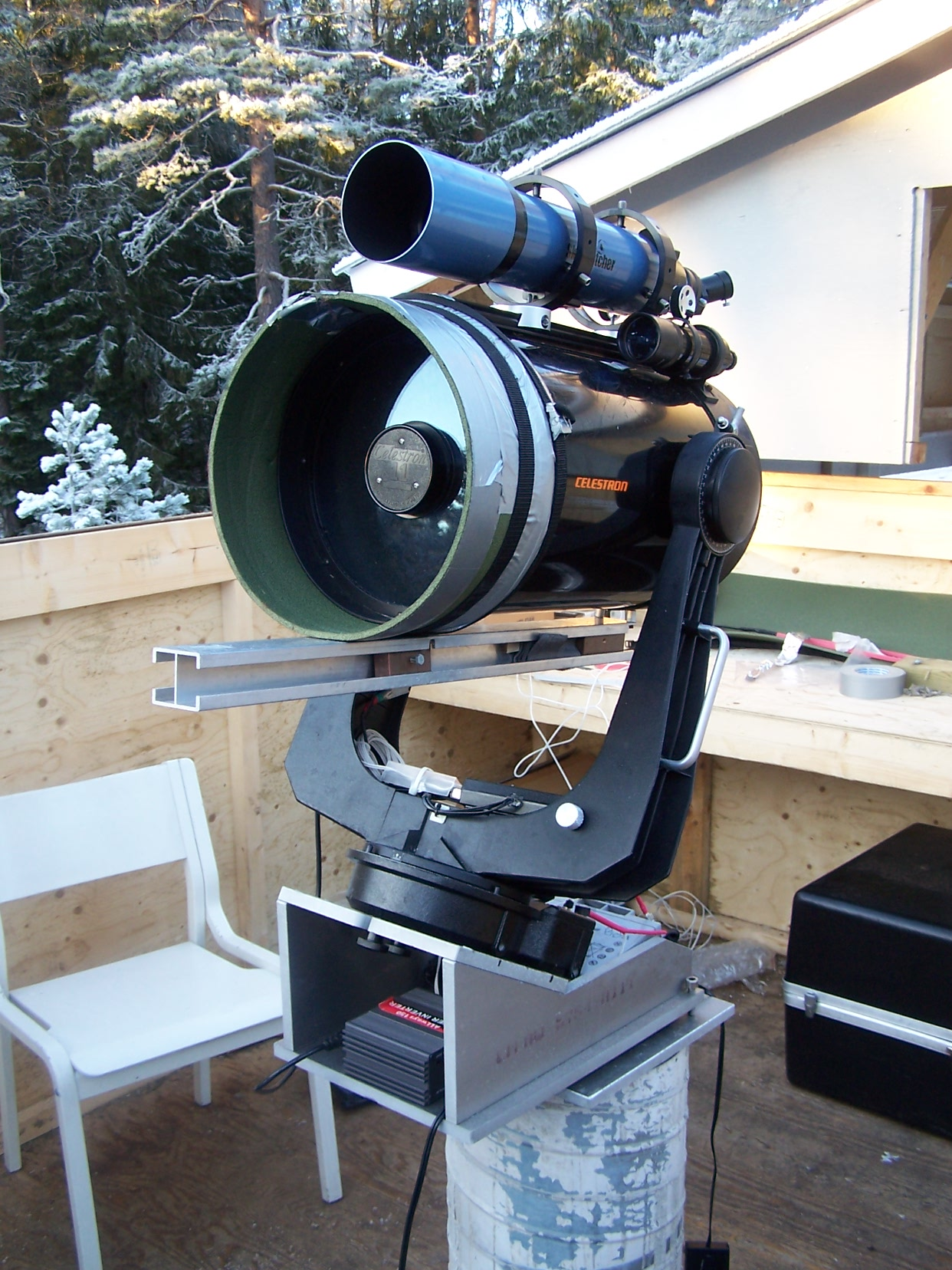
Small telescope mounted at an angle, forming an equatorial mount; note the retracted roof of the observatory

A small telescope is generally considered by professional astronomers to be any reflecting telescope with a primary mirror that is less than 2 metres (80 in) in diameter. By amateur standards, a small telescope can have a primary mirror/aperture less than 6–10 inches (150–250 mm) in diameter. Little if any professional-level research is performed with refracting telescopes in the modern era of astronomy.

Small telescopes dominate astronomical research in the fields of asteroid/comet discovery/observation, variable star photometry, supernova/nova discovery, and colorimetry/polarimetry of the Solar System's planets.

Because of their limited light-gathering capability, small telescopes are usually not well-suited to spectroscopy. However, some useful spectroscopic work can be performed with reflecting telescopes with a primary mirror as small as 14 inches (360 mm) when equipped with the increasingly sophisticated CCD imaging and spectroscopic instrumentation that has become available to amateur astronomers in the 21st century.

Most telescopes within the field of amateur astronomy are considered to be small, ranging in general from 2-inch (50 mm) refracting achromatic telescopes, to reflecting telescopes featuring primary mirrors up to 36 inches (910 mm) or more in diameter. Most small telescopes are dedicated to visual observation, although many are used for astrophotography or to gather scientific data.

The range of amateur astronomers' telescopes is wide, with numerous types and designs. Refracting designs include achromatic and apochromatic types. Some reflecting types are Newtonian, Schmidt–Cassegrain, Maksutov-Cassegrain, and Maksutov-Newtonian. Even sophisticated designs, such as the Ritchey–Chrétien and (corrected) Dall–Kirkham, which have traditionally been used only in large professional-grade instruments, have become available to amateurs.
