= V830 Tauri =

Star in the constellation Taurus

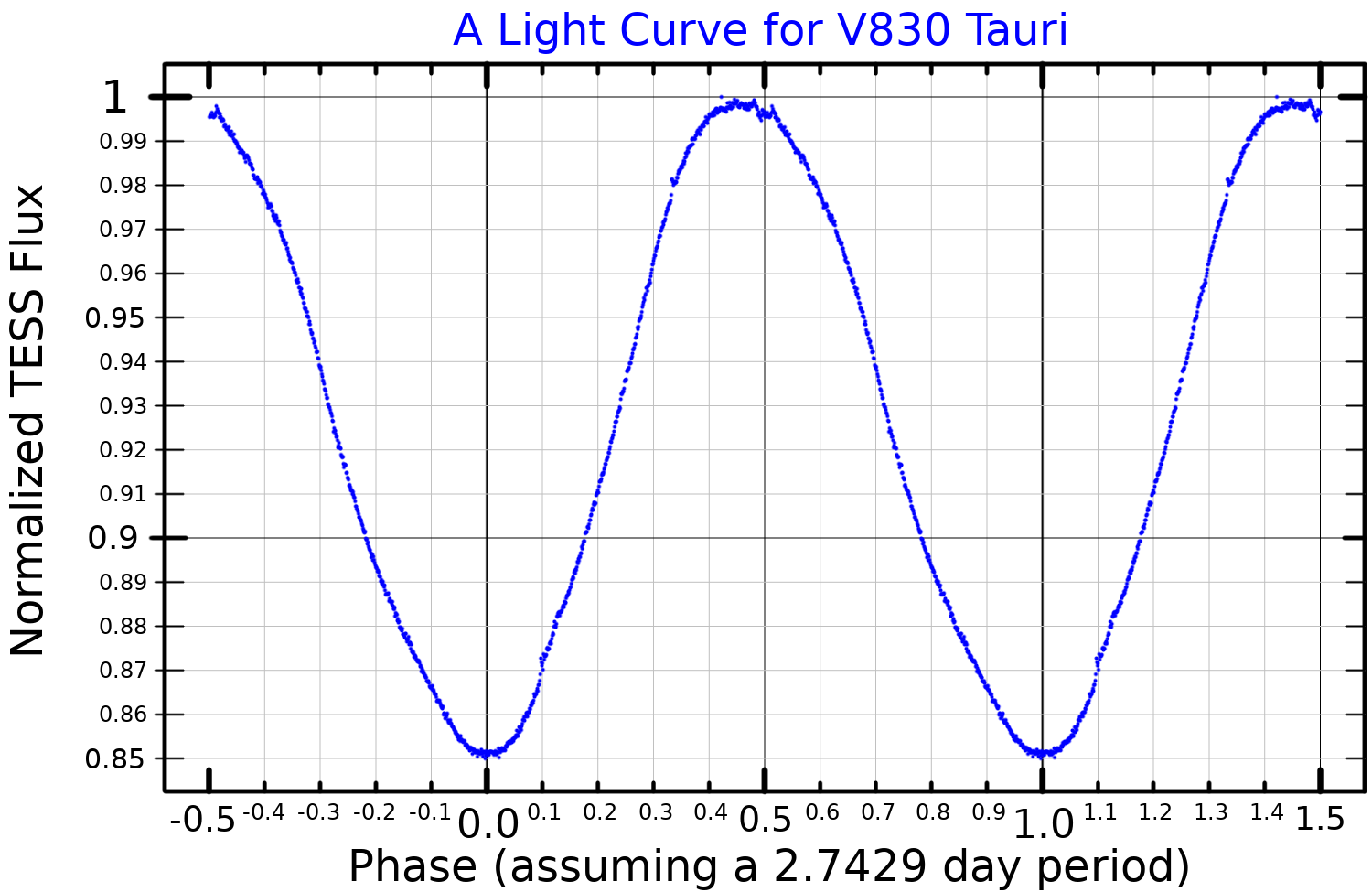
- A light curve for V830 Tauri, plotted from TESS data

Observation data Epoch J2000.0 Equinox J2000.0
- Constellation: Taurus
- Right ascension: 04^{h} 33^{m} 10.03006^{s}
- Declination: +24° 33′ 43.2555″
- Apparent magnitude (V): 12.08 - 12.37

Characteristics
- Evolutionary stage: T Tau
- Spectral type: M0-1
- Variable type: BY Dra

Astrometry
Radial velocity (R_{v})	5.98±11.60 km/s
Proper motion (μ)	RA: 7.171±0.022 mas/yr Dec.: −21.197±0.017 mas/yr
Parallax (π)	7.6704±0.0165 mas
Distance	425.2 ± 0.9 ly (130.4 ± 0.3 pc)

Details
Mass	1.00±0.05 M_{☉}
Radius	2.0±0.2 R_{☉}
Luminosity	1.2 L_{☉}
Temperature	4,250±50 K
Rotation	2.741 days
Rotational velocity (v sin i)	30.5±0.5 km/s
Age	~2 Myr

Other designations
- V830 Tauri, IRAS C04301+2427, 2MASS J04331003+2433433

Database references
SIMBAD	data

V830 Tauri is a T Tauri star located 425.2 light-years (130.4 pc) away from the Sun in the constellation Taurus. This star is very young, with an age of only 2 million years, compared to the Sun's age, which is 4.6 billion years. Typical for a young star, it exhibits strong flare activity, with three flares detected during a 91-day observation period in 2016.

== Characteristics ==
V830 Tauri is an M-type star. The star has a mass of roughly 1 solar mass, but has a radius of 2 solar radii, due to the star's age, which means that it hasn't fully contracted yet to become a main-sequence star. (It will likely be on the main sequence portion of its lifetime for about 10 billion years, much like the Sun.) It has a surface temperature of 4,250 K. For comparison, the Sun's surface temperature is 5,772 K.

V830 Tauri is a weak-lined T Tauri star, a pre-main sequence star that has a surrounding disc producing emission lines in its spectrum. It is also classified as a BY Draconis variable, cool stars with starspots and chromospheric activity that vary in brightness as they rotate. The variable period of 2.74 days matches the rotation period.

== Planetary system ==
The V830 Tauri planetary system
Companion (in order from star)	Mass	Semimajor axis (AU)	Orbital period (days)	Eccentricity	Inclination (°)	Radius
b (controversial)	0.77±0.15 M_{J}	0.057±0.001	4.93±0.05	0	55°	—

On June 20, 2016, an exoplanet was found around V830 Tauri via radial velocity. It is one of, if not the youngest exoplanet ever found, with an age of only about 2 million years. The exoplanet has a mass of about 0.77 masses of Jupiter and is orbiting 0.057 AU away from its host star with a period of 4.93 d and an inclination of 55°. However, a 2020 study was unable to confirm this planet. (Note: Works by Donati claims to detect 0.068km/s radial-velocity planetary signal embedded within 1.2km/s jitter, based only on 27 radial-velocity measurements.)

V830 Tauri b orbits its parent star every 4.93 days at a distance of 0.057 AU from its parent star. This is about 7x closer to the host star than the planet Mercury is to the Sun. Its mass is about 70% that of Jupiter, and, because it is orbiting very close to its parent star, it is classified as a hot Jupiter.

Previously, before the discovery of V830 Tauri b (and a slightly older planet named K2-33b, with an age around 5-10 million years), TW Hya b was discovered and disproven and PTFO 8-8695 b / CVSO 30 b was discovered with an age equally young and an orbit even closer. The yet unconfirmed objects are pending confirmation. The discovery of V830 Tauri b, K2-33b and PTFO 8-8695 b / CVSO 30 b suggests that the formation and migration of close-in giant planets can occur on a timescale of only a few million years. The new discoveries support planet-disc interactions as the most likely mechanism for efficiently producing young hot Jupiters.
