= List of stars in Gemini =

This is the list of notable stars in the constellation Gemini, sorted by decreasing brightness.

Name	B	F	Var	HD	HIP	RA	Dec	vis. mag.	abs. mag.	Dist. (ly)	Sp. class	Notes
Pollux	β	78		62509	37826	07^{h} 45^{m} 19.36^{s}	+28° 01′ 34.7″	1.16	1.09	34	K0III	Al-Ras al-Taum al-Mu'ahar, Muekher al Dzira, Posterior Brachii; suspected variable, V_{max} = 1.10^{m}, V_{min} = 1.17^{m}; has a planet (b)
Castor A	α	66		60179A	36850	07^{h} 34^{m} 36.00^{s}	+31° 53′ 19.1″	1.90	1.05	52	A2Vm	Al-Ras al-Taum al-Muqadim, Aoul al Dzira, Prima Brachii
γ Gem	γ	24		47105	31681	06^{h} 37^{m} 42.70^{s}	+16° 23′ 57.9″	1.93	−0.60	105	A0IV	Alhena, Almeisan, Nir al Henat, Prima του al Henat
μ Gem	μ	13		44478	30343	06^{h} 22^{m} 57.59^{s}	+22° 30′ 49.9″	2.87	−1.39	232	M3.0III	Tejat Posterior, Tejat, Calx, Pish Pai; semiregular variable, V_{max} = 2.75^{m}, V_{min} = 3.02^{m}
Castor B	α	66		60178		07^{h} 34^{m} 36.00^{s}	+31° 53′ 19.0″	2.88			Am	
ε Gem	ε	27		48329	32246	06^{h} 43^{m} 55.93^{s}	+25° 07′ 52.2″	3.06	−4.15	903	G8Ib	Mebsuta; variable star, V_{max} = 2.97^{m}, V_{min} = 3.09^{m}
η Gem	η	7		42995	29655	06^{h} 14^{m} 52.70^{s}	+22° 30′ 24.6″	3.31	−1.84	349	M3III	Propus, Praepes, Tejat Prior; semiregular and Algol variable, V_{max} = 3.15^{m}, V_{min} = 3.9^{m}, P = 232.9 d
ξ Gem	ξ	31		48737	32362	06^{h} 45^{m} 17.43^{s}	+12° 53′ 45.8″	3.35	2.13	57	F5IV	Alzir; suspected variable, V_{max} = 3.33^{m}, V_{min} = 3.42^{m}
δ Gem	δ	55		56986	35550	07^{h} 20^{m} 07.39^{s}	+21° 58′ 56.4″	3.50	2.22	59	F0IV...	Wasat
κ Gem	κ	77		62345	37740	07^{h} 44^{m} 26.87^{s}	+24° 23′ 53.3″	3.57	0.35	143	G8III	Jīxīn (積薪), 隆博星 (Takahiro-boshi)
λ Gem	λ	54		56537	35350	07^{h} 18^{m} 05.61^{s}	+16° 32′ 25.7″	3.58	1.27	94	A3V...	suspected variable, V_{max} = 3.52^{m}, V_{min} = 3.62^{m}
θ Gem	θ	34		50019	33018	06^{h} 52^{m} 47.34^{s}	+33° 57′ 40.9″	3.60	−0.30	197	A3III	
ι Gem	ι	60		58207	36046	07^{h} 25^{m} 43.68^{s}	+27° 47′ 53.8″	3.78	0.85	126	G9III+...	Propus
ζ Gem	ζ	43		52973	34088	07^{h} 04^{m} 06.54^{s}	+20° 34′ 13.1″	4.01	−3.76	1168	G1Ib	Mekbuda; classical Cepheid, V_{max} = 3.62^{m}, V_{min} = 4.18^{m}, P = 10.15 d
υ Gem	υ	69		60522	36962	07^{h} 35^{m} 55.37^{s}	+26° 53′ 45.6″	4.06	−0.28	240	K5III	suspected variable, V_{max} = 4.04^{m}, V_{min} = 4.08^{m}
ν Gem A	ν	18		45542	30883	06^{h} 28^{m} 57.79^{s}	+20° 12′ 43.8″	4.13	−1.81	502	B6III	Nucatai
1 Gem		1		41116	28734	06^{h} 04^{m} 07.22^{s}	+23° 15′ 49.1″	4.16	0.84	151	G7III	Propus
ρ Gem	ρ	62		58946	36366	07^{h} 29^{m} 06.61^{s}	+31° 47′ 02.7″	4.16	2.82	60	F0V...	suspected variable
σ Gem	σ	75		62044	37629	07^{h} 43^{m} 18.69^{s}	+28° 53′ 02.7″	4.23	1.36	122	K1III SB	RS CVn variable, V_{max} = 4.13^{m}, V_{min} = 4.29^{m}, P = 19.42 d
τ Gem	τ	46		54719	34693	07^{h} 11^{m} 08.39^{s}	+30° 14′ 43.0″	4.41	−0.42	302	K2III	suspected variable, V_{max} = 4.37^{m}, V_{min} = 4.42^{m}; has a brown dwarf companion
30 Gem		30		48433	32249	06^{h} 43^{m} 59.29^{s}	+13° 13′ 41.3″	4.49	−0.15	276	K1III	
38 Gem	e	38		50635	33202	06^{h} 54^{m} 38.59^{s}	+13° 10′ 40.9″	4.71	2.48	91	F0Vp	
ο Gem	ο	71		61110	37265	07^{h} 39^{m} 09.96^{s}	+34° 35′ 04.7″	4.89	1.46	158	F3III	Jishui
81 Gem	g	81		62721	37908	07^{h} 46^{m} 07.49^{s}	+18° 30′ 36.6″	4.89	−0.21	341	K5III	
χ Gem	χ	(6)		66216	39424	08^{h} 03^{m} 31.10^{s}	+27° 47′ 39.9″	4.94	0.45	258	K2III	6 Cancri
φ Gem	φ	83		64145	38538	07^{h} 53^{m} 29.84^{s}	+26° 45′ 57.1″	4.97	0.51	254	A3V	
65 Gem	b	65		59148	36429	07^{h} 29^{m} 48.78^{s}	+27° 54′ 58.3″	5.01	−0.34	383	K2III	
57 Gem	A	57		57727	35846	07^{h} 23^{m} 28.55^{s}	+25° 03′ 02.2″	5.04	1.67	154	G8III	
74 Gem	f	74		61338	37300	07^{h} 39^{m} 28.59^{s}	+17° 40′ 28.3″	5.04	−1.02	532	M0III	suspected variable, ΔV = 0.08^{m}
51 Gem		51	BQ	55383	34909	07^{h} 13^{m} 22.27^{s}	+16° 09′ 32.6″	5.07	−1.59	700	K3V	semiregular variable
64 Gem		64		59037	36393	07^{h} 29^{m} 20.46^{s}	+28° 07′ 06.3″	5.07	1.58	163	A4V	
56 Gem		56		57423	35699	07^{h} 21^{m} 56.90^{s}	+20° 26′ 37.4″	5.09	−0.50	428	M0III	suspected variable, ΔV = 0.06^{m}
HD 52960				52960	34033	07^{h} 03^{m} 38.07^{s}	+10° 57′ 06.6″	5.14	−1.65	743	K3III	
π Gem	π	80		62898	38016	07^{h} 47^{m} 30.34^{s}	+33° 24′ 56.8″	5.14	−1.04	562	M0III	suspected variable, ΔV = 0.08^{m}
26 Gem		26		48097	32104	06^{h} 42^{m} 24.32^{s}	+17° 38′ 43.9″	5.20	2.05	139	A2V	
ω Gem	ω	42		52497	33927	07^{h} 02^{m} 24.78^{s}	+24° 12′ 55.6″	5.20	−3.33	1655	G5II	slow irregular variable, V_{max} = 5.18^{m}, V_{min} = 5.20^{m}
63 Gem		63		58728	36238	07^{h} 27^{m} 44.39^{s}	+21° 26′ 44.0″	5.20	2.54	111	F5IV-V...	Triple star system
68 Gem		68		60107	36760	07^{h} 33^{m} 36.50^{s}	+15° 49′ 36.1″	5.27	−0.03	375	A1Vn	suspected variable
36 Gem	d	36		49908	32921	06^{h} 51^{m} 33.05^{s}	+21° 45′ 40.4″	5.28	−0.77	529	A2V	
76 Gem	c	76		62285	37704	07^{h} 44^{m} 06.92^{s}	+25° 47′ 03.2″	5.30	−1.01	595	K5III	suspected variable, V_{max} = 5.28^{m}, V_{min} = 5.32^{m}
HD 60318				60318	36896	07^{h} 35^{m} 08.82^{s}	+30° 57′ 39.3″	5.34	0.50	302	K0III	
85 Gem		85		64648	38722	07^{h} 55^{m} 39.90^{s}	+19° 53′ 02.6″	5.38	0.29	339	A0Vs	
28 Gem		28		48450	32311	06^{h} 44^{m} 45.46^{s}	+28° 58′ 15.6″	5.42	−0.79	570	K4III	
HD 59686				59686	36616	07^{h} 31^{m} 48.37^{s}	+17° 05′ 10.4″	5.45	0.62	302	K2III	has a planet (b)
45 Gem		45		54131	34440	07^{h} 08^{m} 22.04^{s}	+15° 55′ 51.3″	5.47	0.61	305	G8III	
HD 53329				53329	34267	07^{h} 06^{m} 11.63^{s}	+34° 28′ 26.7″	5.55	0.69	305	G8IV	
NZ Gem			NZ	61913	37521	07^{h} 42^{m} 03.22^{s}	+14° 12′ 30.7″	5.55	−1.93	1022	M3S	semiregular variable, V_{max} = 5.52^{m}, V_{min} = 5.72^{m}
HD 46374				46374	31277	06^{h} 33^{m} 36.17^{s}	+14° 09′ 19.3″	5.57	1.10	256	K2III:	
70 Gem		70		60986	37204	07^{h} 38^{m} 32.84^{s}	+35° 02′ 54.5″	5.58	0.72	306	K0III	
35 Gem		35		49738	32814	06^{h} 50^{m} 25.50^{s}	+13° 24′ 47.5″	5.68	−2.64	1502	K3III	
HD 49968				49968	32968	06^{h} 52^{m} 00.01^{s}	+23° 36′ 06.3″	5.68	−0.30	513	K5III	
IS Gem			IS	49380	32740	06^{h} 49^{m} 41.34^{s}	+32° 36′ 24.8″	5.72	0.85	307	K3II	semiregular variable
41 Gem		41		52005	33715	07^{h} 00^{m} 15.82^{s}	+16° 04′ 44.4″	5.73	−5.53	5821	K3Ib	suspected variable
37 Gem		37		50692	33277	06^{h} 55^{m} 18.69^{s}	+25° 22′ 32.3″	5.73	4.56	56	G0V	suspected variable, ΔV = 0.02^{m}
3 Gem		3	PU	42087	29225	06^{h} 09^{m} 43.99^{s}	+23° 06′ 48.5″	5.75			B2.5Ib	α Cyg variable, V_{max} = 5.71^{m}, V_{min} = 5.77^{m}, P = 6.81 d
47 Gem		47		54801	34722	07^{h} 11^{m} 23.08^{s}	+26° 51′ 24.0″	5.75	0.36	390	A4IV	suspected δ Sct variable
53 Gem		53		55870	35152	07^{h} 15^{m} 57.18^{s}	+27° 53′ 50.7″	5.75	−1.85	1079	M1III	variable star, ΔV = 0.012^{m}, P = 6.22 d
59 Gem		59		57927	35941	07^{h} 24^{m} 33.44^{s}	+27° 38′ 16.1″	5.77	1.73	209	F0:III:	δ Sct variable
HD 52556				52556	33914	07^{h} 02^{m} 17.49^{s}	+15° 20′ 09.8″	5.78	−0.70	644	K1III:	
HD 61885				61885	37508	07^{h} 41^{m} 51.87^{s}	+13° 28′ 49.8″	5.79	−1.12	786	M2III	semiregular variable
5 Gem		5		42398	29379	06^{h} 11^{m} 32.31^{s}	+24° 25′ 13.4″	5.83	−0.99	753	K0III	On 5 June 2013, it was occulted by Venus as viewed from Australia, New Guinea, the West Pacific, Alaska.
52 Gem		52		55621	35025	07^{h} 14^{m} 41.94^{s}	+24° 53′ 06.7″	5.84	0.77	337	M1III	suspected variable
48 Gem		48		55052	34819	07^{h} 12^{m} 26.39^{s}	+24° 07′ 43.3″	5.85	0.70	349	F5IV	
33 Gem		33	OV	49606	32753	06^{h} 49^{m} 49.85^{s}	+16° 12′ 10.5″	5.85	−1.38	926	B7III	α^{2} CVn variable, ΔV = 0.1^{m}, P = 2.27 d
HD 52609				52609	33937	07^{h} 02^{m} 33.29^{s}	+16° 40′ 28.1″	5.86	−2.99	1918	M2III	suspected variable
HD 51000				51000	33421	06^{h} 57^{m} 00.54^{s}	+33° 40′ 51.7″	5.91	0.55	385	G5III	
HD 42049				42049	29196	06^{h} 09^{m} 32.44^{s}	+22° 11′ 25.0″	5.93	−5.45	6151	K4III	slow irregular variable, V_{max} = 5.91^{m}, V_{min} = 5.96^{m}
HD 52711				52711	34017	07^{h} 03^{m} 30.35^{s}	+29° 20′ 20.7″	5.93	4.53	62	G4V	
HD 61603				61603	37428	07^{h} 40^{m} 58.52^{s}	+23° 01′ 06.8″	5.93	−2.42	1523	K5	
HD 53686				53686	34358	07^{h} 07^{m} 22.41^{s}	+34° 00′ 33.7″	5.94	−0.66	681	K4III	
61 Gem		61		58579	36156	07^{h} 26^{m} 56.33^{s}	+20° 15′ 27.3″	5.94	0.47	405	F2Vn	suspected δ Sct variable
NP Gem			NP	52554	33929	07^{h} 02^{m} 25.52^{s}	+17° 45′ 19.6″	5.96	−2.13	1353	M1.5	slow irregular variable, V_{max} = 5.89^{m}, V_{min} = 6.04^{m}
HD 47575				47575	31876	06^{h} 39^{m} 47.73^{s}	+12° 58′ 58.1″	5.99	1.25	289	A2V	
44 Gem		44		53257	34182	07^{h} 05^{m} 18.37^{s}	+22° 38′ 14.9″	6.00	0.17	478	B8Vn	
HD 52976				52976	34055	07^{h} 03^{m} 51.60^{s}	+12° 35′ 39.3″	6.01	−1.93	1264	K5	variable star, ΔV = 0.008^{m}, P = 3.37 d
HD 63889				63889	38394	07^{h} 51^{m} 56.80^{s}	+19° 19′ 30.6″	6.03	0.50	415	K1III:	
HD 40589				40589	28500	06^{h} 01^{m} 00.45^{s}	+27° 34′ 20.5″	6.04	−4.73	4657	B9Iab	variable star, ΔV = 0.012^{m}, P = 9.26 d
HD 44927				44927	30570	06^{h} 25^{m} 32.94^{s}	+23° 19′ 38.0″	6.05	−0.19	578	A2Vn	
HD 61859				61859	37580	07^{h} 42^{m} 43.61^{s}	+34° 00′ 00.8″	6.05	2.36	178	F7V	
HD 63589				63589	38319	07^{h} 51^{m} 02.37^{s}	+33° 14′ 01.1″	6.06	2.04	208	A2m	
HD 63352				63352	38147	07^{h} 49^{m} 01.81^{s}	+13° 22′ 18.8″	6.07	−0.46	660	K0	
8 Gem		8		43261	29789	06^{h} 16^{m} 19.05^{s}	+23° 58′ 12.2″	6.09	0.46	436	G8III	
HD 47358				47358	31813	06^{h} 39^{m} 05.29^{s}	+22° 01′ 51.4″	6.09	0.54	419	G9III	
HD 61295				61295	37339	07^{h} 39^{m} 54.10^{s}	+32° 00′ 35.4″	6.16	1.53	275	F6II	
58 Gem		58		57744	35842	07^{h} 23^{m} 28.15^{s}	+22° 56′ 43.6″	6.17	1.27	312	A1V	
HD 45951				45951	31067	06^{h} 31^{m} 10.03^{s}	+16° 56′ 19.1″	6.18			K2III...	
HD 61219				61219	37269	07^{h} 39^{m} 12.01^{s}	+24° 13′ 21.1″	6.18	0.56	435	A2V	
82 Gem		82		63208	38106	07^{h} 48^{m} 33.65^{s}	+23° 08′ 27.5″	6.18	−1.36	1052	G2III+...	suspected variable
HD 56386				56386	35345	07^{h} 18^{m} 04.09^{s}	+30° 57′ 21.3″	6.19	−0.18	612	A0Vn	
39 Gem		39		51530	33595	06^{h} 58^{m} 47.52^{s}	+26° 04′ 51.1″	6.20	2.82	155	F7V	suspected variable
16 Gem		16		45394	30769	06^{h} 27^{m} 56.69^{s}	+20° 29′ 46.6″	6.22	0.13	538	A2Vs	
HD 59059				59059	36340	07^{h} 28^{m} 47.26^{s}	+15° 06′ 35.5″	6.23	−0.63	769	B9IV	
HD 61630				61630	37404	07^{h} 40^{m} 47.19^{s}	+13° 46′ 16.6″	6.23	−1.28	1035	K0	
9 Gem		9	PX	43384	29840	06^{h} 16^{m} 58.71^{s}	+23° 44′ 27.3″	6.24	−2.79	2090	B3Ia	α Cyg variable, V_{max} = 6.23^{m}, V_{min} = 6.30^{m}, P = 13.70 d
HD 45506				45506	30815	06^{h} 28^{m} 28.11^{s}	+16° 14′ 18.6″	6.24	2.19	210	G5	
HD 62141				62141	37636	07^{h} 43^{m} 22.20^{s}	+22° 23′ 58.0″	6.25	1.38	307	K0III	
20 Gem		20		46136	31158	06^{h} 32^{m} 18.52^{s}	+17° 47′ 03.4″	6.26	1.08	354	F6V...	
HD 51330				51330	33465	06^{h} 57^{m} 25.59^{s}	+11° 54′ 27.2″	6.26		3070	F2Ib-II	
HD 47863				47863	32020	06^{h} 41^{m} 21.94^{s}	+16° 23′ 51.6″	6.28	−0.63	786	A1V	
HD 53899				53899	34428	07^{h} 08^{m} 13.28^{s}	+33° 49′ 56.8″	6.31	−0.75	840	K1	
HD 44234				44234	30218	06^{h} 21^{m} 25.91^{s}	+17° 45′ 49.0″	6.32	0.78	417	G9:III:	
HD 44780				44780	30501	06^{h} 24^{m} 43.75^{s}	+25° 02′ 55.4″	6.35	−0.68	832	K2III	
HD 49059				49059	32539	06^{h} 47^{m} 23.46^{s}	+18° 11′ 36.8″	6.35	0.74	431	A2V	
141 Tau		(141)		40724	28561	06^{h} 01^{m} 41.63^{s}	+22° 24′ 03.8″	6.36	0.09	584	B8V	
HD 58898				58898	36325	07^{h} 28^{m} 39.89^{s}	+27° 33′ 10.4″	6.36	1.39	321	K2III	
HD 61035				61035	37165	07^{h} 38^{m} 14.36^{s}	+24° 21′ 37.4″	6.37	3.01	153	F0	
19 Gem		19		46031	31105	06^{h} 31^{m} 37.44^{s}	+15° 54′ 12.7″	6.38	1.33	334	A8V	
HD 56176				56176	35253	07^{h} 17^{m} 03.36^{s}	+26° 41′ 23.3″	6.38	1.59	296	G7IV	
40 Gem		40		51688	33650	06^{h} 59^{m} 27.94^{s}	+25° 54′ 51.1″	6.40	−1.43	1199	B8III	
OT Gem			OT	58050	35933	07^{h} 24^{m} 27.65^{s}	+15° 31′ 01.9″	6.41	−3.53	3170	B2Ve	γ Cas variable, V_{max} = 6^{m}, V_{min} = 6.44^{m}
HD 47415				47415	31850	06^{h} 39^{m} 31.47^{s}	+24° 35′ 59.8″	6.43	3.70	115	F8IV	
HD 54563				54563	34608	07^{h} 10^{m} 06.79^{s}	+21° 14′ 53.3″	6.43	3.11	150	G9V	
HD 47020				47020	31650	06^{h} 37^{m} 27.29^{s}	+24° 35′ 27.0″	6.44	0.33	543	A3V	
25 Gem		25		47731	32019	06^{h} 41^{m} 20.90^{s}	+28° 11′ 47.9″	6.45	−1.73	1411	G5Ib	
HD 57049				57049	35548	07^{h} 20^{m} 06.84^{s}	+15° 08′ 34.7″	6.45	−1.18	1094	A2Vn	
50 Gem		50		55130	34860	07^{h} 12^{m} 49.08^{s}	+27° 13′ 30.2″	6.46	3.24	144	F8V	spectroscopic binary; suspected variable, V_{max} = 6.43^{m}, V_{min} = 6.46^{m}
32 Gem		32		48843	32404	06^{h} 45^{m} 54.20^{s}	+12° 41′ 36.8″	6.47	−1.25	1140	A9III	
HD 53744				53744	34367	07^{h} 07^{m} 24.88^{s}	+28° 10′ 36.1″	6.47	0.34	549	B9V	
HD 54986				54986	34763	07^{h} 11^{m} 46.84^{s}	+16° 58′ 35.1″	6.50	−1.14	1098	K5	
6 Gem		6	BU	42543	29450	06^{h} 12^{m} 19.10^{s}	+22° 54′ 30.7″	6.51	−4.09	4289	M1Ia-ab	semiregular variable, V_{max} = 5.74^{m}, V_{min} = 7.4^{m}, P = 325 d
79 Gem		79		62510	37811	07^{h} 45^{m} 09.34^{s}	+20° 18′ 57.8″	6.53	0.78	460	A1V	
15 Gem A		15		45352	30757	06^{h} 27^{m} 46.58^{s}	+20° 47′ 22.6″	6.54	0.31	575	K0	
W Gem			W	46595	31404	06^{h} 34^{m} 57.45^{s}	+15° 19′ 49.7″	6.54			F5-G1	classical Cepheid, V_{max} = 6.54^{m}, V_{min} = 7.38^{m}, P = 7.91 d
TV Gem			TV	42475	29416	06^{h} 11^{m} 51.41^{s}	+21° 52′ 05.6″	6.56		3100	M1Iab	semiregular variable, V_{max} = 6.27^{m}, V_{min} = 7.5^{m}, P = 229 d
10 Gem		10		43740	30003	06^{h} 18^{m} 54.43^{s}	+23° 36′ 11.9″	6.58	−0.34	789	G5	
HD 45314			PZ	45314	30722	06^{h} 27^{m} 15.78^{s}	+14° 53′ 21.22″	6.64			O9:pe	Be star
2 Gem		2		41543	28969	06^{h} 06^{m} 48.66^{s}	+23° 38′ 19.0″	6.67	−0.45	867	K0	
23 Gem		23		46781	31525	06^{h} 36^{m} 02.12^{s}	+16° 47′ 49.5″	6.73	2.25	257	F5	
OU Gem			OU	45088	30630	06^{h} 26^{m} 10.25^{s}	+18° 45′ 24.9″	6.76		48.02	K3Vk	BY Dra variable, ΔV = 0.05^{m}
HD 60848			BN	60848	37074	07^{h} 37^{m} 05.73^{s}	+16° 54′ 15.3″	6.85		1960	O8V:pev	γ Cas variable, V_{max} = 6.75^{m}, V_{min} = 6.85^{m}
HD 50554				50554	33212	06^{h} 54^{m} 42.83^{s}	+24° 14′ 44.0″	6.86	4.40	101	F8V	has a planet (b)
4 Gem		4		42216	29288	06^{h} 10^{m} 29.94^{s}	+22° 59′ 52.4″	6.88	−0.21	853	B9	
11 Gem		11	LU	43818	30046	06^{h} 19^{m} 19.30^{s}	+23° 28′ 09.9″	6.91	−2.28	2248	B0II	β Cep variable
12 Gem		12		43836	30049	06^{h} 19^{m} 22.52^{s}	+23° 16′ 28.2″	6.95		2530	A0II	
HD 63433				63433	38228	07^{h} 49^{m} 55.0^{s}	+27° 21′ 48″	6.9		73.0		has three planets (b, c, and D)
49 Gem		49		55156	34861	07^{h} 12^{m} 49.38^{s}	+25° 44′ 55.3″	7.05	−0.01	842	A0	
HD 52961			PS	52961	34038	07^{h} 03^{m} 39.63^{s}	+10° 46′ 13.1″	7.37			A0	RV Tau variable, V_{max} = 7.24^{m}, V_{min} = 7.58^{m}, P = 72 d
WY Gem			WY	42474	29425	06^{h} 11^{m} 56.25^{s}	+23° 12′ 25.4″	7.38			M2Iabep+B	slow irregular variable and eclipsing binary, V_{max} = 7.10^{m}, V_{min} = 7.56^{m}, P = 23550 d
R Gem			R	53791	34356	07^{h} 07^{m} 21.40^{s}	+22° 42′ 13.0″	7.68	1.65	525	S3.5-6.5/6e	technetium star; Mira variable, V_{max} = 6.0^{m}, V_{min} = 14.0^{m}, P = 369.91 d
ν Gem B	ν	18		257937		06^{h} 28^{m} 53.70^{s}	+20° 14′ 20.0″	8.00				
HD 67087				67087	39767	08^{h} 07^{m} 40.0^{s}	+31° 33′ 05″	8.05		290	F8V	has two planets (b & c)
HD 59643			NQ	59643	36623	07^{h} 31^{m} 54.52^{s}	+24° 30′ 12.6″	8.01		2860	C6,2eV	Z And and semiregular variable, V_{max} = 7.4^{m}, V_{min} = 8.18^{m}, P = 58.2 d
V345 Gem			V345	60987	37197	07^{h} 38^{m} 30.23^{s}	+33° 42′ 41.5″	8.2		528	F0	W UMa variable
15 Gem B		15		257498	30756	06^{h} 27^{m} 45.94^{s}	+20° 46′ 59.6″	8.59	7.31	59	G0	
SS Gem			SS	41870		06^{h} 08^{m} 35.11^{s}	+22° 37′ 01.9″	8.67			G2/5I	RV Tau variable, V_{max} = 8.48^{m}, V_{min} = 9.70^{m}, P = 89.44 d
CR Gem			CR		31349	06^{h} 34^{m} 23.92^{s}	+16° 04′ 30.3″	8.67		1140	Cv+...	semiregular variable
RY Gem			RY	58713	36209	07^{h} 27^{m} 24.17^{s}	+15° 39′ 34.7″	8.68		1330	A2V+ K-03IV-V	Algol variable, V_{max} = 8.69^{m}, V_{min} = 11.04^{m}, P = 9.30 d
RX Gem			RX	49521	32791	06^{h} 50^{m} 11.54^{s}	+33° 14′ 20.7″	9.24		1520	A2	Algol variable, V_{max} = 9.2^{m}, V_{min} = 10.81^{m}, P = 12.21 d
TU Gem			TU	42272		06^{h} 10^{m} 53.10^{s}	+26° 00′ 53.4″	9.40			C6,4	semiregular variable, V_{max} = 6.88^{m}, V_{min} = 8.0^{m}, P = 217 d
Castor C	α	66	YY	60179C		07^{h} 34^{m} 37.58^{s}	+31° 52′ 11.1″	9.64	8.79	52	dM1e+dM1e	Algol variable and flare star; V_{max} = 8.91^{m}, V_{min} = 9.6^{m}, P = 0.81 d
RW Gem			RW	250371	28537	06^{h} 01^{m} 28.06^{s}	+23° 08′ 27.5″	9.79		438	B6V	Algol variable, V_{max} = 9.53^{m}, V_{min} = 11.76^{m}, P = 2.87 d
AD Gem			AD	262433	32180	06^{h} 43^{m} 07.51^{s}	+20° 56′ 20.8″	9.80			F5	classical Cepheid, V_{max} = 9.45^{m}, V_{min} = 10.23^{m}, P = 3.79 d
AL Gem			AL	266913		06^{h} 57^{m} 38.55^{s}	+20° 53′ 32.5″	9.89			F6V	Algol variable, V_{max} = 9.8^{m}, V_{min} = 10.39^{m}, P = 1.39 d
BD+20°1790			V429			07^{h} 23^{m} 43.59^{s}	+20° 24′ 58.7″	10.00		85	K5Ve	BY Dra variable, V_{max} = 9.86^{m}, V_{min} = 10.08^{m}, P = 2.80 d
Gliese 251				265866	33226	06^{h} 54^{m} 48.96^{s}	+33° 16′ 05.4″	10.11		18.215	M3.0V	Has two planets.
AF Gem			AF	264750		06^{h} 50^{m} 39.64^{s}	+21° 21′ 55.9″	10.58			A0	Algol variable, V_{max} = 10.54^{m}, V_{min} = 11.83^{m}, P = 1.24 d
DX Gem			DX		31306	06^{h} 33^{m} 54.61^{s}	+14° 28′ 17.0″	10.73				classical Cepheid, V_{max} = 10.53^{m}, V_{min} = 10.92^{m}, P = 3.14 d
HD 262389				262389		07^{h} 23^{m} 43.59^{s}	+20° 24′ 58.7″	10.91		1013	F	HAT-P-56, has a transiting planet (b)
HD 51585			OY	51585		06^{h} 58^{m} 30.41^{s}	+16° 19′ 26.2″	11.20			Bpe	Be star, V_{max} = 11.07^{m}, V_{min} = 11.37^{m}
ZZ Gem			ZZ	44653		06^{h} 24^{m} 01.24^{s}	+25° 01′ 52.9″	11.2			Ce	Mira variable, V_{max} = 8.3^{m}, V_{min} = 11.2^{m}, P = 314.5 d
HAT-P-20						07^{h} 27^{m} 40^{s}	+24° 20′ 11″	11.34		228	K7	has a transiting planet (b)
HAT-P-39						07^{h} 35^{m} 02.0^{s}	+17° 49′ 48″	11.42		2094		has a transiting planet (b)
BM Gem			BM	57160	35617	07^{h} 20^{m} 59.01^{s}	+24° 59′ 58.1″	11.50		2590	N	semiregular variable
HAT-P-24						07^{h} 15^{m} 18^{s}	+14° 15′ 44″	11.82		998	F8	has a transiting planet (b)
HAT-P-33						07^{h} 32^{m} 44^{s}	+33° 50′ 06″	11.89		1367	F	has a transiting planet (b)
RR Gem			RR		35667	07^{h} 21^{m} 33.53^{s}	+30° 52′ 59.5″	11.92			A8	RR Lyr variable, V_{max} = 10.62^{m}, V_{min} = 11.99^{m}, P = 0.40 d
HAT-P-54						06^{h} 39^{m} 35.5^{s}	+25° 28′ 57″	13.51		443	K	has a transiting planet (b)
BG Gem			BG			06^{h} 03^{m} 30.81^{s}	+27° 51′ 50.7″					β Lyr variable
PQ Gem			PQ			07^{h} 51^{m} 17.32^{s}	+14° 44′ 23.9″	13.7			CV	intermediate polar, V_{max} = 13.7^{m}, V_{min} = 14.5^{m}, P = 0.22 d
U Gem			U	64511		07^{h} 55^{m} 05.24^{s}	+22° 00′ 05.1″	14.9		413	sd:Be+...	prototype dwarf nova (SS Cyg) and eclipsing binary, V_{max} = 8.2^{m}, V_{min} = 14.9^{m}, P = 0.18 d
DN Gem			DN	50480		06^{h} 54^{m} 54.35^{s}	+32° 08′ 28.0″	15.0				nova
DM Gem			DM	48328		06^{h} 44^{m} 12.05^{s}	+29° 56′ 41.9″	17.4				nova, V_{max} = 4.8^{m}, V_{min} = 17.4^{m}, P = 0.12 d
2MASSW J0746425+200032						07^{h} 46^{m} 42.56^{s}	+20° 00′ 32.2″	17.7		37.8	L0.5	binary brown dwarf
IR Gem			IR			06^{h} 47^{m} 34.68^{s}	+28° 06′ 22.3″	18.7				SU UMa variable, V_{max} = 11.2^{m}, V_{min} = 18.7^{m}, P = 0.068 d
WD J0651+2844						06^{h} 51^{m} 33.34^{s}	+28° 44′ 23.4″					binary white dwarf
AW Gem			AW			07^{h} 22^{m} 41.0^{s}	+28° 30′ 17″	19.4				SU UMa variable, V_{max} = 12.9^{m}, V_{min} = 19.4^{m}, P = 0.076 d
PSR B0656+14						06^{h} 59^{m} 48.13^{s}	+14° 14′ 21.5″	24.90				pulsar
PSR J0751+1807						07^{h} 51^{m} 09.16^{s}	+18° 07′ 38.6″					binary pulsar/white dwarf
WISEP J060738.65+242953.4						06^{h} 07^{m} 39.08^{s}	+24° 29′ 57.5″			25.4	L9	brown dwarf
Geminga						06^{h} 33^{m} 54.15^{s}	+17° 46′ 12.9″					pulsar
CXOU J061705.3+222127						06^{h} 17^{m} 05.3^{s}	+22° 21′ 27″					pulsar
PSR B0611+22						06^{h} 14^{m} 17.25^{s}	+22° 30′ 37.4″					pulsar
Table legend: • Name = Proper name • B = Bayer designation • F or/and G. = Flamsteed designation or Gould designation • Var = Variable star designation • HD = Henry Draper Catalogue designation number • HIP = Hipparcos Catalogue designation number • RA = Right ascension for the Epoch/Equinox J2000.0 • Dec = Declination for the Epoch/Equinox J2000.0 • vis. mag. = visual magnitude (m or m_{v}), also known as apparent magnitude • abs. mag. = absolute magnitude (M_{v}) • Dist. (ly) = Distance in light-years from Earth • Sp. class = Spectral class of the star in the stellar classification system • Notes = Common name(s) or alternate name(s); comments; notable properties [for example: multiple star status, range of variability if it is a variable star, exoplanets, etc.]

== See also ==
- List of stars by constellation
