= 91 Aquarii b =

Extrasolar planet

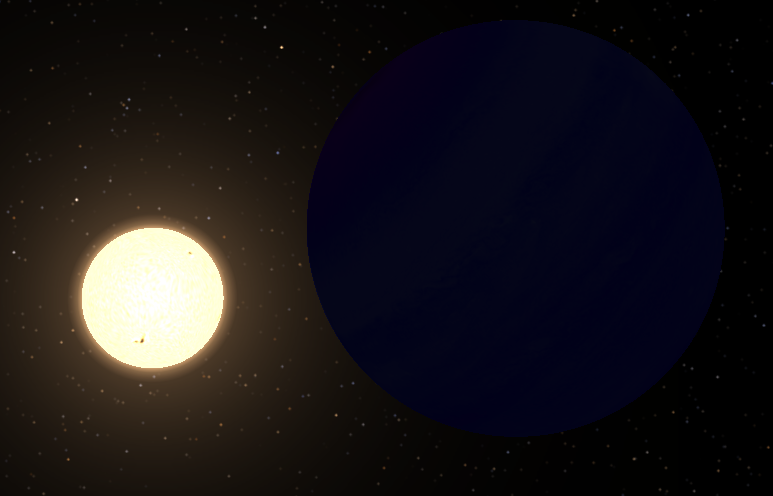
- Artist's conception of planet orbiting ψ^{1} Aquarii

Discovery
- Discovered by: Mitchell et al.
- Discovery site: United States
- Discovery date: 16 November 2013
- Detection method: Radial velocity

Orbital characteristics
- Semi-major axis: 0.7 AU (100 million km)
- Eccentricity: 0.027 ± 0.026
- Orbital period (sidereal): 181.4 ± 0.1 d
- Time of periastron: 11 April 2005; 2,453,472.1 ± 24
- Argument of periastron: 177.3 ± 0.8
- Semi-amplitude: 91.0 ± 2.3
- Star: 91 Aquarii

91 Aquarii b, also known as HD 219449 b, is an extrasolar planet orbiting in the 91 Aquarii system approximately 148 light-years away in the constellation of Aquarius. It orbits at the average distance of 105 million km from its star, which is slightly closer than Venus is to the Sun (108 million km). The planet takes half an Earth year to orbit around the star in a very circular orbit with eccentricity less than 0.053.

== See also ==
- HD 59686 b
- Iota Draconis b
