= Nu Octantis Ab =

Gas giant planet orbiting Nu Octantis A

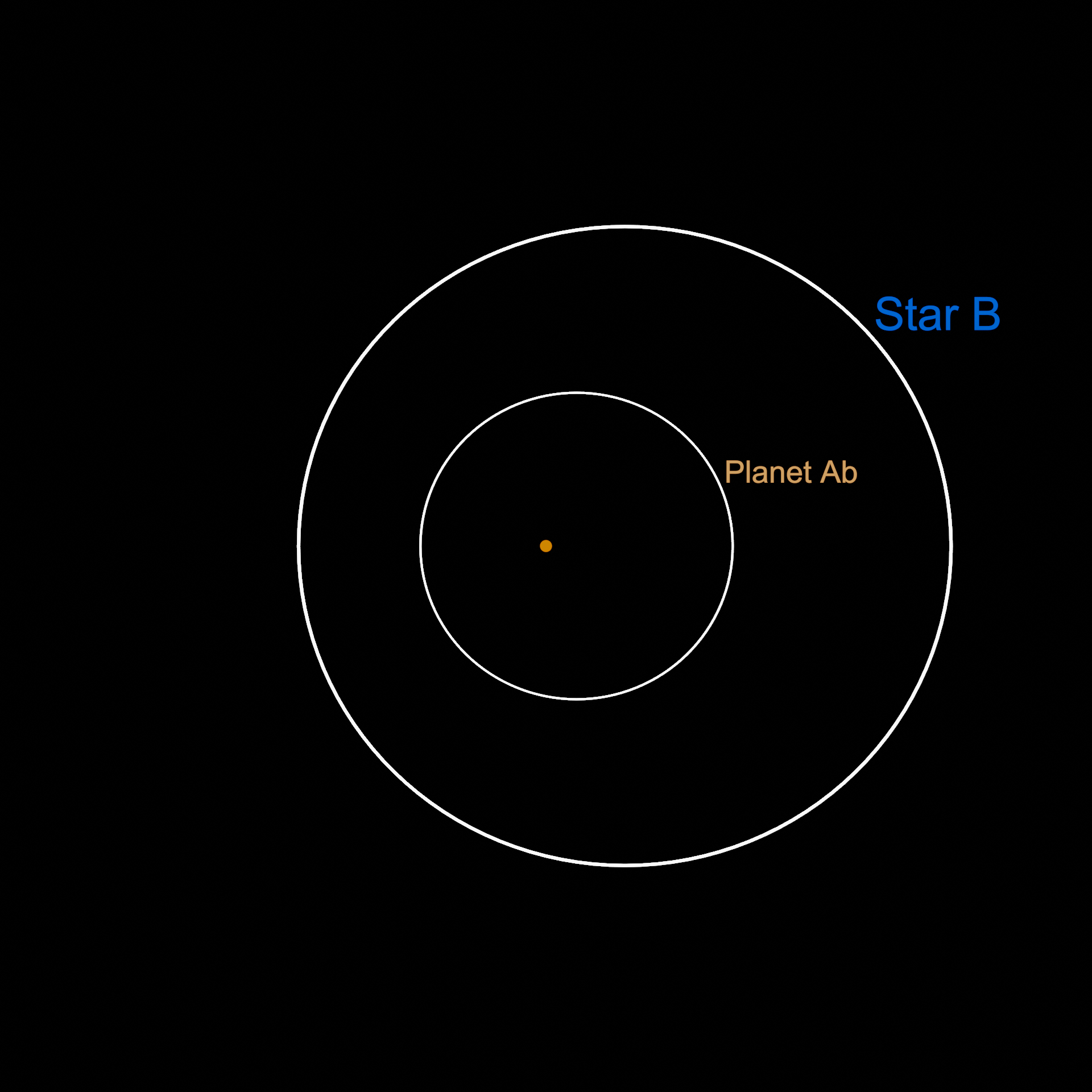
- Orbital configuration of the Nu Octantis system, centered on the subgiant primary.

Discovery
- Discovery date: April 2004 (first detection); April 2009 (suspected); May 2025 (confirmed)
- Detection method: Doppler spectroscopy (radial velocity method)

Designations
- Alternative names: ν Octantis Ab, ν Oct Ab

Orbital characteristics
- Semi-major axis: 1.24±0.02 AU
- Eccentricity: 0.195+0.050 −0.037
- Orbital period (sidereal): 402.4+7.7 −6.0 days (1.102+0.021 −0.016 years)
- Inclination: 108.2°
- Longitude of ascending node: 266.5°
- Argument of perihelion: 100°+32° −15°
- Semi-amplitude: 42.7+2.6 −1.6 m/s
- Star: Nu Octantis A

Physical characteristics
- Mass: 2.19±0.11 M_{J}

Nu Octantis Ab (ν Octantis Ab) is a gas giant exoplanet. It is orbiting around the subgiant star Nu Octantis A, which is part of a binary star system. Nu Octantis Ab was discovered by analysing periodic oscillations on its host star's radial velocity, the so-called radial velocity method. This planet is notable for its unusual orbit, which lies halfway between the orbit of the two stars in the Nu Octantis system. Such orbital configuration is problematic, since gravitational perturbations with the secondary star would make its orbit unstable, and current models for planetary formation preclude the formation of a planet on such an orbit.

It was initially discovered in 2009, but due to difficulties on the stability and formation, the planet has been disputed by multiple studies. However, alternative explanations for the observed variations in radial velocity have been discredited or weakened, and in 2025 a study reported the confirmation of the planet's existence.

As of 2025, stable orbits have been found, but these imply a retrograde orbit relative to the binary's motion, making more difficult an explanation to the formation of a planet on such a tight orbit. Two hypotheses have been proposed, and are based on the secondary being a white dwarf that lost mass during its evolution, leading to the instability of a former planetary system on a circumbinary orbit, or the formation of a planet via an accretion disk made up of the lost mass.

== Characteristics ==
A retrograde orbit. In this trajectory, the planet only encounters the secondary star for part of its orbit, while in a prograde orbit it would follow the star, making gravitational disturbances more constant.

Based on its mass of 2.19 Jupiter masses (M_{J}), Nu Octantis Ab is classified as a gas giant, a category of planets like Jupiter or Saturn which are made of gases such as hydrogen and helium around a solid core, and have no surface like the terrestrial planets. Since this planet was detected only by the indirect Doppler spectroscopy method, which is based on mass, other properties like size and density are unknown.

Nu Octantis Ab takes 404 days (1.11 years) to complete an orbit and has a semi-major axis of 1.24±0.02 astronomical units or 1.24 times the Earth-Sun distance, and equivalent to 47.5% of the binary's semi-major axis. This is the highest ratio ever reported. All other S-type planets, orbiting one component of a star system, have much smaller orbits relative to that of the outer star. Nu Octantis Ab therefore is exceptional due to its tight architecture.

Nu Octantis Ab is orbiting retrograde relative to the orbit of Nu Octantis A and B. If it were prograde (i.e. same direction), the orbit would be highly unstable since strong gravitational perturbations of the secondary star would eject it from its current position. The orbital inclination relative to Earth is 108.2°, somewhat coplanar with the binary star's inclnation of 71.8°. The eccentricity is low, at 0.2.

== Host star ==
Nu Octantis A is a subgiant star, which is exhausting the hydrogen at its core and expanding in size; currently it is 5.04 times larger than the Sun, and 13 times more luminous. It lies in the constellation of Octans, which contains the southern celestial pole, and due to its location close to this pole, is invisible to most of the Northern Hemisphere. At a moderate apparent magnitude of 3.73, it is the brightest star of this rather faint constellation, despite its Bayer designation.

It is part of a binary star system, and dominates the energy output of the system: The secondary, a white dwarf, is much less luminous, and could only be detected from indirect methods such as spectroscopy or astrometry. Initially both stellar components were separated by 1.31±0.07 AU and had masses of 1.38+0.04
−0.03 solar masses (M_{☉}) and 2.36+0.13
−0.15 M_{☉}. Around 900 million years after formation, the secondary started to exhaust hydrogen at its core, expanded to a red giant, and then became the current white dwarf. During this process, the orbit become wider, to 2.61±0.03 AU, and the secondary lost most of its original mass (around 1.8 M_{☉}, of which 0.2 M_{☉} were accreted to the primary).

The names Nu Octantis A, Nu Octantis B, and Nu Octantis Ab, derive from the convention used by the Washington Multiplicity Catalog (WMC) for multiple star systems, and adopted by the International Astronomical Union (IAU).

== Proposed formation scenarios ==
Based on the current knowledge of planetary formation, it is impossible that Nu Oct Ab formed on its current orbit and at the same time the stellar components formed; the nature of the secondary star implies a closer primordial orbit, and the planet's retrograde orbit does not fit the model. The primordial ν Oct A and ν Oct B are estimated to be separated by 1.31 AU, almost the same value of the planet's separation of 1.24±0.02 AU, implying it could not form in this situation. Planets form by the accretion of planetesimals in a primordial protoplanetary disk, but in this system the binary precluded the formation and evolution of such a disk. The size of a protoplanetary disk around either star should be less than 0.41 and 0.52 AU, respectively, regions so close and so hot that the gas temperature is too high to form a gas giant planet.

Two theories that explain the formation of ν Oct Ab were raised in a 2025 study by Ho Wan Cheng et al. These theories are based on the evolution of the system, whose secondary component was initially more massive, but during its transition from main sequence star to a red giant, and then its death as a white dwarf, it lost significant part of its mass. Less mass in the system result in less gravitational force.

=== Planet-planet scattering ===
This theory proposes that two circumbinary planets (which orbit both stars on a wider orbit) existed. These planets had a stable orbit until ν Oct B evolved to a white dwarf. During the mass loss, the orbits of both planets expanded by about 75%, while the planet-planet separation decreased by 17%. This smaller separation made the planetary system unstable, leading to the one of them being ejected to its current, retrograde orbit.

=== Second generation formation ===
This theory proposes that Nu Oct B's transition from a red giant to a white dwarf led to the formation of an accretion disk around Nu Oct A with properties resembling a protoplanetary disk. Depending on the disk's inclination, it could have been retrograde and coplanar relative to the binary's motion, or was forced to this configuration via the Kozai mechanism.

== Discovery and follow-up studies ==
Diagram showing how an extrasolar planet orbiting a star could produce changes in position and velocity of the latter as they orbit their common center of mass (red cross).

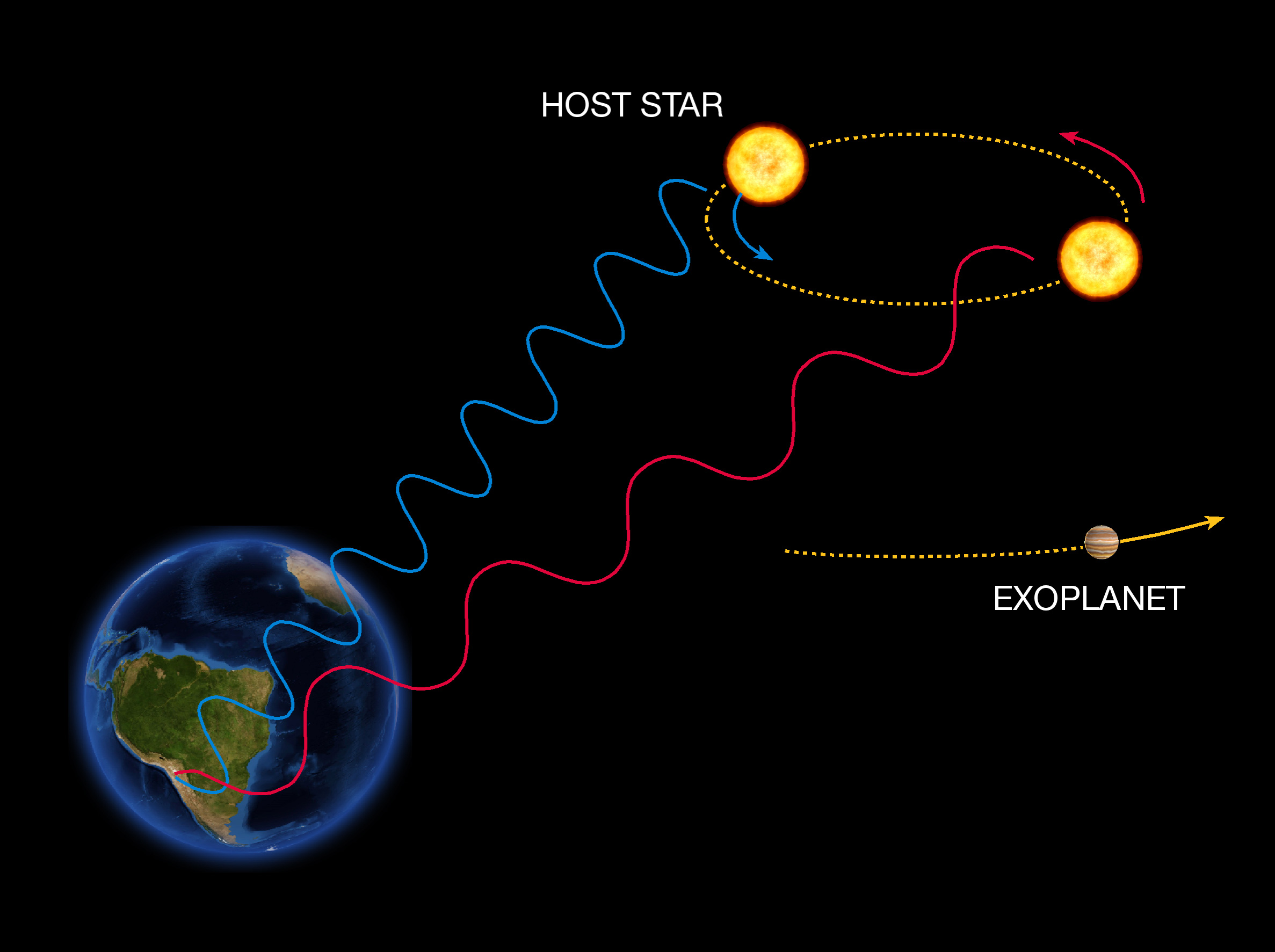
Doppler spectroscopy detects periodic shifts in radial velocity by recording variations in the color of light from the host star. When a star moves towards the Earth, its spectrum is blueshifted, while it is redshifted when it moves away from the Earth. By analyzing these spectral shifts, astronomers can deduce the gravitational influence of extrasolar planets.

The first detection of the exoplanet was presented in a 2004 PhD thesis by David J. Ramm. At this time Nu Octantis was already known to be a spectroscopic (radial velocity) binary, with an orbital period of 1,037 days (2.84 years). Using radial velocity observations, he detected additional periodic radial velocity variations at a period of 400 days (1.1 years), which was unexpected for a such a stable star. The variations in radial velocity happen due to the Doppler effect, and are observed in the star's spectral lines. At the time, that periodicity was attributed to the rotation of a starspot.

In 2009, Ramm and three more astronomers published in a scientific journal on the radial velocity variations. The researchers found that intrinsic variability, stellar activity or even starspots were not convincing explanations for the variations, leaving the orbital motion of an exoplanet as a plausible scenario. The data suggested a minimum mass of 2.4 M_{J}, and an orbit in 5.2 resonance with ν Oct B, having a low eccentricity and a separation of 1.3 AU. Despite this, the researchers suggest a planet on the proposed orbit would be unlikely: It would be unstable due to gravitational perturbations of the secondary star, and models of planetary formation do not allow the formation of a planet on such orbit. Even then, the astronomers suggested the planet could still exist, since subsequent research could revise the system's dynamical stability.

In October 2010, a study by J. Eberle and M. Cuntz found that if the planet's orbit were retrograde relative to the movement of the companion star, it would be stable for at least 10 million years. This discovery meant that the existence of Nu Octantis Ab could still be a possibility.

The planet was again challenged in a January 2012 study by M. H. M. Morais and A. C. M. Correia. Their analysis found the binary star's orbit is precessing at a rate of −0.86 °/yr (i.e. retrograde precession). For the precession to be explained by the planet, its inclination relative to the binary's orbit should be over 45°, but the researchers did not find a stable orbit on such inclination. This raised the possibility that ν Oct B is actually a close binary, and the precession due to this binary system could provide an alternative explanation to the radial velocity variations on ν Oct A, as opposed to a planet. More radial velocity observations were needed to decide which explanation is correct.

A March 2013 study by Krzysztof Gozdziewski and other three astronomers also challenged the planet's existence based on stability concerns.

In 2015, Ramm tested the hypotheses of starspots or stellar pulsations being the cause of the observed variations by measuring the star's surface temperature multiple times. His results show that neither hypothesis is credible: The 215 measurements of temperature were found to be nearly equal, which is consistent with lack of variability. He also noted the hypothesis gathered by Morans and Correia has no observational support, and thus is unlikely. However, the stability concerns remained, and Ramm suggested a more exotic hypothesis, in which ν Oct A is variable, but its variability is only visible as radial velocity variations, albeit the quality of the observations was insufficient to validate it.

In 2016, Ramm and eight other astronomers published an updated study with more radial velocity observations. The alternative hypothesis gathered by Morais & Correia was ruled out, with a much smaller and prograde precession being found, as well as no evidence for a third star. The study found an orbital configuration that is stable for at least 100 million years. The presence of a retrograde planet is the best scenario as per the updated data, but its formation on the current orbit would be highly unlikely. As of such, the researchers raised exotic alternative possibilities, such as ν Oct Ab being captured from another star system.

A 2021 study by Ramm and six other astronomers, analysing photometry from the Hipparcos, TESS and Gaia satellites, as well as spectroscopic data, again disfavour non-planetary explanations for the RV variations, further supporting the existence of the planet. In particular, the star does not show any photometric, nor other spectroscopic variability. The study also posited that ν Oct B could be a white dwarf rather than a main sequence star, a theory which has some evidence from observations taken in the 70s. If the companion is a white dwarf, the planet could have formed during the progenitor's transition from a red giant to a white dwarf, creating an accretion disk that formed the planet.

The planet would finally be confirmed in May 2025, by a study by Ho Wan Cheng and other six astronomers, including David Ramm. This study definitively ruled out any non-planetary hypothesis to the radial velocity variations, and 70% of their orbital configurations were stable for long timescales. Another discovery reported in this study is that the companion is a faint white dwarf, as adaptive optics failed to detect its brightness, further supporting the theory of second-generation formation that was raised by Ramm et al. (2021).

== See also ==
- HD 59686 Ab
- Gamma Cephei Ab
- Lists of planets
