= 74 Geminorum =

Giant star in the constellation Gemini

- Location of 74 Geminorum in Gemini (circled)

Observation data Epoch J2000 Equinox J2000
- Constellation: Gemini
- Right ascension: 07^{h} 39^{m} 28.593^{s}
- Declination: +17° 40′ 28.28″
- Apparent magnitude (V): 5.05

Characteristics
- Spectral type: K5.5III
- Apparent magnitude (U): 8.53
- Apparent magnitude (B): 6.61
- Apparent magnitude (G): 4.348±0.003
- Apparent magnitude (J): 2.11
- Apparent magnitude (H): 1.32
- Apparent magnitude (K): 1.14
- B−V color index: 1.616±0.007

Astrometry
| Radial velocity (R_{v}) | 25.38±0.19 km/s |
| Proper motion (μ) | RA: +5.374 mas/yr Dec.: −1.199 mas/yr |
| Parallax (π) | 5.1083±0.0964 mas |
| Distance | 640 ± 10 ly (196 ± 4 pc) |
| Absolute magnitude (M_{V}) | −1.01 |

Details
| Mass | 1.2 M_{☉} |
| Radius | 106 R_{☉} |
| Luminosity | 2,371 L_{☉} |
| Surface gravity (log g) | 1.06 cgs |
| Temperature | 3,919 K |
| Age | 1.9 Gyr |

Other designations
- f Gem, 74 Gem, BD+18 1701, HD 61338, HIP 37300, HR 2938, SAO 97120, PPM 124288, WDS J07395+1740AB, TIC 16134382, TYC 1365-2474-1, GSC 01365-02474, IRAS 07366+1747, IRC +20185, 2MASS J07392860+1740282, Gaia DR2 671137503843195392, Gaia DR3 671137503843195392

Database references
| SIMBAD | data |

74 Geminorum (f Geminorum) is a K-type giant star in the constellation Gemini. It is located about 640 light-years from Earth based on its Gaia DR3 parallax. The star is often subject to lunar occultations, allowing an accurate measurement of its angular diameter. It has an apparent magnitude of 5.05, making it faintly visible to the naked eye.

== Characteristics ==
Based on its spectral type of K5.5III, it is a star that has left the main sequence and evolved into a K-type giant star. It radiates over two thousand times the solar luminosity from its photosphere at an effective temperature of 3,919 K. The angular diameter, as measured by a lunar occultation, is 3.12±0.06 milliarcseconds. At the current distance of 163.1 pc (532 light-years), as measured by a Hipparcos parallax of 6.13 milliarcseconds, it gives a physical size of 89.6 R_{☉}.

74 Geminorum has an apparent magnitude of 5.05, making it visible to the naked eye only from locations with dark skies, far from light pollution. The absolute magnitude, i.e. the magnitude of the star if it was seen at 10 parsecs (33 ly), is -1.01. It is located in the coordinates RA 07^{h} 39^{m} 28.59^{s}, DEC +17° 40′ 28.3″, which is within the Gemini constellation. The star is moving away from Earth at a velocity of 25.38 km/s. f Geminorum is the star's Bayer designation. Other designations for the star include 74 Geminorum (the Flamsteed designation), HIP 37300 (from the Hipparcos catalogue), HR 2938 (from the Bright Star Catalogue) and HD 61338 (from the Henry Draper Catalogue).

The star is often subject to lunar occultations. One of these occultations were observed by the SAO RAS 6-m telescope, which allowed the angular diameter of 74 Geminorum to be accurately measured at 3.12±0.06 milliarcseconds.

== See also ==
- List of stars in Gemini
- Cancer Minor
