= HD 59686 =

Binary star system in the constellation Gemini

- Location of HD 59686 (circled in red)

Observation data Epoch J2000.0 Equinox ICRS
- Constellation: Gemini
- Right ascension: 07^{h} 31^{m} 48.40451^{s}
- Declination: +17° 05′ 09.7647″
- Apparent magnitude (V): +5.45

Characteristics
- Evolutionary stage: red clump
- Spectral type: K2III
- B−V color index: 1.126±0.006

Astrometry
Radial velocity (R_{v})	−33.35±0.15 km/s
Proper motion (μ)	RA: +39.385 mas/yr Dec.: −75.752 mas/yr
Parallax (π)	11.3298±0.0764 mas
Distance	288 ± 2 ly (88.3 ± 0.6 pc)
Absolute magnitude (M_{V})	0.52

Orbit
Period (P)	11,680+234 −173 d
Semi-major axis (a)	13.56+0.18 −0.14 AU
Eccentricity (e)	0.729+0.004 −0.003
Argument of periastron (ω) (secondary)	149.4±0.2°
Semi-amplitude (K_{1}) (primary)	4.014+0.010 −0.008 km/s

Details

A
Mass	1.43±0.23 M_{☉}
Radius	11.22±0.70 R_{☉}
Luminosity	57.5+14.9 −11.8 L_{☉}
Surface gravity (log g)	2.63±0.09 cgs
Temperature	4,670±34 K
Metallicity [Fe/H]	0.01±0.03 dex
Rotational velocity (v sin i)	1.03±0.23 km/s
Age	2.73±1.11 Gyr

B
Mass	≥0.53 M_{☉}

Other designations
- BD+17°1596, GC 10073, HD 59686, HIP 36616, HR 2877, SAO 96985, GSC 01364-01582

Database references
SIMBAD	data
Exoplanet Archive	data

HD 59686 is a binary star system in the northern constellation of Gemini. It is visible to the naked eye as a dim point of light with an apparent visual magnitude of +5.45. The distance to this system is approximately 288 light-years based on parallax, but it is drifting closer with a radial velocity of −33 km/s.

This is a single-lined spectroscopic binary system with an orbital period of 32.0 years and a high eccentricity of 0.73. The visible component is an aging giant star with a stellar classification of K2III. It is most likely fusing helium in its core in a position on the H-R diagram called the red clump. The stellar radius is very large: 11.2 times that of the Sun. The star is around 2.7 billion years old with 1.4 times the mass of the Sun. It is radiating 58 times the luminosity of the Sun from its enlarged photosphere at an effective temperature of 4,670 K.

The secondary component has a minimum mass 53% that of the Sun, which indicates it must be a star rather than a brown dwarf or a planet.

== Planetary system ==
The giant star HD 59686 A has one known planet, the gas giant HD 59686 Ab; it was discovered by Doppler spectroscopy and first announced in 2003, but the discovery was not formally published until 2016. HD 59686, along with Nu Octantis, is one of the closest binary star systems known to host a planet orbiting a single star.

The HD 59686 A planetary system
Companion (in order from star)	Mass	Semimajor axis (AU)	Orbital period (days)	Eccentricity	Inclination (°)	Radius
b	≥6.92+0.18 −0.24 M_{J}	1.0860+0.0006 −0.0007	299.36+0.26 −0.31	0.05+0.03 −0.02	—	—
