= Rho Geminorum =

Star system in the constellation Gemini

ρ Geminorum ABE
- Location of ρ Geminorum (circled)

Observation data Epoch J2000.0 Equinox ICRS
- Constellation: Gemini
- ρ Gem A
- Right ascension: 07^{h} 29^{m} 06.719^{s}
- Declination: +31° 47′ 04.38″
- Apparent magnitude (V): 4.2473±0.003
- ρ Gem B
- Right ascension: 07^{h} 29^{m} 06.0^{s}
- Declination: +31° 46′ 56″
- Apparent magnitude (V): 12.50
- ρ Gem E
- Right ascension: 07^{h} 29^{m} 01.769^{s}
- Declination: +31° 59′ 37.83″
- Apparent magnitude (V): 7.74

Characteristics

ρ Gem A
- Spectral type: F1V
- B−V color index: 0.320±0.012

ρ Gem E
- Spectral type: K2.5V
- B−V color index: 0.923±0.018
- Variable type: BY Dra

Astrometry

ρ Gem A
Radial velocity (R_{v})	−3.70±0.7 km/s
Proper motion (μ)	RA: 159.09±0.31 mas/yr Dec.: 193.29±0.18 mas/yr
Parallax (π)	55.41±0.24 mas
Distance	58.9 ± 0.3 ly (18.05 ± 0.08 pc)
Absolute magnitude (M_{V})	2.9

ρ Gem B
Absolute magnitude (M_{V})	10.6

ρ Gem E
Radial velocity (R_{v})	−3.95±0.1 km/s
Proper motion (μ)	RA: +158.169 mas/yr Dec.: +175.873 mas/yr
Parallax (π)	55.1857±0.0234 mas
Distance	59.10 ± 0.03 ly (18.121 ± 0.008 pc)
Absolute magnitude (M_{V})	6.5

Details

ρ Gem A
Mass	1.355±0.013 M_{☉}
Radius	1.655±0.028 R_{☉}
Luminosity	5.542±0.089 L_{☉}
Surface gravity (log g)	4.11±0.03 cgs
Temperature	6,899±63 K
Metallicity [Fe/H]	−0.25±0.04 dex
Rotational velocity (v sin i)	59.0±3.0 km/s
Age	2.1±0.2 Gyr

ρ Gem E
Mass	0.77 M_{☉}
Radius	0.77 R_{☉}
Luminosity	0.29 L_{☉}
Surface gravity (log g)	4.71±0.08 cgs
Temperature	4,948±41 K
Metallicity [Fe/H]	−0.06±0.08 dex

Other designations
- ρ Gem AB: 62 Geminorum, BD+32°1562, Gliese 274
- ρ Gem A: HD 58946, HIP 36366, HR 2852
- ρ Gem E: HIP 36357, BD+32°1561, Gliese 273.1, V376 Gem

Database references

ρ Gem A
SIMBAD	data

ρ Gem E
SIMBAD	data

Rho Geminorum (ρ Gem) is a star system that lies 59 light-years away in the constellation of Gemini, about 5 degrees west of Castor. The system consists of a primary bright enough to be seen with the naked eye, a faint secondary which has rarely been observed even professionally, and a distant, somewhat bright tertiary which requires telescopic equipment for observation.

== Components ==
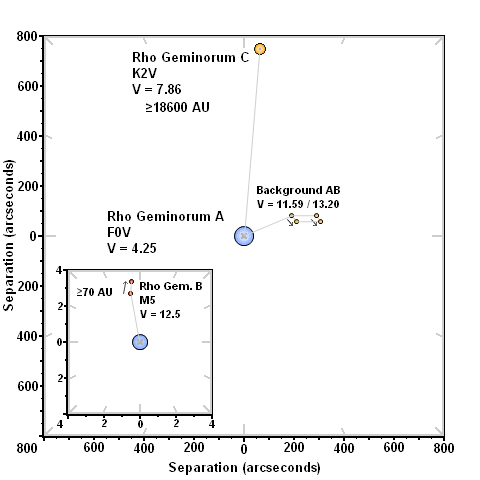
Diagram of Rho Geminorum and the four companions listed in the WDS

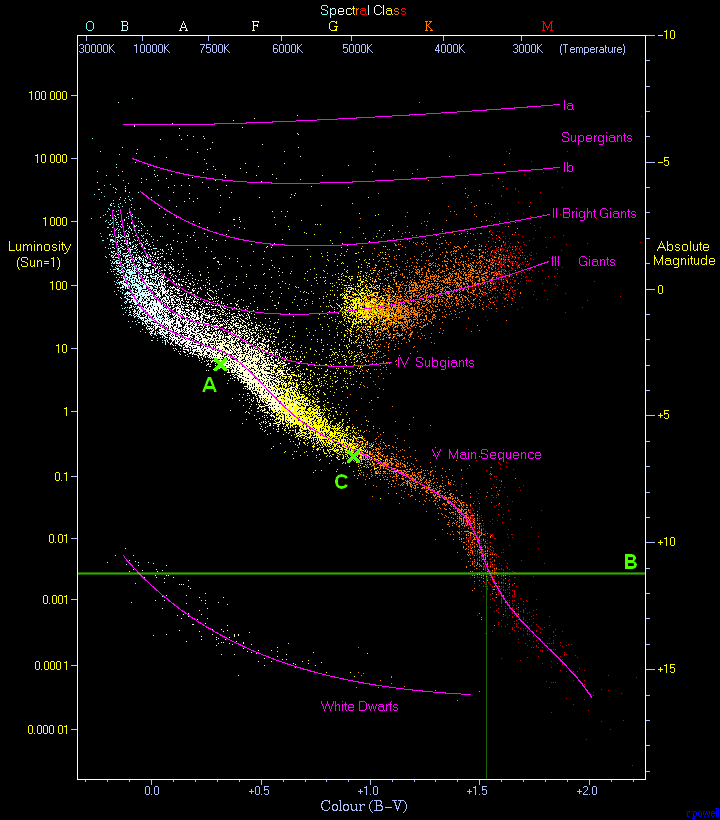
The positions of the three stars in the Rho Geminorum system on the Hertzsprung-Russell diagram. As Rho Geminorum B does not have a known B-V or temperature, a line through its absolute magnitude is drawn instead.

Rho Geminorum A has a spectral type F0V, meaning that it is a main sequence that is over a thousand kelvins hotter, one-third more massive, two-thirds larger and five-and-a-half times more luminous than the Sun. With an apparent magnitude of 4.25, it is approximately the seventeenth-brightest star in the constellation of Gemini.

The WDS lists four companions to Rho Geminorum A. Of these, surprisingly little is known about the closest companion, the magnitude 12.5 Rho Geminorum B. The most recent measurement lists a separation of 3.4 arcseconds, corresponding to a separation perpendicular to the line of sight of approximately 85 AU. Peculiarly, the five observations recorded in the WDS date between 1910 and 1935 and none have been made since; even in literature, more recent attempts to resolve Rho Geminorum B have been unsuccessful. The measurements listed in the WDS seem to be inconsistent with the star being in the background, so the reasons for the failure to observe Rho Geminorum B is unclear.

The next-closest companion, the magnitude 11.59 WDS 07291+3147 C, had a much larger separation of 211.6 arcseconds in 1886. However, this separation increased by 10 arcseconds by 2001, indicating that it is a background star that is unrelated to Rho Geminorum. Correcting for Rho Geminorum A's proper motion, this star's proper motion is RA = -19 mas/yr and Dec = -55 mas/yr. This is a modestly large value, consistent with a distance of a few hundred light-years. WDS 07291+3147 C is itself listed as having a companion, the magnitude 13.20 WDS 07291+3147 D. Relative to WDS 07291+3147 C its separation has remained at about 100 arcseconds between 1909 and 2001, indicating similar proper motion. While this would indicate that the two stars are bound, at a large distance this separation would indicate a separation of at least several thousand AU and their mutual separation has not been entirely consistent (the position angle has increased from 267 to 270°, and the separation has decreased from 104.1 to 102.3 arcseconds). It is therefore possible that the two background stars are bound, but it is not certain.

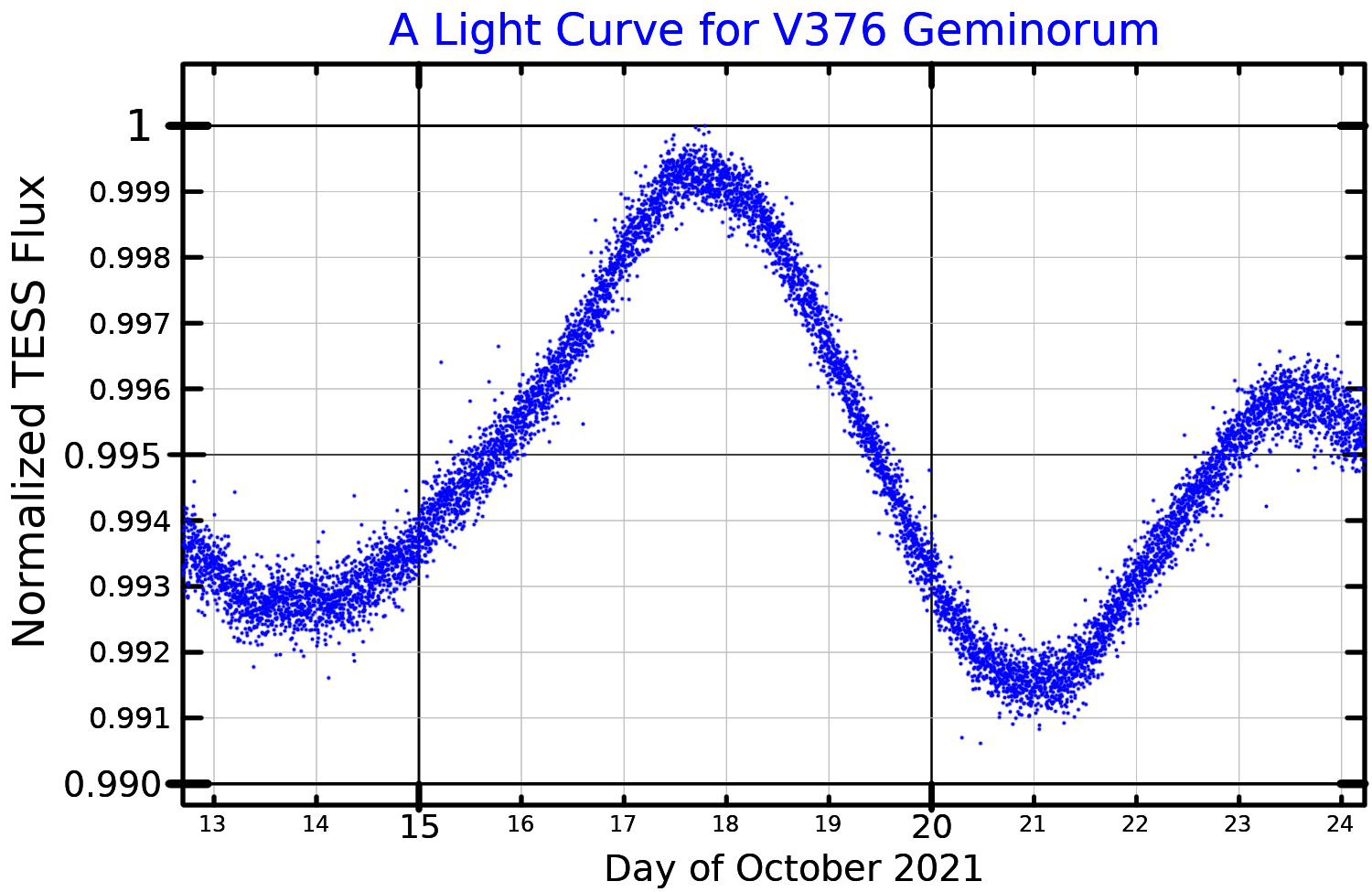
A light curve for V376 Geminorum, plotted from TESS data covering a single 11.63 day period.

The final companion in the WDS, the magnitude 7.86 WDS 07291+3147 E, has a larger still separation of 756 arcseconds, translating to a separation perpendicular to the line of sight of about 18600 AU. The position of this star relative to the primary has remained consistent over decades, indicating that it has a common proper motion and is therefore a wide tertiary component. The wide separation has also facilitated for observations without contamination from Rho Geminorum A, and as such component E has its own Gliese catalogue number (273.1) and Hipparcos catalogue number (36357). The Hipparcos parallax is consistent with that of the primary to 1σ, leading to a probability that they are bound of approximately 100%. The star is also known to be a BY Draconis variable with a period of 11.63 days, caused by varying brightness as starspots move across the stellar surface across its rotation period. While the derived age for Rho Geminorum A of 2.1 billion years is not particularly young, component E is still very active: It has an S'_{HK} of about 0.5, a value similar to that of the near-analogous Epsilon Eridani whose Log R'_{HK} is -4.45. This is much higher than a "quiet" value of <-4.8, which would make component E bizarrely active for a modestly old star.

The Rho Geminorum system is an interesting look into a system architecture similar to the 40 Eridani system while the most massive component is on the main sequence, before becoming a white dwarf.
