= Pi Geminorum =

Star in the constellation Gemini

π Geminorum
- Location of π Geminorum (circled)

Observation data Epoch J2000.0 Equinox J2000.0 (ICRS)
- Constellation: Gemini
- Right ascension: 07^{h} 47^{m} 30.32300^{s}
- Declination: +33° 24′ 56.5034″
- Apparent magnitude (V): 5.14

Characteristics
- Evolutionary stage: AGB
- Spectral type: M1 IIIa
- U−B color index: +1.90
- B−V color index: +1.59
- Variable type: suspected

Astrometry
Radial velocity (R_{v})	−13.36±0.34 km/s
Proper motion (μ)	RA: -19.59 mas/yr Dec.: -29.33 mas/yr
Parallax (π)	4.93±0.32 mas
Distance	660 ± 40 ly (200 ± 10 pc)
Absolute magnitude (M_{V})	−1.04

Details
Mass	1.1 M_{☉}
Radius	57 R_{☉}
Luminosity	676 L_{☉}
Surface gravity (log g)	0.90 cgs
Temperature	3,915 K
Metallicity [Fe/H]	0.07 dex

Other designations
- π Gem, 80 Geminorum, BD+33°1585, FK5 296, HD 62898, HIP 38016, HR 3013, SAO 60340.

Database references
SIMBAD	data

π Geminorum (Latinised as Pi Geminorum, abbreviated to π Gem or pi Gem) is a star located in the constellation Gemini, to the north of Castor. With an apparent visual magnitude of 5.14, it is faintly visible to the naked eye on a dark night. Based upon an annual parallax shift of 4.93 mas, Pi Geminorum is located roughly 660 light years from the Sun. At that distance, the visual magnitude of the star is diminished by an interstellar absorption factor of 0.033 due to interstellar dust.

This is an evolved red giant star with a stellar classification of M1 IIIa. The measured angular diameter of this star is 2.58±0.20 mas. At the estimated distance of this star, this yields a physical size of about 56 times the radius of the Sun. It is radiating roughly a thousand times the luminosity of the Sun from its outer atmosphere at an effective temperature of 3,900 K.

Unexpected for a red giant, Pi Geminorum was found to be an X-ray source during the ROSAT all-sky survey. The most likely source for this emission is a magnitude 11.4 star located at an angular separation of 21 arcseconds along a position angle of 214°. This is a background star, not gravitationally bound to Pi Geminorum.

In a 1930 study, Pi Geminorum was suspected to vary in brightness by a few hundredths of a magnitude, but this has not been confirmed by modern measurements.
