= HAT-P-32b =

Extrasolar planet in the constellation Andromeda

Discovery
- Discovered by: Hartman et al.
- Discovery site: HATNet (FLWO)/Keck
- Discovery date: Published 3 November 2011
- Detection method: Transit method

Orbital characteristics
- Epoch J2000
- Semi-major axis: 0.03397+0.00051 −0.00050 AU
- Eccentricity: 0.159+0.051 −0.028
- Orbital period (sidereal): 2.15000820±0.00000013 d
- Inclination: 88.98°+0.68° −0.85°
- Argument of periastron: 50°+27° −18°
- Star: HAT-P-32 (GSC 3281-00800)

Physical characteristics
- Mean radius: 1.776±0.182 R_{J}
- Mass: 0.68+0.11 −0.10 M_{J}
- Surface gravity: 2.75±0.07 m/s^{2}
- Albedo: 0.16±0.07
- Temperature: 1962±83 K

HAT-P-32b is a planet orbiting the G-type or F-type star HAT-P-32, which is approximately 950 light years away from Earth. HAT-P-32b was first recognized as a possible planet by the planet-searching HATNet Project in 2004, although difficulties in measuring its radial velocity prevented astronomers from verifying the planet until after three years of observation. The Blendanal program helped to rule out most of the alternatives that could explain what HAT-P-32b was, leading astronomers to determine that HAT-P-32b was most likely a planet. The discovery of HAT-P-32b and of HAT-P-33b was submitted to a journal on 6 June 2011.

The planet is considered a hot Jupiter, and although it is slightly less massive than Jupiter, it is bloated to nearly twice Jupiter's size. At the time of its discovery, HAT-P-32b had one of the largest radii known amongst extrasolar planets. This phenomenon, which has also been observed in planets like WASP-17b and HAT-P-33b, has shown that something more than temperature is influencing why these planets become so large.

== Discovery ==
It had been suggested that a planet was orbiting HAT-P-32 as early as 2004; these observations were collected by the six-telescope HATNet Project, an organization in search of transiting planets, or planets that cross in front of their host stars as seen from Earth. However, attempts to confirm the planetary candidate were extremely difficult because of a high level of jitter (a random, shaky deviation in the measurements of HAT-P-32's radial velocity) present in the star's observations. High-level jitter prevented the most common technique, that of bisector analysis, from revealing the star's radial velocity with enough certainty to confirm the planet's existence.

The spectrum of HAT-P-32 was collected using the digital speedometer on Arizona's Fred Lawrence Whipple Observatory (FLWO). Analysis of the data found that HAT-P-32 was a single, moderately rotating dwarf star. Some of its parameters were also derived, including its effective temperature and surface gravity.

Between August 2007 and December 2010, twenty-eight spectra were collected using the High Resolution Echelle Spectrometer (HIRES) at the W.M. Keck Observatory in Hawaii. Twenty-five of these spectra were used to deduce HAT-P-32's radial velocity. To compensate for jitter, a greater number of spectra than usual for planetary candidates was collected. From this, it was concluded that stellar activity (and not the presence of yet-undiscovered planets) was the cause of the jitter.

Because astronomers concluded that the use of radial velocity could not, alone, establish the existence of planet HAT-P-32b, the KeplerCam CCD instrument on FLWO's 1.2m telescope was used to take photometric observations of HAT-P-32. The data collected using the KeplerCam CCD helped astronomers construct HAT-P-32's light curve. The light curve displayed a slight dimming at a point where HAT-P-32b was believed to transit its star.

The astronomers utilized Blendanal, a program used to eliminate the possibilities of false positives. This process serves a similar purpose to the Blender technique, which was used to verify some planets discovered by the Kepler spacecraft. In doing so, HAT-P-32's planet-like signature was found to not be caused by either a hierarchical triple star system or by a mixture of light between a bright single star and that of a binary star in the background. Although the possibility that HAT-P-32 is actually a binary star with a dim secondary companion nearly indistinguishable from the primary companion could not be ruled out, HAT-P-32b was confirmed as a planet based on the Blendanal analysis.

Because of the high jitter of the star, the best way to collect more data on HAT-P-32b would be to observe an occultation of HAT-P-32b behind its star using the Spitzer Space Telescope.

HAT-P-32b's discovery was reported with that of HAT-P-33b in the Astrophysical Journal.

== Host star ==
HAT-P-32, or GSC 3281–00800, is a double star; the primary is a G-type or F-type dwarf star, and the secondary is a M-type dwarf star. The system is located 292 parsecs (950 ly) away from Earth. With 1.263+0.071
−0.049 solar masses and 1.23±0.12 solar radii, HAT-P-32A is both larger and more massive than the Sun. HAT-P-32A's effective temperature is 6,407±273 K, making it slightly hotter than the Sun, although it is younger, at an estimated age of 2.7±0.8 billion years. HAT-P-32A is metal-poor; its measured metallicity is [Fe/H] = -0.16, which means that it has 69% the iron content of the Sun. The star's surface gravity is determined to be 10^{4.31±0.16} cgs, while its luminosity suggests that it emits 2.27±0.25 times the amount of energy that the Sun emits.

HAT-P-32 has an apparent magnitude of 11.197, which makes it invisible to the naked eye. A search for a binary companion star using adaptive optics at the MMT Observatory discovered a companion at a distance of 2.9 arcseconds that is 3.4 magnitudes dimmer than the primary star.

A very high level of jitter has been detected in the star's spectrum. There is a possibility that the jitter could be induced by the dimmer secondary companion. HAT-P-32's dimmer constituent probably has a mass that is under half of the Sun's mass, while it has a temperature of 3565±82 K.

Other planets with orbital periods that are smaller than that of HAT-P-32b's orbit may be present in this system. However, when the discovery of the planet was published, not enough radial velocity measurements had been collected to determine if this was the case.

== Characteristics ==
HAT-P-32b is a Hot Jupiter that has 0.68 Jupiter masses and 1.776 Jupiter radii. In other words, HAT-P-32b is slightly less massive than Jupiter is, although it is much larger. The planet's semi-major axis from its host star is 0.0340 AU, or 3.4% of the mean distance between the Earth and the Sun. It completes an orbit every 2.15000820 days (51.600197 hours). HAT-P-32b has a measured effective temperature of 1,962 K (1,689 °C; 3,072 °F), which is 16 times hotter than Jupiter's equilibrium temperature.

Because HAT-P-32b's orbital inclination with respect to Earth is 89°, the planet is seen to transit its host star as its orbit is seen nearly edge-on.

A study in 2012, utilizing the Rossiter–McLaughlin effect, has determined the planet is orbiting at nearly polar orbit relative to the rotation of the star, misalignment equal to 85±1.5°.

HAT-P-32b had one of the highest radii known amongst planets at the time of its discovery. Like planets HAT-P-33b and WASP-17b, which are similarly inflated, the mechanism behind this is unknown; it is not solely related to temperature, which is known to have an effect. This is especially clear when compared to WASP-18b, a planet that is hotter than the aforementioned HAT and WASP planets, but despite its temperature its radius is far lower than that of its counterparts.

The planetary spectrum shows evidence of Roche lobe overflow and rapid mass loss 13±7 million tons per second.

It was also found that the planet's radius, observed with planetary transits, varies with wavelength. Different radii for each wavelength could arise from an atmosphere where a Rayleigh scattering haze is combined with a grey cloud deck. The thick (clouds up to pressure level of 0.4-33 kPa) cloud deck and haze above it was indeed confirmed in 2020, along with the detection of water in the atmosphere of HAT-P-32b.
