= DM Geminorum =

Nova that appeared in 1903

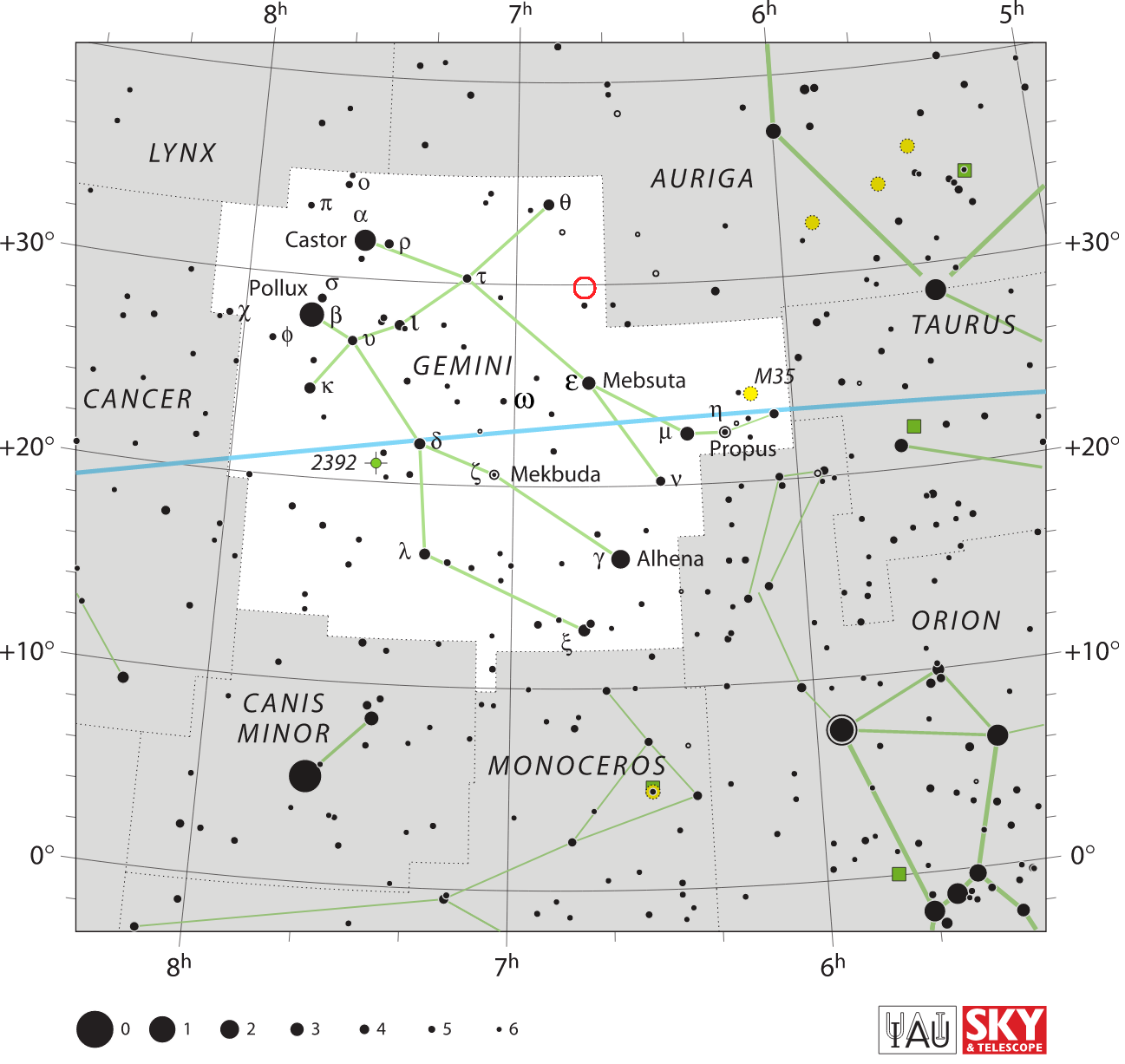
- Location of DM Geminorum (circled in red)

Observation data Epoch J2000.0 Equinox J2000.0 (ICRS)
- Constellation: Gemini
- Right ascension: 06^{h} 44^{m} 12.05^{s}
- Declination: +29° 56′ 41.9″
- Apparent magnitude (V): 4.8v — 16.7p

Characteristics
- Variable type: Classical Nova, Intermediate polar?

Other designations
- Nova Gem 1903, DM Gem, HD 48328, AAVSO 0637+30, HR 2472

Database references
| SIMBAD | data |

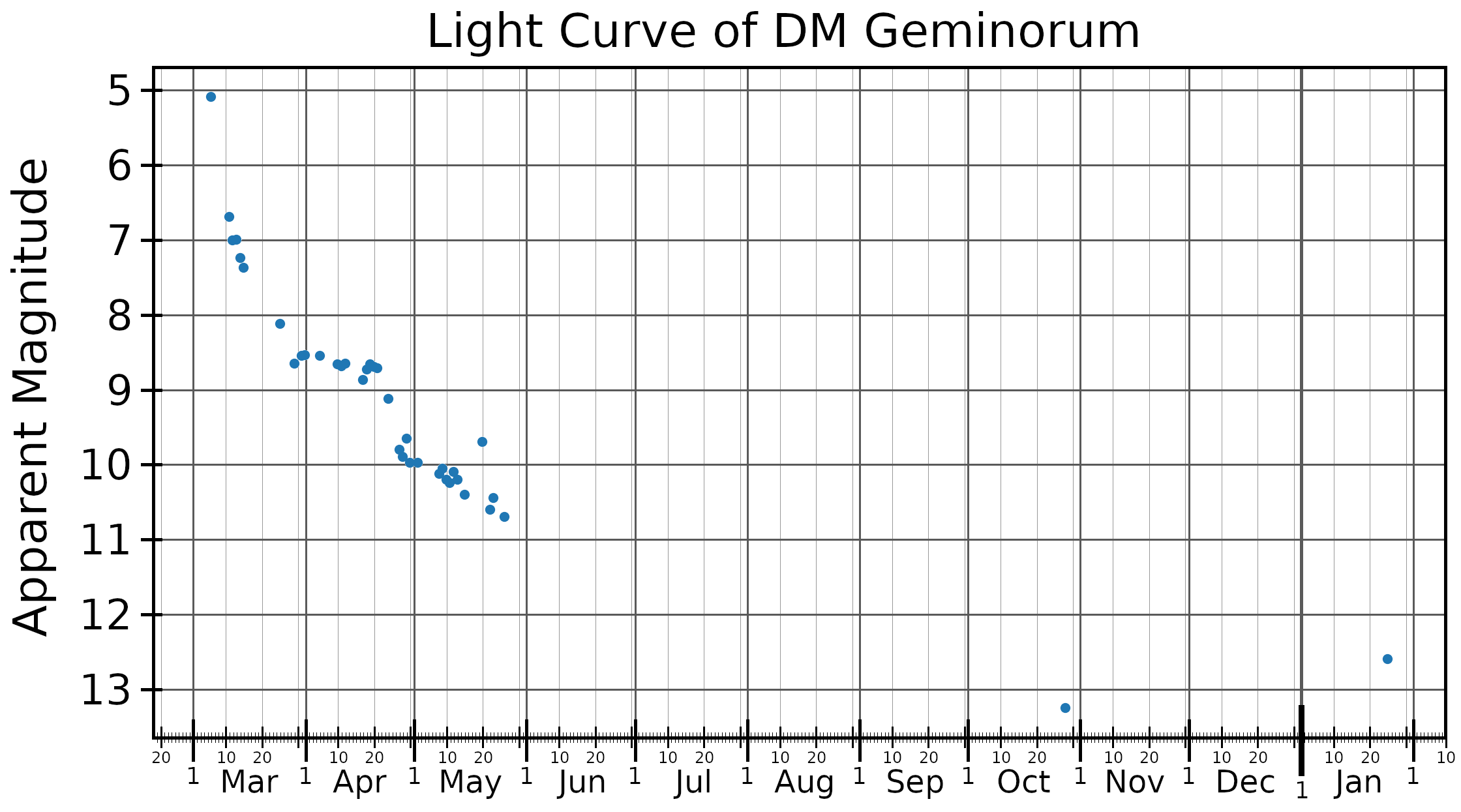
The light curve of nova DM Geminorum, plotted from data presented by Shapley. When multiple values were listed with exactly the same time, they were averaged before plotting.

DM Geminorum also known as Nova Geminorum 1903 was a nova which erupted in the constellation Gemini in 1903. It was discovered by Herbert Hall Turner at the Greenwich Observatory on a Carte du Ciel photographic plate taken on 16 March 1903. Post-discovery examination of earlier photographs of the region taken at the Harvard College Observatory showed that the star was fainter than apparent magnitude 9 on 2 March 1903, and magnitude 5.1 on 6 March 1903, making it visible to the naked eye at that time. It had a conspicuous red color due to strong Hα line emission. By 1 April 1903 it had faded to magnitude 8.5. By 1989 it had reached visual magnitude 17.38.

DM Geminorum faded from peak brightness by 2 magnitudes in just 6 days, making it a "very fast nova".

All novae are binary stars, with a "donor" star orbiting a white dwarf. The two stars are so close together that matter is transferred from the donor to the white dwarf. High speed photometry done with the 1.2 meter telescope at the Whipple Observatory show a small amplitude (0.25 magnitude peak-to-peak) oscillation with a period of 2 hours and 57 minutes, which is probably the orbital period of the binary system. In addition, brightness variations with a period of 22 minutes are also seen in this star's light curve. The star's spectrum and brightness variations are similar to what is seen in intermediate polars.
