= HAT-P-24 =

F8 dwarf star in the constellation Gemini

Observation data Epoch J2000 Equinox J2000
- Constellation: Gemini
- Right ascension: 07^{h} 15^{m} 18.0194^{s}
- Declination: +14° 15′ 45.408″
- Apparent magnitude (V): 11.754

Characteristics
- Evolutionary stage: main sequence
- Spectral type: F8

Astrometry
Proper motion (μ)	RA: 8.193(15) mas/yr Dec.: −1.595(12) mas/yr
Parallax (π)	2.4202±0.0148 mas
Distance	1,348 ± 8 ly (413 ± 3 pc)

Details
Mass	1.195 ± 0.012 M_{☉}
Radius	1.321 ± 0.063 R_{☉}
Luminosity	2.48 ^{+0.032}_{−0.028} L_{☉}
Surface gravity (log g)	4.27 ± 0.04 cgs
Temperature	6329 ± 67 K
Metallicity [Fe/H]	–0.21 ± 0.08 dex
Rotational velocity (v sin i)	11.4 ± 1.2 km/s
Age	2.8 ± 0.6 Gyr

Other designations
- TYC 774-1441-1, GSC 0774-01441, 2MASS J07151801+1415453, Gaia DR3 3167323052618369408

Database references
SIMBAD	data

HAT-P-24 is an F8 dwarf star about 413 parsecs away. A planet was discovered with the transit method by the HATNet Project in 2010. HAT-P-24b, is a typical hot Jupiter orbiting in only 3 days.

== Planetary system ==
In 2010 the HATNet Project announced the discovery of a hot jupiter type gas giant extrasolar planet in orbit around this star. Following the designation scheme used by the HATNet Project, the star is designated as HAT-P-24, and the planet itself HAT-P-24b.

The HAT-P-24 planetary system
Companion (in order from star)	Mass	Semimajor axis (AU)	Orbital period (days)	Eccentricity	Inclination (°)	Radius
b	0.723+0.031 −0.030 M_{J}	0.04651+0.00055 −0.00056	3.3552479±0.0000062	<0.038	88.217 ^{+0.716}_{−0.693}	1.364 ± 0.068 R_{J}
