= HAT-P-33 =

F-type star in the constellation Gemini

Observation data Epoch J2000.0 Equinox J2000.0
- Constellation: Gemini
- Right ascension: 07^{h} 32^{m} 44.2174^{s}
- Declination: +33° 50′ 06.115″
- Apparent magnitude (V): 11.120±0.050

Characteristics
- Evolutionary stage: main sequence
- Spectral type: F4
- Apparent magnitude (B): 11.583±0.066

Astrometry
Proper motion (μ)	RA: −0.125(24) mas/yr Dec.: −2.444(23) mas/yr
Parallax (π)	2.5186±0.0195 mas
Distance	1,290 ± 10 ly (397 ± 3 pc)

Details
Mass	1.375±0.040 M_{☉}
Radius	1.637±0.034 R_{☉}
Luminosity	4.15±0.33 L_{☉}
Surface gravity (log g)	4.15±0.01 cgs
Temperature	6446±88 K
Metallicity [Fe/H]	0.07±0.08 dex
Rotational velocity (v sin i)	13.7±0.5 km/s
Age	2.3±0.3 Gyr

Other designations
- TYC 2461-988-1, GSC 2461-00988, 2MASS J07324421+3350061

Database references
SIMBAD	data

HAT-P-33 (2MASS J07324421+335006, GSC 2461-00988) is a late-F dwarf star. It is orbited by a planet called HAT-P-33b. A search for a binary companion star using adaptive optics at the MMT Observatory was negative.

== Planetary system ==
The transiting hot Jupiter exoplanet orbiting HAT-P-33 was discovered by the HATNet Project in 2011. An effort to detect transit timing variations due to other planets found none.

The HAT-P-33 planetary system
Companion (in order from star)	Mass	Semimajor axis (AU)	Orbital period (days)	Eccentricity	Inclination (°)	Radius
b	0.72+0.13 −0.12 M_{J}	0.0505±0.0018	3.47447472±0.00000088	0.180+0.11 −0.096	88.2+1.2 −1.3	1.87+0.26 −0.20 R_{J}
