= WY Geminorum =

Binary star in the constellation Gemini

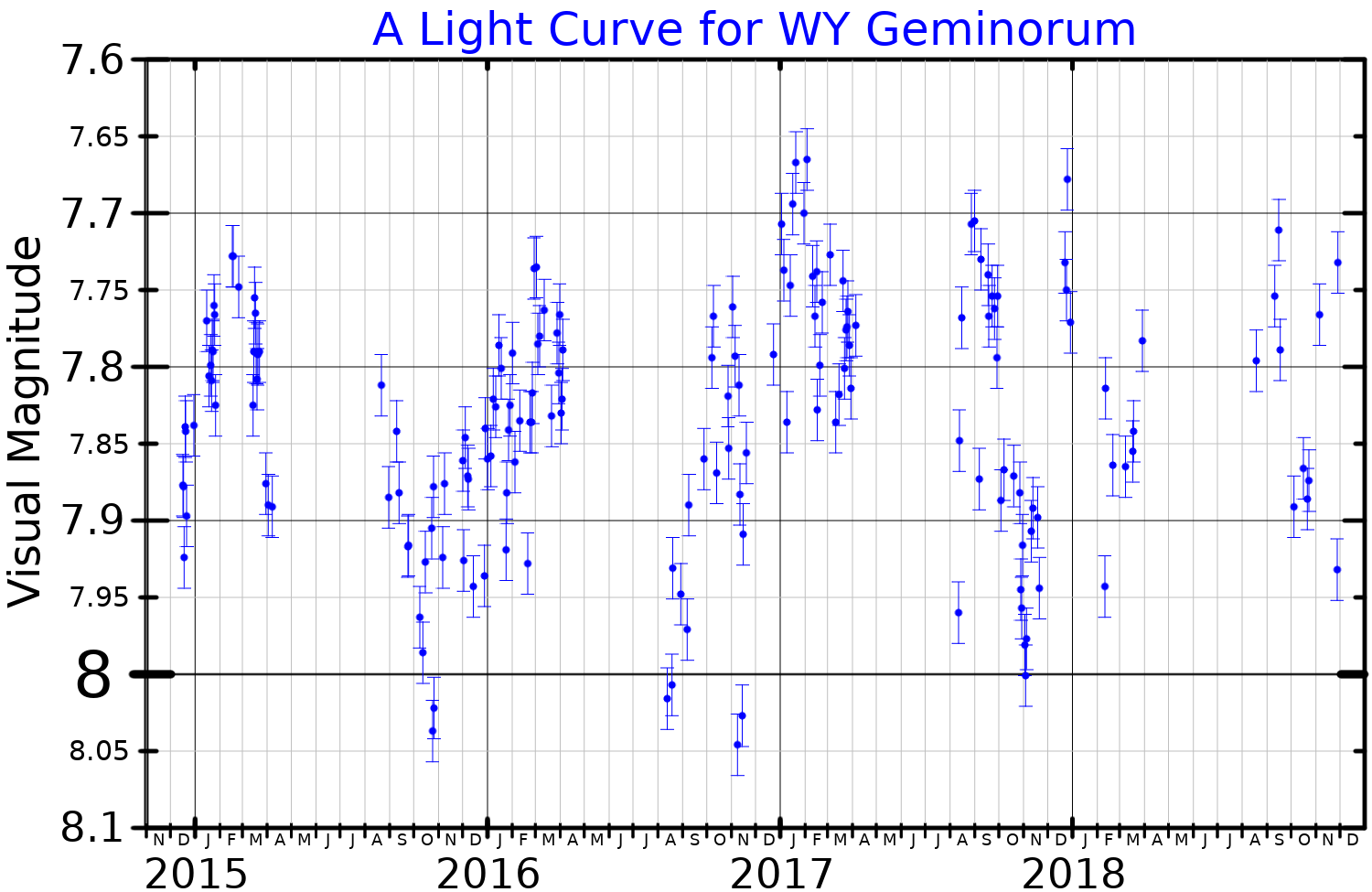
- A visual band light curve for WY Geminorum, plotted from ASAS-SN data

Observation data Epoch J2000.0 Equinox ICRS
- Constellation: Gemini
- Right ascension: 06^{h} 11^{m} 56.250^{s}
- Declination: +23° 12′ 25.41″
- Apparent magnitude (V): 7.263 to 7.513

Characteristics
- Spectral type: M2Ia-b + B2V
- B−V color index: 1.517±0.017
- Variable type: Irregular variable + eclipsing binary

Astrometry
Radial velocity (R_{v})	19.52±0.22 km/s
Proper motion (μ)	RA: 0.450 mas/yr Dec.: −2.380 mas/yr
Parallax (π)	0.5169±0.0343 mas
Distance	6,300 ± 400 ly (1,900 ± 100 pc)

Orbit
Period (P)	64.48 ± 0.68 yr
Semi-major axis (a)	≥ (4.09±0.19)×10^{9} km
Eccentricity (e)	0.61±0.03
Periastron epoch (T)	2,445,620±130 JD
Argument of periastron (ω) (secondary)	57.5±4.5°
Semi-amplitude (K_{1}) (primary)	16.0±0.9 km/s

Details

Primary
Radius	522+45 −34 R_{☉}
Surface gravity (log g)	0.70 cgs
Temperature	3,789 K
Metallicity [Fe/H]	−0.36 dex

Other designations
- WY Gem, BD+23°1243, HD 42474, HIP 29425, SAO 78094, PPM 95591

Database references
SIMBAD	data

WY Geminorum is a binary star system in the northern constellation of Gemini, abbreviated WY Gem. It has an apparent visual magnitude that ranges from 7.26 down to 7.51, which is too faint to be readily viewed with the naked eye. This system is located at a distance of approximately 6,300 light years from the Sun based on parallax measurements, and is receding with a radial velocity of 19.5 km/s.

In 1922, M. L. Humason found the spectrum of HD 42474 matches an M-type star, but with the peculiarity of numerous bright lines. It appears similar to the spectrum of VV Cephei (HR 8383), an eclipsing binary. P. Swings and O. Struve in 1941 discovered emission lines in the ultraviolet spectrum. The presence of a B-type stellar spectrum from a companion star was confirmed by W. P. Bidelman in 1954. The primary spectrum matches an M-type supergiant star. A. Cowley in 1970 found evidence of an atmospheric eclipse of the companion. In 1981, A. Buzzoni determined the primary to be a semi-regular variable of the SRb type with a period of 169 days.

This is a double-lined spectroscopic binary star system with an approximate orbital period of 64.48 ± 0.68 years and a high eccentricity (ovalness) of 0.61. The primary component is an M-type supergiant star with a stellar classification of M2Ia or b. The companion is most likely a hotter B-type main-sequence star with a class of B2V. The pair are classified as a VV Cephei-type star system. The companion may be accreting matter from the supergiant around the time of periastron passage, resulting in the formation of an intermittent accretion disk orbiting the hotter star. Radio emission has been detected, which is most likely coming from an ionized region in the stellar wind of the supergiant.
