= HD 44780 =

Binary star system in the constellation Gemini

Observation data Epoch J2000.0 Equinox ICRS
- Constellation: Gemini
- Right ascension: 06^{h} 24^{m} 43.74735^{s}
- Declination: +25° 02′ 55.3981″
- Apparent magnitude (V): 6.35

Characteristics
- Spectral type: K2 III (K2–K3 III + K0–K1 III)
- B−V color index: +1.210±0.015

Astrometry
Radial velocity (R_{v})	+17.2±0.3 km/s
Proper motion (μ)	RA: +2.459 mas/yr Dec.: −1.895 mas/yr
Parallax (π)	3.4049±0.1139 mas
Distance	960 ± 30 ly (294 ± 10 pc)
Absolute magnitude (M_{V})	−0.53

Orbit
Period (P)	577.5±0.5 d
Semi-major axis (a)	4.16±1.28 mas
Eccentricity (e)	0.240±0.006
Inclination (i)	109±12°
Periastron epoch (T)	43,625.5±2.8 MJD
Argument of periastron (ω) (secondary)	85.8±1.9°
Semi-amplitude (K_{1}) (primary)	22.06±0.15 km/s
Semi-amplitude (K_{2}) (secondary)	22.66±0.32 km/s

Details

A
Mass	3.10±0.65 M_{☉}
Age	400 Myr

B
Mass	3.02±0.64 M_{☉}

Other designations
- BD+25°1255, FK5 2488, GC 8261, HD 44780, HIP 30501, SAO 78331

Database references
SIMBAD	data

HD 44780 is a binary star system in the northern constellation of Gemini, located about 3° north of Mu Geminorum. The pair have a combined apparent visual magnitude of 6.35, which is near the lower limit of visibility to the naked eye. Although it is above magnitude 6.5, it was not included in the Bright Star Catalogue; the designation HD 44780 comes from the Henry Draper catalogue. Based upon parallax measurements, the system is located at a distance of approximately 960 light years from the Sun. It is drifting further away with a radial velocity of +17 km/s.

The variable velocity of this system was first noted during a study at Mount Wilson Observatory in 1952. It is a double-lined spectroscopic binary system with an orbital period of 1.581 years and an eccentricity of 0.24. Both components are similar, aging giant stars, a relatively rare combination. Their combined spectrum matches a stellar classification of K2 III, with the secondary being a slightly earlier type than the primary but smaller and less luminous. They have an age of about 400 million years, with masses 3.10 and 3.02 times that of the Sun.
