= HAT-P-33b =

Extrasolar planet

Discovery
- Discovered by: Hartman et al.
- Discovery site: HATNet (FLWO)/Keck
- Discovery date: Published June 6, 2011
- Detection method: transit method

Orbital characteristics
- Semi-major axis: 0.0505±0.0018 AU
- Eccentricity: 0.180+0.11 −0.096
- Orbital period (sidereal): 3.47447472±0.00000088 d
- Inclination: 88.2+1.2 −1.3
- Time of periastron: 2,457,046.20+0.22 −0.23
- Argument of periastron: 88+33 −34
- Semi-amplitude: 78±12
- Star: HAT-P-33 (GSC 02461-00988)

Physical characteristics
- Mean radius: 1.87+0.26 −0.20 R_{J}
- Mass: 0.72+0.13 −0.12 M_{J}
- Mean density: 0.134+0.053 −0.042 g cm^{−3}
- Surface gravity: 2.70+0.10 −0.11 m/s^{2}
- Temperature: 1,920+140 −120

HAT-P-33b is a planet in the orbit of HAT-P-33, which lies 1,310 light-years away from Earth. Its discovery was reported in June 2011, although it was suspected to be a planet as early as 2004. The planet is about three-fourths the mass of Jupiter, but is almost eighty percent larger than Jupiter is; this inflation has, as with the discovery of similar planets WASP-17b and HAT-P-32b, raised the question of what (other than temperature) causes these planets to become so large.

HAT-P-33b was difficult to confirm because its star experiences high jitter, which disrupted the ability to obtain accurate measurements. As such, a greater number of radial velocity observations were collected to make the confirmation, although it was later determined that HAT-P-33b could not be determined using the radial velocity method. The planet's confirmation came about after the planet's light curve was collected, and the Blendanal process ruled out most false positive scenarios.

== Discovery ==
HAT-P-33b's existence was first suggested after observations by the six-telescope HATnet collaboration, a project that searches the sky for planets in transit of, or crossing in front of, their host stars. The presence of a planet in HAT-P-33's orbit had been suspected as early as 2004, although high levels of jitter were detected. This jitter, or a random and shaky appearance that clouds the accuracy of measurements, made it difficult to easily verify the radial velocity of the planetary candidate's host star, which usually leads summarily to the planet's confirmation.

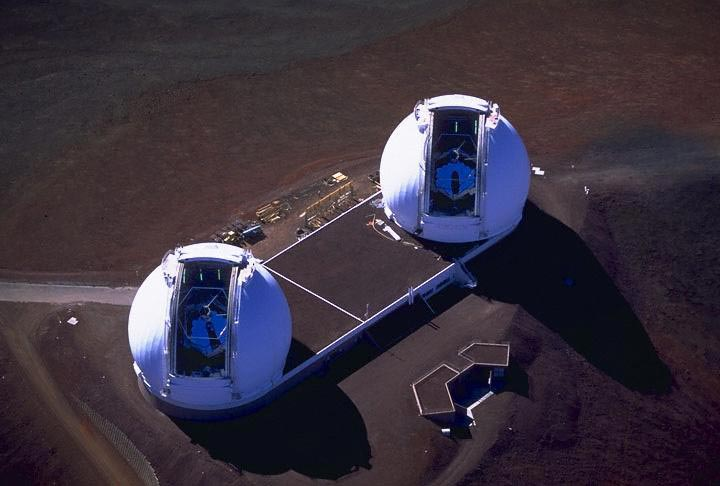
The W. M. Keck Observatory was used to collect data on HAT-P-33's radial velocity.

As a start, the spectrum of HAT-P-33 was composed using the digital speedometer at the 1.5-meter Fred Lawrence Whipple Observatory in Arizona. The collected data found that the star was a single dwarf star exhibiting a slight rotation. Several of its parameters, including its effective temperature and surface gravity, were found. Additionally, the SOPHIE échelle spectrograph at a 1.93-meter telescope at France's Haute-Provence Observatory was used to observe the star. The resulting data invited the possibility that radial velocity measurements, which can exhibit anomalies that often indicate the presence of a planet, may have been because of background distortion (and not a planet). This possibility significantly complicated the ability of scientists to verify this planet. After the observations, follow-ups were postponed for several years.

Between September 2008 and December 2010, twenty-two spectra were collected using the High Resolution Echelle Spectrometer (HIRES) instrument at Hawaii's W. M. Keck Observatory. This data was used to derive HAT-P-33's radial velocity. A far greater number of spectra were gathered for HAT-P-33 than the number usually gathered for planetary candidates to compensate for the data's jitter effect. It was concluded that the jitter in the data was caused by stellar activity and not the presence of other planets.

It became apparent to the investigating science team that radial velocity data alone could not prove the existence of HAT-P-33b. As such, photometric observations of HAT-P-33 were conducted using the Fred Lawrence Whipple Observatory's 1.2-meter telescope, which hosted the KeplerCam CCD instrument. This data was used to create the light curve of HAT-P-33. In doing so, a slight dimming was observed where HAT-P-33b was believed to have transited its star.

Using a program called Blendanal, similar to the Blender technique used to verify the planets discovered by Kepler, the astronomers observing HAT-P-33 hoped to rule out false positive alternatives that could explain the planet-like signal seen in HAT-P-33's light curve and radial velocity. The use of Blendanal ruled out the possibilities that the signal was caused by that of a hierarchical triple star or a mixture between a bright star and a binary star in the background. The possibility that HAT-P-33 is actually a binary star whose secondary companion is too dim to be distinguishable from the brighter star could not be ruled out. However, the data indicated that the planet HAT-P-33b did indeed exist.

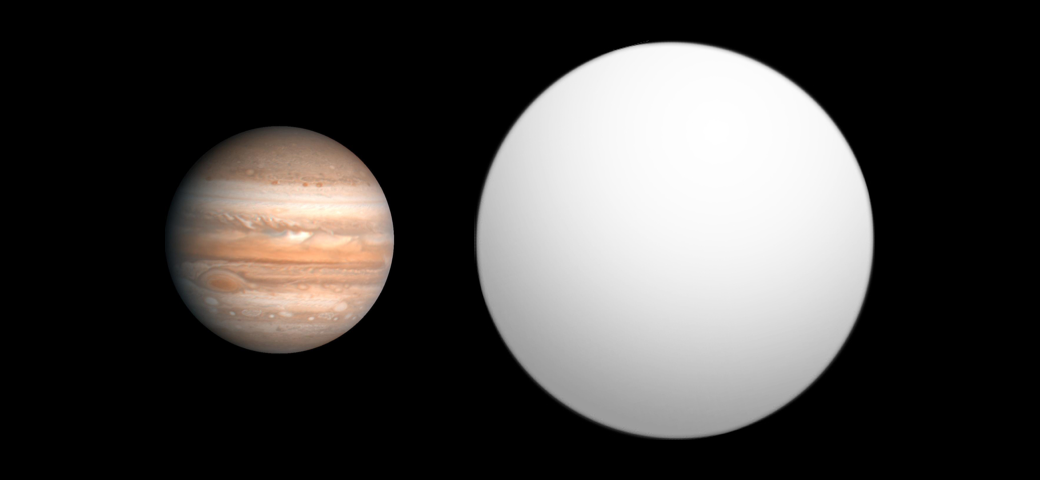
HAT-P-33b is 1.8 times the size of Jupiter (left), and slightly larger than WASP-17b (right).

The discoveries of the high-radii planets HAT-P-33b and HAT-P-32b, along with that of WASP-17b, contributed to the question of what factors, besides temperature, contribute to the large radii of these inflated planets. The discrepancy lies in planet WASP-18b, which is far hotter than the newly discovered HAT planets and WASP-17b, but has a far smaller radius.

The discoveries of HAT-P-33b and HAT-P-32b were reported together in the Astrophysical Journal. The paper was submitted on June 6, 2011. The authors of the discovery paper of the planets suggested the usage of the Spitzer Space Telescope to observe the occultation of HAT-P-33b behind its star to better define its characteristics.

== Host star ==
HAT-P-33, or GSC 2461-00988, is an F-type star that lies approximately 401 parsecs (1,310 light-years) away from Earth. The star has 1.403 solar masses and 1.777 solar radii; the star is, in other words, 40% more massive than and 77% larger than the Sun. With an effective temperature of 6,401 K, HAT-P-33 is hotter than the Sun. It is also more metal-rich, with a metallicity that is measured at [Fe/H] = 0.05. This means that HAT-P-33 has 12% more iron than the amount measured in the Sun. HAT-P-33 is younger than the Sun, at an estimated age of 2.4 billion years. The surface gravity of the star is determined to be 4.09. All the values above are determined with the assumption that planet HAT-P-33b has an irregular, or eccentric, orbit.

HAT-P-33 has an apparent magnitude of 11.89. It cannot be seen from Earth with the naked eye because it is so dim.

Because high levels of jitter have been detected in the spectrum of HAT-P-33, the ability to collect the most sensitive radial velocity measurements possible has been dulled. The loss of accuracy has prevented astronomers from disregarding the possibility that HAT-P-33 is actually a binary star, where the secondary, dimmer companion is visually indistinguishable from the brighter primary companion. If this is the case, then the dimmer star in the HAT-P-33 system would have to have a mass that is less than 0.55 times that of the Sun. A search for a binary companion star using adaptive optics at the MMT Observatory was negative.

It is possible that other planets with shorter orbital periods than HAT-P-33b exist in the system. However, at the time of HAT-P-33b's discovery, not enough radial velocity measurements had been collected to determine if this is so.

== Characteristics ==
HAT-P-33b is a planet that has 0.764 Jupiter masses and 1.827 Jupiter radii. In other words, it is about three-fourths as massive as Jupiter, but is slightly less than twice Jupiter's size. HAT-P-33b orbits its star at an average distance of 0.0503 AU, which is about 5% of the average distance between the Sun and Earth. This orbit is completed every 3.474474 days (83.39 hours). HAT-P-33b has an equilibrium temperature of 1,838 K, which is almost fifteen times hotter than the measured equilibrium temperature of Jupiter (124 K).

The best fit for the shape of HAT-P-33b's orbit suggests that the orbit is slightly elliptical, as the planet's orbital eccentricity is fit to 0.148. However, because the star HAT-P-33 has such a high level of jitter, it is difficult to constrain the planet's eccentricity with accuracy. Most of the planet's defined characteristics are based on the assumption that HAT-P-33b has an elliptical orbit, although the planet's discoverers have also derived HAT-P-33b's characteristics on the assumption that the planet has a circular orbit. The elliptical model has been chosen because it is considered to be the most likely scenario.

HAT-P-33b has an orbital inclination of 86.7º as seen from Earth. The planet is, thus, almost edge-on when seen from Earth. The planet has been observed to transit its host star.
