= HAT-P-24b =

Extrasolar planet in the constellation Gemini

Discovery
- Discovered by: HATNet Project
- Discovery date: 2010
- Detection method: Transit

Orbital characteristics
- Semi-major axis: 0.04651+0.00055 −0.00056 AU
- Eccentricity: <0.038
- Orbital period (sidereal): 3.3552479±0.0000062 d
- Star: HAT-P-24

Physical characteristics
- Mean radius: 1.243 ^{+0.072}_{−0.061} R_{J}
- Mass: 0.723+0.031 −0.030 M_{J}
- Mean density: 0.467+0.089 −0.070 g cm^{−3}
- Surface gravity: 10.9 ± 1.1 m/s^{2} (35.8 ± 3.6 ft/s^{2})

HAT-P-24b is an extrasolar planet discovered by the HATNet Project in 2010 orbiting the F8 dwarf star HAT-P-24. It is a hot Jupiter, with a mass three quarters that of Jupiter and a radius 20% larger.

The study in 2012, utilizing a Rossiter–McLaughlin effect, have determined the planetary orbit is probably aligned with the equatorial plane of the star, misalignment equal to 20±16°.
