= V429 Geminorum =

Star in the constellation Gemini

BD+20° 1790
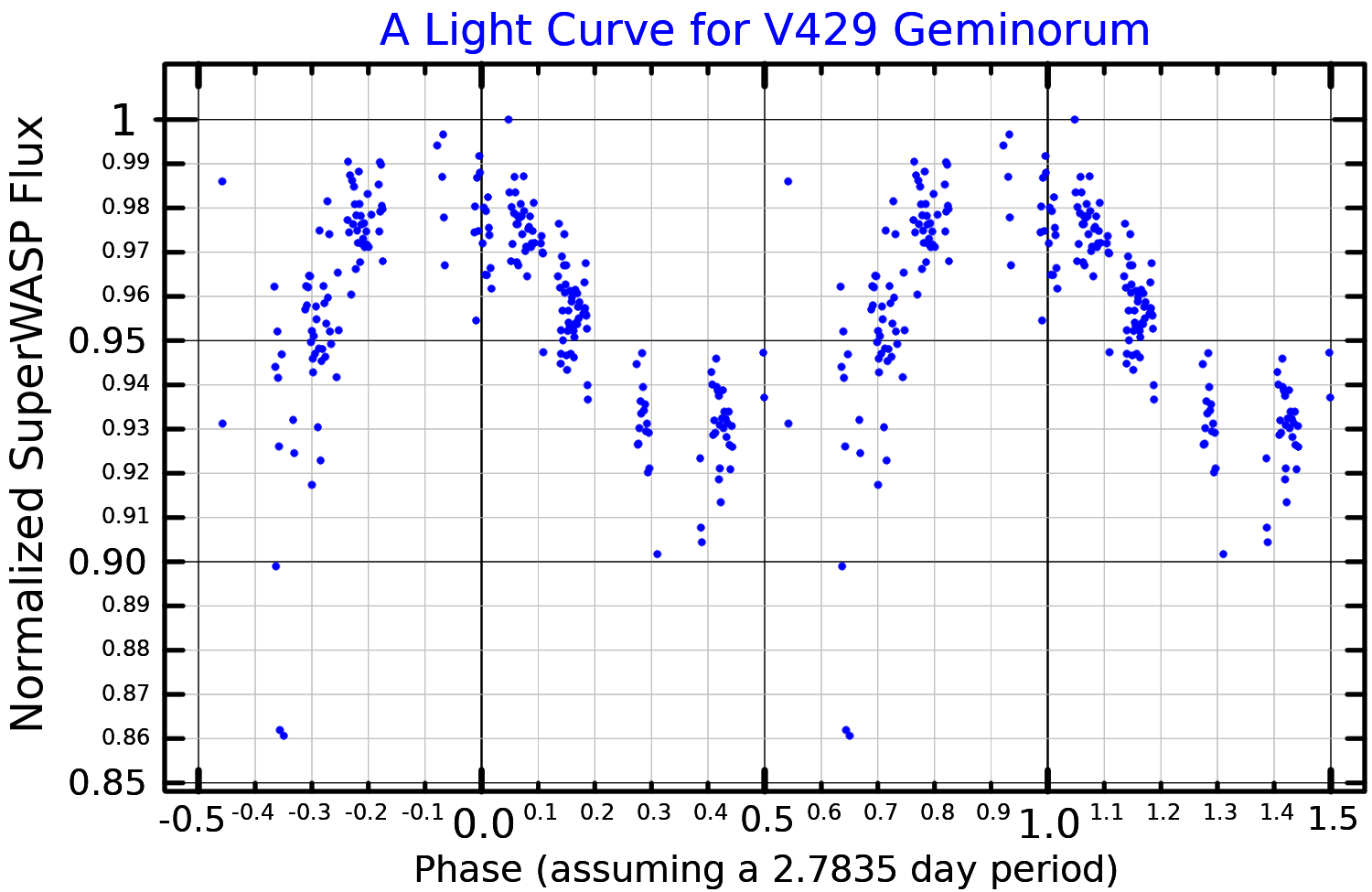
- A light curve for V429 Geminorum, adapted from Norton et al. (2007)

Observation data Epoch J2000.0 Equinox ICRS
- Constellation: Gemini
- Right ascension: 07^{h} 23^{m} 43.58935^{s}
- Declination: +20° 24′ 58.6506″
- Apparent magnitude (V): 9.86 - 10.080

Characteristics
- Evolutionary stage: main sequence
- Spectral type: K5Ve
- Variable type: BY Dra

Astrometry
Radial velocity (R_{v})	7.56±0.28 km/s
Proper motion (μ)	RA: −65.642 mas/yr Dec.: −230.692 mas/yr
Parallax (π)	36.0856±0.0186 mas
Distance	90.38 ± 0.05 ly (27.71 ± 0.01 pc)

Details
Mass	0.63 M_{☉}
Radius	0.71 R_{☉}
Luminosity	0.17 L_{☉}
Surface gravity (log g)	4.53 cgs
Temperature	4410 K
Metallicity	0.30
Rotation	2.76±0.04 d
Rotational velocity (v sin i)	10.03 km/s
Age	35-80 Myr

Other designations
- V429 Gem, BD+20°1790, TYC 1355-214-1, USNO-B1.0 1104-00142035, 2MASS J07234358+2024588, 1SWASP J072343.59+202458.6

Database references
SIMBAD	data

V429 Geminorum (BD+20°1790) is a young orange dwarf star in the constellation Gemini, located 90 light years away from the Sun. It is a BY Draconis variable, a cool dwarf which varies rapidly in brightness as it rotates.

== Description ==
The star is young and very active and is a member of the AB Doradus Moving Group. The star has also been studied and monitored by SuperWASP group and found to coincide with the ROSAT source 1RXS J072343.6+202500. The planet candidate was announced in December 2009.

== Disproven planet ==
The Keplerian fit of the radial velocity data suggested an orbital solution for a close-in massive planet with an orbital period of 7.7834 days. Moreover, the presence of a close-in massive jovian planet could explain the high level of stellar activity detected. However, further study suggests that this planet does not exist because the radial velocity variations are strongly correlated to stellar activity, suggesting this activity is the cause of the variations. This echoes the similar case of the disproven planet detection around TW Hydrae, which was also found to be due to stellar activity rather than orbital motion.

== See also ==
- List of extrasolar planets
