= Nu Octantis =

Brightest star in the constellation Octans

ν Octantis
- Location of ν Octantis in Octans (circled)

Observation data Epoch J2000 Equinox ICRS
- Constellation: Octans
- Right ascension: 21^{h} 41^{m} 28.64977^{s}
- Declination: −77° 23′ 24.1563″
- Apparent magnitude (V): 3.73

Characteristics

A
- Evolutionary stage: Subgiant
- Spectral type: K1IV
- U−B color index: +0.89
- B−V color index: +1.00

B
- Evolutionary stage: white dwarf

Astrometry
Radial velocity (R_{v})	+34.40 km/s
Proper motion (μ)	RA: +66.41 mas/yr Dec.: −239.10 mas/yr
Parallax (π)	45.25±0.25 mas
Distance	73.5±0.68 ly (22.54±0.21 pc)
Absolute magnitude (M_{V})	2.3±0.16

Orbit
Period (P)	1050.74+0.20 −0.10 days
Semi-major axis (a)	2.61±0.03 AU
Eccentricity (e)	0.2366±0.0003
Inclination (i)	71.8+0.7 −0.6°
Longitude of the node (Ω)	86.5±0.3°
Argument of periastron (ω) (secondary)	74.88+0.06 −0.14°
Semi-amplitude (K_{2}) (secondary)	7.0648+0.0050 −0.0009 km/s

Details

Nu Octantis A
Mass	1.57±0.06 M_{☉}
Radius	5.04±0.10 R_{☉}
Luminosity	13.2±0.3 L_{☉}
Surface gravity (log g)	3.23+0.02 −0.03 cgs
Temperature	4,811.0±4.2 K
Metallicity [Fe/H]	+0.18±0.04 dex
Rotational velocity (v sin i)	2.0 km/s
Age	2.70±0.35 Gyr

Nu Octantis B
Mass	0.57±0.01 M_{☉}

Other designations
- ν Oct, CD−77 1079, FK5 810, GC 30289, GJ 835.1, GJ 9744, HD 205478, HIP 107089, HR 8254, SAO 257948, CCDM J21415-7723, WDS J21415-7723

Database references
SIMBAD	data
Exoplanet Archive	data

ν Octantis, Latinised as Nu Octantis, is a binary star in the constellation of Octans. Unusually for having such a late greek letter in its name, it is the brightest star in this faint constellation at apparent magnitude +3.7. It is located at 22.54 parsecs (73.5 light-years) from Earth, and is moving away at a radial velocity of +34.4 km/s. The primary star has an exoplanet whose orbit lies halfway between both stars.

== Characteristics ==
This is a spectroscopic binary system, meaning the binarity was inferred from periodic Doppler shifts in the spectral lines, which correspond to the motion of the stars. Both stars take 1,050 days (2.9 years) to complete an orbit around each other, being separated by a semi-major axis of 2.61 astronomical units at a somewhat elliptical orbit.

The primary has a spectral type of K1IV, with the luminosity class IV indicating that it is a subgiant star that has fused up all the hydrogen at its core and has expanded. Nu Octantis A has 1.57 times the mass of the Sun, but has expanded to 5.04 times the radius of the Sun. Its photosphere has cooled to an effective temperature of 4,811 K and now is radiating 13.2 times as much luminosity as the Sun.

The secondary star is a white dwarf with 0.57 times the mass of the Sun. When it was on the main sequence, it had a mass of 2.36+0.13
−0.15 M_{☉} and was closer to its primary, at 1.31±0.07 AU. When it evolved to a red giant, and then to a white dwarf, it lost most of its mass, thus increasing the orbital separation. The primary star accreted about 0.2 M_{☉} from the secondary during this period.

Nu Octantis is unusual on that its Bayer designation would suggest it is one of the faintest stars in the constellation, but is actually the brightest, over one magnitude brighter than Alpha Octantis. It seems that Lacaille (who lettered the Bayer stars in Octans) believed that Nu Octantis was a double star (like Mu Octantis) of small angular separation, rather than a single bright star.

== Planetary system ==
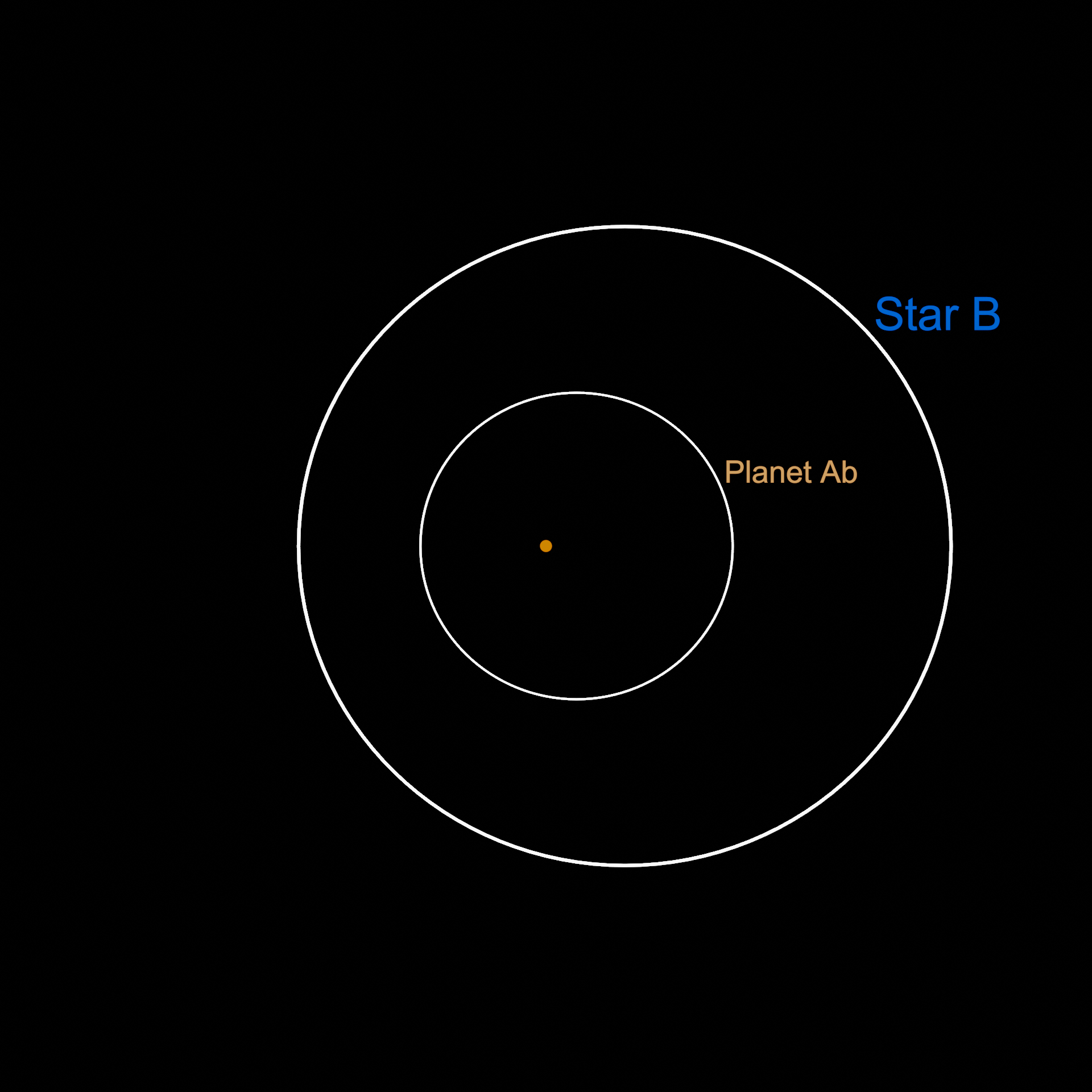
Orbital configuration of the Nu Octantis system, centered on the subgiant primary.

In 2009, the system was hypothesised to contain a superjovian exoplanet based on variations in the radial velocity. A prograde solution was quickly ruled out but a retrograde solution remains a possibility, although a study posited that it may instead be due to the secondary star being itself a close binary, since the formation of a planet in such a system would be difficult due to gravitational perturbations. Further evidence ruling out a stellar variability and favouring the existence of the planet was gathered by 2021. With new radial velocity measurements, a study in 2025 confirmed the planet's existence.

The binary components in the Nu Octantis system were initially separated by 1.3 AU, which overlap with the current orbital separation of the planet. Therefore, the planet did not form in its current orbit, but either migrated from a longer, circumbinary orbit, or originated from a protoplanetary disc that formed after the death of the white dwarf's progenitor.

The Nu Octantis A planetary system
Companion (in order from star)	Mass	Semimajor axis (AU)	Orbital period (days)	Eccentricity	Inclination (°)	Radius
b	2.19±0.11 M_{J}	1.24±0.02	402.4+7.7 −6.0	0.195+0.050 −0.037	108.2	—

== See also ==
- Gamma Cephei and Nu^{2} Canis Majoris, another similar-sized giant stars hosting a jovian planet
- Beta Hydri
