= Castor (star) =

Sextuple star system in Gemini

- Location of Castor (circled)

Observation data Epoch J2000 Equinox ICRS
- Constellation: Gemini
- Pronunciation: /ˈkæstər/
- α Geminorum A
- Right ascension: 07^{h} 34^{m} 35.863^{s}
- Declination: +31° 53′ 17.79″
- Apparent magnitude (V): 1.93
- α Geminorum B
- Right ascension: 07^{h} 34^{m} 36.100^{s}
- Declination: +31° 53′ 18.57″
- Apparent magnitude (V): 2.97
- α Geminorum C
- Right ascension: 07^{h} 34^{m} 37.584^{s}
- Declination: +31° 53′ 17.82″
- Apparent magnitude (V): 9.83

Characteristics

α Geminorum A
- Spectral type: A1V + dM1e
- B−V color index: +0.03

α Geminorum B
- Spectral type: Am + dM1e
- B−V color index: +0.04

α Geminorum C
- Spectral type: dM1e + dM1e
- U−B color index: +1.04
- B−V color index: +1.49
- Variable type: BY Dra

Astrometry

α Geminorum AB
Radial velocity (R_{v})	5.40 km/s
Proper motion (μ)	RA: −175.88 mas/yr Dec.: −99.28 mas/yr
Parallax (π)	66.356±0.041 mas
Distance	49.15±0.027 ly (15.07±0.01 pc)
Absolute magnitude (M_{V})	+0.986 / +1.886

α Geminorum C
Radial velocity (R_{v})	+2.5 km/s
Proper motion (μ)	RA: –201.406 mas/yr Dec.: –97.000 mas/yr
Parallax (π)	66.3110±0.0238 mas
Distance	49.19 ± 0.02 ly (15.080 ± 0.005 pc)
Absolute magnitude (M_{V})	+8.950

Details

α Geminorum Aa
Mass	2.371±0.015 M_{☉}
Radius	2.089±0.005 R_{☉}
Surface gravity (log g)	4.2 cgs
Temperature	10,286 K
Rotational velocity (v sin i)	18 km/s
Age	290 Myr

α Geminorum Ab
Mass	0.3859±0.0018 M_{☉}
Age	290 Myr

α Geminorum Ba
Mass	1.789±0.016 M_{☉}
Radius	1.648±0.011 R_{☉}
Surface gravity (log g)	4.0 cgs
Temperature	8,842 K
Rotational velocity (v sin i)	33 km/s
Age	290 Myr

α Geminorum Bb
Mass	0.3865±0.0020 M_{☉}
Age	290 Myr

α Geminorum Ca/Cb (Note: Their components are identical)
Mass	0.5992±0.0047 M_{☉}
Radius	0.6191±0.0057 R_{☉}
Luminosity	0.0733±0.0015 L_{☉}
Surface gravity (log g)	4.6317±0.0083 cgs
Temperature	3,820±100 K
Metallicity [Fe/H]	~0.0 dex
Rotational velocity (v sin i)	37±2 km/s
Age	290 Myr

Orbit
Primary	α Geminorum A
Secondary	α Geminorum B
Period (P)	459.1±2.3 yr
Semi-major axis (a)	6.722±0.021 " (101 AU) (Note: The linear semi-major axis was calculated dividing the angular semi-major axis by the parallax (both in the same unit). Values in milliarcseconds/mas should be divided by 1000 to convert to arcsec. The retrieved value will be the diameter in astronomical units, and need to be multiplied by 107.5 to convert from AU to R_{☉}.)
Eccentricity (e)	0.3382±0.0023
Inclination (i)	115.107±0.060°
Longitude of the node (Ω)	41.3°
Periastron epoch (T)	2,436,785
Argument of periastron (ω) (secondary)	251.84°

Orbit
Primary	α Geminorum Aa
Secondary	α Geminorum Ab
Period (P)	9.2127496(52) days
Semi-major axis (a)	8.002±0.014 mas (13 R_{☉})
Eccentricity (e)	0.48769(48)
Inclination (i)	35.00±0.24°
Longitude of the node (Ω)	95.100±0.093°
Periastron epoch (T)	HJD 2,455,817.79
Argument of periastron (ω) (primary)	264.968±0.085°
Semi-amplitude (K_{1}) (primary)	13.0933±0.0092 km/s

Orbit
Primary	α Geminorum Ba
Secondary	α Geminorum Bb
Period (P)	92.92835083(31) days
Semi-major axis (a)	3.4442±0.0093 mas (5.6 R_{☉})
Inclination (i)	110.50±0.12°
Longitude of the node (Ω)	106.47±0.19°
Periastron epoch (T)	HJD 2,456,705.49
Semi-amplitude (K_{1}) (primary)	32.0921±0.0064 km/s

Orbit
Primary	α Geminorum AB
Secondary	α Geminorum C
Period (P)	14,000 yr

Orbit
Primary	α Geminorum Ca
Secondary	α Geminorum Cb
Period (P)	0.814282212 days
Semi-major axis (a)	3.896 R_{☉} (Note: from a sin i / sin(i), with a sin i = 3.8882 R_{☉} and i = 86.29°.)
Eccentricity (e)	0
Inclination (i)	86.29±0.10°
Longitude of the node (Ω)	7.315°
Semi-amplitude (K_{1}) (primary)	121.18±0.42 km/s
Semi-amplitude (K_{2}) (secondary)	120.51±0.42 km/s

Other designations
- Castor, α Gem, 66 Geminorum, FK5 287, GJ 278, HIP 36850, SAO 60198
- A: BD+32°1581A, HD 60179, HR 2891, PLX 1785.00
- B: BD+32°1581B, HD 60178, HR 2890
- C: YY Geminorum, BD+32°1582

Database references
SIMBAD	data
- Castor A
- Castor B
- Castor C (YY Gem)

Castor is the second-brightest object in the zodiac constellation of Gemini. It has the Bayer designation α Geminorum, which is Latinised to Alpha Geminorum and abbreviated Alpha Gem or α Gem. With an apparent visual magnitude of 1.58, it is one of the brightest stars in the night sky. Castor appears singular to the naked eye, but it is actually a sextuple star system organized into three binary pairs. Although it is the 'α' (alpha) member of the constellation, it is half a magnitude fainter than 'β' (beta) Geminorum, Pollux.

== Stellar system ==
Aa
Period = 9.2128 d
Ab
Separation = 6.0″
Ba
Period = 2.9283 d
Bb
Separation = 71″
Ca
Period = 0.814 d
Cb

Hierarchy of orbits in the Castor system

Castor is a multiple star system made up of six individual stars; there are three visual components, all of which are spectroscopic binaries. Appearing to the naked eye as a single star, Castor was first recorded as a double star in 1718 by James Pound, but it may have been resolved into at least two sources of light by Cassini as early as 1678. The separation between the binary systems Castor A and Castor B has increased from about 2″ (2 arcseconds of angular measurement) in 1970 to about 6″ in 2026. These pairs have magnitudes of 1.9 and 3.0, respectively.

Castor Aa and Ba both have orbits of a few days with a much fainter companion.

Castor C, or YY Geminorum, was discovered to vary in brightness with a regular period. It is an eclipsing binary with additional variations due to areas of different brightness on the surface of one or both stars, as well as irregular flares. The Castor C components orbit in less than a day. Castor C is believed to be in orbit around Castor AB, but with an extremely long period of several thousand years. It is 73″ distant from the bright components.

The combined apparent magnitude of all six stars is +1.58.

== Physical properties ==
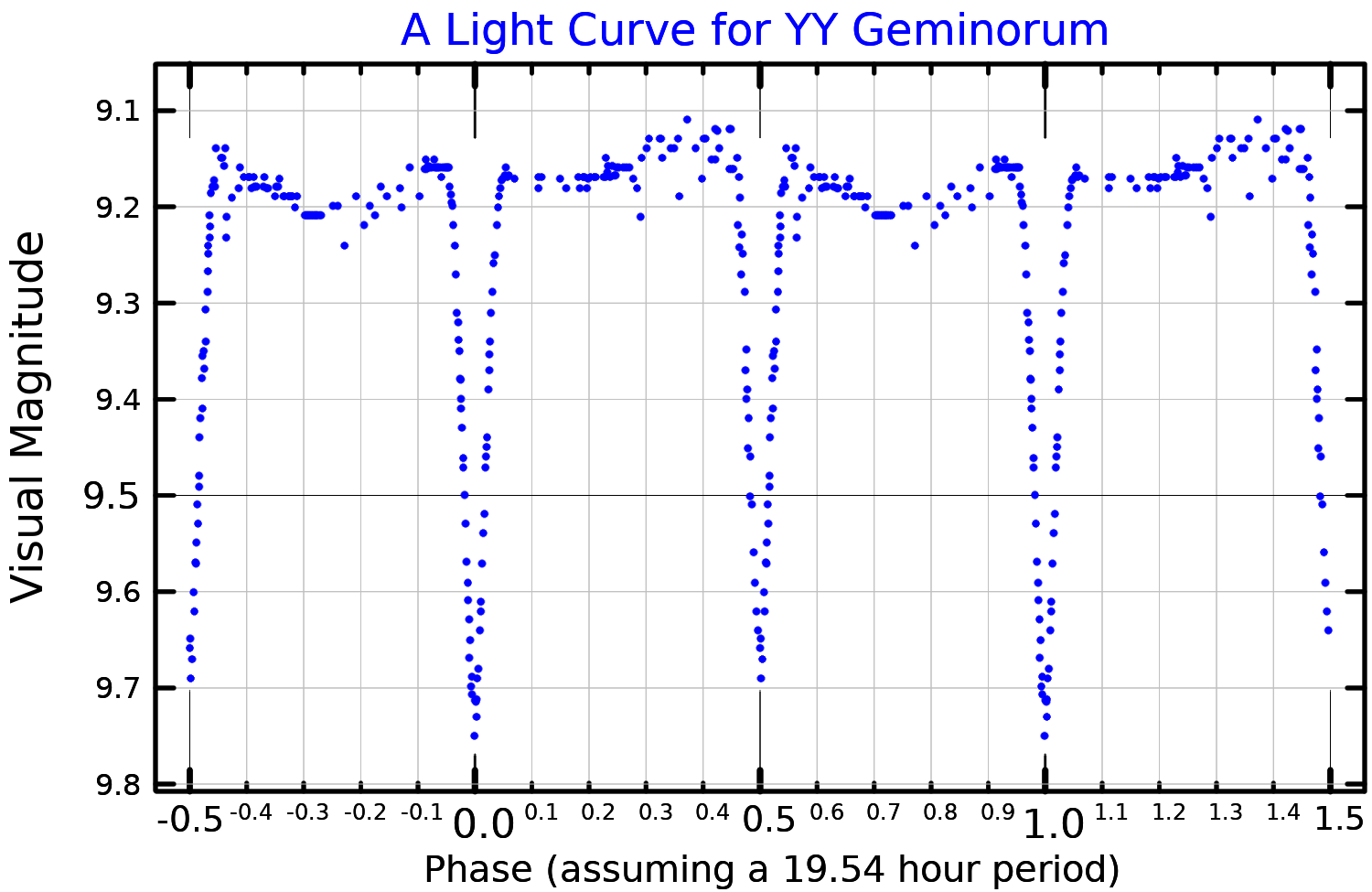
A visual band light curve for YY Geminorum (Castor C), adapted from Butler et al. (2015)

Castor is 49 light-years away from Earth, determined from its large annual parallax.

The two brightest stars are both A-type main-sequence stars, more massive and brighter than the Sun. The properties of their red dwarf companions are difficult to determine, but they are known to have masses 39% that of the Sun.

Castor B is an Am star, with particularly strong spectral lines of certain metals.

Castor C is a variable star, classified as a BY Draconis type. BY Draconis variables are cool dwarf stars which vary as they rotate due to starspots or other variations in their photospheres. The two red dwarfs of Castor C are almost identical, with masses around 0.6 M_{☉} and luminosities less than 10% of the Sun. Since 2018 it is suspected a brown dwarf with a mass at least 49±7 times the mass of Jupiter might be orbiting Castor C with a period of 50 years.

All the red dwarfs in the Castor system have emissions lines in their spectra, and all are flare stars.

== Etymology and culture ==
α Geminorum (Latinised to Alpha Geminorum) is the star system's Bayer designation.

Castor and Pollux are the two "heavenly twin" stars that give the constellation Gemini (meaning twins in Latin) its name. The name Castor refers specifically to Castor, one of the twin sons of Zeus and Leda in Greek and Roman mythology.

The star was annotated by the Arabic description Ras al Taum al Muqadim رأس التوأم المقدم, which translates as the head of the foremost twin. In the catalogue of stars in the Calendarium of al Achsasi al Mouakket, this star was designated Aoul al Dzira أول الذراع, which was translated into Latin as Prima Brachii, meaning the first in the paw.

In Chinese, 北河 (Běi Hé), meaning North River, refers to an asterism consisting of Castor, Rho Geminorum, and Pollux. Consequently, Castor itself is known as 北河二 (Běi Hé èr, English: the Second Star of North River.)

In 2016, the International Astronomical Union organized a Working Group on Star Names (WGSN) to catalog and standardize proper names for stars. The WGSN's first bulletin of July 2016 included a table of the first two batches of names approved by the WGSN; which included Castor for the star α Geminorum Aa.

Castor C also has the variable-star designation YY Geminorum.

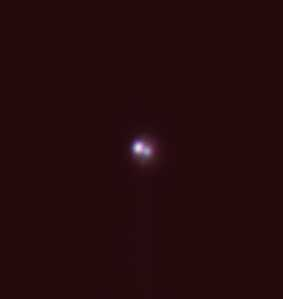
The Castor AB pair resolved

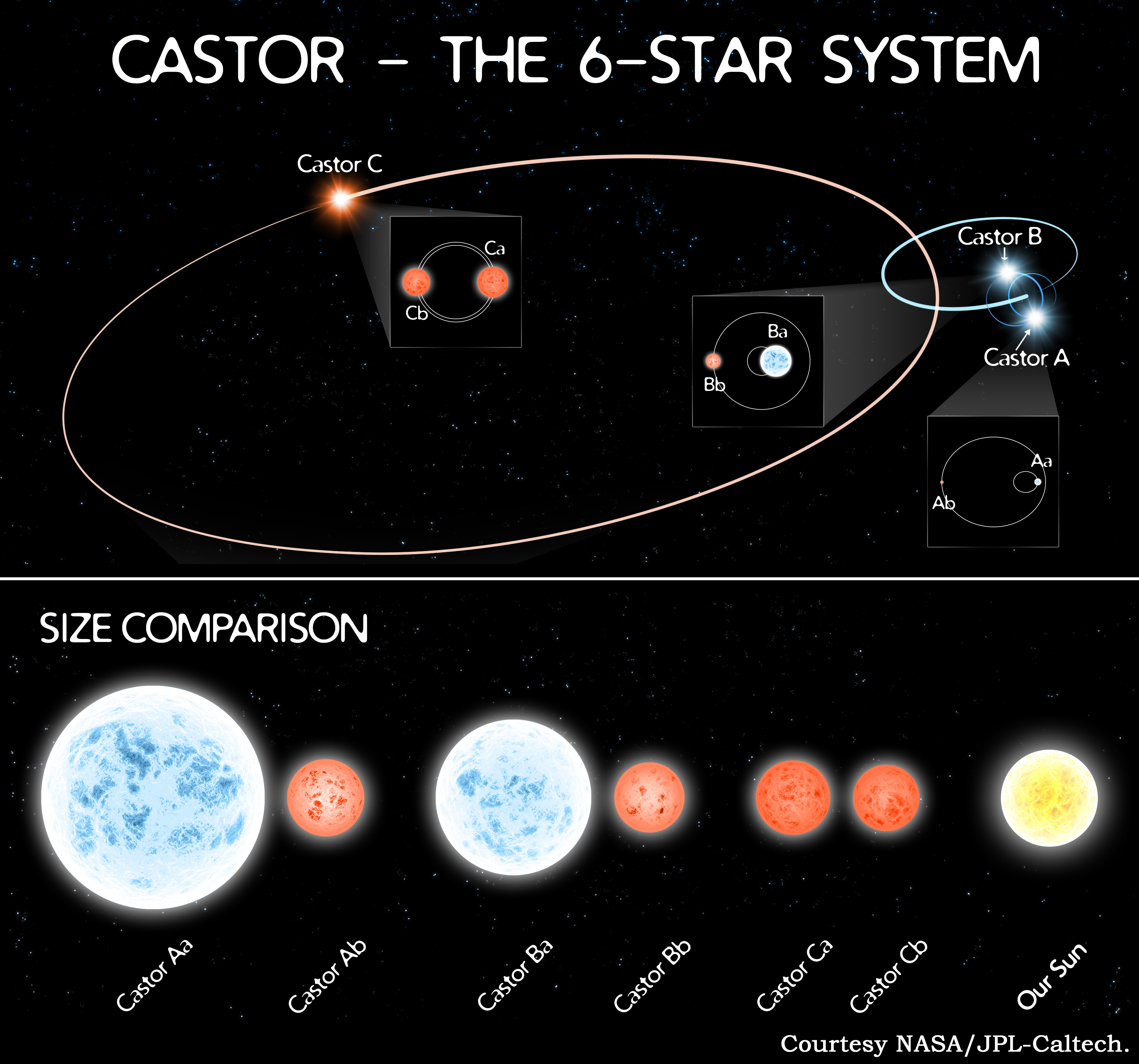
Components

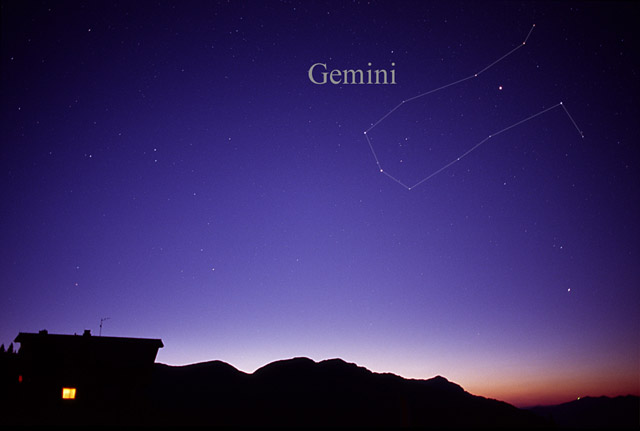
Castor is one of the two brightest stars in the constellation of Gemini (top left star).

== See also ==
- List of brightest stars
- List of nearest bright stars
- Historical brightest stars
