= HD 59686 Ab =

Extrasolar planet in the constellation Gemini

Discovery
- Discovered by: Mitchell et al., Ortiz et al.
- Discovery site: Lick Observatory
- Discovery date: November 16, 2003 (announced); October 2016 (published)
- Detection method: Doppler spectroscopy

Orbital characteristics
- Epoch 2451482.024
- Semi-major axis: 1.0860+0.0006 −0.0007 AU
- Eccentricity: 0.05+0.03 −0.02
- Orbital period (sidereal): 299.36+0.26 −0.31 d
- Mean anomaly: 301°+26° −85°
- Argument of periastron: 121°+28° −24°
- Star: HD 59686 A

Physical characteristics
- Mass: ≥6.92+0.18 −0.24 M_{J}

HD 59686 Ab is an exoplanet that orbits the giant star HD 59686 A in a close binary star system. It has a nearly circular orbit with a period of 300 days and a semi-major axis of 1.09 AU, slightly greater than the distance between Earth and the Sun. It has a minimum mass 6.9 times that of Jupiter, with the true mass depending on the orbital inclination, which is not yet known. HD 59686 Ab was discovered by radial velocity and first announced in November 2003, but the discovery was not formally published until 2016.

HD 59686, along with Nu Octantis, is one of the closest binary star systems known to host a planet orbiting a single star (i.e., not a circumbinary planet), posing a challenge to theories of planet formation.
