= Gemini OB1 Molecular Cloud =

Molecular cloud complex in the constellation Gemini

Gemini OB1 Molecular Cloud Complex
Emission nebula
- H II region

Observation data: J2000 epoch
- Right ascension: 06^{h} 15^{m}
- Declination: 22° 41′ 31″
- Distance: 4900–6500 ly (1500–2000 pc)
- Constellation: Gemini
- Designations: Gem OB1 (OB association) IC 443/444 - NGC 2174/5 - Sh2-247/9

The Gemini OB1 Molecular Cloud Complex (or Gem OB1 Complex) is a vast star-forming region located in the western part of the constellation of Gemini; it consists of a collection of giant molecular clouds, H II regions, and bright stars such as blue giants and blue stars, which are part of the stellar association Gem OB1.

Some regions of the complex extend into the northern part of Orion, as in the case of NGC 2175 (Sh2-252); numerous studies conducted in this area of the sky show that star formation processes are still ongoing in some of the densest clouds, partly driven by the action of the stellar wind from the most massive stars of the Gem OB1 association.

== Observation ==
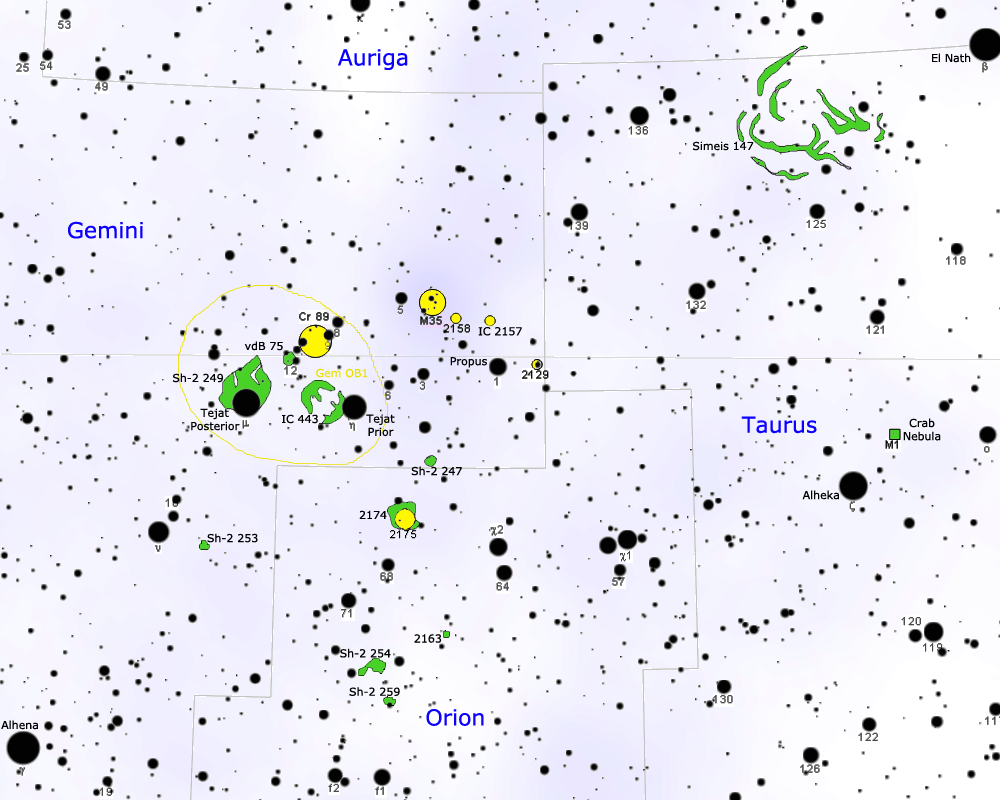
Map of the Gem OB1 region.

The Gem OB1 region occupies the westernmost part of the constellation of Gemini, extending slightly into the adjacent constellations of Orion and Taurus. The most easily observable objects in this complex are the stellar associations, composed of stars starting from the seventh magnitude and included in the open clusters NGC 2129 and possibly Cr 89; the latter cluster, in particular, is located toward the central region of the association and consists of recognizable blue stars even with a binocular, although it does not show a particularly evident concentration. Using a powerful amateur telescope, equipped with filters, it is possible to identify and photograph the associated nebular regions, among which IC 443, also known as the Jellyfish Nebula, stands out, a supernova remnant whose identification is facilitated by the presence of the star μ Geminorum, a red giant located much closer in the foreground than the cloud, at just 349 light-years from the Solar System. In the same field of view, with small instruments, the open cluster M35 can also be seen, although it is not physically linked to the complex, being located in the foreground.

The region crosses the local meridian around ten in the evening at the end of January, making the best period for its observation in the evening sky the months of late autumn and winter in the Northern Hemisphere, up to mid-spring; due to its northern declination, the region is more easily visible from the Northern Hemisphere, while observers at southern latitudes face greater difficulties. The region remains observable from all populated areas of the Earth, up to the coasts of Antarctica. The ecliptic passes just one degree north of the complex, so it is common for planets of the Solar System and the Moon to be observed in its direction, which can significantly interfere with its observation; the Sun passes through it between June 24 and 27.

== Structure and galactic environment ==
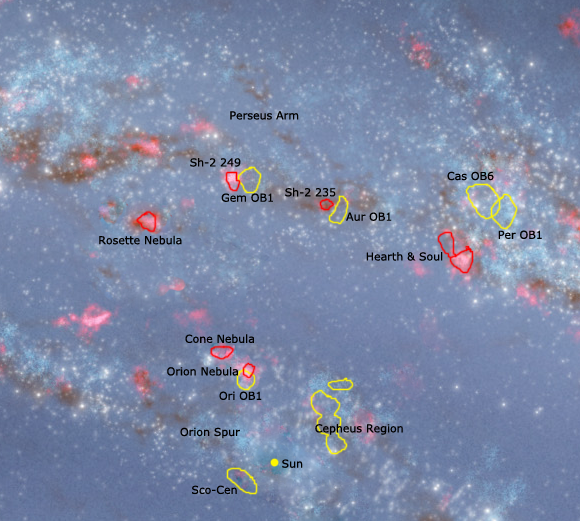
Map of the main H II regions located between the Sun and the Perseus Arm in the direction of Gem OB1.

The Gem OB1 complex is located in the closest part of the Perseus Arm, the spiral arm of the Milky Way immediately exterior to the Orion Arm, which includes the Solar System. The line of sight in its direction intersects a large number of celestial objects, including star clusters of varying ages and nebulae of different types; many of these objects are not physically connected to the complex itself but appear close due to a perspective effect.

Among these objects, the most notable is the bright open cluster M35, one of the most easily observable objects in this area of the sky; located at a distance of about 860 parsecs (2600 light-years), this cluster lies within the Orion Arm, though in its outer regions. The cluster contains some stars of spectral class B and over a thousand stars, with an estimated age of about 180 million years, providing further evidence that the cluster and the complex are entirely distinct objects.

The galactic plane along the line of sight between the Sun and the complex appears to be particularly clear, such that its components are clearly visible without significant obscuration by dark clouds; the only nebular regions visible in this direction and belonging to the Orion Arm are the small molecular clouds BFS48, BFS49, and BFS50, the first associated with a giant molecular cloud and the other two with obscured open clusters visible in the infrared, cataloged as [BDS2003] 76 and [BDS2003] 77, respectively.

Slightly west of M35 lies a small open cluster cataloged as NGC 2129; according to some studies, its distance is 1515 pc with an age of about 12 million years, while others suggest a distance of about 2200 pc and an age of around 10 million years. In both cases, the cluster appears to be directly connected to the Gem OB1 association; it contains two blue supergiants of spectral class B2I (HD 40003 and HD 250290) and a blue giant of class B3III cataloged as HD 250241.

Collinder 89 (Cr 89), finally, is a highly dispersed cluster whose distance is sometimes debated; some studies give a distance of about 2480 pc and consider it a likely member of the association, physically linked to a cloud of ionized gas, while one of its stars, the blue supergiant HD 255055, is part of the association and considered one of the main ionizing stars of the surrounding gas clouds. Other studies, however, place the cluster at a distance of just 800 pc.

== Star-forming regions ==
=== Inner regions ===
Sh2-249 is a flame-shaped H II region located in the direction of the star μ Geminorum, whose light interferes with its observation; the ionization source that causes the cloud's illumination is believed to come from the stellar wind of three massive spectral class B stars, cataloged as HD 43753, HD 43818, and HD 255091, with some studies also including the blue class O star HD 255055, a member of the Cr 89 cluster. Depending on the determination of the ionizing stars, different distances are obtained: in the study including HD 255055, the distance is only 800 pc, while those excluding it place it at about 1250 pc or 1600 pc; the latter studies place Sh2-249 within the Gem OB1 region, in association with the H II region cataloged as BFS51, some reflection nebulae, including the prominent vdB 75, and dark nebulae, cataloged as LDN 1564, LDN 1567, and LDN 1568. Others also include LBN 845 and IC 444 among the associated nebulae.

Sh2-247 is a small H II region with a diameter of about 8'; it contains a white-blue main-sequence star of class B0V and features spatially distinct filamentary structures, one of which has a radial velocity of about 2 km s^{−1} and extends along the eastern edge of the cloud, almost certainly physically linked to the H II region, while a second filament with a velocity of about 10–12 km s^{−1} extends southward toward Sh2-252. There is also a third filament, with a radial velocity similar to the first, extending outward. In the northern part, the nebula's boundary is sharp, indicating contact with a very dense, unilluminated cloud.

=== Sh2-252 ===
Sh2-252, also known as the Monkey Head Nebula or with the designation W13, is a large H II region extending about 25' within the boundaries of the Orion constellation; it is sometimes identified with the designation NGC 2175, referring to an open cluster that may not physically exist, as the stars visible in the central-southern part of the nebula belong to ten distinct groups located at distances ranging from 410 to 8100 parsecs. In this direction lies a blue star cataloged as HD 42088, with a magnitude of 7.55, which is one of the main sources responsible for the electric arc of the nebula; its physical position is in a region of intersection between two or possibly three clouds of neutral atomic hydrogen (H_{2}). In addition to this star, others contribute to the ionization, including the white-blue dwarf LSV+20 16, of spectral class B1V, likely a Herbig Be star.

Within the nebula, a large number of young stars are known; among these are IRAS sources, notably 06055+2039, which contains a cluster of stars aged only 2–3 million years, deeply embedded in a very dense molecular cloud with a mass of about 7000 to 9000 solar masses. Additionally, five radio wave sources are known, cataloged with letters A to E, of which four are compact (Sh2-252A, Sh2-252B, Sh2-252C, and Sh2-252E) and one (Sh2-252F) is more diffuse and ionized by the star HD 42088; there is also a source cataloged as Sh2-252D, which may correspond to an object outside the Milky Way. Sh2-252E is associated with a cluster containing 21 stars embedded in the brightest region of the Sh2-252 nebula, including two class B stars and one class A star. Additionally, water and OH masers have been discovered.

Distance measurements for this nebula vary depending on the studies, generally ranging between 2000 pc and 2200 parsecs; in both cases, the region lies within the sector occupied by the Gem OB1 association.

=== IC 443 ===
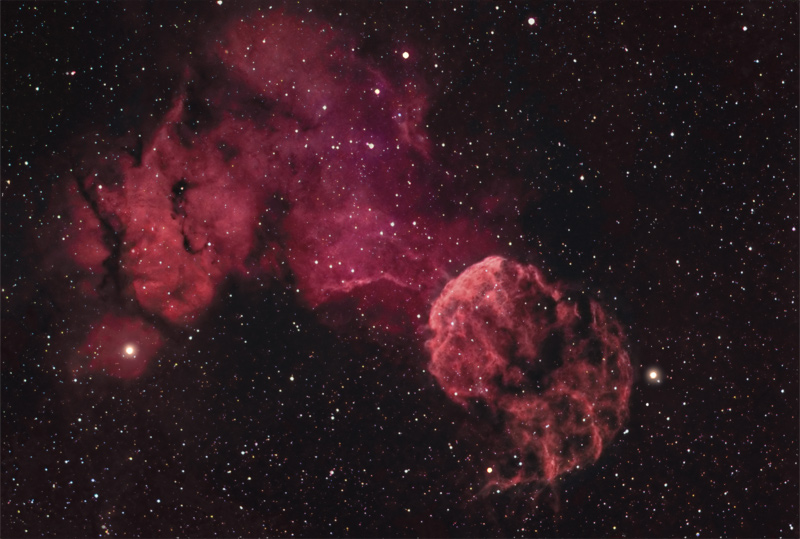
The supernova remnant IC 443.

IC 443 (the Jellyfish Nebula) is a large supernova remnant with a diameter of about 45', located near the region hosting the Gem OB1 association; given its distance of about 1500 pc, it is believed that the progenitor star was one of the most massive members of the association, whose collapsed core is now the pulsar CXOU J061705.3+222127. The nebula, both in the visible and radio wavelengths, has a shell-like shape, consisting of two halves with different radii and centers; a third nebular shell, initially attributed to IC 443, is now recognized as an older supernova remnant, possibly 100,000 years old, called G189.6+3.3. The age of the object remains uncertain; there is some agreement that the event that created the nebula occurred between 3,000 and 30,000 years ago. Observations conducted with the Chandra X-ray Observatory and the XMM-Newton identified the pulsar near the southern ring.

The gases composing it are interacting with a molecular cloud and a nearby H I region; the surrounding interstellar medium, due to the collision with the expanding bubble created by the supernova explosion, produces faint emissions in X-rays, which correspond to the filaments clearly visible in radio waves.The supernova explosion and the resulting shock wave affecting the surrounding clouds' gases may trigger star formation processes within them; however, the young stars present in the region predate the explosion event, indicating that such processes have not yet begun.

=== Minor regions ===
Sh2-254, Sh2-255, Sh2-257, and Sh2-258 form a group of small, compact H II regions part of the same molecular cloud and interacting with the Gem OB1 region; the ^{13}CO emission identified by the Palomar Sky Survey delineates the boundaries of the larger region, Sh2-254, and is stronger between it and the other clouds. Additionally, while ^{12}CO emissions are distributed gradually and diffusely outside the optically visible H II regions, ^{13}CO emissions highlight filamentary structures of molecular gas.

One of the most evident signs of the expansion of the Gem OB1 molecular cloud is an arc structure extending about 1.5° along the southeastern edge of the region encompassing the Sh2-254/258 clouds, with a radial velocity of about -12 km s^{−1} and connected to the BFS 52 region.

== Gemini OB1 association ==
The Gem OB1 association is an OB association with a distance of about 1500–1900 pc; there is no consensus on its exact distance, as various values have been proposed over time. The only point of agreement is that the association and the gas clouds visible in its direction are physically connected and thus roughly located in the same region. The association consists of 20 massive stars, including 4 of class O, 13 of class B, and 3 of class M; the latter are red supergiants, the first to have evolved due to their large mass, greater than that of the other stars in Gem OB1.

A study presented in 1995 on the region highlighted that, although the clouds associated with Gem OB1 contain several star-forming sites, as described above, most of the clouds associated with it are not currently active in this regard; however, the structure of the clouds observed at various wavelengths suggests that the expanding bubbles originating from the H II regions, caused by the stellar wind of the hottest and most massive stars in the association, have created a high-density molecular cloud in which star formation processes have occurred, as evidenced by the presence of IRAS sources associated with young stars.

== See also ==
- H II region
- Perseus Arm

== Bibliography ==
=== General Texts ===
- O'Meara, Stephen James (2007). Deep Sky Companions: Hidden Treasures. Cambridge University Press. ISBN 978-0-521-83704-0.
- Burnham, Robert (1978). Burnham's Celestial Handbook: Volume Two. New York: Dover Publications, Inc.
- Chaisson; McMillan (1993). Astronomy Today. Englewood Cliffs: Prentice-Hall, Inc. ISBN 0-13-240085-5.
- Arny, Thomas T. (2007). Explorations: An Introduction to Astronomy (3 updated ed.). Boston: McGraw-Hill. ISBN 978-0-07-321369-9.
- AA.VV (2002). L'Universo - Grande enciclopedia dell'astronomia [The Universe - Great Encyclopedia of Astronomy] (in Italian). Novara: De Agostini.
- Gribbin, J. (2005). Enciclopedia di astronomia e cosmologia [Encyclopedia of Astronomy and Cosmology] (in Italian). Milano: Garzanti. ISBN 88-11-50517-8.
- Owen, W. (2006). Atlante illustrato dell'Universo [Illustrated Atlas of the Universe] (in Italian). Milano: Il Viaggiatore. ISBN 88-365-3679-4.
- Lindstrom, J. (2006). Stelle, galassie e misteri cosmici [Stars, Galaxies, and Cosmic Mysteries] (in Italian). Trieste: Editoriale Scienza. ISBN 88-7307-326-3.

=== Specific Texts ===
==== On Stellar Evolution ====
- Lada, C. J.; Kylafits, N. D. (1999). The Origin of Stars and Planetary Systems. Kluwer Academic Publishers. ISBN 0-7923-5909-7.
- De Blasi, A. (2002). Le stelle: nascita, evoluzione e morte [Stars: Birth, Evolution, and Death] (in Italian). Bologna: CLUEB. ISBN 88-491-1832-5.
- Abbondi, C. (2007). Universo in evoluzione dalla nascita alla morte delle stelle [Evolving Universe from the Birth to the Death of Stars] (in Italian). Sandit. ISBN 978-88-89150-32-0.
- Hack, M. (2004). Dove nascono le stelle. Dalla vita ai quark: un viaggio a ritroso alle origini dell'Universo [Where Stars Are Born: From Life to Quarks, a Journey Back to the Origins of the Universe] (in Italian). Milano: Sperling & Kupfer. ISBN 88-8274-912-6.

==== On the Gemini OB1 Region ====
- Reipurth, B.; Yan, C.-H. (2008). Star Formation and Molecular Clouds towards the Galactic Anti-Center (pdf). Handbook of Star Forming Regions, Volume I: The Northern Sky ASP Monograph Publications, Bo Reipurth. p. 869. Bibcode:2008hsf1.book..869R. ISBN 978-1-58381-670-7.

=== Star Charts ===
- Taki, Toshimi (2005). "Taki's 8.5 Magnitude Star Atlas". Archived from the original on 2018-11-05. - Freely downloadable star atlas in PDF format.
- Tirion; Rappaport; Lovi (1987). Uranometria 2000.0 - Volume I - The Northern Hemisphere to -6°. Richmond, Virginia, USA: Willmann-Bell, inc. ISBN 0-943396-14-X.
- Tirion; Sinnott (1998). Sky Atlas 2000.0 (2 ed.). Cambridge, USA: Cambridge University Press. ISBN 0-933346-90-5.
- Tirion (2001). The Cambridge Star Atlas 2000.0 (3 ed.). Cambridge, USA: Cambridge University Press. ISBN 0-521-80084-6.
