= Chandra X-ray Observatory =

NASA space telescope launched in 1999

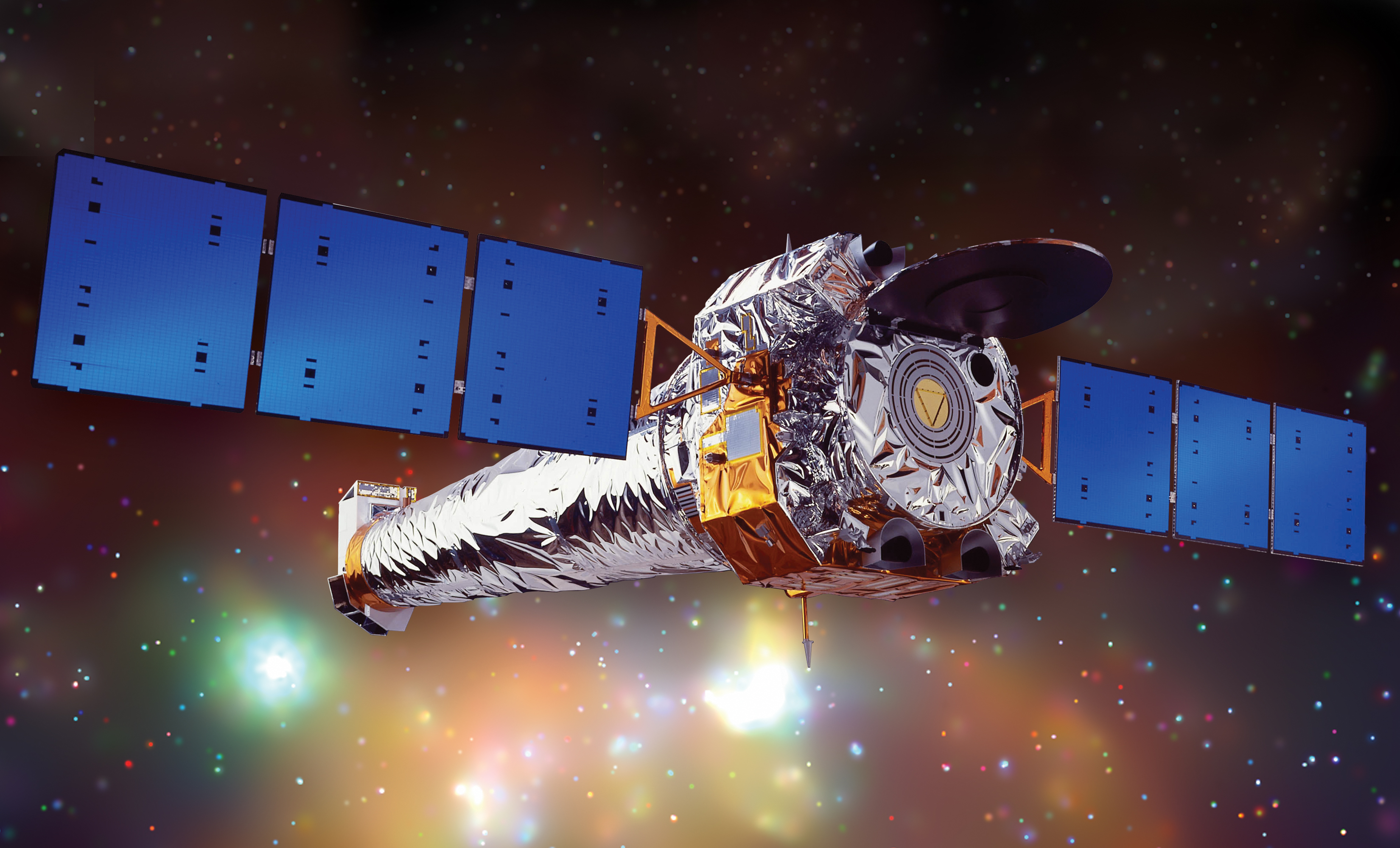
- Illustration of Chandra
- Names: Advanced X-ray Astrophysics Facility (AXAF)
- Mission type: X-ray astronomy
- Operator: NASA / SAO / CXC
- COSPAR ID: 1999-040B
- SATCAT no.: 25867
- Website: chandra.harvard.edu
- Mission duration: Planned: 5 years; Elapsed: 27 years, 3 months, 14 days

Spacecraft properties
- Manufacturer: TRW Inc.
- Launch mass: 5,860 kg (12,930 lb)
- Dry mass: 4,790 kg (10,560 lb)
- Dimensions: Deployed: 13.8 × 19.5 m (45.3 × 64.0 ft); Stowed: 11.8 × 4.3 m (38.7 × 14.0 ft)
- Power: 2,350 W

Start of mission
- Launch date: July 23, 1999, 04:30:59.984 UTC
- Rocket: Space Shuttle Columbia (STS-93)
- Launch site: Kennedy Space Center Launch Complex 39B

Orbital parameters
- Reference system: Geocentric
- Regime: Highly elliptical
- Semi-major axis: 80,795.9 km (50,204.2 mi)
- Eccentricity: 0.743972
- Perigee altitude: 14,307.9 km (8,890.5 mi)
- Apogee altitude: 134,527.6 km (83,591.6 mi)
- Inclination: 76.7156°
- Period: 3809.3 min
- RAAN: 305.3107°
- Argument of perigee: 267.2574°
- Mean anomaly: 0.3010°
- Mean motion: 0.3780 rev/day
- Epoch: September 4, 2015, 04:37:54 UTC
- Revolution no.: 1358

Main telescope
- Type: Wolter type 1
- Diameter: 1.2 m (3.9 ft)
- Focal length: 10.0 m (32.8 ft)
- Collecting area: 0.04 m^{2} (0.43 sq ft)
- Wavelengths: X-ray: 0.12–12 nm (0.1–10 keV)
- Resolution: 0.5 arcsec
Instruments
- ACIS: Advanced CCD Imaging Spectrometer
- HRC: High Resolution Camera
- HETG: High Energy Transmission Grating
- LETG: Low Energy Transmission Grating
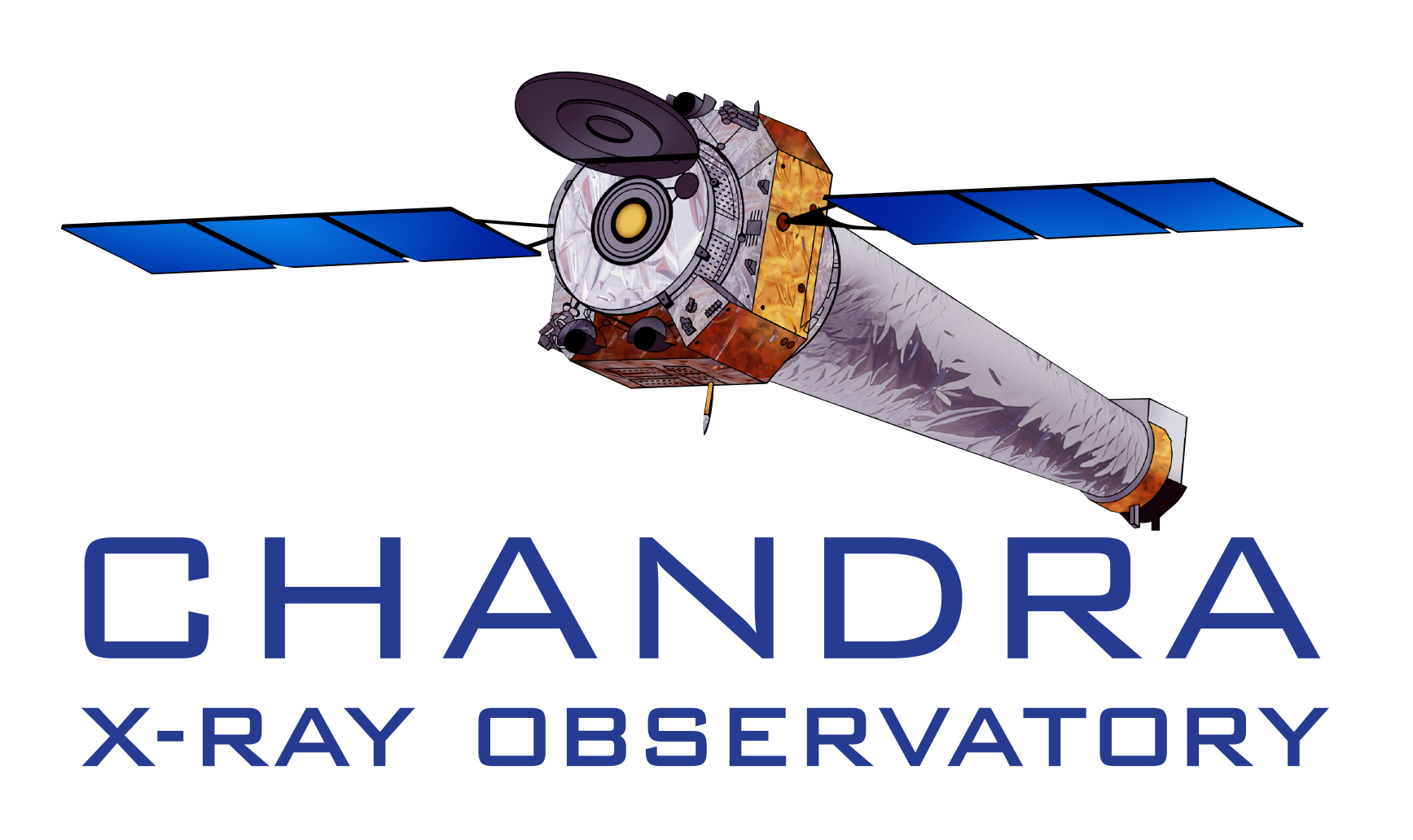
- Chandra X-ray Observatory mission logo NASA Great Observatories Large Strategic Science Missions (Astrophysics Division)

The Chandra X-ray Observatory (CXO), previously known as the Advanced X-ray Astrophysics Facility (AXAF), is a space telescope launched aboard the Space Shuttle Columbia during STS-93 by NASA on July 23, 1999. Chandra is sensitive to X-ray sources 100 times fainter than any previous X-ray telescope, enabled by the high angular resolution of its mirrors. Since the Earth's atmosphere absorbs the vast majority of X-rays, they are not detectable from Earth-based telescopes; therefore space-based telescopes are required to make these observations. Chandra is an Earth satellite in a 64-hour orbit, and its mission is ongoing as of 2025. Chandra is one of the Great Observatories, along with the Hubble Space Telescope, Compton Gamma Ray Observatory (1991–2000), and the Spitzer Space Telescope (2003–2020). The telescope is named after the Nobel Prize-winning Indian-American astrophysicist Subrahmanyan Chandrasekhar. Its mission is similar to that of ESA's XMM-Newton spacecraft, also launched in 1999 but the two telescopes have different design foci, as Chandra has a much higher angular resolution and XMM-Newton higher spectroscopy throughput.

In response to a decrease in NASA funding in 2024 by the US Congress, Chandra is threatened with an early cancellation despite having more than a decade of operation left. The cancellation has sardonically been referred to as a potential "extinction-level" event for X-ray astronomy in the US. A group of astronomers have put together a public outreach project to try to get enough American citizens to persuade the US Congress to provide enough funding to avoid early termination of the observatory.

== History ==
In 1976, the Chandra X-ray Observatory (called AXAF at the time) was proposed to NASA by Riccardo Giacconi and Harvey Tananbaum. Preliminary work began the following year at Marshall Space Flight Center (MSFC) and the Smithsonian Astrophysical Observatory (SAO), where the telescope is now operated for NASA at the Chandra X-ray Center in the Center for Astrophysics | Harvard & Smithsonian. In the meantime, in 1978, NASA launched the first imaging X-ray telescope, Einstein (HEAO-2), into orbit. Work continued on the AXAF project throughout the 1980s and 1990s. In 1992, to reduce costs, the spacecraft was redesigned. Four of the twelve planned mirrors were eliminated, as were two of the six scientific instruments. AXAF's planned orbit was changed to an elliptical one, reaching one third of the way to the Moon's at its farthest point. This eliminated the possibility of improvement or repair by the Space Shuttle but put the observatory above the Earth's radiation belts for most of its orbit. AXAF was assembled and tested by TRW (now Northrop Grumman Aerospace Systems) in Redondo Beach, California.

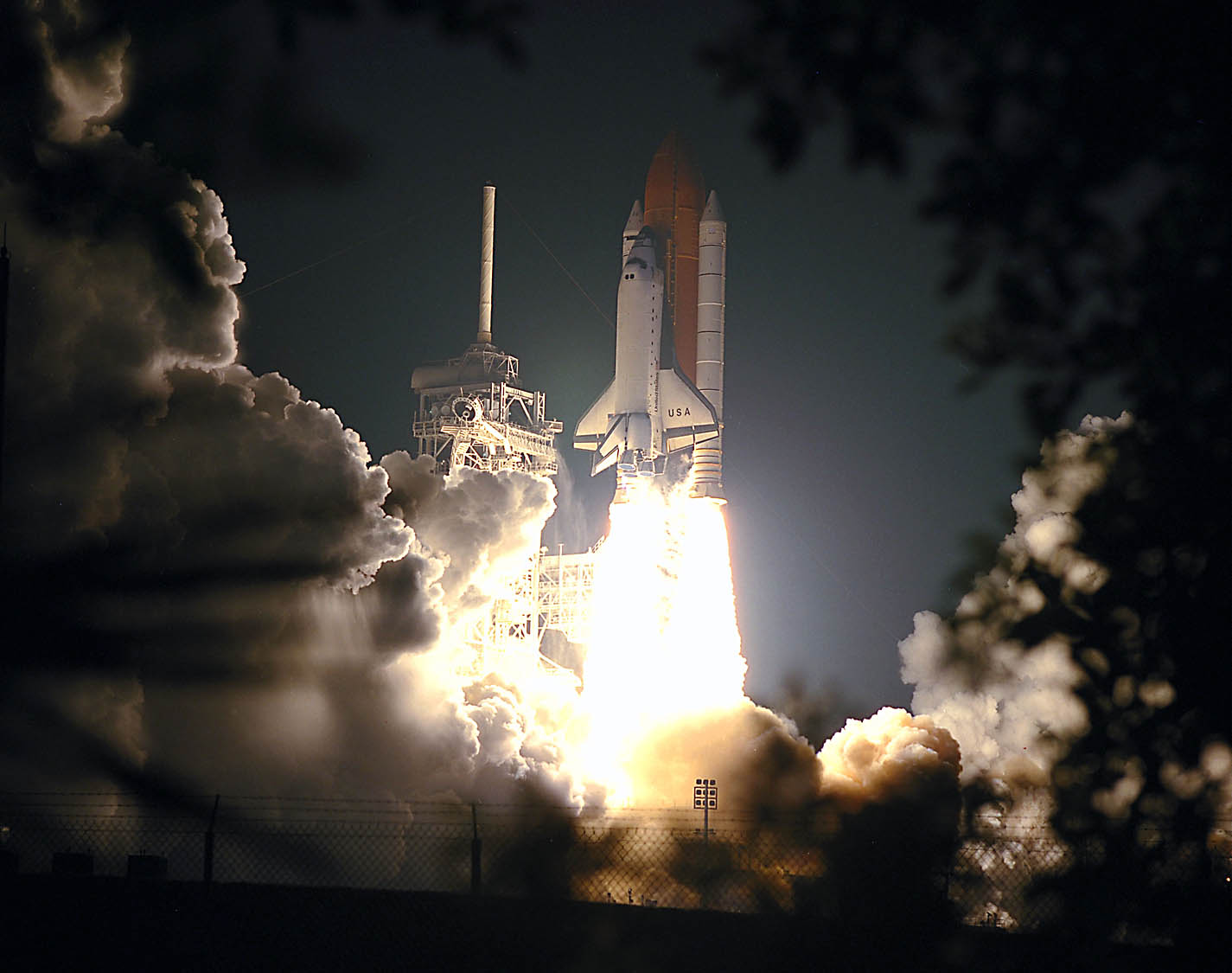
Space Shuttle Columbia, STS-93 launches in 1999

AXAF was renamed Chandra as part of a contest held by NASA in 1998, which drew more than 6,000 submissions worldwide. The contest winners, Jatila van der Veen and Tyrel Johnson (then a high school teacher and high school student, respectively), suggested the name in honor of Nobel Prize–winning Indian-American astrophysicist Subrahmanyan Chandrasekhar. He is known for his work in determining the maximum mass of white dwarf stars, leading to greater understanding of high energy astronomical phenomena such as neutron stars and black holes. Fittingly, the name Chandra means "moon" in Sanskrit.

Originally scheduled to be launched in December 1998, the spacecraft was delayed several months, eventually being launched on July 23, 1999, at 04:31 UTC by Space Shuttle Columbia during STS-93. Chandra was deployed by Cady Coleman from Columbia at 11:47 UTC. The Inertial Upper Stage's first stage motor ignited at 12:48 UTC, and after burning for 125 seconds and separating, the second stage ignited at 12:51 UTC and burned for 117 seconds. At 22,753 kilograms (50,162 lb), it was the heaviest payload ever launched by the shuttle, a consequence of the two-stage Inertial Upper Stage booster rocket system needed to transport the spacecraft to its high orbit.

Chandra has been returning data since the month after it launched. It is operated by the SAO at the Chandra X-ray Center in Cambridge, Massachusetts, with assistance from MIT and Northrop Grumman Space Technology. The ACIS CCDs suffered particle damage during early radiation belt passages. To prevent further damage, the instrument is now removed from the telescope's focal plane during passages.

Although Chandra was initially given an expected lifetime of 5 years, on September 4, 2001, NASA extended its lifetime to 10 years "based on the observatory's outstanding results." Physically Chandra could last much longer. A 2004 study performed at the Chandra X-ray Center indicated that the observatory could last at least 15 years. It is active as of 2026 and has an upcoming schedule of observations published by the Chandra X-ray Center.

In July 2008, the International X-ray Observatory, a joint project between ESA, NASA and JAXA, was proposed as the next major X-ray observatory but was later canceled. ESA later resurrected a downsized version of the project as the Advanced Telescope for High Energy Astrophysics (ATHENA), with a proposed launch in 2028.

On October 10, 2018, Chandra entered safe mode operations, due to a gyroscope glitch. NASA reported that all science instruments were safe. Within days, the 3-second error in data from one gyro was understood, and plans were made to return Chandra to full service. The gyroscope that experienced the glitch was placed in reserve and is otherwise healthy.

In March 2024, Congress decided to reduce funding for NASA and its missions. This may lead to the premature end of this mission. In June 2024, Senators urged NASA to reconsider the cuts to Chandra, which was accepted.

== Example discoveries ==
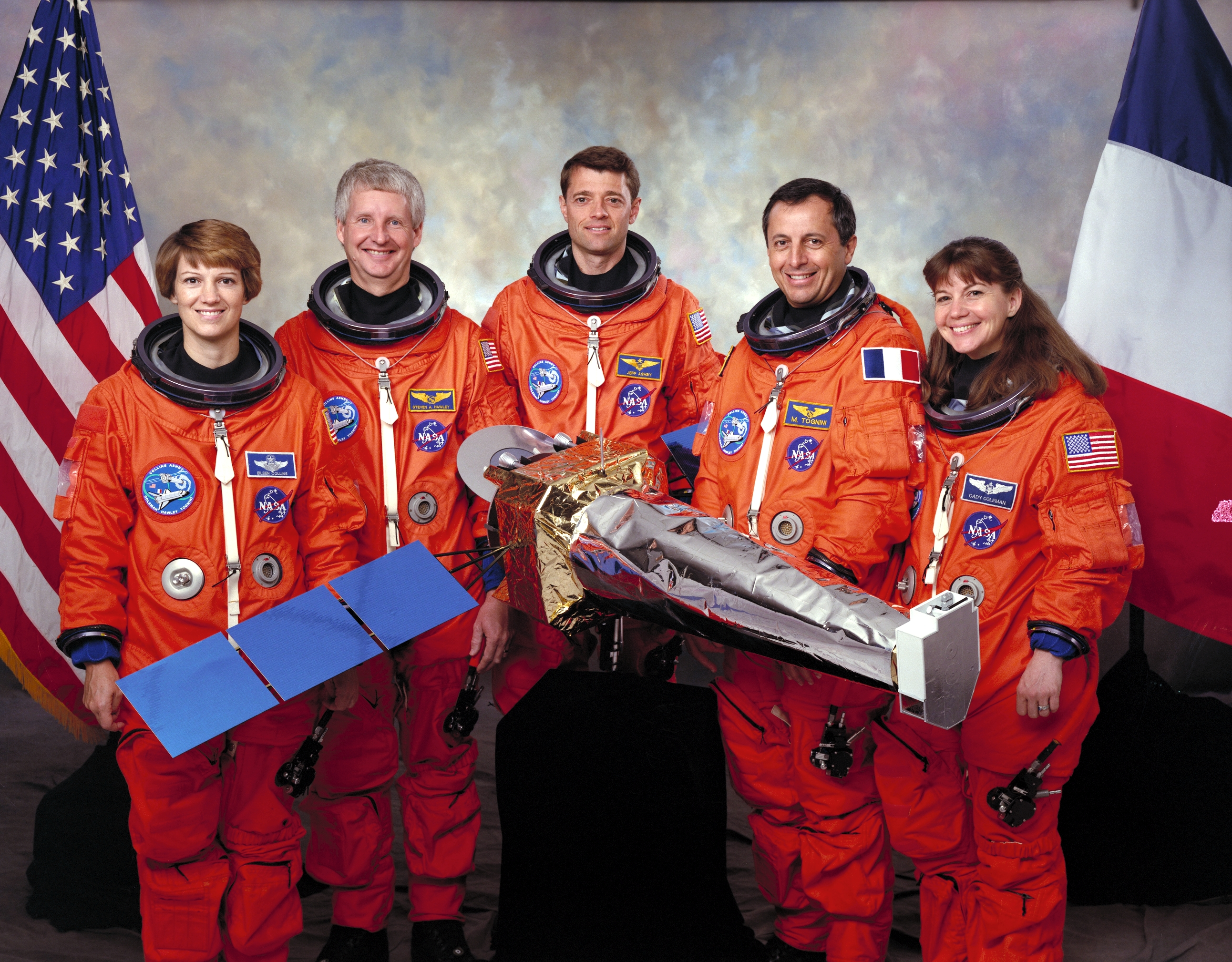
Crew of STS-93 with a scale model

The data gathered by Chandra has greatly advanced the field of X-ray astronomy. Here are some examples of discoveries supported by observations from Chandra:

- The first light image, of supernova remnant Cassiopeia A, gave astronomers their first glimpse of the compact object at the center of the remnant, probably a neutron star or black hole.
- In the Crab Nebula, another supernova remnant, Chandra showed a never-before-seen ring around the central pulsar and jets that had only been partially seen by earlier telescopes.
- The first X-ray emission was seen from the supermassive black hole, Sagittarius A*, at the center of the Milky Way.
- Chandra confirmed that X-rays in O-type stars are generated through plasma shocks embedded in their wind.
- Chandra found much more cool gas than expected spiraling into the center of the Andromeda Galaxy.
- Pressure fronts were observed in detail for the first time in Abell 2142, where clusters of galaxies are merging.
- The earliest images in X-rays of the shock wave of a supernova were taken of SN 1987A.
- Chandra showed for the first time the shadow of a small galaxy as it is being cannibalized by a larger one, in an image of Perseus A.
- A new type of black hole was discovered in galaxy M82, mid-mass objects purported to be the missing link between stellar-sized black holes and super massive black holes.
- X-ray emission lines were associated for the first time with a gamma-ray burst, Beethoven Burst GRB 991216.
- High school students, using Chandra data, discovered a neutron star in supernova remnant IC 443.
- Observations by Chandra and BeppoSAX suggest that gamma-ray bursts occur in star-forming regions.
- Chandra data suggested that RX J1856.5-3754 and 3C58, previously thought to be pulsars, might be even denser objects: quark stars. These results are still debated.
- Sound waves from violent activity around a super massive black hole were observed in the Perseus Cluster (2003).
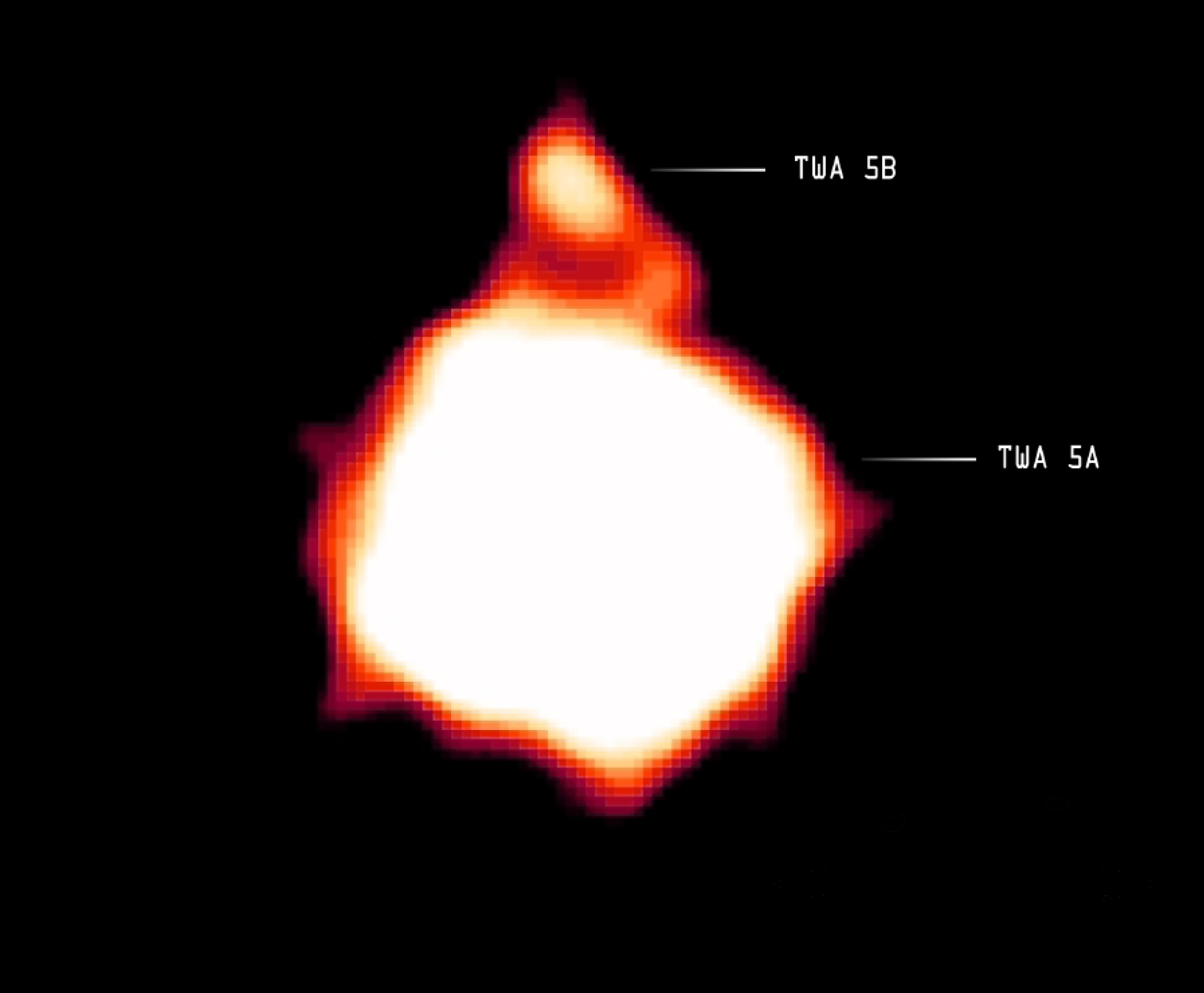
- CXO image of the brown dwarf TWA 5B
  TWA 5B, a brown dwarf, was seen orbiting a binary system of Sun-like stars.
- Nearly all stars on the main sequence are X-ray emitters.
- The X-ray shadow of Titan was seen when it transited the Crab Nebula.
- X-ray emissions from materials falling from a protoplanetary disc into a star.
- Hubble constant measured to be 76.9 km/s/Mpc using Sunyaev-Zel'dovich effect.
- In 2006, Chandra found strong evidence that dark matter exists by observing super cluster collision.
- Also in 2006, X-ray emitting loops, rings and filaments discovered around a super massive black hole within Messier 87 imply the presence of pressure waves, shock waves and sound waves. The evolution of Messier 87 may have been dramatically affected.
- Observations of the Bullet Cluster put limits on the cross-section of the self-interaction of dark matter.
- "The Hand of God" photograph of PSR B1509-58.
- Jupiter's X-Rays were observed coming from the poles, and not the auroral ring.
- A large halo of hot gas was found surrounding the Milky Way.
- The extremely dense and luminous ultracompact dwarf galaxy, M60-UCD1, was observed.
- On January 5, 2015, NASA reported that CXO observed an X-ray flare 400 times brighter than usual, a record-breaker, from Sagittarius A*, the supermassive black hole in the center of the Milky Way galaxy. The unusual event may have been caused by the breaking apart of an asteroid falling into the black hole or by the entanglement of magnetic field lines within gas flowing into Sagittarius A*, according to astronomers.
- In September 2016, it was announced that Chandra had detected X-ray emissions from Pluto, the first detection of X-rays from a Kuiper belt object. Chandra had made the observations in 2014 and 2015, supporting the New Horizons spacecraft for its July 2015 encounter.
- In September 2020, Chandra reportedly may have made an observation of an exoplanet in the Whirlpool Galaxy, which would be the first planet discovered beyond the Milky Way.
- In April 2021, NASA announced findings from the observatory in a tweet saying "Uranus gives off X-rays, astronomers find". The discovery would have "intriguing implications for understanding Uranus" if it is confirmed that the X-rays originate from the planet and are not emitted by the Sun.

== Technical description ==
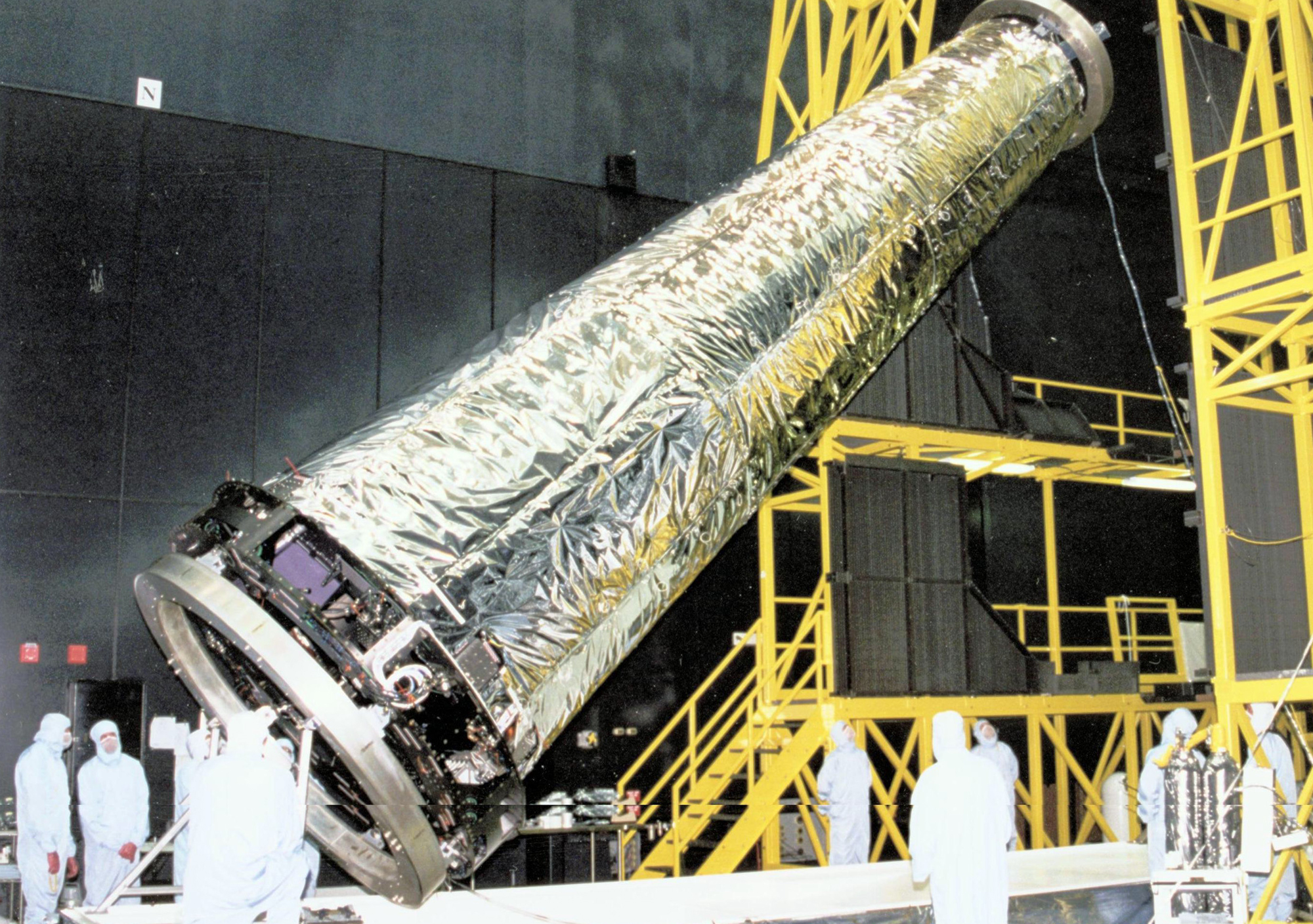
Assembly of the telescope

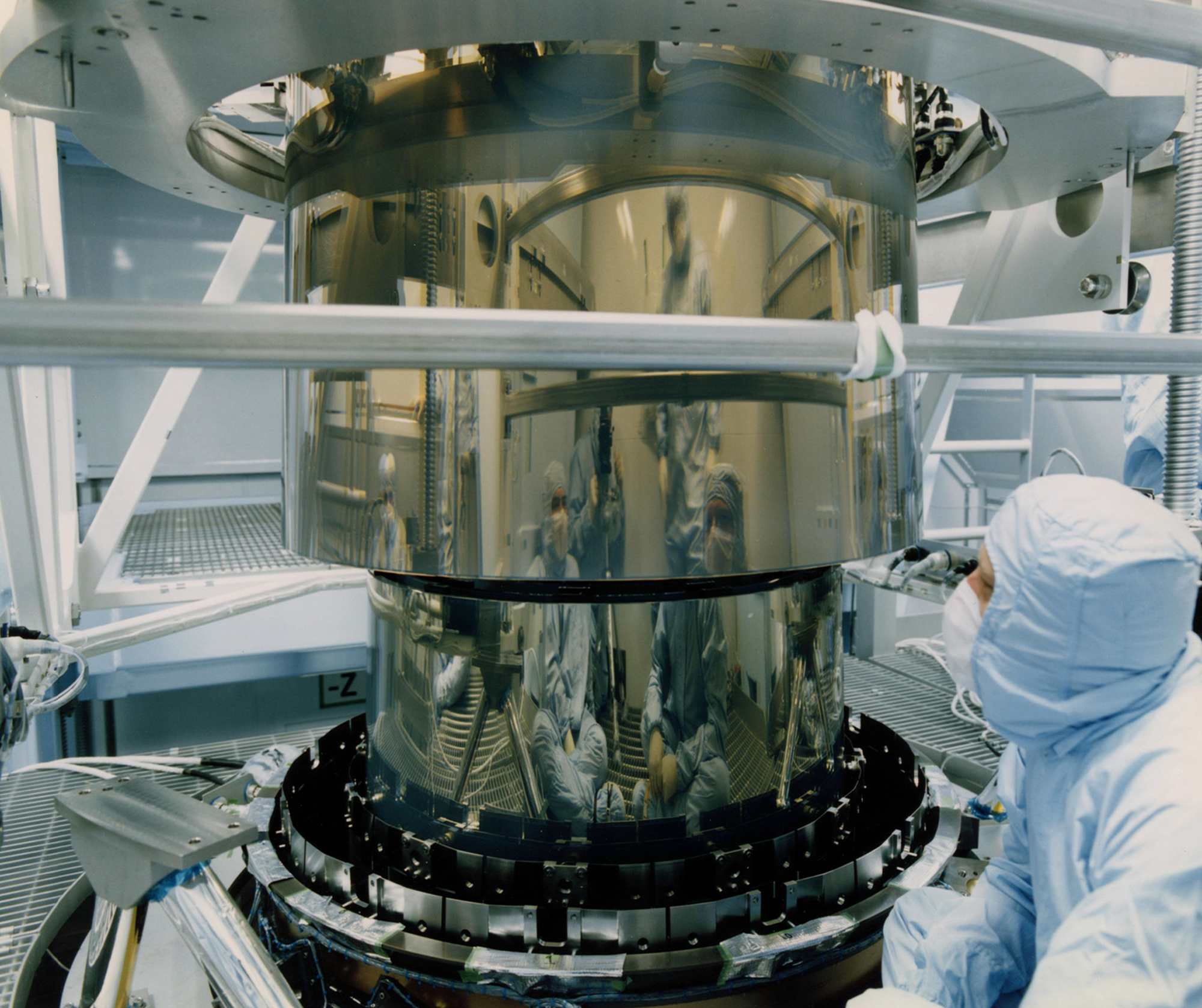
The main mirror of AXAF (Chandra)

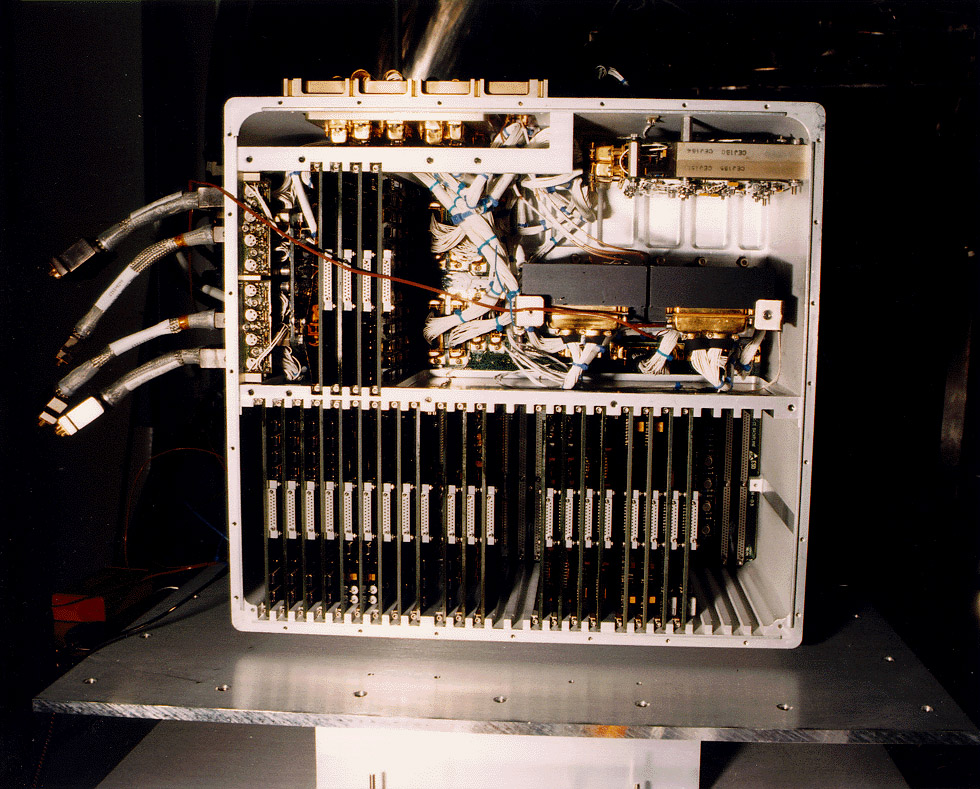
HRC flight unit of Chandra

Unlike optical telescopes which possess simple aluminized parabolic surfaces (mirrors), X-ray telescopes generally use a Wolter telescope consisting of nested cylindrical paraboloid and hyperboloid surfaces coated with iridium or gold. X-ray photons would be absorbed by normal mirror surfaces, so mirrors with a low grazing angle are necessary to reflect them. Chandra uses four pairs of nested mirrors, together with their support structure, called the High Resolution Mirror Assembly (HRMA); the mirror substrate is 2 cm-thick glass, with the reflecting surface a 33 nm iridium coating, and the diameters are 65 cm, 87 cm, 99 cm and 123 cm. The thick substrate and particularly careful polishing allowed a very precise optical surface, which is responsible for Chandra's unmatched resolution: between 80% and 95% of the incoming X-ray energy is focused into a one-arcsecond circle. However, the thickness of the substrate limits the proportion of the aperture which is filled, leading to the low collecting area compared to XMM-Newton.

Chandra's highly elliptical orbit allows it to observe continuously for up to 55 hours of its 64-hour orbital period. At its furthest orbital point from Earth, Chandra is one of the most distant Earth-orbiting satellites. This orbit takes it beyond the geostationary satellites and beyond the outer Van Allen belt.

With an angular resolution of 0.5 arcsecond (2.4 μrad), Chandra possesses a resolution over 1000 times better than that of the first orbiting X-ray telescope.

CXO uses mechanical gyroscopes, which are sensors that help determine what direction the telescope is pointed. Other navigation and orientation systems on board CXO include an aspect camera, Earth and Sun sensors, and reaction wheels. It also has two sets of thrusters, one for movement and another for offloading momentum.

== Instruments ==
The Science Instrument Module (SIM) holds the two focal plane instruments, the Advanced CCD Imaging Spectrometer (ACIS) and the High Resolution Camera (HRC), moving whichever is called for into position during an observation.

ACIS consists of 10 CCD chips and provides images as well as spectral information of the object observed. It operates in the photon energy range of 0.2–10 keV. The HRC has two micro-channel plate components and images over the range of 0.1–10 keV. It also has a time resolution of 16 microseconds. Both of these instruments can be used on their own or in conjunction with one of the observatory's two transmission gratings.

The transmission gratings, which swing into the optical path behind the mirrors, provide Chandra with high resolution spectroscopy. The High Energy Transmission Grating Spectrometer (HETGS) works over 0.4–10 keV and has a spectral resolution of 60–1000. The Low Energy Transmission Grating Spectrometer (LETGS) has a range of 0.09–3 keV and a resolution of 40–2000.

Summary:

- High Resolution Camera (HRC)
- Advanced CCD Imaging Spectrometer (ACIS)
- High Energy Transmission Grating Spectrometer (HETGS)
- Low Energy Transmission Grating Spectrometer (LETGS)

== Gallery ==
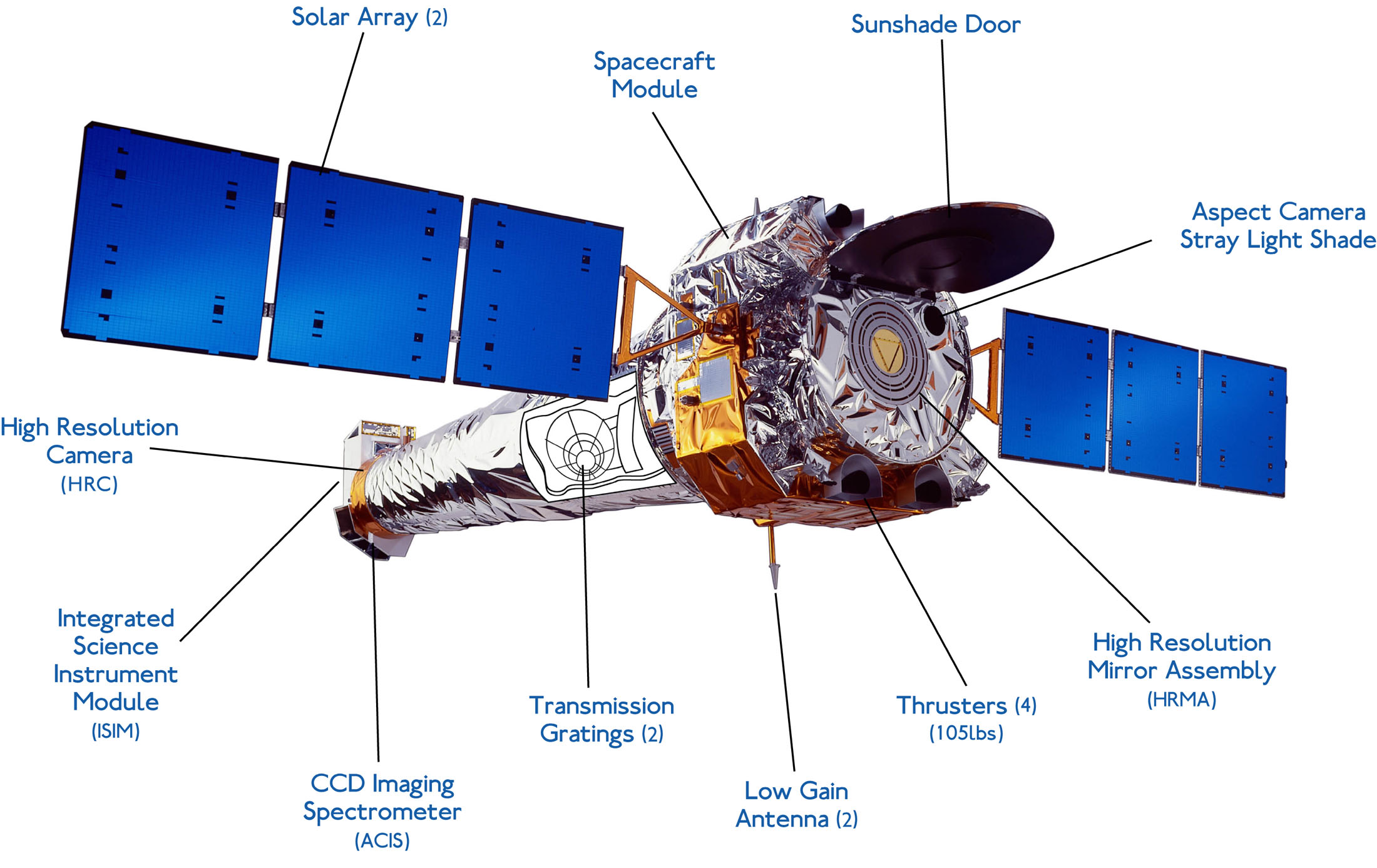
Labeled diagram of CXO

Animation of Chandra X-ray Observatory's orbit around Earth from August 7, 1999 Chandra · Earth

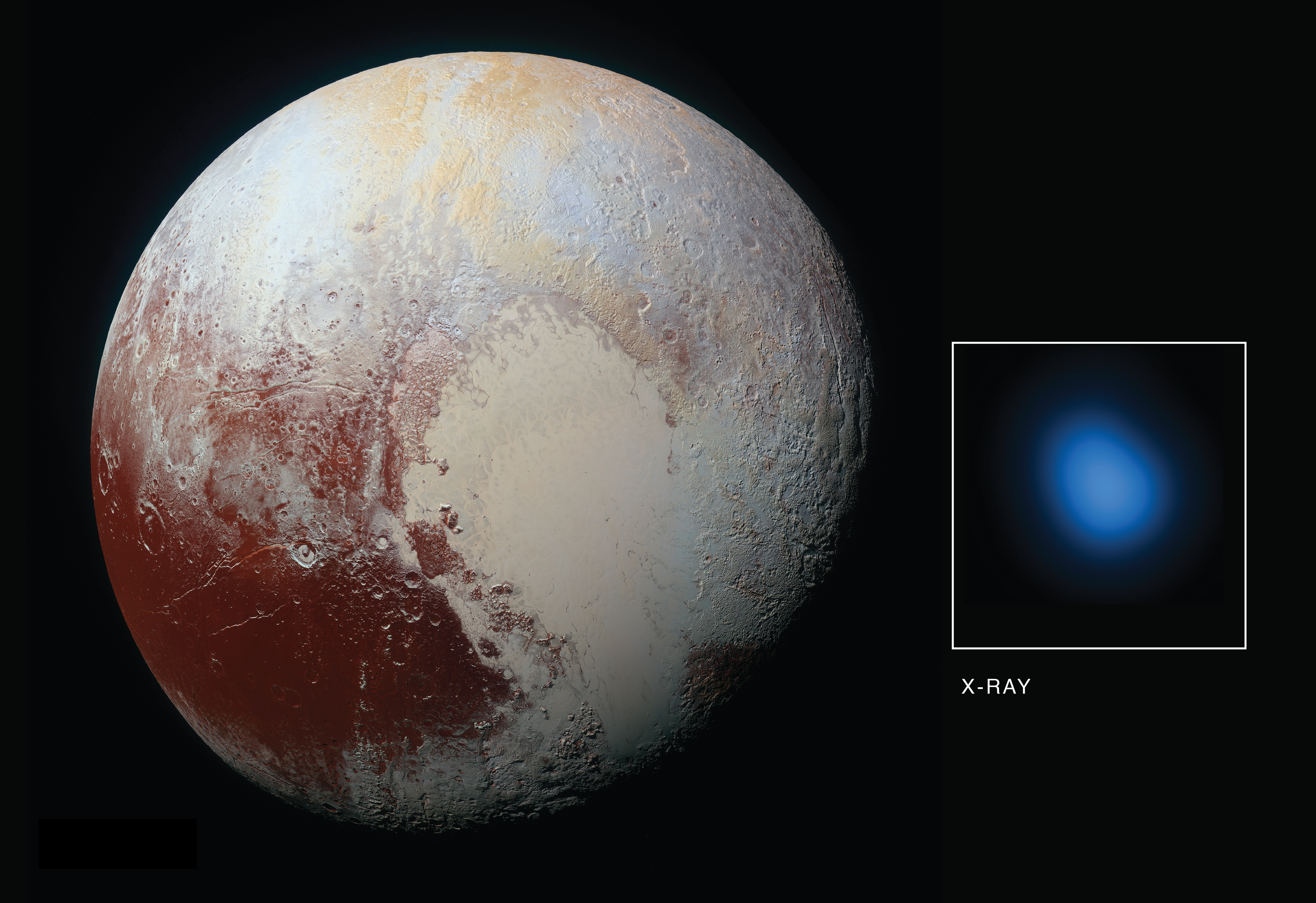
X-Rays of Pluto

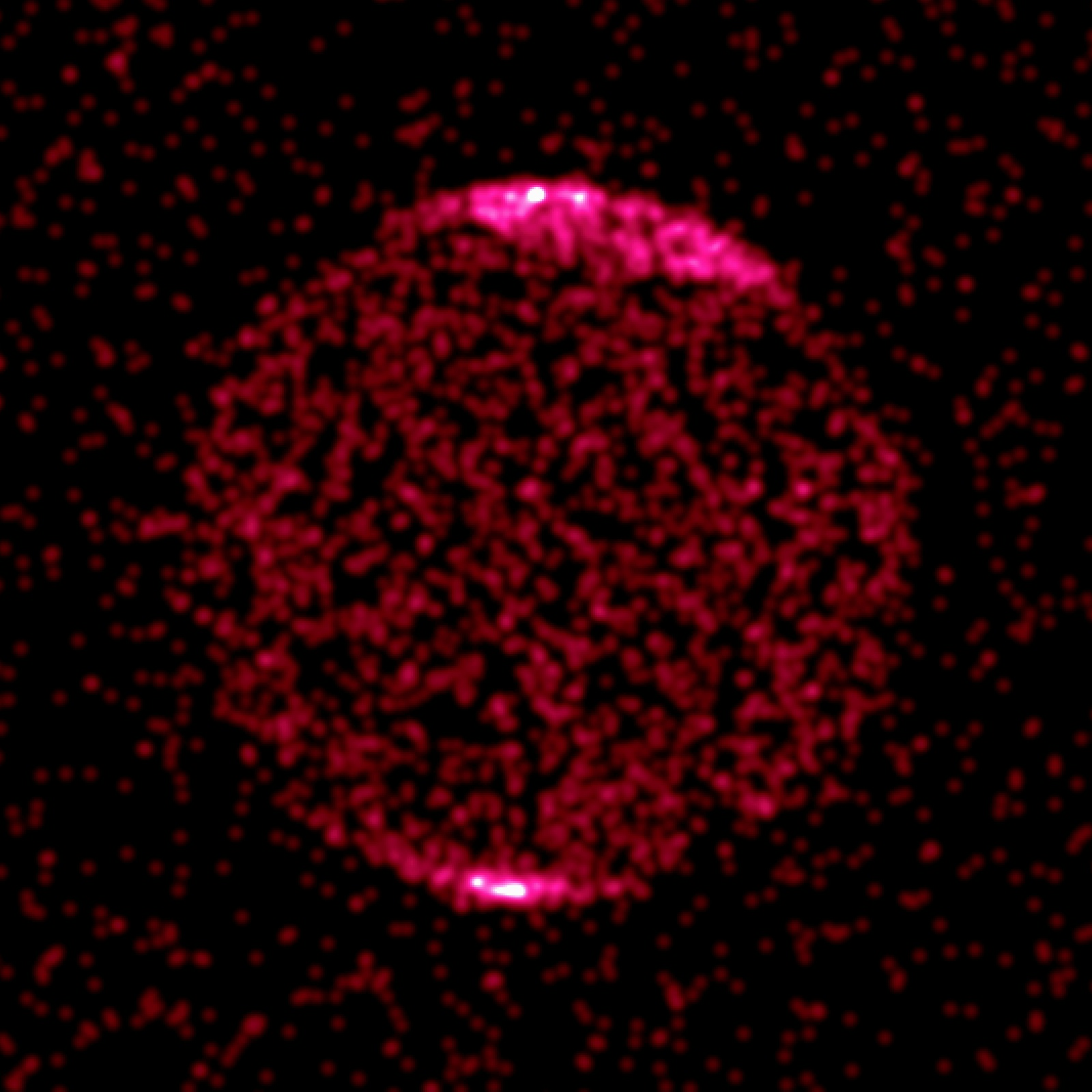
Jupiter in X-ray light

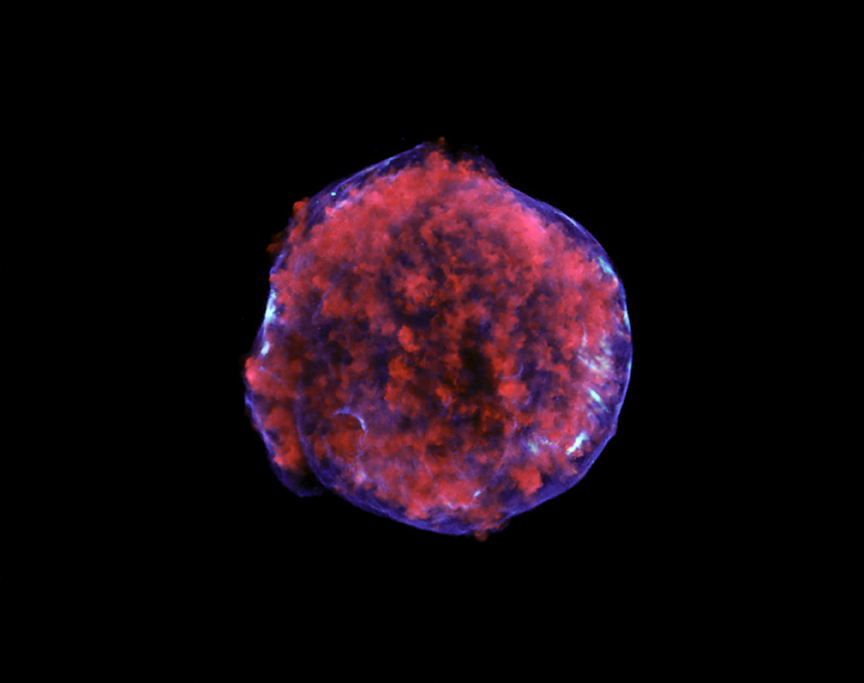
Tycho Supernova remnant in X-ray light

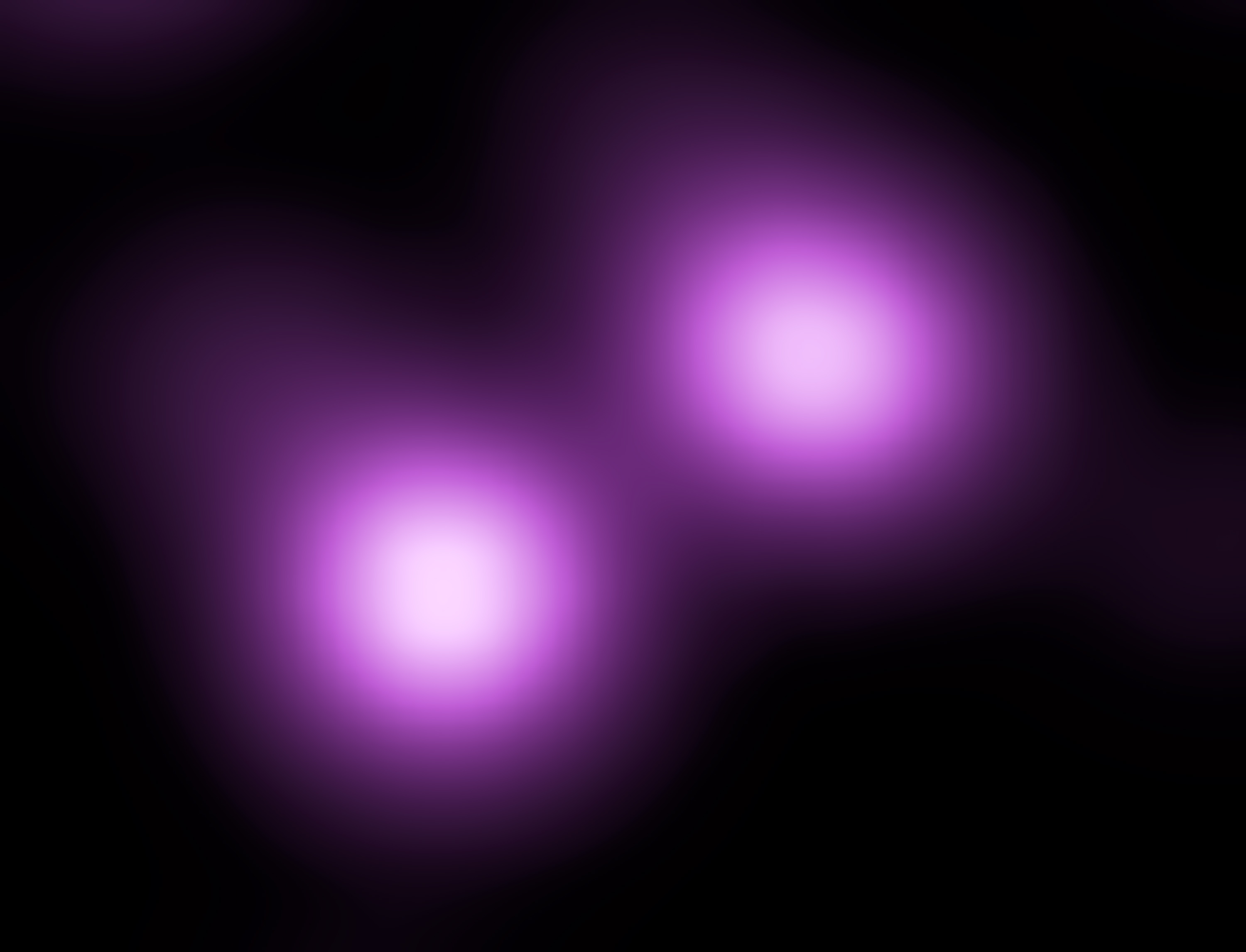
SN 2006gy (upper right) and parent galaxy NGC 1260

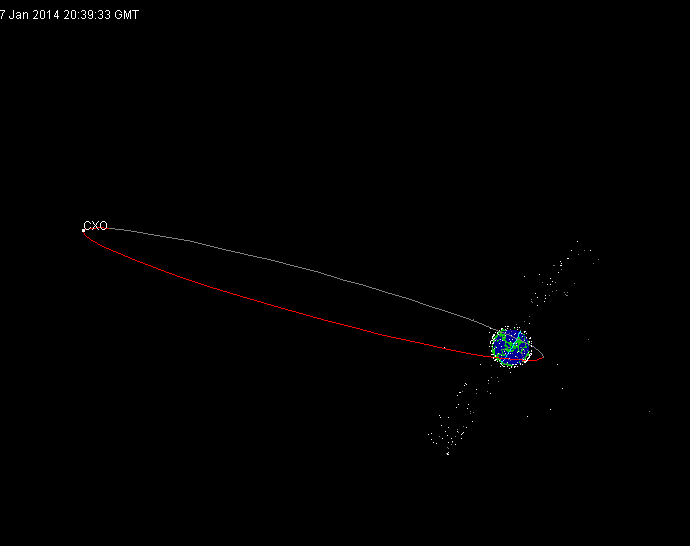
CXO orbit as of January 7, 2014

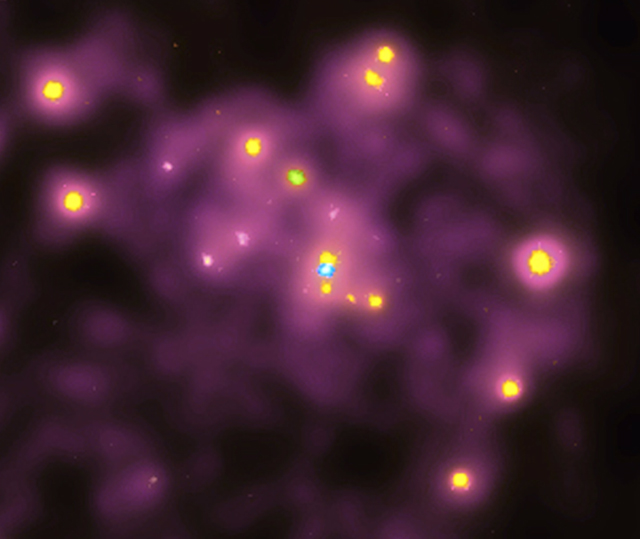
M31 Core in X-ray light

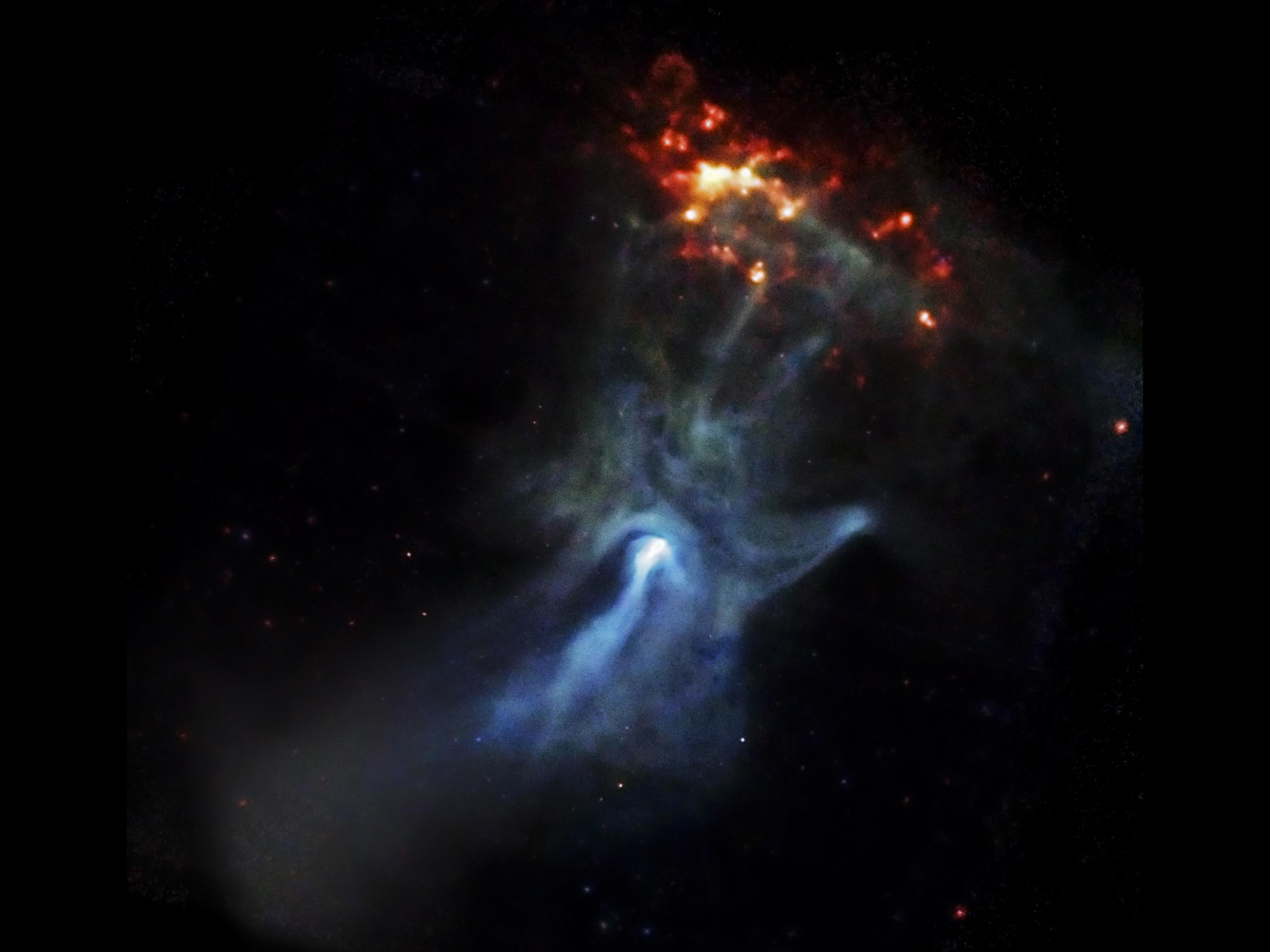
PSR B1509-58 – red, green and blue/max energy

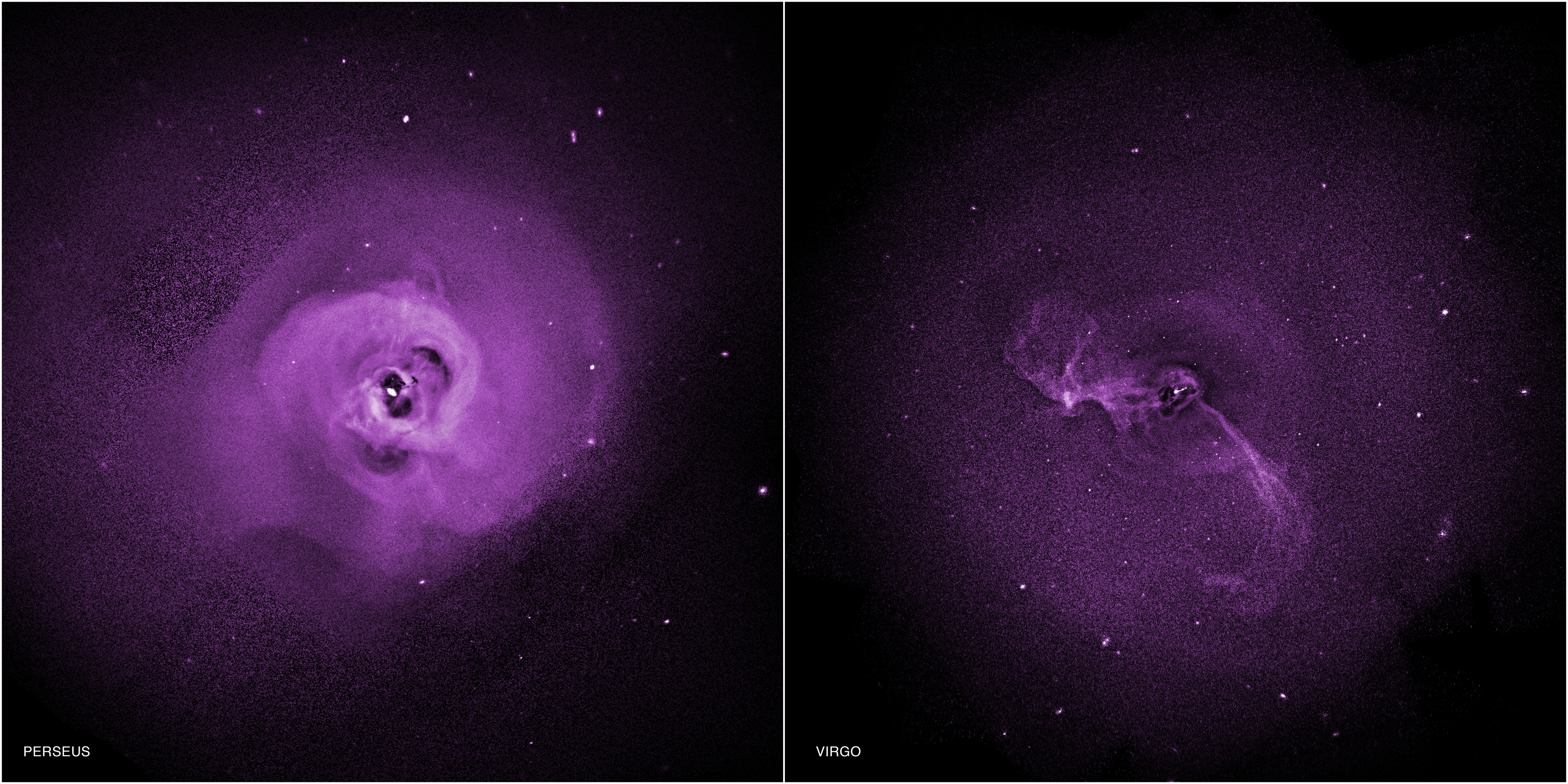
Turbulence may prevent galaxy clusters from cooling.

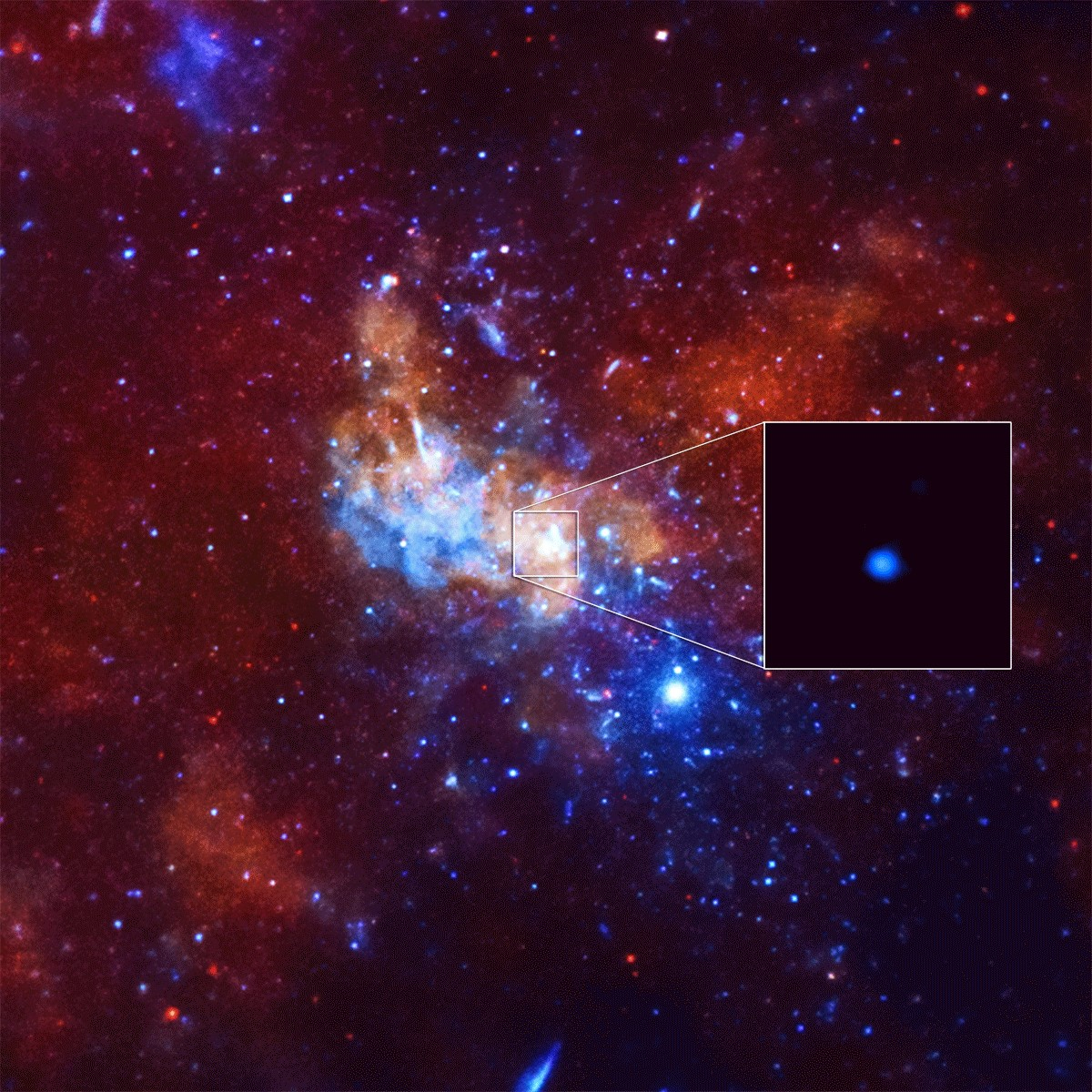
Bright X-ray flare from Sagittarius A*, supermassive black hole in the Milky Way

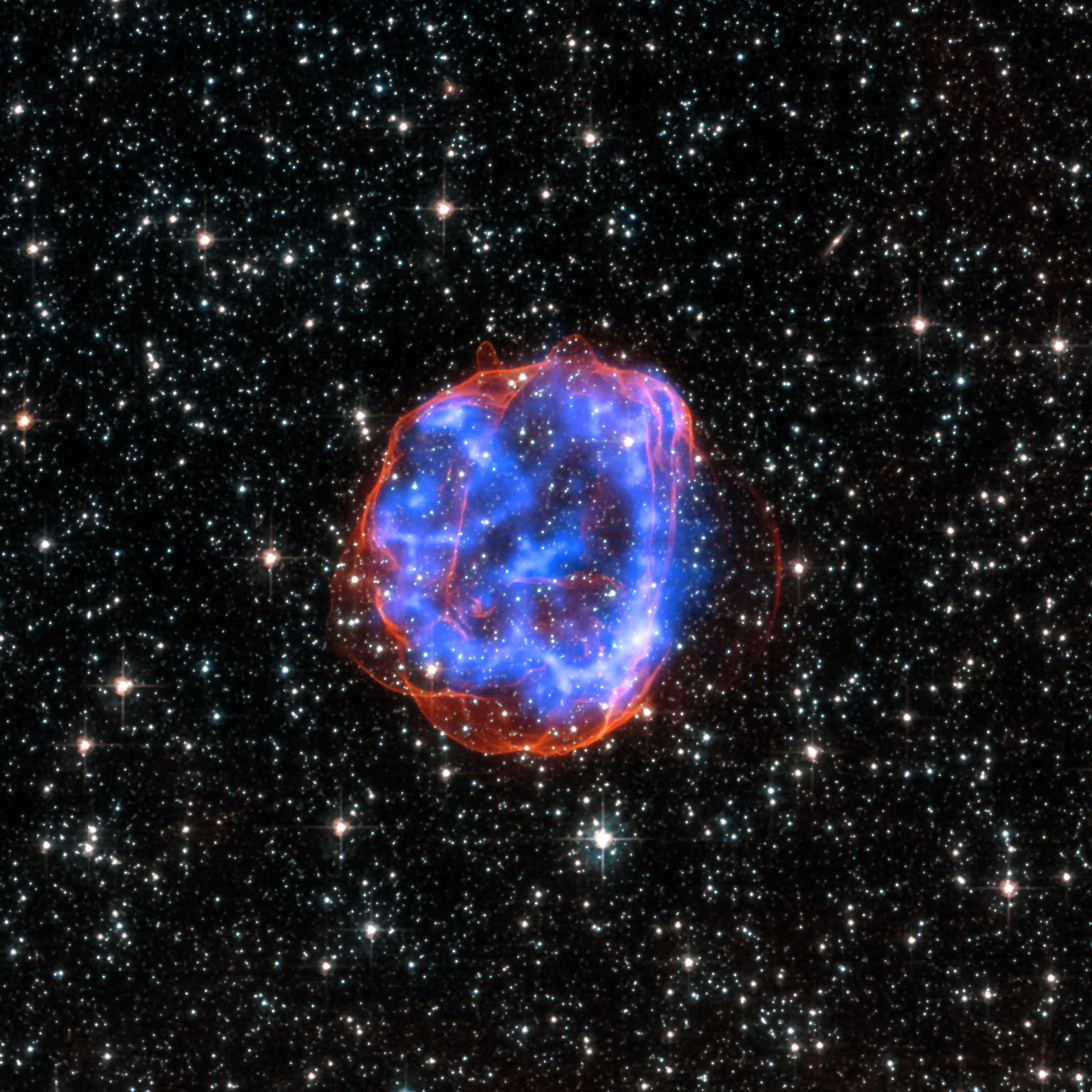
SNR 0519–69.0 – remains of an exploding star in the Large Magellanic Cloud

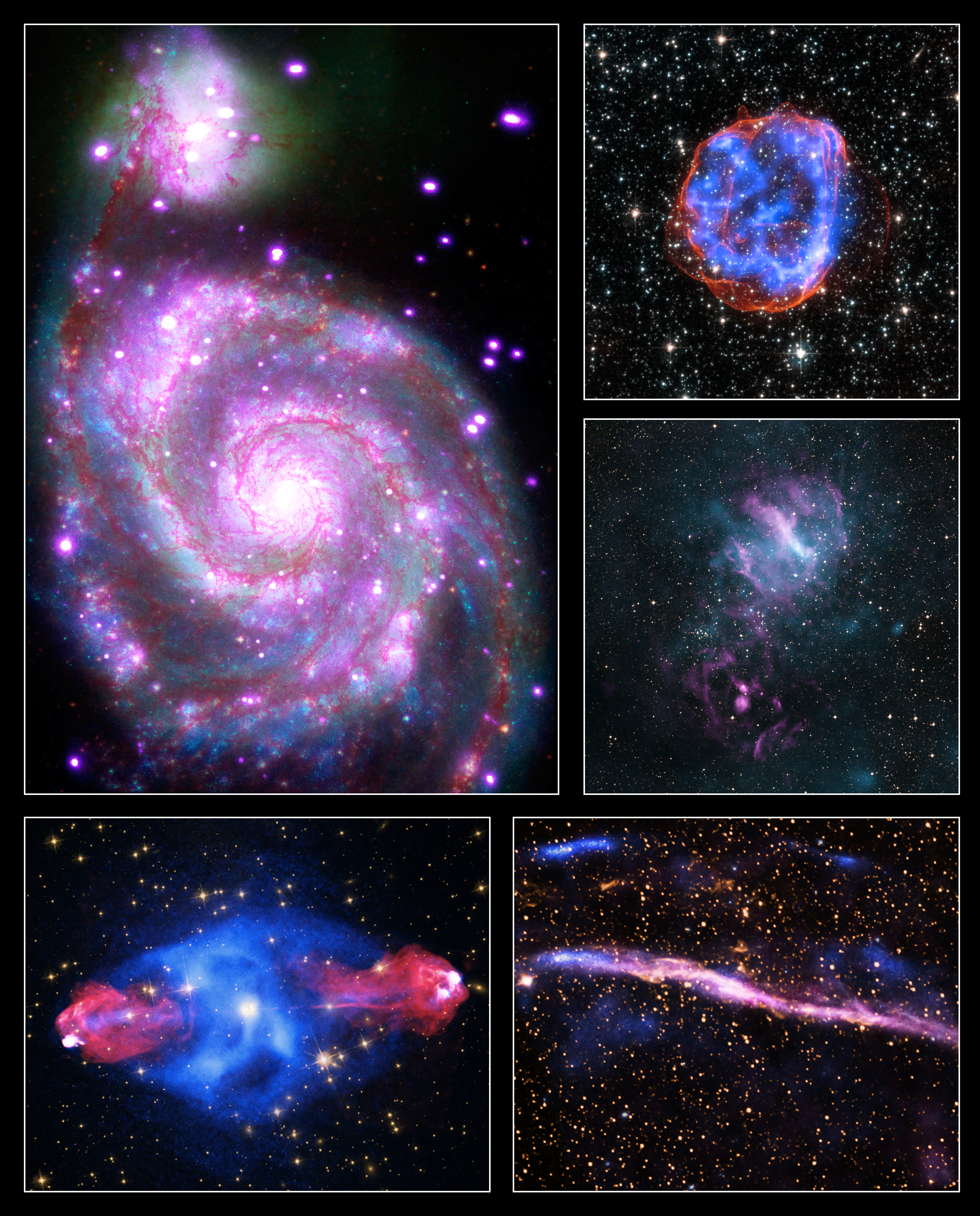
Images released to celebrate the International Year of Light 2015

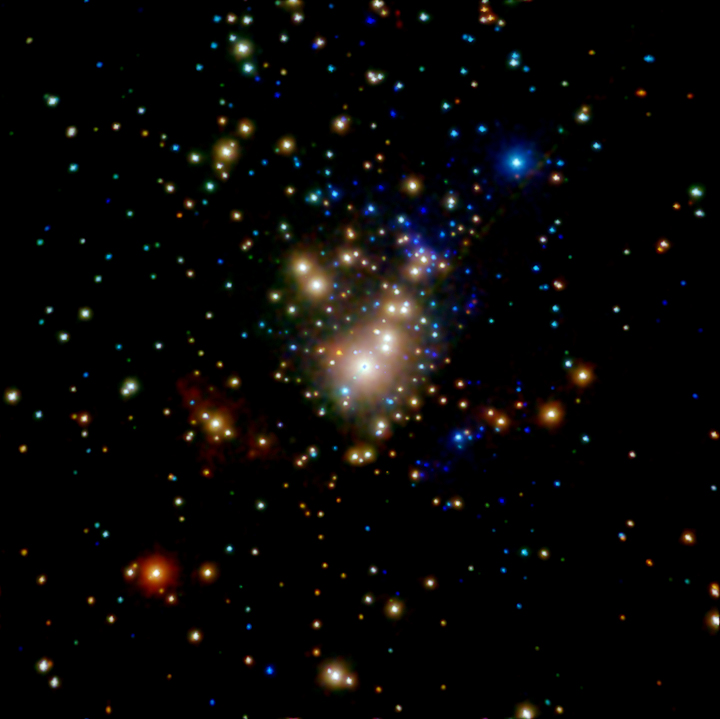
Cluster of newly formed stars in Orion Nebula

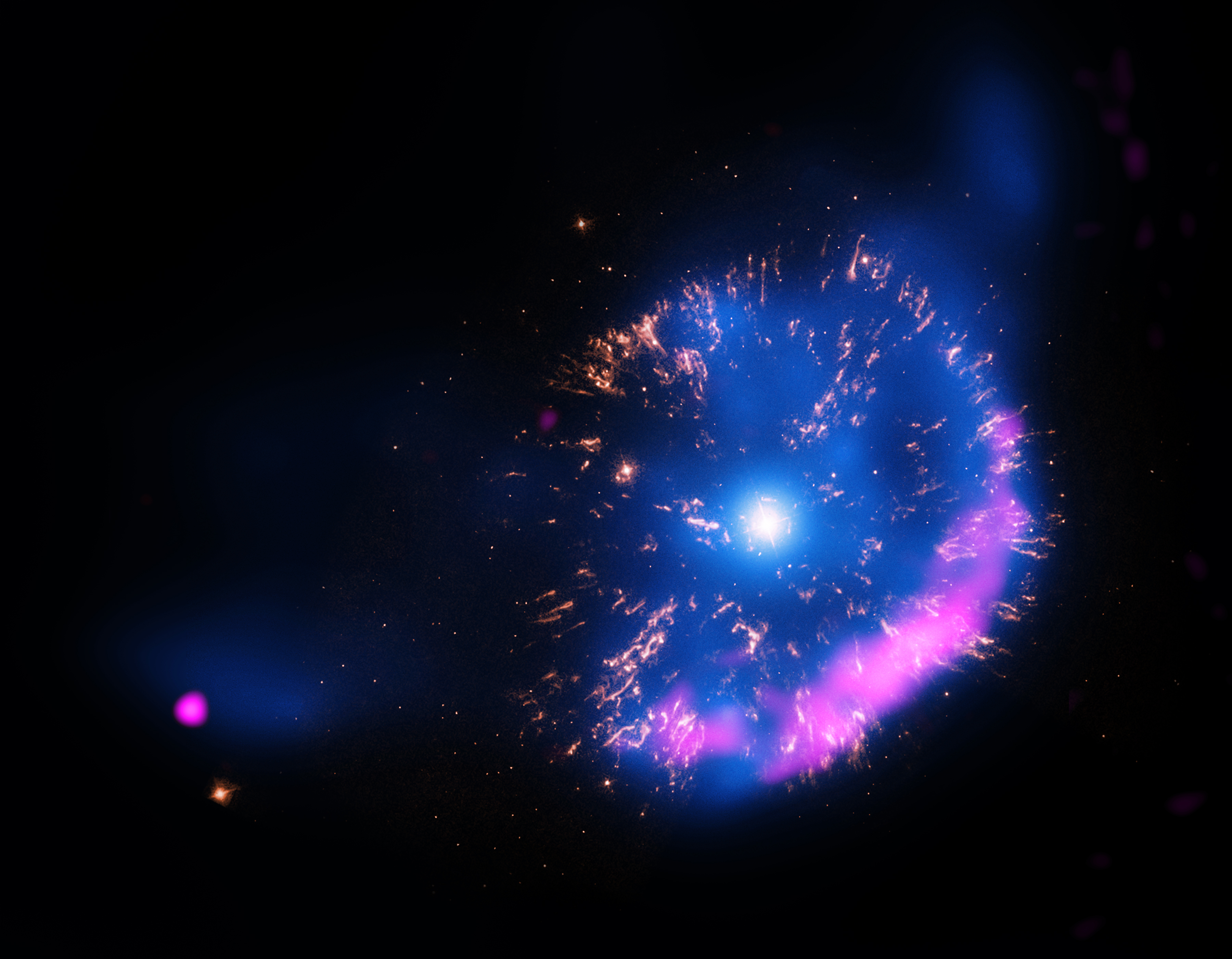
GK Persei: Nova of 1901

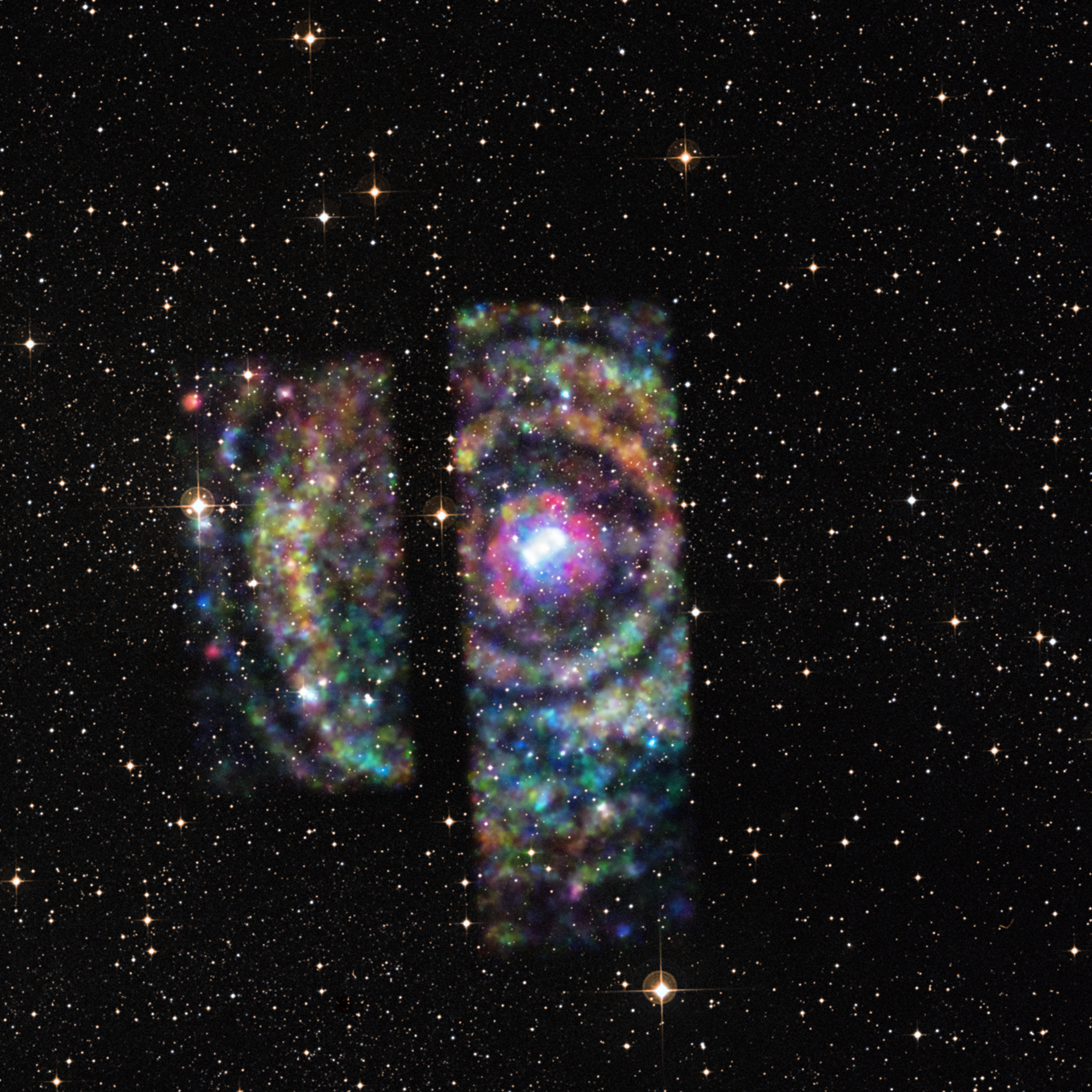
X-ray light rings from a neutron star in Circinus X-1

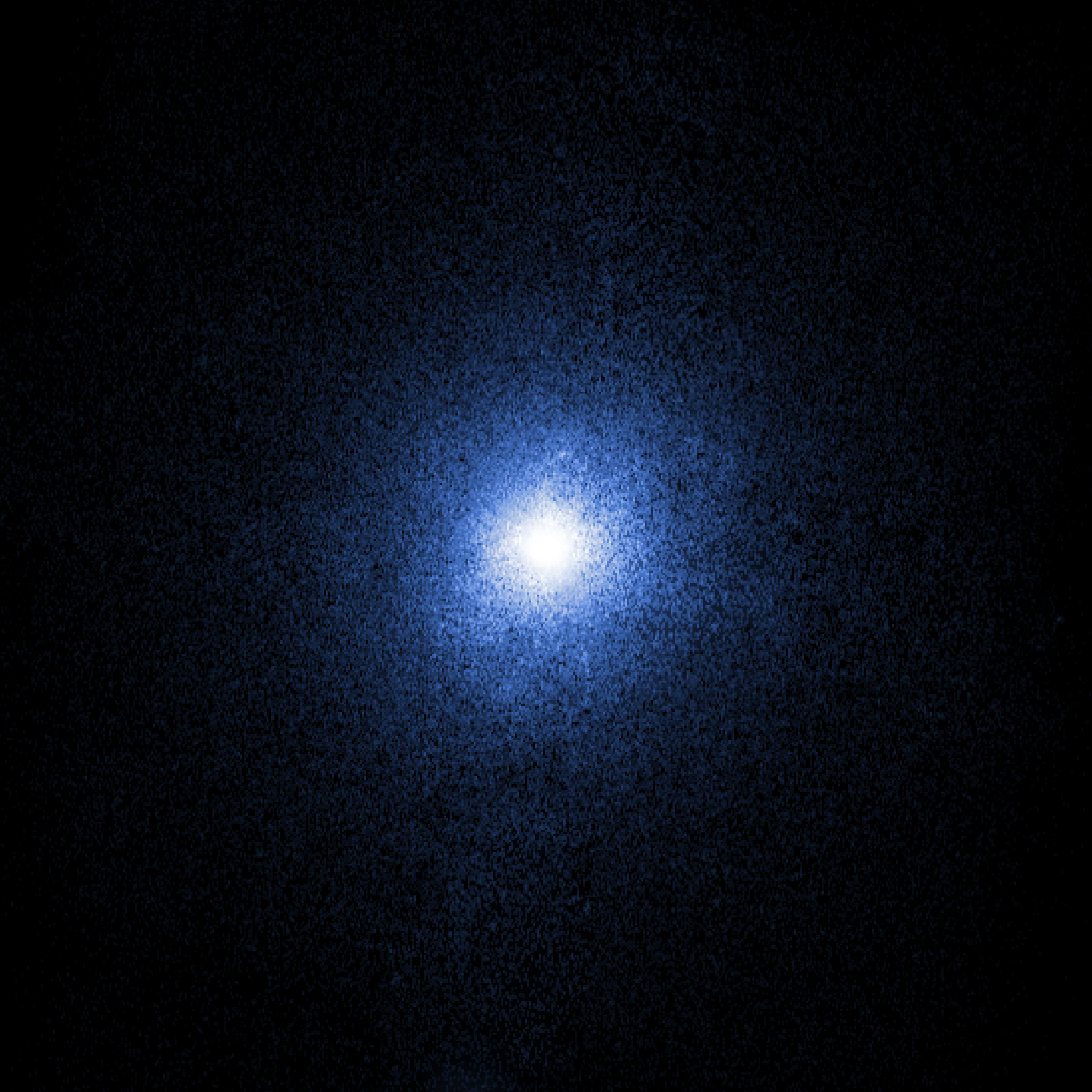
Cygnus X-1, the first strong black hole discovered

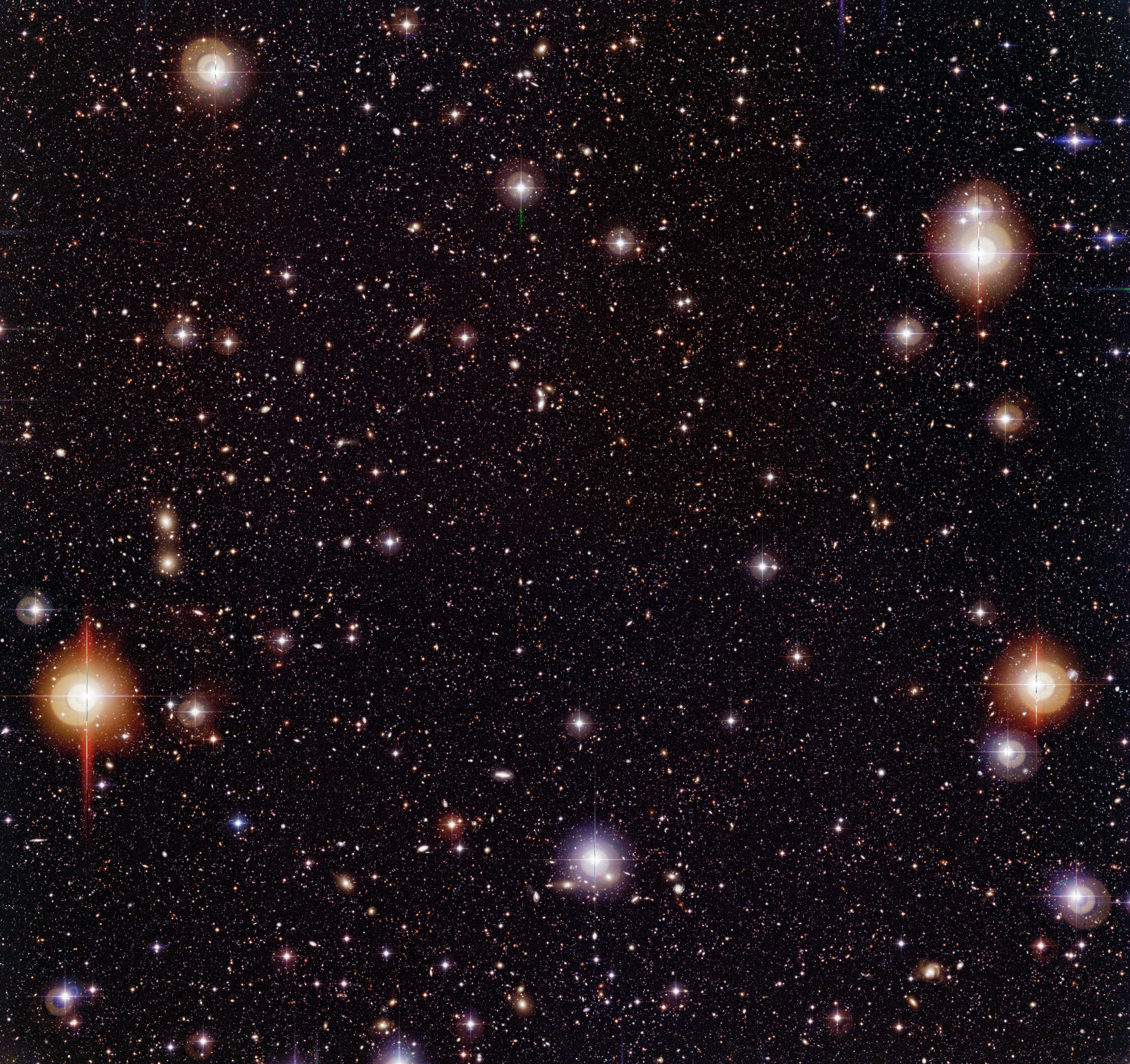
Image of the Chandra Deep Field South estimated by Kimberly Arcand as showing 5000 black holes

== See also ==
- AGILE (satellite), an Italian orbital X-ray telescope
- Great Observatories program
- List of deep fields
- List of space telescopes
- List of X-ray space telescopes
- Lynx X-ray Observatory, possible successor
- NuSTAR
- Suzaku, a sister satellite originating from AXAF-S (spectrometer)
- X-ray astronomy
