= Advanced CCD Imaging Spectrometer =

Instrument installed on CXO

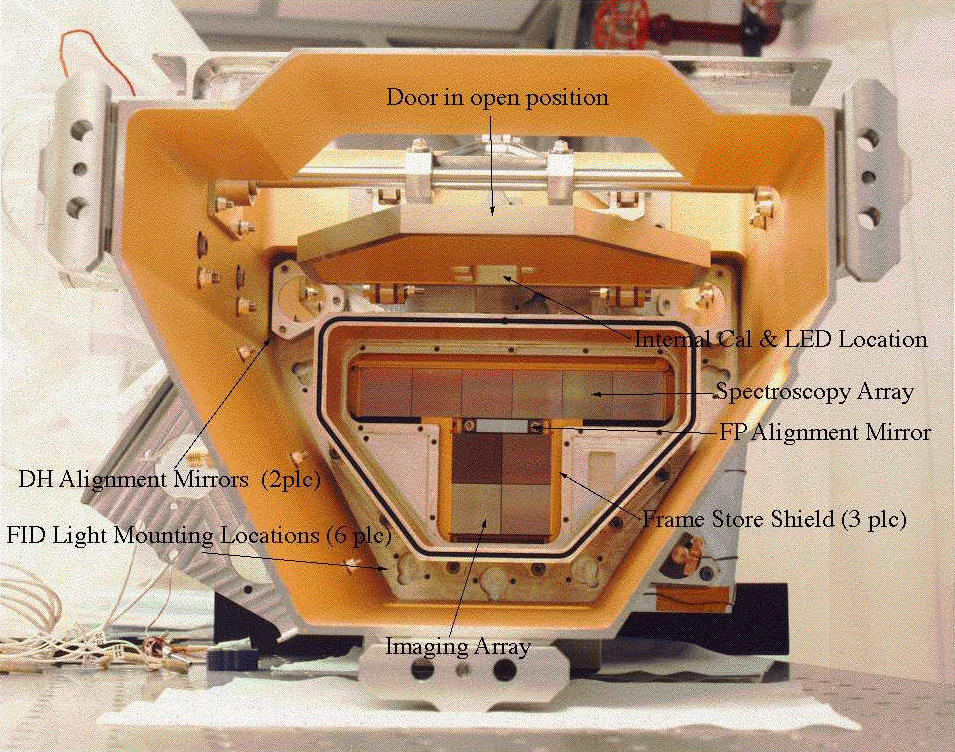
Advanced CCD Imaging Spectrometer

The Advanced CCD Imaging Spectrometer (ACIS), formerly the AXAF CCD Imaging Spectrometer, is an instrument built by a team from the Massachusetts Institute of Technology's Center for Space Research and the Pennsylvania State University for the Chandra X-ray Observatory.

ACIS is a focal plane instrument that uses an array of charge-coupled devices. It serves as an X-ray integral field spectrograph for Chandra. The instrument is capable of measuring both the position and energy of incoming X-rays.

The CCD sensors of ACIS operate at −120 °C (−184 °F) and its filters at −60 and −50 °C (−76 and −58 °F). It carries a special heater that allows contamination from Chandra to be baked off; the spacecraft contains lubricants, and the ACIS design took this into account in order to clean its sensors. Contamination buildup can reduce the instrument's sensitivity. Radiation in space is another potential danger to the sensor.

As of 2014, after 15 years of operation, there was no indication of a limit to the lifetime of ACIS. Another design feature of the instrument was a calibration source that can be used to understand its health. This allows for a measurement of the level of contamination, if present, as well as any degree of charge transfer inefficiency.
