= IC 443 =

Supernova remnant in the constellation Gemini

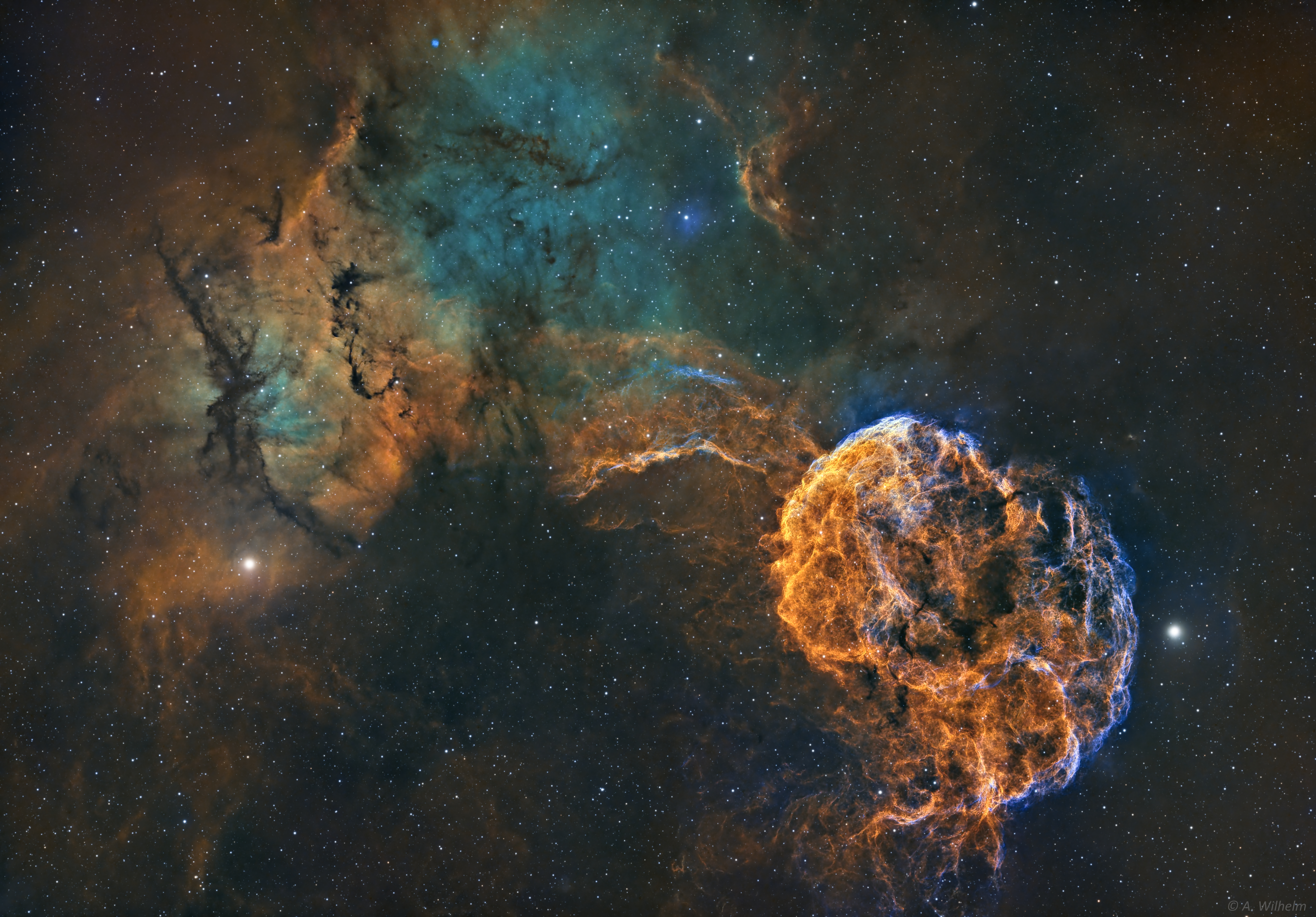
- Full image
- Event type: Supernova remnant
- Type II (?)
- Constellation: Gemini
- Right ascension: 06^{h} 17^{m} 13^{s}
- Declination: +22° 31′ 05″
- Epoch: J2000
- Galactic coordinates: G189.1+3.0
- Distance: 5,000 ly
- Notable features: 45′; mixed morphology; interaction with molecular clouds
- Related media on Commons

IC 443 (also known as the Jellyfish Nebula and Sharpless 248 (Sh 2-248)) is a galactic supernova remnant (SNR) in the constellation Gemini. On the plane of the sky, it is located near the star Eta Geminorum. Its distance is roughly 5,000 light years from Earth.

IC 443 may be the remains of a supernova that occurred 30,000 - 35,000 years ago. The same supernova event likely created the neutron star CXOU J061705.3+222127, the collapsed remnant of the stellar core. IC 443 is one of the best-studied cases of supernova remnants interacting with surrounding molecular clouds.

== Global properties ==
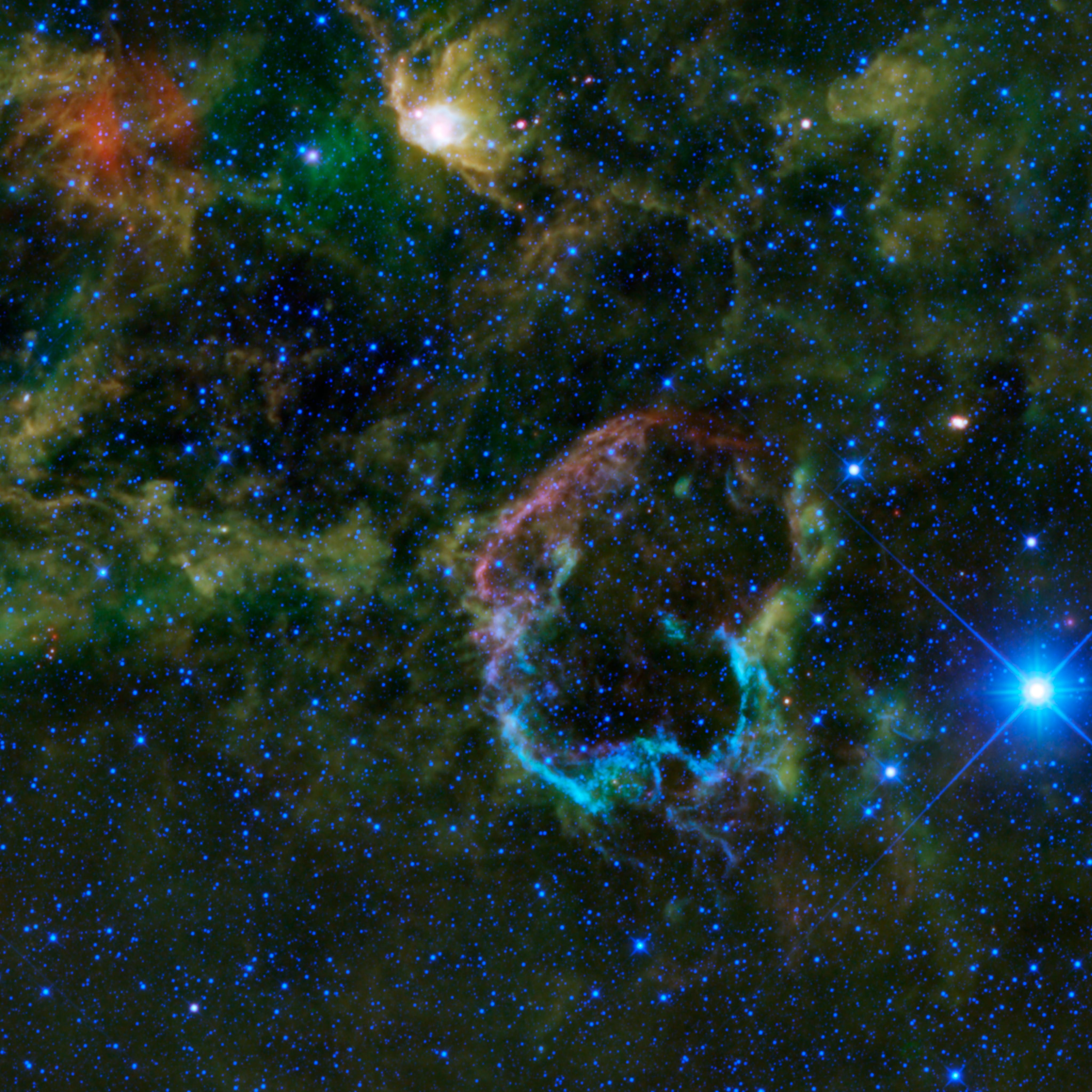
WISE image of IC 443

IC 443 is an extended source, having an angular diameter of 50 arcmin (by comparison, the full moon is 30 arcmin across). At the estimated distance of 5,000 ly (1,500 parsec) from Earth, it corresponds to a physical size of roughly 70 light years (20 parsec).

The SNR optical and radio morphology is shell-like (e.g. a prototypical shell-like SNR is SN 1006), consisting of two connected sub-shells with different centers and radii. A third, larger sub-shell—initially attributed to IC 443—is now recognized as a different and older (100,000 years) SNR, called G189.6+3.3.
Notably, IC 443 X-ray morphology is centrally peaked and a very soft X-ray shell is barely visible. Unlike plerion remnants, e.g. the Crab Nebula, the inner X-ray emission is not dominated by the central pulsar wind nebula. It has indeed a thermal origin. IC 443 shows very similar features to the class of mixed morphology SNRs. Both optical and X-ray emission are heavily absorbed by a giant molecular cloud in the foreground, crossing the whole remnant body from northwest to southeast.

The remnant's age is still uncertain. There is some agreement that the progenitor supernova happened between 3,000 and 30,000 years ago. Recent Chandra and XMM-Newton observations identified a plerion nebula, close to the remnant southern rim. The point source near the apex of the nebula is a neutron star, relic of a SN explosion. The location in a star forming region and the presence of a neutron star favor a Type II supernova, the ultimate fate of a massive star, as the progenitor explosion.

=== The SNR environment ===
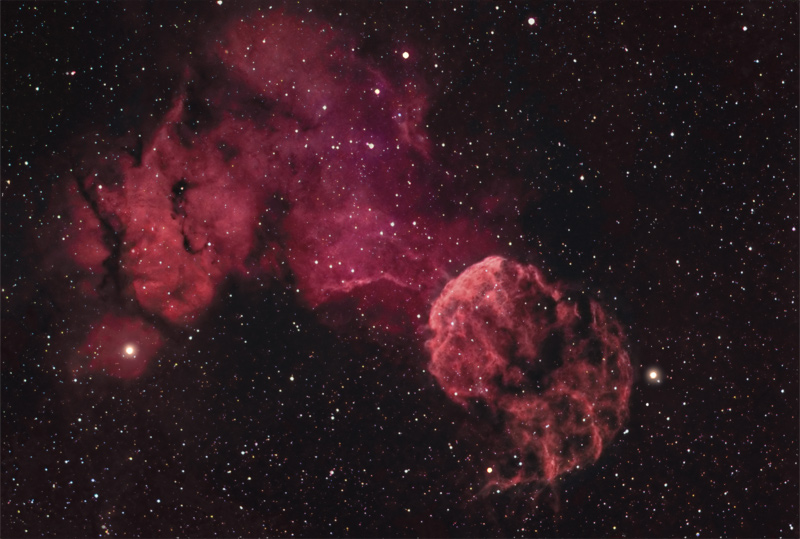
IC 443 wide field image. The stars η (right) and μ (left) Geminorum, the diffuse emission from S249 (north), and the G189.6+3.3 partial shell (center) are visible.

The SNR IC 443 is located in the galactic anticenter direction (l=189.1°), close to the galactic plane (b=+3.0°). Many objects lie in the same region of sky: the HII region S249, several young stars (members of the GEM OB1 association), and an older SNR (G189.6+3.3).

The remnant is evolving in a rich and complex environment, which strongly affects its morphology. Multi-wavelength observations show the presence of sharp density gradients and different cloud geometries in the surroundings of IC 443. Massive stars are known to be short lived (roughly 30 million years), ending their life when they are still embedded within the progenitor cloud. The more massive stars (O-type) probably clear the circum-stellar environment by powerful stellar winds or photoionizing radiation. Early B-type stars, with a typical mass between 8 and 12 solar masses, are not capable of this, and they likely interact with the primordial molecular cloud when they explode. Thus, it is not surprising that the SNR IC 443, which is thought to be the aftermath of a stellar explosion, evolved in such a complex environment. For instance, an appreciable fraction of supernova remnants lies close to dense molecular clouds (~50 out of 265 in the Green catalogue), and most of them (~60%) show clear signs of interaction with the adjacent cloud.

X-ray and the optical images are characterized by a dark lane, crossing IC 443 from northwest to southeast. Emission from quiescent molecular gas has been observed toward the same direction, and it is likely due to a giant molecular cloud, located between the remnant and the observer. This is the main source of extinction of the low energy SNR emission.

In the southeast the blast wave is interacting with a very dense (~10,000 cm^{−3}) and clumpy molecular cloud, such that the emitting shocked gas has a ring-like shape. The blast wave has been strongly decelerated by the cloud and is moving with an estimated velocity of roughly 30–40 km s^{−1}. OH (1720 MHz) maser emission, which is a robust tracer of interaction between SNRs and dense molecular clouds, has been detected in this region. A source of gamma-ray radiation is spatially coincident with IC 443 and most likely originates from interactions of the SNR with the molecular clouds which can be concluded from the detection of the pion bump, a characteristic spectral feature of hadronic gamma-ray production.

In the northeast, where the brightest optical filaments are located, the SNR is interacting with a very different environment. The forward shock has encountered a wall of neutral hydrogen (HI), and is propagating into a less dense medium (~10-1,000 cm^{−3}) with a much higher velocity (80–100 km s^{−1}) than in the southern ridge.

In the western region, the shock wave breaks out into a more homogeneous and rarefied medium.

== See also ==
- Gemini (Chinese astronomy)
- List of stars in Gemini
