= CXOU J061705.3+222127 =

Neutron star in the constellation Gemini

Observation data Epoch J2000.0 Equinox J2000.0 (ICRS)
- Constellation: Gemini
- Right ascension: 06^{h} 17^{m} 05.26^{s}
- Declination: +22° 21′ 29.4″
| Spectral type | Neutron star |

Database references
| SIMBAD | data |

CXOU J061705.3+222127 is a neutron star. It was likely formed 30,000 years ago in the supernova that created the supernova remnant IC 443, the "Jellyfish Nebula." It is travelling at approximately 230 km/s (830,000 km/h) away from the site.
