= Capricornus in Chinese astronomy =

According to traditional Chinese uranography, the modern constellation Capricornus is located within the northern quadrant of the sky, which is symbolized as the Black Tortoise of the North (北方玄武, Běi Fāng Xuán Wǔ)

The name of the western constellation in modern Chinese is 摩羯座 (mó jié zuò), meaning "the rub ram constellation".

== Stars ==
The map of Chinese constellation in constellation Capricornus area consists of:

Four Symbols	Mansion (Chinese name)	Romanization	Translation	Asterisms (Chinese name)	Romanization	Translation	Western star name	Proper Name	Chinese star name	Romanization	Translation
The Black Tortoise of the North (北方玄武)	牛	Niú	Ox	女	Niú	Ox					
The Black Tortoise of the North (北方玄武)	牛	Niú	Ox	女	Niú	Ox	β^{1} Cap	Dabih (for compenent Aa)			
The Black Tortoise of the North (北方玄武)	牛	Niú	Ox	女	Niú	Ox	β^{1} Cap	Dabih (for compenent Aa)	牛宿一	Niúsùyī	1st star
The Black Tortoise of the North (北方玄武)	牛	Niú	Ox	女	Niú	Ox	β^{1} Cap	Dabih (for compenent Aa)	牛宿距星	Niúsùjùxīng	Separated star
The Black Tortoise of the North (北方玄武)	牛	Niú	Ox	女	Niú	Ox	β^{1} Cap	Dabih (for compenent Aa)	牛宿中央大星	Niúsùdàzhōngyāngxīng	Big center star
The Black Tortoise of the North (北方玄武)	牛	Niú	Ox	女	Niú	Ox	β^{1} Cap	Dabih (for compenent Aa)	牛宿中大星	Niúsùdàzhōngxīng	Big center star
The Black Tortoise of the North (北方玄武)	牛	Niú	Ox	女	Niú	Ox	α^{2} Cap	Algedi	牛宿二	Niúsùèr	2nd star
The Black Tortoise of the North (北方玄武)	牛	Niú	Ox	女	Niú	Ox	ξ^{2} Cap		牛宿三	Niúsùsān	3rd star
The Black Tortoise of the North (北方玄武)	牛	Niú	Ox	女	Niú	Ox	π Cap		牛宿四	Niúsùsì	4th star
The Black Tortoise of the North (北方玄武)	牛	Niú	Ox	女	Niú	Ox	ο Cap		牛宿五	Niúsùwu	5th star
The Black Tortoise of the North (北方玄武)	牛	Niú	Ox	女	Niú	Ox	ρ Cap				
The Black Tortoise of the North (北方玄武)	牛	Niú	Ox	女	Niú	Ox	ρ Cap		牛宿六	Niúsùliù	6th star
The Black Tortoise of the North (北方玄武)	牛	Niú	Ox	女	Niú	Ox	ρ Cap		牛宿南星	Niúnánxīng	Southern star
The Black Tortoise of the North (北方玄武)	牛	Niú	Ox	女	Niú	Ox	ρ Cap		牛宿下左星	Niúsùxiàzuǒxīng	Left lower star
The Black Tortoise of the North (北方玄武)	牛	Niú	Ox	女	Niú	Ox	ξ^{1} Cap		牛宿增四	Niúsùzēngsì	4th additional star
The Black Tortoise of the North (北方玄武)	牛	Niú	Ox	女	Niú	Ox	3 Cap		牛宿增五	Niúsùzēngwǔ	5th additional star
The Black Tortoise of the North (北方玄武)	牛	Niú	Ox	女	Niú	Ox	α^{1} Cap	Sukhurmashu	牛宿增六	Niúsùzēngliù	6th additional star
The Black Tortoise of the North (北方玄武)	牛	Niú	Ox	女	Niú	Ox	ν Cap	Alshat	牛宿增七	Niúsùzēngqī	7th additional star
The Black Tortoise of the North (北方玄武)	牛	Niú	Ox	女	Niú	Ox	σ Cap		牛宿增八	Niúsùzēngbā	8th additional star
The Black Tortoise of the North (北方玄武)	牛	Niú	Ox	女	Niú	Ox	4 Cap		牛宿增九	Niúsùzēngjiǔ	9th additional star
The Black Tortoise of the North (北方玄武)	牛	Niú	Ox	女	Niú	Ox	HD 192310		牛宿增十	Niúsùzēngshí	10th additional star
The Black Tortoise of the North (北方玄武)	牛	Niú	Ox	女	Niú	Ox	β^{2} Cap		牛宿增十二	Niúsùzēngshíèr	12th additional star
The Black Tortoise of the North (北方玄武)	牛	Niú	Ox	女	Niú	Ox	HD 194960		牛宿增十四	Niúsùzēngshísì	14th additional star
The Black Tortoise of the North (北方玄武)	牛	Niú	Ox	天田	Tiāntián	Celestial Farmland					
The Black Tortoise of the North (北方玄武)	牛	Niú	Ox	天田	Tiāntián	Celestial Farmland	ω Cap		天田二	Tiāntiánèr	2nd star
The Black Tortoise of the North (北方玄武)	牛	Niú	Ox	天田	Tiāntián	Celestial Farmland	24 Cap		天田三	Tiāntiánsān	3rd star
The Black Tortoise of the North (北方玄武)	牛	Niú	Ox	天田	Tiāntián	Celestial Farmland	ψ Cap		天田四	Tiāntiánsì	4th star
The Black Tortoise of the North (北方玄武)	牛	Niú	Ox	羅堰	Luóyàn	Network of Dykes					
The Black Tortoise of the North (北方玄武)	牛	Niú	Ox	羅堰	Luóyàn	Network of Dykes	τ Cap		羅堰一	Luóyànyī	1st star
The Black Tortoise of the North (北方玄武)	牛	Niú	Ox	羅堰	Luóyàn	Network of Dykes	υ Cap		羅堰二	Luóyànèr	2nd star
The Black Tortoise of the North (北方玄武)	牛	Niú	Ox	羅堰	Luóyàn	Network of Dykes	17 Cap		羅堰三	Luóyànsān	3rd star
The Black Tortoise of the North (北方玄武)	牛	Niú	Ox	羅堰	Luóyàn	Network of Dykes	13 Cap		羅堰增一	Luóyànzēngyī	1st additional star
The Black Tortoise of the North (北方玄武)	女	Nǚ	Girl	十二國	Shíèrguó	Twelve States					
The Black Tortoise of the North (北方玄武)	女	Nǚ	Girl	十二國	Shíèrguó	Twelve States	φ Cap		楚	Chǔ	(One star of) Chu province
The Black Tortoise of the North (北方玄武)	女	Nǚ	Girl	十二國	Shíèrguó	Twelve States	ι Cap		代一	Dàiyī	1st star of Dai province
The Black Tortoise of the North (北方玄武)	女	Nǚ	Girl	十二國	Shíèrguó	Twelve States	38 Cap		代二	Dàièr	2nd star of Dai province
The Black Tortoise of the North (北方玄武)	女	Nǚ	Girl	十二國	Shíèrguó	Twelve States	37 Cap		代增一	Dàizēngyī	1st additional star of Dai province
The Black Tortoise of the North (北方玄武)	女	Nǚ	Girl	十二國	Shíèrguó	Twelve States	41 Cap		代增二	Dàizēngèr	2nd additional of Dai province
The Black Tortoise of the North (北方玄武)	女	Nǚ	Girl	十二國	Shíèrguó	Twelve States	35 Cap		韓	Hán	(One star of) Han province
The Black Tortoise of the North (北方玄武)	女	Nǚ	Girl	十二國	Shíèrguó	Twelve States	36 Cap		晉	Jìn	(One star of) Jin province
The Black Tortoise of the North (北方玄武)	女	Nǚ	Girl	十二國	Shíèrguó	Twelve States	χ Cap		齊	Qí	(One star of) Qi province
The Black Tortoise of the North (北方玄武)	女	Nǚ	Girl	十二國	Shíèrguó	Twelve States	θ Cap	Udang	秦一	Qínyī	1st star of Qin province
The Black Tortoise of the North (北方玄武)	女	Nǚ	Girl	十二國	Shíèrguó	Twelve States	30 Cap		秦二	Qínèr	2nd star of Qin province
The Black Tortoise of the North (北方玄武)	女	Nǚ	Girl	十二國	Shíèrguó	Twelve States	33 Cap		魏	Wèi	(One star of) Wei province
The Black Tortoise of the North (北方玄武)	女	Nǚ	Girl	十二國	Shíèrguó	Twelve States	ζ Cap		燕	Yān	(One star of) Yan province
The Black Tortoise of the North (北方玄武)	女	Nǚ	Girl	十二國	Shíèrguó	Twelve States	19 Cap		越	Yuè	(One star of) Yue province
The Black Tortoise of the North (北方玄武)	女	Nǚ	Girl	十二國	Shíèrguó	Twelve States	26 Cap		趙一	Zhàoyī	1st star of Zhao province
The Black Tortoise of the North (北方玄武)	女	Nǚ	Girl	十二國	Shíèrguó	Twelve States	27 Cap		趙二	Zhàoèr	2nd star of Zhao province
The Black Tortoise of the North (北方玄武)	女	Nǚ	Girl	十二國	Shíèrguó	Twelve States	20 Cap		鄭	Zhèng	(One star of) Zheng province
The Black Tortoise of the North (北方玄武)	女	Nǚ	Girl	十二國	Shíèrguó	Twelve States	η Cap		周一	Zhōuyī	1st star of Zhou province
The Black Tortoise of the North (北方玄武)	女	Nǚ	Girl	十二國	Shíèrguó	Twelve States	21 Cap		周二	Zhōuèr	2nd star of Zhou province
The Black Tortoise of the North (北方玄武)	虛	Xū	Emptiness	哭	Kū	Crying					
The Black Tortoise of the North (北方玄武)	虛	Xū	Emptiness	哭	Kū	Crying	μ Cap		哭一	Kūyī	1st star
The Black Tortoise of the North (北方玄武)	虛	Xū	Emptiness	哭	Kū	Crying	42 Cap		哭增一	Kūzēngyī	1st additional star
The Black Tortoise of the North (北方玄武)	虛	Xū	Emptiness	哭	Kū	Crying	44 Cap		哭增二	Kūzēngèr	2nd additional star
The Black Tortoise of the North (北方玄武)	虛	Xū	Emptiness	哭	Kū	Crying	45 Cap		哭增三	Kūzēngsān	3rd additional star
The Black Tortoise of the North (北方玄武)	虛	Xū	Emptiness	天壘城	Tiānlěichéng	Celestial Rampart					
The Black Tortoise of the North (北方玄武)	虛	Xū	Emptiness	天壘城	Tiānlěichéng	Celestial Rampart	46 Cap		天壘城二	Tiānlěichéngèr	2nd star
The Black Tortoise of the North (北方玄武)	虛	Xū	Emptiness	天壘城	Tiānlěichéng	Celestial Rampart	47 Cap		天壘城三	Tiānlěichéngsān	3rd star
The Black Tortoise of the North (北方玄武)	虛	Xū	Emptiness	天壘城	Tiānlěichéng	Celestial Rampart	λ Cap		天壘城四	Tiānlěichéngsì	4th star
The Black Tortoise of the North (北方玄武)	虛	Xū	Emptiness	天壘城	Tiānlěichéng	Celestial Rampart	50 Cap		天壘城五	Tiānlěichéngwu	5th star
The Black Tortoise of the North (北方玄武)	虛	Xū	Emptiness	天壘城	Tiānlěichéng	Celestial Rampart	29 Cap		天壘城七	Tiānlěichéngqī	7th star
The Black Tortoise of the North (北方玄武)	室	Shì	Encampment	壘壁陣	Lěibìzhèn	Line of Ramparts					
The Black Tortoise of the North (北方玄武)	室	Shì	Encampment	壘壁陣	Lěibìzhèn	Line of Ramparts	κ Cap		壘壁陣一	Lěibìzhènyī	1st star
The Black Tortoise of the North (北方玄武)	室	Shì	Encampment	壘壁陣	Lěibìzhèn	Line of Ramparts	ε Cap		壘壁陣二	Lěibìzhènèr	2nd star
The Black Tortoise of the North (北方玄武)	室	Shì	Encampment	壘壁陣	Lěibìzhèn	Line of Ramparts	γ Cap	Nashira			
The Black Tortoise of the North (北方玄武)	室	Shì	Encampment	壘壁陣	Lěibìzhèn	Line of Ramparts	γ Cap	Nashira	壘壁陣三	Lěibìzhènsān	3rd star
The Black Tortoise of the North (北方玄武)	室	Shì	Encampment	壘壁陣	Lěibìzhèn	Line of Ramparts	γ Cap	Nashira	哭星	Kūxīng	Star of crying
The Black Tortoise of the North (北方玄武)	室	Shì	Encampment	壘壁陣	Lěibìzhèn	Line of Ramparts	δ Cap	Deneb Algedi (for component Aa)			
The Black Tortoise of the North (北方玄武)	室	Shì	Encampment	壘壁陣	Lěibìzhèn	Line of Ramparts	δ Cap	Deneb Algedi (for component Aa)	壘壁陣四	Lěibìzhènsì	4th star
The Black Tortoise of the North (北方玄武)	室	Shì	Encampment	壘壁陣	Lěibìzhèn	Line of Ramparts	δ Cap	Deneb Algedi (for component Aa)	壘壁陣西第四星	Lěibìxīdìsìxīng	4th star in west row
The Black Tortoise of the North (北方玄武)	室	Shì	Encampment	壘壁陣	Lěibìzhèn	Line of Ramparts	δ Cap	Deneb Algedi (for component Aa)	哭星	Kūxīng	Star of crying
The Black Tortoise of the North (北方玄武)	室	Shì	Encampment	壘壁陣	Lěibìzhèn	Line of Ramparts	HD 205705		壘壁陣增八	Lěibìzhènzēngbā	8th additional star

== See also ==
- Traditional Chinese star names
- Chinese constellations
