= List of stars in Capricornus =

This is the list of notable stars in the constellation Capricornus, sorted by decreasing brightness.

Name	B	F	Var	HD	HIP	RA	Dec	vis. mag.	abs. mag.	Dist. (ly)	Sp. class	Notes
δ Cap	δ	49		207098	107556	21^{h} 47^{m} 02.29^{s}	−16° 07′ 35.6″	2.85	2.49	39	A5mF2 (IV)	Deneb Algedi, Scheddi; Algol variable, V_{max} = 2.81^{m}, V_{min} = 3.05^{m}, P = 1.0227688 d
β^{1} Cap	β^{1}	9		193495	100345	20^{h} 21^{m} 00.65^{s}	−14° 46′ 53.0″	3.05	−2.07	328	A5:n	Dabih; multiple star system; variable star, ΔV = 0.003^{m}, P = 1.40657 d
α^{2} Cap	α^{2}	6		192947	100064	20^{h} 18^{m} 03.22^{s}	−12° 32′ 41.5″	3.58	0.97	109	G6/G8III	Algedi Secunda, Secunda Giedi; suspected variable
γ Cap	γ	40		206088	106985	21^{h} 40^{m} 05.34^{s}	−16° 39′ 44.1″	3.69	0.54	139	A7III:mp...	Nashira; α ^{2} CVn variable
ζ Cap	ζ	34		204075	105881	21^{h} 26^{m} 40.03^{s}	−22° 24′ 41.0″	3.77	−1.66	398	G4Ibp...	Marakk, Yan (燕), Yen; suspected eclipsing binary
θ Cap	θ	23		200761	104139	21^{h} 05^{m} 56.78^{s}	−17° 13′ 57.8″	4.08	0.65	158	A1V	Udang, Dorsum, Qin (秦), Tsin,
ω Cap	ω	18		198542	102978	20^{h} 51^{m} 49.30^{s}	−26° 55′ 08.9″	4.12	−2.30	628	K4III	Baten Algiedi; suspected variable
ψ Cap	ψ	16		197692	102485	20^{h} 46^{m} 05.77^{s}	−25° 16′ 13.9″	4.13	3.30	48	F5V	Pazhan, Yue; rotating variable, V_{max} = 4.13^{m}, V_{min} = 4.14^{m}, P = 4.932 d
ι Cap	ι	32		203387	105515	21^{h} 22^{m} 14.78^{s}	−16° 50′ 04.4″	4.27	0.18	215	G8III	Dai (代), Tae; BY Dra variable, ΔV = 0.06^{m}
α^{1} Cap	α^{1}	5		192876	100027	20^{h} 17^{m} 38.86^{s}	−12° 30′ 29.6″	4.30	−2.32	686	G3Ib	Sukhurmashu, Algedi Prima, Prima Giedi; suspected variable
24 Cap	A	24		200914	104234	21^{h} 07^{m} 07.69^{s}	−25° 00′ 20.7″	4.49	−1.53	522	K5/M0III	
36 Cap	b	36		204381	106039	21^{h} 28^{m} 43.32^{s}	−21° 48′ 25.8″	4.50	0.80	179	K0III	Jin (晉), Tsin
ε Cap	ε	39		205637	106723	21^{h} 37^{m} 04.82^{s}	−19° 27′ 57.6″	4.51	−2.03	1060	B2.5Vpe	Castra, Kastra; binary star system; γ Cas variable, V_{max} = 4.48^{m}, V_{min} = 4.72^{m}
κ Cap	κ	43		206453	107188	21^{h} 42^{m} 39.42^{s}	−18° 51′ 58.7″	4.72	−0.03	291	G8III	
ν Cap	ν	8		193432	100310	20^{h} 20^{m} 39.81^{s}	−12° 45′ 32.6″	4.77	0.16	272	B9IV	Alshat
ρ Cap	ρ	11		194943	101027	20^{h} 28^{m} 51.62^{s}	−17° 48′ 49.2″	4.77	2.37	99	F3V	Bos
η Cap	η	22		200499	104019	21^{h} 04^{m} 24.32^{s}	−19° 51′ 17.8″	4.82	1.39	158	A5V	Armus, Zhou (周), Chow
μ Cap	μ	51		207958	108036	21^{h} 53^{m} 17.58^{s}	−13° 33′ 06.5″	5.07	2.87	90	F3IV	Kuh; suspected variable, ΔV = 0.03^{m}
π Cap	π	10		194636	100881	20^{h} 27^{m} 19.20^{s}	−18° 12′ 42.1″	5.08	−1.47	665	B4V	Okul
46 Cap	c	46		206834	107382	21^{h} 45^{m} 00.25^{s}	−09° 04′ 56.7″	5.10	−1.85	799	G8II-III	part of Saʽd al Suʽud
υ Cap	υ	15		196777	101984	20^{h} 40^{m} 02.96^{s}	−18° 08′ 19.0″	5.15	−1.67	755	M1III	suspected variable
42 Cap		42	BY	206301	107095	21^{h} 41^{m} 32.93^{s}	−14° 02′ 48.7″	5.16	2.60	106	G2V	RS CVn variable, V_{max} = 5.13^{m}, V_{min} = 5.18^{m}
φ Cap	φ	28		202320	104963	21^{h} 15^{m} 37.89^{s}	−20° 39′ 06.1″	5.17	−1.46	691	K0II/III	
τ^{2} Cap	τ^{2}	14		196662	101923	20^{h} 39^{m} 16.32^{s}	−14° 57′ 17.0″	5.24	−3.41	1753	B7III	
41 Cap	(h) (Note: Designated as h Globus Aerostatici by Bode in his Uranographia)	41		206356	107128	21^{h} 42^{m} 00.64^{s}	−23° 15′ 45.5″	5.24	0.84	247	K0III	
σ Cap	σ	7		193150	100195	20^{h} 19^{m} 23.60^{s}	−19° 07′ 06.6″	5.28	−1.37	697	K2III	
χ Cap	χ	25		201184	104365	21^{h} 08^{m} 33.61^{s}	−21° 11′ 36.7″	5.30	1.46	191	A0V	
29 Cap		29		202369	104974	21^{h} 15^{m} 44.83^{s}	−15° 10′ 17.4″	5.31	−1.11	628	M2III	semiregular variable
33 Cap		33		203638	105665	21^{h} 24^{m} 09.60^{s}	−20° 51′ 05.6″	5.38	1.16	228	K0III	suspected variable, V_{max} = 5.35^{m}, V_{min} = 5.77^{m}
30 Cap		30		202671	105143	21^{h} 17^{m} 57.28^{s}	−17° 59′ 06.5″	5.40	−0.85	579	B5II/III	α^{2} CVn variable
λ Cap	λ	48		207052	107517	21^{h} 46^{m} 32.08^{s}	−11° 21′ 57.4″	5.57	0.80	294	A1V	
HD 203475				203475	105576	21^{h} 23^{m} 00.47^{s}	−22° 40′ 08.6″	5.63	−0.92	667	M0III	variable star, ΔV = 0.018^{m}, P = 4.95221 d
HD 195564				195564	101345	20^{h} 32^{m} 23.51^{s}	−09° 51′ 13.1″	5.66	3.74	79	G3V	
HD 199260				199260	103389	20^{h} 56^{m} 47.27^{s}	−26° 17′ 46.4″	5.70	4.09	68	F7V	suspected variable, V_{max} = 5.68^{m}, V_{min} = 5.74^{m}
37 Cap		37		205289	106559	21^{h} 34^{m} 51.07^{s}	−20° 05′ 03.8″	5.70	3.53	88	F5V	
HD 192310				192310	99825	20^{h} 15^{m} 16.58^{s}	−27° 01′ 57.1″	5.73	6.00	29	K3V	suspected variable, V_{max} = 5.72^{m}, V_{min} = 5.76^{m}; has two planets (b) and (c)
19 Cap		19		199012	103226	20^{h} 54^{m} 47.85^{s}	−17° 55′ 22.3″	5.78	0.36	395	K0III	On 26 February 2008, it was occulted by Venus as viewed from East Australia, New Zealand, part of Antarctica.
35 Cap		35		204139	105928	21^{h} 27^{m} 14.83^{s}	−21° 11′ 46.1″	5.78	0.02	462	K3III	
HD 196857				196857	102026	20^{h} 40^{m} 32.56^{s}	−16° 07′ 27.7″	5.79	0.77	329	K0III	
ξ^{2} Cap	ξ^{2}	2		191862	99572	20^{h} 12^{m} 25.76^{s}	−12° 37′ 01.3″	5.84	3.60	91	F5V	
4 Cap		4		192879	100062	20^{h} 18^{m} 01.38^{s}	−21° 48′ 35.6″	5.86	0.76	341	G8III	
HD 198174				198174	102772	20^{h} 49^{m} 17.61^{s}	−25° 46′ 52.3″	5.86	−1.37	911	B8II	α^{2} CVn variable
44 Cap		44		206561	107232	21^{h} 43^{m} 04.40^{s}	−14° 23′ 59.1″	5.88	0.39	409	A9/F0V	On 2 April 2021, it was occulted by Jupiter as viewed from Western North America, South America, Antarctica.
HD 199443				199443	103460	20^{h} 57^{m} 40.61^{s}	−16° 01′ 53.6″	5.89	2.12	185	A2/A3III	α^{2} CVn variable
17 Cap		17		197725	102487	20^{h} 46^{m} 09.97^{s}	−21° 30′ 50.4″	5.91	1.32	270	A1V	
ο Cap A	ο	12		195094	101123	20^{h} 29^{m} 53.89^{s}	−18° 34′ 58.7″	5.94	1.62	239	A1V	binary star
45 Cap		45		206677	107302	21^{h} 44^{m} 00.98^{s}	−14° 44′ 57.8″	5.96	2.36	171	A7IV/V	On 3 August 2009, it was occulted by Jupiter.
47 Cap		47	AG	207005	107487	21^{h} 46^{m} 16.26^{s}	−09° 16′ 33.4″	6.00	−1.89	1235	M3III	semiregular variable, V_{max} = 5.9^{m}, V_{min} = 6.14^{m}, P = 25 d
HD 200052				200052	103777	21^{h} 01^{m} 45.27^{s}	−26° 52′ 51.4″	6.04	1.24	298	A3V	
HD 202261				202261	104914	21^{h} 15^{m} 06.62^{s}	−17° 20′ 42.3″	6.05	0.78	368	K0III	suspected variable
BW Cap			BW	208735	108494	21^{h} 58^{m} 43.78^{s}	−21° 10′ 58.5″	6.06	−3.64	2835	M2III	slow irregular variable
21 Cap		21		199947	103703	21^{h} 00^{m} 51.78^{s}	−17° 31′ 51.1″	6.07	−0.05	545	K3III	
HD 206005				206005	106938	21^{h} 39^{m} 28.09^{s}	−10° 34′ 36.4″	6.07	1.12	319	K0	
β^{2} Cap	β^{2}			193452	100325	20^{h} 20^{m} 46.52^{s}	−14° 47′ 05.6″	6.09	1.18	328	B9.5III/IV	component of the β Cap system
HD 195330				195330	101221	20^{h} 31^{m} 04.33^{s}	−15° 03′ 21.8″	6.10	1.15	318	K1/K2III+..	
HD 195838				195838	101507	20^{h} 34^{m} 11.66^{s}	−13° 43′ 16.5″	6.11	3.53	107	G0V	
HD 195006				195006	101090	20^{h} 29^{m} 31.34^{s}	−22° 23′ 29.4″	6.13	0.07	531	K5III	
HD 191110			AV	191110	99221	20^{h} 08^{m} 31.27^{s}	−10° 03′ 45.0″	6.18	0.15	524	B9.5III	α^{2} CVn variable
HD 201057				201057	104297	21^{h} 07^{m} 44.68^{s}	−17° 27′ 20.8″	6.18	0.57	432	B9.5V	
HD 196078				196078	101608	20^{h} 35^{m} 32.21^{s}	−16° 31′ 32.9″	6.19	1.91	235	A5II/III	
HD 207760				207760	107901	21^{h} 51^{m} 41.66^{s}	−18° 37′ 21.9″	6.19	2.15	210	F0V	
HD 198208				198208	102780	20^{h} 49^{m} 20.54^{s}	−18° 02′ 08.8″	6.20	−1.49	1124	K3III	
HD 206546				206546	107238	21^{h} 43^{m} 13.48^{s}	−19° 37′ 15.4″	6.23	1.02	360	A0m...	
27 Cap		27		201352	104452	21^{h} 09^{m} 32.93^{s}	−20° 33′ 22.8″	6.25	2.59	176	F2IV/V	
20 Cap		20	AO	199728	103616	20^{h} 59^{m} 36.13^{s}	−19° 02′ 06.8″	6.26	0.66	430	Ap Si	α^{2} CVn variable, V_{max} = 6.25^{m}, V_{min} = 6.30^{m}, P = 2.2411 d
HD 193896				193896	100524	20^{h} 23^{m} 00.78^{s}	−09° 39′ 16.8″	6.29	0.66	435	G5II-III	
HD 196947				196947	102094	20^{h} 41^{m} 24.26^{s}	−25° 59′ 59.5″	6.29	−0.19	644	K2III	
3 Cap		3		192666	99918	20^{h} 16^{m} 22.80^{s}	−12° 20′ 13.5″	6.30	0.26	527	B9IV	
HD 207503				207503	107750	21^{h} 49^{m} 41.02^{s}	−12° 43′ 22.5″	6.31	0.35	506	A1/A2III	
HD 198732				198732	103071	20^{h} 53^{m} 01.10^{s}	−23° 46′ 59.0″	6.32	1.94	245	K0III	
ξ^{1} Cap	ξ^{1}	1		191753	99529	20^{h} 11^{m} 57.90^{s}	−12° 23′ 32.5″	6.34	0.49	483	K0III	
HD 195549				195549	101384	20^{h} 32^{m} 52.35^{s}	−24° 56′ 37.4″	6.35	1.19	350	A0V	
HD 196761				196761	101997	20^{h} 40^{m} 11.44^{s}	−23° 46′ 30.0″	6.36	5.53	48	G8/K0V	
HD 196385				196385	101808	20^{h} 37^{m} 52.18^{s}	−25° 06′ 33.1″	6.38	2.87	164	A9V	
HD 203639				203639	105662	21^{h} 24^{m} 07.94^{s}	−22° 44′ 49.5″	6.38	0.56	476	K0III	
HD 207552				207552	107797	21^{h} 50^{m} 12.97^{s}	−16° 50′ 41.6″	6.38	−0.40	739	K3III	
BE Cap			BE	191639	99457	20^{h} 11^{m} 10.08^{s}	−08° 50′ 32.4″	6.39		2330	B1V	γ Cas variable, V_{max} = 6.16^{m}, V_{min} = 6.49^{m}
HD 205342				205342	106590	21^{h} 35^{m} 15.91^{s}	−23° 27′ 15.4″	6.39	1.03	385	K1III	
HD 194918				194918	101011	20^{h} 28^{m} 43.58^{s}	−15° 44′ 29.4″	6.41	0.02	617	G8III	
HD 204943				204943	106363	21^{h} 32^{m} 33.22^{s}	−24° 35′ 25.6″	6.43	2.22	226	A7V	
HD 203607				203607	105646	21^{h} 23^{m} 55.86^{s}	−25° 12′ 08.7″	6.47	−0.71	888	K1III	
HD 197540				197540	102414	20^{h} 45^{m} 13.12^{s}	−27° 14′ 50.3″	6.50	0.70	470	G8III	
HD 202940	(i) (Note: Designated as i Globus Aerostatici by Bode in his Uranographia)			202940	105312	21^{h} 19^{m} 45.63^{s}	−26° 21′ 10.39″	6.56		61		
HD 206893				206893	107412	21^{h} 45^{m} 22.0^{s}	−12° 47′ 00″	6.67		125	F5V	has a planet (b)
ο Cap B	ο	12		195093	101120	20^{h} 29^{m} 52.58^{s}	−18° 35′ 10.2″	6.74	3.63	136	A7/A8V	component of the ο Cap system
τ^{1} Cap	τ^{1}	13		196348	101751	20^{h} 37^{m} 21.16^{s}	−15° 08′ 50.0″	6.76	−0.40	883	K1III	
HD 202941	(k) (Note: Designated as k Globus Aerostatici by Bode in his Uranographia)			202941	105318	21^{h} 19^{m} 51.42^{s}	−27° 12′ 32.91″	7.00	1.04	524		
50 Cap		50		207061	107527	21^{h} 46^{m} 42.09^{s}	−11° 41′ 52.2″	7.01	3.04	203	F6V	
31 Cap		31		202723	105168	21^{h} 18^{m} 15.64^{s}	−17° 27′ 44.2″	7.07	1.99	338	F0V	
HD 205249			AS	205249	106497	21^{h} 34^{m} 16.57^{s}	−13° 29′ 01.5″	7.69		610	K0IIIp	RS CVn variable, V_{max} = 7.53^{m}, V_{min} = 7.80^{m}, P = 60.64 d
HD 204313				204313	106006	21^{h} 28^{m} 12.21^{s}	−21° 43′ 34.5″	7.99	4.61	154	G5V	has three planets (b, c & d)
HD 202206				202206	104903	21^{h} 14^{m} 57.77^{s}	−20° 47′ 21.15″	8.08	4.75	151	G6V	has a brown dwarf (b) and a planet (c)
HD 202772 A				202772		21^{h} 18^{m} 48.0^{s}	−26° 36′ 59″	8.32		480		has a planet (b)
RS Cap			RS	200994	104252	21^{h} 07^{m} 15.43^{s}	−16° 25′ 21.5″	8.36		2590	M6/M7III	semiregular variable
HD 204941				204941	106353	21^{h} 32^{m} 24^{s}	−20° 57′ 27″	8.45		88	K2V	has a planet (b)
AT Cap			AT	195040	101098	20^{h} 29^{m} 36.86^{s}	−21° 07′ 34.7″	8.87		4500	G6III/IV	RS CVn variable, V_{max} = 8.87^{m}, V_{min} = 9.18^{m}
HD 197027				197027	102152	20^{h} 41^{m} 54.63^{s}	−27° 12′ 57.4″	9.15		253.9	G3V	solar twin
AD Cap			AD	206046	106961	21^{h} 39^{m} 48.92^{s}	−16° 00′ 21.0″	9.77		1010	K0IV/V	RS CVn variable, ΔV = 0.262^{m}, P = 2.9592 d
WASP-111						21^{h} 55^{m} 04.0^{s}	−22° 36′ 45″	10.3		685	F5	has a transiting planet (b)
HD 358623			AZ	358623		20^{h} 56^{m} 02.74^{s}	−17° 10′ 53.7″	10.48			K6Ve+M2	T Tau star, ΔV = 0.098^{m}, P = 3.403 d
HD 193334				193334		20^{h} 20^{m} 23.0^{s}	−19° 18′ 53″	10.68			G2	WASP-68, has a transiting planet (b)
TW Cap			TW		99765	20^{h} 14^{m} 28.42^{s}	−13° 50′ 07.9″	10.7			A5Ib...	W Vir variable, V_{max} = 9.95^{m}, V_{min} = 11.4^{m}, P = 28.585 d
RV Cap			RV		103755	21^{h} 01^{m} 28.87^{s}	−15° 13′ 46.1″	10.97			A8	RR Lyr variable, V_{max} = 10.22^{m}, V_{min} = 11.57^{m}, P = 0.44774401 d
YZ Cap			YZ	358431	105285	21^{h} 19^{m} 32.41^{s}	−15° 07′ 01.2″	11.09		793	F5	RR Lyr variable, V_{max} = 11.02^{m}, V_{min} = 11.6^{m}, P = 0.2734563 d
HATS-3						20^{h} 49^{m} 50.0^{s}	−24° 25′ 44″	11.44		1477	F	has a planet (b)
Wolf 922			BB		106255	21^{h} 31^{m} 18.61^{s}	−09° 47′ 26.5″	11.99		27.049	M4.5e	BY Dra variable, V_{max} = 11.96^{m}, V_{min} = 11.99^{m}
WASP-89						20^{h} 55^{m} 36.0^{s}	−18° 58′ 16″	13.1			K3	has a transiting planet (b)
PSR B2045-16						20^{h} 48^{m} 35.45^{s}	−16° 16′ 43.0″					pulsar
Table legend: • Name = Proper name • B = Bayer designation • F or/and G. = Flamsteed designation or Gould designation • Var = Variable-star designation • HD = Henry Draper Catalogue designation number • HIP = Hipparcos Catalogue designation number • RA = Right ascension for the Epoch/Equinox J2000.0 • Dec = Declination for the Epoch/Equinox J2000.0 • vis. mag. = visual magnitude (m or m_{v}), also known as apparent magnitude • abs. mag. = absolute magnitude (M_{v}) • Dist. (ly) = Distance in light-years from Earth • Sp. class = Spectral class of the star in the stellar classification system • Notes = Common name(s) or alternate name(s); comments; notable properties [for example: multiple star status, range of variability if it is a variable star, exoplanets, etc.]

== See also ==
- List of stars by constellation
