= NGC 7073 =

Galaxy in the constellation Capricornus

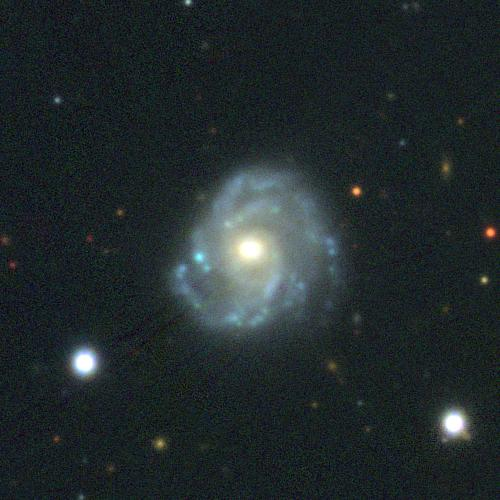
- Color image of NGC 7073 by PanSTARRS

Observation data (J2000 epoch)
- Constellation: Capricornus
- Right ascension: 21^{h} 29^{m} 26.0^{s}
- Declination: −11° 29′ 17″
- Redshift: 0.018496
- Heliocentric radial velocity: 5,545 km/s
- Distance: 233 Mly (71.4 Mpc)
- Apparent magnitude (V): 14.64

Characteristics
- Type: Sa/b
- Size: ~59,300 ly (18.19 kpc)
- Apparent size (V): 0.8 x 0.7

Other designations
- IRAS 21267-1142, MCG -2-54-10, Mrk 899, PGC 66847

NGC 7073 is a spiral galaxy located about 230 million light-years away in the constellation of Capricornus. NGC 7073 was discovered by astronomer Albert Marth on August 25, 1864.

== See also ==
- List of NGC objects (7001–7840)
- NGC 7019
