= Tau Capricorni =

Bayer designation

The Bayer designation Tau Capricorni (τ Cap, τ Capricorni) is shared by two star systems, in the constellation Capricornus:

- τ¹ Capricorni
- τ² Capricorni, being the brighter of the two, often simply called τ Capricorni

They are separated by 0.50° on the sky.
