= 36 Capricorni =

Star in the constellation Capricornus

- Location of 36 Capricorni (circled in red)

Observation data Epoch J2000 Equinox J2000
- Constellation: Capricornus
- Right ascension: 21^{h} 28^{m} 43.40070^{s}
- Declination: −21° 48′ 25.8504″
- Apparent magnitude (V): +4.50

Characteristics
- Evolutionary stage: red clump
- Spectral type: G7IIIb Fe–1
- B−V color index: 0.889

Astrometry
Radial velocity (R_{v})	−20.8±0.9 km/s
Proper motion (μ)	RA: +134.83 mas/yr Dec.: −5.73 mas/yr
Parallax (π)	19.06±0.29 mas
Distance	171 ± 3 ly (52.5 ± 0.8 pc)
Absolute magnitude (M_{V})	0.811

Details
Mass	2.26±0.19 M_{☉}
Radius	8.59±0.07 R_{☉}
Luminosity	43.15±0.69 L_{☉}
Surface gravity (log g)	2.96±0.10 cgs
Temperature	5,047±5 K
Metallicity [Fe/H]	−0.01±0.10 dex
Age	770±170 Myr

Other designations
- b Cap, 36 Cap, BD−22°5692, HD 204381, HIP 106039, HR 8213, SAO 190374

Database references
SIMBAD	data

36 Capricorni is a single, yellow-hued star in the southern constellation of Capricornus. It is visible to the naked eye with an apparent visual magnitude of +4.50. The distance to this star, as determined from an annual parallax shift of 19.06±0.29 mas, is around 171 light years. It is currently moving closer with a heliocentric radial velocity of −21 km/s, and will come within 145 ly (44.58 pc) in about 685,000 years ago.

This is an evolved G-type giant star with a stellar classification of G7IIIb Fe–1, where the suffix notation indicates an underabundance of iron found in the spectrum. At the age of 770 million years it has become a red clump giant, meaning it is generating energy through helium fusion at its core. It has 2.26 times the mass of the Sun, but has expanded to 8.6 times its radius. It is radiating 43 times the Sun's luminosity from its photosphere at an effective temperature of 5,047 K.

== Chinese name ==
In Chinese, 十二國 (Shíer Guó), meaning Twelve States, refers to an asterism which represents twelve ancient states in the Spring and Autumn period and the Warring States period, consisting of 36 Capricorni, φ Capricorni, ι Capricorni, 37 Capricorni, 35 Capricorni, χ Capricorni, θ Capricorni, 30 Capricorni, 33 Capricorni, ζ Capricorni, 19 Capricorni, 26 Capricorni, 27 Capricorni, 20 Capricorni, η Capricorni and 21 Capricorni. Consequently, 36 Capricorni itself represents the state Jin (晉) (or Tsin), together with κ Herculis in the Right Wall of Heavenly Market Enclosure asterism.
