= Eta Capricorni =

Binary star in the constellation Capricornus

- Location of η Capricorni (circled in red)

Observation data Epoch J2000 Equinox ICRS
- Constellation: Capricornus
- Right ascension: 21^{h} 04^{m} 24.297^{s}
- Declination: −19° 51′ 18.33″
- Apparent magnitude (V): +4.84 (5.02 + 7.39)

Characteristics
- Spectral type: A4 V + F2 V
- U−B color index: +0.09
- B−V color index: +0.17

Astrometry
Proper motion (μ)	RA: −28.702 mas/yr Dec.: −25.294 mas/yr
Parallax (π)	16.6009±0.4965 mas
Distance	196 ± 6 ly (60 ± 2 pc)
Absolute magnitude (M_{V})	+1.35

Orbit
Period (P)	27.85±0.15 yr
Semi-major axis (a)	0.265±0.003″
Eccentricity (e)	0.410±0.005
Inclination (i)	162.6±0.5°
Longitude of the node (Ω)	171.1±15.0°
Periastron epoch (T)	2002.46±0.09
Argument of periastron (ω) (secondary)	238.2±15.0°

Details

η Cap A
Mass	2.03±0.12 M_{☉}
Luminosity	24 L_{☉}
Metallicity [Fe/H]	−0.01 dex

η Cap B
Mass	1.21±0.07 M_{☉}

Other designations
- η Cap, 22 Cap, BD−20°6115, HD 200499, HIP 104019, HR 8060, SAO 189986, WDS J21044-1951AB

Database references
SIMBAD	data

Eta Capricorni, Latinized from η Capricorni, is a binary star system in the southern constellation of Capricornus. Its name is a Bayer designation. This system can be seen with the naked eye as a point of light having a combined apparent visual magnitude of +4.84. Based upon an annual parallax shift of 20.20 mas as seen from the Earth, the star is located about 196 light-years (60 pc) from the Sun.

The pair orbit each other with a period of 27.85 years, a semimajor axis of 0.265 arc seconds, and an eccentricity of 0.410. The primary member, component A, is a white-hued A-type main sequence star with an apparent magnitude of +5.02. Its companion, component B, has an apparent magnitude of +7.39.

== Nomenclature ==
η Capricorni (Latinised to Eta Capricorni) is the system's Bayer designation, abbreviated η Cap or Eta Cap. It also has the Flamsteed designation 22 Capricorni.

In Chinese, 十二國 (Shíer Guó), meaning Twelve States, refers to an asterism which represents twelve ancient states in the Spring and Autumn period and the Warring States period, consisting of η Capricorni, φ Capricorni, ι Capricorni, 38 Capricorni, 35 Capricorni, 36 Capricorni, χ Capricorni, θ Capricorni, 30 Capricorni, 33 Capricorni, ζ Capricorni, 19 Capricorni, 26 Capricorni, 27 Capricorni, 20 Capricorni and 21 Capricorni. Consequently, the Chinese name for η Capricorni itself is 周一 (Zhou yī, English: the First Star of Zhou), meaning that this star (together with 21 Capricorni and β Serpentis in Right Wall of Heavenly Market Enclosure (asterism)) represent Zhou (周, a dynasty in China).

Sometimes, this star is called by the name Armus in an astrological context.
