= LP 816-60 =

Star in the constellation Capricornus

- Location of LP 816-60 in the constellation Capricornus

Observation data Epoch J2000 Equinox ICRS
- Constellation: Capricornus
- Right ascension: 20^{h} 52^{m} 33.01660^{s}
- Declination: −16° 58′ 29.0033″
- Apparent magnitude (V): 11.458

Characteristics
- Evolutionary stage: main sequence
- Spectral type: M4V

Astrometry
Radial velocity (R_{v})	8.5 km/s
Proper motion (μ)	RA: -309.115 mas/yr Dec.: 37.051 mas/yr
Parallax (π)	177.9312±0.0365 mas
Distance	18.330 ± 0.004 ly (5.620 ± 0.001 pc)
Absolute magnitude (M_{V})	+12.63

Details
Mass	0.224±0.022 M_{☉}
Radius	0.266±0.012 R_{☉}
Surface gravity (log g)	4.584 cgs
Temperature	3030±27 K
Metallicity [Fe/H]	-0.11±0.07 dex
Rotation	67.6±0.1 d.
Rotational velocity (v sin i)	2.70±0.66 km/s
Age	2.57^{+8.15}_{−1.95} Gyr

Other designations
- HIP 103039, LP 816-60, NLTT 50038, TYC 6348-400-1, 2MASS J20523304-1658289

Database references
SIMBAD	data

LP 816-60 is a single red dwarf star of spectral type M4, located in constellation Capricornus at 18.33 light-years from Earth.

The discovery name of this star is LP 816-60, which indicates that its discovery was published between 1963 and 1981 in University of Minnesota, Minneapolis. LP 816-60 is known at least from 1979, when it was included to Luyten's catalogue NLTT.

No massive planets were detected around LP 816-60 as of 2013. The star has a magnetic starspot cycle of 10.6±1.7 years, and weak magnetic fields in chromosphere averaging 4.4 G.
