= HD 204313 b =

Extrasolar planet in the constellation Capricornus

Discovery
- Discovered by: Segransan et al.
- Discovery site: La Silla Observatory
- Discovery date: August 11, 2009
- Detection method: Radial velocity (CORALIE)

Orbital characteristics
- Semi-major axis: 3.185+0.130 −0.143 AU
- Eccentricity: 0.100±0.003
- Orbital period (sidereal): 5.588 ± 0.005 years (2,041.0 ± 1.8 d)
- Inclination: 72.917°+31.372° −21.476°
- Longitude of ascending node: 176.845°+118.200° −71.383°
- Time of periastron: 2449883.770+11.374 −10.368
- Argument of periastron: 286.990°+1.625° −1.784°
- Semi-amplitude: 69.433+0.308 −0.323 m/s
- Star: HD 204313

Physical characteristics
- Mass: 4.615+1.290 −0.306 M_{J}

HD 204313 b is an extrasolar planet which orbits the G-type main sequence star HD 204313, located approximately 155 light years away in the constellation Capricorn. This planet orbits the star at a distance of 3.082 astronomical units and takes 1931 days or 5.29 years to revolve around the star. It has a minimum mass four times that of Jupiter. However the radius is not known since this planet was not detected by the transit method or direct imaging. Instead, this planet was detected by the radial velocity method using the CORALIE Echelle spectrograph mounted on the 1.2 meter Euler Swiss Telescope located at La Silla Observatory in Atacama Desert, Chile on August 11, 2009.

The planet's existence was independently confirmed in 2015, and in 2022 its inclination and true mass were measured via astrometry.
