= Messier 30 =

Globular cluster in the constellation Capricornus

- Messier 30 imaged by the Hubble Space Telescope

Observation data (J2000 epoch)
- Class: V
- Constellation: Capricornus
- Right ascension: 21^{h} 40^{m} 22.12^{s}
- Declination: –23° 10′ 47.5″
- Distance: 27.14 ± 0.65 kly (8.3 ± 0.20 kpc)
- Apparent magnitude (V): 7.2
- Apparent dimensions (V): 12'.0

Physical characteristics
- Mass: 1.6×10^{5} M_{☉}
- Metallicity: [Fe/H] = –2.27 dex
- Estimated age: 12.93 Gyr
- Other designations: M30, NGC 7099, GCl 122

Messier 30 (also known as M30, NGC 7099, or the Jellyfish Cluster) is a globular cluster of stars in the southeast of the southern constellation of Capricornus, at about the declination of the Sun when the latter is at December solstice. (Note: Thus, its northern limit for good visibility is a few degrees south of the Arctic Circle, all year)

== Discovery and visibility ==
Messier 30 was discovered by the French astronomer Charles Messier in 1764, who described it as a circular nebula without a star. In the New General Catalogue, compiled during the 1880s, it was described as a "remarkable globular, bright, large, slightly oval." It can be easily viewed with a pair of 10×50 binoculars, forming a patch of hazy light some 4 arcminutes wide that is slightly elongated along the east–west axis. With a larger instrument, individual stars can be resolved and the cluster will cover an angle of up to 12 arcminutes across graduating into a compressed core about one arcminute wide that has further star density within.

It is longest observable (opposed to the Sun) in the first half of August. (Note: This is when it is risen, throughout the night, so culminates about midnight. The Earth's orbit means the sun leaves Capricornus, as if it heads east a few degrees NNE, on about 15 or 16 February, having figured in the constellation for a month.)

== Characteristics ==
M30 is centered 27,100 light-years away from Earth with a roughly 2.5% margin of error, and is about 93 light-years across. The estimated age is roughly 12.9 billion years and it forms a mass of about 160,000 times the mass of the Sun (M_{☉}). The cluster is following a retrograde orbit (against the general flow) through the inner galactic halo, suggesting that it was acquired from a satellite galaxy rather than forming within the Milky Way. It is in this epoch 22.2 kly (6.8 kpc), from the center of the galaxy, compared to an estimated 26 kly (8.0 kpc) for the Sun.

The cluster has passed through a dynamic process called core collapse and now has a concentration of mass at its core of about a million times the Sun's mass per cubic parsec. This makes it one of the highest density regions in the Milky Way galaxy. Stars in such close proximity will experience a high rate of interactions that can create binary star systems, as well as a type of star called a blue straggler that is formed by mass transfer. A process of mass segregation may have caused the central region to gain a greater proportion of higher mass stars, creating a color gradient with increasing blueness toward the middle of the cluster.

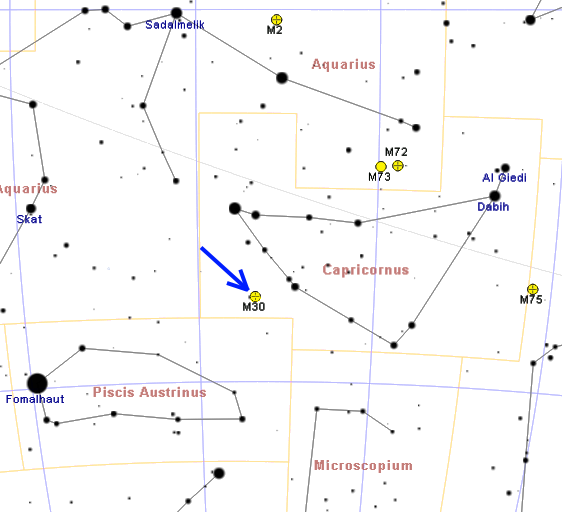
Masp showing the location of M30

== See also ==
- List of Messier objects
