= NGC 7019 =

Galaxy in the constellation Capricornus

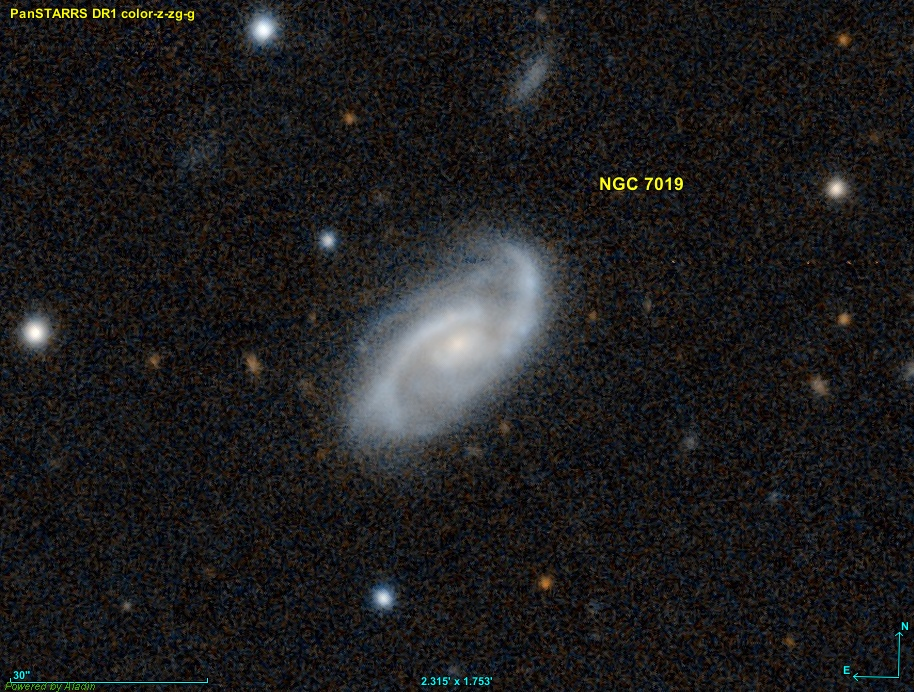
- The spiral galaxy NGC 7019.

Observation data (J2000 epoch)
- Constellation: Capricornus
- Right ascension: 21^{h} 06^{m} 25.7^{s}
- Declination: −24° 24′ 46″
- Redshift: 0.037226
- Heliocentric radial velocity: 11,160 km/s
- Distance: 480 Mly (148 Mpc)
- Apparent magnitude (V): 15.09

Characteristics
- Type: Sc
- Size: ~136,700 ly (41.91 kpc) (estimated)
- Apparent size (V): 1.3 x 0.9

Other designations
- ESO 529-22, AM 2103-243, IRAS 21035-2436, PGC 66107

NGC 7019 is a spiral galaxy located about 480 million light-years away in the constellation of Capricornus. It was discovered by American astronomer Francis Leavenworth in 1886. It is host to a supermassive black hole with an estimated mass of 7.5 × 10^{7} M_{☉}.

== See also ==
- List of NGC objects (7001–7840)
