= HD 202206 =

Binary star system in the constellation Capricornus

Observation data Epoch J2000.0 Equinox ICRS
- Constellation: Capricornus
- Right ascension: 21^{h} 14^{m} 57.76860^{s}
- Declination: −20° 47′ 21.1615″
- Apparent magnitude (V): +8.07±0.01

Characteristics
- Spectral type: G6V or G2V
- B−V color index: 0.714±0.012

Astrometry
Radial velocity (R_{v})	+14.63±0.19 km/s
Proper motion (μ)	RA: −39.173 mas/yr Dec.: −120.068 mas/yr
Parallax (π)	21.9392±0.0275 mas
Distance	148.7 ± 0.2 ly (45.58 ± 0.06 pc)
Absolute magnitude (M_{V})	+4.80

Details
Mass	1.06+0.07 −0.06 M_{☉}
Radius	1.04±0.02 R_{☉}
Luminosity	1.09±0.06 L_{☉}
Surface gravity (log g)	4.39+0.21 −0.19 cgs
Temperature	5,764+64 −58 K
Metallicity [Fe/H]	0.23+0.12 −0.13 dex
Rotational velocity (v sin i)	2.3±0.5 km/s
Age	3.94+1.28 −3.91 Gyr

Other designations
- BD−21°5972, HD 202206, HIP 104903, SAO 190163

Database references
SIMBAD	data
Exoplanet Archive	data

HD 202206 is a star in the southern constellation of Capricornus. With an apparent visual magnitude of +8.1, it is too faint to be visible to the naked eye. It is located at a distance of 150 light-years from the Sun based on parallax, and is drifting further away with a radial velocity of +14.6 km/s.

This is a G-type main-sequence star with a stellar classification of G6V, indicating it is generating energy through core hydrogen fusion. It is an estimated three billion years old and is spinning with a projected rotational velocity of 2.3 km/s. It is a metal-rich star – what astronomers term the abundance of elements of higher atomic number than helium – which may explain the star's unusually high luminosity for its class. The star has a slightly greater mass and radius compared to the Sun.

== Companions ==
In 2000, analysis of radial velocity measurements of the star revealed the existence of a brown dwarf companion with at least 17 times the mass of Jupiter around the star in an eccentric orbit with a period of around 256 days. Even after the brown dwarf was accounted for, the star still showed a drift in the radial velocity measurements, suggesting another companion in a longer-period orbit. In 2004 after further observations, the parameters of a planetary companion was announced, with a radial velocity semi-amplitude of 42 m/s. The planet is located approximately 3 times further from the star than the brown dwarf and has a mass 3 times that of Jupiter.

Further observation of this system via astrometry with the Hubble Space Telescope revised this picture in 2017, suggesting that the system was viewed nearly face-on and so the companions had true masses much greater than their minimum masses. The system would consist of a pair of co-orbiting stars being viewed nearly face-on, with the pair being orbited in turn by a super-Jupiter designated HD 202206 c. The secondary stellar companion, HD 202206 b, would be a red dwarf star with 8.9% of the mass of the Sun.

However, a subsequent study in 2026 using Gaia DR3 astrometry ruled out the 2017 model of the system and found smaller masses for the companions, closer to the original estimates. The two bodies (brown dwarf and planet) are in a 5:1 mean-motion resonance.

The HD 202206 planetary system
Companion (in order from star)	Mass	Semimajor axis (AU)	Orbital period (days)	Eccentricity	Inclination (°)	Radius
b	21.55+0.80 −0.81 M_{J}	0.81+0.01 −0.02	256.26±0.03	0.426±0.002	50.7+25.8 −1.4	—
c	3.09±0.14 M_{J}	2.39+0.04 −0.05	1,299.22+3.21 −2.76	0.171+0.021 −0.025	50.7+25.8 −1.4	—
