= HD 204313 =

Star in the constellation Capricornus

Observation data Epoch J2000.0 Equinox ICRS
- Constellation: Capricornus
- Right ascension: 21^{h} 28^{m} 12.20609^{s}
- Declination: −21° 43′ 34.5182″
- Apparent magnitude (V): 7.99

Characteristics
- Spectral type: G5V
- Apparent magnitude (B): 8.687
- Apparent magnitude (J): 6.812±0.024
- Apparent magnitude (H): 6.539±0.040
- Apparent magnitude (K): 6.459±0.018
- B−V color index: 0.697±0.022

Astrometry
Radial velocity (R_{v})	−9.79±0.12 km/s
Proper motion (μ)	RA: 42.751 mas/yr Dec.: −270.443 mas/yr
Parallax (π)	20.7705±0.0343 mas
Distance	157.0 ± 0.3 ly (48.15 ± 0.08 pc)
Absolute magnitude (M_{V})	4.61

Details
Mass	1.06±0.03 M_{☉}
Radius	1.08±0.03 R_{☉}
Luminosity	1.18±0.03 L_{☉}
Surface gravity (log g)	4.39±0.04 cgs
Temperature	5,783±48 K
Metallicity [Fe/H]	0.18 dex
Rotational velocity (v sin i)	0.846 km/s
Age	4.3±1.8 Gyr

Other designations
- CD−22°5691, GC 30045, HD 204313, HIP 106006, SAO 190362, PPM 272526, LTT 8525

Database references
SIMBAD	data
Exoplanet Archive	data

HD 204313 is a star with two and possibly three exoplanetary companions in the southern constellation of Capricornus. With an apparent magnitude of 7.99, it is an eighth magnitude star that is too faint to be readily visible to the naked eye. The star is located at a distance of 157 light years from the Sun based on parallax measurements, but it is drifting closer with a radial velocity of −10 km/s.

This is an ordinary G-type main-sequence star with a stellar classification of G5V, which indicates it is generating energy through hydrogen fusion at its core. It is an estimated four billion years old, chromospherically extremely quiet, and is spinning with a projected rotational velocity of just 0.8 km/s. The star has a slightly larger mass and radius compared to the Sun. It is radiating 118% of the luminosity of the Sun from its photosphere at an effective temperature of 5,783 K.

== Planetary system ==
This star was in observation by the CORALIE radial velocity planet-search program since the year 2000. In August 2009, a superjovian planetary companion was announced. Two years later, a hot Neptune HD 204313 c on a 35-day orbit was announced, followed by a third Jupiter-like planet candidate HD 204313 d on a 2800-day orbit, which was announced in 2012. Assuming that planet d exists, planets b & d are apparently orbiting close to a 7:5 mean motion resonance, which may be stabilizing their periods.

A 2015 study independently confirmed the first two discoveries, but did not detect any significant signal at the claimed period of planet d. Another study in 2022 agreed with these results, in addition to finding a new planet or brown dwarf, designated HD 204313 e to differentiate it from the dubious candidate. The inclination and true mass of planets b & e were measured via astrometry.

The HD 204313 planetary system
Companion (in order from star)	Mass	Semimajor axis (AU)	Orbital period (days)	Eccentricity	Inclination (°)	Radius
c	≥17.6±1.7 M_{🜨}	0.2099±0.0071	34.905±0.012	0.059+0.051 −0.041	—	—
b	4.615+1.290 −0.306 M_{J}	3.185+0.130 −0.143	2041.1+1.7 −1.9	0.100±0.003	72.917+31.372 −21.476	—
e	15.317+4.890 −5.183 M_{J}	7.457+0.399 −0.427	7325.6+399.9 −369.1	0.253+0.071 −0.065	176.092+0.963 −2.122	—

== See also ==
- HD 147018
- HD 171238
- List of extrasolar planets
