= NGC 6907 =

Galaxy in the constellation Capricornus

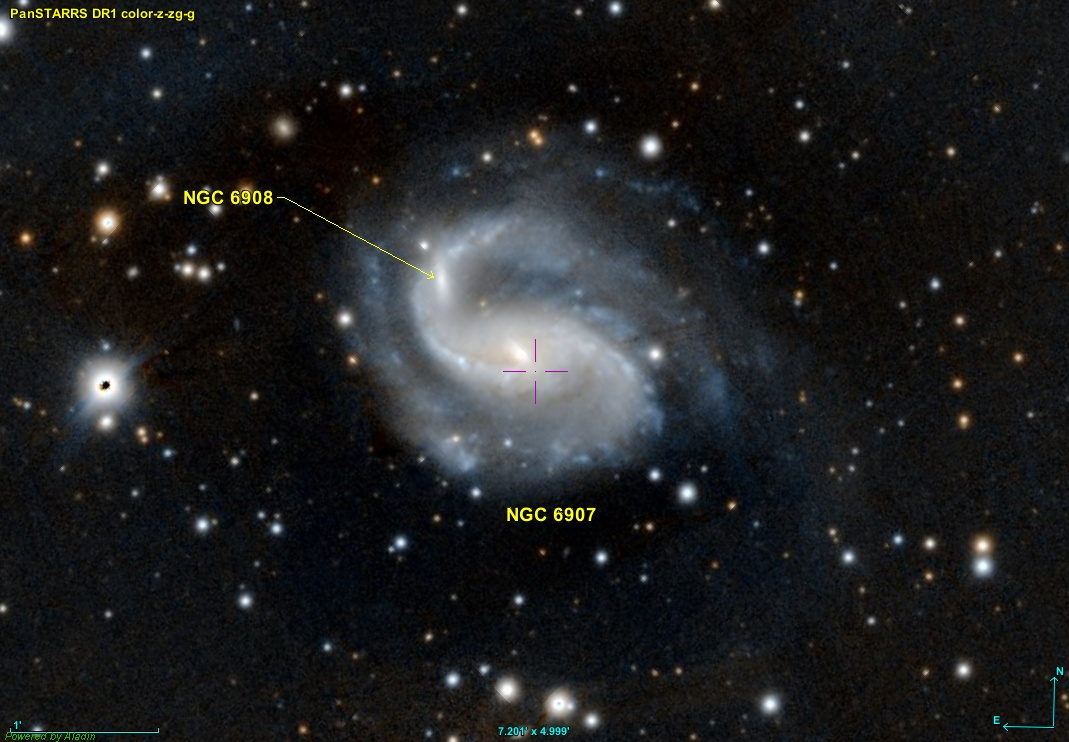
- NGC 6907 by Pan-STARRS

Observation data (J2000 epoch)
- Constellation: Capricornus
- Right ascension: 20^{h} 25^{m} 06.6^{s}
- Declination: −24° 48′ 33″
- Redshift: 0.010614 ± 0.000013
- Heliocentric radial velocity: 3,182 ± 4 km/s
- Distance: 118 Mly (36.3 Mpc)
- Apparent magnitude (V): 11.1

Characteristics
- Type: SB(s)bc
- Apparent size (V): 3′.3 × 2′.7
- Notable features: Luminous infrared galaxy

Other designations
- UGCA 418, ESO 528- G003, MCG -04-48-006, IRAS 20221-2458, PGC 64650

NGC 6907 is a spiral galaxy located in the constellation Capricornus. It is located at a distance of about 120 million light-years from Earth, which, given its apparent dimensions, means that NGC 6907 is about 115,000 light-years across. It was discovered by William Herschel on July 12, 1784. The total infrared luminosity of the galaxy is 10^{11.03} L_{☉}, and thus it is categorised as a luminous infrared galaxy.

== Characteristics ==
NGC 6907 is a grand design spiral galaxy with two spiral arms. It has an elliptical bulge that is skewed towards the base of the arms. The inner arms are bright and with knots, forming a bar. There are dust lanes in the arms. The disk of NGC 6907 is asymmetric. The eastern arm changes pitch angle and becomes linear after the location of the nearby galaxy NGC 6908. The western arm is less strong, but it is considerably longer, as its outermost parts form an arc with H II regions, wrapping nearly 360 degrees around the disk and forming a pseudoring. NGC 6907 also has a tidal tail with low surface brightness. The asymmetric tail extends from the north part of the disk of the galaxy towards the west and southwest. Its presence is an indicator of an ongoing unequal mass merger. The total HI mass of NGC 6907 is estimated to be (8.3±0.4)×10^{9} M_{☉}.

NGC 6907 interacts with a low-luminosity lenticular galaxy, known as NGC 6908, that is superimposed on the eastern arm of NGC 6907, lying 40 arcseconds off the nucleus of NGC 6907. NGC 6908 was thought for many years to be actually part of NGC 6907, which was described as having two massive asymmetric arms; however, when observed in infrared, it becomes apparent NGC 6908 is a different galaxy. As NGC 6908 passed through the disk of NGC 6907, a stellar and gas bridge was formed between the two galaxies that has been observed as high-velocity gas. It is estimated that NGC 6908 passed through the disk approximately 35 million years ago.

== Nearby galaxies ==
NGC 6907 is the more prominent member of a small galaxy group known as the NGC 6907 group or LGG 436. Other members of the group, apart from NGC 6908, include IC 4999 and IC 5005. These two galaxies lie 61 and 74 arcminutes off NGC 6907, respectively. The group seems to form, with some other galaxies lying at similar redshift, like ESO 462- G016, a sheet of galaxies that extends 10 degrees in the sky, which corresponds to 7 Mpc at the distance of NGC 6907.

== Supernovae ==
NGC 6907 has been home to four supernovae:

- SN 1984V (type unknown, mag 15.0) was discovered by L. E. Gonzalez on 29 May 1984.
- SN 2004bv (Type Ia, mag 15.6) was discovered by R. Kushida on 24 May 2004.
- SN 2008fq (Type II, mag 15.4) was discovered by the Lick Observatory Supernova Search (LOSS) on 15 September 2008.
- SN 2014eh (Type Ic, mag 16.0) was discovered by LOSS on 28 October 2014.

== Gallery ==
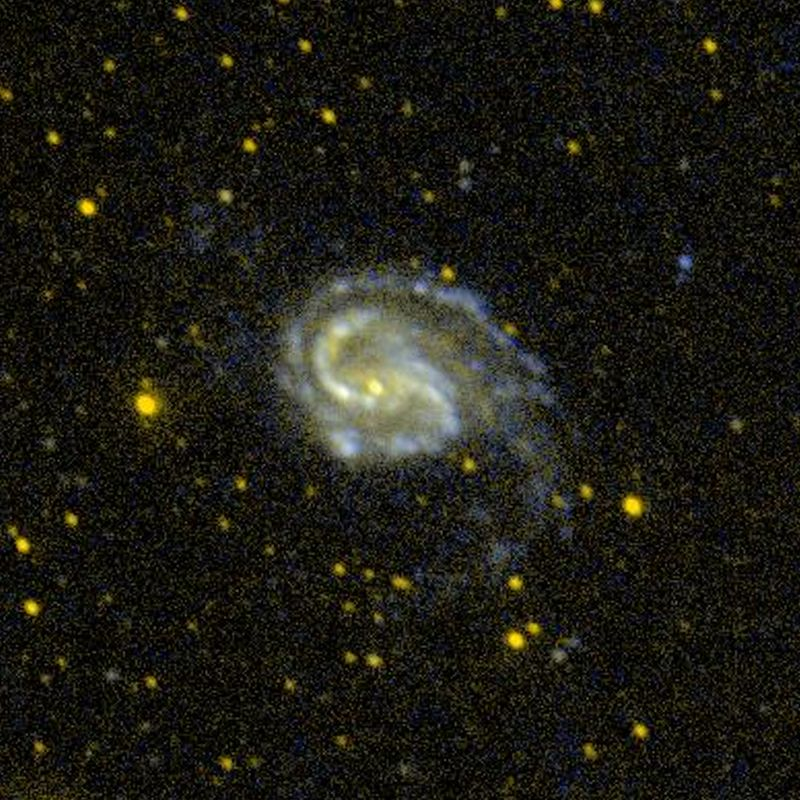
NGC 6907 by GALEX.

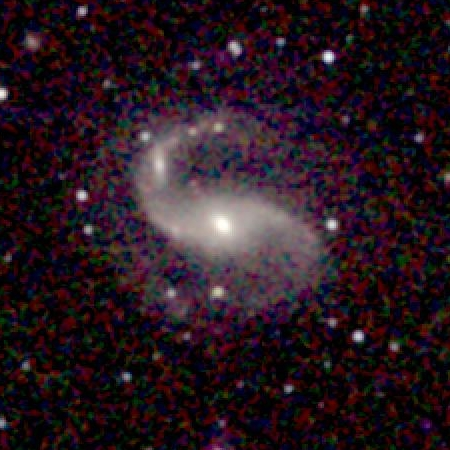
NGC 6907 taken by 2MASS. NGC 6908 can be seen at the eastern arm.

== See also ==
- NGC 1097 – another spiral galaxy with a smaller companion
