= Chi Capricorni =

Star in the constellation Capricornus

- Location of χ Capricorni (circled)

Observation data Epoch J2000.0 Equinox J2000.0 (ICRS)
- Constellation: Capricornus
- Right ascension: 21^{h} 08^{m} 33.625^{s}
- Declination: −21° 11′ 37.21″
- Apparent magnitude (V): +5.28

Characteristics
- Evolutionary stage: main sequence
- Spectral type: A0 V
- B−V color index: +0.01

Astrometry
Radial velocity (R_{v})	–8.9±0.8 km/s
Proper motion (μ)	RA: +18.927 mas/yr Dec.: −60.119 mas/yr
Parallax (π)	16.7451±0.0935 mas
Distance	195 ± 1 ly (59.7 ± 0.3 pc)
Absolute magnitude (M_{V})	+1.59

Details
Mass	2.20±0.04 M_{☉}
Radius	1.85±0.04 R_{☉}
Luminosity	26.76±0.3 L_{☉}
Surface gravity (log g)	4.066±0.006 cgs
Temperature	9,646^{+12}_{−11} K
Metallicity [Fe/H]	−0.41±0.06 dex
Rotational velocity (v sin i)	212 km/s
Age	238^{+94}_{−38} Myr

Other designations
- χ Cap, 25 Cap, BD−21°5933, FK5 3690, HD 201184, HIP 104365, HR 8087, SAO 190050

Database references
SIMBAD	data

Chi Capricorni is a star in the southern constellation of Capricornus. Its name is a Bayer designation that is Latinized from χ Capricorni, and abbreviated Chi Cap or χ Cap. This star is visible to the naked eye with an apparent visual magnitude of +5.28. Based upon an annual parallax shift of 18.14 mas as seen from the Earth, the star is located about 195 light-years (60 pc) from the Sun. The star is drifting closer to the Sun with a line of sight velocity of –9 km/s.

== Properties ==
This is an A-type main sequence star with a stellar classification of A0 V. It is a candidate Lambda Boötis star, showing a chemically peculiar spectrum with a low abundance of most elements heavier than oxygen. The star is around 238 million years old and is spinning rapidly with a projected rotational velocity of 212 km/s. It has 2.20 times the mass of the Sun and 1.85 times the Sun's radius. The star is radiating 27 times the solar luminosity from its photosphere at an effective temperature of 9,646 K.

At an angular separation of 1,199 arcseconds lies a faint proper motion companion designated HIP 99550. At the estimated distance of Chi Capricorni, this is equal to a projected separation of 28,300 AU. It has a visual magnitude of 10.94 and a classification of M0 Vk, indicating this is a red dwarf star.

== Chinese Name ==
In Chinese, 十二國 (Shíer Guó), meaning Twelve States, refers to an asterism which is represent twelve ancient states in the Spring and Autumn period and the Warring States period, consisting of χ Capricorni, φ Capricorni, ι Capricorni, 38 Capricorni, 35 Capricorni, 36 Capricorni, θ Capricorni, 30 Capricorni, 33 Capricorni, ζ Capricorni, 19 Capricorni, 26 Capricorni, 27 Capricorni, 20 Capricorni, η Capricorni and 21 Capricorni. Consequently, the Chinese name for χ Capricorni itself represents the state Qi (齊), together with 112 Herculis in Left Wall of Heavenly Market Enclosure (asterism).

R. H. Allen had the opinion that χ Capricorni, together with φ Capricorni, were represent the state Wei (魏).
