= HD 192310 c =

Extrasolar planet in the constellation Capricornus

Discovery
- Discovery site: La Silla Observatory
- Detection method: Radial velocity (HARPS)

Orbital characteristics
- Semi-major axis: 1.18 AU
- Eccentricity: 0.32
- Orbital period (sidereal): 1.4 y
- Star: HD 192310

Physical characteristics
- Mean radius: 0.469 R_{J}
- Mass: 23.4 M_{🜨}
- Temperature: 185 K

HD 192310 c is an exoplanet orbiting the star HD 192310 (HR 7722) which is about 29 light years away in the far south-west of Capricornus. It is a Neptune-sized planet and was discovered on 17 August 2011 by the HARPS program.

The planet has a mass of ≥24 ± 5 Earth masses (M_{🜨}) and orbits its parent star at a semimajor axis of 1.18 ± 0.025 AU, an eccentricity of 0.32 ± 0.11, and in 525.8 ± 9.2 days. Its orbit lies mainly beyond HD 192310's habitable zone, meaning it is too cold to support advanced life directly analogous to that which is known, but due to its elliptical orbit it passes into the habitable zone briefly each orbit. The expression "lies within the habitable zone" is defined as the ability to retain liquid water at its surface. While the potential for life on the gas giant is unknown, any larger moons may be able to support a habitable environment. Tidal models for hypothetical moon-planet-star interactions suggest that over the lifetime of HD 192310 c, large moons should be able to remain in orbit around the system. On the other hand, it is unclear whether such moons could have formed in the first place. However, the large mass of the gas giant may increase the possibility of the formation of larger moons.

== See also ==
- List of star systems within 25–30 light-years
