= IC 1337 =

Galaxy in the constellation Capricornus

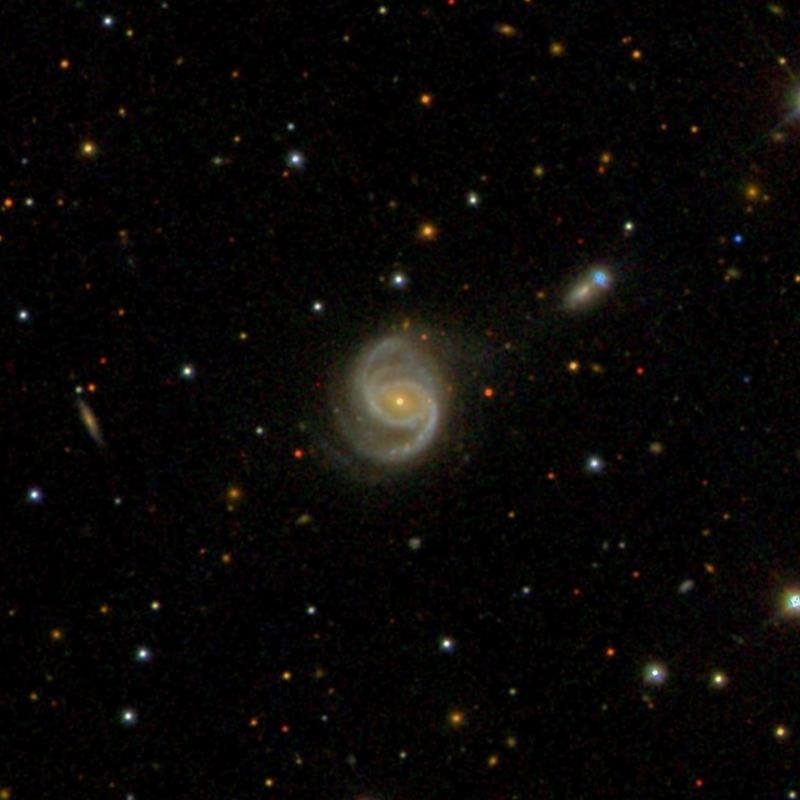
- IC 1337 by SDSS

Observation data (J2000 epoch)
- Constellation: Capricornus
- Right ascension: 20^{h} 56^{m} 52.742^{s}
- Declination: −16° 35′ 08.88″
- Redshift: 0.030741
- Heliocentric radial velocity: 9216 ± 10 km/s
- Distance: ~420 Mly (129 Mpc)
- Apparent magnitude (V): 14.5

Characteristics
- Type: SAB(r)b pec
- Apparent size (V): 1.2' x 1.1'

Other designations
- MCG-03-53-012, PGC 65760

IC 1337 is an intermediate spiral galaxy in the constellation Capricornus. The galaxy is located close to the celestial equator. It was discovered by Stéphane Javelle on July 22, 1892.

One supernova has been observed in IC 1337: SN 2019gwl (type II, mag. 19.15).
