= Theta Capricorni =

Binary star in the constellation Capricornus

- Location of θ Capricorni (circled)

Observation data Epoch J2000.0 Equinox J2000.0 (ICRS)
- Constellation: Capricornus
- Right ascension: 21^{h} 05^{m} 56.82783^{s}
- Declination: −17° 13′ 58.3021″
- Apparent magnitude (V): +4.07

Characteristics
- Evolutionary stage: main sequence
- Spectral type: A1 V
- U−B color index: +0.01
- B−V color index: −0.01

Astrometry
Radial velocity (R_{v})	−10.9 km/s
Proper motion (μ)	RA: +79.33 mas/yr Dec.: −62.01 mas/yr
Parallax (π)	20.11±0.28 mas
Distance	162 ± 2 ly (49.7 ± 0.7 pc)
Absolute magnitude (M_{V})	+0.60

Orbit
Primary	A
Name	B
Period (P)	143 days
Semi-major axis (a)	0.78 AU

Details

A
Mass	2.54 M_{☉}
Radius	2.35 R_{☉}
Luminosity	65 L_{☉}
Surface gravity (log g)	4.19±0.14 cgs
Temperature	10,221 K
Metallicity [Fe/H]	+0.26 dex
Rotational velocity (v sin i)	104 km/s
Age	280 Myr

B
Mass	0.56 M_{☉}
Radius	0.52 R_{☉}
Temperature	3,900 K
Age	280 Myr

Other designations
- Udang, Dorsum, θ Cap, 23 Cap, BD−17°6174, FK5 1552, HD 200761, HIP 104139, HR 8075, SAO 164132

Database references
SIMBAD	data

Theta Capricorni, Latinized from θ Capricorni, (Theta Cap or θ Cap) formally named Udang, is a binary star system in the southern constellation of Capricornus, positioned 0.58° south of the ecliptic. It can be seen with the naked eye, having an apparent visual magnitude of +4.07. Based upon an annual parallax shift of 20.11 mas as seen from the Earth, the star is about 162 light-years (50 pc) from the Sun. It is drifting closer with a radial velocity of −11 km/s.

The star or star system is almost eclipsed by the Sun on about 3 February, when it will figure behind the Sun's corona if there is a full solar eclipse. Thus the star can be viewed the whole night, crossing the sky, in early August (in the current epoch). It can be occulted by the Moon.

== Nomenclature ==
Theta Capricorni is the star's Bayer designation, which is Latinized from θ Capricorni and abbreviated Theta Cap or θ Cap. Sometimes (primarily in astrological sources), this star is called by the name Dorsum, meaning the back (of the goat) in Latin.

Udang, the Shrimp, is a constellation from Bali (Indonesia), identified with Capricornus. It is anchored in the cultural calendar called Palelintangan which is attested for ~1300 years. The IAU Working Group on Star Names approved the name Udang for Theta Capricorni A on 22 February 2026.

In Chinese, 十二國 (Shíer Guó), meaning Twelve States, refers to an asterism which represents twelve ancient states in the Spring and Autumn period and the Warring States period, consisting of θ Capricorni, φ Capricorni, ι Capricorni, 38 Capricorni, 35 Capricorni, 36 Capricorni, χ Capricorni, 30 Capricorni, 33 Capricorni, ζ Capricorni, 19 Capricorni, 26 Capricorni, 27 Capricorni, 20 Capricorni, η Capricorni and 21 Capricorni. Consequently, the Chinese name for θ Capricorni itself is 秦一 (Qin yī, English: the First Star of Qin), meaning that this star (together with 30 Capricorni) and δ Serpentis in Right Wall of Heavenly Market Enclosure (asterism) represents the state Qin (秦) (or Tsin).

== Characteristics ==
Radial velocity variations indicated it may be a binary star system, but when the system was examined in the infrared, no companion was detected. However, a companion was subsequently confirmed in 2023 by direct observations by an interferometer.

The main component of this system is an A-type main sequence star with a stellar classification of A1 V. Theta Capricorni has an estimated 2.54 times the mass of the Sun and around 2.35 times the Sun's radius. It is 280 million years old and is spinning fairly rapidly with a projected rotational velocity of 104 km/s. The star is radiating 65 times the solar luminosity from its photosphere at an effective temperature of around 10,000 K.

The secondary component does not have a known stellar classification, but is much smaller and cooler than its primary, with about 50% the mass and radius of the Sun, and a temperature of 3,900 K. It takes 140 days (4.6 months) to complete an orbit around the barycenter, and is separated from its primary by 0.78 astronomical units.
