= 41 Capricorni =

Star in the constellation Capricornus

Observation data Epoch J2000 Equinox ICRS
- Constellation: Capricornus
- Right ascension: 21^{h} 28^{m} 43.40070^{s}
- Declination: −21° 48′ 25.8504″
- Apparent magnitude (V): +5.24

Characteristics
- Evolutionary stage: red clump
- Spectral type: K0 III
- B−V color index: 0.991±0.002

Astrometry
Radial velocity (R_{v})	−45.1±1.3 km/s
Proper motion (μ)	RA: +134.83 mas/yr Dec.: −5.73 mas/yr
Parallax (π)	19.06±0.29 mas
Distance	171 ± 3 ly (52.5 ± 0.8 pc)
Absolute magnitude (M_{V})	0.99

Details
Mass	2.55 M_{☉}
Radius	9.8 R_{☉}
Luminosity	48.25 L_{☉}
Surface gravity (log g)	3.05 cgs
Temperature	4,910 K
Metallicity [Fe/H]	−0.01 dex
Age	550 Myr

Other designations
- 41 Cap, CD−23°17057, GC 30365, HD 206356, HIP 107128, HR 8285, SAO 190559, ADS 15223, CCDM J21420-2316

Database references
SIMBAD	data

41 Capricorni is a binary star system in the southern constellation of Capricornus. It is faintly visible to the naked eye with an apparent visual magnitude of +5.24. The distance to this star, based upon an annual parallax shift of 19.06±0.29 mas, is around 171 light years. It is moving closer with a heliocentric radial velocity of −45 km/s.

This is a yellow K-type giant star with a stellar classification of K0 III. At the age of around 550 million years it has become a red clump star, which indicates it is generating energy via helium fusion at its core. It has an estimated 2.55 times the mass of the Sun and is radiating 48 times the Sun's luminosity from its photosphere at an effective temperature of 4,910 K. The magnitude 11.5 companion lies at an angular separation of 5.5″, as of 2008.
