= Mu Capricorni =

Star in the constellation Capricornus

Observation data Epoch J2000.0 Equinox J2000.0 (ICRS)
- Constellation: Capricornus
- Right ascension: 21^{h} 53^{m} 17.770^{s}
- Declination: −13° 33′ 06.37″
- Apparent magnitude (V): +5.081

Characteristics
- Evolutionary stage: main sequence
- Spectral type: F2 V
- U−B color index: +0.012
- B−V color index: +0.367

Astrometry
Radial velocity (R_{v})	−21.5 km/s
Proper motion (μ)	RA: +310.526 mas/yr Dec.: +12.627 mas/yr
Parallax (π)	37.3377±0.1107 mas
Distance	87.4 ± 0.3 ly (26.78 ± 0.08 pc)
Absolute magnitude (M_{V})	+2.96±0.04

Details
Mass	1.437±0.04 M_{☉}
Radius	1.722±0.035 R_{☉}
Luminosity	5.56±0.04 L_{☉}
Surface gravity (log g)	4.077^{+0.028}_{−0.005} cgs
Temperature	6,755^{+2}_{−5} K
Metallicity [Fe/H]	−0.14 dex
Rotational velocity (v sin i)	69.3±3.5 km/s
Age	1.80±0.34 Gyr

Other designations
- μ Cap, 51 Cap, BD−14°6149, FK5 1577, GJ 838.5, GJ 9761, HD 207958, HIP 108036, HR 8351, SAO 164713

Database references
SIMBAD	data

Mu Capricorni is a solitary, yellow-white hued star in the southern constellation of Capricornus. Its name is a Bayer designation that is Latinized from μ Capricorni, and abbreviated Mu Cap or μ Cap. The star is visible to the naked eye with an apparent visual magnitude of +5.08. Based upon an annual parallax shift of 37.57 mas as seen from the Earth, the star is located at a distance of 87.4 light-years (26.8 pc) from the Sun. It is drifting closer with a line of sight velocity of −21.5 km/s. The proximity of this star to the ecliptic means it is subject to lunar occultation.

This is an ordinary F-type main sequence star with a stellar classification of F2 V, which indicates it is generating energy through hydrogen thermonuclear fusion at its core. It is an estimated 1.8 billion years old and is spinning with a projected rotational velocity of 69 km/s. The star has 1.44 times the mass of the Sun and 1.72 times the Sun's radius. It is radiating 5.56 times the luminosity of the Sun from its photosphere at an effective temperature of 6,755 K.

In Chinese, 哭 (Kū), meaning Crying, refers to an asterism consisting of μ Capricorni and 38 Aquarii. Consequently, the Chinese name for μ Capricorni itself is 哭一 (Kū yī, English: the First Star of Crying.). From this Chinese name, the name Kuh has appeared.
