= 42 Capricorni =

Binary star system in the constellation Capricornus

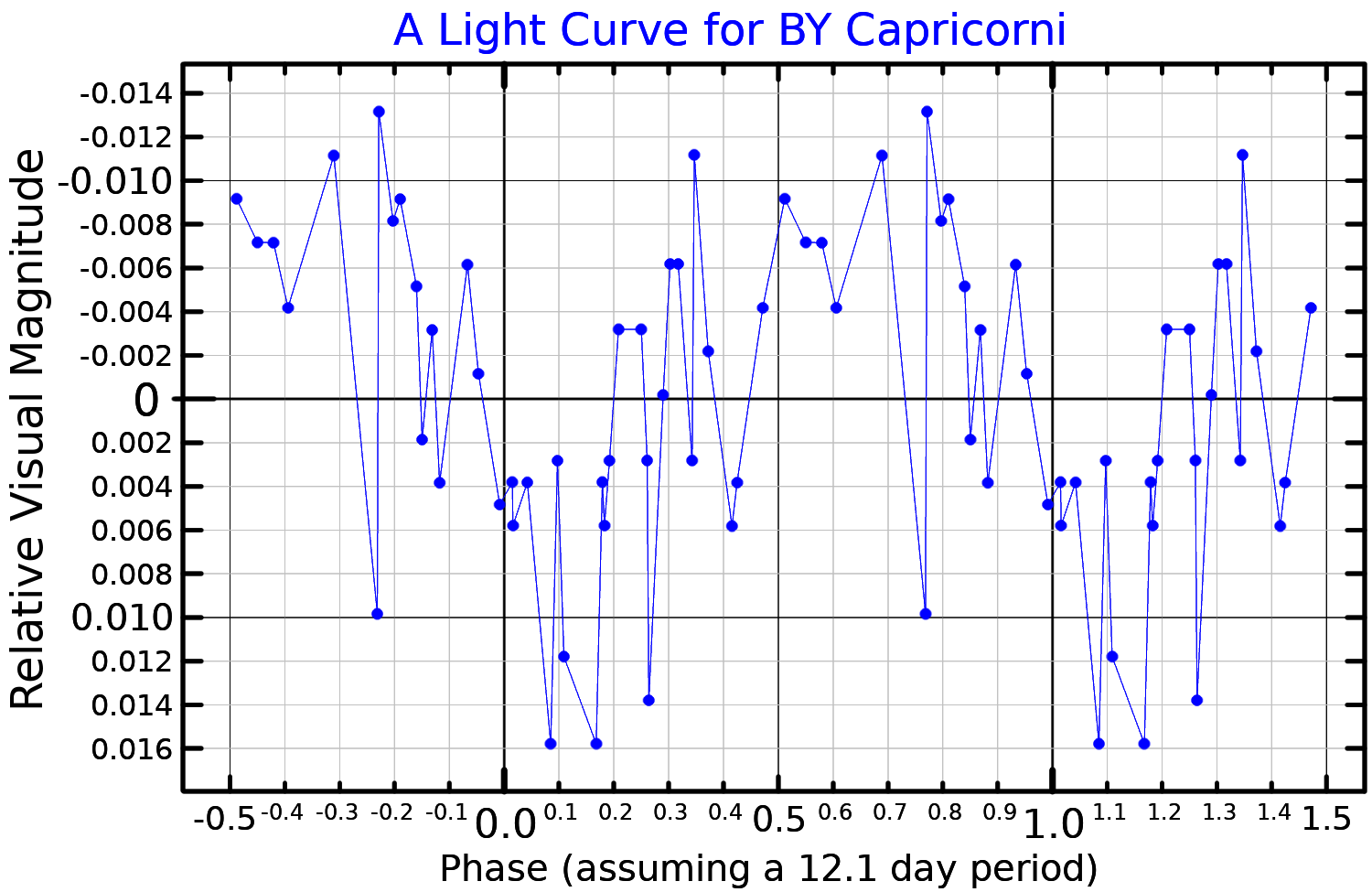
- A visual band light curve of BY Capricorni, adapted from Henry et al. (1995)

Observation data Epoch J2000 Equinox ICRS
- Constellation: Capricornus
- Right ascension: 21^{h} 41^{m} 32.85882^{s}
- Declination: −14° 02′ 51.3964″
- Apparent magnitude (V): 5.18

Characteristics
- Spectral type: G1 IV (G1 IV + G2 V)
- U−B color index: +0.20
- B−V color index: +0.65
- Variable type: RS CVn

Astrometry
Radial velocity (R_{v})	−1.20±0.05 km/s
Proper motion (μ)	RA: −123.05 mas/yr Dec.: −308.50 mas/yr
Parallax (π)	30.09±0.32 mas
Distance	108 ± 1 ly (33.2 ± 0.4 pc)
Absolute magnitude (M_{V})	+2.73 (2.79 + 4.73)

Orbit
Period (P)	13.174 d
Eccentricity (e)	0.1763±0.0025
Periastron epoch (T)	2447863.626 ± 0.027 JD
Argument of periastron (ω) (secondary)	166.45±0.83°
Semi-amplitude (K_{1}) (primary)	25.57±0.06 km/s
Semi-amplitude (K_{2}) (secondary)	35.16±0.25 km/s

Details

42 Cap A
Mass	1.09 M_{☉}
Radius	2.6 R_{☉}
Surface gravity (log g)	3.76 cgs
Temperature	5,634 K
Metallicity [Fe/H]	−0.10 dex
Rotational velocity (v sin i)	5.2 km/s
Age	6.7 Gyr

42 Cap B
Rotational velocity (v sin i)	4.4 km/s

Other designations
- BY Cap, 42 Cap, BD−14°6102, FK5 1150, HD 206301, HIP 107095, HR 8283, SAO 164580

Database references
SIMBAD	data

42 Capricorni is a binary star system in the zodiac constellation of Capricornus. It has a combined apparent visual magnitude of 5.18, so it is faintly visible to the naked eye. Its annual parallax shift of 30.09 mas yields a distance estimate of about 108 light years; the system is moving closer to the Sun with a radial velocity of −1.2 km/s. 42 Capricorni is 0.2 degree south of the ecliptic and so is subject to lunar occultations.

In 1995 Gregory W. Henry et al. announced that 42 Capricorni is a variable star, a discovery that was made during a survey of chromospherically active late-type stars using an automated telescope. It was given its variable star designation, BY Capricorni, in the year 2000. The star is an RS Canum Venaticorum variable, indicating the presence of an active chromosphere with star spots.

This is a double-lined close spectroscopic binary with an orbital period of 13.174 days and an eccentricity of 0.18. The binary nature of this system was discovered in 1918 by the English astronomer Joseph Lunt. It has a combined spectrum that matches a stellar classification of G1 IV, with the individual components having estimated classes of G1 V and G2 V. The system is a source of X-ray emission.
