= Tau2 Capricorni =

Star in the constellation Capricornus

Tau^{2} Capricorni
Observation data Epoch J2000.0 Equinox J2000.0 (ICRS)
- Constellation: Capricornus
- Right ascension: 20^{h} 39^{m} 16.31779^{s}
- Declination: −14° 57′ 17.1352″
- Apparent magnitude (V): 5.20 (5.77 + 9.5 + 6.19)

Characteristics
- Spectral type: B6III + ? + B6IV

Astrometry
Radial velocity (R_{v})	−4.1±2.1 km/s
Proper motion (μ)	RA: +2.62 mas/yr Dec.: −19.46 mas/yr
Parallax (π)	2.87±0.65 mas
Distance	approx. 1,100 ly (approx. 350 pc)

Orbit
Primary	τ^{2} Cap A
Name	τ^{2} Cap B
Period (P)	420 yr
Semi-major axis (a)	0.48″
Eccentricity (e)	0.73
Inclination (i)	75°
Longitude of the node (Ω)	93.0°
Periastron epoch (T)	1915.0
Argument of periastron (ω) (secondary)	270°

Details

A
Mass	5.01±0.35 M_{☉}
Luminosity (bolometric)	1,893 L_{☉}
Surface gravity (log g)	3.90 cgs
Temperature	15,439 K
Metallicity [Fe/H]	0.14 dex
Rotational velocity (v sin i)	170 km/s

Other designations
- τ^{2} Cap, 14 Capricorni, BD−15°5743, GC 28748, HD 196662, HIP 101923, HR 7889, SAO 163771, ADS 14099, CCDM J20392-1457, WDS J20393-1457

Database references
SIMBAD	data

Tau^{2} Capricorni is a triple star system in the constellation Capricornus. Its name is a Bayer designation that is Latinized from τ^{2} Capricorni, and abbreviated Tau^{2} Cap or τ^{2} Cap. This system is located at a distance of approximately 1,100 light years from Earth based on parallax. It has a blue-white hue and a combined apparent visual magnitude of +5.20. Because it is positioned near the ecliptic, τ^{2} Capricorni can be occulted by the Moon.

The primary, component A, is a B-type giant with a stellar classification of B6III and an apparent magnitude of +5.8. It has five times the mass of the Sun and is spinning rapidly with a projected rotational velocity of 170 km/s. The star is radiating 1,893 times the luminosity of the Sun from its photosphere at an effective temperature of 15,439 K.

At an angular separation of only 0.34 arcseconds is the companion, component B, a B-type subgiant star with a class of B6IV and an apparent magnitude of +6.3. These two stars orbit around their common centre of mass once every 420 years. A possible third component with an apparent magnitude of +9.5, detected by studying the star during occultation, is located 0.052 arcseconds away from the A component.
