= Psi Capricorni =

Star in the constellation Capricornus

- Location of ψ Capricorni (circled)

Observation data Epoch J2000 Equinox ICRS
- Constellation: Capricornus
- Right ascension: 20^{h} 46^{m} 05.733^{s}
- Declination: −25° 16′ 15.23″
- Apparent magnitude (V): 4.13

Characteristics
- Evolutionary stage: main sequence
- Spectral type: F5 V
- U−B color index: −0.03
- B−V color index: +0.42

Astrometry
Radial velocity (R_{v})	+20.3 km/s
Proper motion (μ)	RA: −52.557 mas/yr Dec.: −156.935 mas/yr
Parallax (π)	68.3370±0.1823 mas
Distance	47.7 ± 0.1 ly (14.63 ± 0.04 pc)
Absolute magnitude (M_{V})	3.33

Details
Mass	1.35+0.12 −0.07 M_{☉}
Radius	1.49±0.03 R_{☉}
Luminosity	3.77+0.18 −0.20 L_{☉}
Surface gravity (log g)	4.25 cgs
Temperature	6,589+56 −50 K
Metallicity [Fe/H]	0.15 dex
Rotational velocity (v sin i)	40.9±2.0 km/s
Age	2.34+0.36 −0.97 Gyr

Other designations
- ψ Cap, 16 Capricorni, CD−25°15018, FK5 779, GC 28929, GJ 805, HD 197692, HIP 102485, HR 7936, SAO 189664, PLX 4947.00

Database references
SIMBAD	data

Psi Capricorni is a single, yellow-white hued star in the southern zodiac constellation of Capricornus. Its name is a Bayer designation that is Latinized from ψ Capricorni, and abbreviated Psi Cap or ψ Cap. This star is faintly visible to the naked eye with an apparent visual magnitude of +4.13. The distance to this star is approximately 47.7 light-years (14.6 pc) based on parallax measurements, and it is drifting further away with a radial velocity of +20 km/s. The closest approach to the Sun occurred some 467,000 years ago at a separation of 20 light-years.

This object is an F-type main-sequence star with a stellar classification of F5 V. It is 2.3 billion years old with 1.35 times the mass of the Sun. The measured rotational velocity of this star is approximately 41 km/s (the Sun has an equatorial rotation velocity of 2 km/s). Analysis of the line profile of the star's spectrum indicates that it is undergoing differential rotation, with the variation by latitude being similar to the Sun. The star has 1.49 times the Sun's radius and is radiating 3.77 times the luminosity of the Sun from its photosphere at an effective temperature of 6,589 K. It displays an infrared excess, suggesting the presence of an orbiting debris disk at a separation of 38.75 AU and a temperature of 60 K.

== Chinese name ==
In Chinese, 天田 (Tiān Tián), meaning Celestial Farmland, refers to an asterism consisting of ψ Capricorni, ω Capricorni, 3 Piscis Austrini, and 24 Capricorni. Consequently, the Chinese name for ω Capricorni itself is 天田四 (Tiān Tián sì, English: the Fourth Star of Celestial Farmland).

In R. H. Allen's version, this star represented the battle-axe Yue.
