= HD 192310 =

Star in the constellation Capricornus

- Location of HD 192310 (circled)

Observation data Epoch J2000 Equinox ICRS
- Constellation: Capricornus
- Right ascension: 20^{h} 15^{m} 17.39138^{s}
- Declination: −27° 01′ 58.7116″
- Apparent magnitude (V): 5.73

Characteristics
- Evolutionary stage: main sequence
- Spectral type: K2+ V
- U−B color index: 0.64
- B−V color index: 0.88
- Variable type: Suspected

Astrometry
Radial velocity (R_{v})	−54.41±0.13 km/s
Proper motion (μ)	RA: +1242.763 mas/yr Dec.: −181.175 mas/yr
Parallax (π)	113.4872±0.0516 mas
Distance	28.74 ± 0.01 ly (8.812 ± 0.004 pc)
Absolute magnitude (M_{V})	6.0

Details
Mass	0.83+0.07 −0.01 M_{☉}
Radius	0.83±0.02 R_{☉}
Luminosity	0.42+0.03 −0.02 L_{☉}
Surface gravity (log g)	4.38±0.19 cgs
Temperature	5108+61 −60 K
Metallicity [Fe/H]	−0.01±0.05 dex
Rotation	47.7±4.9 days
Rotational velocity (v sin i)	<3 km/s
Age	7.5–8.9 Gyr

Other designations
- 5 G. Capricorni, CD−27°14659, GCTP 4804.00, Gl 785, HD 192310, HIP 99825, HR 7722, LHS 488, LTT 8009, NSV 12933, SAO 189065

Database references
SIMBAD	data
Exoplanet Archive	data
ARICNS	data

HD 192310 (also known as 5 G. Capricorni or Gliese 785) is a star in the southern constellation of Capricornus. It is located in the solar neighborhood at a distance of 28.7 light-years (8.8 parsecs), and is within the range of luminosity needed to be viewed from the Earth with the unaided eye. (According to the Bortle scale, it can be viewed from dark suburban skies.) HD 192310 is suspected of being a variable star, but this is unconfirmed.

== Description ==
This is a K-type main sequence star with a stellar classification of K2+ V. HD 192310 has 83% of the mass and radius of the Sun. The effective temperature of the photosphere is 5108 K, giving it the orange-hued glow of a K-type star. It is older than the Sun, with age estimates in the range 7.5–8.9 billion years. The proportion of elements other than hydrogen and helium, known as the metallicity, is similar to that of the Sun. It is spinning slowly, completing a rotation roughly every 48 days.

The space velocity components of this star are (U, V, W) = (–69, –13, –14) km/s. It is following an orbit through the Milky Way galaxy that has an orbital eccentricity of 0.18 at a mean galactocentric distance of 8.1 kpc. The star will achieve perihelion in around 82,200 years when it comes within 20.18 ly (6.188 pc) of the Sun.

== Planetary system ==
The system has a Neptune-mass planet "b", discovered in 2010. A second planet "c" was found in this system in 2011 by the HARPS GTO program, along with the now-doubtful HD 85512 b and the planets of 82 G. Eridani. The uncertainty in the mass of the second planet was much higher than for the first because of the lack of coverage around the full orbit. Both planets may be similar in composition to Neptune. They are orbiting along the inner and outer edges of the habitable zone for this star.

A study in 2023 updated the parameters of these two planets, and identified a number of additional radial velocity signals. While most of these signals were attributed to stellar activity, one was considered a planet candidate. If real, this third planet would be a super-Earth orbiting closer to the star than the two known planets. However, another 2023 study did not find this candidate signal and also attributed it to stellar activity.

The HD 192310 planetary system
Companion (in order from star)	Mass	Semimajor axis (AU)	Orbital period (days)	Eccentricity	Inclination (°)	Radius
b	≥16.1±0.7 M_{🜨}	0.32±0.01	74.25±0.04	0.11±0.02	—	—
c	≥15.9±0.9 M_{🜨}	1.21±0.02	534.9+5.9 −5.1	0.06+0.05 −0.04	—	—

== See also ==
- List of star systems within 25–30 light-years
- List of nearest K-type stars
