= Omega Capricorni =

Star in the constellation Capricornus

- Location of ω Capricorni (circled)

Observation data Epoch J2000.0 Equinox J2000.0 (ICRS)
- Constellation: Capricornus
- Right ascension: 20^{h} 51^{m} 49.291^{s}
- Declination: −26° 55′ 08.89″
- Apparent magnitude (V): +4.11

Characteristics
- Evolutionary stage: horizontal branch
- Spectral type: K4 III
- U−B color index: +1.93
- B−V color index: +1.64
- Variable type: Suspected

Astrometry
Radial velocity (R_{v})	+9.1±1.4 km/s
Proper motion (μ)	RA: −9.016 mas/yr Dec.: −2.048 mas/yr
Parallax (π)	5.8975±0.3064 mas
Distance	550 ± 30 ly (170 ± 9 pc)
Absolute magnitude (M_{V})	−2.7

Details
Mass	7.60+0.40 −0.04 M_{☉}
Radius	93.2+4.9 −3.8 R_{☉}
Luminosity	3,194+344 −278 L_{☉}
Surface gravity (log g)	0.84+0.15 −0.02 cgs
Temperature	4,474+79 −13 K
Metallicity [Fe/H]	−0.24 dex
Rotational velocity (v sin i)	4.68 km/s
Age	48.1±8.3 Myr

Other designations
- ω Cap, 18 Cap, CD−27°15082, FK5 1546, HD 198542, HIP 102978, HR 7980, SAO 189781

Database references
SIMBAD	data

Omega Capricorni, is an orange-hued star in the southern constellation Capricornus, near the southern constellation border with Microscopium. Its name is a Bayer designation that is Latinized from ω Capricorni, and abbreviated Omega Cap or ω Cap. This star is faintly visible to the naked eye, having an apparent visual magnitude of +4.11. Based upon an annual parallax shift of 5.9 mas as seen from the Earth, it is located approximately 550 light-years (170 pc) distant from the Sun. It is a candidate member of the Ursa Major Moving Group and has a relatively high peculiar velocity of 25.7±1.9 km/s, making it is a possible runaway star.

In Chinese, 天田 (Tiān Tián), meaning Celestial Farmland, refers to an asterism consisting of ω Capricorni, 3 Piscis Austrini, 24 Capricorni and ψ Capricorni. Consequently, the Chinese name for ω Capricorni itself is 天田二 (Tiān Tián èr, English: the First Star of Celestial Farmland.)

This is an evolved K-type giant star with a stellar classification of K4 III, and is a suspected variable. With the supply of hydrogen at its core exhausted, the star has expanded to about 93 times the radius of the Sun. It is 48 million years old with 7.6 times the mass of the Sun. Omega Capricorni is radiating 3,194 times the luminosity of the Sun from its bloated photosphere at an effective temperature of 4,474 K. It is a barium star, showing an overabundance of the s-process elements. This suggests that Omega Capricorni has an orbiting white dwarf companion.
