= Iota Capricorni =

Star in the constellation Capricornus

- Location of ι Capricorni (circled)

Observation data Epoch J2000.0 Equinox J2000.0 (ICRS)
- Constellation: Capricornus
- Right ascension: 21^{h} 22^{m} 14.79598^{s}
- Declination: −16° 50′ 04.3580″
- Apparent magnitude (V): +4.296

Characteristics
- Evolutionary stage: horizontal branch
- Spectral type: G8 III
- U−B color index: +0.63
- B−V color index: +0.89
- Variable type: BY Dra

Astrometry
| Radial velocity (R_{v}) | +12.31±0.13 km/s |
| Proper motion (μ) | RA: 29.403±0.189 mas/yr Dec.: 4.909±0.123 mas/yr |
| Parallax (π) | 16.2048±0.1688 mas |
| Distance | 201 ± 2 ly (61.7 ± 0.6 pc) |
| Absolute magnitude (M_{V}) | +0.18 |

Details
| Mass | 2.89±0.08 M_{☉} |
| Radius | 10.67±0.62 R_{☉} |
| Luminosity | 83 L_{☉} |
| Surface gravity (log g) | 3.05±0.10 cgs |
| Temperature | 5,200±28 K |
| Metallicity [Fe/H] | 0.05±0.05 dex |
| Rotation | 68 d |
| Rotational velocity (v sin i) | 4.37±0.45 km/s |
| Age | 390 Myr |

Other designations
- ι Cap, 32 Cap, BD−17°6245, FK5 1561, HD 203387, HIP 105515, HR 8167, SAO 164346

Database references
| SIMBAD | data |

Iota Capricorni is a solitary, yellow-hued star in the southern constellation of Capricornus. It name is a Bayer designation that is Latinized from ι Capricorni, and abbreviated Iota Cap or ι Cap. This star can be seen with the naked eye, having an apparent visual magnitude of +4.3. It is positioned near the ecliptic and thus is subject to lunar occultation.

Based upon an annual parallax shift of 16.2 mas as seen from the Earth, the star is located about 201 light-years (62 pc) from the Sun. At that distance, the visual magnitude of the star is diminished by an extinction factor of 0.08 due to interstellar dust. It is drifting further away with a line of sight velocity of +12 km/s.

== Chinese name ==
In Chinese, 十二國 (Shíer Guó), meaning Twelve States, refers to an asterism which represents twelve ancient states in the Spring and Autumn period and the Warring States period, consisting of ι Capricorni, φ Capricorni, 38 Capricorni, 35 Capricorni, 36 Capricorni, χ Capricorni, θ Capricorni, 30 Capricorni, 33 Capricorni, ζ Capricorni, 19 Capricorni, 26 Capricorni, 27 Capricorni, 20 Capricorni, η Capricorni and 21 Capricorni. Consequently, the Chinese name for ι Capricorni itself is 代一 (Dài yī, English: the First Star of Dai), meaning that this star (together with 37 Capricorni) represents the state Dai (or Tae)(代).

== Properties ==
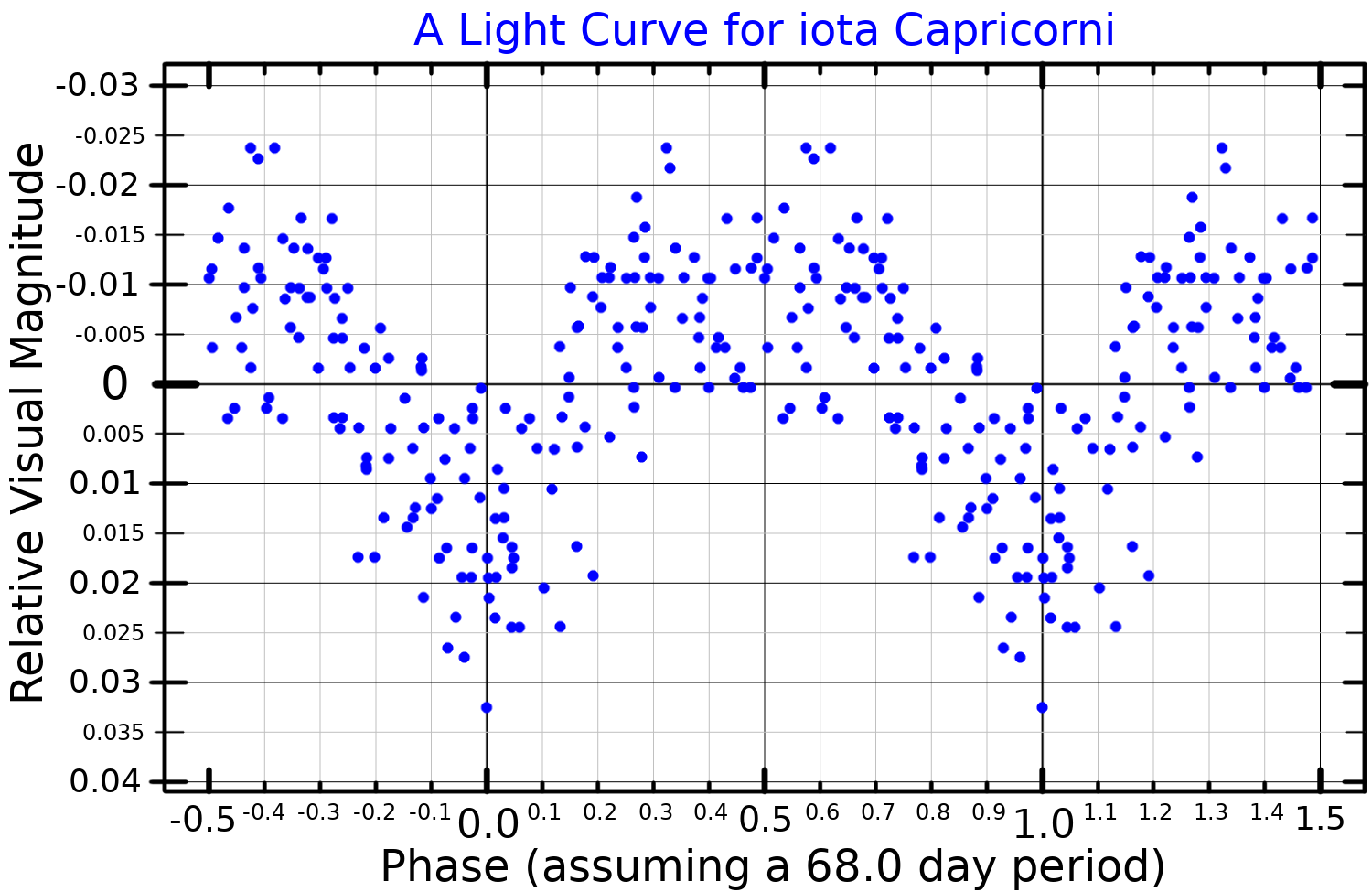
A visual band light curve for iota Capricorni, adapted from Henry et al. (1995)

This is an evolved G-type giant star with a stellar classification of G8 III. It is classified as a BY Draconis type variable star. This is a chromospherically-active star with a longitudinal magnetic field strength of 8.3±0.6 G and an X-ray luminosity of 4.482×10^{30} erg s^{−1}. The activity and photometric variation of the star allow an estimate of its rotation period as 68 days.

Iota Capricorni has an estimated 2.9 times the mass of the Sun and nearly 11 times the Solar radius. It is 390 million years old and is radiating 83 times the solar luminosity from its chromosphere at an effective temperature of 5,200 K.

On 31 January 2034, it will be occulted by Venus over a small part of Siberia, Mongolia and China.

== Planetary system ==
In 2022, two exoplanets, both super-Jovian in mass, were discovered in orbit around Iota Capricorni using a combination of radial velocity and astrometry. The inner planet has a highly eccentric orbit.

The Iota Capricorni planetary system
| Companion (in order from star) | Mass | Semimajor axis (AU) | Orbital period (years) | Eccentricity | Inclination (°) | Radius |
|---|---|---|---|---|---|---|
| b | ≥3.480+0.589 −0.531 M_{J} | 1.771+0.056 −0.062 | 1.403+0.021 −0.022 | 0.732±0.049 | — | — |
| c | 7.485+3.395 −2.210 M_{J} | 5.067+0.204 −0.196 | 6.793+0.260 −0.226 | 0.202+0.125 −0.101 | 158.462+6.927 −9.058 | — |
