= HD 192310 b =

Extrasolar planet in the constellation Capricornus

Discovery
- Discovery site: La Silla Observatory
- Detection method: Radial velocity (HARPS)

Orbital characteristics
- Semi-major axis: 0.32 AU
- Eccentricity: 0.13
- Orbital period (sidereal): 74.7 d
- Star: HD 192310

Physical characteristics
- Mean radius: 0.381 R_{J}
- Mass: 16.9 M_{🜨}
- Temperature: 355 K

HD 192310 b is an exoplanet orbiting the star HD 192310 (HR 7722). It orbits its parent star with a semimajor axis of 0.32 ± 0.005 AU, an eccentricity of 0.13 ± 0.04. and an orbital period of 74.72 days.

The Neptune-sized planet has at least 21 times the mass of Earth and 3 to 4 times its diameter.

HD 192310 b was discovered on 1 November 2010 and lies within the inner edge of the habitable zone of HD 192310.

== See also ==
- List of star systems within 25–30 light-years
