= Phi Capricorni =

Star in the constellation Capricornus

- Location of φ Capricorni (circled)

Observation data Epoch J2000.0 Equinox J2000.0 (ICRS)
- Constellation: Capricornus
- Right ascension: 21^{h} 15^{m} 37.900^{s}
- Declination: −20° 39′ 06.10″
- Apparent magnitude (V): +5.16

Characteristics
- Evolutionary stage: horizontal branch (86%)
- Spectral type: K0 II-III
- B−V color index: +1.15

Astrometry
Radial velocity (R_{v})	−4.5±0.5 km/s
Proper motion (μ)	RA: +13.850 mas/yr Dec.: −2.682 mas/yr
Parallax (π)	4.8754±0.1154 mas
Distance	670 ± 20 ly (205 ± 5 pc)
Absolute magnitude (M_{V})	−1.16±0.107

Details
Mass	2.63 M_{☉}
Radius	35 R_{☉}
Luminosity	447 L_{☉}
Surface gravity (log g)	1.77 cgs
Temperature	4,490±25 K
Metallicity [Fe/H]	−0.15 dex
Rotational velocity (v sin i)	3.8 km/s
Age	1.24 Gyr

Other designations
- φ Cap, 28 Cap, BD−21°5974, HD 202320, HIP 104963, HR 8127, SAO 190173

Database references
SIMBAD	data

Phi Capricorni is a solitary star in the southern constellation of Capricornus. Its name is a Bayer designation that is Latinized from φ Capricorni, and abbreviated Phi Cap or φ Cap. This star is visible to the naked eye with an apparent visual magnitude of +5.16. Based upon an annual parallax shift of 5.07 mas as seen from the Earth, the star is located approximately 670 light years from the Sun, give or take 20 light years. Because of its proximity to the ecliptic, it is subject to lunar occultation.

This is an evolved, orange-hued K-type giant/bright giant star with a stellar classification of K0 II-III It shows an infrared excess, which may be due to leftover material from a mass-loss event. The star has an estimated 2.63 times the mass of the Sun, and radiates 447 times the solar luminosity from its photosphere at an effective temperature of 4,490 K. Phi Capricorni is around 1.24 billion years old and is spinning with a projected rotational velocity of 3.8 km/s.

== Chinese Name ==
In Chinese, 十二國 (Shíer Guó), meaning Twelve States, refers to an asterism which is represent twelve ancient states in the Spring and Autumn period and the Warring States period, consisting of φ Capricorni, ι Capricorni, 38 Capricorni, 35 Capricorni, 36 Capricorni, χ Capricorni, θ Capricorni, 30 Capricorni, 33 Capricorni, ζ Capricorni, 19 Capricorni, 26 Capricorni, 27 Capricorni, 20 Capricorni, η Capricorni and 21 Capricorni. Consequently, the Chinese name for φ Capricorni itself represents the state Chu (楚), together with ε Ophiuchi in Right Wall of Heavenly Market Enclosure (asterism).

R. H. Allen had the opinion that φ Capricorni, together with χ Capricorni, represented the state Wei (魏).
