= Zeta Capricorni =

Star in the constellation Capricornus

- Location of ζ Capricorni (circled)

Observation data Epoch J2000 Equinox J2000
- Constellation: Capricornus
- Right ascension: 21^{h} 26^{m} 40.02634^{s}
- Declination: −22° 24′ 40.8042″
- Apparent magnitude (V): 3.77

Characteristics
- Spectral type: G4Ib: Ba2 + DA2.2
- U−B color index: +0.57
- B−V color index: +0.99
- Variable type: Suspected eclipsing binary

Astrometry
| Radial velocity (R_{v}) | +2.1±0.1 km/s |
| Proper motion (μ) | RA: −2.23 mas/yr Dec.: 18.10 mas/yr |
| Parallax (π) | 8.46±0.21 mas |
| Distance | 386 ± 10 ly (118 ± 3 pc) |
| Absolute magnitude (M_{V}) | −1.59 |

Orbit
| Period (P) | 2,367±9 d |
| Semi-major axis (a) | 6.0±0.4 AU |
| Eccentricity (e) | 0.26±0.05 |
| Inclination (i) | 133±5° |
| Longitude of the node (Ω) | 9±165° |
| Periastron epoch (T) | 2,455,474±109 HJD |
| Argument of periastron (ω) (primary) | 255±15° |

Details

A
| Mass | 4.5+0.3 −0.2 M_{☉} |
| Radius | ~29 R_{☉} |
| Luminosity | 561+180 −143 L_{☉} |
| Surface gravity (log g) | 1.7±0.3 cgs |
| Temperature | 5,269±53 K |
| Metallicity [Fe/H] | −0.09 dex |

B
| Mass | 0.67±0.10 M_{☉} |
| Temperature | 23,000 K |

Other designations
- ζ Cap, 34 Cap, NSV 25596, CD−22°15388, GC 30020, HD 204075, HIP 105881, HR 8204, SAO 190341, CCDM J21267-2225AB, WDS J21267-2225AB, WD 2123-226

Database references
| SIMBAD | data |

Zeta Capricorni is a binary star system in the southern constellation of Capricornus. Its name is a Bayer designation that is Latinized from ζ Capricorni, and abbreviated Zeta Cap or ζ Cap. This star is visible to the naked eye with an apparent visual magnitude of 3.77. The system is located at a distance of approximately 386 light-years from the Sun based on parallax. It is drifting further away with a radial velocity of +2 km/s. The absolute magnitude of this system is −1.59.

== Properties ==
The binary nature of this system was announced in 1980 by Erika Böhm-Vitense based on an ultraviolet excess attributed to a white dwarf companion. It is a single-lined spectroscopic binary system with an orbital period of 6.5 years and an eccentricity (ovalness) is 0.25. It was flagged as a suspected eclipsing binary in 1988 due to observed variations in the light curve.

The primary, designated component A, has a stellar classification of G4Ib: Ba2. This notation indicates this is a yellow-hued supergiant star, although the ':' means there is some uncertainty about the class. The temperature and surface gravity of this object suggest it may be a horizontal-branch star. It is considered a prototypical example of a Barium star, as indicated by the 'Ba2' class suffix. The properties of these objects include overabundances of carbon molecules (such as C_{2}) and s-process elements. Zeta Capricorni has an overabundance of the s-process element praseodymium.

Its companion, component B, is a carbon-oxygen white dwarf with a hydrogen-rich atmosphere and a class of DA2.2. It is about two-thirds as massive as the Sun, and its temperature is 23,000 K. In the course of its evolution, the progenitor star passed through the thermally pulsing asymptotic giant branch, during which the enlarged atmosphere transferred material to the primary. The abundance of niobium in the primary's atmosphere, a product of the decay of zirconium-93, is at a level that suggests the transfer to the primary took place more than three million years ago.

A magnitude 12.5 visual companion was discovered by T. J. J. See in 1897. As of 1997, it was located at an angular separation of 17.30″ along a position angle of 12°.

== Chinese name ==
In Chinese, 十二國 (Shíer Guó), meaning Twelve States, refers to an asterism which represents twelve ancient states in the Spring and Autumn period and the Warring States period, consisting of ζ Capricorni, φ Capricorni, ι Capricorni, 38 Capricorni, 35 Capricorni, 36 Capricorni, χ Capricorni, θ Capricorni, 30 Capricorni, 33 Capricorni, 19 Capricorni, 26 Capricorni, 27 Capricorni, 20 Capricorni, η Capricorni and 21 Capricorni. Consequently, the Chinese name for ζ Capricorni itself represents the state of Yan (燕), together with ν Ophiuchi in Left Wall of Heavenly Market Enclosure (asterism).
