= Lambda Capricorni =

A-type main sequenece star in the constellation Capricornus

- Location of λ Capricorni (circled)

Observation data Epoch J2000.0 Equinox J2000.0 (ICRS)
- Constellation: Capricornus
- Right ascension: 21^{h} 46^{m} 32.097^{s}
- Declination: −11° 21′ 57.44″
- Apparent magnitude (V): +5.56

Characteristics
- Evolutionary stage: main sequence
- Spectral type: A1 V
- B−V color index: −0.01

Astrometry
Radial velocity (R_{v})	−2.32±0.51 km/s
Proper motion (μ)	RA: +29.007 mas/yr Dec.: −9.420 mas/yr
Parallax (π)	12.0253±0.0711 mas
Distance	271 ± 2 ly (83.2 ± 0.5 pc)
Absolute magnitude (M_{V})	+0.89

Details
Mass	2.50±0.04 M_{☉}
Radius	2.21±0.05 R_{☉}
Luminosity	48.89^{+0.8}_{−0.7} L_{☉}
Surface gravity (log g)	3.99^{+0.02}_{−0.01} cgs
Temperature	10,247^{+51}_{−42} K
Rotational velocity (v sin i)	192.5±5.7 km/s
Age	271±64 Myr

Other designations
- λ Cap, 48 Cap, BD−12°6087, FK5 818, HD 207052, HIP 107517, HR 8319, SAO 164639

Database references
SIMBAD	data

Lambda Capricorni is a solitary star in the southern constellation of Capricornus. Its name is a Bayer designation that is Latinized from λ Capricorni, and abbreviated Lambda Cap or λ Cap. This star is faintly visible to the naked eye with an apparent visual magnitude of +5.56. Based upon an annual parallax shift of 11.58 mas as seen from the Earth, the star is located 271 light-years (83 pc) from the Sun. At that distance, the visual magnitude is diminished by an extinction factor of 0.11 due to interstellar dust. It is drifting closer with a line of sight velocity of −2 km/s. This star is subject to lunar occultations because of its position near the ecliptic.

This is a white-hued A-type main sequence star with a stellar classification of A1 V. It has been listed as a magnetic Ap star, indicating the spectrum displays chemically peculiar features. However, its status as a true Ap star is disputed. The star has an estimated 2.50 times the mass of the Sun and about 2.21 times the Sun's radius. It is 271 million years old and is spinning rapidly with a projected rotational velocity of 192.5 km/s. Lambda Capricorni is radiating 49 times the Sun's luminosity from its photosphere at an effective temperature of 10,247 K.

This star is a member of the HSC 396 cluster of stars, which was discovered in 2023.
