= Sigma Capricorni =

Star in the constellation Capricornus

- Location of σ Capricorni (circled)

Observation data Epoch J2000.0 Equinox J2000.0 (ICRS)
- Constellation: Capricornus
- Right ascension: 20^{h} 19^{m} 23.604^{s}
- Declination: −19° 07′ 06.69″
- Apparent magnitude (V): +5.31

Characteristics
- Spectral type: K2 III
- U−B color index: +1.56
- B−V color index: +1.43

Astrometry
Radial velocity (R_{v})	−9.64±0.16 km/s
Proper motion (μ)	RA: +5.034 mas/yr Dec.: −10.825 mas/yr
Parallax (π)	3.4448±0.0987 mas
Distance	950 ± 30 ly (290 ± 8 pc)
Absolute magnitude (M_{V})	−2.38

Details
Mass	6.3±0.7 M_{☉}
Radius	67.5+4.2 −6.0 R_{☉}
Luminosity	1,392±64 L_{☉}
Temperature	4,292+204 −127 K
Age	60.5±17.2 Myr

Other designations
- σ Cap, CD−19°5776, FK5 3625, HD 193150, HIP 100195, HR 7761, SAO 163445, WDS J20194-1907A

Database references
SIMBAD	data

Sigma Capricorni is a solitary, orange-hued star in the southern constellation of Capricornus, 0.5 degree north of the ecliptic. Its name is a Bayer designation that is Latinized from σ Capricorni, and abbreviated Sigma Cap or σ Cap. This star is visible to the naked eye as a dim, orange-hued star with an apparent visual magnitude of +5.31. The star is about 950 ly (290 pc) 1,070 light years away from the Sun based on parallax, but is drifting closer with a radial velocity of −9.6 km/s.

This is an evolved, K-type giant star with a stellar classification of K2 III. Having exhausted the supply of hydrogen at its core, it has expanded and now has around 67.5 times the girth of the Sun. The star is about 60.5 million years old with 6.3 times the mass of the Sun. It is radiating 1,392 times the luminosity of the Sun from its swollen photosphere at an effective temperature of 4,292 K.

A magnitude 9.43 visual companion is at an angular separation of 55.90″ along a position angle of 179°, as of 2016.
