= Upsilon Capricorni =

Star in the constellation Capricornus

- Location of υ Capricorni (circled)

Observation data Epoch J2000.0 Equinox J2000.0 (ICRS)
- Constellation: Capricornus
- Right ascension: 20^{h} 40^{m} 02.944^{s}
- Declination: −18° 08′ 19.17″
- Apparent magnitude (V): 5.17

Characteristics
- Evolutionary stage: asymptotic giant branch
- Spectral type: M1 III
- B−V color index: +1.65

Astrometry
Radial velocity (R_{v})	−12.3±1.6 km/s
Proper motion (μ)	RA: −22.764 mas/yr Dec.: −22.170 mas/yr
Parallax (π)	5.1719±0.1354 mas
Distance	630 ± 20 ly (193 ± 5 pc)
Absolute magnitude (M_{V})	−1.09

Details
Radius	92±4 R_{☉}
Luminosity	1,283.0±76.5 L_{☉}
Temperature	3,953+427 −193 K
Metallicity [Fe/H]	−0.08 dex

Other designations
- υ Cap, 15 Capricorni, NSV 25208, BD−18°5738, FK5 773, HD 196777, HIP 101984, HR 7900, SAO 163779

Database references
SIMBAD	data

Upsilon Capricorni is a solitary, reddish hued star in the southern constellation of Capricornus. Its name is a Bayer designation that is Latinized from υ Capricorni, and abbreviated Upsilon Cap or υ Cap. This star is dimly visible to the naked eye with an apparent visual magnitude of 5.17. The star is about 630 light years away based on parallax, but is drifting closer with a radial velocity of −12 km/s. It is 0.22 degree north of the ecliptic, so is subject to lunar occultations.

This is an aging red giant star on the asymptotic giant branch with a stellar classification of M1 III, a star that has exhausted the supply of hydrogen at its core then cooled and expanded. It has 92 times the radius of the Sun and is radiating 1,283 times the luminosity of the Sun from its swollen photosphere at an effective temperature of 3,953 K.

It is a suspected variable star of unknown type with a brightness that has been measured ranging from a peak of 5.19 down to 5.24.
