= Tau1 Capricorni =

Star in the constellation Capricornus

τ^{1} Capricorni
Observation data Epoch J2000.0 Equinox ICRS
- Constellation: Capricornus
- Right ascension: 20^{h} 37^{m} 21.20^{s}
- Declination: −15° 08′ 50.4″
- Apparent magnitude (V): +6.76

Characteristics
- Evolutionary stage: red giant branch
- Spectral type: K1 III
- U−B color index: +1.23
- B−V color index: +1.26

Astrometry
Radial velocity (R_{v})	18.5±3 km/s
Proper motion (μ)	RA: 61.508 mas/yr Dec.: −47.081 mas/yr
Parallax (π)	4.3504±0.0229 mas
Distance	750 ± 4 ly (230 ± 1 pc)
Absolute magnitude (M_{V})	−0.27

Details
Mass	3.40^{+0.40}_{−0.04} M_{☉}
Radius	21.4±0.5 R_{☉}
Luminosity	191^{+5}_{−3} L_{☉}
Surface gravity (log g)	2.16^{+0.04}_{−0.01} cgs
Temperature	4,626^{+57}_{−7} K
Metallicity [Fe/H]	−0.13 dex
Age	270^{+25}_{−70} Myr

Other designations
- τ^{1} Cap, 13 Capricorni, 34 G. Capricorni, BD−15°5732, GC 28694, HD 196348, HIP 101751, SAO 163740

Database references
SIMBAD	data

Tau^{1} Capricorni is a star in the constellation Capricornus. Its identifier is a Bayer designation that is Latinized from τ^{1} Capricorni, and abbreviated Tau^{1} Cap or τ^{1} Cap. This star has an apparent magnitude of 6.76, making it readily visible in binoculars, but not to the naked eye. Located approximately 750 light years from Earth, the star is receding with a heliocentric radial velocity of 18.5 km/s. Due to its location near the ecliptic, τ^{1} Cap can be occulted by the Moon and rarely planets.

τ^{1} Capricorni has a stellar classification of K1 III, indicating that it is an ageing K-type giant. At a modelled age of 270 million years, it has 3.4 times the mass of the Sun and an enlarged radius of 21 solar radii. It shines at 191 times the luminosity of the Sun from its photosphere at an effective temperature of 4,626 K. τ^{1} Cap's metallicity – elements heavier than helium – is at solar level.
