= 24 Capricorni =

Star in the southern constellation of Capricornus

- Location of 24 Capricorni (circled in red)

Observation data Epoch J2000 Equinox J2000
- Constellation: Capricornus
- Right ascension: 21^{h} 07^{m} 07.66733^{s}
- Declination: −25° 00′ 21.0790″
- Apparent magnitude (V): +4.49

Characteristics
- Evolutionary stage: AGB
- Spectral type: M1− III
- B−V color index: 1.604±0.005

Astrometry
Radial velocity (R_{v})	+32.1±0.8 km/s
Proper motion (μ)	RA: −28.09 mas/yr Dec.: −44.14 mas/yr
Parallax (π)	7.15±0.22 mas
Distance	460 ± 10 ly (140 ± 4 pc)
Absolute magnitude (M_{V})	−1.24

Details
Radius	54.06+1.88 −2.72 R_{☉}
Luminosity	611±41 L_{☉}
Temperature	3,903+102 −66 K

Other designations
- A Capricorni, 24 Cap, CD−25°15235, FK5 791, GC 29490, HD 200914, HIP 104234, HR 8080, SAO 190025, ADS 14632, CCDM J21071-2500

Database references
SIMBAD	data

24 Capricorni or A Capricorni is a single star in the southern constellation of Capricornus. This object is visible to the naked eye as a faint, red-hued star with an apparent visual magnitude of +4.49. It is approximately 460 light years from the Sun, based on parallax. The star is moving further from the Earth with a heliocentric radial velocity of +32 km/s.

This is an aging red giant, currently on the asymptotic giant branch, with a stellar classification of M1− III; a star that has exhausted the supply of hydrogen at its core and expanded to 54 times the Sun's radius. It is radiating 611 times the Sun's luminosity from its enlarged photosphere at an effective temperature of 3,903 K.

== Chinese name ==
In R. H. Allen's book, this star is described as having the Chinese name Tsoo, representing the state of Chu, though other sources identify φ Capricorni as Chu. Bayer described it as one of the last three stars of the tail of the goat, although this is not how they appear in modern visual representations of the constellation.
