= Capricornus =

Zodiac constellation in the southern hemisphere

- Constellation
- List of stars in Capricornus
- Abbreviation: Cap
- Genitive: Capricorni
- Pronunciation: /ˌkæprɪˈkɔːrnəs/, genitive /ˌkæprɪˈkɔːrnaɪ/
- Symbolism: the Sea-Goat
- Right ascension: 20^{h} 06^{m} 46.4871^{s}–21^{h} 59^{m} 04.8693^{s}
- Declination: −8.4043999°–−27.6914144°
- Area: 414 sq. deg. (40th)
- Main stars: 9, 13, 23
- Bayer/Flamsteed stars: 49
- Stars brighter than 3.00^{m}: 1
- Stars within 10.00 pc (32.62 ly): 3
- Brightest star: δ Cap (Deneb Algedi) (2.85^{m})
- Nearest star: LP 816-60
- Messier objects: 1
- Meteor showers: Alpha Capricornids; Chi Capricornids; Sigma Capricornids; Tau Capricornids; Capricornids-Sagittariids
- Bordering constellations: Aquarius; Aquila; Sagittarius; Microscopium; Piscis Austrinus
- Visible at latitudes between +62° and −90°. Best visible at 21:00 (9 p.m.) during the month of September.

Capricornus is one of the constellations of the zodiac. Its name is Latin for "horned goat" or "goat horn" or "having horns like a goat's", and it is commonly represented in the form of a sea goat: a mythical creature that is half goat, half fish.

Capricornus is one of the 88 modern constellations, and was also one of the 48 constellations listed by the 2nd century astronomer Claudius Ptolemy. Its traditional astrological symbol is (♑︎). Under its modern boundaries it is bordered by Aquila, Sagittarius, Microscopium, Piscis Austrinus, and Aquarius. The constellation is located in an area of sky called the Sea or the Water, consisting of many water-related constellations such as Aquarius, Pisces and Eridanus. It is the smallest constellation in the zodiac, though not the smallest of the 88 IAU designated constellations.

== Features ==
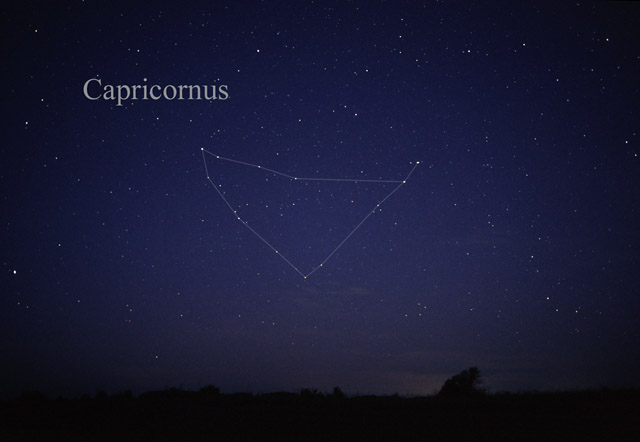
The constellation Capricornus as it can be seen with the naked eye

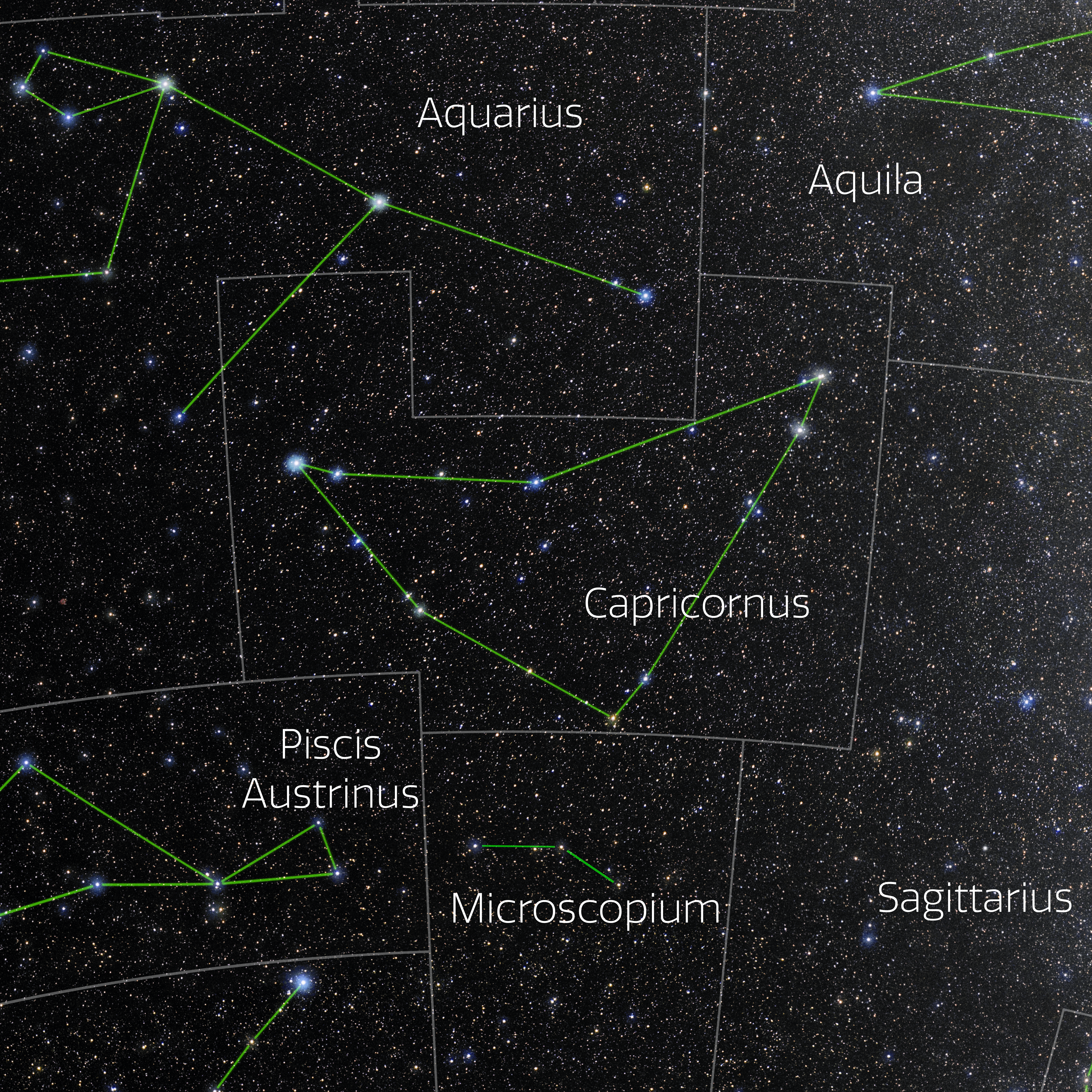
The constellation Capricornus showing the IAU boundaries, the constellation stick figure, and labels for its brightest stars. Astrophotograph by Eckhard Slawik, from NOIRLab's 88 Constellations project.

=== Stars ===
Capricornus is a faint constellation, with only one star above magnitude 3; its alpha star has a magnitude of only 3.6.

The brightest star in Capricornus is δ Capricorni, also called Deneb Algedi, with a magnitude of 2.9, located 39 light-years from Earth. Like several other stars such as Denebola and Deneb, it is named from the Arabic word for "tail" (deneb) and “young goat / kid” (al-gedi), meaning "the tail of the goat". Deneb Algedi is a Beta Lyrae variable star (a type of eclipsing binary). It ranges by about 0.2 magnitudes with a period of 24.5 hours.

The other bright stars in Capricornus range in magnitude from 3.1 to 5.1. α Capricorni is a multiple star. The primary (α^{2} Cap), 109 light-years from Earth, is a yellow-hued giant star of magnitude 3.6; the secondary (α^{1} Cap), 690 light-years from Earth, is a yellow-hued supergiant star of magnitude 4.3. The two stars are distinguishable by the naked eye, and both are themselves multiple stars. α^{1} Capricorni is accompanied by a star of magnitude 9.2; α^{2} Capricorni is accompanied by a star of magnitude 11.0; this faint star is itself a binary star with two components of magnitude 11. Also called Algedi or Giedi, the traditional names of α Capricorni come from the Arabic word for "the kid", which references the constellation's mythology.

β Capricorni is a double star also known as Dabih. It is a yellow-hued giant star of magnitude 3.1, 340 light-years from Earth. The secondary is a blue-white hued star of magnitude 6.1. The two stars are distinguishable in binoculars. β Capricorni's traditional name comes from the Arabic phrase for "the lucky stars of the slaughterer," a reference to ritual sacrifices performed by ancient Arabs at the heliacal rising of Capricornus. Another star visible to the naked eye is γ Capricorni, sometimes called Nashira ("bringing good tidings"); it is a white-hued giant star of magnitude 3.7, 139 light-years from Earth. π Capricorni is a double star with a blue-white hued primary of magnitude 5.1 and a white-hued secondary of magnitude 8.3. It is 670 light-years from Earth and the components are distinguishable in a small telescope.

=== Deep-sky objects ===
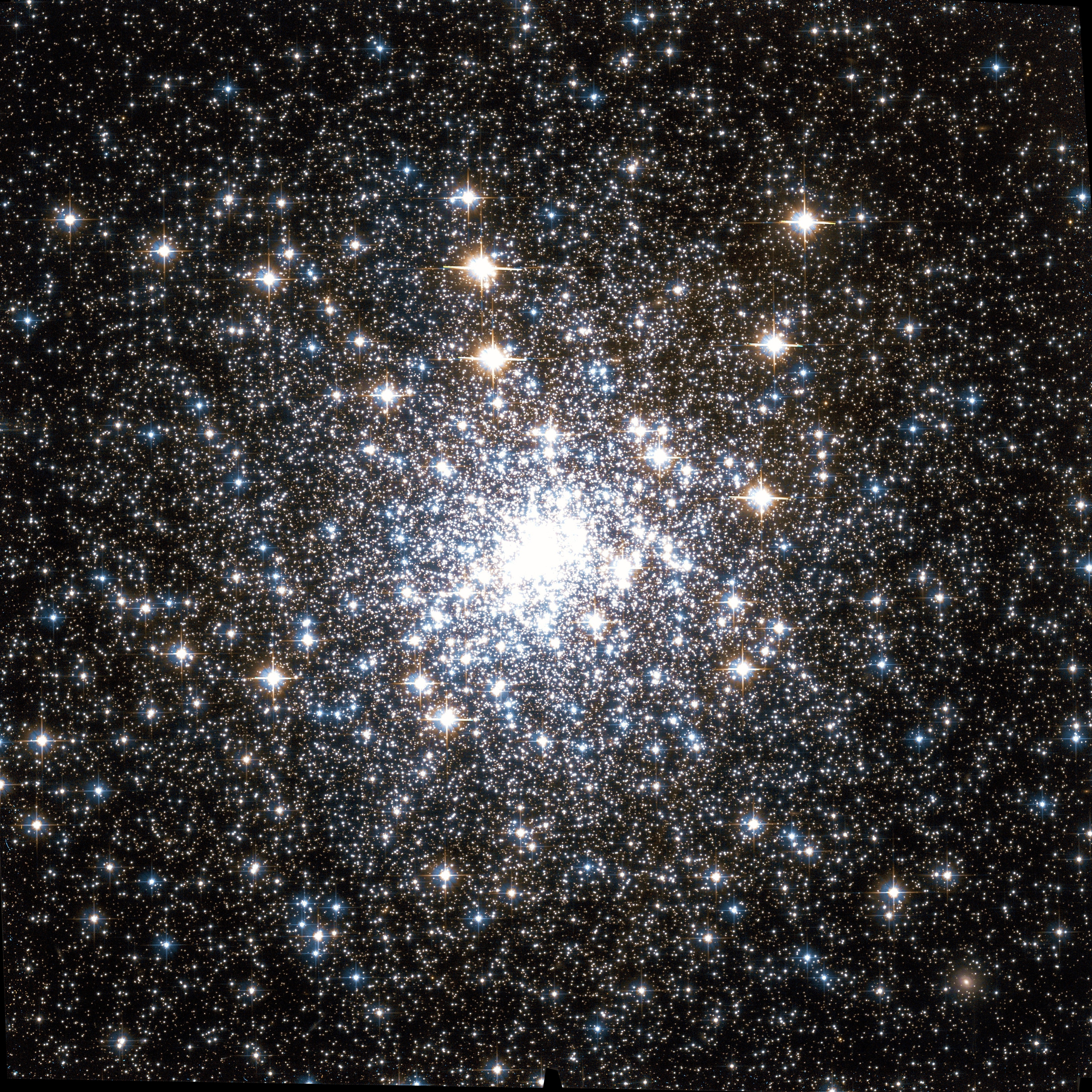
The globular cluster Messier 30 imaged by the Hubble Space Telescope

Several galaxies and star clusters are contained within Capricornus. Messier 30 is a globular cluster located 1 degree south of the galaxy group that contains NGC 7103. The constellation also harbors the wide spiral galaxy NGC 6907.

Messier 30 (NGC 7099) is a centrally-condensed globular cluster of magnitude 7.5 . At a distance of 30,000 light-years, it has chains of stars extending to the north that are resolvable in small amateur telescopes.

One galaxy group located in Capricornus is HCG 87, a group of at least three galaxies located 400 million light-years from Earth (redshift 0.0296). It contains a large elliptical galaxy, a face-on spiral galaxy, and an edge-on spiral galaxy. The face-on spiral galaxy is experiencing abnormally high rates of star formation, indicating that it is interacting with one or both members of the group. Furthermore, the large elliptical galaxy and the edge-on spiral galaxy, both of which have active nuclei, are connected by a stream of stars and dust, indicating that they too are interacting. Astronomers predict that the three galaxies may merge millions of years in the future to form a giant elliptical galaxy.

== History ==
The constellation was first attested in depictions on a cylinder-seal from around the 21st century BCE, it was explicitly recorded in the Babylonian star catalogues before 1000 BCE. In the Early Bronze Age the winter solstice occurred in the constellation, but due to the precession of the equinoxes, the December solstice now takes place in the constellation Sagittarius. The Sun is now in the constellation Capricorn (as distinct from the astrological sign) from late January through mid-February.

Although the solstice during the northern hemisphere's winter no longer takes place while the sun is in the constellation Capricornus, as it did until 130 BCE, the astrological sign called Capricorn is still used to denote the position of the solstice, and the latitude of the sun's most southerly position continues to be called the Tropic of Capricorn, a term which also applies to the line on the Earth at which the sun is directly overhead at local noon on the day of the December solstice.

The planet Neptune was discovered by German astronomer Johann Galle, near Deneb Algedi (δ Capricorni) on 23 September 1846, as Capricornus can be seen best from Europe at 4:00am in September (although, by modern constellation boundaries established in the early 20th century CE, Neptune lay within the confines of Aquarius at the time of its discovery).

== Mythology ==
Despite its faintness, the constellation Capricornus has one of the oldest mythological associations, having been consistently represented as a hybrid of a goat and a fish since the Middle Bronze Age, when the Babylonians used ^{MUL}SUḪUR.MAŠ "The Goat-Fish" as a symbol of their god Ea.

In Greek mythology, the constellation is sometimes identified as Amalthea, the goat that suckled the infant Zeus after his mother, Rhea, saved him from being devoured by his father, Cronos. Amalthea's broken horn was transformed into the cornucopia or "horn of plenty".

Capricornus is also sometimes identified as Pan, the god with a goat's horns and legs, who saved himself from the monster Typhon by giving himself a fish's tail and diving into a river.

== Visualizations ==
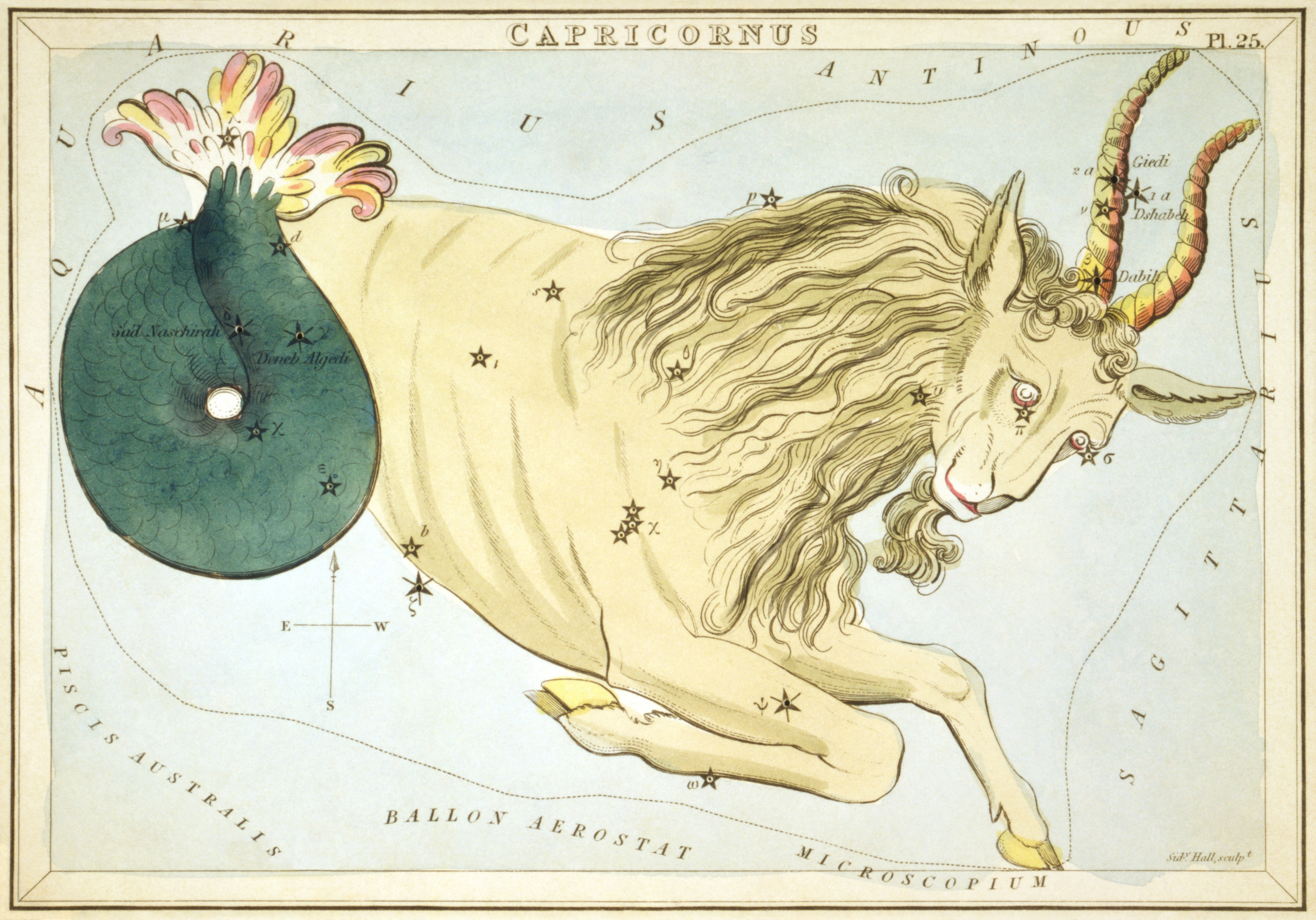
Capricornus as a sea-goat from Urania's Mirror (1825)

Capricornus's brighter stars are found on a triangle whose vertices are α^{2} Capricorni (Giedi), δ Capricorni (Deneb Algiedi), and ω Capricorni. Ptolemy's method of connecting the stars of Capricornus has been influential. Capricornus is usually drawn as a goat with the tail of a fish.

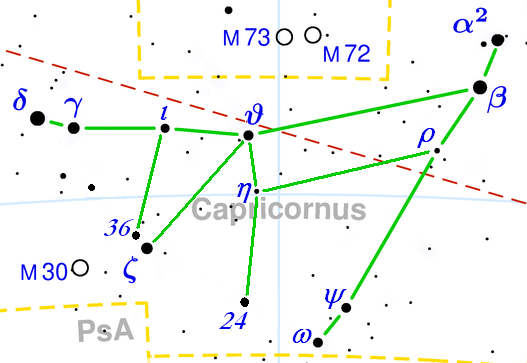
Diagram of H.A. Rey's alternative way to connect the stars of the Capricornus constellation

H. A. Rey has suggested an alternative visualization, which graphically shows a goat. The goat's head is formed by the triangle of stars ι Cap, θ Cap, and ζ Cap. The goat's horn sticks out with stars γ Cap and δ Cap. Star δ Cap, at the tip of the horn, is of the third magnitude. The goat's tail consists of stars β Cap and α^{2} Cap: star β Cap being of the third magnitude. The goat's hind foot consists of stars ψ Cap and ω Cap. Both of these stars are of the fourth magnitude.

== Equivalents ==
In Chinese astronomy, constellation Capricornus lies in The Black Tortoise of the North (北方玄武; Běi Fāng Xuán Wǔ).

The Nakh peoples called this constellation Roofing Towers (Chechen: Neģara Bjovnaš).

In the Society Islands, the figure of Capricornus was called Rua-o-Mere, "Cavern of parental yearnings".

In Indian astronomy and Indian astrology, it is called Makara, the crocodile.

== See also ==
- Capricornus in Chinese astronomy
- Hippocampus (mythology), the mythological sea horse
- IC 1337, galaxy

== Citations ==
Citations

References

- Makemson, Maud Worcester (1941). The Morning Star Rises: an account of Polynesian astronomy. Yale University Press. Bibcode:1941msra.book.....M.
- Rey, H. A. (1997), The Stars — A New Way To See Them, Houghton Mifflin, ISBN 0-395-24830-2
- Ridpath, Ian; Tirion, Wil (2001), Stars and Planets Guide, Princeton University Press, ISBN 0-691-08913-2
- Ridpath, Ian; Tirion, Wil (2007), Stars and Planets Guide, Princeton University Press, ISBN 978-0-691-13556-4
- Wilkins, Jamie; Dunn, Robert (2006), 300 Astronomical Objects: A Visual Reference to the Universe (1st ed.), Firefly Books, ISBN 978-1-55407-175-3
