= List of nearest stars =

Animated 3D map of the nearest stars, centered on the Sun. 3D red green glasses are recommended to view this image correctly.

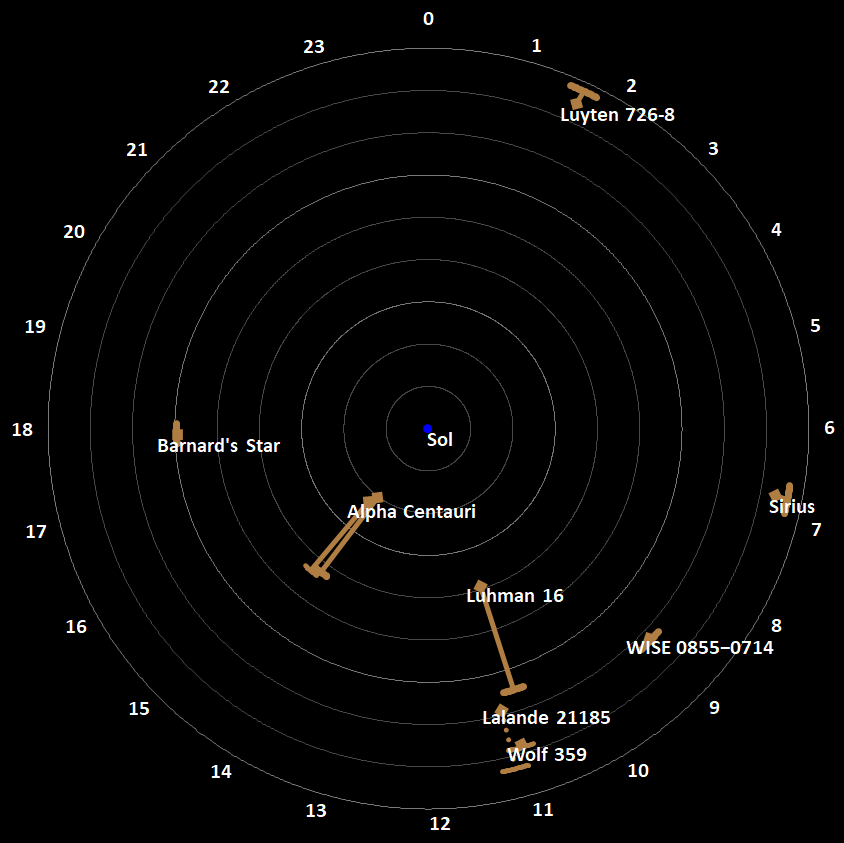
A radar map of all known stellar and substellar objects within 9 light years (ly), arranged clockwise in hours of right ascension, and marked by distance (▬) and position (◆). Distances are marked outward from the Sun (Sol), with concentric circles indicating the distance in one ly steps. Positions are marked inward from their distance markings, connected by lines according to their declinations (dotted when positive), representing the arcs of the declinations viewed edge-on.

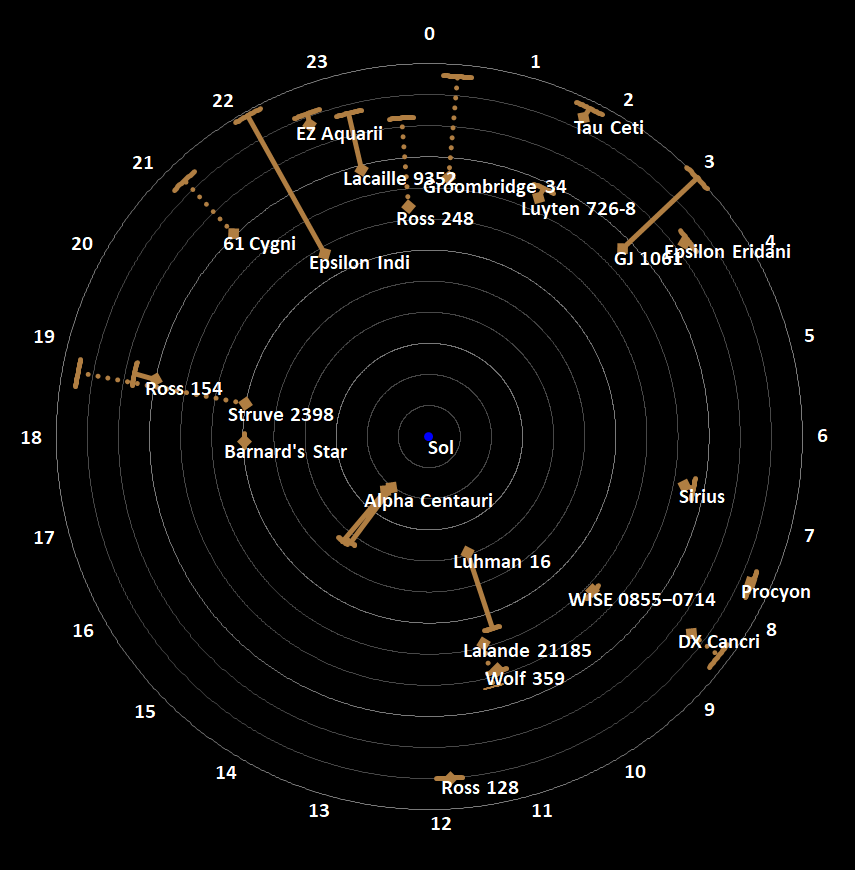
A radar map of all known stellar and substellar objects within 12 light years (ly), arranged clockwise in hours of right ascension, and marked by distance (▬) and position (◆). Distances are marked outward from the Sun (Sol), with concentric circles indicating the distance in one ly steps. Positions are marked inward from their distance markings, connected by lines according to their declinations (dotted when positive), representing the arcs of the declinations viewed edge-on.

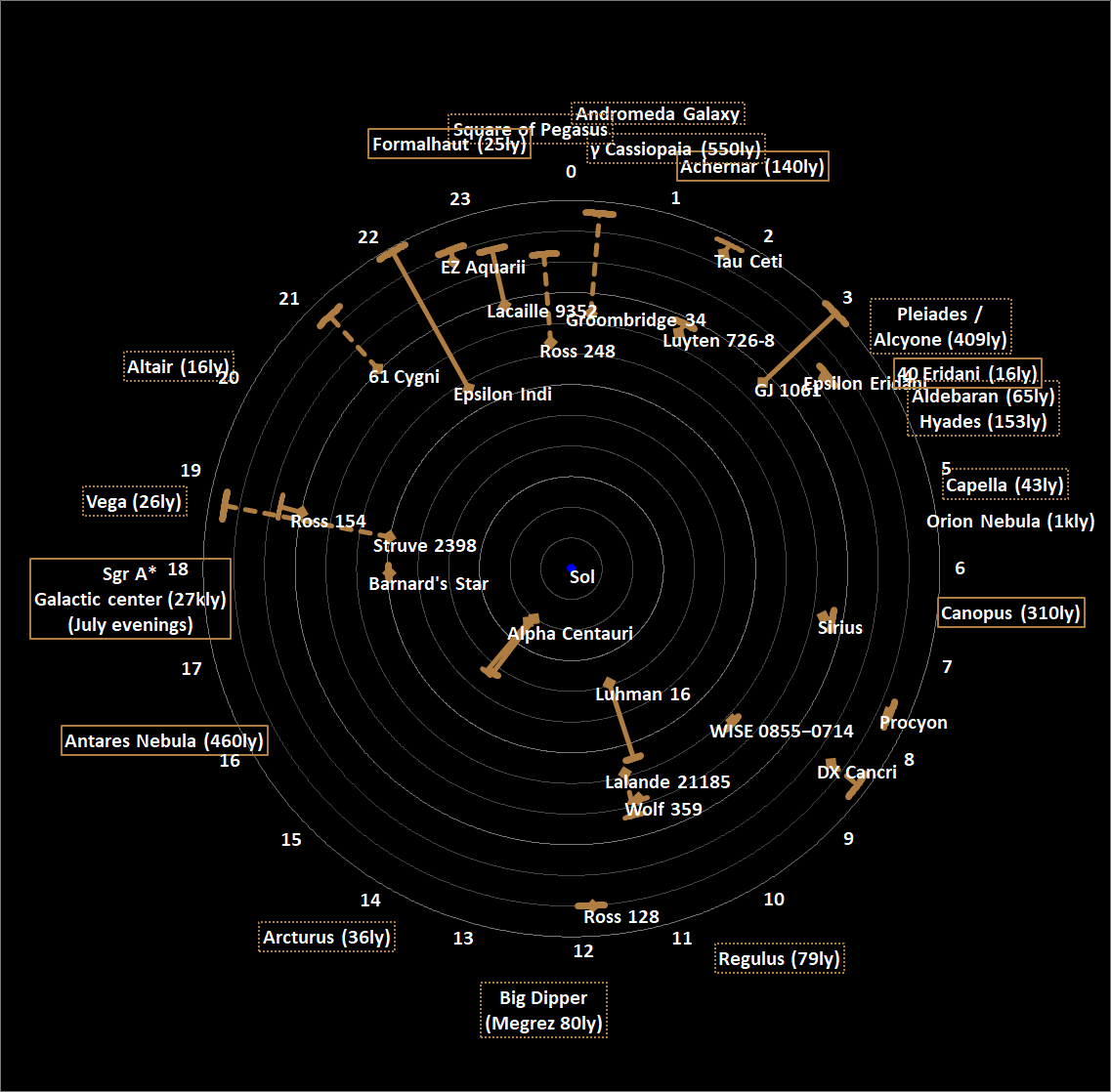
A radar map of all known stellar and substellar objects within 12 light years (ly), arranged clockwise in hours of right ascension, and marked by distance (▬) and position (◆). Distances are marked outward from the Sun (Sol), with concentric circles indicating the distance in one ly steps. Positions are marked inward from their distance markings, connected by lines according to their declinations (dotted when positive), representing the arcs of the declinations viewed edge-on.

This list covers all known stars, white dwarfs, brown dwarfs, and sub-brown dwarfs/rogue planets within 20 light-years (6.13 parsecs) of the Sun. So far, 133 such objects have been found. Only 22 are bright enough to be visible without a telescope, for which the star's visible light needs to reach or exceed the dimmest brightness visible to the naked eye from Earth, which is typically around 6.5 apparent magnitude.

The known 133 objects are bound in 95 stellar systems. Of those, 103 are main sequence stars: 78 red dwarfs and 25 "typical" stars having greater mass. Additionally, astronomers have found 6 white dwarfs (stars that have exhausted all fusible hydrogen), 20 brown dwarfs, as well as 4 sub-brown dwarfs. The closest system is Alpha Centauri, with Proxima Centauri as the closest star in that system, at 4.2465 light-years from Earth. The brightest, most massive and most luminous object among those 131 is Sirius A, which is also the brightest star in Earth's night sky; its white dwarf companion Sirius B is the hottest object among them. The largest object within 20 light-years is Procyon.

The Solar System, and the other stars/dwarfs listed here, are currently moving within (or near) the Local Interstellar Cloud, roughly 30 light-years (9.2 pc) across. The Local Interstellar Cloud is, in turn, contained inside the Local Bubble, a cavity in the interstellar medium about 300 light-years (92.0 pc) across. It contains Ursa Major and the Hyades star cluster, among others. The Local Bubble also contains the neighboring G-Cloud, which contains the stars Alpha Centauri and Altair. In the galactic context, the Local Bubble is a small part of the Orion Arm, which contains most stars that we can see without a telescope. The Orion Arm is one of the spiral arms of our Milky Way galaxy.

== Astrometrics ==
The easiest way to determine stellar distance to the Sun for objects at these distances is parallax, which measures how much stars appear to move against background objects over the course of Earth's orbit around the Sun. As a parsec (parallax-second) is defined by the distance of an object that would appear to move exactly one second of arc against background objects, stars less than 5 parsecs away will have measured parallaxes of over 0.2 arcseconds, or 200 milliarcseconds. Determining past and future positions relies on accurate astrometric measurements of their parallax and total proper motions (how far they move across the sky due to their actual velocity relative to the Sun), along with spectroscopically determined radial velocities (their speed directly towards or away from us, which combined with proper motion defines their true movement through the sky relative to the Sun). Both of these measurements are subject to increasing and significant errors over very long time spans, especially over the several thousand-year time spans it takes for stars to noticeably move relative to each other.

Based on results from the Gaia telescope's second data release from April 2018, an estimated 694 stars will approach the Solar System to less than 5 parsecs in the next 15 million years. Of these, 26 have a good probability to come within 1.0 parsec (3.3 light-years) and another 7 within 0.5 parsecs (1.6 light-years). This number is likely much higher, due to the sheer number of stars needed to be surveyed; a star approaching the Solar System 10 million years ago, moving at a typical Sun-relative 20–200 kilometers per second, would be 600–6,000 light-years from the Sun at present day, with millions of stars closer to the Sun. The closest encounter to the Sun so far predicted is the low-mass orange dwarf star Gliese 710 / HIP 89825 with roughly 60% the mass of the Sun. It is currently predicted to pass 0.1696±0.0065 ly (10635±500 au) from the Sun in 1.290±0.04 million years from the present, close enough to significantly disturb the Solar System's Oort cloud.

Stars within 11 ly.

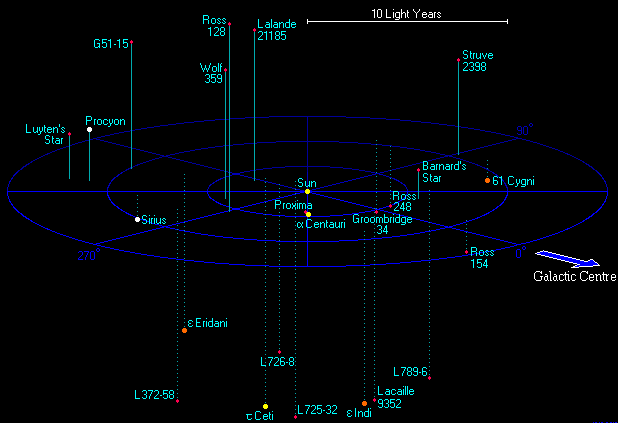
Stars and star systems within 12.5 ly.

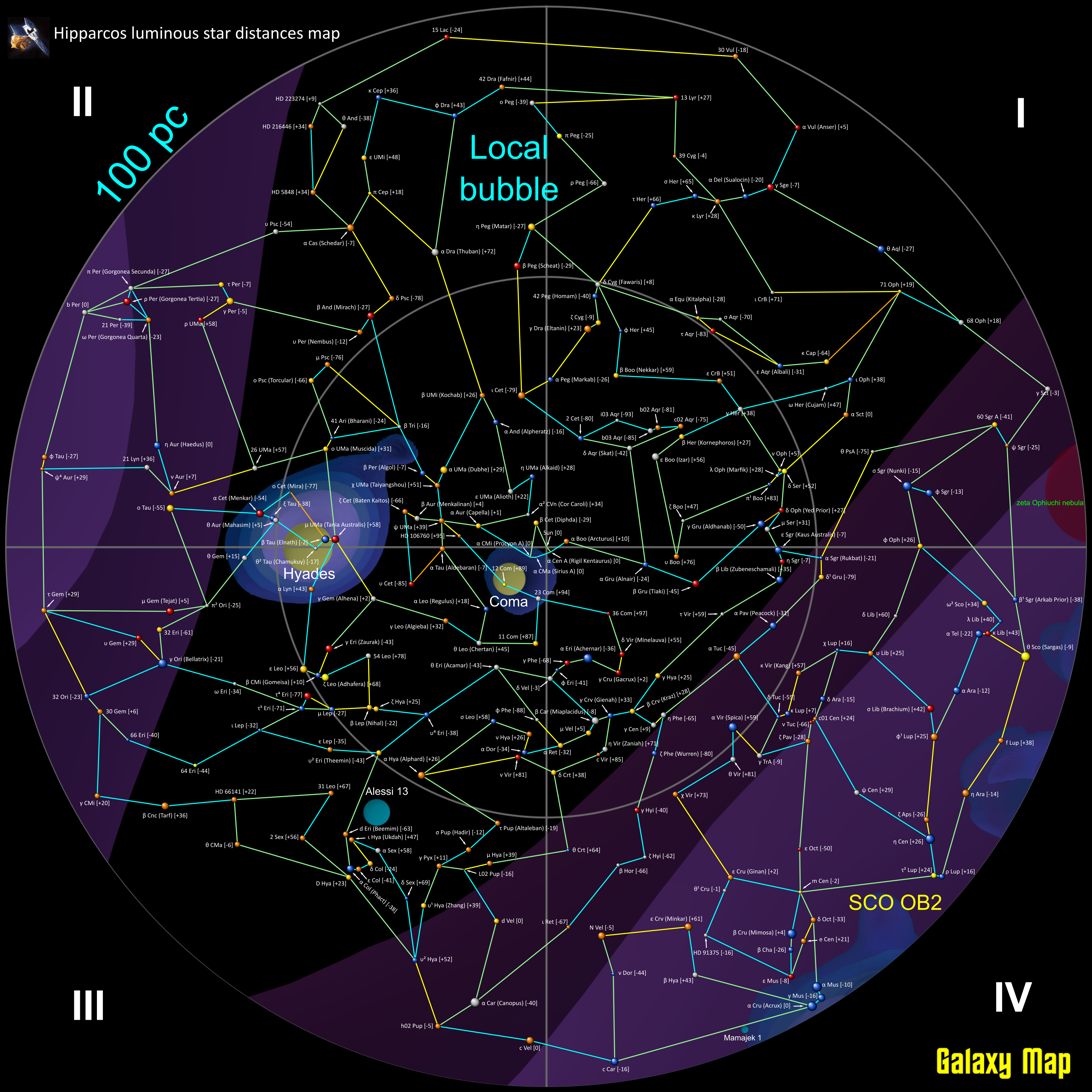
Hipparcos luminous stars distances map within 100 pc (330 ly). The number in square brackets is height above or below the galactic plane. The distance between stars is colour coded: < 25 pc: green < 50 pc: cyan < 75 pc: yellow < 100 pc: orange

== List ==
Key
| # | Visible to the unaided eye (apparent magnitude of +6.5 or brighter) |
| $ | Luminous star (absolute magnitude of +8.5 or brighter) |
| ‡ | White dwarf |
| § | Brown dwarf |
| & | Sub-brown dwarf or rogue planet |
| * | Nearest in constellation |

The classes of the stars and brown dwarfs are shown in the color of their spectral types (these colors are derived from conventional names for the spectral types and do not necessarily represent the star's observed color). Many brown dwarfs are not listed by visual magnitude but are listed by near-infrared J band apparent magnitude due to how dim (and often invisible) they are in visible color bands (U, B or V). Absolute magnitude (with electromagnetic wave, 'light' band denoted in subscript) is a measurement at a 10-parsec distance across imaginary empty space devoid of all its sparse dust and gas. Some of the parallaxes and resultant distances are rough measurements.

Known systems within 20 light-years (6.13 parsecs)
| Designation | | Distance (ly) | Cons. | RA/Dec (Ep. & Eq. J2000) | Stellar class | Mass (M_{☉}) | Magnitude (m_{V} or m_{J}) | | Parallax (Note: Parallaxes given by RECONS are a weighted mean of values in the sources given, as well as measurements by the RECONS program.) (mas) | Notes and additional references |
| System | Name | Distance (ly) | Cons. | RA/Dec (Ep. & Eq. J2000) | Stellar class | Mass (M_{☉}) | App. | Abs. | Parallax (mas) | Notes and additional references |
|---|---|---|---|---|---|---|---|---|---|---|
| Solar System | Sun (Sol)$ | 0.0000158 | N/A | N/A | G2V | 1 | −26.74# | 4.85 | N/A | 8 confirmed major planets (Mercury, Venus, Earth, Mars, Jupiter, Saturn, Uranus, and Neptune), at least 9 likely dwarf planets (Ceres, Pluto, Orcus, Gonggong, Haumea, Makemake, Quaoar, Eris, and Sedna), 2 asteroid belts and one possible candidate planet (Planet 9) |
| Alpha Centauri | Proxima Centauri (C, V645 Centauri) | 4.2465 ±0.0003 | Cen* | 14^{h} 29^{m} 43.0^{s} −62° 40′ 46″ | M5.5Ve | 0.122 | 11.09 | 15.53 | 768.0665 ±0.0499 | flare star, two confirmed planets (b, 2016 and d, 2025) and a candidate planet (c, 2019) |
| Alpha Centauri | Rigil Kentaurus (A)$ | 4.3441 ±0.0022 | Cen* | 14^{h} 39^{m} 36.5^{s} −60° 50′ 02″ | G2V | 1.079 | 0.01# | 4.38 | 750.81 ±0.38 | one directly imaged habitable-zone planet candidate (Alpha Centauri Ab) (2021) |
| Alpha Centauri | Toliman (B)$ | 4.3441 ±0.0022 | Cen* | 14^{h} 39^{m} 35.1^{s} −60° 50′ 14″ | K1V | 0.909 | 1.34# | 5.71 | 750.81 ±0.38 | planet b refuted in 2015 |
| Barnard's Star (BD+04°3561a) | | 5.9629 ±0.0004 | Oph* | 17^{h} 57^{m} 48.5^{s} +04° 41′ 36″ | M4.0Ve | 0.144 | 9.53 | 13.22 | 546.9759 ±0.0401 | flare star, largest-known proper motion, four confirmed planets (d, b, c, and e) |
| Luhman 16 (WISE 1049−5319) | A§ | 6.5102 ±0.0006 | Vel* | 10^{h} 49^{m} 18.9^{s} −53° 19′ 10″ | L8±1 | 0.032 | 10.7 J | 14.2 J | 500.993 ±0.050 | nearest brown dwarfs |
| Luhman 16 (WISE 1049−5319) | B§ | 6.5102 ±0.0006 | Vel* | 10^{h} 49^{m} 18.9^{s} −53° 19′ 10″ | T1±2 | 0.027 | | | 500.993 ±0.050 | nearest brown dwarfs |
| WISE 0855−0714& | | 7.430 ±0.041 | Hya* | 08^{h} 55^{m} 10.8^{s} −07° 14′ 43″ | Y4 | 0.003-0.010 | 25.0 J | 28.2 J | 439.0 ±2.4 | sub-brown dwarf |
| Wolf 359 (CN Leonis) | | 7.856 ±0.001 | Leo* | 10^{h} 56^{m} 29.2^{s} +07° 00′ 53″ | M6.0V | 0.090 | 13.44 | 16.55 | 415.1794 ±0.0684 | flare star, has 1 candidate & 1 refuted planet |
| Lalande 21185 (BD+36°2147, Gliese 411, HD 95735) | | 8.3044 ±0.0007 | UMa* | 11^{h} 03^{m} 20.2^{s} +35° 58′ 12″ | M2.0V | 0.390 | 7.47 | 10.44 | 392.7529 ±0.0321 | two known planets (2019, 2021) |
| Sirius (Alpha Canis Majoris) | A$ | 8.7094 ±0.0054 | CMa* | 06^{h} 45^{m} 08.9^{s} −16° 42′ 58″ | A1V | 2.063 | −1.46# | 1.42 | 374.4896 ±0.2313 | brightest star in the night sky |
| Sirius (Alpha Canis Majoris) | B‡ | 8.7094 ±0.0054 | CMa* | 06^{h} 45^{m} 08.9^{s} −16° 42′ 58″ | DA2 | 1.018 | 8.44 | 11.34 | 374.4896 ±0.2313 | brightest star in the night sky |
| Gliese 65 (Luyten 726–8) | A (BL Ceti) | 8.770 ±0.010 | Cet* | 01^{h} 39^{m} 01.3^{s} −17° 57′ 01″ | M5.5Ve | 0.102 | 12.54 | 15.40 | 371.92 ±0.42 | flare star (Archetypal member), has 1 candidate planet |
| Gliese 65 (Luyten 726–8) | B (UV Ceti) | 8.770 ±0.010 | Cet* | 01^{h} 39^{m} 01.3^{s} −17° 57′ 01″ | M6.0Ve | 0.100 | 12.99 | 15.85 | 371.92 ±0.42 | flare star (Archetypal member), has 1 candidate planet |
| Ross 154 (V1216 Sagittarii) | | 9.7063 ±0.0009 | Sgr* | 18^{h} 49^{m} 49.4^{s} −23° 50′ 10″ | M3.5Ve | 0.17 | 10.43 | 13.07 | 336.0266 ±0.0317 | flare star |
| Ross 248 (HH Andromedae) | | 10.3057 ±0.0014 | And* | 23^{h} 41^{m} 54.7^{s} +44° 10′ 30″ | M5.5Ve | 0.136 | 12.29 | 14.79 | 316.4812 ±0.0444 | flare star |
| Epsilon Eridani (Ran)$ | | 10.4749 ±0.0037 | Eri* | 03^{h} 32^{m} 55.8^{s} −09° 27′ 30″ | K2V | 0.820 | 3.73# | 6.19 | 311.37 ±0.11 | three circumstellar disks, one confirmed planet (AEgir, 2000) and one candidate (c, 2002) |
| Gliese 887 (Lacaille 9352) | | 10.7241 ±0.0007 | PsA* | 23^{h} 05^{m} 52.0^{s} −35° 51′ 11″ | M0.5V | 0.486 | 7.34 | 9.75 | 304.1354 ±0.0200 | flare star, four planets, b, c, d, and e with equivocal evidence for a fifth in the inner system as well as a possible outer giant. |
| Ross 128 (FI Virginis) | | 11.0074 ±0.0011 | Vir* | 11^{h} 47^{m} 44.4^{s} +00° 48′ 16″ | M4.0Vn | 0.168 | 11.13 | 13.51 | 296.3053 ±0.0302 | flare star, one planet (b) (2017) |
| EZ Aquarii (Gliese 866, Luyten 789-6) | A | 11.109 ±0.034 | Aqr* | 22^{h} 38^{m} 33.4^{s} −15° 17′ 57″ | M5.0Ve | 0.11 | 13.33 | 15.64 | 293.60 ±0.9 | A & B flare stars |
| EZ Aquarii (Gliese 866, Luyten 789-6) | B | 11.109 ±0.034 | Aqr* | 22^{h} 38^{m} 33.4^{s} −15° 17′ 57″ | M? | 0.11 | 13.27 | 15.58 | 293.60 ±0.9 | A & B flare stars |
| EZ Aquarii (Gliese 866, Luyten 789-6) | C | 11.109 ±0.034 | Aqr* | 22^{h} 38^{m} 33.4^{s} −15° 17′ 57″ | M? | 0.10 | 14.03 | 16.34 | 293.60 ±0.9 | A & B flare stars |
| 61 Cygni | A (BD+38°4343)$ | 11.4039 ±0.0012 | Cyg* | 21^{h} 06^{m} 53.9^{s} +38° 44′ 58″ | K5.0V | 0.70 | 5.21# | 7.49 | 286.0054 ±0.0289 | first star (besides Sun) to have its distance measured. B flare star, with a candidate super-Jupiter planet. Possible circumstellar disk. |
| 61 Cygni | B (BD+38°4344)$ | 11.4039 ±0.0012 | Cyg* | 21^{h} 06^{m} 55.3^{s} +38° 44′ 31″ | K7.0V | 0.63 | 6.03# | 8.31 | 286.0054 ±0.0289 | first star (besides Sun) to have its distance measured. B flare star, with a candidate super-Jupiter planet. Possible circumstellar disk. |
| Procyon (Alpha Canis Minoris) | A$ | 11.463 ±0.051 | CMi* | 07^{h} 39^{m} 18.1^{s} +05° 13′ 30″ | F5IV–V | 1.499 | 0.38# | 2.66 | 284.56 ±1.26 | |
| Procyon (Alpha Canis Minoris) | B‡ | 11.463 ±0.051 | CMi* | 07^{h} 39^{m} 18.1^{s} +05° 13′ 30″ | DQZ | 0.602 | 10.70 | 12.98 | 284.56 ±1.26 | |
| Struve 2398 (Gliese 725, BD+59°1915) | A (HD 173739) | 11.4908 ±0.0009 | Dra* | 18^{h} 42^{m} 46.7^{s} +59° 37′ 49″ | M3.0V | 0.334 | 8.90 | 11.16 | 283.8401 ±0.0220 | flare stars, star B has 1 confirmed and a candidate planet. |
| Struve 2398 (Gliese 725, BD+59°1915) | B (HD 173740) | 11.4908 ±0.0009 | Dra* | 18^{h} 42^{m} 46.9^{s} +59° 37′ 37″ | M3.5V | 0.248 | 9.69 | 11.95 | 283.8401 ±0.0220 | flare stars, star B has 1 confirmed and a candidate planet. |
| Groombridge 34 (Gliese 15) | A (GX Andromedae) | 11.6191 ±0.0008 | And | 00^{h} 18^{m} 22.9^{s} +44° 01′ 23″ | M1.5V | 0.38 | 8.08 | 10.32 | 280.7068 ±0.0203 | flare star, two known planets (Ab, 2014, and Ac, 2018) |
| Groombridge 34 (Gliese 15) | B (GQ Andromedae) | 11.6191 ±0.0008 | And | 00^{h} 18^{m} 22.9^{s} +44° 01′ 23″ | M3.5V | 0.15 | 11.06 | 13.30 | 280.7068 ±0.0203 | flare star |
| DX Cancri (G 51-15) | | 11.6797 ±0.0027 | Cnc* | 08^{h} 29^{m} 49.5^{s} +26° 46′ 37″ | M6.5Ve | 0.09 | 14.78 | 16.98 | 279.2496 ±0.0637 | flare star |
| Epsilon Indi (CPD−57°10015) | A$ | 11.8670 ±0.0041 | Ind* | 22^{h} 03^{m} 21.7^{s} −56° 47′ 10″ | K5Ve | 0.754 | 4.69# | 6.89 | 274.8431 ±0.0956 | one planet (Ab) (2018) |
| Epsilon Indi (CPD−57°10015) | Ba§ | 11.8670 ±0.0041 | Ind* | 22^{h} 04^{m} 10.5^{s} −56° 46′ 58″ | T1.0V | 0.065 | 12.3 J | 14.5 J | 274.8431 ±0.0956 | |
| Epsilon Indi (CPD−57°10015) | Bb§ | 11.8670 ±0.0041 | Ind* | 22^{h} 04^{m} 10.5^{s} −56° 46′ 58″ | T6.0V | 0.050 | 13.2 J | 15.4 J | 274.8431 ±0.0956 | |
| Tau Ceti (BD−16°295)$ | | 11.9118 ±0.0074 | Cet | 01^{h} 44^{m} 04.1^{s} −15° 56′ 15″ | G8.5Vp | 0.783 | 3.49# | 5.68 | 273.8097 ±0.1701 | debris disk, and evidence for four planets (e, f, g, and h) (2012, 2017), and further four suspected planets (b, c, d, and "i") (2012, 2019) |
| GJ 1061 (LHS 1565) | | 11.9839 ±0.0014 | Hor* | 03^{h} 35^{m} 59.7^{s} −44° 30′ 45″ | M5.5V | 0.113 | 13.09 | 15.26 | 272.1615 ±0.0316 | has 3 known planets (2019) |
| YZ Ceti (LHS 138) | | 12.1222 ±0.0015 | Cet | 01^{h} 12^{m} 30.6^{s} −16° 59′ 56″ | M4.5V | 0.130 | 12.02 | 14.17 | 269.0573 ±0.0337 | flare star, three planets (b, c, and d) (2017) |
| Luyten's Star (BD+05°1668) | | 12.3485 ±0.0019 | CMi | 07^{h} 27^{m} 24.5^{s} +05° 13′ 33″ | M3.5Vn | 0.26 | 9.86 | 11.97 | 264.1269 ±0.0413 | two planets (b, c) (2017) and two suspected planets (d, e) (2019) |
| Teegarden's Star (SO025300.5+165258) | | 12.4970 ±0.0045 | Ari* | 02^{h} 53^{m} 00.9^{s} +16° 52′ 53″ | M6.5V | 0.08 | 15.14 | 17.22 | 260.9884 ±0.0934 | has 3 known planets (2019, 2024) |
| Kapteyn's Star (CD−45°1841) | | 12.8308 ±0.0008 | Pic* | 05^{h} 11^{m} 40.6^{s} −45° 01′ 06″ | M1.5VI | 0.281 | 8.84 | 10.87 | 254.1986 ±0.0168 | two refuted planets (b and c) (2014) |
| Lacaille 8760 (AX Microscopii) | | 12.9472 ±0.0018 | Mic* | 21^{h} 17^{m} 15.3^{s} −38° 52′ 03″ | M0.0V | 0.60 | 6.67 | 8.69 | 251.9124 ±0.0352 | brightest M dwarf star in night sky, flare star |
| SCR 1845−6357 | A | 13.0638 ±0.0070 | Pav* | 18^{h} 45^{m} 05.3^{s} −63° 57′ 48″ | M8.5V | 0.07 | 17.39 | 19.41 | 249.6651 ±0.1330 | |
| SCR 1845−6357 | B§ | 13.0638 ±0.0070 | Pav* | 18^{h} 45^{m} 02.6^{s} −63° 57′ 52″ | T6 | 0.03 | 13.3 J | 15.3 J | 249.6651 ±0.1330 | |
| Kruger 60 (BD+56°2783) | A | 13.0724 ±0.0052 | Cep* | 22^{h} 27^{m} 59.5^{s} +57° 41′ 45″ | M3.0V | 0.271 | 9.79 | 11.76 | 249.5 ±0.1 | B flare star |
| Kruger 60 (BD+56°2783) | B (DO Cephei) | 13.0724 ±0.0052 | Cep* | 22^{h} 27^{m} 59.5^{s} +57° 41′ 45″ | M4.0V | 0.176 | 11.41 | 13.38 | 249.5 ±0.1 | B flare star |
| DENIS J1048−3956 | | 13.1932 ±0.0027 | Ant* | 10^{h} 48^{m} 14.7^{s} −39° 56′ 06″ | M8.5V | 0.08 | 17.39 | 19.37 | 247.2156 ±0.0512 | |
| Ross 614 (V577 Monocerotis, Gliese 234) | A (LHS 1849) | 13.363 ±0.040 | Mon* | 06^{h} 29^{m} 23.4^{s} −02° 48′ 50″ | M4.5V | 0.223 | 11.15 | 13.09 | 244.07 ±0.73 | A flare star |
| Ross 614 (V577 Monocerotis, Gliese 234) | B (LHS 1850) | 13.363 ±0.040 | Mon* | 06^{h} 29^{m} 23.4^{s} −02° 48′ 50″ | M5.5V | 0.111 | 14.23 | 16.17 | 244.07 ±0.73 | A flare star |
| UGPS J0722-0540& | | 13.43 ±0.13 | Mon | 07^{h} 22^{m} 27.3^{s} –05° 40′ 30″ | T9 | 0.010-0.025 | 16.52 J | 18.45 J | 242.8 ±2.4 | |
| Wolf 1061 (Gliese 628, BD−12°4523) | | 14.0500 ±0.0016 | Oph | 16^{h} 30^{m} 18.1^{s} −12° 39′ 45″ | M3.0V | 0.294 | 10.07 | 11.93 | 232.1390 ±0.0268 | three planets (b, c, and d) (2015) |
| Van Maanen's Star (Gliese 35, LHS 7)‡ | | 14.0718 ±0.0011 | Psc* | 00^{h} 49^{m} 09.9^{s} +05° 23′ 19″ | DZ7 | 0.67 | 12.38 | 14.21 | 231.7800 ±0.0183 | closest-known free-floating white dwarf, third-known white dwarf possible debris disk (1917) |
| Gliese 1 (CD−37°15492) | | 14.1747 ±0.0022 | Scl* | 00^{h} 05^{m} 24.4^{s} −37° 21′ 27″ | M1.5 V | 0.45-0.48 | 8.55 | 10.35 | 230.0970 ±0.0362 | |
| TZ Arietis (Gliese 83.1, L 1159–16) | | 14.5780 ±0.0046 | Ari | 02^{h} 00^{m} 13.2^{s} +13° 03′ 08″ | M4.5V | 0.14 | 12.27 | 14.03 | 223.7321 ±0.0699 | flare star, has one confirmed planet (b) |
| Wolf 424 (FL Virginis, LHS 333, Gliese 473) | A | 14.595 ±0.031 | Vir | 12^{h} 33^{m} 17.2^{s} +09° 01′ 15″ | M5.5Ve | 0.143 | 13.18 | 14.97 | 223.4775 ±0.4665 | flare stars |
| Wolf 424 (FL Virginis, LHS 333, Gliese 473) | B | 14.595 ±0.031 | Vir | 12^{h} 33^{m} 17.2^{s} +09° 01′ 15″ | M7Ve | 0.131 | 13.17 | 14.96 | 223.4775 ±0.4665 | flare stars |
| Gliese 687 (LHS 450, BD+68°946) | | 14.8395 ±0.0014 | Dra | 17^{h} 36^{m} 25.9^{s} +68° 20′ 21″ | M3.0V | 0.401 | 9.17 | 10.89 | 219.7898 ±0.0210 | possible flare star, two planets (b) (2014) and (c) (2020) |
| Gliese 674 (LHS 449) | | 14.8492 ±0.0018 | Ara* | 17^{h} 28^{m} 39.9^{s} −46° 53′ 43″ | M3.0V | 0.35 | 9.38 | 11.09 | 219.6463 ±0.0262 | one planet (b) (2007) |
| LHS 292 (LP 731-58) | | 14.8706 ±0.0041 | Sex* | 10^{h} 48^{m} 12.6^{s} −11° 20′ 14″ | M6.5V | 0.08 | 15.60 | 17.32 | 219.3302 ±0.0602 | flare star |
| Gliese 440 (WD 1142-645, LP 145–141)‡ | | 15.1226 ±0.0013 | Mus* | 11^{h} 45^{m} 42.9^{s} −64° 50′ 29″ | DQ6 | 0.75 | 11.50 | 13.18 | 215.6753 ±0.0181 | |
| GJ 1245 | A (G 208-44 A) | 15.2001 ±0.0034 | Cyg | 19^{h} 53^{m} 54.2^{s} +44° 24′ 55″ | M5.5V | 0.11 | 13.46 | 15.17 | 214.5745 ±0.0476 | flare stars |
| GJ 1245 | B (G 208-45) | 15.2001 ±0.0034 | Cyg | 19^{h} 53^{m} 55.2^{s} +44° 24′ 56″ | M6.0V | 0.10 | 14.01 | 15.72 | 214.5745 ±0.0476 | flare stars |
| GJ 1245 | C (G 208-44 B) | 15.2001 ±0.0034 | Cyg | 19^{h} 53^{m} 54.2^{s} +44° 24′ 55″ | M5.5 | 0.07 | 16.75 | 18.46 | 214.5745 ±0.0476 | flare stars |
| WISE 1741+2553§ | | 15.22 ±0.20 | Her* | 17^{h} 41^{m} 24.2^{s} +25° 53′ 19″ | T9 | | 16.53 J | 18.18 J | 214.3 ±2.8 | |
| Gliese 876 (Ross 780) | | 15.2382 ±0.0025 | Aqr | 22^{h} 53^{m} 16.7^{s} −14° 15′ 49″ | M3.5V | 0.37 | 10.17 | 11.81 | 214.0380 ±0.0356 | four planets (d (2005), c (2001), b (1998), and e (2010)) |
| WISE 1639−6847§ | | 15.336 ±0.066 | TrA* | 16^{h} 39^{m} 40.9^{s} −68° 47′ 46″ | Y0.5 | | 20.57 J | 22.10 J | 212.67 ±0.91 | |
| LHS 288 (Luyten 143-23) | | 15.7586 ±0.0034 | Car* | 10^{h} 44^{m} 21.2^{s} −61° 12′ 36″ | M5.5V | 0.11 | 13.90 | 15.51 | 206.9698 ±0.0448 | |
| GJ 1002 | | 15.8060 ±0.0036 | Cet | 00^{h} 06^{m} 43.8^{s} −07° 32′ 22″ | M5.5V | 0.11 | 13.76 | 15.40 | 206.3500 ±0.0474 | two known planets (b & c, 2022) |
| DENIS 0255−4700§ | | 15.877 ±0.014 | Eri | 02^{h} 55^{m} 03.7^{s} −47° 00′ 52″ | L7.5V | 0.025-0.065 | 22.92 | 24.44 | 205.4251 ±0.1857 | |
| Groombridge 1618 (Gliese 380)$ | | 15.8857 ±0.0017 | UMa | 10^{h} 11^{m} 22.1^{s} +49° 27′ 15″ | K7.0V | 0.67 | 6.59 | 8.16 | 205.3148 ±0.0224 | flare star, one suspected debris disk |
| Gliese 412 | A | 15.9969 ±0.0026 | UMa | 11^{h} 05^{m} 28.6^{s} +43° 31′ 36″ | M1.0V | 0.48 | 8.77 | 10.34 | 203.8876 ±0.0332 | |
| Gliese 412 | B (WX Ursae Majoris) | 15.9969 ±0.0026 | UMa | 11^{h} 05^{m} 30.4^{s} +43° 31′ 18″ | M5.5V | 0.10 | 14.48 | 16.05 | 203.8876 ±0.0332 | flare star |
| AD Leonis | | 16.1939 ±0.0024 | Leo | 10^{h} 19^{m} 36.4^{s} +19° 52′ 10″ | M3.0V | 0.39-0.42 | 9.32 | 10.87 | 201.4064 ±0.0296 | flare star, one refuted planet (b in 2020) |
| Gliese 832 | | 16.2005 ±0.0019 | Gru* | 21^{h} 33^{m} 34.0^{s} −49° 00′ 32″ | M1.5 V | 0.45 | 8.66 | 10.20 | 201.3252 ±0.0237 | possible flare star, two planets; one confirmed (b (2008)), and the other now refuted (c (2014)) |
| Gliese 682 (CD-44 11909) | | 16.3328 ±0.0026 | Sco* | 17^{h} 37^{m} 03.7^{s} –44° 19′ 09″ | M4 V | 0.27 | 10.95 | 12.45 | 199.6944 ±0.0312 | has two disputed planets |
| Omicron^{2} Eridani (40 Eridani, Gliese 166) | Keid (A)$ | 16.3330 ±0.0042 | Eri | 04^{h} 15^{m} 16.3^{s} −07° 39′ 10″ | K0.5 V | 0.84 | 4.43# | 5.93 | 199.6911 ±0.0512 | has one refuted planet |
| Omicron^{2} Eridani (40 Eridani, Gliese 166) | B‡ | 16.3330 ±0.0042 | Eri | 04^{h} 15^{m} 21.8^{s} −07° 39′ 29″ | DA4 | 0.573 | 9.52 | 11.02 | 199.6911 ±0.0512 | |
| Omicron^{2} Eridani (40 Eridani, Gliese 166) | C | 16.3330 ±0.0042 | Eri | 04^{h} 15^{m} 21.5^{s} −07° 39′ 22″ | M4 V | 0.2036 | 11.24 | 12.74 | 199.6911 ±0.0512 | |
| EV Lacertae | | 16.4761 ±0.0018 | Lac* | 22^{h} 46^{m} 49.7^{s} +44° 20′ 02″ | M3.5 V | 0.35 | 10.22 | 11.70 | 197.9573 ±0.0220 | record setting stellar flare observed |
| 70 Ophiuchi (Gliese 702) | A$ | 16.7074 ±0.0087 | Oph | 18^{h} 05^{m} 27.4^{s} +02° 29′ 59″ | K0 V | 0.90 | 4.21# | 5.66 | 195.2166 ±0.1012 | |
| 70 Ophiuchi (Gliese 702) | B$ | 16.7074 ±0.0087 | Oph | 18^{h} 05^{m} 27.5^{s} +02° 29′ 56″ | K5 V | 0.70 | 6.01# | 7.46 | 195.2166 ±0.1012 | |
| Altair (Alpha Aquilae)$ | | 16.730 ±0.049 | Aql* | 19^{h} 50^{m} 47.0^{s} +08° 52′ 06″ | A7 IV-Vn | 1.79 | 0.77# | 2.22 | 194.95 ±0.57 | |
| EI Cancri (GJ 1116, G 9-38) | A | 16.800 ±0.011 | Cnc | 08^{h} 58^{m} 15.2^{s} +19° 45′ 47″ | M5.5 V | 0.12 | 14.06 | 15.50 | 194.1443 ±0.1228 | |
| EI Cancri (GJ 1116, G 9-38) | B | 16.800 ±0.011 | Cnc | 08^{h} 58^{m} 15.2^{s} +19° 45′ 47″ | M V | 0.10 | 14.92 | 16.36 | 194.1443 ±0.1228 | |
| WISE J150649.97+702736.1§ | | 16.856 ±0.052 | UMi* | 15^{h} 06^{m} 52.4^{s} +70° 27′ 25″ | T6 | | 13.74 J | 15.17 J | 193.5 ±0.6 | |
| GJ 3379 (G 99-49) | | 16.9861 ±0.0027 | Ori* | 06^{h} 00^{m} 03.5^{s} +02° 42′ 24″ | M3.5 V | 0.2312 | 11.31 | 12.73 | 192.0135 ±0.0310 | |
| DENIS J081730.0−615520§ | | 17.002 ±0.037 | Car | 08^{h} 17^{m} 30.1^{s} −61° 55′ 16″ | T6 | 0.015 | 13.61 J | 15.03 J | 191.8362 ±0.4186 | |
| Gliese 445 (LHS 2459, G 254-29) | | 17.1368 ±0.0017 | Cam* | 11^{h} 47^{m} 41.4^{s} +78° 41′ 28″ | M3.5 V | 0.14 | 10.79 | 12.19 | 190.3251 ±0.0194 | |
| 2MASS J15404342−5101357 | | 17.3738 ±0.0046 | Nor* | 15^{h} 40^{m} 43.5^{s} −51° 01′ 36″ | M7 V | 0.090 | 15.26 | 16.63 | 187.7290 ±0.0496 | |
| 2MASS 0939−2448 | A§ | 17.41 ±0.44 | Ant | 09^{h} 39^{m} 35.5^{s} −24° 48′ 28″ | T8 V | 0.019–0.048 | 15.61 J | 16.97 J | 187.3 ±4.6 | binary brown dwarf |
| 2MASS 0939−2448 | B§ | 17.41 ±0.44 | Ant | 09^{h} 39^{m} 35.5^{s} −24° 48′ 28″ | T8 V | 0.019–0.038 | | | 187.3 ±4.6 | binary brown dwarf |
| GJ 3323 (LHS 1723, LP 656-38) | | 17.5309 ±0.0026 | Eri | 05^{h} 01^{m} 57.4^{s} −06° 56′ 46″ | M4 V | 0.1705 | 12.22 | 13.57 | 186.0466 ±0.0277 | has two known planets |
| Gliese 526 (Wolf 498, HD 119850) | | 17.7263 ±0.0024 | Boo* | 13^{h} 45^{m} 43.8^{s} +14° 53′ 29″ | M1 V | 0.28 | 8.46 | 9.78 | 183.9962 ±0.0253 | |
| WISE 0350−5658§ | | 17.84 ±0.30 | Ret* | 03^{h} 50^{m} 00.3^{s} −56° 58′ 30″ | Y1 | | 22.47 J | 23.70 J | 182.9 ±3.1 | |
| Stein 2051 (Gliese 169.1, G 175-34) | A | 17.9925 ±0.0020 | Cam | 04^{h} 31^{m} 11.5^{s} +58° 58′ 37″ | M4 V | 0.252 | 11.04 | 12.33 | 181.2730 ±0.0203 | |
| Stein 2051 (Gliese 169.1, G 175-34) | B‡ | 17.9925 ±0.0020 | Cam | 04^{h} 31^{m} 12.6^{s} +58° 58′ 41″ | DC5 | 0.675 | 12.43 | 13.72 | 181.2730 ±0.0203 | |
| 2MASS J11145133−2618235§ | | 18.20 ±0.14 | Hya | 11^{h} 14^{m} 51.3^{s} −26° 18′ 24″ | T7.5 | 0.029–0.048 | 15.86 J | 17.12 J | 179.2 ±1.4 | |
| Gliese 251 (Wolf 294, HD 265866) | | 18.2146 ±0.0028 | Gem* | 06^{h} 54^{m} 49.0^{s} +33° 16′ 05″ | M3 V | 0.360 | 10.02 | 11.29 | 179.0629 ±0.0280 | has two known planets, one of them is in habitable zone |
| LP 816-60 | | 18.3305 ±0.0038 | Cap* | 20^{h} 52^{m} 33.0^{s} −16° 58′ 29″ | M3.5 V | 0.224 | 11.50 | 12.75 | 177.9312 ±0.0365 | |
| LSR J1835+3259§ | | 18.5534 ±0.0049 | Lyr* | 18^{h} 35^{m} 37.9^{s} +32° 59′ 55″ | M8.5 V | 0.053 | 18.27 | 19.50 | 175.7930 ±0.0468 | |
| Gliese 205 (Wolf 1453, HD 36395) | | 18.6042 ±0.0022 | Ori | 05^{h} 31^{m} 27.4^{s} −03° 40′ 38″ | M1 V | 0.556 | 7.95 | 9.17 | 175.3131 ±0.0204 | |
| 2MASS J04151954−0935066§ | | 18.62 ±0.18 | Eri | 04^{h} 15^{m} 19.5^{s} −09° 35′ 07″ | T8 | 0.03 | 15.34 J | 16.56 J | 175.2 ±1.7 | |
| Gliese 229 (HD 42581) | A | 18.7906 ±0.0018 | Lep* | 06^{h} 10^{m} 34.6^{s} −21° 51′ 53″ | M1.5 V | 0.579 | 8.14 | 9.34 | 173.5740 ±0.0170 | |
| Gliese 229 (HD 42581) | Ba§ | 18.7906 ±0.0018 | Lep* | 06^{h} 10^{m} 34.6^{s} −21° 51′ 53″ | T7 | 0.036 | 14.01 J | 15.21 J | 173.5740 ±0.0170 | |
| Gliese 229 (HD 42581) | Bb§ | 18.7906 ±0.0018 | Lep* | 06^{h} 10^{m} 34.6^{s} −21° 51′ 53″ | T8 | 0.033 | 14.01 J | 15.21 J | 173.5740 ±0.0170 | |
| Alsafi (Sigma Draconis)$ | | 18.7993 ±0.0081 | Dra | 19^{h} 32^{m} 21.6^{s} +69° 39′ 40″ | K0 V | 0.85 | 4.67# | 5.87 | 173.4939 ±0.0748 | |
| Ross 47 (Gliese 213) | | 18.8883 ±0.0031 | Ori | 05^{h} 42^{m} 09.3^{s} +12° 29′ 21″ | M4 V | 0.35 | 11.57 | 12.76 | 172.6762 ±0.0286 | |
| WISE 1541−2250& | | 18.93 ±0.17 | Lib | 15^{h} 41^{m} 51.6^{s} −22° 50′ 25″ | Y0.5 | 0.011 | 20.99 J | 22.10 J | 172.3 ±1.6 | |
| Gliese 570 (Lalande 27173, 33 G. Librae) | A$ | 19.1987 ±0.0074 | Lib* | 14^{h} 57^{m} 28.0^{s} −21° 24′ 56″ | K4 V | 0.802 | 5.64# | 6.79 | 169.8843 ±0.0653 | |
| Gliese 570 (Lalande 27173, 33 G. Librae) | B | 19.1987 ±0.0074 | Lib* | 14^{h} 57^{m} 28.0^{s} −21° 24′ 56″ | M1.5 V | 0.55 | 8.30 | 9.45 | 169.8843 ±0.0653 | |
| Gliese 570 (Lalande 27173, 33 G. Librae) | C | 19.1987 ±0.0074 | Lib* | 14^{h} 57^{m} 28.0^{s} −21° 24′ 56″ | M | 0.35 | 9.96 | 11.11 | 169.8843 ±0.0653 | |
| Gliese 570 (Lalande 27173, 33 G. Librae) | D§ | 19.1987 ±0.0074 | Lib* | 14^{h} 57^{m} 28.0^{s} −21° 24′ 56″ | T7.5 | 0.05 | 15.32 J | 16.47 J | 169.8843 ±0.0653 | |
| Gliese 693 (Luyten 205–128) | | 19.2078 ±0.0053 | Pav | 17^{h} 46^{m} 32.4^{s} −57° 19′ 09″ | M3 V | 0.26 | 10.76 | 11.91 | 169.8042 ±0.0465 | |
| Gliese 754 (Luyten 347–14) | | 19.2724 ±0.0067 | Tel* | 19^{h} 20^{m} 48.0^{s} −45° 33′ 30″ | M4 V | 0.173 | 12.23 | 13.37 | 169.2351 ±0.0588 | has one candidate planet |
| Gliese 908 (Lalande 46650, BR Piscium) | | 19.2745 ±0.0032 | Psc | 23^{h} 49^{m} 12.5^{s} +02° 24′ 04″ | M1 V | 0.37 | 8.98 | 10.12 | 169.2163 ±0.0281 | |
| Gliese 752 (Wolf 1055, HD 180617) | A | 19.2922 ±0.0027 | Aql | 19^{h} 16^{m} 55.3^{s} +05° 10′ 08″ | M2.5 V | 0.46 | 9.10 | 10.24 | 169.0615 ±0.0239 | has one known planet |
| Gliese 752 (Wolf 1055, HD 180617) | B (VB 10) | 19.2922 ±0.0027 | Aql | 19^{h} 16^{m} 57.6^{s} +05° 09′ 02″ | M8 V | 0.075 | 17.45 | 18.59 | 169.0615 ±0.0239 | very small and very dim red dwarf |
| Gliese 588 (CD-40 9712) | | 19.2996 ±0.0031 | Lup* | 15^{h} 32^{m} 12.9^{s} −41° 16′ 32″ | M2.5 V | 0.43 | 9.31 | 10.45 | 168.9965 ±0.0270 | has two candidate planets |
| Eta Cassiopeiae (Gliese 34) | Achird (A)$ | 19.3314 ±0.0025 | Cas* | 00^{h} 49^{m} 06.3^{s} +57° 48′ 55″ | G0 V | 0.972 | 3.46# | 4.60 | 168.7186 ±0.0216 | |
| Eta Cassiopeiae (Gliese 34) | B | 19.3314 ±0.0025 | Cas* | 00^{h} 49^{m} 06.3^{s} +57° 48′ 55″ | K7 V | 0.57 | 7.51 | 8.65 | 168.7186 ±0.0216 | |
| 36 Ophiuchi (Gliese 663) | Guniibuu (A)$ | 19.4185 ±0.0036 | Oph | 17^{h} 15^{m} 20.9^{s} −26° 36′ 09″ | K1.5 V | 0.85 | 5.07# | 6.20 | 167.9617 ±0.0311 | |
| 36 Ophiuchi (Gliese 663) | B$ | 19.4185 ±0.0036 | Oph | 17^{h} 15^{m} 21.0^{s} −26° 36′ 10″ | K1 V | 0.85 | 5.08# | 6.21 | 167.9617 ±0.0311 | |
| 36 Ophiuchi (Gliese 663) | C$ | 19.4185 ±0.0036 | Oph | 17^{h} 16^{m} 13.4^{s} −26° 32′ 46″ | K5 V | 0.71 | 6.32# | 7.45 | 167.9617 ±0.0311 | |
| YZ Canis Minoris (Ross 882, Gliese 285) | | 19.5330 ±0.0040 | CMi | 07^{h} 44^{m} 40.2^{s} +03° 33′ 09″ | M4 V | 0.308 | 11.19 | 12.30 | 166.9769 ±0.0343 | |
| GJ 1005 (Luyten 722-22, G 158-50) | A | 19.577 ±0.035 | Cet | 00^{h} 15^{m} 28.1^{s} −16° 08′ 02″ | M3.5 V | 0.179 | 11.60 | 12.71 | 166.6 ±0.3 | distance uncertain: 16.28±0.75, 17.91±0.67, 17.0±1.5, 16.26±0.76, 17.26, 19.695±0.095 ly |
| GJ 1005 (Luyten 722-22, G 158-50) | B | 19.577 ±0.035 | Cet | 00^{h} 15^{m} 28.1^{s} −16° 08′ 02″ | M V | 0.112 | 14.02 | 15.13 | 166.6 ±0.3 | distance uncertain: 16.28±0.75, 17.91±0.67, 17.0±1.5, 16.26±0.76, 17.26, 19.695±0.095 ly |
| HR 7703 (279 G. Sagittarii, HD 191408, Gliese 783, IRAS 20079-3614) | A$ | 19.609 ±0.013 | Sgr | 20^{h} 11^{m} 11.93^{s} –36° 06′ 04″ | K2.5 V | 0.65 | 5.31# | 6.41 | 166.3272 ±0.1065 | |
| HR 7703 (279 G. Sagittarii, HD 191408, Gliese 783, IRAS 20079-3614) | B | 19.609 ±0.013 | Sgr | 20^{h} 11^{m} 11.93^{s} –36° 06′ 04″ | M4 V | 0.24 | 11.50 | 12.60 | 166.3272 ±0.1065 | |
| 82 G. Eridani (e Eridani, Gliese 139, HD 20794)$ | | 19.7045 ±0.0093 | Eri | 03^{h} 19^{m} 55.7^{s} −43° 04′ 11″ | G8 V | 0.70 | 4.26# | 5.35 | 165.5242 ±0.0784 | has three confirmed planets, three dubious candidate planets, hot and cold dust disks |
| Gliese 268 (Ross 986, QY Aurigae) | A | 19.7414 ±0.0076 | Aur* | 07^{h} 10^{m} 01.8^{s} +38° 31′ 46″ | M4.5 V | 0.226 | 12.05 | 13.14 | 165.2147 ±0.0636 | |
| Gliese 268 (Ross 986, QY Aurigae) | B | 19.7414 ±0.0076 | Aur* | 07^{h} 10^{m} 01.8^{s} +38° 31′ 46″ | M V | 0.192 | 12.45 | 13.54 | 165.2147 ±0.0636 | |
| Delta Pavonis$ | | 19.893 ±0.015 | Pav | 20^{h} 08^{m} 43.6^{s} −66° 10′ 55″ | G8 IV | 1.051 | 3.55# | 4.62 | 163.9544 ±0.1222 | has one candidate planet |
| SIMP J013656.5+093347& | | 19.955 ±0.057 | Psc | 01^{h} 36^{m} 56.5^{s} +09° 33′ 47″ | T2.5 | 0.012 | 13.25 J | 14.32 J | 163.4478 ±0.4629 | rogue planet, 12.7 MJ |
| 2MASS 0937+2931§ | | 19.5 ±0.1 | Leo | 09^{h} 37^{m} 34.9^{s} +29° 31′ 41″ | T7 | 0.040 | 14.65 J | 15.71 J | 167.19 ±1.22 | |
| System | Name | Distance (ly | Cons. | RA/Dec (Ep. & Eq. J2000) | Stellar class | Mass (M_{☉}) | App. | Abs. | Parallax (mas) | Notes and additional references |
| Designation | | Distance (ly | Cons. | RA/Dec (Ep. & Eq. J2000) | Stellar class | Mass (M_{☉}) | Magnitude (m_{V} or m_{J}) | | Parallax (mas) | Notes and additional references |

== Distant future and past encounters ==
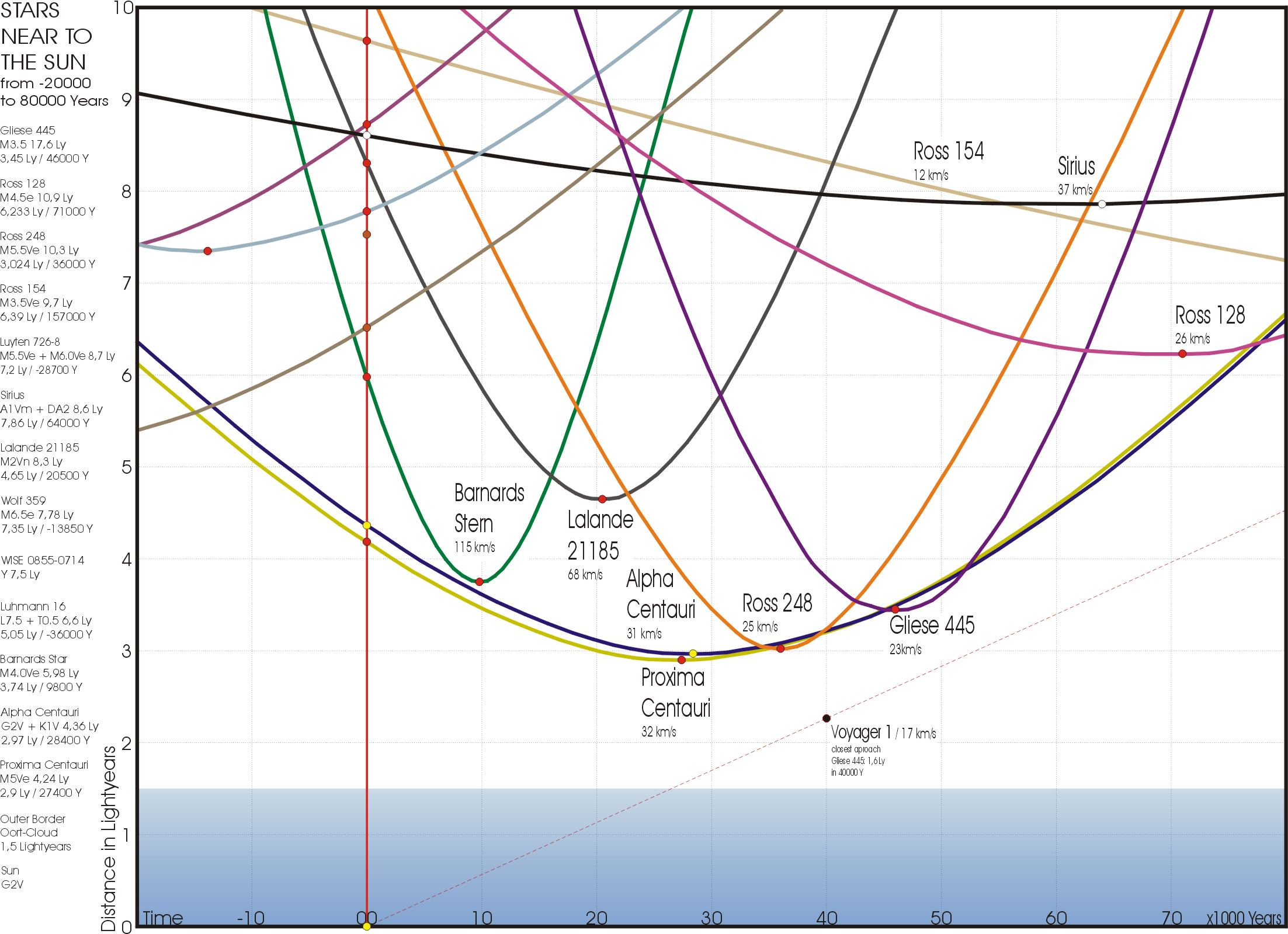
Distances of the nearest stars from 20,000 years ago until 80,000 years in the future

Visualisation of the orbit of the Sun (yellow dot and white curve) around the Galactic Center (GC) in the last galactic year. The red dots correspond to the positions of the stars studied by the European Southern Observatory in a monitoring programme.

Over long periods of time, the slow independent motion of stars change in both relative position and in their distance from the observer. This can cause other currently distant stars to fall within a stated range, which may be readily calculated and predicted using accurate astrometric measurements of parallax and total proper motions, along with spectroscopically determined radial velocities. Although extrapolations can be made into the past or future, they are subject to increasingly significant cumulative errors over very long periods. Inaccuracies of these measured parameters make determining the true minimum distances of any encountering stars or brown dwarfs fairly difficult.

One of the first stars known to approach the Sun particularly close is Gliese 710. The star, whose mass is roughly half that of the Sun, is currently 62 light-years from the Solar System. It was first noticed in 1999 using data from the Hipparcos satellite, and was estimated to pass less than 1.3 light-years (0.40 pc) from the Sun in 1.4 million years. With the release of Gaia's observations of the star, it has since been refined to a much closer 0.178 light-years (0.055 pc), close enough to significantly disturb objects in the hypothetical Oort cloud, which is thought to extend 1.2 light-years (0.37 pc) from the Sun.

Gaia's third data release has provided updated values for many of the candidates in the table below.

Stars that are known to have passed or will pass within 5 light-years of the Sun in the past or future
| Star name | Minimum distance (light-years) | Date of approach in thousands of years | Current distance (light-years) | Stellar Classification | Mass in M_{☉} | Current apparent magnitude | Current Constellation | Current Right ascension | Current Declination |
|---|---|---|---|---|---|---|---|---|---|
| Gliese 710 | 0.167±0.012 | 1296+24 −23 | 62.248±0.020 | K7V | 0.4–0.6 | 9.6 | Serpens | 18^{h} 19^{m} 50.843^{s} | −01° 56′ 18.98″ |
| HD 7977 | 0.478+0.104 −0.078 | −2764+28 −29 | 246.74±0.60 | G0V | ~1.2 | 9.04 | Cassiopeia | 01^{h} 20^{m} 31.597^{s} | +61° 52′ 57.08″ |
| Scholz's Star and companion brown dwarf | 0.82+0.37 −0.22 | −78.5±0.7 | 22.2±0.2 | A: M9V; B: T5 | A: 0.095; B: 0.063 | 18.3 | Monoceros | 07^{h} 20^{m} 03.20^{s} | −08° 46′ 51.2″ |
| 2MASS J0628+1845 | 1.61+0.28 −0.24 | 1720+150 −130 | 272.28±0.80 | M2.5V | 0.28 | 16.2 | Gemini | 06^{h} 28^{m} 11.593^{s} | +18° 45′ 12.91″ |
| 2MASS J0805+4624 | 1.610+0.099 −0.092 | −363+13 −14 | 238.1±1.0 | M3V | 0.25 | 17.0 | Lynx | 08^{h} 05^{m} 29.038^{s} | +46° 24′ 51.78″ |
| CD-69 2001 | 1.616+0.070 −0.068 | −1907±10 | 332.61±0.55 | K4V | 0.61 | 11.13 | Indus | 21^{h} 40^{m} 31.514^{s} | −69° 25′ 14.58″ |
| HD 49995 | 1.70+0.23 −0.20 | −4034+94 −98 | 439.74±0.59 | A: F3V; B: M1V | A: 1.48; B: 0.49 | 8.78 | Canis Major | 06^{h} 50^{m} 20.810^{s} | −18° 37′ 30.58″ |
| 2MASS J0621-0101 | 1.71+0.46 −0.39 | −3206+68 −66 | 428.8±3.1 | G5V | 0.96 | 11.9 | Orion | 06^{h} 21^{m} 34.807^{s} | −01° 01′ 55.01″ |
| LSPM J2146+3813 | 1.8557±0.0048 | 84.59±0.19 | 22.9858±0.0034 | M5V | ~0.15 | 10.82 | Cygnus | 21^{h} 46^{m} 22.285^{s} | +38° 13′ 03.12″ |
| 2MASS J0455+1144 | 1.94+0.16 −0.15 | 1702+58 −54 | 349.50±0.80 | M0V | 0.50 | 15.3 | Orion | 04^{h} 55^{m} 21.427^{s} | +11° 44′ 41.25″ |
| 2MASS J0734-0637 | 1.950±0.021 | −554.6±3.3 | 130.66±0.12 | M0V | 0.50 | 12.9 | Monoceros | 07^{h} 34^{m} 39.097^{s} | −06° 37′ 12.21″ |
| 2MASS J1151-0313 | 1.98+0.20 −0.18 | 1017+60 −54 | 125.88±0.41 | M3.5V | 0.23 | 15.3 | Virgo | 11^{h} 51^{m} 37.434^{s} | −03° 13′ 45.24″ |
| UCAC4 076–006432 | 2.042+0.034 −0.033 | −893.8+7.9 −8.0 | 212.41±0.15 | mid K | ~0.6 | 12.69 | Mensa | 06^{h} 34^{m} 29.385^{s} | −74° 49′ 47.12″ |
| 2MASS J0120+4739 | 2.25+0.17 −0.15 | 473+27 −25 | 237.56±0.66 | M3.5V | 0.25 | 16.5 | Andromeda | 01^{h} 20^{m} 04.561^{s} | +47° 39′ 46.56″ |
| TYC 6760–1510–1 | 2.46+0.19 −0.18 | −1708+44 −47 | 102.89±0.16 | M1.5V | 0.58 | 11.5 | Hydra | 15^{h} 00^{m} 09.536^{s} | −29° 05′ 27.67″ |
| UCAC2 15719371 | 2.46±0.10 | −4282+70 −73 | 280.80±0.26 | K4V | 0.66 | 12.58 | Antlia | 09^{h} 44^{m} 09.884^{s} | −37° 45′ 31.09″ |
| TYC 1662–1962–1 | 2.637+0.055 −0.054 | −1536.6+9.0 −9.1 | 286.51±0.40 | Early K | ~0.8 | 10.95 | Vulpecula | 21^{h} 14^{m} 32.911^{s} | +21° 53′ 32.76″ |
| HD 179939 | 2.65±0.17 | 3020±25 | 334.32±0.88 | A3V | 1.7 | 7.23 | Aquila | 19^{h} 14^{m} 10.043^{s} | +07° 45′ 50.72″ |
| BD-21 1529 | 2.701+0.059 −0.058 | −1660.1±6.3 | 368.48±0.56 | G5V | ~0.95 | 9.67 | Canis Major | 06^{h} 37^{m} 48.004^{s} | −21° 22′ 21.94″ |
| 2MASS J1310-1307 | 2.79+0.59 −0.47 | −1520+150 −190 | 433.0±2.6 | M2.5V | 0.34 | 16.3 | Virgo | 13^{h} 10^{m} 30.804^{s} | −13° 07′ 33.55″ |
| UPM J1121-5549 | 2.803±0.020 | −282.5+1.6 −1.7 | 72.498±0.029 | M3V | 0.29 | 13.5 | Centaurus | 11^{h} 21^{m} 18.136^{s} | −55° 49′ 17.77″ |
| UCAC4 464–006057 | 2.812+0.052 −0.051 | 932±11 | 101.570±0.086 | Early M | ~0.4 | 11.73 | Taurus | 04^{h} 09^{m} 02.050^{s} | +02° 45′ 38.32″ |
| UCAC4 213–008644 | 2.91+0.13 −0.12 | −306+12 −13 | 80.987±0.048 | M5.0 | 0.17 | 16.4 | Puppis | 06^{h} 21^{m} 54.714^{s} | −47° 25′ 31.33″ |
| GJ 3649 | 3.016±0.024 | −520.4±3.1 | 54.435±0.023 | M1 | 0.49 | 10.85 | Leo | 11^{h} 12^{m} 38.97^{s} | +18° 56′ 05.4″ |
| Ross 248 | 3.0446±0.0077 | 38.500±0.096 | 10.3057±0.0014 | M6V | 0.136 | 12.29 | Andromeda | 23^{h} 41^{m} 54.99^{s} | +44° 10′ 40.8″ |
| 2MASS J1921-1244 | 3.08+0.21 −0.19 | −3490+120 −130 | 376.46±0.73 | K6V | 0.69 | 12.46 | Sagittarius | 19^{h} 21^{m} 58.124^{s} | −12° 43′ 58.61″ |
| Proxima Centauri | 3.123±0.015 | 28.65±0.27 | 4.24646±0.00028 | M5Ve | 0.15 | 11.05 | Centaurus | 14^{h} 29^{m} 42.949^{s} | −62° 40′ 46.14″ |
| TYC 9387–2515–1 | 3.220+0.081 −0.079 | −1509.1+8.6 −8.7 | 401.96±0.54 | K1V | 0.86 | 11.45 | Mensa | 06^{h} 18^{m} 54.643^{s} | −80° 19′ 16.54″ |
| Alpha Centauri AB | 3.242±0.060 | 29.63+1.00 −0.98 | 4.321±0.024 | A: G2V; B: K1V | A: 1.100; B: 0.907 | A: -0.01; B: +1.33 | Centaurus | 14^{h} 39^{m} 36.495^{s} | −60° 50′ 02.31″ |
| Gliese 445 | 3.3400±0.0051 | 46.341±0.065 | 17.1368±0.0017 | M4 | 0.15? | 10.8 | Camelopardalis | 11^{h} 47^{m} 41.377^{s} | +78° 41′ 28.18″ |
| 2MASS J1638-6355 | 3.37+0.29 −0.28 | −1428+21 −22 | 468.5±4.2 | K2V | 0.82 | 12.44 | Triangulum Australe | 16^{h} 38^{m} 21.759^{s} | −63° 55′ 13.16″ |
| 2MASS J0542+3217 | 3.43+0.75 −0.71 | 5823+89 −87 | 884.6±2.4 | A: G4V; B: K0V | A: 1.01; B: 0.85 | 12.80 | Auriga | 05^{h} 42^{m} 38.349^{s} | +32° 17′ 29.85″ |
| 2MASS J0625-2408 | 3.700+0.082 −0.080 | −1874±14 | 534.88±0.93 | K/M | ~0.5 | 12.91 | Canis Major | 06^{h} 25^{m} 42.744^{s} | −24° 08′ 35.02″ |
| Barnard's Star | 3.7682±0.0031 | 11.735±0.013 | 5.96290±0.00044 | sdM4 | 0.144 | 9.54 | Ophiuchus | 17^{h} 57^{m} 48.498^{s} | +04° 41′ 36.25″ |
| BD+05 1792 | 3.965±0.040 | −962.7±3.0 | 239.73±0.33 | G2V | 1.07 | 8.58 | Gemini | 07^{h} 48^{m} 07.037^{s} | +05° 27′ 22.51″ |
| 2MASS J2241-2759 | 4.05±0.16 | −2810+37 −38 | 411.06±0.76 | K7V | ~0.5 | 12.28 | Piscis Austrinus | 22^{h} 41^{m} 50.996^{s} | −27° 59′ 47.04″ |
| 2MASS J1724-0522 | 4.15+0.26 −0.25 | 3058+54 −52 | 489.5±1.3 | K0V | 0.86 | 12.73 | Ophiuchus | 17^{h} 24^{m} 55.056^{s} | −05° 22′ 11.45″ |
| StKM 1–554 | 4.217+0.036 −0.035 | −549.9+2.9 −3.0 | 151.97±0.19 | M0V | 0.65 | 12.17 | Orion | 05^{h} 14^{m} 01.871^{s} | +05° 22′ 56.26″ |
| GJ 3379 | 4.227±0.024 | −157.43+0.93 −0.94 | 16.9861±0.0027 | M3.5V | 0.19 | 11.31 | Orion | 06^{h} 00^{m} 03.824^{s} | +02° 42′ 22.97″ |
| 2MASS J1936+3627 | 4.23+0.62 −0.57 | 3830+120 −110 | 671.6±3.4 | G5.5V | 0.95 | 12.2 | Cygnus | 19^{h} 36^{m} 57.294^{s} | +36° 27′ 57.71″ |
| 2MASS J0710+5228 | 4.303±0.039 | 507.6+3.8 −3.7 | 90.949±0.050 | M3V | 0.33 | 12.52 | Lynx | 07^{h} 10^{m} 52.167^{s} | +52° 28′ 18.49″ |
| HD 146248 | 4.341+0.040 −0.039 | −1141.5±3.7 | 334.87±0.47 | G2/3IV | 1.23 | 9.47 | Triangulum Australe | 16^{h} 19^{m} 27.875^{s} | −64° 50′ 34.38″ |
| 2MASS J1724+0355 | 4.37±0.12 | 1991+38 −37 | 254.99±0.26 | G8V | 0.85 | 12.54 | Ophiuchus | 17^{h} 24^{m} 34.633^{s} | +03° 55′ 26.75″ |
| StKM 1–1456 | 4.396±0.043 | 1240.2+6.9 −6.8 | 144.934±0.095 | A: K5V; B: M8V | A: 0.81; B: 0.09 | 10.58 | Hercules | 17^{h} 17^{m} 31.118^{s} | +15° 34′ 55.35″ |
| Zeta Leporis | 4.43+0.33 −0.30 | −878+42 −46 | 72.81±0.40 | A2Vann | 2.0 | 3.55 | Lepus | 05^{h} 46^{m} 57.341^{s} | −14° 49′ 19.02″ |
| Lalande 21185 | 4.6807±0.0055 | 21.973±0.033 | 8.30437±0.00068 | M2V | 0.39 | 7.52 | Ursa Major | 11^{h} 03^{m} 20.194^{s} | +35° 58′ 11.55″ |
| HD 68814 | 4.724+0.090 −0.089 | −2242±13 | 259.85±0.30 | G6V | 0.98 | 9.57 | Hydra | 08^{h} 13^{m} 57.112^{s} | −04° 03′ 12.56″ |
| 2MASS J1941-4602 | 4.814+0.050 −0.049 | −456.5+4.1 −4.2 | 66.848±0.033 | M4-M6 | ~0.15 | 12.4 | Telescopium | 19^{h} 41^{m} 53.18^{s} | −46° 02′ 31.4″ |

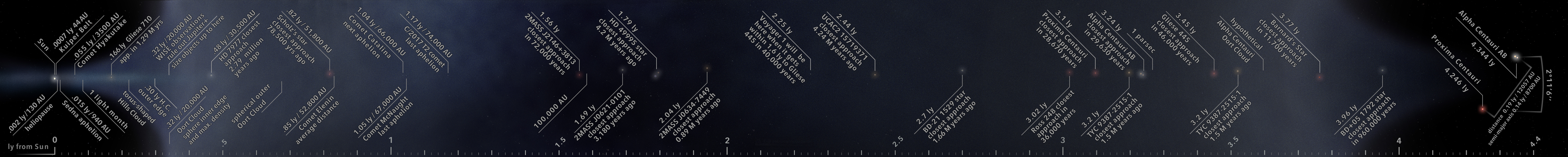
Schematic view to scale of past and future close approaches of stars to the Sun (Up to 4.5 light-years)

== See also ==
- Interstellar travel
- Location of Earth
- The Magnificent Seven
- Nearby Stars Database
- Solar System#Galactic position
- Stars in fiction

=== Related lists ===
- List of stars with resolved images
- List of brightest stars
- List of star systems within 20–25 light-years
- List of star systems within 25–30 light-years
- List of star systems within 30–35 light-years
- List of star systems within 35–40 light-years
- List of star systems within 40–45 light-years
- List of star systems within 45–50 light-years
- List of star systems within 50–55 light-years
- List of star systems within 55–60 light-years
- List of star systems within 60–65 light-years
- List of star systems within 65–70 light-years
- List of star systems within 70–75 light-years
- List of star systems within 75–80 light-years
- List of star systems within 80–85 light-years
- List of star systems within 85–90 light-years
- List of star systems within 90–95 light-years
- List of star systems within 95–100 light-years
- List of star systems within 100–150 light-years
- List of star systems within 150–200 light-years
- List of star systems within 200–250 light-years
- List of star systems within 250–300 light-years
- List of star systems within 300–350 light-years
- List of star systems within 350–400 light-years
- List of star systems within 400–450 light-years
- List of star systems within 450–500 light-years
- List of nearest giant stars
- List of nearest supergiants
- List of nearest hypergiants
- List of nearest bright stars
  - Historical brightest stars
- List of nearest exoplanets
- List of nearest terrestrial exoplanet candidates
- List of nearest stars by spectral type
- List of nearby stellar associations and moving groups
- List of star-forming regions in the Local Group
- Lists of stars
- List of Solar System objects by greatest aphelion
- List of trans-Neptunian objects
- List of nearest known black holes
