= List of artificial objects leaving the Solar System =

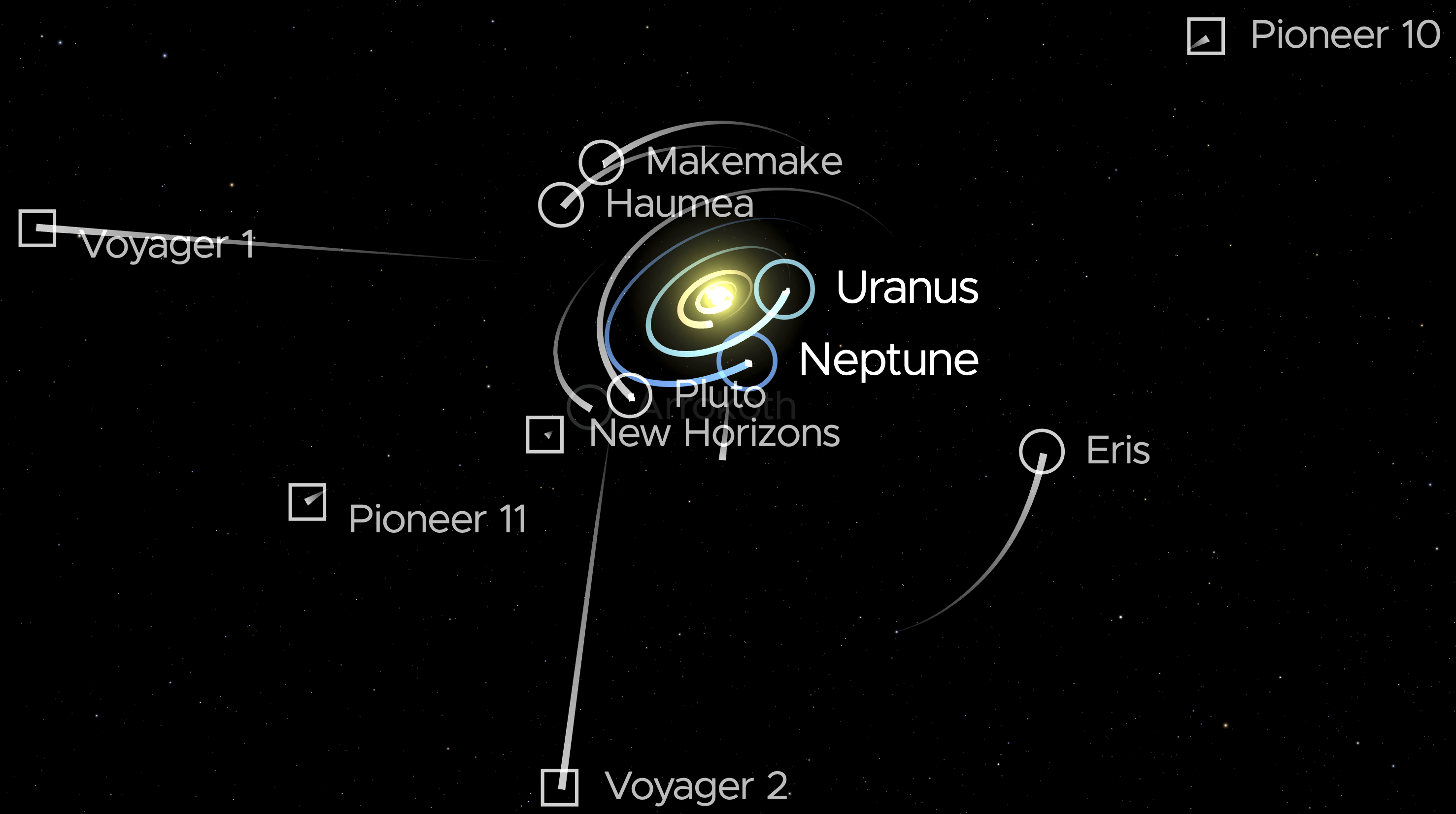
Spacecraft that have left or are about to leave the Solar System are depicted as square boxes

Trajectories of distant spacecraft from launch to 2030
Top: Polar view; Bottom: Equatorial view

Plot of Voyager 2′s heliocentric velocity against its distance from the Sun, illustrating the use of gravity assist to accelerate the spacecraft by Jupiter, Saturn and Uranus, and finally its encounter with Neptune's Triton. Very massive planets attract spacecraft towards them, through the gravitational force; this force accelerates the spacecraft. If the spacecraft is not on a collision trajectory with the planet, and the spacecraft is travelling faster than the escape velocity of the planet, the spacecraft will travel past the planet gaining speed from the gravitational acceleration; this is called a gravity assist (or “gravitational slingshot”).

Five space probes and the upper stages of their launch vehicles are leaving the Solar System, all of which were launched by NASA. The borders of the Solar System are usually defined by the Heliopause diameter at about 120 astronomical units (AU; one AU is roughly the average distance between Earth and the Sun: 150 million kilometers (93 million miles)). Three of the probes, Voyager 1, Voyager 2, and New Horizons, are still functioning and are regularly contacted by radio communication, while Pioneer 10 and Pioneer 11 are now derelict. In addition to these spacecraft, some upper stages and de-spin weights are leaving the Solar System, assuming they continue on their trajectories.

These objects are leaving the Solar System because their velocity and direction are taking them away from the Sun, and at their distance from the Sun, its gravitational pull is not sufficient to pull these objects back or into orbit. They are not impervious to the gravitational pull of the Sun and are being slowed, but are still traveling in excess of escape velocity to leave the Solar System and coast into interstellar space.

== Planetary exploration probes ==
- Pioneer 10 – launched in March 1972, flew past Jupiter in 1973 and is heading in the direction of Aldebaran (65 light years away) in the constellation of Taurus. Contact was lost in January 2003, and it is estimated to have passed 138 astronomical units.
- Pioneer 11 – launched in April 1973, flew past Jupiter in 1974 and Saturn in 1979. Contact was lost in November 1995, and it is estimated to be at 116 AU. The spacecraft is heading toward the constellation of Aquila, northwest of the constellation of Sagittarius. Barring any incident, Pioneer 11 will pass near one of the stars in the constellation in about four million years.
- Voyager 2 – launched in August 1977, flew past Jupiter in 1979, Saturn in 1981, Uranus in 1986, and Neptune in 1989. The probe left the heliosphere for interstellar space at 119 AU on November 5, 2018. Voyager 2 is still active. It is not heading toward any particular star, although in roughly 40,000 years it should pass 1.7 light-years from the star Ross 248. Ross 248 and the Sun currently approach each other. In about 36,000 years they will fly past each other at a distance of under 3 light-years. If undisturbed for 296,000 years, Voyager 2 should pass by the star Sirius at a distance of 4.3 light-years.
- Voyager 1 – launched in September 1977, flew past Jupiter in 1979 and Saturn in 1980, making a special close approach to Saturn's moon Titan. The probe passed the heliopause at 121 AU on August 25, 2012, to enter interstellar space. Voyager 1 is still active. On November 18, 2026, Voyager 1 became the first spacecraft to reach a distance of one light-day (about 25.9 billion kilometers, or 16.1 billion miles) from Earth. In about 40,000 years the star Gliese 445 (AC +79 3888) and the Sun will fly past each other at a distance of 3.45 light-years, after being currently 17.6 light-years from each other, with Voyager 1 coming as close as 1.6 light-years to Gliese 445 at that time.
- New Horizons – launched in January 2006, the probe flew past Jupiter in 2007 and Pluto on July 14, 2015. It flew past the Kuiper belt object 486958 Arrokoth on January 1, 2019, as part of the Kuiper Belt Extended Mission (KEM). On April 17, 2021, it reached a distance of 50 AU from the Sun.

Although other probes were launched first, Voyager 1 has achieved a higher speed and overtaken all others. Voyager 1 overtook Voyager 2 a few months after launch, on December 19, 1977. It overtook Pioneer 11 in 1981, and then Pioneer 10—becoming the probe farthest from the Sun—on February 17, 1998. Voyager 2 is moving faster than all other probes launched before it; it overtook Pioneer 11 in the late 1980s and then Pioneer 10 — becoming the second-farthest spacecraft from the Sun — in July 2023.

Depending on how the "Pioneer anomaly" (heat radiating from the power source) affects it, New Horizons will also probably pass the Pioneer probes, but will need many years to do so. It will overtake Pioneer 11 in 2143, and will overtake Pioneer 10 in 2314, but will never overtake the Voyagers.

== Speed and distance from the Sun ==
To put the distances in the table in context, Pluto's average distance (semi-major axis) is about 40 AU.

Name	Launched	Contact lost (as of 2026)	Distance from the Sun (AU) (as of 2026)	Speed (km/s)	Local escape velocity (km/s)	Hyperbolic excess speed (km/s)
Voyager 1	1977-09	-	172.1	16.9	3.2	16.6
Voyager 2	1977-08	-	144.2	15.2	3.5	14.8
Pioneer 10	1972	2003	142.1	11.8	3.6	11.2
Pioneer 11	1973	1995	119.4	11.1	3.9	10.4
New Horizons	2006	-	65.8	13.5	5.3	12.4
General computation			1	42.1	42.1	0

Note: Data above as of October 19, 2026. Source: JPL, heavens-above.com, and for New Horizons.

Solar escape velocity is a function of distance (r) from the Sun's center, given by

$$v_e = \sqrt{\frac{2GM_\text{sun}}{r}},$$

where the product G M_{sun} is the heliocentric gravitational parameter. If r is measured in AU then the escape velocity in km/s becomes $\frac{42.1}{\sqrt r}$. The initial speed required to escape the Sun from its surface is 618 km/s (1,380,000 mph or 1 /485 the speed of light), and drops down to 42.1 km/s (94,000 mph) at Earth's distance from the Sun (1 AU), and 4.21 km/s (9,400 mph) at a distance of 100 AU.

Voyager 1 and 2 speed and distance from the Sun

Pioneer 10 and 11 speed and distance from the Sun

New Horizons speed and distance from the Sun.

In order to leave the Solar System, the probe needs to reach the local escape velocity. Escape velocity from the sun without the influence of Earth is 42.1 km/s. In order to reach this speed, it is highly advantageous to use as a boost the orbital speed of the Earth around the Sun, which is 29.78 km/s. By later passing near a planet, a probe can gain extra speed from a gravity assist.

If a probe has current speed $v$ and this is above the local escape velociy $v_\text{e}$ then the Sun will keep slowing it down but not towards zero. It will approach the hyperbolic excess speed $v_\infty = \sqrt{v^2 - {v_\text{e}}^2}.$.

== Propulsion stages ==
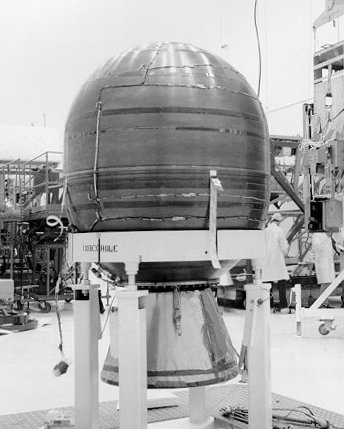
A Star-48 rocket motor like the one used to launch the New Horizons probe

Every planetary probe was placed into its escape trajectory by a multistage rocket, the last stage of which ends up on nearly the same trajectory as the probe it launched. Because these stages cannot be actively guided, their trajectories are now different from the probes they launched (the probes having been guided with small thrusters that allowed course changes). However, in cases where the spacecraft acquired escape velocity because of a gravity assist, the stages may not have a similar course and there is the extremely remote possibility that they collided with something. The stages on an escape trajectory are:

- Pioneer 10 third stage, a TE364-4 variant of the Star-37 solid fuel rocket.
- Voyager 1 fourth stage, a Star 37E solid fuel rocket.
- Voyager 2 fourth stage, a Star 37E solid fuel rocket.
- New Horizons third stage, a Star 48B solid fuel rocket, is on a similar escape trajectory out of the Solar System to New Horizons, even arriving at Jupiter six hours before New Horizons. On October 15, 2015, it passed Pluto's orbit at a distance of 213 million kilometers (over 1 AU) distant from Pluto. This was four months after New Horizons' Pluto flyby.

In addition, two small yo-yo de-spin weights on wires were used to reduce the spin of the New Horizons probe prior to its release from the third-stage rocket. Once the spin rate was lowered, these masses and the wires were released, and so are also on an escape trajectory out of the Solar System.

None of the above objects are trackable – they have no power or radio antennas, spin uncontrollably, and are too small to be detected. Their exact positions are unknowable beyond their projected Solar System escape trajectories.

The third stage of Pioneer 11 is thought to be in solar orbit because its encounter with Jupiter would not have resulted in escape from the Solar System. Pioneer 11 gained the required velocity to escape the Solar System in its subsequent encounter with Saturn.

On January 19, 2006, the New Horizons spacecraft to Pluto was launched directly into a solar-escape trajectory at 16.26 kilometers per second (58,536 km/h; 36,373 mph) from Cape Canaveral using an Atlas V and the Common Core Booster, Centaur upper stage, and Star 48B third stage. New Horizons passed the Moon's orbit in just nine hours. The subsequent encounter with Jupiter only increased its velocity, and enabled the probe to arrive at Pluto three years earlier than without this encounter.

Thus the only objects to date to be launched directly into a solar escape trajectory were the New Horizons spacecraft, its third stage, and the two de-spin masses. The New Horizons Centaur (second) stage is not escaping; it is in a 2.83-year heliocentric (solar) orbit.

The Pioneer 10 and 11, and Voyager 1 and 2 Centaur (second) stages are also in heliocentric orbits.

== In the future ==
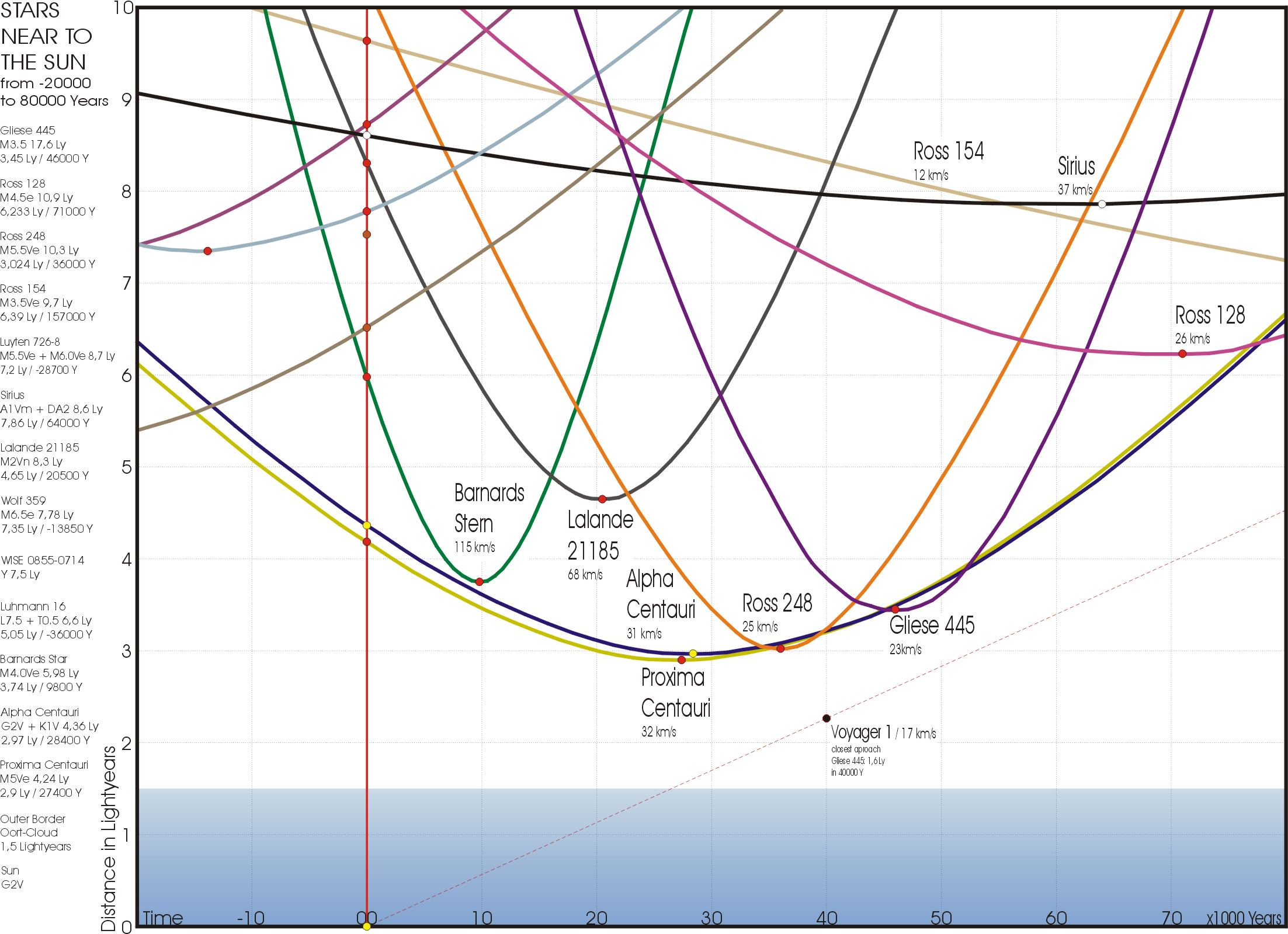
Voyager 1 and close encounters of the Sun with other stars in the next 100,000 years.

Given the huge emptiness of interstellar space, all the objects listed here are likely to continue into deep space in timelines that, barring the exceptionally unlikely chance of their colliding with (or being collected by) another object, could outlast even the main sequence existence of the Sun's life, billions of years hence. One estimated timescale as to the likelihood of the Pioneer or Voyager spacecraft colliding with a star (or stellar remnant) is 10^{20} (100 quintillion) years, or about 7 billion times the current age of the universe. They are very unlikely, however, to gain enough velocity to escape the Milky Way galaxy (or its future merger with the Andromeda Galaxy) into intergalactic space.

=== Ulysses ===
In 1990, the solar probe Ulysses was launched towards Jupiter in order to reach a high-inclination heliocentric orbit over the Sun's poles; the spacecraft was shut down in 2008. Ulysses is currently in a 79° inclination orbit around the Sun with its apoapsis crossing the orbit of Jupiter. In November 2098, it will have another close fly-by with Jupiter, crossing between the orbits of Europa and Ganymede. After this slingshot maneuver, it will possibly enter a hyperbolic trajectory around the Sun and eventually leave the Solar System.

Ulysses is now switched off as its RTG power supply has run down, and so is uncontactable and cannot be tracked or guided in any way since 2009. Its exact trajectory is therefore unknowable as factors such as solar radiation pressure could significantly alter its encounter path.

== Gallery ==
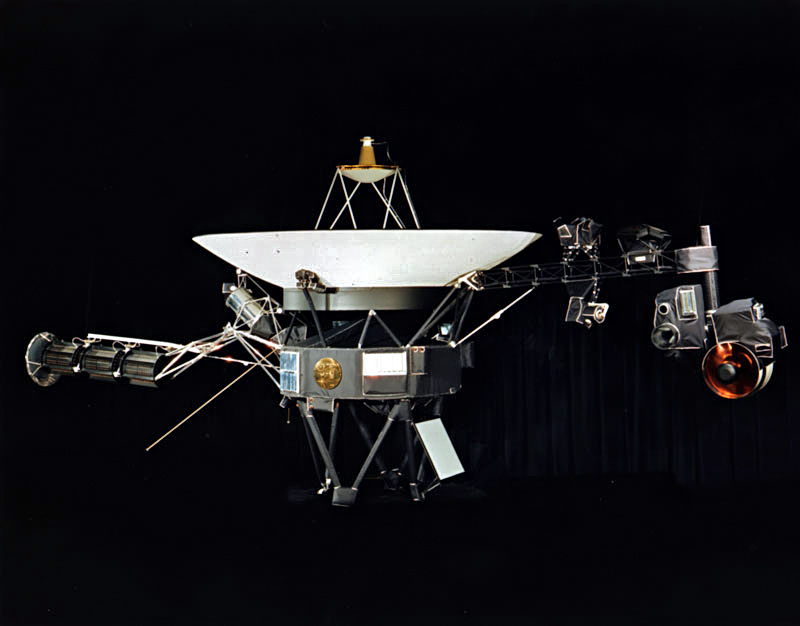
Photograph of Voyager 1 / Voyager 2

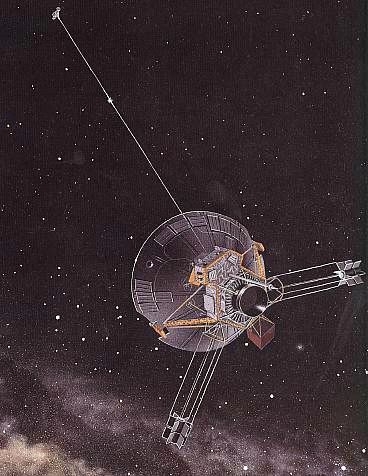
Artist's concept of Pioneer 10 / Pioneer 11

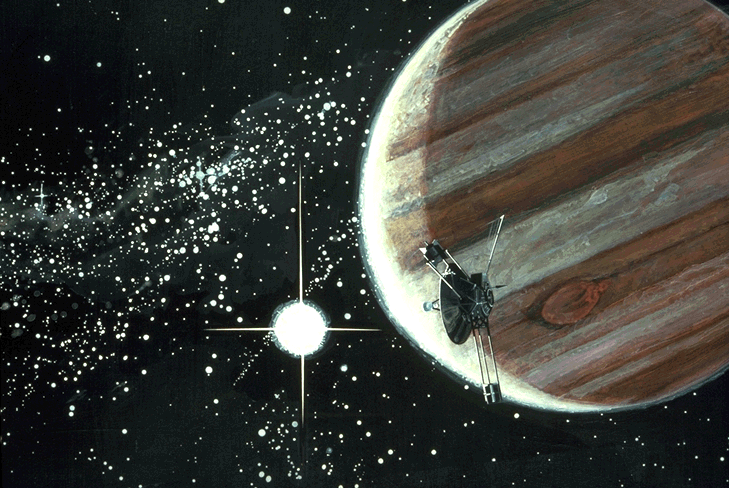
Artist's concept of Pioneer 10 near Jupiter

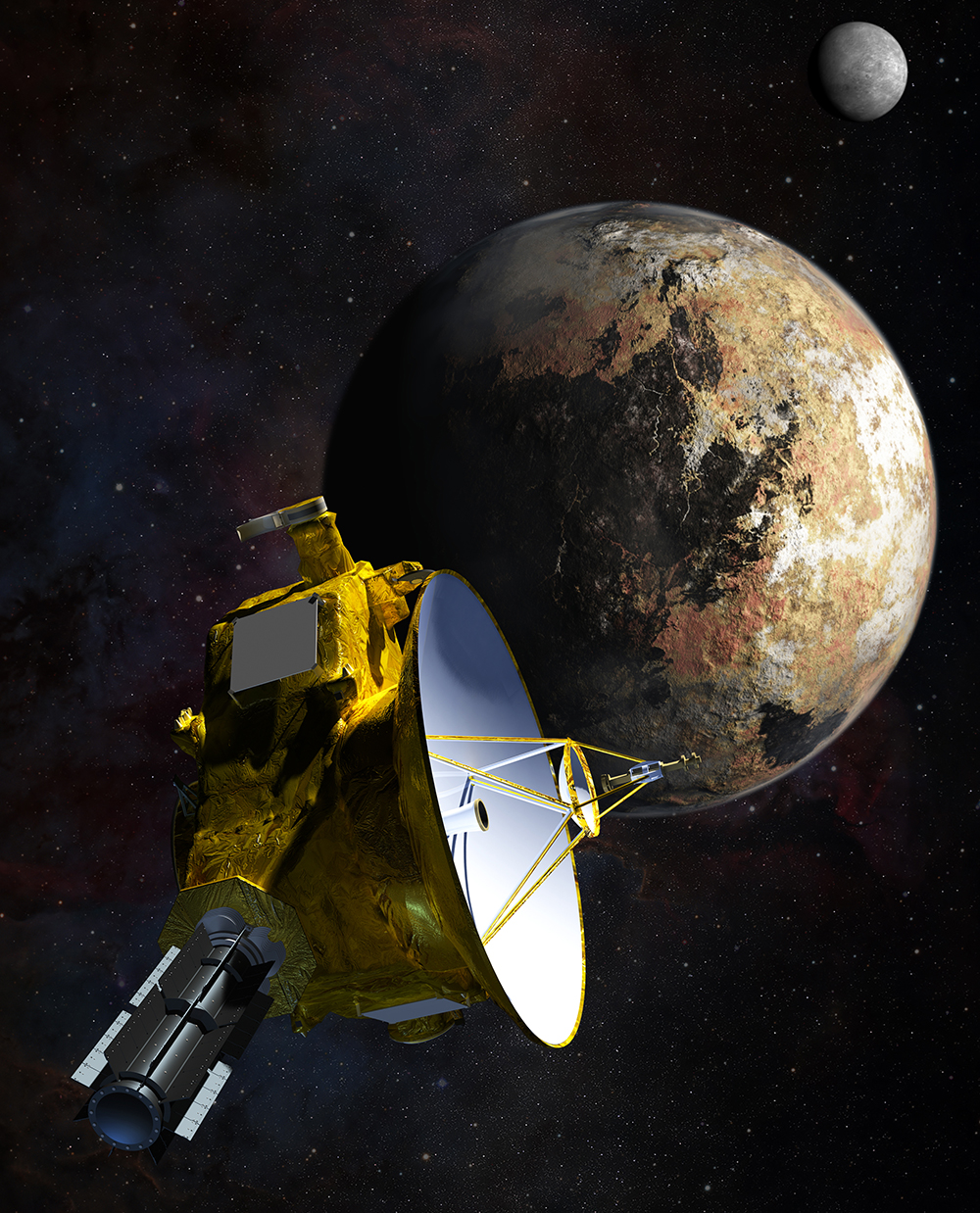
Artist's concept of New Horizons approaching Pluto.

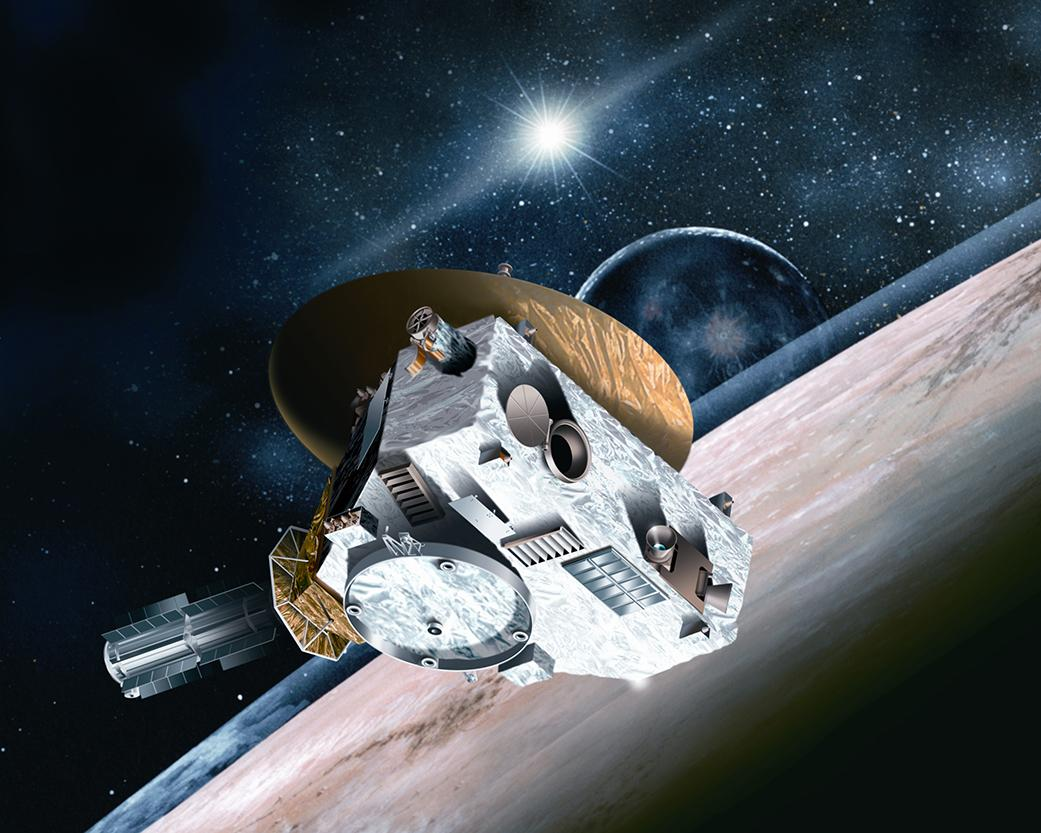
Artist's concept of New Horizons near Pluto.

== See also ==
- Interstellar probe
- Intergalactic travel
- List of interplanetary voyages
- List of missions to the outer planets
- List of extraterrestrial orbiters
- List of artificial objects on extraterrestrial surfaces
- List of spacecraft intentionally crashed into extraterrestrial bodies
- Oberth effect
