= Gliese 710 =

Star in the constellation Serpens

Observation data Epoch J2000 Equinox ICRS
- Constellation: Serpens
- Right ascension: 18^{h} 19^{m} 50.8412^{s}
- Declination: −01° 56′ 19.005″
- Apparent magnitude (V): 9.65–9.69

Characteristics
- Evolutionary stage: main sequence
- Spectral type: K7 Vk
- U−B color index: +1.26
- B−V color index: +1.37
- Variable type: Suspected

Astrometry
Radial velocity (R_{v})	−13.905±0.022 km/s
Proper motion (μ)	RA: −0.414±0.019 mas/yr Dec.: −0.108±0.017 mas/yr
Parallax (π)	52.3963±0.0171 mas
Distance	62.25 ± 0.02 ly (19.085 ± 0.006 pc)
Absolute magnitude (M_{V})	8.20

Details
Mass	0.595±0.013 M_{☉}
Radius	0.5865±0.0043 R_{☉}
Luminosity (bolometric)	0.09236±0.00051 L_{☉}
Surface gravity (log g)	4.66 cgs
Temperature	4,155±14 K
Metallicity [Fe/H]	−0.11 dex
Rotational velocity (v sin i)	6.42±0.78 km/s
Age	300 Myr

Other designations
- Gliese 710, BD−01°3474, HIP 89825, HD 168442, NSV 10635

Database references
SIMBAD	data
ARICNS	data

Gliese 710, or HIP 89825, is an orangish 0.6 M_{☉} star in the constellation Serpens Cauda. It is projected to pass near the Sun in about 1.29 million years at a predicted minimum distance of 0.051 parsecs – 0.1663 light-years (10,520 astronomical units; 1.573 trillion kilometres) – about 1/25 of the current distance to Proxima Centauri. Such a distance would make for a similar brightness to the brightest planets, optimally reaching an apparent magnitude of about −2.7. The star's proper motion will peak around one arcminute per year, a rate of apparent motion that would be noticeable over a human lifespan. This is a timeframe, based on data from Data Release 3 from the Gaia spacecraft, well within the parameters of current models which cover the next 15 million years.

== Description ==
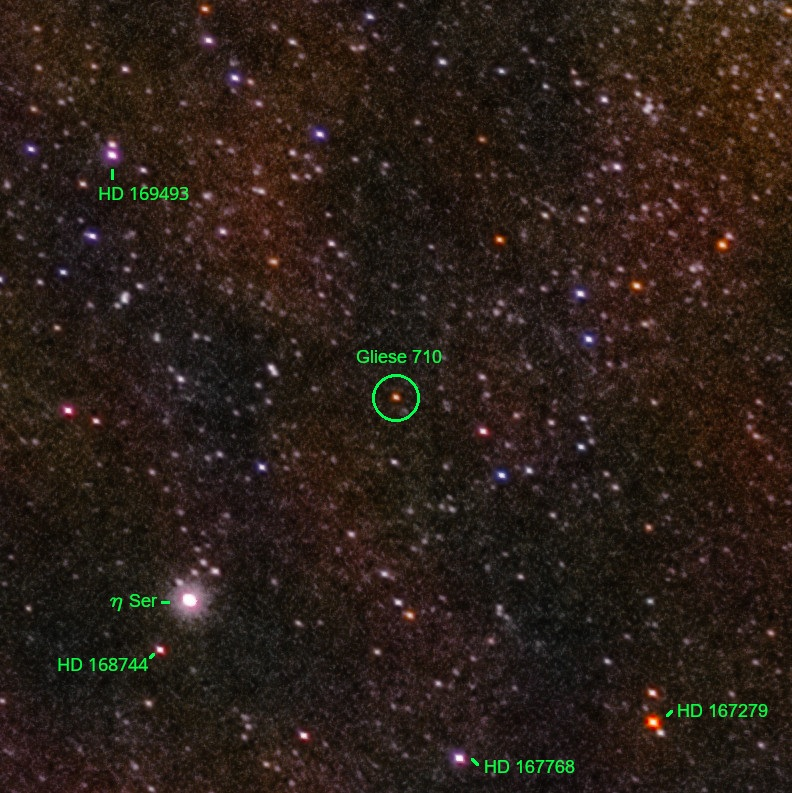
Star field centered on Gliese 710

Gliese 710 is currently 62.3 light-years (19.1 parsecs) from Earth in the constellation Serpens and has a below naked-eye visual magnitude of 9.69. A stellar classification of K7 Vk means it is a small main-sequence star mostly generating energy through the thermonuclear fusion of hydrogen in its core. (The suffix 'k' indicates that the spectrum shows absorption lines from interstellar matter.) Stellar mass is about 57% of the Sun's mass with an estimated 58% of the Sun's radius. It is suspected to be a variable star that may vary in magnitude from 9.65 to 9.69. As of 2020, no planets have been detected orbiting it.

== Computing and details of the closest approach ==
An artist's rendering of the Oort cloud and the Kuiper belt (inset)

In their 2010 work, Bobylev et al. suggested that Gliese 710 has an 86% chance of passing through the Oort cloud, assuming the Oort cloud to be a spheroid around the Sun with semiminor and semimajor axes of 80,000 and 100,000 AU, respectively. The distance of closest approach of Gliese 710 is generally difficult to compute precisely as it depends sensitively on its current position and velocity; Bobylev et al. estimated that Gliese 710 would pass within 0.311±0.167 parsecs (1.014±0.545 light-years) of the Sun. At the time, there was even a 1-in-10,000 chance of the star penetrating into the region (d < 1,000 AU) where the influence of the passing star on Kuiper belt objects would be significant.

Results from new calculations that include input data from Gaia DR3 indicate that the flyby of Gliese 710 to the Solar System will on average be closer at 0.051 ± 0.003 pc (0.1663 ± 0.0098 ly; 10,520 ± 620 AU) in 1.29±0.04 Myr time, considerably more precise than previous estimates. One 2026 study refined such estimates, giving a closest passage of 0.0621 ± 0.0023 pc (0.2025 ± 0.0075 ly; 12,810 ± 470 AU) in 1.3446±0.0022 Myr. The effects of such an encounter on the orbit of the Pluto–Charon system (and therefore, on the classical trans-Neptunian belt) are negligible, but Gliese 710 will traverse the outer Oort cloud (inside 100,000 AU or 0.48 pc) and reach the outskirts of the inner Oort cloud (inward of 20,000 AU).

Gliese 710 has the potential to perturb the Oort cloud in the outer Solar System, exerting enough force to send showers of comets into the inner Solar System for millions of years, triggering visibility of about ten naked-eye comets per year, and possibly causing an impact event. According to Filip Berski and Piotr Dybczyński, this event will be "the strongest disrupting encounter in the future and history of the Solar System". Earlier dynamic models indicated that the net increase in cratering rate due to the passage of Gliese 710 would be no more than 5%. They had originally estimated that the closest approach would happen in 1.36 million years when the star will approach within 0.337±0.177 parsecs (1.100±0.577 light-years) of the Sun. Gaia DR2 later found the minimum perihelion distance to be 0.0676±0.0157 parsecs or 13,900±3,200 AU, about 1.281 million years from now.

Table of predicted distances and time of Gliese 710 encounter with Sun
Encounter distance		Encounter time (Myr)	Date of prediction	Ref
(pc)	(au)	Encounter time (Myr)	Date of prediction	Ref
0.34±0.18 pc	70,000 ± 37,000 AU	1.36±0.04	1999	
0.311±0.167 pc	64,000 ± 34,000 AU	1.45±0.06	March 2010	
0.0648±0.0303 pc	13,400 ± 6,200 AU	1.35	November 2016	
0.052±0.01 pc	10,700 ± 2,100 AU	1.28±0.05	May 2018	
0.0676±0.0157 pc	13,900 ± 3,200 AU	1.281	May 2018	
0.051±0.003 pc	10,520 ± 620 AU	1.29±0.04	December 2020	
0.052±0.002 pc	10,730 ± 410 AU	1.29±0.02	June 2022	
0.0621±0.0023 pc	12,810 ± 470 AU	1.3446±0.0022	May 2026	

== In popular culture ==
- In 2022, the final track on popular Australian psychedelic rock band King Gizzard & The Lizard Wizard's album Ice, Death, Planets, Lungs, Mushrooms, and Lava was entitled Gliese 710. The song is written entirely in Locrian mode.

== See also ==
- List of nearest stars
