= Gliese 445 =

Star in the constellation Camelopardalis

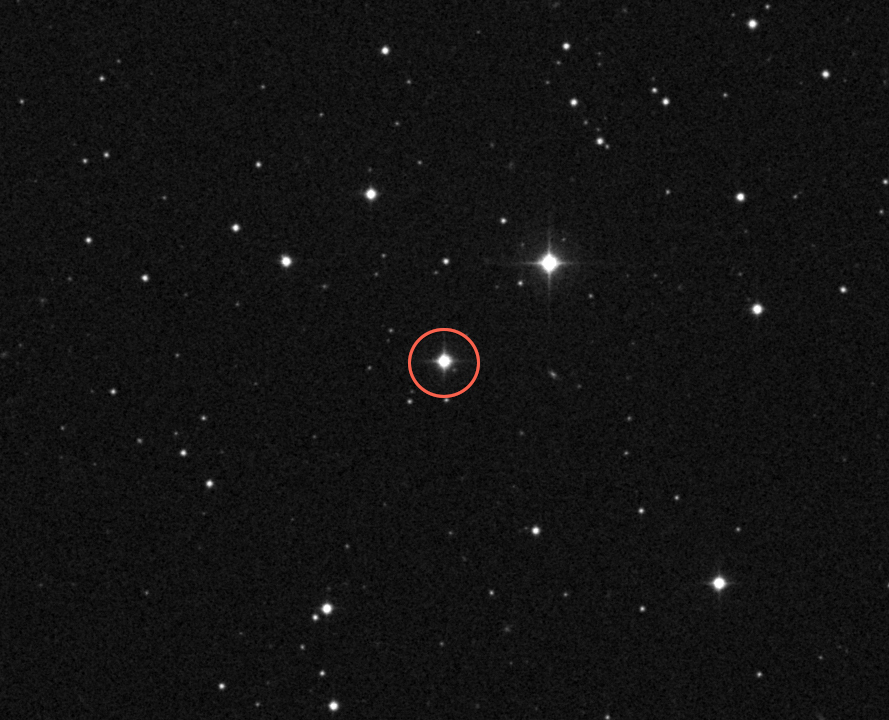
- Image of AC +79 3888 (circled), also known as Gliese 445, located 17.1 light-years from Earth; Credit: Caltech/Palomar

Observation data Epoch J2000 Equinox ICRS
- Constellation: Camelopardalis
- Right ascension: 11^{h} 47^{m} 41.3869^{s}
- Declination: +78° 41′ 28.176″
- Apparent magnitude (V): 10.80

Characteristics
- Evolutionary stage: main sequence
- Spectral type: M4.0Ve
- B−V color index: 1.572

Astrometry
Radial velocity (R_{v})	−111.50±0.15 km/s
Proper motion (μ)	RA: 748.418 mas/yr Dec.: 480.804 mas/yr
Parallax (π)	190.3251±0.0194 mas
Distance	17.137 ± 0.002 ly (5.2542 ± 0.0005 pc)
Absolute magnitude (M_{V})	12.227

Details
Mass	0.24±0.02 M_{☉}
Radius	0.266±0.005 R_{☉}
Luminosity	0.008 L_{☉}
Surface gravity (log g)	4.72 cgs
Temperature	3,356±31 K
Metallicity [Fe/H]	−0.30 dex
Rotational velocity (v sin i)	<2.5 km/s

Other designations
- GJ 445, HIP 57544, AC +79 3888, G 254-29, LFT 849, LHS 2459, LTT 13235, NLTT 28539, PLX 2722

Database references
SIMBAD	data
ARICNS	data
- Location of Gliese 445 in the constellation Camelopardalis

Gliese 445 (Gl 445 or AC +79 3888) is an M-type main sequence star in the northern part of the northern circumpolar constellation of Camelopardalis.

== Location ==
Distances of the nearest stars from 20,000 years ago until 80,000 years in the future

Gliese 445 is currently 17.1 light-years from Earth and has an apparent magnitude of 10.8. It is visible all night long from locations north of the Tropic of Cancer, but not to the naked eye. Because the star is a red dwarf with a mass only a quarter to a third of that of the Sun, scientists question the ability of this system to support life. Gliese 445 is also a known X-ray source.

The Voyager 1 probe will pass within 1.6 light-years of Gliese 445 in about 40,000 years.

== Solar encounter ==
While the Voyager probe moves through space towards a 1.6-light-year minimum distance from Gliese 445, the star is rapidly approaching the Sun. At the time the probe passes Gliese 445, the star will be about 1.059 parsecs (3.45 light-years) from the Sun, but with less than half the brightness necessary to be seen with the naked eye. At that time, Gliese 445 will be approximately tied with Ross 248 for being the closest star to the Sun (see List of nearest stars and brown dwarfs#Distant future and past encounters).

== See also ==
- Lists of stars
