= HD 7977 =

Star in the constellation Cassiopeia

Observation data Epoch J2000.0 Equinox ICRS
- Constellation: Cassiopeia
- Right ascension: 01^{h} 20^{m} 31.596^{s}
- Declination: +61° 52′ 57.01″
- Apparent magnitude (V): 9.04

Characteristics
- Evolutionary stage: main sequence
- Spectral type: G3

Astrometry
| Proper motion (μ) | RA: +0.144 mas/yr Dec.: +0.010 mas/yr |
| Parallax (π) | 13.2118±0.0322 mas |
| Distance | 246.9 ± 0.6 ly (75.7 ± 0.2 pc) |

Details
| Mass | 1.07 M_{☉} |
| Radius | 1.09 R_{☉} |
| Luminosity | 1.20 L_{☉} |
| Surface gravity (log g) | 4.35 cgs |
| Temperature | 5,816 K |
| Metallicity [Fe/H] | −0.59 dex |
| Age | 6.7 Gyr |

Other designations
- HD 7977, BD+61°250, SAO 11703

Database references
| SIMBAD | data |

HD 7977 is a G-type main-sequence star located in the constellation of Cassiopeia, around 246.9 light-years away from Earth. HD 7977 is notable for its uncertain close flyby of the Solar System 2.47 million years ago, when it is predicted to have come as close as 3,800 astronomical units or less, although there are reasons to doubt the proper motions used to compute this flyby. For comparison, Proxima Centauri is roughly 270,000 astronomical units from Earth. Its flyby may have taken it close enough to the Sun that it penetrated deep into the Oort Cloud and disturbed the population of Oort Cloud bodies and long-period comets there. Its mass is equivalent to 1.07 times the Sun's mass.

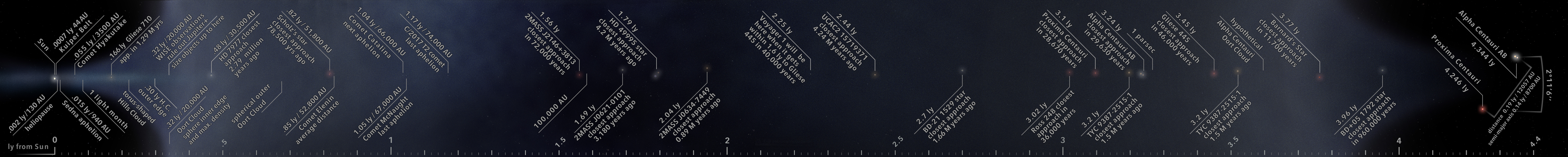
Schematic view to scale of past and future close approaches to the Sun (up to Alpha Centauri), which includes HD 7977
