= Ross 47 =

Star in the constellation Orion

- Location of Ross 47 in the constellation Orion

Observation data Epoch J2000.0 Equinox ICRS
- Constellation: Orion
- Right ascension: 05^{h} 42^{m} 09.26769^{s}
- Declination: +12° 29′ 21.6048″
- Apparent magnitude (V): +11.48 - 11.55

Characteristics
- Evolutionary stage: red dwarf
- Spectral type: M4V
- U−B color index: +14.264
- B−V color index: +13.130
- Variable type: BY Dra

Astrometry
Radial velocity (R_{v})	106.06±0.18 km/s
Proper motion (μ)	RA: +1,997.342 mas/yr Dec.: −1569.63 mas/yr
Parallax (π)	172.6762±0.0286 mas
Distance	18.888 ± 0.003 ly (5.7912 ± 0.0010 pc)
Absolute magnitude (M_{V})	+12.73

Details
Mass	0.218±0.005 M_{☉}
Radius	0.238±0.009 R_{☉}
Luminosity	0.006288±0.000094 L_{☉}
Surface gravity (log g)	4.44 cgs
Temperature	3,334+67 −63 K
Metallicity [Fe/H]	−0.19±0.17 dex
Rotation	170
Rotational velocity (v sin i)	3.1 km/s
Age	7.1 Gyr

Other designations
- V1352 Ori, GJ 213, HIP 26857, Ci 20 344, G 102-22, LFT 425, LHS 31, LTT 11704, NLTT 15489, Ross 47, TYC 722-455-1, 2MASS J05420897+1229252

Database references
SIMBAD	data

Ross 47 is a variable star of spectral type M4 located in the constellation Orion. Based on parallax measurements, it lies 18.888 light-years (5.791 parsecs) from Earth.

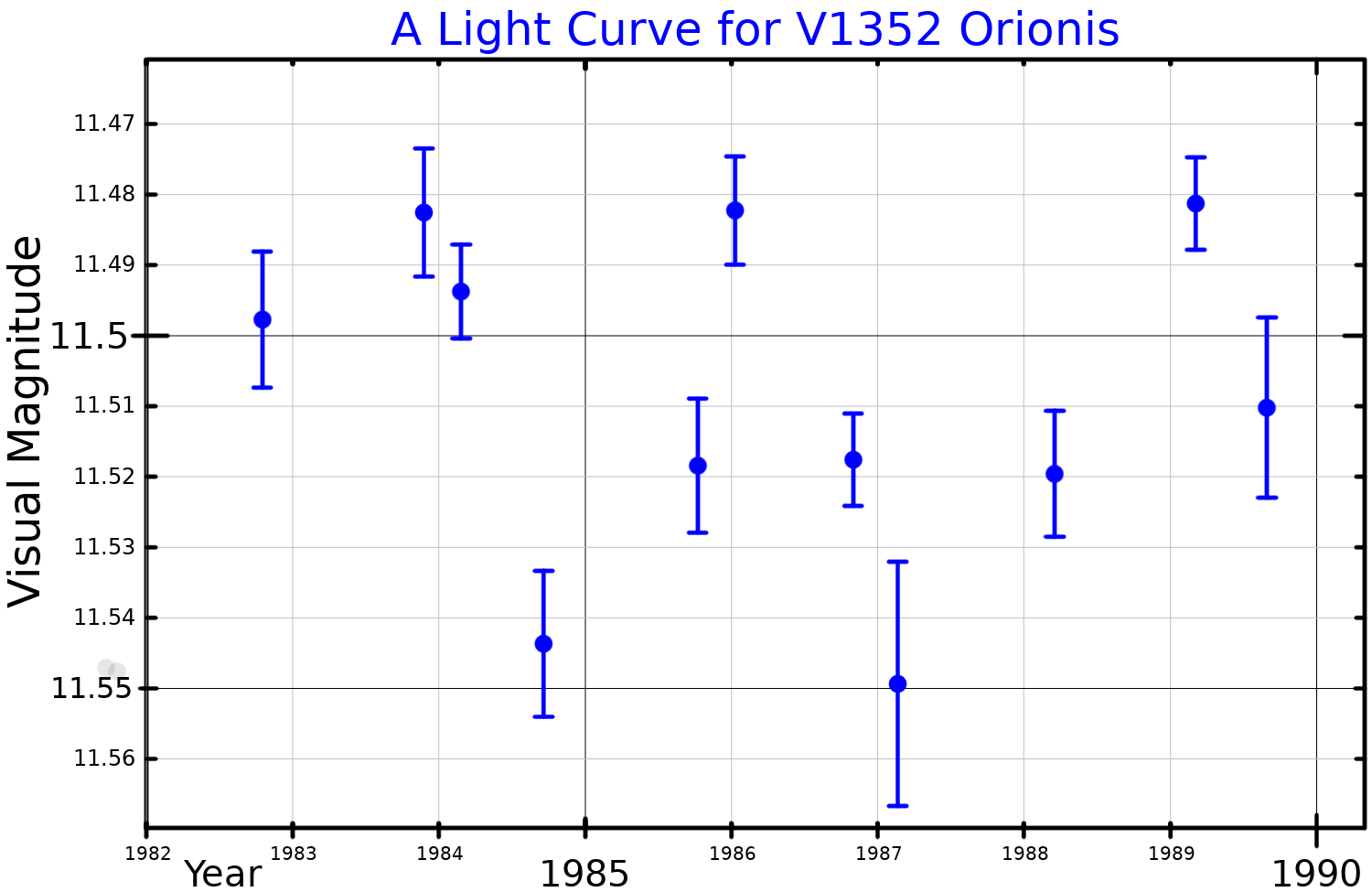
A visual band light curve for V1352 Orionis, adapted from Weis (1994)

Ross 47 is a small red dwarf with 23.8% of the Sun's size, and 6% of its luminosity. Its effective temperature is much cooler than the Sun's, about 3,330 K. It is a BY Draconis variable, a star which whose brightness varies across its rotation, having multiple starspots that contribute to the brightness variation. Its apparent magnitude varies from +11.48 to 11.55. Ross 47 was given the variable star designation V1352 Orionis in 1997.
