= Gliese 205 =

Nearby red dwarf star in the constellation Orion

- Location of Gliese 205 in the constellation Orion

Observation data Epoch J2000 Equinox J2000
- Constellation: Orion
- Right ascension: 05^{h} 31^{m} 27.39578^{s}
- Declination: −03° 40′ 38.0240″
- Apparent magnitude (V): 7.932

Characteristics
- Evolutionary stage: Red dwarf
- Spectral type: M1.5V

Astrometry
Radial velocity (R_{v})	8.26 km/s
Proper motion (μ)	RA: 761.631 mas/yr Dec.: −2092.209 mas/yr
Parallax (π)	175.3131±0.0204 mas
Distance	18.604 ± 0.002 ly (5.7041 ± 0.0007 pc)
Absolute magnitude (M_{V})	9.188

Details
Mass	0.549±0.029 M_{☉}
Radius	0.556±0.033 R_{☉}
Luminosity	0.061±0.006 L_{☉}
Surface gravity (log g)	4.70±0.1 cgs
Temperature	3,770±30 K
Metallicity [Fe/H]	+0.21±0.06 dex
Rotation	34.4±0.5 d
Rotational velocity (v sin i)	0.7±0.1 km/s
Age	3.6+5.0 −1.7 Gyr

Other designations
- BD−03°1123, GJ 205, HD 36395, HIP 25878, LHS 30, SAO 132211, Wolf 1453, W. B. V. 592, Weisse I, 5^{h} 592, Strb. 1611, Cin. 705, Ci 20=334, G 99-15, LFT 416, LTT 2293, NLTT 15215 PLX 1255, TYC 4770-574-1, 2MASS J05312734-0340356

Database references
SIMBAD	data

Gliese 205 is a nearby red dwarf star of spectral type M1.5, located in the constellation Orion at a distance of 18.6 light-years (5.7 parsecs) from Earth.

== History of observations ==
A designation of this star, used in "Discovery Name" column of Table 4 of Kirkpatrick et al. (2012), is Strb. 1611. This name was taken from van de Kamp (1930). The origin of this designation is not explained in these articles. Anyway, it is not Struve's 1827 catalogue of binary stars, since for this catalogue another prefix ("Σ") is used, for example, "Σ 2398", and real Σ 1611 is located in completely different part of the sky. Also, Gliese 205 is not a binary star. In the paper, published in Annales de l'Observatoire de Strasbourg in 1926 an object "N** Strasb. 1611" in "5^{h}" sections was listed, so, possibly, this designation relates to the Observatory of Strasbourg. Possibly, it is the "Catalogue de Strasbourge" of 8204 stars, published in Volume 4 of Annales de l'Observatoire de Strasbourg in 1912 — a part of international Astronomische Gesellschaft Katalog (AGK), made by various observatories by 1912. If so, then there are earlier designations).

Of the other designations, the earliest one is W. B. V. 592 or Weisse I, 5^{h} 592 (Maximiliano Weisse; Friedrich Bessel, Positiones mediae stellarum fixarum I, 1846). This catalogue was based on observations, made by Bessel in 1821–1833 and published in 1822–1838 in Astronomische Beobachtungen auf der königlichen Universitäts-Sternwarte in Königsberg as "Beobachtungen der Sterne, nach Zonen der Abweichung angestellt". Gliese 205, probably, was observed on January 8, 1823 in zone 140 (see the 9th abtheilung (1824), page 55, 2nd column, 33rd string).

== Search for planets ==
In a 2019 preprint, two candidate planets were detected using the radial velocity method, both Neptune-mass with orbital periods of 17 and 270 days. However, a study of this star in 2023 found no evidence of planets, and determined a stellar rotation period of 34.4 days.
