= GJ 3379 =

Nearest star in the constellation Orion

- Location of GJ 3379 in the constellation Orion

Observation data Epoch J2000.0 Equinox ICRS
- Constellation: Orion
- Right ascension: 06^{h} 00^{m} 03.50422^{s}
- Declination: +02° 42′ 23.5926″
- Apparent magnitude (V): +11.307

Characteristics
- Spectral type: M3.5Ve or dM4.0
- B−V color index: 1.667

Astrometry
Radial velocity (R_{v})	+30.228±0.0038 km/s
Proper motion (μ)	RA: +309.146 mas/yr Dec.: −40.368 mas/yr
Parallax (π)	192.0135±0.0310 mas
Distance	16.986 ± 0.003 ly (5.2080 ± 0.0008 pc)
Absolute magnitude (M_{V})	+12.71

Details
Mass	0.2312±0.0058 M_{☉}
Radius	0.2457±0.0078 R_{☉}
Luminosity	0.006329±0.000088 L_{☉}
Luminosity (bolometric)	0.0086 L_{☉}
Surface gravity (log g)	5.10±0.07 cgs
Temperature	3,284±51 K
Metallicity [Fe/H]	−0.12±0.16 dex
Rotation	1.809 d
Rotational velocity (v sin i)	5.8±0.3 km/s

Other designations
- GJ 3379, WDS J06001+0242A, G 99-49, G 106-17, LTT 17897, NLTT 15908, PLX 1383.02, TYC 134-605-1, 2MASS J06000351+0242236

Database references
SIMBAD	data

GJ 3379 (Giclas 99-49) is the nearest star in the constellation Orion, located at a distance of 17 light years from the Sun based on parallax. It is a single star with an apparent visual magnitude of +11.31 and an absolute magnitude of +12.71, therefore, the star is not visible with the naked eye. It is positioned in the upper left part of Orion, to the SSE of Betelgeuse. This star is drifting further away with a radial velocity of +30.0 kilometers per second. In the past, this star had a relatively close encounter with the Solar System. Some 161,000±6,000 years ago, it achieved a minimum distance of 4.08 ± 0.20 ly (1.25 ± 0.06 pc).

== Physical characteristics ==
This star is a small red dwarf with a stellar classification of M3.5V – an M-type main-sequence star. It is much smaller, cooler, and less massive than the Sun, radiating only 0.6% of the Sun's luminosity. This is a very active star that varies in brightness with an amplitude of 0.0074±0.0029 magnitude, modulated by a rapid rotation period of 1.8 days. The magnetic field strength has been measured as 2.3 kG. It is a source of X-ray emission with a luminosity of 9.5×10^{27} erg s^{−1}.

According to the SIMBAD database, the star is classified as an eruptive variable.
