= Gliese 588 =

Star in the constellation Lupus

- Location of Gliese 588 in the constellation Lupus

Observation data Epoch J2000 Equinox ICRS
- Constellation: Lupus
- Right ascension: 15^{h} 32^{m} 12.93231^{s}
- Declination: −41° 16′ 32.1304″
- Apparent magnitude (V): 9.311

Characteristics
- Spectral type: M2.5V
- U−B color index: +1.14
- B−V color index: +1.51

Astrometry
Radial velocity (R_{v})	21.06±0.12 km/s
Proper motion (μ)	RA: -1176.447 mas/yr Dec.: -1030.970 mas/yr
Parallax (π)	168.9965±0.0270 mas
Distance	19.300 ± 0.003 ly (5.9173 ± 0.0009 pc)
Absolute magnitude (M_{V})	10.44

Details
Mass	0.43±0.05 M_{☉}
Radius	0.42±0.03 R_{☉}
Surface gravity (log g)	4.82±0.08 cgs
Temperature	3555±41 K
Metallicity [Fe/H]	0.06±0.08 dex
Rotation	61.3±6.5 d

Other designations
- CD−40 9712, GJ 588, HIP 76074, LHS 397, LTT 6210, TYC 7844-1976-1, 2MASS J15321302-4116314

Database references
SIMBAD	data

Gliese 588 is a nearby red dwarf star of spectral type M2.5, located in the constellation Lupus at 19.30 light-years from Earth. It emits a very stable light flux, with no detectable pulsations.

== History of observations ==
According to Luyten's (1979) (catalogue LHS, as well as NLTT), this object was discovered by Innes. In 1903–1927 Innes was the director of the Union Observatory (UO), South Africa.

However, in the Ci 20 catalogue (see number 934) this star was designated as "CD -40 7021", not "UO". This may indicate that GJ 588 was first catalogued earlier, in the Cordoba Durchmusterung by John M. Thome in 1894. Note: the real CD designation of Gliese 588 is "CD-40 9712", not "CD -40 7021": GJ 588 has a RA of 15 hours, but the real CD -40 7021 has a RA of 11 hours.

== Search for planets ==
In 2019, two planet candidates detected by radial velocity around Gliese 588 were reported in a preprint, among 118 planets around M dwarf stars. These would have minimum masses about 2.4 and 10.3 times that of Earth, and orbit with periods of 5.8 and 206 days. A 2024 study did not find evidence for planets around this star; radial velocity signals with different periods were detected and attributed to intrinsic stellar variability.
