= Ross 248 =

Star in the constellation Andromeda

- Location of Ross 248 in the constellation Andromeda

Observation data Epoch J2000 Equinox ICRS
- Constellation: Andromeda
- Right ascension: 23^{h} 41^{m} 55.03630^{s}
- Declination: +44° 10′ 38.8189″
- Apparent magnitude (V): 12.23 - 12.34

Characteristics
- Evolutionary stage: main sequence
- Spectral type: M6 V
- U−B color index: +1.48
- B−V color index: +1.92
- Variable type: BY Dra

Astrometry
Radial velocity (R_{v})	−77.29±0.19 km/s
Proper motion (μ)	RA: 112.527 mas/yr Dec.: −1,591.650 mas/yr
Parallax (π)	316.4812±0.0444 mas
Distance	10.306 ± 0.001 ly (3.1597 ± 0.0004 pc)
Absolute magnitude (M_{V})	14.79

Details
Mass	0.145 M_{☉}
Radius	0.190 R_{☉}
Luminosity	0.0022 L_{☉}
Surface gravity (log g)	5.13 cgs
Temperature	2,930 K
Metallicity [Fe/H]	+0.23 dex
Rotation	2.07±0.01 days
Rotational velocity (v sin i)	0.1 km/s
Age	2.6 Gyr

Other designations
- HH Andromedae, HH And, 2MASS J23415498+4410407, G 171-010, GCTP 5736.00, GJ 905, LHS 549.

Database references
SIMBAD	data

Ross 248, also called HH Andromedae or Gliese 905, is a red dwarf star approximately 10.30 light-years (3.16 parsecs) from Earth in the northern constellation of Andromeda. Despite its proximity it is too dim to be seen with the naked eye. It was first catalogued by Frank Elmore Ross in 1926 with his second list of proper-motion stars. It was too dim to be included in the Hipparcos survey. In about 40,000 years, Voyager 2 will pass within 1.7 ly (0.52 pc) of Ross 248.

Within the next 80,000 years, Ross 248 is predicted to be the nearest star to the Sun for around 9,000 years, overtaking the current nearest star, the triple system Alpha Centauri.

== Characteristics ==
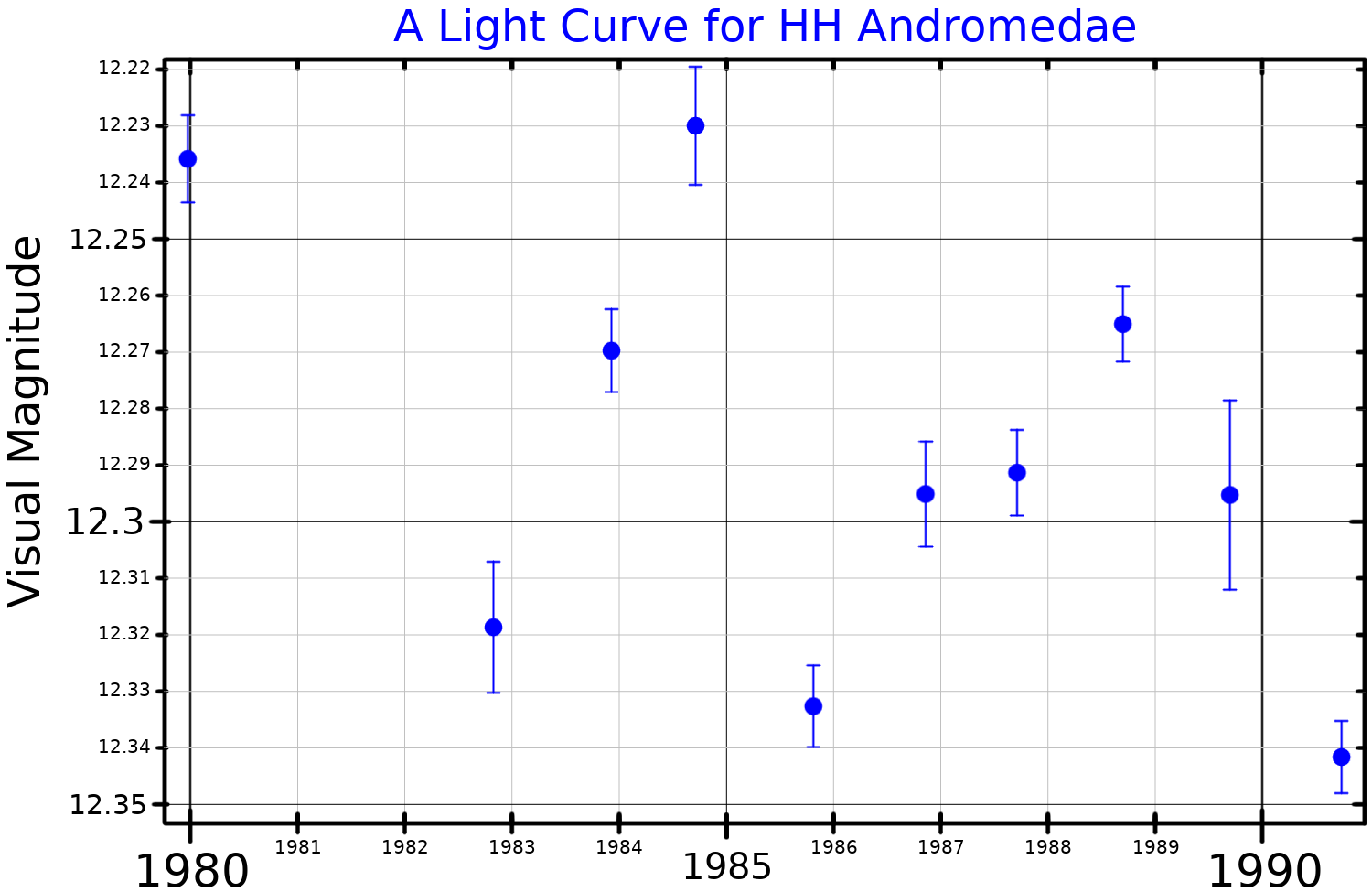
A visual band light curve for HH Andromedae, adapted from Weis (1994)

This star has about 14% of the Sun's mass and 19% of the Sun's radius, but only 0.2% of the Sun's luminosity. It has a stellar classification of M6 V, which indicates it is a type of main-sequence star known as a red dwarf. This is a chromospherically-active star. With high probability, there appears to be a long-term cycle of variability with a period of 4.2 years. This variability causes the star to range in visual magnitude from 12.23 to 12.34. In 1950, this became the first star to have a small variation in magnitude attributed to spots on its photosphere as it rotates, a class known as BY Draconis variables.

Examining the proper motion of Ross 248 has found no evidence of a brown dwarf or stellar companion orbiting between 100–1,400 AU, and other unsuccessful searches have been attempted using both the Hubble Space Telescope Wide Field Planetary Camera and by near-infrared speckle interferometry. Long-term observations by the Sproul Observatory show no astrometric perturbations by any unseen companion.

== Distance from the Sun ==
Distances of the nearest stars from 20,000 years ago until 80,000 years in the future

The space velocity components of this star in the galactic coordinate system are [U, V, W] = [−32.9±0.7, −74.3±1.3, 0.0±1.4] km/s. The trajectory of Ross 248 will bring it closer to the Solar System. In 1993, Matthews projected that in about 33,000 years it would enter a period of about 9,000 years as the closest star to the Sun, as close as 3.024 light-years (0.927 parsecs) in 36,000 years. A more precise estimate in 2022 has it approaching to within 3.048 ly (0.9345 pc) in 36,500 years.

Any future spacecraft that escaped the Solar System with a velocity of 25.4 km/s would reach this star 37,000 years from now, when the star just passes its nearest approach. By comparison, Voyager 1 has an escape velocity of 16.6 km/s.

Voyager 2 is not headed toward any particular star, although in roughly 42,000 years, it will pass Ross 248 at a distance of 1.7 light-years.

The closest stellar neighbors to Ross 248 are the binary systems Groombridge 34, at 1.8 light-years away, and Kruger 60, at 4.5 light-years.

== See also ==
- List of nearest stars
- Lists of stars

== Sources ==
- Riaz, Basmah; Gizis, John E.; Harvin, James (2006). "Identification of New M Dwarfs in the Solar Neighborhood". The Astronomical Journal. 132 (2): 866–872. arXiv:astro-ph/0606617. Bibcode:2006AJ....132..866R. doi:10.1086/505632. S2CID 6282011. Table 1.
- Dittmann, Jason A.; Irwin, Jonathan M.; Charbonneau, David; Berta-Thompson, Zachory K. (2014). "Trigonometric Parallaxes for 1507 Nearby Mid-to-late M Dwarfs". The Astrophysical Journal. 784 (2): 156. arXiv:1312.3241. Bibcode:2014ApJ...784..156D. doi:10.1088/0004-637X/784/2/156. S2CID 18789867. Table with parallaxes.
