= List of star systems within 250–300 light-years =

This is a list of star systems within 250–300 light years of Earth.

== List ==
Key
#	Visible to the unaided eye
$	Bright star (absolute magnitude of +8.5 or brighter)
‡	White dwarf
§	Brown dwarf or sub-brown dwarf
*	Nearest in constellation

System	Star or (sub-) brown dwarf	Distance (ly)	Constellation	Coordinates: RA, Dec (Ep J2000, Eq J2000)	Stellar class	Apparent magnitude (V)	Parallax (mas)	Notes and additional references
Omega Herculis (Cujam)		250 ± 10	Hercules		A2 Vp CrSr	4.5821		
Spica (Alpha Virginis)	A	250 ± 10	Virgo		B1III-IV	+0.97		One of the closest core-collapse supernova candidates to Earth.
Spica (Alpha Virginis)	B	250 ± 10	Virgo		B2V			One of the closest core-collapse supernova candidates to Earth.
Bellatrix (Gamma Orionis)		250 ± 10	Orion		B2 III	1.64		One of the closest core-collapse supernova candidates to Earth, although it is possible Bellatrix will still become a white dwarf instead.
K2-266		252			K			Has 4 confirmed and 2 unconfirmed exoplanets.
HD 17156 (Nushagak)		252.6 ± 0.3	Cassiopeia		F9V	8.16		
Nu Capricorni (Alshat)		253 ± 5	Capricornus		B9 IV or B9.5 V	+4.76		
Alpha Delphini (Sualocin)		254 ± 9	Delphinus		B9 IV	3.777		
HD 75898 (Stribor)		254.6 ± 0.7	Lynx		F8V	8.03		Has two known exoplanets.
Kappa Virginis (Kang)		255 ± 5	Virgo		K2/3 III	4.180		
HJ 2814 A		256 ± 2	Serpens		A0V	5.929±0.010		
TOI-6054 (HD 23074)		256.7±0.4			G0			Has two known exoplanets.
TOI-1453	A	257.288±0.209			K			Has two known exoplanets.
TOI-1453	B	257.288±0.209			M			Has two known exoplanets.
HD 21520		258			G2/3V			Has one known exoplanet.
HD 84406		260			G8IV			
19 Aquarii		260 ± 3	Aquarius		A8V	+5.713		
Eta Andromedae (Kui)	A	260±5	Andromeda	00^{h} 57^{m} 12.400^{s} +23° 25′ 03.54″	G8III-IV	4.403	12.5624±0.2525	
Eta Andromedae (Kui)	B	260±5	Andromeda	00^{h} 57^{m} 12.400^{s} +23° 25′ 03.54″	G8III-IV	4.403	12.5624±0.2525	
Iota Trianguli B		260 ± 10	Triangulum		F5V	6.83		
Zeta Sagittae		260 ± 10	Sagitta		A3 Vnn	+5.00		
13 Comae Berenices		260 ± 20	Coma Berenices		A3 V	5.17		Part of Coma Star Cluster.
Gamma Sextantis		261	Sextans		A2V			
S Antliae		261 ± 1	Antlia		A9V	6.27 to 6.83		
Nu Pegasi		261 ± 7	Pegasus		K4III	4.84		
Alpha Columbae (Phact)		261 ± 8	Columbae		B9Ve or B7 IV	2.645		
Sigma Librae (Brachium)		261.0+5.25 −6.26	Libra		M2.5III	3.20 - 3.46		
Iota Hydrae (Ukdah)		263 ± 3	Hydra		K2.5 III	3.91		
HJ 2814 B		263.5 ± 0.9	Serpens		G0V	8.89		
Chi Andromedae		264±2	Andromeda	01^{h} 39^{m} 20.98857^{s} +44° 23′ 10.2299″	G8III	5.01	12.3592±0.1046	
Upsilon¹ Hydrae (Zhang)		264 ± 6	Hydra		G6/8III	4.12		
LTT 9779 (Uúba)		264.3 ± 0.4	Sculptor		G7V	9.76±0.03		Has 1 confirmed exoplanet (LTT 9779 b/Cuancoá).
14 Comae Berenices		266 ± 5	Coma Berenices		F0p	4.95		Part of Coma Star Cluster.
K2-155		267			K7			Has 3 exoplanets.
14 Aurigae (KW Aurigae)	A	269 ± 4	Auriga		A9IV + ?	5.01		
14 Aurigae (KW Aurigae)	B	269 ± 4	Auriga		F5V			
14 Aurigae (KW Aurigae)	C	269 ± 4	Auriga		M3V:			
14 Aurigae (KW Aurigae)	D	269 ± 4	Auriga		WDA			
K2-384		270			M0V			Has 5 exoplanets.
68 Aquarii (g² Aquarii)		270 ± 4	Aquarius		G8 III	5.24		
Alpha Arae		270 ± 20	Ara		B2 Vne	2.93		
88 Aquarii (c² Aquarii/Safina)		271 ± 5	Aquarius		K1 III	+3.679		
SX Phoenicis		272 ± 1	Phoenix		A2 V	6.76 – 7.53		
HD 73534 (Gakyid)		272.8 ± 0.6			G5 IV	8.23		
62 Andromedae (c Andromedae)$		273 ± 4	Andromeda	02^{h} 19^{m} 16.79693^{s} +47° 22′ 47.9132″	A0V	5.31#	11.9531±0.1640	
Zeta Leonis (Adhafera)		274 ± 4	Leo		F0 III	3.33		
TOI-561		275.6 ± 0.5	Sextans		G9V	10.25		Has 4 confirmed and 1 unconfirmed exoplanets (b,c,d,e & f).
TOI-1136		275.9 ± 0.3			G5	9.534		Has 6 exoplanets.
41 Lyncis (Intercrus)		276 ± 1	Lynx		K0 III	5.39		
12 Comae Berenices	A	276 ± 5	Coma Berenices		F6 III	4.80		Part of Coma Star Cluster.
12 Comae Berenices	B	276 ± 5	Coma Berenices		A3 V			Part of Coma Star Cluster.
Eta Circini		276 ± 7	Circinus		G8 III	5.17		
Theta Circini		276 ± 7	Circinus		B3 Ve	5.110		
Omega² Aquilae		278.9 ± 0.9	Aquila	19^{h} 19^{m} 53.067^{s} +11° 32′ 05.87″	A2V or F0V	6.03	11.6957±0.0366	
AE Aquarii	A	280	Aquarius		WD	11.6		
AE Aquarii	B	280	Aquarius		K4–5 V			
Mimosa (Beta Crucis)		280 ± 20	Crux		B0.5 III	1.25		One of the closest core-collapse supernova candidates to Earth and a likely member of the Scorpius-Centaurus association.
Omicron Piscium (Torcular)		280 ± 20	Pisces		K0 III	4.27		
HD 95086 (Aiolos)		282.0 ± 0.5			A8	7.36		Has one confirmed exoplanet (HD 95086 b/Levantes).
Alpha Sextantis		283	Sextans		A0III			
Chi Tauri	Ba	283 ± 2	Taurus		F8	8.423		
Chi Tauri	Bb	283 ± 2	Taurus		G6			
Chi Tauri	Bc1	283 ± 2	Taurus		K4			
Chi Tauri	Bc2	283 ± 2	Taurus		K4			
99 Aquarii (b² Aquarii)		283 ± 5	Aquarius		K4 III	4.37		
WASP-43 (Gnomon)		284.3 ± 0.4			K7V	12.4		
Theta Aquilae (Antinous)	A	286 ± 6	Aquila		B9.5 III	3.26		
Theta Aquilae (Antinous)	B	286 ± 6	Aquila		B9.5 III			
AM Herculis	A	286.2 ± 0.4	Hercules		WDpec	12.30-15.7		Prototype Star of Polar Cataclysm Variable Stars.
AM Herculis	B	286.2 ± 0.4	Hercules		M4.5V			Prototype Star of Polar Cataclysm Variable Stars.
Gamma Sagittae (Telum)		288 ± 4	Sagitta		M0 III	+3.47		
Iota Trianguli	Aa (Triminus)	289 ± 3	Triangulum		G0 III	5.32		
Iota Trianguli	Ab	289 ± 3	Triangulum		G5 III			
Beta Equulei		289 ± 7	Equuleus		A3 V	5.16		
15 Aquilae		289 ± 9	Aquila	19^{h} 04^{m} 57.67233^{s} −04° 01′ 53.1059″	K1III	5.41		
HD 105841		290			F0III			
58 Hydrae (Solitaire)		290 ± 10	Hydra		K2.5 IIIb Fe-1:	4.42		
101 Aquarii (b³ Aquarii)		290 ± 20	Aquarius		A0 V	4.71		
Beta Cancri (Tarf)		290 ± 30	Cancer		K4III Ba1	3.50 - 3.58		
GALEX J2339–0424		291 ± 2			DABZ			
Alpha Vulpeculae (Anser)		291 ± 3	Vulpecula		M1 III	4.40		
V Cephei		291.6 ± 0.7	Cepheus		A1V	6.57		
Zeta Apodis		293 ± 3	Apus		K2 III	+4.78		
HD 48265 (Nosaxa)		293 ± 6			G5IV/V	8.07		
Sigma Octantis (Polaris Australis)		294 ± 2	Octans		F0 IV	5.47		It is the current Southern Pole star of Earth.
42 Draconis (Fafnir)		295 ± 2	Draco		K1.5 III	4.82		
Chi Tauri		295 ± 4	Taurus		B9V	5.378		
31 Leonis (Yunü)		296 ± 4	Leo		K3.5 IIIb Fe-1:	4.39		
Beta Crateris	A$	296 ± 8	Crater	11^{h} 11^{m} 39.48783^{s} −22° 49′ 33.0593″	A2III	4.61#	11.0358±0.2918	
Beta Crateris	B‡	296 ± 8	Crater	11^{h} 11^{m} 39.48783^{s} −22° 49′ 33.0593″	DA1.4	13.40	11.0358±0.2918	
Upsilon³ Eridani (Beemim)		296 ± 10	Eridanus		K4 III	3.96		
NR Canis Majoris		297 ± 2	Canis Major		F2V	5.60		
System	Star or (sub-) brown dwarf	Distance (ly)	Constellation	Coordinates: RA, Dec (Ep J2000, Eq J2000)	Stellar class	Apparent magnitude (V)	Parallax (mas)	Notes and additional references

== See also ==
- List of star systems within 200–250 light-years
- List of star systems within 300–350 light-years
