= Pi Capricorni =

Star in the constellation Capricornus

- Location of π Capricorni (circled)

Observation data Epoch J2000.0 Equinox J2000.0 (ICRS)
- Constellation: Capricornus
- Right ascension: 20^{h} 27^{m} 19.202^{s}
- Declination: −18° 12′ 42.10″
- Apparent magnitude (V): +5.096

Characteristics
- Spectral type: B8 II-III or B3-5 V
- U−B color index: −0.311
- B−V color index: +0.013

Astrometry
Radial velocity (R_{v})	−13 km/s
Proper motion (μ)	RA: +16.560 mas/yr Dec.: −17.375 mas/yr
Parallax (π)	5.0291±0.1530 mas
Distance	650 ± 20 ly (199 ± 6 pc)
Absolute magnitude (M_{V})	−1.01

Details

π Cap Aa
Mass	5.9±0.1 M_{☉}
Luminosity	238 L_{☉}
Temperature	9,623 K
Rotational velocity (v sin i)	30 km/s
Age	43.4±7.8 Myr

Other designations
- Oculus, π Cap, 10 Cap, BD−18°5685, HD 194636, HIP 100881, HR 7814, SAO 163592, ADS 13860, WDS J20273-1813AB

Database references
SIMBAD	data

Pi Capricorni is a triple star system in the southern constellation of Capricornus. It has the traditional star name Oculus (meaning eye in Latin); Pi Capricorni is its Bayer designation, which is Latinized from π Capricorni and abbreviated Pi Cap or π Cap. This system appears blue-white in hue and is visible to the naked eye as a 5th magnitude star. It is located approximately 650 light-years (200 pc) 660 light years distant from the Sun based on parallax, but is drifting closer with a radial velocity of −13 km/s. The proximity of this star to the ecliptic means it is subject to lunar occultation.

In Chinese, 牛宿 (Niú Su), meaning Ox (asterism), refers to an asterism consisting of π Capricorni, β Capricorni, α^{2} Capricorni, ξ^{2} Capricorni, ο Capricorni and ρ Capricorni. Consequently, the Chinese name for π Capricorni itself is 牛宿四 (Niú Su sì, English: the Fourth Star of Ox.)

The primary member, component A, is a spectroscopic binary whose two components are separated by 0.1 arcseconds. The brighter of the two, component Aa, is a blue-white B-type bright giant or main sequence star with an apparent magnitude of +5.08. It is around 43 million years old with six times the mass of the Sun. The star is radiating 238 times the Sun's luminosity from its photosphere at an effective temperature of 9,623 K. The third member, component B, is an eighth magnitude star at an angular separation of 3.4″ from the primary.
