= Rho Capricorni =

Star in the constellation Capricornus

- Location of ρ Capricorni (circled)

Observation data Epoch J2000.0 Equinox J2000.0 (ICRS)
- Constellation: Capricornus
- Right ascension: 20^{h} 28^{m} 51.615^{s}
- Declination: −17° 48′ 49.26″
- Apparent magnitude (V): +4.78 (4.97 + 6.88)

Characteristics
- Spectral type: F2 IV + G1
- B−V color index: 0.340/0.635

Astrometry
Radial velocity (R_{v})	+18.4 km/s
Proper motion (μ)	RA: −16.889 mas/yr Dec.: −10.579 mas/yr
Parallax (π)	33.2297±0.2146 mas
Distance	98.2 ± 0.6 ly (30.1 ± 0.2 pc)
Absolute magnitude (M_{V})	2.52 + 4.56

Orbit
Period (P)	278 yr
Semi-major axis (a)	1.877″
Eccentricity (e)	0.91
Inclination (i)	113.3°
Longitude of the node (Ω)	162.0°
Periastron epoch (T)	1965.0
Argument of periastron (ω) (secondary)	144.5°

Details

ρ Cap A
Mass	1.52±0.04 M_{☉}
Radius	1.3 R_{☉}
Luminosity	9 L_{☉}
Surface gravity (log g)	4.02±0.03 cgs
Temperature	6,911±63 K
Metallicity [Fe/H]	−0.20±0.05 dex
Rotational velocity (v sin i)	87.7 km/s
Age	1.74±0.15 Gyr

Other designations
- ρ Cap, 11 Cap, BD−18°5689, GJ 791.1, GJ 9696, HD 194943, HIP 101027, HR 7822, SAO 163614, ADS 13887, WDS J20289-1749AB

Database references
SIMBAD	ρ Cap
- ρ Cap A
- ρ Cap B
ARICNS	ρ Cap A
- ρ Cap B

Rho Capricorni is a binary star system in the constellation Capricornus. Its name is a Bayer designation that is Latinized from ρ Capricorni, and abbreviated Rho Cap or ρ Cap. Sometimes, this star is called by the name Bos, meaning the cow in Latin. In Chinese, 牛宿 (Niú Su), meaning Ox (asterism), refers to an asterism consisting of β Capricorni, α^{2} Capricorni, ξ^{2} Capricorni, π Capricorni, ο Capricorni and ρ Capricorni. Consequently, the Chinese name for ρ Capricorni itself is 牛宿六 (Niú Su liù, English: the Sixth Star of Ox.)

This system is visible to the naked eye with a combined apparent visual magnitude of +4.78. The pair orbit each other with a period of 278 years and an eccentricity of 0.91. Based upon an annual parallax shift of 33.23 mas as seen from the Earth, the system is located about 98 light-years (30 pc) distant from the Sun. It is a thin disk population star system that made its closest approach to the Sun about 1.6 million years ago when it came within 12.49 ly (3.830 pc). Based upon its motion through space, this system may be a member of the Ursa Major moving group of stars.

The primary member, component A, is a yellow-white hued, F-type subgiant with an apparent magnitude of 4.97 and a stellar classification of F2 IV. This star has 1.5 times the mass of the Sun and 1.3 times the Sun's radius. It is radiating 9 times as much luminosity of the Sun from its outer atmosphere at an effective temperature of 6,911 K. The companion, component B, has a visual magnitude of 6.88. The mass ratio is 0.539, meaning the secondary is only 53.9% as massive as the primary.
