= Beta Sagittae =

Star in the constellation Sagitta

β Sagittae
- Location of β Sagittae (circled)

Observation data Epoch J2000 Equinox J2000
- Constellation: Sagitta
- Right ascension: 19^{h} 41^{m} 02.93907^{s}
- Declination: +17° 28′ 33.7528″
- Apparent magnitude (V): 4.38

Characteristics
- Spectral type: G8 IIIa CN 0.5
- U−B color index: +0.89
- B−V color index: +1.05
- R−I color index: +0.50

Astrometry
Radial velocity (R_{v})	−22.0±0.3 km/s
Proper motion (μ)	RA: +7.682±0.258 mas/yr Dec.: −32.987±0.279 mas/yr
Parallax (π)	7.7237±0.1941 mas
Distance	420 ± 10 ly (129 ± 3 pc)
Absolute magnitude (M_{V})	−1.39+0.22 −0.20

Details
Mass	3.755±0.050 M_{☉}
Radius	25.7±0.4 R_{☉}
Luminosity	369±11 L_{☉}
Surface gravity (log g)	2.20±0.02 cgs
Temperature	4,990±20 K
Metallicity [Fe/H]	+0.00±0.03 dex
Rotational velocity (v sin i)	9.1±0.7 km/s
Age	129 Myr

Other designations
- Shakh, β Sge, 6 Sagittae, BD+17°4048, FK5 1513, GC 27236, HD 185958, HIP 96837, HR 7488, SAO 105133, PPM 136766

Database references
SIMBAD	data

Beta Sagittae, also named Shakh, is a single star in the northern constellation of Sagitta. It is a faint star but visible to the naked eye with an apparent visual magnitude of 4.38. Based upon an annual parallax shift of 7.7237 mas as seen from the Gaia satellite, it is located 420 light years from the Sun. The star is moving closer to the Sun with a radial velocity of −22 km/s.

This is an evolved red giant with a stellar classification of G8 IIIa CN 0.5. The suffix notation indicates a mild overabundance of the cyanogen molecule in the spectrum. Beta Sagittae is an estimated 129 million years old with 3.755 times the mass of the Sun, and has expanded to 25.7 times the Sun's radius. The star is radiating 369 times the Sun's luminosity from its enlarged photosphere at an effective temperature of 4,990 K.

== Naming ==
Beta Sagittae, Latinized from β Sagittae and abbreviated β Sge, is the star's Bayer designation. This star was part of the ancient Sumerian constellation ŠAḪ (Shakh), the Pig, with Alpha and Beta Sagittae possibly representing the pig's nose. The IAU Working Group on Star Names adopted the name Shakh for this star on 18 June 2026.

In Chinese astronomy, 左旗 (Zuǒ Qí), meaning Left Flag, refers to an asterism consisting of β Sagittae, α Sagittae, δ Sagittae, ζ Sagittae, γ Sagittae, 13 Sagittae, 11 Sagittae, 14 Sagittae and ρ Aquilae. Consequently, the Chinese name for β Sagittae itself is 左旗二 (Zuǒ Qí èr, English: the Second Star of Left Flag.)
