= Rho Aquilae =

Star in the constellation Delphinus

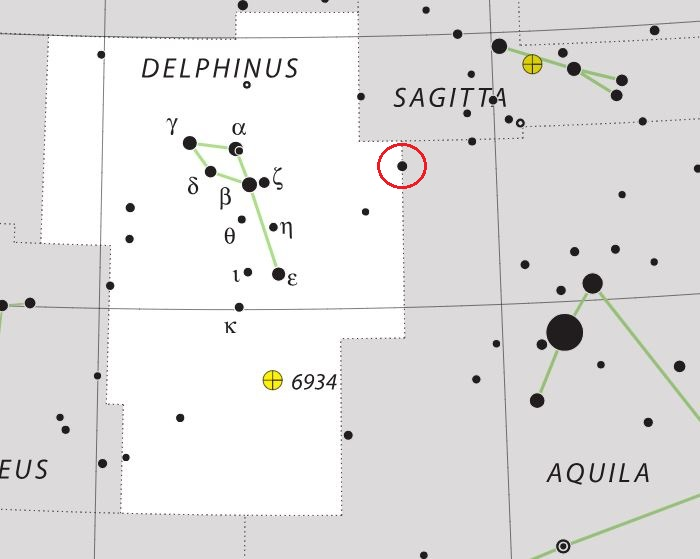
- Location of Rho Aquilae (circled)

Observation data Epoch J2000.0 Equinox ICRS
- Constellation: Delphinus
- Right ascension: 20^{h} 14^{m} 16.619^{s}
- Declination: +15° 11′ 51.386″
- Apparent magnitude (V): 4.94

Characteristics
- Evolutionary stage: main sequence
- Spectral type: A2 V
- U−B color index: +0.01
- B−V color index: +0.09
- Variable type: Constant

Astrometry
Radial velocity (R_{v})	−23.0 km/s
Proper motion (μ)	RA: +55.446 mas/yr Dec.: +57.339 mas/yr
Parallax (π)	20.9054±0.1363 mas
Distance	156 ± 1 ly (47.8 ± 0.3 pc)
Absolute magnitude (M_{V})	+1.63

Details
Mass	1.94±0.04 M_{☉}
Radius	1.95 R_{☉}
Luminosity	22 L_{☉}
Surface gravity (log g)	4.2 cgs
Temperature	8,900±100 K
Metallicity [Fe/H]	−0.21 dex
Rotational velocity (v sin i)	180 km/s
Age	300±100 Myr

Other designations
- ρ Aql, 67 Aquilae, BD+14°4227, FK5 1526, GC 28097, HD 192425, HIP 99742, HR 7724, SAO 105878

Database references
SIMBAD	data

Rho Aquilae is a star in the northern constellation of Delphinus. Its name is a Bayer designation that is Latinized from ρ Aquilae and abbreviated Rho Aql or ρ Aql. This star has an apparent visual magnitude of 4.94, which is bright enough to be seen with the naked eye in good conditions. The annual parallax shift is 20.91 mas, which corresponds to a distance of appropximately 156 light-years (48 parsecs) from the Sun. It is currently drifting closer to the Sun with a line of sight velocity component of 23 km/s.

A relatively high proper motion resulted in the star crossing the border from Aquila into Delphinus in 1992. Rho Aquilae is therefore a rare occurrence of a mismatch between the current constellation and its Bayer designation constellation. The star is seasonally visible to all but the higher southern latitudes.

Rho Aquilae is an A-type main sequence star with a stellar classification of A2 V. It is about 400 million years old with a high rate of spin, showing a projected rotational velocity of 180 km/s. This star has nearly double the mass and radius of the Sun, and is radiating 22 times the luminosity of the Sun from its photosphere at an effective temperature of 8,900 K. It displays an excess emission of infrared radiation that may be explained by a circumstellar disk of dust.

== Chinese constellations and components ==
R. H. Allen's 1899 book Star Names claimed the traditional name Tso Ke for this star, from the Cantonese 左旗 jo keih meaning "the left flag". In Chinese, 左旗 (Zuǒ Qí in Mandarin), within the Ox lunar mansion, refers to an asterism consisting of this star, α, β, γ, δ, ζ, 11, 13, and 14 Sagittae stars of Sagitta to the west. Consequently, ρ Aquilae itself is known as 左旗九 (Zuǒ Qí jiǔ, English: the Ninth Star of Left Flag). The IAU Working Group on Star Names assigned the name Zuoqi to δ Sagittae A in 2026.
