= Delta Sagittae =

Binary star system in the constellation Sagitta

δ Sagittae
- Location of δ Sagittae (circled)

Observation data Epoch J2000 Equinox ICRS
- Constellation: Sagitta
- Right ascension: 19^{h} 47^{m} 23.26653^{s}
- Declination: +18° 32′ 03.5203″
- Apparent magnitude (V): +3.82(3.91/ 6.64)

Characteristics
- Evolutionary stage: AGB + main sequence
- Spectral type: M2II + B9.5V
- U−B color index: +0.98
- B−V color index: +1.40
- Variable type: LB?

Astrometry
Radial velocity (R_{v})	2.5 ± 0.9 km/s
Proper motion (μ)	RA: -6.514 mas/yr Dec.: 0.849 mas/yr
Parallax (π)	5.9674±0.2597 mas
Distance	550 ± 20 ly (168 ± 7 pc)
Absolute magnitude (M_{V})	−2.58

Orbit
Period (P)	3,703.7±1.5 days
Semi-major axis (a)	(5.50±0.04)×10^{8} km (Note: calculated from a sin i divided by the sine of inclination.)
Eccentricity (e)	0.441±0.005
Inclination (i)	40°
Longitude of the node (Ω)	170.2°
Periastron epoch (T)	1979.93
Argument of periastron (ω) (secondary)	263.9±1.0°

Details

δ Sge A
Mass	3.8 M_{☉}
Radius	180±25 R_{☉}
Luminosity	3,162 L_{☉}
Surface gravity (log g)	0.74±0.10 cgs
Temperature	3,660±170 K

δ Sge B
Mass	3.611 M_{☉}
Radius	3.3 – 4.7 R_{☉}
Luminosity	63 L_{☉}
Temperature	10,000 K

Other designations
- Zuoqi, δ Sge, 7 Sge, BD+18 4240, FK5 743, GC 27391, HD 187076, HIP 97365, HR 7536, SAO 105259, PPM 136976, CCDM J19474+1832AB, WDS J19474+1832AB, IDS 19429+1817 AB

Database references
SIMBAD	data

Delta Sagittae, also named Zuoqi, is a binary star in the constellation of Sagitta, with an apparent magnitude of +3.68. The primary component is a red M-type bright giant, and the secondary is a B-type main-sequence star. It is approximately 430 light years from Earth, based on its Gaia Data Release 2 parallax.

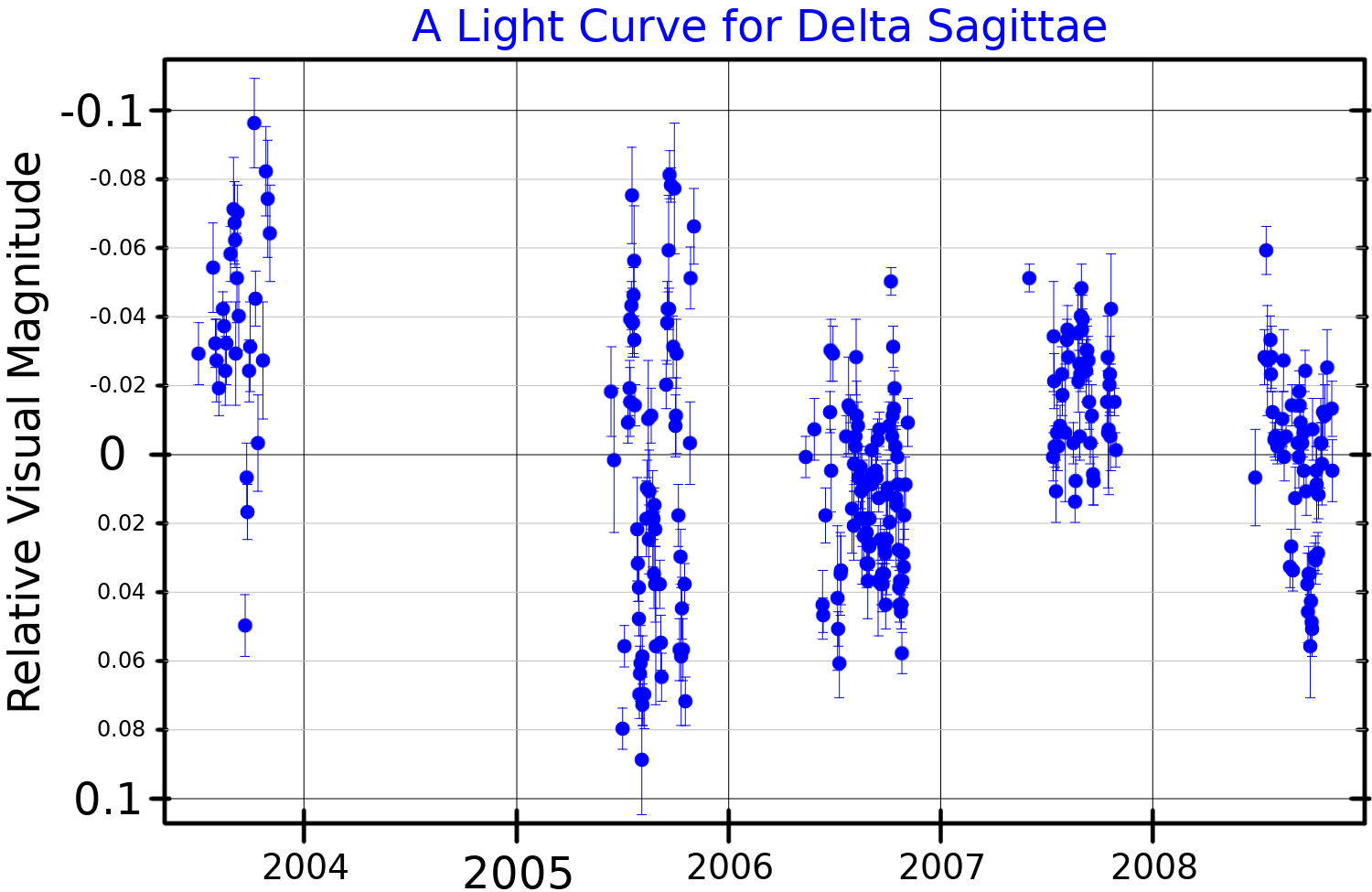
A visual band light curve for Delta Sagittae, plotted from data published by Tabur et al. (2009)

Delta Sagittae is a spectroscopic binary with a composite spectrum, meaning that light from both stars can be detected. It has an orbital period of about 10 years and an eccentricity of about 0.44. It is also a variable star, with its brightness changing between a maximum of magnitude 3.75 and a minimum of 3.83 in an unpredictable way.

Delta Sagittae is moving through the Galaxy at a speed of 9.8 km/s relative to the Sun. Its projected Galactic orbit carries it between 23,800 and 35,300 light years from the center of the Galaxy.

== Naming ==
Delta Sagittae (Latinized from δ Sagittae, abbreviated Delta Sge, δ Sge) is the star's Bayer designation.

In Chinese astronomy, 左旗 (Zuǒ Qí), meaning Left Flag, refers to an asterism consisting of δ Sagittae, α Sagittae, β Sagittae, ζ Sagittae, γ Sagittae, 13 Sagittae, 11 Sagittae, 14 Sagittae and ρ Aquilae. Consequently, the Chinese name for δ Sagittae itself is 左旗三 (Zuǒ Qí sān, English: the Third Star of Left Flag.) The IAU Working Group on Star Names adopted the name Zuoqi for δ Sagittae A on 18 June 2026, after the Chinese constellation.
