= Alpha Sagittae =

Star in the constellation Sagitta

α Sagittae
- Location of α Sagittae (circled)

Observation data Epoch J2000.0 Equinox J2000.0 (ICRS)
- Constellation: Sagitta
- Right ascension: 19^{h} 40^{m} 05.79185^{s}
- Declination: +18° 00′ 50.0046″
- Apparent magnitude (V): +4.38

Characteristics
- Evolutionary stage: Red clump
- Spectral type: G1 II
- B−V color index: 0.777±0.014

Astrometry
Radial velocity (R_{v})	+1.72±0.16 km/s
Proper motion (μ)	RA: +14.630±0.257 mas/yr Dec.: −20.160±0.276 mas/yr
Parallax (π)	8.5307±0.1848 mas
Distance	382 ± 8 ly (117 ± 3 pc)
Absolute magnitude (M_{V})	−0.96

Details
Mass	2.95 M_{☉}
Radius	17.89±0.57 R_{☉}
Luminosity	340 L_{☉}
Surface gravity (log g)	2.36±0.07 cgs
Temperature	5,630±45 K
Metallicity [Fe/H]	+0.03±0.06 dex
Rotational velocity (v sin i)	10 km/s
Age	151 Myr

Other designations
- Sham, Alsahm, α Sge, 5 Sagittae, BD+17°4042, FK5 1133, GC 27215, HD 185758, HIP 96757, HR 7479, SAO 105120, PPM 136737, CCDM J19401+1801A, WDS J19401+1801A

Database references
SIMBAD	data

Alpha Sagittae, formally named Sham /ˈʃæm/, is a single star in the northern constellation of Sagitta. Alpha Sagittae is the Bayer designation, which is latinized from α Sagittae and abbreviated Alpha Sge or α Sge. It is visible to the naked eye as a yellow-hued star with an apparent visual magnitude of +4.38. Despite the name, this is not the brightest star in the constellation – that distinction belongs to Gamma Sagittae. Based upon parallax measurements, Alpha Sagittae is approximately 382 light-years from the Sun. It is moving further away from the Earth with a heliocentric radial velocity of 1.7 km/s.

This is an evolved bright giant with a stellar classification of G1 II. It is 151 million years old with 2.95 times the mass of the Sun and has expanded to around 17.9 times the Sun's radius. It is radiating 340 times the Sun's luminosity from its enlarged photosphere at an effective temperature of 5,630 K. There is an X-ray source within 12″ of these coordinates.

The evolutionary state of Alpha Sagittae has been historically unclear. Its temperature and luminosity place it within the Hertzsprung gap, a region of the H-R diagram where stars more massive than the sun are evolving rapidly away from the main sequence towards becoming red giants. However, the chemical composition of its surface indicates that it has already experienced the first dredge-up of fusion products that occurs soon after a star reaches the red giant branch. It also lies within the Cepheid instability strip, but is not a Cepheid variable. It belongs to a small group of known stars that have been called carbon-deficient red giants and may have experienced binary mass exchanges. A 2025 publication concluded that the star is on the horizontal branch, based on its location on the temperature-surface gravity diagram and abundances of carbon and oxygen.

== Nomenclature ==
This star bore the traditional name Sham (or Alsahm), which derives from the Arabic word سهم sahm, meaning "arrow", the name formerly having been applied to the whole constellation. In 2016, the International Astronomical Union organized a Working Group on Star Names (WGSN) to catalogue and standardize proper names for stars. The WGSN approved the name Sham for this star on 12 September 2016 and it is now so included in the List of IAU-approved Star Names.

In Chinese, 左旗 (Zuǒ Qí), meaning Left Flag, refers to an asterism consisting of Alpha Sagittae, Beta Sagittae, Delta Sagittae, Zeta Sagittae, Gamma Sagittae, 13 Sagittae, 11 Sagittae, 14 Sagittae and Rho Aquilae. Consequently, the Chinese name for Alpha Sagittae itself is 左旗一 (Zuǒ Qí yī, English: the First Star of Left Flag).
