= Alpha Capricorni =

Optical double star in the constellation Capricorn

Alpha Capricorni (α Capricorni, abbreviated Alpha Cap, α Cap) is an optical double star in the constellation of Capricornus. The two physically unrelated components are designated:

- α^{1} Capricorni
- α^{2} Capricorni (also named Algedi).

They are separated by 0.11° on the sky, and resolvable with the naked eye, similar to Mizar and Alcor. α¹ Capricorni is fainter (apparent magnitude 4.27) than α² Capricorni (apparent magnitude 3.58).

== Nomenclature ==
α Capricorni (Latinised to Alpha Capricorni) is the system's Bayer designation; α^{1} and α^{2} Capricorni, those of the two components.

Alpha Capricorni bore the traditional names Algedi, Algiedi, Al Giedi or Giedi, derived from the Arabic الجدي al-jady "the billy goat" or "kid". It also refers to the entire constellation of Capricornus. Giedi is sometimes also associated with Beta Capricorni. α^{1} and α^{2} Capricorni were also called Prima Giedi and Secunda Giedi, respectively. In 2016, the International Astronomical Union organized a Working Group on Star Names (WGSN) to catalogue and standardize proper names for stars. The WGSN approved the name Algedi for α^{2} Capricorni on 21 August 2016 and it is now so entered in the IAU Catalog of Star Names.

Alpha Capricorni is known as 牛宿二 (the Second Star of the Ox) in Chinese astronomy.
