= 11 Sagittae =

Star in the constellation Sagitta

- Location of 11 Sagittae (circled)

Observation data Epoch J2000.0 Equinox ICRS
- Constellation: Sagitta
- Right ascension: 19^{h} 57^{m} 45.44547^{s}
- Declination: +16° 47′ 20.9781″
- Apparent magnitude (V): 5.53

Characteristics
- Evolutionary stage: main sequence
- Spectral type: B9III

Astrometry
| Radial velocity (R_{v}) | −26.10±1.6 km/s |
| Proper motion (μ) | RA: 11.609 mas/yr Dec.: 18.605 mas/yr |
| Parallax (π) | 7.5596±0.0600 mas |
| Distance | 431 ± 3 ly (132 ± 1 pc) |
| Absolute magnitude (M_{V}) | −0.18 |

Details
| Mass | 2.47 M_{☉} |
| Radius | 4.02 R_{☉} |
| Luminosity | 127 L_{☉} |
| Surface gravity (log g) | 3.62 cgs |
| Temperature | 9,661 K |
| Metallicity [Fe/H] | 0.0 dex |
| Rotational velocity (v sin i) | 34 km/s |
| Age | 242 Myr |

Other designations
- 11 Sge, BD+16°4081, HD 189090, HIP 98234, HR 7622, SAO 105471

Database references
| SIMBAD | data |

11 Sagittae is a blue giant in the constellation Sagitta with a spectral type of B9III.

== Naming ==
It is in the Chinese asterism 左旗 (Zuǒ Qí), or Left Flag which consists of 11 Sagittae, γ Sagittae, α Sagittae, β Sagittae, δ Sagittae, ζ Sagittae, 13 Sagittae, 14 Sagittae and ρ Aquilae. Consequently, the Chinese name for γ Sagittae itself is 左旗七 (Zuǒ Qí qī, English: the Seventh Star of Left Flag).
