= Xi Capricorni =

The Bayer designation Xi Capricorni (ξ Cap, ξ Capricorni) is shared by two star systems, in the constellation Capricornus:

- ξ¹ Capricorni
- ξ² Capricorni, being the brighter of the two, often simply called ξ Capricorni

They are separated by 0.25° in the sky.
