= Gamma Sagittae =

Red giant star in the constellation Sagitta

γ Sagittae
- Location of γ Sagittae (circled)

Observation data Epoch J2000.0 Equinox J2000.0 (ICRS)
- Constellation: Sagitta
- Right ascension: 19^{h} 58^{m} 45.42823^{s}
- Declination: +19° 29′ 31.7261″
- Apparent magnitude (V): +3.47

Characteristics
- Evolutionary stage: Red giant branch
- Spectral type: M0 III
- U−B color index: +1.93
- B−V color index: +1.57

Astrometry
Radial velocity (R_{v})	−34.0±0.2 km/s
Proper motion (μ)	RA: +65.005 mas/yr Dec.: +22.72 mas/yr
Parallax (π)	11.3375±0.1652 mas
Distance	288 ± 4 ly (88 ± 1 pc)
Absolute magnitude (M_{V})	−1.11

Details
Mass	0.88+0.05 −0.02 M_{☉} 0.9±0.2 M_{☉} 1.3±0.4 M_{☉} 1.77 M_{☉}
Radius	57.71+0.86 −0.88 R_{☉}
Luminosity (bolometric)	697±30 L_{☉}
Surface gravity (log g)	1.06±0.04 cgs
Temperature	3,904±30 K
Metallicity [Fe/H]	−0.26±0.06 dex
Age	2.35 Gyr

Other designations
- Telum, γ Sge, 12 Sagittae, BD+19°4229, FK5 752, GC 27672, HD 189319, HIP 98337, HR 7635, SAO 105500, PPM 137344

Database references
SIMBAD	data

Gamma Sagittae, also named Telum, is the brightest star in northern constellation of Sagitta. A single star, it is visible to the naked eye with an apparent visual magnitude of +3.47. Based upon an annual parallax shift of 12.62 mas as seen from Earth, it is located about 288 light-years from the Sun. It is moving closer to the Sun with a radial velocity of −34 km/s.

This is a red giant star with a stellar classification of M0 III. It is most likely (94% chance) on the red-giant branch of its evolutionary lifespan, fusing hydrogen along a shell to generate energy. The star is around 2.35 billion years old with roughly 58 times the Sun's radius. Mass estimates range from 0.9 to 1.8 times the mass of the Sun. It is radiating nearly 700 times the Sun's luminosity from its enlarged photosphere at an effective temperature of 3,904 K.

== Nomenclature ==
γ Sagittae (Latinised to Gamma Sagittae) is the system's Bayer designation. Telum, meaning "dart" in Latin, is a historical name for the constellation Sagitta. The name appears in astronomical sources throughout the last millennium, including the first printed star map, published by Albrecht Dürer in 1515, where Telum was used as the constellation label. In his Uranometria (1603), Johann Bayer also gave Telum as an alternative name for the constellation. On 18 June 2026, the IAU Working Group on Star Names (WGSN) approved Telum as the proper name of γ Sagittae.

In Chinese, 左旗 (Zuǒ Qí), meaning Left Flag, refers to an asterism consisting of γ Sagittae, α Sagittae, β Sagittae, δ Sagittae, ζ Sagittae, 13 Sagittae, 11 Sagittae, 14 Sagittae and ρ Aquilae. Consequently, the Chinese name for γ Sagittae itself is 左旗五 (Zuǒ Qí wǔ, English: the Fifth Star of Left Flag).
