= Alpha2 Capricorni =

Star in the constellation Capricornus

Alpha^{2} Capricorni
- Location of the α Capricorni pair in the red circle

Observation data Epoch J2000.0 Equinox J2000.0 (ICRS)
- Constellation: Capricornus
- Right ascension: 20^{h} 18^{m} 03.25595^{s}
- Declination: −12° 32′ 41.4684″
- Apparent magnitude (V): +3.57

Characteristics
- Spectral type: G8.5III-IV
- U−B color index: +0.69
- B−V color index: +0.94

Astrometry
Radial velocity (R_{v})	−0.47±0.47 km/s
Proper motion (μ)	RA: +62.63 mas/yr Dec.: +2.66 mas/yr
Parallax (π)	31.9795±0.3485 mas
Distance	102 ± 1 ly (31.3 ± 0.3 pc)
Absolute magnitude (M_{V})	+0.98+0.07 −0.06

Details

α^{2} Cap A
Mass	2.05±0.29 M_{☉}
Radius	8.38±0.58 R_{☉}
Luminosity	40.4±2.2 L_{☉}
Surface gravity (log g)	3.0 cgs
Temperature	5,030±160 K
Metallicity [Fe/H]	−0.15±0.10 dex
Rotational velocity (v sin i)	2.7 km/s
Age	1.30±1.04 Gyr

Other designations
- Gredi, Algedi, Secunda Giedi, Algiedi Secunda, α^{2} Cap, 6 Cap, BD−12°5685, FK5 761, HD 192947, HIP 100064, HR 7754, SAO 163427, ADS 13645, WDS J20181-1233A,BC

Database references
SIMBAD	data

Alpha^{2} Capricorni is a triple star system in the southern constellation of Capricornus. It has the proper name Algedi, pronounced /ælˈdʒiːdi/; Alpha^{2} Capricorni is its Bayer designation. This system is visible to the naked eye as a point of light with an apparent visual magnitude of +3.57. It is separated from the fainter α¹ Capricorni by 0.11° of the sky, a gap just resolvable with the naked eye, similar to Mizar and Alcor. Based on parallax measurements, the star is approximately 101 light-years (31 pc) away from the Sun.

== Properties ==
The primary, component A, is an evolved G-type star with a stellar classification of G8.5III-IV, indicating that the spectrum displays mixed traits of a giant and subgiant star. At the age of 1.3 billion years, is currently on the red giant branch and is generating energy through hydrogen fusion along a shell surrounding an inert helium core. The star has around double the mass of the Sun and has expanded to more than eight times the Sun's radius. It is radiating 40 times the solar luminosity from its photosphere at an effective temperature of 5,030 K.

The secondary components B and C form a binary system that orbit each other with a period of about 244 years. Both stars have masses about half that of the Sun. They orbit the primary with an estimated period of around 1,500 years. As of 2010, the pair lies at an angular separation of 6.6 arc seconds from the primary along a position angle of 196°.

== Nomenclature ==
α² Capricorni (Latinised to Alpha² Capricorni) is the star's Bayer designation, which is abbreviated Alpha^{2} Cap or α^{2} Cap. It bore the traditional names Secunda Giedi or Algiedi Secunda and shared the name Algedi (from the Arabic الجدي al-jadii 'the goat') with α¹ Capricorni. In 2016, the International Astronomical Union organized a Working Group on Star Names (WGSN) to catalogue and standardize proper names for stars. The WGSN approved the name Algedi for α² Capricorni on 21 August 2016 and it is now so entered in the IAU Catalog of Star Names.

In Chinese, 牛宿 (Niú Xiù), meaning Ox (asterism), refers to an asterism consisting of α² Capricorni, Beta Capricorni, ξ² Capricorni, Pi Capricorni, Omicron Capricorni and Rho Capricorni. Consequently, α² Capricorni itself is known as 牛宿二 (Niú Xiù èr, the Second Star of Ox.)
