= Zeta Sagittae =

Star in the constellation Sagitta

- Location of ζ Sagittae (circled)

Observation data Epoch J2000.0 Equinox J2000.0 (ICRS)
- Constellation: Sagitta
- Right ascension: 19^{h} 48^{m} 58.65978^{s}
- Declination: +19° 08′ 31.3516″
- Apparent magnitude (V): +5.00 (5.64 + 6.04 + 9.01)

Characteristics
- Spectral type: A3 Vnn (A1 V + A3 V)
- U−B color index: +0.06
- B−V color index: +0.10

Astrometry
Proper motion (μ)	RA: +17.63 mas/yr Dec.: +26.27 mas/yr
Parallax (π)	12.79±0.67 mas
Distance	260 ± 10 ly (78 ± 4 pc)
Absolute magnitude (M_{V})	+0.55

Orbit
Period (P)	8487.9±4.9 d
Semi-major axis (a)	0.13605±0.00044″
Eccentricity (e)	0.7948±0.0019
Inclination (i)	132.33±0.41°
Longitude of the node (Ω)	340.97±0.68°
Periastron epoch (T)	44199.6±5.9 HMJD
Argument of periastron (ω) (secondary)	355.3±1.0°

Details

ζ Sge A
Mass	1.80 M_{☉}
Radius	1.7 R_{☉}
Luminosity	46 L_{☉}
Surface gravity (log g)	3.89 cgs
Temperature	8,422±286 K
Rotational velocity (v sin i)	240 km/s
Age	347 Myr

Other designations
- ζ Sge, 8 Sge, BD+19°4229, GC 27431, HD 187362, HIP 97496, HR 7546, SAO 105298, PPM 137034, ADS 12973, WDS J19490+1909AB

Database references
SIMBAD	data

Zeta Sagittae (ζ Sagittae) is triple star system in the northern constellation of Sagitta. It is visible to the naked eye, having a combined apparent visual magnitude of +5.00. Based upon an annual parallax shift of 12.79 mas, the distance to this star is approximately 260 light years.

The inner pair is a visual binary system consisting of two A-type main-sequence stars with an orbital period of 23.2 years (8,487.9 d), a semimajor axis of 0.136 arc seconds, and an eccentricity of 0.79. The primary, component A, has a visual magnitude of 5.64 with a stellar classification of A3 Vnn, where the 'nn' suffix indicates "nebulous" lines due to rotation. It is spinning rapidly with a projected rotational velocity of 240 km/s. This is giving the star an oblate shape with an equatorial bulge that is 14% larger than the polar radius.

The secondary member, component B, is a magnitude 6.04 star, while the more distant component C is magnitude 9.01 and lies at an angular separation of 8.330 arc seconds from the other two.

== Naming ==
In Chinese, 左旗 (Zuǒ Qí), meaning Left Flag, refers to an asterism consisting of ζ Sagittae, α Sagittae, β Sagittae, δ Sagittae, γ Sagittae, 13 Sagittae, 11 Sagittae, 14 Sagittae and ρ Aquilae. Consequently, the Chinese name for ζ Sagittae itself is 左旗四 (Zuǒ Qí sì, English: the Fourth Star of Left Flag.)
