= Y Sagittae =

The Bayer designation y Sagittae and the variable star designation Y Sagittae are distinct. Due to technical limitations, both designations link here. For the star

- Y Sagittae, a Mira variable
- y Sagittae, (14 Sagittae), a designation by John Flamsteed.
