= Beta Capricorni =

Star system in the constellation Capricornus

β Capricorni
- Beta Capricorni circled on a chart of Capricorn; the map is to be held up as with most sky maps so that the right of page is west.

Observation data Epoch J2000.0 Equinox ICRS
- Constellation: Capricornus
- β^{1} Cap
- Right ascension: 20^{h} 21^{m} 00.6666^{s}
- Declination: −14° 46′ 53.067″
- Apparent magnitude (V): +3.05
- β^{2} Cap
- Right ascension: 20^{h} 20^{m} 46.5479^{s}
- Declination: −14° 47′ 05.604″
- Apparent magnitude (V): +6.09

Characteristics

β^{1} Cap
- Spectral type: K0II+B8V
- U−B color index: +0.27
- B−V color index: +0.79

β^{2} Cap
- Evolutionary stage: main sequence
- Spectral type: A0III
- U−B color index: −0.11
- B−V color index: −0.02

Astrometry

β^{1} Cap
| Radial velocity (R_{v}) | −19.0±0.6 km/s |
| Proper motion (μ) | RA: +44.133 mas/yr Dec.: +0.360 mas/yr |
| Parallax (π) | 8.3966±0.6348 mas |
| Distance | 390 ± 30 ly (119 ± 9 pc) |
| Absolute magnitude (M_{V}) | −2.03 |

β^{2} Cap
| Proper motion (μ) | RA: +44.411 mas/yr Dec.: −0.637 mas/yr |
| Parallax (π) | 9.8983±0.3071 mas |
| Distance | 330 ± 10 ly (101 ± 3 pc) |
| Absolute magnitude (M_{V}) | +1.03 |

Orbit
| Primary | Aa |
| Name | Ab |
| Period (P) | 3.762 yr |
| Semi-major axis (a) | 0.049″ |
| Eccentricity (e) | 0.452 |
| Inclination (i) | 75.1° |
| Semi-amplitude (K_{1}) (primary) | 22.4 km/s |
| Semi-amplitude (K_{2}) (secondary) | 19.6 km/s |

Orbit
| Primary | Ab1 |
| Name | Ab2 |
| Period (P) | 8.677 days |
| Eccentricity (e) | 0.340 |
| Semi-amplitude (K_{1}) (primary) | 35.1 km/s |

Orbit
| Primary | Ba |
| Name | Bb |
| Period (P) | 400 yr |
| Semi-major axis (a) | 0.689″ |
| Eccentricity (e) | 0.458 |
| Inclination (i) | 125.2° |

Details

β^{1} Cap Aa
| Mass | 3.69±0.20 M_{☉} |
| Radius | 31.4 R_{☉} |
| Luminosity | 501 L_{☉} |
| Temperature | 4,870 K |
| Age | 230 Myr |

β Cap Ab1
| Mass | 4.22 M_{☉} |
| Luminosity | 112 L_{☉} |
| Age | 230 Myr |

β Cap Ab2
| Mass | 0.94 M_{☉} |
| Age | 230 Myr |

β Cap Ba
| Mass | 2.76+0.50 −0.51 M_{☉} |
| Radius | 2.36+0.06 −0.07 R_{☉} |
| Luminosity | 55+0.19 −0.18 L_{☉} |
| Surface gravity (log g) | 4.17+0.71 −0.70 cgs |
| Temperature | 11,188+30 −20 K |
| Metallicity [Fe/H] | 0.79+0.10 −0.09 dex |
| Age | 230 Myr |

β Cap Bb
| Mass | 1.23 M_{☉} |
| Age | 230 Myr |

Other designations
- Dabih, β Cap, 9 Capricorni, FK5 762, WDS J20210-1447AB
- β^{1} Cap: Dabih Major, BD−15°5629, HD 193495, HIP 100345, HR 7776, WDS J20210-1447A
- β^{2} Cap: Dabih Minor, BD−15°5626, HD 193452, HIP 100325, HR 7775, WDS J20210-1447B

Database references
| SIMBAD | β^{1} Cap |
- β^{2} Cap

Beta Capricorni is a multiple star system in the constellation of Capricornus. Its name is a Bayer designation that is Latinized from β Capricorni, and abbreviated Beta Cap or β Cap. Based on Parallax measurements, it is located at a distance of approximately 390 light years from the Sun. The system is drifting closer with a line of sight velocity of −19 km/s. Because it is positioned near the ecliptic, Beta Capricorni can be occulted by the Moon, and also (rarely) by planets.

The system is believed to consist of five stars. With binoculars or a small telescope, Beta Capricorni can be resolved into a binary pair. The brighter of the two is designated Beta^{1} Capricorni or Beta Capricorni A; the dimmer, Beta^{2} Capricorni or Beta Capricorni B. Both are themselves made up of multiple stars. Beta^{1} Capricorni has three components: a single star designated Beta Capricorni Aa (formally named Dabih /ˈdeɪbiː/, the traditional name of the system) and a binary pair, Beta Capricorni Ab (whose two components are designated Beta Capricorni Ab1 and Ab2). Beta^{2} Capricorni is also a binary pair, with components designated Beta Capricorni Ba and Bb.

Two other nearby stars were discovered by John Herschel. Sometimes referred to as Beta Capricorni D and E, it is unclear whether they are simply optical doubles or part of the Beta Capricorni system.

== Nomenclature ==
β Capricorni (Latinised to Beta Capricorni) is the system's Bayer designation; β^{1} and β^{2} Capricorni those of its two constituents. The designations of the two constituents as Beta Capricorni A and B, and those of the sub-components - Beta Capricorni Aa, Ab, Ab1, Ab2, Ba and Bb - derive from the convention used by the Washington Multiplicity Catalog (WMC) for multiple star systems, and adopted by the International Astronomical Union (IAU).

Beta Capricorni bore the traditional name Dabih, deriving from the Arabic الذابح al-dhābiḥ "the butcher", with Beta^{1} and Beta^{2} subsequently named Dabih Major and Dabih Minor, respectively. In 2016, the IAU organized a Working Group on Star Names (WGSN) to catalogue and standardize proper names for stars. The WGSN decided to attribute proper names to individual stars rather than entire multiple systems. It approved the name Dabih for the component Beta Capricorni Aa on 21 August 2016 and it is now so included in the List of IAU-approved Star Names.

In Chinese, 牛宿 (Niú Su), meaning Ox (asterism), refers to an asterism consisting of Beta Capricorni, Alpha^{2} Capricorni, Xi^{2} Capricorni, Pi Capricorni, Omicron Capricorni and Rho Capricorni. Consequently, the Chinese name for Beta Capricorni itself is 牛宿一 (Niú Su yī, English: the First Star of Ox).

== Properties ==
Beta^{1} Capricorni is the brighter of the two components with an apparent magnitude of +3.05, while the dimmer Beta^{2} Capricorni has an apparent magnitude of +6.09. The two components are separated by 3.5 arcminutes on the sky, putting them at least 21,000 AU (0.34 light-years) apart. If gravitationally bound, they would take around a million years to complete one orbit.

Aa
Sep. = 0.05″
Ab1
Period = 8.7d
Ab2
Ba
Sep. = 3″
Bb

Hierarchy of orbits in the β Capricorni system

=== Beta^{1} Capricorni ===
Beta^{1} Capricorni is the more complex of the pair and has a spectrum that is difficult to interpret. Its dominant pair of stars are the orange K-type bright giant Beta Capricorni Aa, and the close binary system Beta Capricorni Ab. They are separated by 0.04 arcseconds (5 AU) and have an orbital period of 3.77 years. Beta^{1} Capricorni is sufficiently close to the ecliptic to be occulted by the Moon.

The Aa component has a surface temperature of 4,900 K, a radius 35 times that of the Sun, and a luminosity 600 times that of the Sun. The Ab1 and Ab2 components are separated by about 0.1 au and complete an orbit around each other every 8.68 days. The Ab1 component is a B-type main-sequence star, while Ab2 does not have a published spectral class, but is estimated to have 0.94 times the mass of the Sun.

=== Beta^{2} Capricorni ===
Beta^{2} Capricorni is a simpler single-lined spectroscopic binary. The visible component, Beta Capricorni Ba, is an A-type star with 40 times the luminosity of the Sun. The companion, Beta Capricorni Bb, is approximately 3 arcseconds from Ba and has a mass slightly higher than the Sun. Ba is classified as a mercury-manganese star, a chemically peculiar star with unusually strong mercury and manganese lines in its spectrum.

Despite the luminosity class of III, the visible component of Beta^{2} Capricorni is apparently a main sequence star.
