= HD 175640 =

Star in the constellation Aquila

Observation data Epoch J2000 Equinox ICRS
- Constellation: Aquila
- Right ascension: 18^{h} 56^{m} 22.660^{s}
- Declination: −01° 47′ 59.50″
- Apparent magnitude (V): 6.20

Characteristics
- Evolutionary stage: main sequence
- Spectral type: B9 IIIp(HgMnEu st, CaMg wk); B9 V
- B−V color index: −0.046±0.005
- Variable type: Stable

Astrometry
| Radial velocity (R_{v}) | −26±4 km/s |
| Proper motion (μ) | RA: −2.811 mas/yr Dec.: −19.318 mas/yr |
| Parallax (π) | 6.3201±0.0448 mas |
| Distance | 516 ± 4 ly (158 ± 1 pc) |
| Absolute magnitude (M_{V}) | 0.22 |

Details
| Mass | 3.12±0.1 M_{☉} |
| Radius | 2.66±0.28 R_{☉} |
| Luminosity | 94.56 L_{☉} |
| Surface gravity (log g) | 4.03 cgs |
| Temperature | 12324±9 K |
| Metallicity [Fe/H] | 0.18±0.04 dex |
| Rotational velocity (v sin i) | 1.6±0.3 km/s |

Other designations
- BD−01°3602, FK5 3510, GC 25995, HD 175640, HIP 92963, HR 7143, SAO 142825

Database references
| SIMBAD | data |

HD 175640 is a star in the equatorial constellation of Aquila. It has an apparent visual magnitude of 6.20, which is bright enough to be visible to the naked eye under suitable seeing conditions. The star is located at a distance of approximately 516 light years as determined through parallax measurements. At that distance, the star's color is modified by an extinction of 0.36 magnitude due to interstellar dust. It is drifting closer with a heliocentric radial velocity of roughly −26 km/s.

This is classified as a mercury-manganese star, which is a late B-type chemically peculiar star of type CP3. A distinctive feature of this class of stars is an apparent extreme overabundance of the elements mercury and manganese. It has a low longitudinal magnetic field strength of −0.6±2.2 G. This is a particularly stable star, showing no signs of pulsation. As with other HgMn stars, it is spinning slowly, showing a projected rotational velocity of 1.6 km/s.

In 2007, some evidence was found that this may be a single-lined spectroscopic binary star system. In particular, shifts in radial velocity were observed in the range of 7 to −7 km/s.
