= Alpha1 Capricorni =

Star in the constellation Capricornus

α^{1} Capricorni
- Location of the α Capricorni pair in the red circle.

Observation data Epoch J2000.0 Equinox J2000.0 (ICRS)
- Constellation: Capricornus
- Right ascension: 20^{h} 17^{m} 38.869^{s}
- Declination: −12° 30′ 29.56″
- Apparent magnitude (V): 4.27 + 8.60

Characteristics
- Evolutionary stage: Supergiant
- Spectral type: G3 Ib
- U−B color index: +0.70
- B−V color index: +1.07
- Variable type: Constant

Astrometry
Radial velocity (R_{v})	−25.79±0.15 km/s
Proper motion (μ)	RA: +21.709 mas/yr Dec.: +1.643 mas/yr
Parallax (π)	4.0157±0.1072 mas
Distance	810 ± 20 ly (249 ± 7 pc)
Absolute magnitude (M_{V})	−1.90

Details
Mass	5.3 M_{☉}
Radius	36.3±2.0 R_{☉}
Luminosity	1,047 L_{☉}
Surface gravity (log g)	1.75 cgs
Temperature	5,119±15 K
Metallicity [Fe/H]	−0.02 dex
Rotational velocity (v sin i)	7.3 km/s

Other designations
- Sukhurmashu, Prima Giedi, Algiedi Prima, α^{1} Cap, 5 Capricorni, BD−12°5683, HD 192876, HIP 100027, HR 7747, WDS 20176-1230

Database references
SIMBAD	data

Alpha^{1} Capricorni, also named Sukhurmashu, is a binary star system dominated by a highly luminous star in the constellation of Capricornus, north of the ecliptic. The system is separated from the brighter Alpha^{2} Capricorni by 0.11° of the sky, a gap resolvable with the naked eye, similar to Mizar and Alcor. Both are not to be confused with much fainter 3 Capricorni nor somewhat fainter Nu Capricorni which are 3 to 6 times the angular distance apart than separate the two Alpha stars, respectively.

== Nomenclature ==
The Bayer designation Alpha^{1} Capricorni is Latinized from α^{1} Capricorni, and abbreviated Alpha^{1} Cap or α^{1} Cap. It bore the traditional star names Prima Giedi (/ˌpraɪmə ˈdʒiːdi/) and Algiedi Prima (/æˈdʒiːdi ˈpraɪmə/), and shared the name Algedi with its brighter neighbor Alpha^{2} Capricorni, now the IAU-approved name of that star.

Suḫurmāšu was the ancient Akkadian name of the goat-fish constellation Capricornus. The IAU Working Group on Star Names adopted the name Sukhurmashu for this star on 16 July 2026.

== Properties ==
The primary star is a yellow hued supergiant star with a stellar classification of G3 Ib. It has an apparent magnitude of +4.3; bright enough to make it visible to the naked eye. The star is located at a distance of approximately 810 light-years (250 pc) 870 light years from the Solar System based on parallax measurements, but is drifting closer with a radial velocity of −26 km/s. The star is past first dredge-up and has already evolved through the Cepheid instability strip; it may be about to do so a second time. It has 5.3 times the mass and 36 times the radius of the Sun, and is radiating around 1,047 times the Sun's luminosity from its photosphere at an effective temperature of 5,119 K.

The Hipparcos satellite in about the year 2000 found a previously undetected companion at an angular separation of 0.65″ from the primary. This magnitude 8.60 star forms a binary pair with α^{1} Capricorni. Three other faint visual companion stars lie within one arc-minute, so are unresolveable in small telescopes. The brightest of these is 10th magnitude and on this basis it has often been considered as an optical binary. Separation is increasing rapidly due to great proper motion of the primary star.
