= Historical brightest stars =

The Solar System and all of the visible stars are in different orbits about the core of the Milky Way galaxy. Thus, their relative positions change over time, and for the nearer stars this movement can be measured. As a star moves toward or away from us, its apparent brightness changes. Sirius is currently the brightest star in Earth's night sky, but it has not always been so. Canopus has persistently been the brightest star over the ages; other stars appear brighter only during relatively temporary periods, during which they are passing the Solar System at a much closer distance than Canopus.

Working out exactly which stars were or will be the brightest at any given point in the past or future is difficult since it requires precise 3D proper motions of large numbers of stars and precise distances, as well as stellar evolution (for massive stars). This information only started to become available with the 1997 Hipparcos satellite data release. Jocelyn Tomkin used this data to compile a list of brightest stars in Earth's night sky at each period within the last or next 5 million years. Re-analysis of the Hipparcos data and new data from the Gaia spacecraft reveal omissions and revisions necessary in the list. For example, it omits Gliese 710 which in about 1.35 million years is expected to be close enough to have a magnitude of −2.7, as confirmed by the Gaia spacecraft.

== Table ==
Star	Start year	End year	Maximum year	Maximum magnitude	Distance at maximum magnitude (ly)	Current distance	Current magnitude
Epsilon Canis Majoris (Adhara) (Note: This star is now a luminous giant. It may have been on the main sequence, approx. 1 mag fainter, during the time span given.)	...	−4,460,000	−4,700,000	−3.99 (Note: This star may have had a magnitude of -4.13, around 4,400,000 million years ago instead.The apparent magnitude was calculated via the equation mv = Mv−5+5 • log(d), where mv is the apparent magnitude, Mv is the absolute magnitude and d is the distance in parsecs. Values for Mv and d of −3.97 and 9.3 pc were used.)	34	430	1.50
Beta Canis Majoris (Mirzam) (Note: This star is now a giant. It may have been on the main sequence, approx. 1 mag fainter, during the time span given.)	−4,460,000	−3,700,000	−4,420,000	−3.65	37	500	1.99
Canopus (first time)	−3,700,000	−1,370,000	−3,110,000	−1.86	177	310	−0.72
??? (Note: It is unknown which star(s) held the title of brightest star during this period. This is due to Zeta Sagittarii, the titleholder on Tomkin's list, being revealed to have been further away, and thus dimmer than expected. It is likely that both Canopus and Zeta Leporis held the title during this period, but the exact start and end dates cannot be determined.)	−1,370,000	−1,080,000	...	...	...	...	...
Zeta Leporis (Darlugal)	−1,080,000	−950,000	−1,050,000	−2.05	5.3	70	3.55
Canopus (second time)	−950,000	−420,000	−950,000	−1.09 (Note: Peak magnitude is not the brightest for this star)	252	310	−0.72
Aldebaran	−420,000	−210,000	−320,000	−1.54	21.5	65	0.85
Capella	−210,000	−160,000	−240,000	−0.82 (Note: This peak occurs when another star is brightest)	27.9	42.2	0.08
Canopus (third time)	−160,000	−90,000	−160,000	−0.70	302	310	−0.72
Sirius (current)	−90,000	+210,000	+60,000	−1.68	7.8	8.6	−1.46
Vega	+210,000	+480,000	+290,000	−0.81	17.2	25.04	0.03
Canopus (fourth time)	+480,000	+990,000	+480,000	−0.40	346	310	−0.72
Beta Aurigae (Menkalinan)	+990,000	+1,150,000	+1,190,000	−0.40	28.5	82.1	1.9
Delta Scuti	+1,150,000	+1,260,000	+1,250,000	−1.84	9.2	187	4.72
Gliese 710	+1,260,000 (Note: It is known that Gliese 710 will become the titleholder, however the exact start and end years may be approximate due to the sources not providing exact dates.)	+1,460,000	+1,300,000	−2.7	0.16	62	9.66
Gamma Draconis (Eltanin)	+1,460,000	+2,030,000	+1,550,000	−1.39	27.7	154	2.36
Upsilon Librae	+2,030,000	+2,670,000	+2,290,000	−0.46	30	195	3.6
NR Canis Majoris	+2,670,000	+3,050,000	+2,870,000	−0.88	14	280	5.6
Omicron Herculis	+3,050,000	+3,870,000	+3,470,000	−0.63	44	346	3.83
Albireo	+3,870,000	...	+4,610,000	−0.52	80	390	3.18

== Table of candidate titleholders of the brightest star ==
The scientific accuracy of the proper motions of these stars may not be fully confirmed.

Star	Start year	End year	Maximum year	Maximum magnitude	Distance at maximum magnitude (ly)	Current distance	Current magnitude
Algol	...	...	−7,300,000	−2.5	9.8	94	2.12
HD 49995	...	...	−4,034,000	−3.28	1.70	439	8.78
HD 102928 (Note: Non-single star with RUWE = 3.93.)	...	...	−3,940,000	−5.51	1.31	219	5.62
Gamma Microscopii	...	...	−3,800,000	−3.00	6	223	4.68
HD 179939	...	...	−3,020,000	−3.27	2.65	334	7.23
HD 7977 (Note: Possible binary with RUWE score 2.01)	...	...	−2,470,000??	−4.48 to −11.93??	0.0158-0.49??	246.9	9.04
Rho Puppis (Tureis) (Note: Highly unlikely to have been bright enough to be the brightest star, but theoretically possible as the brightness of Aldebaran at the moment is not stated.)	...	...	−394,000	−1.01	11.6	63.5	2.68
Delta Geminorum (Wasat)	…	…	1,100,000	−1.25	6.7	60.45	3.53
Gamma Scuti	…	…	2,350,000	−1.34	20	319	4.67
UCAC4 689-035468	...	...	8,316,000	−2.24 (Note: The apparent magnitude was calculated via the equation mv = Mv−5+5 • log(d), where mv is the apparent magnitude, Mv is the absolute magnitude and d is the distance in parsecs. Values for Mv and d of 5.791 and 197.16 pc were used.)	0.81	643?	12.265
