= Zeta Leporis =

Star in the constellation Lepus

ζ Leporis
- Location of ζ Leporis (circled)

Observation data Epoch J2000.0 Equinox J2000.0
- Constellation: Lepus
- Right ascension: 05^{h} 46^{m} 57.34096^{s}
- Declination: −14° 49′ 19.0199″
- Apparent magnitude (V): 3.524

Characteristics
- Spectral type: A2 IV-V(n)
- U−B color index: +0.113
- B−V color index: +0.114

Astrometry
| Radial velocity (R_{v}) | 20.0–24.7 km/s |
| Proper motion (μ) | RA: −14.54 mas/yr Dec.: −1.07 mas/yr |
| Parallax (π) | 46.28±0.16 mas |
| Distance | 70.5 ± 0.2 ly (21.61 ± 0.07 pc) |
| Absolute magnitude (M_{V}) | +1.88 |

Details
| Mass | 1.46 M_{☉} |
| Radius | 1.5 R_{☉} |
| Luminosity | 14 L_{☉} |
| Surface gravity (log g) | 4.41 cgs |
| Temperature | 9,772 K |
| Metallicity [Fe/H] | −0.76 dex |
| Rotational velocity (v sin i) | 245 km/s |
| Age | 231+126 −181 Myr |

Other designations
- Darlugal, ζ Lep, 14 Lep, BD−14°1232, FK5 219, GJ 217.1, GJ 9190, HD 38678, HIP 27288, HR 1998, SAO 150801, PLX 1326

Database references
| SIMBAD | data |
| ARICNS | data |

Zeta Leporis, Latinized from ζ Leporis formally named Darlugal, is a star approximately 70.5 light-years (21.6 parsecs) away in the southern constellation of Lepus. It has an apparent visual magnitude of 3.5, which is bright enough to be seen with the naked eye. In 2001, an asteroid belt was confirmed to orbit the star.

== Nomenclature ==
Zeta Leporis, Latinized from ζ Leporis, is the star's Bayer designation.

DAR.LUGAL, the Rooster, was the ancient Sumerian name for the constellation now known as Lepus (the Hare). The IAU Working Group on Star Names approved the name Darlugal for ζ Leporis on 22 March 2026.

== Stellar properties ==
Zeta Leporis has a stellar classification of A2 IV-V(n), suggesting that it is in a transitional stage between an A-type main-sequence star and a subgiant. The (n) suffix indicates that the absorption lines in the star's spectrum appear nebulous because it is spinning rapidly, causing the lines to broaden because of the Doppler effect. The projected rotational velocity is 245 km/s, giving a lower limit on the star's actual equatorial azimuthal velocity.

The star has about 1.46 times the mass of the Sun, along with 1.5 times the radius, and 14 times the luminosity. The abundance of elements other than hydrogen and helium, what astronomers term the star's metallicity, is only 17% of the abundance in the Sun. The star appears to be young, probably around 231 million years in age, but the margin of error spans 50–347 million years old.

== Asteroid belt ==
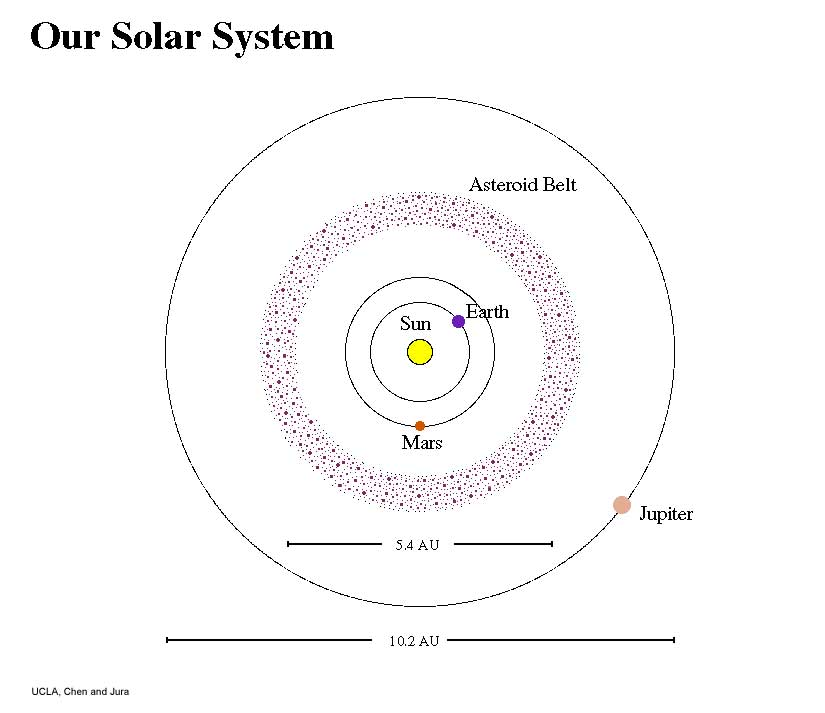

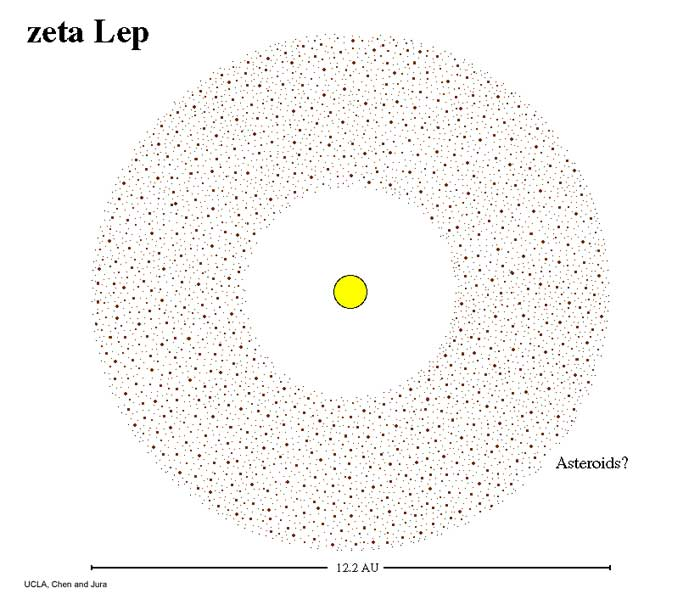
A size comparison of the asteroid belt of the Solar System (top) and the Zeta Leporis asteroid belt (bottom).

In 1983, based on radiation in the infrared portion of the electromagnetic spectrum, the InfraRed Astronomical Satellite was used to identify dust orbiting this star. This debris disk is constrained to a diameter of 12.2 AU.

By 2001, the Long Wavelength Spectrometer at the Keck Observatory on Mauna Kea, Hawaii, was used more accurately to constrain the radius of the dust. It was found to lie within a 5.4 AU radius. The temperature of the dust was estimated as about 340 K. Based on heating from the star, this could place the grains as close as 2.5 AU from Zeta Leporis.

It is now believed that the dust is coming from a massive asteroid belt in orbit around Zeta Leporis, making it the first extra-solar asteroid belt to be discovered. The estimated mass of the belt is about 200 times the total mass in the Solar System's asteroid belt, or 4×10^{23} kg. For comparison, this is more than half the total mass of the Moon. Astronomers Christine Chen and professor Michael Jura found that the dust contained within this belt should have fallen into the star within 20,000 years, a time period much shorter than Zeta Leporis's estimated age, suggesting that some mechanism must be replenishing the belt. The belt's age is estimated to be 3×10^{8} years.

The Zeta Leporis planetary system
| Companion (in order from star) | Mass | Semimajor axis (AU) | Orbital period (days) | Eccentricity | Inclination | Radius |
|---|---|---|---|---|---|---|
| Asteroid belt | 2.5–6.1 AU | | | | — | — |

== Solar encounter ==
Bobylev's calculations from 2010 suggest that this star passed as close as 1.28 parsecs (4.17 light-years) from the Sun about 861,000 years ago. García-Sánchez 2001 suggested that the star passed 1.64 parsecs (5.34 light-years) from the Sun about 1 million years ago. It was the brightest star in the night sky over 1 million years ago, peaking with an apparent magnitude of -2.05.

== See also ==
- Delta Trianguli
- HD 69830
- Vega
