= Kappa Cancri =

Star in the constellation Cancer

- Location of κ Cancri (circled)

Observation data Epoch J2000.0 Equinox J2000.0 (ICRS)
- Constellation: Cancer
- Right ascension: 09^{h} 07^{m} 44.80955^{s}
- Declination: +10° 40′ 05.5196″
- Apparent magnitude (V): +5.233

Characteristics
- Evolutionary stage: Main sequence
- Spectral type: B8 IIIp
- B−V color index: −0.113
- Variable type: α^{2} CVn

Astrometry
Radial velocity (R_{v})	24.5±0.8 km/s
Proper motion (μ)	RA: −18.31 mas/yr Dec.: −12.105 mas/yr
Parallax (π)	5.3209±0.1298 mas
Distance	610 ± 10 ly (188 ± 5 pc)
Absolute magnitude (M_{V})	−0.82

Orbit
Period (P)	6.3933 d
Eccentricity (e)	0.13
Periastron epoch (T)	2440001.95 JD
Argument of periastron (ω) (secondary)	157°
Semi-amplitude (K_{1}) (primary)	67.4 km/s

Details

κ Cnc A
Mass	4.5 M_{☉}
Radius	5.0 R_{☉}
Luminosity	322 L_{☉}
Surface gravity (log g)	3.7±0.1 cgs
Temperature	12,800±200 K
Metallicity [Fe/H]	+0.51 dex
Rotational velocity (v sin i)	6±2 km/s

κ Cnc B
Mass	2.1 M_{☉}
Radius	2.4 R_{☉}
Surface gravity (log g)	4.0 cgs
Temperature	8,500 K
Rotational velocity (v sin i)	40 km/s

Other designations
- κ Cnc, 76 Cancri, BD+11°1984, FK5 1238, GC 12596, HD 78316, HIP 44798, HR 3623, SAO 98378, WDS J09077+1040AB

Database references
SIMBAD	data

Kappa Cancri is a blue-white hued binary star system in the zodiac constellation of Cancer. Its name is a Bayer designation that is Latinized from κ Cancri, and abbreviated Kappa Cnc or κ Cnc. This system is faintly visible to the naked eye as a star with an apparent visual magnitude of +5.23. The magnitude difference between the two stars is about 2.6. Based upon an annual parallax shift of 5.32 mas as seen from the Earth, the system is located approximately 610 light-years distant from the Sun. It is drifting further away with a line of sight velocity of 25 km/s. The position of this system near the ecliptic means it is subject to lunar occultation.

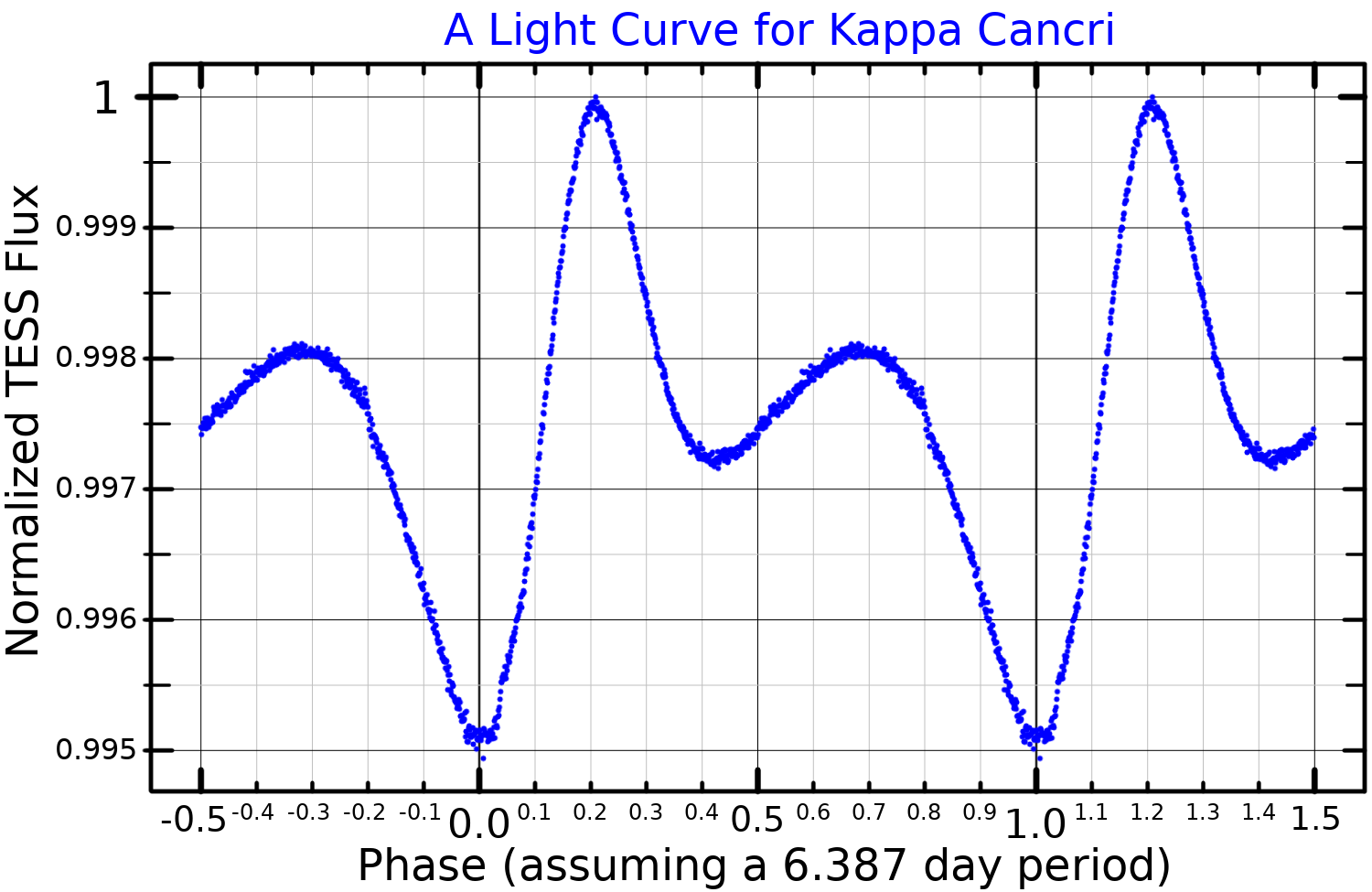
A light curve for Kappa Cancri, plotted from TESS data

This is a single-lined spectroscopic binary star system with an orbital period of 6.39 days and an eccentricity of 0.13. The primary, component A, has a stellar classification of B8 IIIp, suggesting it is a B-type giant star. This a mercury-manganese star, a type of chemically peculiar star showing large overabundances of those two elements in the outer atmosphere. This indicates that it is instead a main sequence star. It is classified as an Alpha2 Canum Venaticorum type variable star and its brightness varies from magnitude +5.22 to +5.27 with a period of five days.

The primary component has 4.5 times the mass of the Sun, five times the Sun's radius, and an effective temperature of 13,200 K. The secondary, component B, is a smaller star with 2.1 times the mass and 2.4 times the radius of the Sun, having an effective temperature of 8,500 K.
