= Nu Capricorni =

Star in the constellation Capricornus

- Location of ν Capricorni (circled), to the ESE of the naked eye double, α Capricorni

Observation data Epoch J2000.0 Equinox J2000.0 (ICRS)
- Constellation: Capricornus
- Right ascension: 20^{h} 20^{m} 39.816^{s}
- Declination: −12° 45′ 32.69″
- Apparent magnitude (V): +4.76

Characteristics
- Evolutionary stage: main sequence
- Spectral type: B9 IV or B9.5 V
- U−B color index: −0.11
- B−V color index: −0.04

Astrometry
Radial velocity (R_{v})	−1.00 km/s
Proper motion (μ)	RA: +14.130 mas/yr Dec.: −15.123 mas/yr
Parallax (π)	12.1737±0.1597 mas
Distance	268 ± 4 ly (82 ± 1 pc)
Absolute magnitude (M_{V})	+0.32

Details
Mass	2.37 M_{☉}
Radius	3.04±0.08 R_{☉}
Luminosity	89±4 L_{☉}
Surface gravity (log g)	3.88±0.08 cgs
Temperature	10,200±220 K
Metallicity [Fe/H]	−0.15±0.04 dex
Rotational velocity (v sin i)	24 km/s
Age	115 Myr

Other designations
- Alshat, ν Cap, Nu Cap, 8 Cap, BD−13°5642, HD 193432, HIP 100310, HR 7773, SAO 163468, ADS 13714, WDS J20207-1246A

Database references
SIMBAD	data

Nu Capricorni is a star in the southern constellation of Capricornus. It has the proper name Alshat, pronounced /ˈælʃæt/; Nu Capricorni is the Bayer designation. This star is visible to the naked eye with an apparent visual magnitude of +4.76. It is calculated to be a distance of 268 light-years (82 pc) distant from the Sun based on parallax.

Nu Capricorni is 6.6 degrees north of the ecliptic and so is within the margin of occultations of few if any planets but is well within that of the Moon. The celestial latitude of either of the Alpha Capricorni main stars is about 6.93 degrees by comparison.

== Characteristics ==
The star is a blue-white hued B-type main-sequence star. With an estimated age of 115 million years, it is spinning with a projected rotational velocity of 24 km/s. It has 2.4 times the mass of the Sun and 3 times the Sun's radius. The star is radiating 89 times the luminosity of the Sun from its photosphere at an effective temperature of 10,200 K. It has a nearly Sun-like composition of elements.

It has an optical companion, named Nu Capricorni B, a magnitude 11.8 star at an angular separation of 54.1 arcseconds from the primary. Gaia Data Release 2 shows the companion to be much further away from Earth, forming a binary system only in the line-of-sight.

== Nomenclature ==
ν Capricorni, Latinised to Nu Capricorni, is the system's Bayer designation, abbreviated Nu Cap or ν Cap.

The star bore the traditional name Alshat, from the Arabic الشاة aš-šā[t], meaning 'the sheep' that was to be slaughtered by the adjacent Beta¹ Capricorni (Dabih). In 2016, the IAU organized a Working Group on Star Names (WGSN) to catalog and standardize proper names for stars. It approved the name Alshat on 30 June 2017 and it is now so included in the List of IAU-approved Star Names.
