= 29 Herculis =

K-type giant star in the constellation Hercules

- Location of 29 Herculis (circled in red)

Observation data Epoch J2000 Equinox J2000
- Constellation: Hercules
- Right ascension: 16^{h} 32^{m} 36.29190^{s}
- Declination: +11° 29′ 16.9479″
- Apparent magnitude (V): 4.84

Characteristics
- Evolutionary stage: giant
- Spectral type: K4.5 III
- B−V color index: 1.495±0.002
- Variable type: suspected

Astrometry
Radial velocity (R_{v})	+2.92±0.20 km/s
Proper motion (μ)	RA: -178.84 mas/yr Dec.: −79.27 mas/yr
Parallax (π)	9.29±0.26 mas
Distance	351 ± 10 ly (108 ± 3 pc)
Absolute magnitude (M_{V})	−0.17

Details
Mass	1.19 M_{☉}
Radius	42.05+0.45 −1.81 R_{☉}
Luminosity	384±19 L_{☉}
Surface gravity (log g)	1.79±0.28 cgs
Temperature	3,958±25 K
Metallicity [Fe/H]	−0.18±0.09 dex
Rotational velocity (v sin i)	5.4 km/s
Age	6.53 Gyr

Other designations
- h Her, 29 Her, NSV 7812, BD+11°3008, FK5 3310, GC 22250, HD 149161, HIP 81008, HR 6159, SAO 102234, LTT 14915

Database references
SIMBAD	data

29 Herculis is a single star located around 351 light-years away from the Sun in the northern constellation of Hercules, a few degrees away from Omega Herculis. It has the Bayer designation h Herculis, while 29 Herculis is the Flamsteed designation. This star is visible to the naked eye as a faint, orange-hued point of light with an apparent visual magnitude of 4.84. It is moving further from the Earth with a heliocentric radial velocity of +3 km/s. The star has a relatively high proper motion, traversing the celestial sphere at the rate of 0.195 arcseconds per annum.

This is an aging giant star with a stellar classification of K4.5 III. It displays an enhanced abundance of elements generated through the alpha process, and, in particular, has a strong enhancement of silicon. 29 Herculis is a suspected variable star of unknown type, and has been measured ranging in visual magnitude from 4.82 down to 4.85. It is an estimated 6.53 billion years old with 1.19 times the mass of the Sun. Having exhausted the supply of hydrogen at its core, it has expanded to 42 times the Sun's radius. The star is radiating 384 times the luminosity of the Sun from its swollen photosphere at an effective temperature of 3,958 K.
