= HD 30963 =

Star in the constellation Eridanus

Observation data Epoch J2000 Equinox ICRS
- Constellation: Eridanus
- Right ascension: 04^{h} 51^{m} 39.2471^{s}
- Declination: −10° 17′ 25.212″
- Apparent magnitude (V): 7.23

Characteristics
- Evolutionary stage: main sequence
- Spectral type: B9 HgMn

Astrometry
Radial velocity (R_{v})	−7.2 km/s
Proper motion (μ)	RA: −7.435 mas/yr Dec.: −3.538 mas/yr
Parallax (π)	3.1899±0.0204 mas
Distance	1,022 ± 7 ly (313 ± 2 pc)
Absolute magnitude (M_{V})	+0.43

Details
Mass	3.3 M_{☉}
Radius	3.3 R_{☉}
Luminosity	182 L_{☉}
Surface gravity (log g)	3.664±0.031 cgs
Temperature	11,476±150 K
Metallicity [Fe/H]	−0.19 dex
Rotational velocity (v sin i)	24±12 km/s
Age	207 Myr

Other designations
- BD−10°1028, HD 30963, HIP 22588, SAO 149937

Database references
SIMBAD	data

HD 30963 is a star in the constellation of Eridanus. With an apparent magnitude of 7.23, it cannot be seen with the naked eye. Parallax measurements put the star at a distance of around 1,022 light-years (313 parsecs).

HD 30963 is a late B-type star. It is a mercury-manganese star, a class of chemically peculiar star that has an overabundance of certain elements like mercury. HD 30963 has 150,000 times as much mercury, 2,500 times as much platinum, 1,000 times as much yttrium, and 150 times as much zirconium compared to the Sun. It has a mass of 3.3 M_{☉}, and its surface temperature is about 11,500 K.

HD 30963 is close to the orbit that the Solar System is traversing in the Milky Way. The Sun will be close to the current location of HD 30963 in about 18.5 million years. Interstellar absorption lines for Na I are present for velocities lower than 10 km/s.

== Extra reading ==
- David-Uraz, A.; Shultz, M. E.; Petit, V.; Bowman, D. M.; Erba, C.; Fine, R. A.; Neiner, C.; Pablo, H.; Sikora, J.; Ud-Doula, A.; Wade, G. A. (2021). "MOBSTER - IV. Detection of a new magnetic B-type star from follow-up spectropolarimetric observations of photometrically selected candidates★". Monthly Notices of the Royal Astronomical Society. 504 (4): 4841. arXiv:2004.09698. Bibcode:2021MNRAS.504.4841D. doi:10.1093/mnras/stab899.
- Monier, R.; Griffin, E.; Gebran, M.; Kılıçoğlu, T.; Merle, T.; Royer, F. (26 September 2019). "The Chemical Compositions of the Two New HgMn Stars HD 30085 and HD 30963: Comparison to χ Lupi A, ν Cap, and HD 174567". The Astronomical Journal. 158 (4): 157. arXiv:1908.05023. Bibcode:2019AJ....158..157M. doi:10.3847/1538-3881/ab3b59. S2CID 199577707.
