= 53 Aurigae =

Binary star system in the constellation Auriga

Observation data Epoch J2000 Equinox ICRS
- Constellation: Auriga
- Right ascension: 06^{h} 38^{m} 23.01009^{s}
- Declination: +28° 59′ 03.6220″
- Apparent magnitude (V): 5.744

Characteristics
- Spectral type: B9 Mn + F0m
- U−B color index: −0.07
- B−V color index: −0.02

Astrometry
Radial velocity (R_{v})	13.1±5.0 km/s
Proper motion (μ)	RA: −16.390 mas/yr Dec.: −14.305 mas/yr
Parallax (π)	8.5139±0.1372 mas
Distance	383 ± 6 ly (117 ± 2 pc)
Absolute magnitude (M_{V})	+0.48

Orbit
Period (P)	38.90 yr
Semi-major axis (a)	0.159″
Eccentricity (e)	0.557
Inclination (i)	119.5°
Longitude of the node (Ω)	113.5°
Periastron epoch (T)	B 1976.73
Argument of periastron (ω) (secondary)	343.3°

Details

53 Aur A
Mass	2.49±0.13 M_{☉}
Surface gravity (log g)	4.0 cgs
Temperature	10750 K
Rotational velocity (v sin i)	25 km/s

53 Aur B
Surface gravity (log g)	4.0 cgs
Temperature	7,250 K
Rotational velocity (v sin i)	0 km/s

Other designations
- BD+29°1293, GC 8649, HD 47152, HIP 31737, HR 2425, SAO 78571, PPM 96293, CCDM J06384+2859, WDS J06384+2859, TYC 1892-236-1, GSC 01892-00236

Database references
SIMBAD	data

53 Aurigae is a binary star system in the northern constellation of Auriga. It is visible to the naked eye as a dim star with a combined apparent visual magnitude of 5.74. Parallax estimates put it at a distance of 383 light-years (117 parsecs) away. The system is receding from the Earth with a heliocentric radial velocity of 13 km/s.

The two components of 53 Aurigae orbit each other every 39 years with an eccentricity of 0.557. The primary component, 53 Aurigae A, is chemically peculiar since it contains higher-than-normal amounts of manganese, but also europium, chromium, and mercury. It is a B-type main-sequence mercury-manganese star, while the secondary component, 53 Aurigae B, is an early F-type main-sequence star. The total mass of the system is estimated to be 4.8 M_{☉}.
