= Xi1 Capricorni =

Star in the constellation Capricornus

Xi^{1} Capricorni
- Location of ξ^{1} Capricorni (circled)

Observation data Epoch J2000.0 Equinox J2000.0 (ICRS)
- Constellation: Capricornus
- Right ascension: 20^{h} 11^{m} 57.898^{s}
- Declination: −12° 23′ 32.65″
- Apparent magnitude (V): +6.34

Characteristics
- Spectral type: K0 III
- B−V color index: +1.21
- Variable type: Constant

Astrometry
Radial velocity (R_{v})	+0.9 km/s
Proper motion (μ)	RA: −8.251 mas/yr Dec.: −18.278 mas/yr
Parallax (π)	5.3163±0.0275 mas
Distance	614 ± 3 ly (188.1 ± 1.0 pc)
Absolute magnitude (M_{V})	+0.56

Details
Mass	1.55 M_{☉}
Radius	18.88+0.72 −0.95 R_{☉}
Luminosity	139±2 L_{☉}
Surface gravity (log g)	1.48±0.10 cgs
Temperature	4,439±42 K
Metallicity [Fe/H]	−0.18±0.11 dex
Age	3.35 Gyr

Other designations
- ξ^{1} Cap, 1 Cap, BD−12°5664, GC 28026, HD 191753, HIP 99529, HR 7712, SAO 163328

Database references
SIMBAD	data

Xi^{1} Capricorni, Latinized from ξ^{1} Capricorni, is an orange-hued star in the constellation Capricornus. Its name is a Bayer designation that is Latinized from ξ^{1} Capricorni, and abbreviated Xi^{1} Cap or ξ^{1} Cap. With an apparent visual magnitude of +6.34, it is near the lower limit of brightness for stars that can be seen with the naked eye. Based upon an annual parallax shift of 5.32 mas as seen from Earth, this system is located approximately 614 light-years (188 pc) 620 light-years distant from the Sun.

It is an evolved K-type giant star with a stellar classification of K0 III. With an age of 3.35 billion years, this star has an estimated 1.55 times the mass of the Sun and is radiating 139 times the Sun's luminosity from its enlarged photosphere at an effective temperature of about 4,439 K.
