= NR Canis Majoris =

Binary star system in the constellation Canis Major

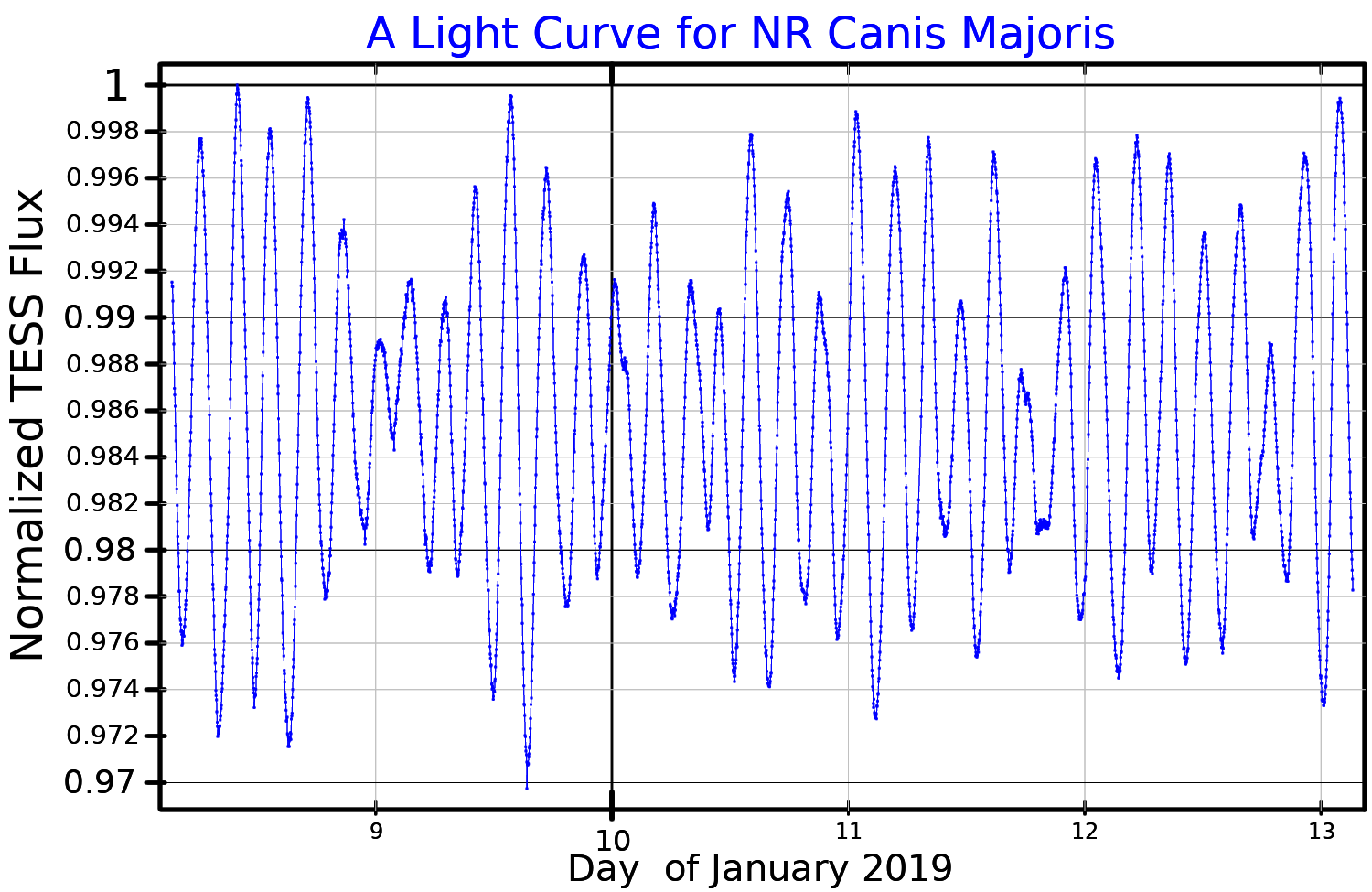
- A light curve for NR Canis Majoris, plotted from TESS data

Observation data Epoch J2000 Equinox ICRS
- Constellation: Canis Major
- Right ascension: 07^{h} 27^{m} 07.99012^{s}
- Declination: −17° 51′ 53.5058″
- Apparent magnitude (V): 5.60 (5.66 + 9.23)

Characteristics
- Spectral type: F2V
- B−V color index: +0.314±0.002
- Variable type: δ Sct

Astrometry
Radial velocity (R_{v})	−29.2±2.9 km/s
Proper motion (μ)	RA: −2.420 mas/yr Dec.: +1.388 mas/yr
Parallax (π)	10.9688±0.0917 mas
Distance	297 ± 2 ly (91.2 ± 0.8 pc)
Absolute magnitude (M_{V})	0.78

Details

A
Mass	1.62 or 2.18±0.04 M_{☉}
Radius	3.90+0.18 −0.24 R_{☉}
Luminosity	37.4±0.4 L_{☉}
Surface gravity (log g)	3.65 cgs
Temperature	7,227+238 −160 K
Rotational velocity (v sin i)	185 km/s
Age	1.494 Gyr

Other designations
- NR CMa, BD−17°1980, HD 58954, HIP 36186, HR 2853, SAO 152894, ADS 6093, CCDM J07271-1752AB, WDS J07271-1752

Database references
SIMBAD	data

NR Canis Majoris is a binary star system in the southern constellation of Canis Major, located to the east of Sirius and Gamma Canis Majoris near the constellation border with Puppis. It has a yellow-white hue and is dimly visible to the naked eye with a combined apparent visual magnitude that fluctuates around 5.60. It is located at a distance of approximately 297 light years from the Sun based on parallax. The system is drifting closer to the Sun with a radial velocity of −29 km/s, and in about three million years it is predicted to approach within 14.1+4.7
−4.0 ly. At that time, the star will become the brightest in the night sky, potentially reaching magnitude −0.88.

The magnitude 5.66 primary component is an F-type main-sequence star with a stellar classification of F2V. The star was discovered to be a variable star when the Hipparcos data was analyzed. It was given its variable star designation, NR Canis Majoris, in 1999. It is a Delta Scuti variable that varies by a few hundredths of a magnitude over roughly 16 hours. The star is an estimated 1.5 billion years old. It has a high rate of spin with a projected rotational velocity of 185 km/s, which is giving the star an equatorial bulge that is estimated to be 8% larger than the polar radius.

The secondary companion is magnitude 9.23 and lies at an angular separation of 1.3″ along a position angle of 39°, as of 2005.
