= HD 95086 =

Star in the constellation Carina

HD 95086 / Aiolos
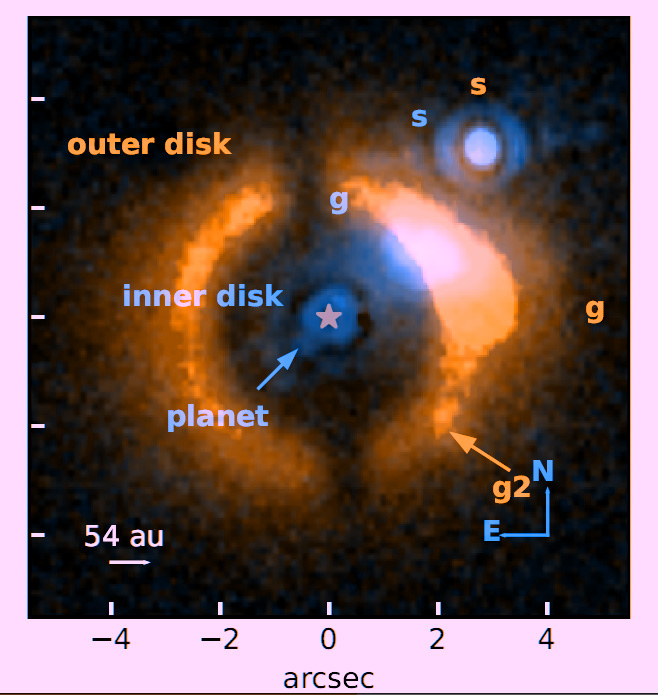
- HD 95086 system. g and g2 are background galaxies, s is a background star Credit: NASA/ESA/CSA JWST, modified work by Mâlin et al. 2024

Observation data Epoch J2000 Equinox ICRS
- Constellation: Carina
- Right ascension: 10^{h} 57^{m} 03.02157^{s}
- Declination: −68° 40′ 02.4492″
- Apparent magnitude (V): 7.36

Characteristics
- Evolutionary stage: Pre-main-sequence star
- Spectral type: A8

Astrometry
Radial velocity (R_{v})	18.04±0.16 km/s
Proper motion (μ)	RA: −41.128 mas/yr Dec.: 12.861 mas/yr
Parallax (π)	11.5659±0.0187 mas
Distance	282.0 ± 0.5 ly (86.5 ± 0.1 pc)
Absolute magnitude (M_{V})	+2.58

Details
Mass	1.6±0.1 M_{☉}
Luminosity	5.7±1.7 L_{☉}
Surface gravity (log g)	4.0±0.5 cgs
Temperature	7750±250 K
Metallicity [Fe/H]	−0.25±0.5 dex
Rotational velocity (v sin i)	20 ± 10 km/s
Age	13.3^{+1.1}_{−0.6} Myr

Other designations
- Aiolos, CD−68 847, HD 95086, HIP 53524, TYC 9212-4675-1, GSC 09212-04675, 2MASS J10570301-6840023

Database references
SIMBAD	data

HD 95086, formally named Aiolos, is a pre-main-sequence star about 282 light-years (86 parsecs) away. Its surface temperature is 7,750±250 K. HD 95086 is somewhat metal-deficient in comparison to the Sun, with a metallicity Fe/H index of −0.25±0.5 (~55%), and is much younger at an age of 13.3 million years. It was originally thought to be part of the Lower Centaurus-Crux association, until it was found using Gaia data that the star may be instead part of the Carina association.

Multiplicity surveys did not detect any stellar companions to HD 95086 as of 2013.

== Nomenclature ==
The designation HD 95086 comes from the Henry Draper Catalogue.

In August 2022, this planetary system was included among 20 systems to be named by the third NameExoWorlds project. The approved names, proposed by a team from Greece, were announced in June 2023. HD 95086 is named Aiolos after a Greek mythological figure, and its planet is named Levantes, from a modern Greek word referring to easterly Mediterranean winds.

== Planetary system ==
In 2013, one planet, named HD 95086 b, was discovered on a wide orbit by direct imaging. The discovery was confirmed in 2014.

Besides the planet, the star is surrounded by a complex, relatively massive (0.5±0.2 M_{🜨}) debris disk, which may consist of up to four belts (Hot, Warm, Cold and Halo) separated by gaps. A small amount (1.4–13)×10^{−6} M_{🜨} of gaseous carbon monoxide was detected in the outer disk, implying a recent collisional cascade followed by cometary activity of fresh debris.

The HD 95086 planetary system
Companion (in order from star)	Mass	Semimajor axis (AU)	Orbital period (years)	Eccentricity	Inclination (°)	Radius
Warm debris disk	7–10 AU				—	—
b / Levantes	4.5±0.5 M_{J}	51.45±4.66	70.98±55.01	0.16±0.09	106±49	—
Cold debris disk	106–320 AU				90±3°	—
