= Omega Herculis =

Variable star in the constellation Hercules

ω Herculis
- Location of ω Herculis (circled in red)

Observation data Epoch J2000.0 Equinox J2000.0 (ICRS)
- Constellation: Hercules
- Right ascension: 16^{h} 25^{m} 24.95425^{s}
- Declination: +14° 01′ 59.7711″
- Apparent magnitude (V): 4.5821 (4.58 + 11.5)

Characteristics
- Spectral type: A2 Vp CrSr
- U−B color index: +0.01
- B−V color index: +0.00
- Variable type: α^{2} CVn

Astrometry
Radial velocity (R_{v})	−5.90±0.74 km/s
Proper motion (μ)	RA: +40.86 mas/yr Dec.: −59.71 mas/yr
Parallax (π)	13.04±0.64 mas
Distance	250 ± 10 ly (77 ± 4 pc)
Absolute magnitude (M_{V})	0.29±0.15

Details

ω Her A
Mass	2.14 M_{☉}
Radius	3.30 R_{☉}
Luminosity	70 L_{☉}
Surface gravity (log g)	3.51±0.35 cgs
Temperature	10,052±320 K
Metallicity [Fe/H]	+0.47±0.15 dex
Rotation	2.951 d
Rotational velocity (v sin i)	55 km/s
Age	149 Myr

Other designations
- Cujam, ω Her, 24 Her, 51 Ser, BD+14°3049, FK5 613, HD 148112, HIP 80463, HR 6117, SAO 102153, WDS J16254+1402AB

Database references
SIMBAD	data

Omega Herculis (ω Herculis, abbreviated Omega Her, ω Her) is a binary star system in the northern constellation of Hercules. Based upon an annual parallax shift of 13.04 mas as seen from Earth, it is located around 250 light-years from the Sun. It is faintly visible to the naked eye, having a combined apparent visual magnitude of 4.58. The system is a candidate for membership in the Ursa Major Moving Group, although this remains uncertain.

The two components are designated Omega Herculis A (officially named Cujam /ˈkjuːdʒəm/, the traditional name of the system) and B.

== Nomenclature ==
ω Herculis (Latinised to Omega Herculis) is the system's Bayer designation. It previously bore the Flamsteed designation of 51 Serpentis before being added to Hercules. The designations of the two components as Omega Herculis A and B derive from the convention used by the Washington Multiplicity Catalog (WMC) for multiple star systems, and adopted by the International Astronomical Union (IAU).

The system bore the traditional name Cujam (also written as Cajam and Kajam), meaning ("club"). In 2016, the International Astronomical Union organized a Working Group on Star Names (WGSN) to catalogue and standardize proper names for stars. The WGSN decided to attribute proper names to individual stars rather than entire multiple systems. It approved the name Cujam for the component Omega Herculis A on February 1, 2017 and it is now so included in the List of IAU-approved Star Names.

In Chinese, 斗 (Dǒu), meaning Dipper for Liquid, refers to an asterism consisting of Omega Herculis, 49 Serpentis, 13 Herculis, 29 Herculis and 33 Herculis. Consequently, the Chinese name for Omega Herculis itself is 斗一 (Dǒu yī, English: the First Star of Dipper for Liquid).

== Properties ==
The primary, Omega Herculis A, is a chemically peculiar Ap star with a stellar classification of A2 Vp CrSr. The spectrum displays abnormally strong absorption lines of chromium and strontium, and weak lines of calcium and magnesium. An A-type star, it has an estimated 2.14 times the mass of the Sun and 3.30 times the Sun's radius. The star is around 149 million years old and is radiating 70 times the solar luminosity from its photosphere at an effective temperature of 10,052 K.

This component is an Alpha^{2} Canum Venaticorum variable with a brightness amplitude of 0.4 magnitude and a 2.951 day phase that presumably matches the rotation period. The pattern of variation shows that there are regions of the star's surface where the concentrations of elements differ. The star also displays short period variations on the order of 2.5 hours. It has a mean effective magnetic field value of 209×10^{−4} T.

The secondary, Omega Herculis B, is a magnitude 11.5 companion star. As of 2010, it was located at an angular separation of 0.80 arc seconds along a position angle of 294°.
