= HD 95086 b =

Exoplanet orbiting the young HD 95086

HD 95086 b / Levantes
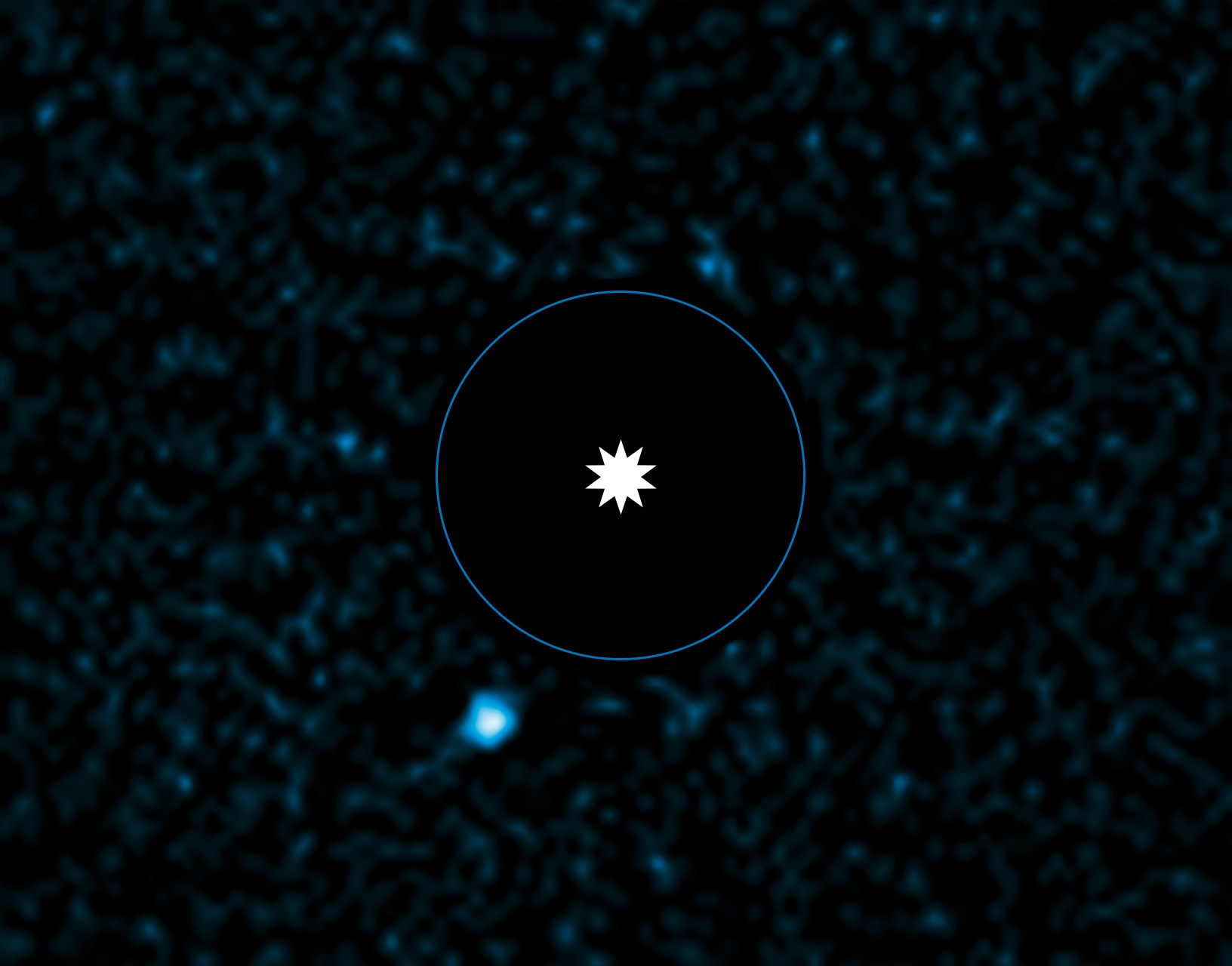
- VLT image of the star HD 95086 and its planetary companion, seen here as a blue smudge.

Discovery
- Discovered by: Rameau et al.
- Discovery site: Very Large Telescope
- Discovery date: 2013
- Detection method: Direct imaging

Designations
- Alternative names: Levantes

Orbital characteristics
- Semi-major axis: 51-73 AU
- Eccentricity: ≤ 0.18
- Inclination: 144+18 −4°
- Time of periastron: 2004+105 −45 d
- Star: HD 95086

Physical characteristics
- Mass: 5.0 ± 2.0 M_{J}
- Surface gravity: 3.85 ± 0.5 m/s^{2} (12.6 ± 1.6 ft/s^{2})
- Spectral type: L7–L9

HD 95086 b, formally named Levantes, is a confirmed, directly imaged exoplanet orbiting the young, 17 Myr A-class pre-main-sequence star HD 95086. It is roughly 5 times as massive as Jupiter and orbits about 70 AU away from the parent star. It was detected at thermal infrared wavelengths (3.8 μm) through direct imaging, using the NACO instrument on the VLT. A debris disk has been detected in this system at submillimeter wavelengths and has been resolved in the far-infrared from data obtained with the Herschel Space Observatory.

The host star was considered a highly probable member of the Lower Centaurus Crux star forming region, until tentatively reassigned with 71% probability to the Carina association. The star has a mass of 1.6 solar masses making it a late A type star. It is located approximately 90 parsecs away in the constellation of Carina.

== Nomenclature ==
In August 2022, this planet and its host star were included among 20 systems to be named by the third NameExoWorlds project. The approved names, proposed by a team from Greece, were announced in June 2023. HD 95086 b is named Levantes, from a modern Greek word referring to easterly Mediterranean winds, and its host star is named Aiolos after a Greek mythological figure.

== Discovery ==
The planet was initially detected in data taken in 2012 at a separation from the parent star of 623.9 ± 7.4 mas (~56 AU) and position angle of 151.8 ± 0.8 degrees. The planet was recovered at a high signal-to-noise ratio in June 2013. Astrometry for the planet in January 2012 and June 2013, and from a marginal detection in March 2013 confirm that it is bound to the parent star, not a background star. HD 95086 b's brightness at 3.8 μm when combined with sensitive upper limits on its brightness at shorter wavelengths is consistent with trends seen for other young, directly imaged planets like those around HR 8799. In particular, the lower limit of its 1.65–3.8 μm color of 3.1 magnitudes excludes background stars and most brown dwarfs.

Spatially resolved images of the system from the Herschel Space Observatory show evidence for a possible 2 belt system with a large clearing between the belts, similar to HR 8799. HD 95086 b is probably responsible for carving the sharp inner edge of the outer disk, but additional planets in this system occupying the rest of the gap may be a strong possibility.

== Physical properties ==
HD 95086 b is a massive planet that exists at a large orbital radius, therefore it is a viable candidate for a planet that formed close to its host star and was later scattered outwards via gravitational interactions with other massive particles in orbit around the star. In a debris disk, these particles are of the form of other orbiting planets or planetesimals. This scattering mechanism has been investigated for particles of the form of over-dense fluid elements like those found in a protoplanetary disk containing a planet. It has been proposed that scattering events could explain observed massive planets at large orbital radii.

The atmosphere of HD 95086 b contains large amounts of dust, probably small, sub-micrometer forsterite grains. The planet is very red in color, possibly due to the presence of the circumplanetary disk. Coronagraphic imaging with MIRI observations disfavour the presence of a circumplanetary disk.
