= Mercury–manganese star =

Type of star with a prominent spectral line due to absorption from ionized mercury

A mercury–manganese star (also HgMn star) is a type of chemically peculiar star with a prominent spectral line at 398.4 nm, due to absorption from ionized mercury. These stars are of spectral type B8, B9, or A0, corresponding to surface temperatures between about 10,000 and 15,000 K, with two distinctive characteristics:

- An atmospheric excess of elements like phosphorus, manganese, gallium, strontium, yttrium, zirconium, platinum and mercury.
- A lack of a strong dipole magnetic field.

Their rotation is relatively slow, and as a consequence their atmosphere is relatively calm. It is thought, but has not been proven, that some types of atoms sink under the force of gravity, while others are lifted towards the exterior of the star by radiation pressure, making a heterogeneous atmosphere.

== List ==
The following table includes the brightest stars in this group.

Name	Bayer or Flamsteed designation	Spectral type	Apparent visual magnitude
Alpheratz	α Andromedae	B8IVmnp	2.06
Gienah Corvi	γ Corvi A	B8III	2.59
Maia	20 Tauri	B8III	3.87
	χ Lupi	B9IV	3.96
Muliphein	γ Canis Majoris	B8II	4.10
	φ Herculis	B9mnp	4.23
	π^{1} Bootis	B9p	4.91
	HIP 79098	B9IVn	5.88
	ι Coronae Borealis	A0p	4.98
	κ Cancri A	B8IIImnp	5.24
	14 Sagittae	B9p	5.89
Dabih Minor	β Capricorni B	B9.5III/IV	6.10
	HD 30963	B9 III	7.23
Nath	β Tauri	B7III	1.65
	λ^{1} Sculptoris A	B9.5V	6.61
	53 Aurigae A	B9 Mn	5.74
