= Omega2 Aquilae =

Star in the constellation Aquila

ω^{2} Aquilae
- Location of ω^{2} Aquilae (circled)

Observation data Epoch J2000.0 Equinox J2000.0 (ICRS)
- Constellation: Aquila
- Right ascension: 19^{h} 19^{m} 53.067^{s}
- Declination: +11° 32′ 05.87″
- Apparent magnitude (V): 6.03

Characteristics
- Evolutionary stage: main sequence
- Spectral type: A2 V or F0V
- U−B color index: +0.087±0.007
- B−V color index: +0.08

Astrometry
| Radial velocity (R_{v}) | −26.0±4.3 km/s |
| Proper motion (μ) | RA: 44.335 mas/yr Dec.: 22.475 mas/yr |
| Parallax (π) | 11.6957±0.0366 mas |
| Distance | 278.9 ± 0.9 ly (85.5 ± 0.3 pc) |
| Absolute magnitude (M_{V}) | 1.48 |

Details
| Mass | 2.10±0.33 M_{☉} |
| Radius | 2.25±0.07 R_{☉} |
| Luminosity | 23.4±1.0 L_{☉} |
| Surface gravity (log g) | 4.06±0.07 cgs |
| Temperature | 8,472±125 K |
| Rotational velocity (v sin i) | 152 km/s |
| Age | 224 Myr |

Other designations
- ω^{2} Aql, 29 Aquilae, BD+11°3802, GC 26660, HD 181383, HIP 95002, HR 7332, SAO 104728, PPM 136128

Database references
| SIMBAD | data |

Omega^{2} Aquilae is a star in the equatorial constellation of Aquila, the eagle. Its name is a Bayer designation that is Latinized from ω^{2} Aquilae, and abbreviated Omega^{2} Aql or ω^{2} Aql. This star has an apparent visual magnitude of 6.0, which is close to the lower limit of detectability with the naked eye. According to the Bortle Dark-Sky Scale, this star can be viewed from dark rural skies. As the Earth orbits about the Sun, this star undergoes a parallax shift of 11.7 mas. This is equivalent to a physical distance of 279 light-years (86 parsecs) from Earth. The star is drifting closer to the Sun with a radial velocity of −26 km/s.

Analysis of the spectrum of this white-hued star shows it to match a stellar classification of A2 V, indicating it is an A-type main sequence star. (A 2001 study found a discrepant class of F0V.) It has about 2.25 the size and 2.1 times the mass of the Sun. The star is radiating 23.4 times the luminosity of the Sun from its photosphere at an effective temperature of 9,245 K, giving it the white hue of an A-type star. Omega^{2} Aquilae is 224 million years old and is spinning rapidly with a projected rotational velocity of 152 km/s.
