= HJ 2814 =

Quintuple star system in the constellation Serpens

Observation data Epoch J2000 Equinox J2000
- Constellation: Serpens
- A
- Right ascension: 17^{h} 56^{m} 19.0355^{s}
- Declination: −15° 48′ 45.101″
- Apparent magnitude (V): 5.929±0.010
- B
- Right ascension: 17^{h} 56^{m} 19.6077^{s}
- Declination: −15° 49′ 04.114″
- Apparent magnitude (V): 8.89

Characteristics

A
- Evolutionary stage: main sequence
- Spectral type: A0V (Aa1)

B
- Evolutionary stage: main sequence + main sequence
- Spectral type: G0V

Astrometry

A
Radial velocity (R_{v})	−24±10 km/s
Proper motion (μ)	RA: −1.602 mas/yr Dec.: −72.684 mas/yr
Parallax (π)	12.7459±0.0976 mas
Distance	256 ± 2 ly (78.5 ± 0.6 pc)

B
Radial velocity (R_{v})	−9.2±0.3 km/s
Proper motion (μ)	RA: −4.831 mas/yr Dec.: −65.535 mas/yr
Parallax (π)	12.3775±0.0403 mas
Distance	263.5 ± 0.9 ly (80.8 ± 0.3 pc)

Orbit
Primary	Aa1
Secondary	Aa2
Period (P)	13.4191±0.0003 days
Semi-major axis (a)	0.16±0.01 au
Eccentricity (e)	0.36±0.02
Inclination (i)	151+12 −17°
Longitude of the node (Ω)	306.3±5.8°
Argument of periastron (ω) (secondary)	252.3±4.7°
Semi-amplitude (K_{1}) (primary)	36.7±2.8 km/s

Orbit
Primary	Aa
Secondary	Ab
Period (P)	69.5+7.3 −6.8 yr
Semi-major axis (a)	26.5±1.9 au
Eccentricity (e)	0.29±0.03
Inclination (i)	106.5±1.4°
Longitude of the node (Ω)	322±2°
Periastron epoch (T)	1996.7±1.1

Orbit
Primary	Ba
Secondary	Bb
Period (P)	728.96±0.79 days
Semi-major axis (a)	0.761±0.008 au
Eccentricity (e)	0.500±0.038
Inclination (i)	133.1±0.5°
Periastron epoch (T)	53759.4±9.11 JD
Argument of periastron (ω) (secondary)	135.3±1.1°
Semi-amplitude (K_{1}) (primary)	10.4±0.8 km/s
Semi-amplitude (K_{2}) (secondary)	16.3±1.9 km/s

Details

Aa1
Mass	2.03 M_{☉}
Radius	1.93 R_{☉}
Luminosity	23.8±1.8 L_{☉}
Temperature	8,873 K
Age	400 Myr

Aa2
Mass	0.85 M_{☉}
Radius	0.76 R_{☉}
Temperature	5,115 K
Age	400 Myr

Ab
Mass	0.77 M_{☉}
Radius	0.70 R_{☉}
Temperature	4,722 K
Age	400 Myr

Ba
Mass	0.94±0.06 M_{☉}

Bb
Mass	0.66±0.03 M_{☉}

Other designations
- HJ 2814, ADS 10891, CCDM J17563-1549, WDS J17563-1549
- A: BD−15 4722, HD 163336, HIP 87813, HR 6681, SAO 160915, TIC 210131774, TYC 6250-386-1
- B: BD−15 4723, SAO 160916, TIC 210141857, TYC 6250-558-1

Database references
SIMBAD	A
- B

HJ 2814 (WDS J17563-1549) is a five-star system within the constellation Serpens.

== Properties ==
The quintuple system HJ 2814 is arranged in two subsystems: The triple system HIP 87813 (HJ 2814 A) and the binary HJ 2814 B. Those subsystems are separated by 1,600 astronomical units, and the orbital period is an estimated 26,000 years.

HIP 87813 comprises an inner binary system (Aa, with components Aa1 and Aa2) and an outer third star (Ab), which orbits the inner pair. The stars Aa1 and Aa2 are separated by 0.16 au and take 13.4 days to complete an orbit. Aa1 is an A-type main-sequence star with 2.03 times the mass of the Sun and 1.93 times the Sun's radius, while Aa2 is smaller, at 0.85 times the mass and 0.76 times the radius of the Sun. Component Ab is separated by 27 au from the inner pair and takes 70 years to complete an orbit. It has 0.77 times the mass and 0.70 times the Sun's radius. The Aa1-Aa2 pair has a close separation and can only be resolved by interferometry, while Aa-Ab are detectable with adaptive optics. Star Ab was also detected indirectly via astrometry, hence HIP 87813 is an astrometric binary. The apparent magnitude of HIP 87813 is 5.929, faintly visible to the naked eye only under ideal conditions, in dark skies.

HJ 2814 B is a pair of stars orbiting each other at an orbital period of 729 days (2.00 years). They are separated by a semi-major axis of 0.76 au and have a moderate eccentricity of 0.5. The components are named (HJ 2814) Ba and Bb, with masses of 0.94 and 0.66 times solar, respectively. The combined spectrum appears to be G0V.

Parallax measurements of the component A by the Gaia spacecraft indicate a distance of 256 light-years (78 parsecs). While the parallax listed in the Gaia database for component B is unreliable, a dynamical parallax indicates a distance of 263.5 light-years (80.8 parsecs).
