= V Cephei =

Star in the constellation Cepheus

Observation data Epoch J2000 Equinox ICRS
- Constellation: Cepheus
- Right ascension: 23^{h} 56^{m} 27.804^{s}
- Declination: +83° 11′ 28.02″
- Apparent magnitude (V): 6.57

Characteristics
- Evolutionary stage: main sequence
- Spectral type: A1V
- B−V color index: +0.07

Astrometry
Radial velocity (R_{v})	−18.74 km/s
Proper motion (μ)	RA: +50.676 mas/yr Dec.: +6.869 mas/yr
Parallax (π)	11.1865±0.0264 mas
Distance	291.6 ± 0.7 ly (89.4 ± 0.2 pc)
Absolute magnitude (M_{V})	+1.78

Details
Mass	2.27 M_{☉}
Radius	1.7 R_{☉}
Luminosity	17.4 L_{☉}
Surface gravity (log g)	4.33 cgs
Temperature	9,004 K
Metallicity [Fe/H]	−0.25 dex
Rotational velocity (v sin i)	147 km/s
Age	373 Myr

Other designations
- V Cep, BD+82°743, FK5 1650, HD 224309, HIP 118027, HR 9056, SAO 3994

Database references
SIMBAD	data

V Cephei is a white main sequence star in the constellation Cepheus. It only varies slightly by 0.03 of a magnitude. It was suspected of being variable by American astronomer Seth Carlo Chandler noting in 1890 that it varied by 0.7 magnitude but that it needed more confirmation. Subsequent observers were divided in whether they noted variability or not. A subsequent study with photoelectric photometry showed no variability.

With a spectral class of A1V, V Cephei is a main sequence star with a surface temperature of 9,004 K. It has twice the mass of the Sun and, with nearly twice its radius, it shines at 17 L_{☉}.
