= Omicron Capricorni =

Star in the constellation Capricornus

- Location of ο Capricorni (circled)

Observation data Epoch J2000.0 Equinox ICRS
Constellation	Capricornus
- ο Cap A
Right ascension	20^{h} 29^{m} 53.909^{s}
Declination	−18° 34′ 59.46″
- Apparent magnitude (V): +5.94
- ο Cap B
Right ascension	20^{h} 29^{m} 52.594^{s}
Declination	−18° 35′ 10.90″
- Apparent magnitude (V): +6.74

Characteristics

ο Cap A
- Evolutionary stage: main sequence
- Spectral type: A1 V
- U−B color index: +0.30
- B−V color index: +0.08

ο Cap B
- Evolutionary stage: main sequence
- Spectral type: A7/8 V
- U−B color index: +0.04
- B−V color index: +0.22

Astrometry

ο Cap A
Radial velocity (R_{v})	−12.4±1.3 km/s
Proper motion (μ)	RA: +29.058 mas/yr Dec.: −81.326 mas/yr
Parallax (π)	14.0193±0.0402 mas
Distance	232.6 ± 0.7 ly (71.3 ± 0.2 pc)

ο Cap B
Radial velocity (R_{v})	−9.1±0.6 km/s
Proper motion (μ)	RA: +29.266 mas/yr Dec.: −81.577 mas/yr
Parallax (π)	14.0435±0.0266 mas
Distance	232.2 ± 0.4 ly (71.2 ± 0.1 pc)

Details

ο Cap A
Mass	1.96±0.09 M_{☉}
Radius	1.92^{+0.13}_{−0.15} R_{☉}
Luminosity	18.6 L_{☉}
Surface gravity (log g)	4.23 cgs
Temperature	10,492±357 K
Metallicity [Fe/H]	0.00^{+0.12}_{−0.11} dex
Rotational velocity (v sin i)	276 km/s
Age	118 Myr

ο Cap B
Mass	1.83 M_{☉}
Radius	1.57 R_{☉}
Luminosity	8.1 L_{☉}
Surface gravity (log g)	4.31 cgs
Temperature	7,762 K
Rotational velocity (v sin i)	136 km/s
Age	387 Myr

Other designations
- ο Cap, 12 Cap, ADS 13902, CCDM J20299-1835
- ο Cap A: BD−19°5831, GC 28503, HD 195094, HIP 101123, HR 7830, SAO 163626
- ο Cap B: BD−19°5830, GC 28502, HD 195093, HIP 101120, HR 7829, SAO 163625

Database references
SIMBAD	A
- B

Omicron Capricorni is a wide binary star system in the constellation Capricornus. Its name is a Bayer designation that is Latinized from ο Capricorni, and abbreviated Omicron Cap or ο Cap. The brighter component has an apparent visual magnitude of +5.94, which is near the lower limit on stellar brightness that still can be seen with the naked eye. Based upon an annual parallax shift of 14.02 mas as seen from Earth, this system is located at a distance of 233 light-years (71 pc) from the Sun. The proximity of this system to the ecliptic means it is subject to lunar occultation.

Large but uncertain discrepancies in the parallax measurements from Hipparcos may indicate, weakly, that there is a third, unseen companion in the system.

Both visible components are white-hued A-type main-sequence stars. The primary, component A, sometimes called ο^{1} Capricorni, has an apparent magnitude of +5.94, while the companion, component B or ο^{2} Capricorni, has an apparent magnitude of +6.74. The two stars are currently separated by 21.91 arcseconds, corresponding to a projected separation of around 2,100 AU. At the estimated age of around 118 million years old, both components are spinning rapidly: component A has a projected rotational velocity of 276 km/s, while component B is 136 km/s.
