= Xi2 Capricorni =

Star in the constellation Capricornus

Xi^{2} Capricorni
Observation data Epoch J2000.0 Equinox J2000.0 (ICRS)
- Constellation: Capricornus
- Right ascension: 20^{h} 12^{m} 25.871^{s}
- Declination: −12° 37′ 02.99″
- Apparent magnitude (V): +5.83

Characteristics
- Evolutionary stage: main sequence
- Spectral type: F7 V Fe−0.5
- B−V color index: +0.46

Astrometry
Radial velocity (R_{v})	+27.1 km/s
Proper motion (μ)	RA: +193.111 mas/yr Dec.: −195.662 mas/yr
Parallax (π)	35.4185±0.0351 mas
Distance	92.09 ± 0.09 ly (28.23 ± 0.03 pc)
Absolute magnitude (M_{V})	3.64±0.02

Details
Mass	1.23±0.04 M_{☉}
Radius	1.50±0.03 R_{☉}
Luminosity	3.07±0.01 L_{☉}
Surface gravity (log g)	4.151±0.001 cgs
Temperature	6,248±1 K
Metallicity [Fe/H]	−0.25±0.05 dex
Rotational velocity (v sin i)	11 km/s
Age	3.47±0.53 Gyr

Other designations
- ξ^{2} Cap, 2 Cap, BD−13°5608, GC 28035, GJ 4139, HD 191862, HIP 99572, HR 7715, SAO 163337, CCDM J20124-1237, WDS J20124-1237A

Database references
SIMBAD	data

Xi^{2} Capricorni is a yellow-white hued star in the southern constellation of Capricornus. Its name is a Bayer designation that is Latinized from ξ^{2} Capricorni, and abbreviated Xi^{2} Cap or ξ^{2} Cap. This star is dimly visible to the naked eye on a dark night, having an apparent visual magnitude of +5.83. Based upon an annual parallax shift of 35.42 mas as seen from Earth, this system is located at a distance of 92 light-years (28 pc) from the Sun. It is drifting further away with a line of sight velocity of +27 km/s.

This is an F-type main-sequence star with a stellar classification of F7 V Fe−0.5, where the suffix notation indicates the spectrum displays a mild underabundance of iron. It is around 3.5 billion years old and is spinning with a projected rotational velocity of 11 km/s. The star has 1.2 times the mass of the Sun and 1.5 times the Sun's radius. It is radiating three times the luminosity of the Sun from its photosphere at an effective temperature of 6,248 K.

Although considered a single star, there is reason to suspect it forms a wide physical pair with the visual magnitude 10.94 red dwarf star LP 754–50. They have a projected separation of 28,300±300 AU, with LP 754–50 having an estimated 0.55 times the mass of the Sun. If they are gravitationally bound, their orbital period would be around 3.7 million years.
