= 13 Sagittae =

Star in the constellation Sagitta

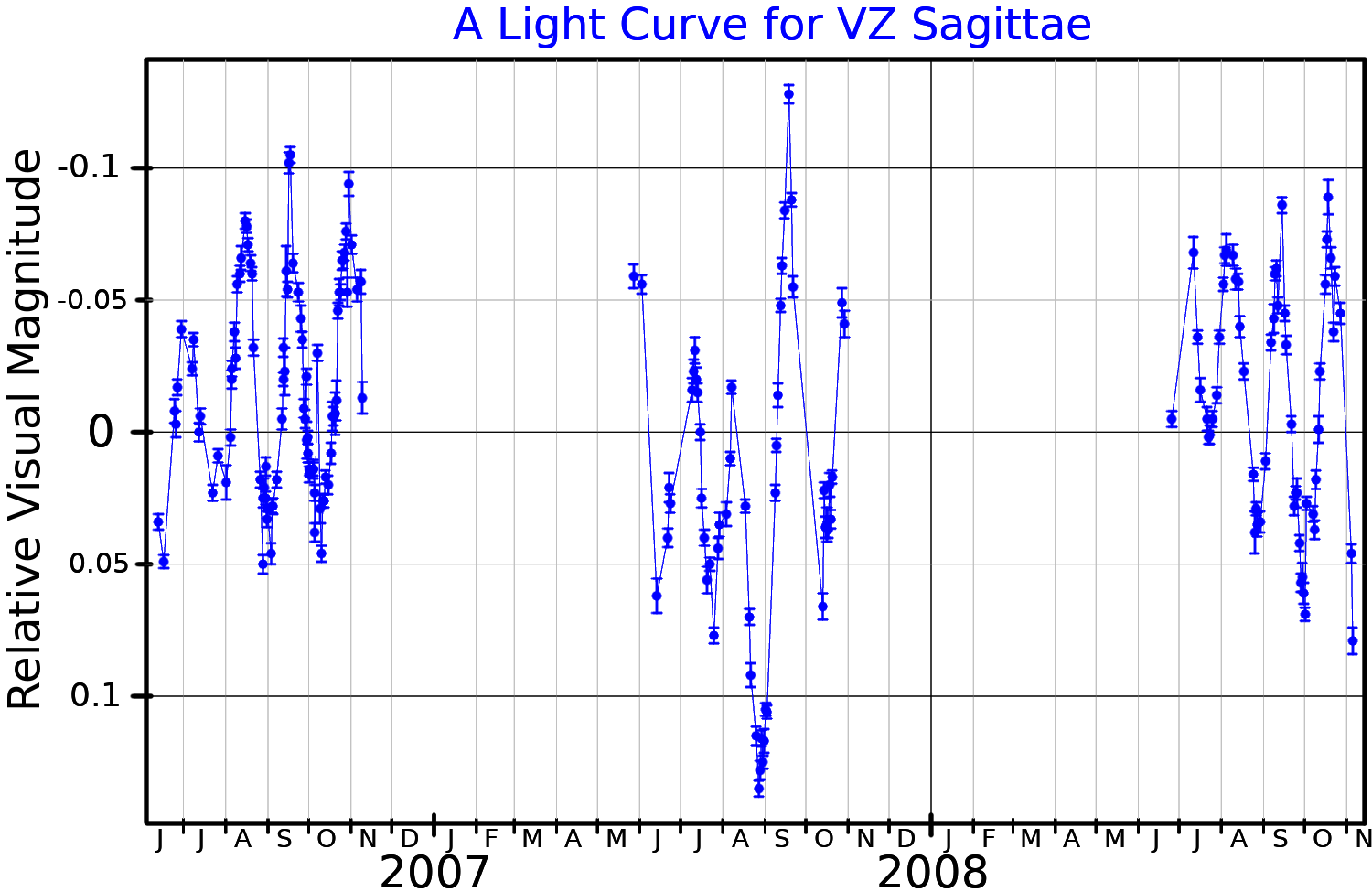
- A visual band light curve for VZ Sagittae, plotted from data published by Tabur et al. (2009)

Observation data Epoch J2000 Equinox ICRS
- Constellation: Sagitta
- Right ascension: 20^{h} 00^{m} 03.30846^{s}
- Declination: +17° 30′ 59.4373″
- Apparent magnitude (V): 5.27 - 5.57

Characteristics
- Evolutionary stage: AGB
- Spectral type: M4 III
- B−V color index: 1.576±0.010
- Variable type: semiregular

Astrometry
Radial velocity (R_{v})	−17.56±0.33 km/s
Proper motion (μ)	RA: +1.75 mas/yr Dec.: −12.41 mas/yr
Parallax (π)	3.20±0.31 mas
Distance	1,020 ± 100 ly (310 ± 30 pc)
Absolute magnitude (M_{V})	−2.12

Details
Mass	2.8 M_{☉}
Radius	185.7 R_{☉}
Luminosity	2173.57 L_{☉}
Surface gravity (log g)	3.00 cgs
Temperature	3,844±251 K
Metallicity [Fe/H]	−0.32 dex

Other designations
- 13 Sge, VZ Sge, BD+17°4183, HD 189577, HIP 98438, HR 7645, SAO 105522, WDS J20001+1731C

Database references
SIMBAD	data

13 Sagittae is a single star in the northern constellation of Sagitta. The designation comes from the star catalogue of John Flamsteed, first published in 1712. It can be viewed with the naked eye, having an apparent visual magnitude varying between 5.27 and 5.57. Based upon an annual parallax shift of 3.20 mas as seen from Earth's orbit, it is located at a distance of around 310 parsecs (1,000 ly). It is moving closer to the Sun with a heliocentric radial velocity of −17.56 km/s.

Pulsation Cycles
Period (days)	Amplitude (magnitude)
36.5	0.082
39.2	0.043
51.4	0.031
65.2	0.030

This is an evolved red giant with a stellar classification of M4 III – a star that has used up its core hydrogen and has expanded – and is currently on the asymptotic giant branch. Classified as a semiregular variable and given the variable star designation VZ Sagittae, it varies between apparent magnitudes 5.27 and 5.57. Il has expanded to around 186 times the Sun's radius.

There is a magnitude 9.96 companion located at an angular separation of 112.6 arcseconds along a position angle of 297°, as of 2013. Designated HD 351107, this is a class F0 star.

John Flamsteed labelled this star as x Sagittae, (sometimes interpreted as Chi Sagittae) but the designation was dropped by later authors and is now largely unknown.
