= 14 Sagittae =

Binary star system in the constellation Aquila

Observation data Epoch J2000 Equinox ICRS
- Constellation: Aquila
- Right ascension: 20^{h} 03^{m} 30.01476^{s}
- Declination: +16° 01′ 52.5083″
- Apparent magnitude (V): 5.89

Characteristics
- Evolutionary stage: main sequence
- Spectral type: B9p HgMn
- U−B color index: −0.44
- B−V color index: −0.06

Astrometry
Radial velocity (R_{v})	−21.7 km/s
Proper motion (μ)	RA: +5.420 mas/yr Dec.: −8.189 mas/yr
Parallax (π)	4.9546±0.0550 mas
Distance	658 ± 7 ly (202 ± 2 pc)
Absolute magnitude (M_{V})	−0.72

Orbit
Period (P)	61.541 d
Eccentricity (e)	0.49
Periastron epoch (T)	2440799.01 JD
Argument of periastron (ω) (secondary)	345°
Semi-amplitude (K_{1}) (primary)	4.2 km/s

Details

14 Sge A
Luminosity	291.53 L_{☉}
Surface gravity (log g)	3.60 cgs
Temperature	13,200 K
Rotational velocity (v sin i)	7.0±0.5 km/s

Other designations
- 14 Sge, BD+15°4033, GC 27812, HD 190229, HIP 98754, HR 7664, SAO 105615

Database references
SIMBAD	data

14 Sagittae is a binary star system in the equatorial constellation of Aquila. 14 Sagittae is the Flamsteed designation. It appears as a sixth magnitude star, near the lower limit of visibility to the naked eye, having an apparent visual magnitude of 5.89. The system is located 658 light years away, as determined from its annual parallax shift of 4.95 mas. It is moving closer to the Earth with a heliocentric radial velocity of –22 km/s.

This is a single-lined spectroscopic binary with an orbital period of 61.5 days and an eccentricity of 0.49. The visible component is a chemically peculiar mercury-manganese star with a stellar classification of B9p HgMn. It is narrow-lined with a projected rotational velocity of 7 km/s. The star is radiating 292 times the Sun's luminosity from its photosphere at an effective temperature of 13,200 K.

John Flamsteed labelled this star as y Sagittae, but the designation was dropped by later authors and is now largely unknown.
