= Ox (Chinese constellation) =

Chinese mansion constellation

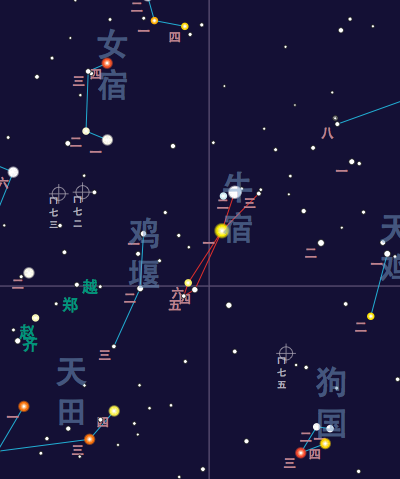
Niú Xiù map

The Ox mansion (牛宿, pinyin: Niú Xiù) is one of the Twenty-eight mansions of the Chinese constellations. It is one of the northern mansions of the Black Tortoise. The primary asterism of this mansion is centered on the tail of the constellation known as Capricornus in Western astronomy.

== Asterisms ==
English name	Chinese name	European constellation	Number of stars	Representing
Ox	牛	Capricornus	6	The ox hanged by the rope
Celestial Farmland	天田	Capricornus/Microscopium	4	Son from heaven
Nine Water Wells	九坎	Microscopium	4	Nine irrigation wells
Drum at the River	河鼓	Aquila	3	Military drums in the sky
Weaving Girl	織女	Lyra	3	The girl who skilled in weaving of fairy folk
Left Flag	左旗	Aquila/Sagitta	9	Banners in the left
Right Flag	右旗	Aquila	9	Banners in the right
Celestial Drumstick	天桴	Aquila	4	Drum at the River stick
Network of Dykes	羅堰	Capricornus	3	Mound for irrigation system
Clepsydra Terrace	漸臺	Lyra	4	Water for clepsydra
Imperial Passageway	輦道	Lyra/Cygnus	5	Passage for imperial chariot
