= List of stars in Sagitta =

This is the list of notable stars in the constellation Sagitta, sorted by decreasing brightness.

Name	B	F	Var	HD	HIP	RA	Dec	vis. mag.	abs. mag.	Dist. (ly)	Sp. class	Notes
γ Sge	γ	12		189319	98337	19^{h} 58^{m} 45.39^{s}	+19° 29′ 31.5″	3.51	−1.11	274	K5III	Telum, variable star, ΔV = 0.004^{m}, P = 6.37836 d
δ Sge	δ	7		187076	97365	19^{h} 47^{m} 23.27^{s}	+18° 32′ 03.3″	3.82	−1.87	448	M2II + B6	Zuoqi, semiregular variable, V_{max} = 3.75^{m}, V_{min} = 3.83^{m}
α Sge	α	5		185758	96757	19^{h} 40^{m} 05.78^{s}	+18° 00′ 50.2″	4.38	−1.42	473	G0II	Sham, Alsahm
β Sge	β	6		185958	96837	19^{h} 41^{m} 02.93^{s}	+17° 28′ 34.0″	4.38	−1.39	466	G8II	Shakh
ζ Sge	ζ	8		187362	97496	19^{h} 48^{m} 58.65^{s}	+19° 08′ 31.1″	5.01	0.01	326	A3V	
η Sge	η	16		190608	98920	20^{h} 05^{m} 09.47^{s}	+19° 59′ 27.2″	5.09	1.61	162	K2III	suspected variable
13 Sge		13	VZ	189577	98438	20^{h} 00^{m} 03.31^{s}	+17° 30′ 59.5″	5.33	−1.47	746	M4IIIa	semiregular variable, V_{max} = 5.27^{m}, V_{min} = 5.57^{m}
11 Sge		11		189090	98234	19^{h} 57^{m} 45.44^{s}	+16° 47′ 20.8″	5.54	0.07	404	B9III	
1 Sge		1		180317	94620	19^{h} 15^{m} 17.34^{s}	+21° 13′ 55.6″	5.65	0.71	318	A4V	
ε Sge	ε	4		185194	96516	19^{h} 37^{m} 17.38^{s}	+16° 27′ 46.0″	5.67	−0.14	473	G8IIIvar	suspected variable, V_{max} = 5.64^{m}, V_{min} = 5.67^{m}
S Sge		10	S	188727	98085	19^{h} 56^{m} 01.26^{s}	+16° 38′ 05.3″	5.71	−4.89	4289	G5Ibv SB	Cepheid variable, V_{max} = 5.24^{m}, V_{min} = 6.04^{m}, P = 8.382086 d
15 Sge		15		190406	98819	20^{h} 04^{m} 06.47^{s}	+17° 04′ 16.2″	5.80	4.56	58	G1V	binary star; suspected variable, V_{max} = 5.77^{m}, V_{min} = 5.80^{m}
HD 193579				193579	100276	20^{h} 20^{m} 21.40^{s}	+17° 47′ 34.8″	5.82	−0.01	477	K5III	
HD 190211				190211	98738	20^{h} 03^{m} 16.39^{s}	+18° 30′ 03.7″	5.99	−1.09	849	K3Iab:	
HD 180242				180242	94598	19^{h} 15^{m} 02.69^{s}	+20° 12′ 11.3″	6.03	−0.70	724	G8III	suspected variable, V_{max} = 6^{m}, V_{min} = 6.04^{m}
HD 178428				178428	93966	19^{h} 07^{m} 57.28^{s}	+16° 51′ 14.9″	6.08	4.47	68	G5V	spectroscopic binary
HD 177199				177199	93523	19^{h} 02^{m} 52.62^{s}	+19° 39′ 39.7″	6.11	−2.26	1538	K1III	
18 Sge		18		192836	99913	20^{h} 16^{m} 19.78^{s}	+21° 35′ 55.5″	6.11	1.31	298	K1III	
9 Sge		9	QZ	188001	97796	19^{h} 52^{m} 21.77^{s}	+18° 40′ 18.8″	6.23	−6.96	14174	O8e	spectroscopic eclipsing binary, V_{max} = 6.16^{m}, V_{min} = 6.23^{m}
HD 191814				191814	99445	20^{h} 11^{m} 03.53^{s}	+21° 08′ 04.2″	6.24	0.25	514	K0	
2 Sge		2		182490	95398	19^{h} 24^{m} 22.08^{s}	+16° 56′ 15.9″	6.27	1.08	355	A2III-IV	
V340 Sge			V340	185622	96688	19^{h} 39^{m} 25.34^{s}	+16° 34′ 16.1″	6.37	−2.87	2296	M0Iab-Ib SB	slow irregular variable
V344 Sge			V344	191178	99176	20^{h} 08^{m} 06.50^{s}	+16° 39′ 51.7″	6.39	−4.18	4234	M3III	irregular variable
HD 180377				180377	94646	19^{h} 15^{m} 33.37^{s}	+18° 30′ 58.8″	6.46	−1.13	1072	M2III	semiregular variable
HD 176776				176776	93374	19^{h} 01^{m} 05.43^{s}	+19° 18′ 34.6″	6.47	0.74	457	K1III	
U Sge			U	181182	94910	19^{h} 18^{m} 48.41^{s}	+19° 36′ 37.7″	6.50	−0.96	1012	B8III + K	Algol variable, V_{max} = 6.45^{m}, V_{min} = 9.28^{m}, P = 3.38061933 d
θ Sge A	θ	17		191570	99352	20^{h} 09^{m} 56.61^{s}	+20° 54′ 53.2″	6.51	3.24	147	F5IV	
V338 Sge			V338	179588	94377	19^{h} 12^{m} 34.45^{s}	+16° 50′ 47.1″	6.69		791	B9IV	Eclipsing binary
3 Sge		3		182571	95435	19^{h} 24^{m} 45.39^{s}	+16° 57′ 25.4″	6.84	1.36	407	A0	
HD 183143			HT	183143	95657	19^{h} 27^{m} 26.56^{s}	+18° 17′ 45.2″	6.86		7100	B7Iae	Alpha Cygni variable, V_{max} = 6.71^{m}, V_{min} = 6.95^{m}, P = 40.44 d
θ Sge B	θ	17		191571		20^{h} 09^{m} 52.30^{s}	+20° 53′ 47.0″	8.90				component of the θ Sge system
HD 231701				231701	96078	19^{h} 32^{m} 04.16^{s}	+16° 28′ 27.4″	8.99	3.81	354	F8V	Uruk; has a planet (b)
R Sge			R	192388		20^{h} 14^{m} 03.75^{s}	+16° 43′ 35.1″	9.20			G0Ib	RV Tauri variable, V_{max} = 8.0^{m}, V_{min} = 10.5^{m}, P = 70.77 d
FG Sge			FG		99527	20^{h} 11^{m} 56.06^{s}	+20° 20′ 04.4″	9.45		606	B4Ieq-K2Ib	V_{max} = 8.7^{m}, V_{min} = 18.1^{m}
V Sge			V			20^{h} 20^{m} 14.69^{s}	+21° 06′ 10.44″	9.6-13		7800		prototype V Sagittae variable, V_{max} = 8.16^{m}, V_{min} = 13.9^{m}, P = 0.514195 d
GY Sge			GY			19^{h} 35^{m} 13.63^{s}	+19° 12′ 08.6″	9.84				Cepheid variable, V_{max} = 9.84^{m}, V_{min} = 10.60^{m}, P = 51.0625 d
HAT-P-34						20^{h} 12^{m} 47^{s}	+17° 37′ 41.2″	10.16		838	F8	Sansuna; has a transiting planet (b)
SV Sge			SV		93987	19^{h} 08^{m} 11.77^{s}	+16° 43′ 35.1″	10.3			Rv...	R Coronae Borealis variable, V_{max} = 10.3^{m}, V_{min} = 16.5^{m}, P = 56.64 d
HD 187282			QT	187282	97456	19^{h} 48^{m} 32.20^{s}	+18° 12′ 03.7″	10.51			WN4	Wolf–Rayet star, ΔV = 0.04^{m}
QW Sge			QW			19^{h} 45^{m} 49.54^{s}	+18° 36′ 47.8″	11.0			M6	Z Andromedae variable, V_{max} = 11.0^{m}, V_{min} = 12.8^{m}, P = 517 d
HM Sge			HM			19^{h} 41^{m} 57.09^{s}	+16° 44′ 39.9″	11.10			M7	Nova and Mira variable
WR 124			QR		94289	19^{h} 11^{m} 30.88^{s}	+16° 51′ 38.2″	11.12			WN8	Merrill's Star; Wolf–Rayet star, V_{max} = 11.04^{m}, V_{min} = 11.12^{m}
RZ Sge			RZ			20^{h} 03^{m} 18.47^{s}	+17° 02′ 51.9″	12.3				SU Ursae Majoris variable, V_{max} = 12.3^{m}, V_{min} = 17.7^{m}, P = 0.0682803 d
QY Sge			QY			20^{h} 07^{m} 54.62^{s}	+18° 42′ 54.5″	12.37			G0e...	semiregular variable, V_{max} = 12.37^{m}, V_{min} = 12.57^{m}
UU Sge			UU			19^{h} 42^{m} 10.30^{s}	+17° 05′ 14.4″	14.67			sdO+G	Algol variable in planetary nebula, V_{max} = 14.18^{m}, V_{min} = 15.59^{m}, P = 0.46506918 d
WZ Sge			WZ			20^{h} 07^{m} 36.50^{s}	+17° 42′ 14.8″	15.20			DAepv	prototype WZ Sagittae variable
Black Widow Pulsar			QX			19^{h} 59^{m} 36.77^{s}	+20° 48′ 15.1″	20.4				eclipsing binary/millisecond pulsar, V_{max} = 20.4^{m}, V_{min} = 23.0^{m}, P = 0.381967 d
WY Sge			WY			19^{h} 32^{m} 43.82^{s}	+17° 44′ 55.9″					nova; dwarf nova; Algol variable
PSR B1944+17						19^{h} 46^{m} 53.04^{s}	+18° 05′ 41.2″					pulsar
Table legend: • Name = Proper name • B = Bayer designation • F or/and G. = Flamsteed designation or Gould designation • Var = Variable-star designation • HD = Henry Draper Catalogue designation number • HIP = Hipparcos Catalogue designation number • RA = Right ascension for the Epoch/Equinox J2000.0 • Dec = Declination for the Epoch/Equinox J2000.0 • vis. mag. = visual magnitude (m or m_{v}), also known as apparent magnitude • abs. mag. = absolute magnitude (M_{v}) • Dist. (ly) = Distance in light-years from Earth • Sp. class = Spectral class of the star in the stellar classification system • Notes = Common name(s) or alternate name(s); comments; notable properties [for example: multiple star status, range of variability if it is a variable star, exoplanets, etc.]

== See also ==
- List of stars by constellation
