= Sagitta in Chinese astronomy =

According to traditional Chinese uranography, the modern constellation Sagitta is located within the northern quadrant of the sky, which is symbolized as the Black Tortoise of the North (北方玄武, Běi Fāng Xuán Wǔ).

The name of the western constellation in modern Chinese is 天箭座 (tiān jiàn zuò), meaning "the heavenly arrow constellation".

== Stars ==
The map of Chinese constellation in constellation Sagitta area consists of:

Four Symbols	Mansion (Chinese name)	Romanization	Translation	Asterisms (Chinese name)	Romanization	Translation	Western star name	Proper Name	Chinese star name	Romanization	Translation
Three Enclosures (三垣)	紫微垣	Zǐ Wēi Yuán	Purple Forbidden enclosure	天市左垣	Tiānshìzuǒyuán	Left Wall	1 Sge		齐增二	Qízēngèr	2nd additional star of Qi
The Black Tortoise of the North (北方玄武)
The Black Tortoise of the North (北方玄武)	牛	Niú	Ox	左旗	Zuǒqí	Left Flag					
The Black Tortoise of the North (北方玄武)	牛	Niú	Ox	左旗	Zuǒqí	Left Flag	α Sge	Sham	左旗一	Zuǒqíyī	1st star
The Black Tortoise of the North (北方玄武)	牛	Niú	Ox	左旗	Zuǒqí	Left Flag	β Sge	Shakh	左旗二	Zuǒqíèr	2nd star
The Black Tortoise of the North (北方玄武)	牛	Niú	Ox	左旗	Zuǒqí	Left Flag	δ Sge	Zuoqi	左旗三	Zuǒqísān	3rd star
The Black Tortoise of the North (北方玄武)	牛	Niú	Ox	左旗	Zuǒqí	Left Flag	γ Sge	Telum	左旗四	Zuǒqísì	4th star
The Black Tortoise of the North (北方玄武)	牛	Niú	Ox	左旗	Zuǒqí	Left Flag	ζ Sge		左旗五	Zuǒqíwǔ	5th star
The Black Tortoise of the North (北方玄武)	牛	Niú	Ox	左旗	Zuǒqí	Left Flag	13 Sge		左旗六	Zuǒqíliù	6th star
The Black Tortoise of the North (北方玄武)	牛	Niú	Ox	左旗	Zuǒqí	Left Flag	11 Sge		左旗七	Zuǒqíqī	7th star
The Black Tortoise of the North (北方玄武)	牛	Niú	Ox	左旗	Zuǒqí	Left Flag	14 Sge		左旗八	Zuǒqíbā	8th star
The Black Tortoise of the North (北方玄武)	牛	Niú	Ox	左旗	Zuǒqí	Left Flag	ε Sge		左旗增一	Zuǒqízēngyī	1st additional star
The Black Tortoise of the North (北方玄武)	牛	Niú	Ox	左旗	Zuǒqí	Left Flag	3 Sge		左旗增二	Zuǒqízēngèr	2nd additional star
The Black Tortoise of the North (北方玄武)	牛	Niú	Ox	左旗	Zuǒqí	Left Flag	2 Sge		左旗增三	Zuǒqízēngsān	3rd additional star
The Black Tortoise of the North (北方玄武)	牛	Niú	Ox	左旗	Zuǒqí	Left Flag	18 Sge		左旗增廿四	Zuǒqízēngèrshísì	24th additional star
The Black Tortoise of the North (北方玄武)	牛	Niú	Ox	左旗	Zuǒqí	Left Flag	θ Sge		左旗增廿五	Zuǒqízēngèrshíwǔ	25th additional star
The Black Tortoise of the North (北方玄武)	牛	Niú	Ox	左旗	Zuǒqí	Left Flag	η Sge		左旗增廿六	Zuǒqízēngèrshíliù	26th additional star
The Black Tortoise of the North (北方玄武)	牛	Niú	Ox	左旗	Zuǒqí	Left Flag	15 Sge		左旗增廿七	Zuǒqízēngèrshíqī	27th additional star
The Black Tortoise of the North (北方玄武)	牛	Niú	Ox	左旗	Zuǒqí	Left Flag	10 Sge		左旗增廿八	Zuǒqízēngèrshíbā	28th additional star
The Black Tortoise of the North (北方玄武)	牛	Niú	Ox	左旗	Zuǒqí	Left Flag	9 Sge		左旗增廿九	Zuǒqízēngèrshíjiǔ	29th additional star

== See also ==
- Chinese astronomy
- Traditional Chinese star names
- Chinese constellations
