= Herculia =

Herculia or Herculius may refer to:

== Ancient Roman military units ==
- Cohors I Herculia Raetorum
- Legio II Herculia
- Legio VI Herculia

== Other uses ==
- Herculia (moth), a genus of snout moths
- Aegyptus Herculia, an Ancient Roman province of Egypt
- Gorsium-Herculia, now Tác, Hungary
- Via Herculia, a Roman road in Italia

== See also ==
- Hercules
- Herculea
