= Z Sagittae =

The Bayer designation z Sagittae and the variable star designation Z Sagittae are distinct. Due to technical limitations, both designations link here. For the star

- Z Sagittae, a Mira variable
- z Sagittae, (15 Sagittae), a designation by John Flamsteed.
