= QR Andromedae =

Eclipsing binary star in the constellation Andromeda

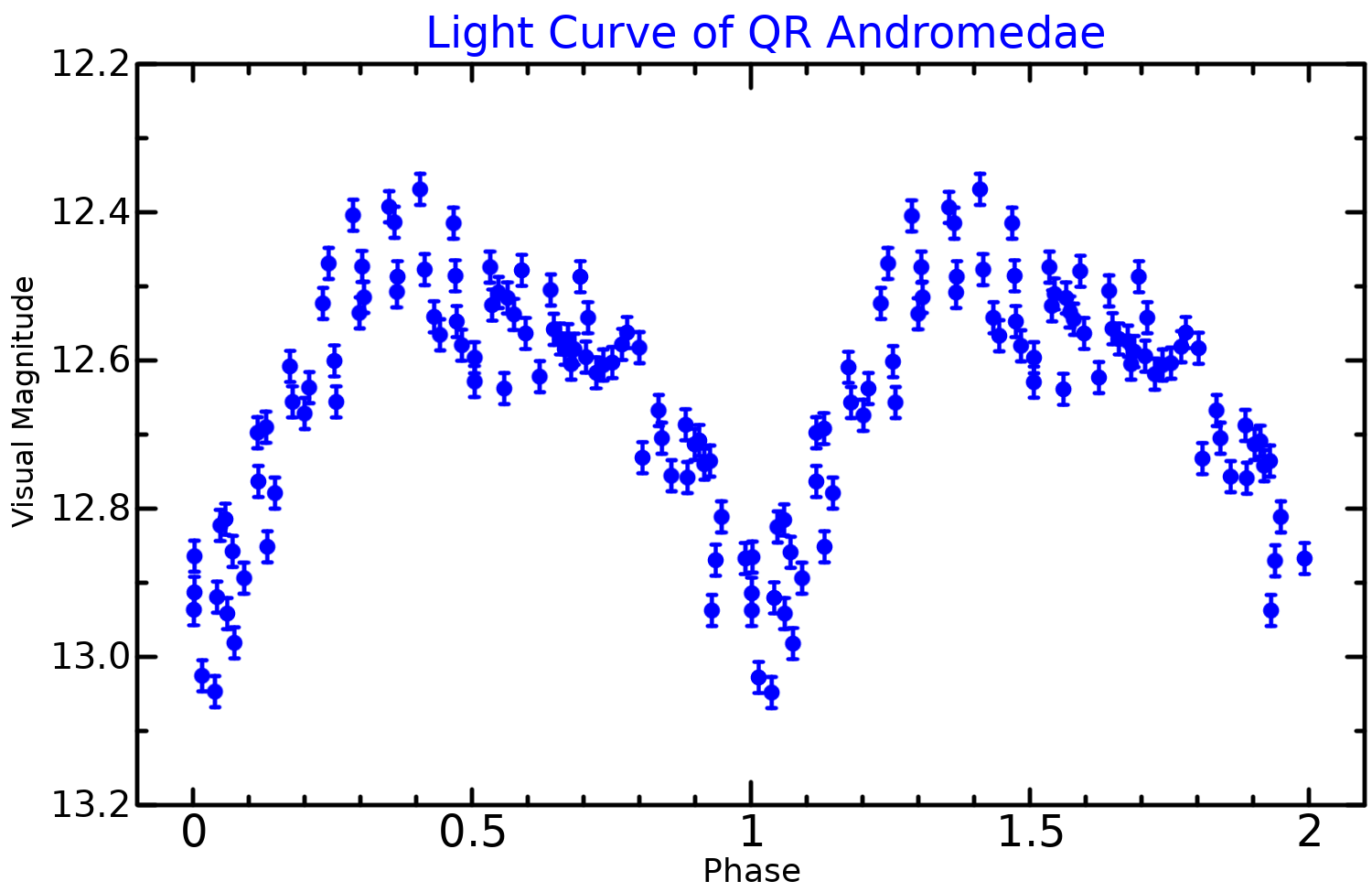
- The visual band light curve of QR Andromedae (adapted from Matsumoto (1996)), The phase is with respect to the 15.85 hour orbital period.

Observation data Epoch J2000 Equinox ICRS
- Constellation: Andromeda
- Right ascension: 00^{h} 19^{m} 49.9253^{s}
- Declination: +21° 56′ 52.167″
- Apparent magnitude (V): 12.16 – 13.07 variable

Characteristics
- Spectral type: pec(e)
- Apparent magnitude (B): 12.38
- Apparent magnitude (R): 11.86
- Apparent magnitude (G): 12.2395
- Apparent magnitude (J): 12.432
- Apparent magnitude (H): 12.295
- Apparent magnitude (K): 12.092
- Variable type: Algol

Astrometry
| Proper motion (μ) | RA: 18.469±0.071 mas/yr Dec.: −5.529±0.079 mas/yr |
| Parallax (π) | 0.4993±0.0452 mas |
| Distance | 6,500 ± 600 ly (2,000 ± 200 pc) |

Orbit
| Period (P) | 0.6604 days |
| Semi-amplitude (K_{1}) (primary) | 61.8±4.4 km/s |

Other designations
- 2MASS J00194992+2156521, AAVSO 0014+21

Database references
| SIMBAD | data |

QR Andromedae (often abbreviated to QR And) is an eclipsing binary star in the constellation Andromeda. Its maximum apparent visual magnitude is 12.16, but its light curve shows clearly eclipsing events where its brightness can drop to a magnitude of 13.07. This leads to its classification as an Algol variable star.

== Spectrum ==
The optical spectrum of QR Andromedae is not of a typical stellar blackbody, but is peculiar with many emission lines, the strongest being the He_{II} line. Balmer series and O_{VI} lines are also present. It was also one of the super soft X-ray sources discovered by ROSAT satellite, one of the few source of this kind observed so far in the Milky Way.

== System ==
It is now commonly accepted that super soft X-ray sources are white dwarfs that are burning matter with nuclear fusion on their surfaces, sustained by a high accretion rate of matter coming from a companion star. QR Andromedae is the nearest and brightest of those sources, and it has an orbital period of 15.85 hours. The companion star has a mass between 0.3 – 0.5 M_{☉} and should be a remnant of a more massive evolved star that is filling its Roche lobe.

== Variability ==
Photographic plates from the Harvard College and Sonneberg observatories have recorded QR Andromedae's brightness history since the late 19th century. Jochen Greiner and Wolfgang Wenzel constructed a 100 year light curve for the star. They found that the light curve exhibited brightness changes of up to one magnitude, on a variety of timescales. They proposed that this was the result of unstable mass transfers onto the white dwarf, triggering sporadic hydrogen burning.

Eclipses in the light curve of QR Andromedae are not symmetrical: the ingress is more gradual than the egress. The secondary minimum is variable in occurring phase and depth, meaning that the occultation of the secondary star happens behind a variable part of the disk. Out of the eclipses, light flickering can be clearly seen, and in some observations a periodicity arises.
