= M1-67 =

Nebula in the constellation Sagitta

Nebula
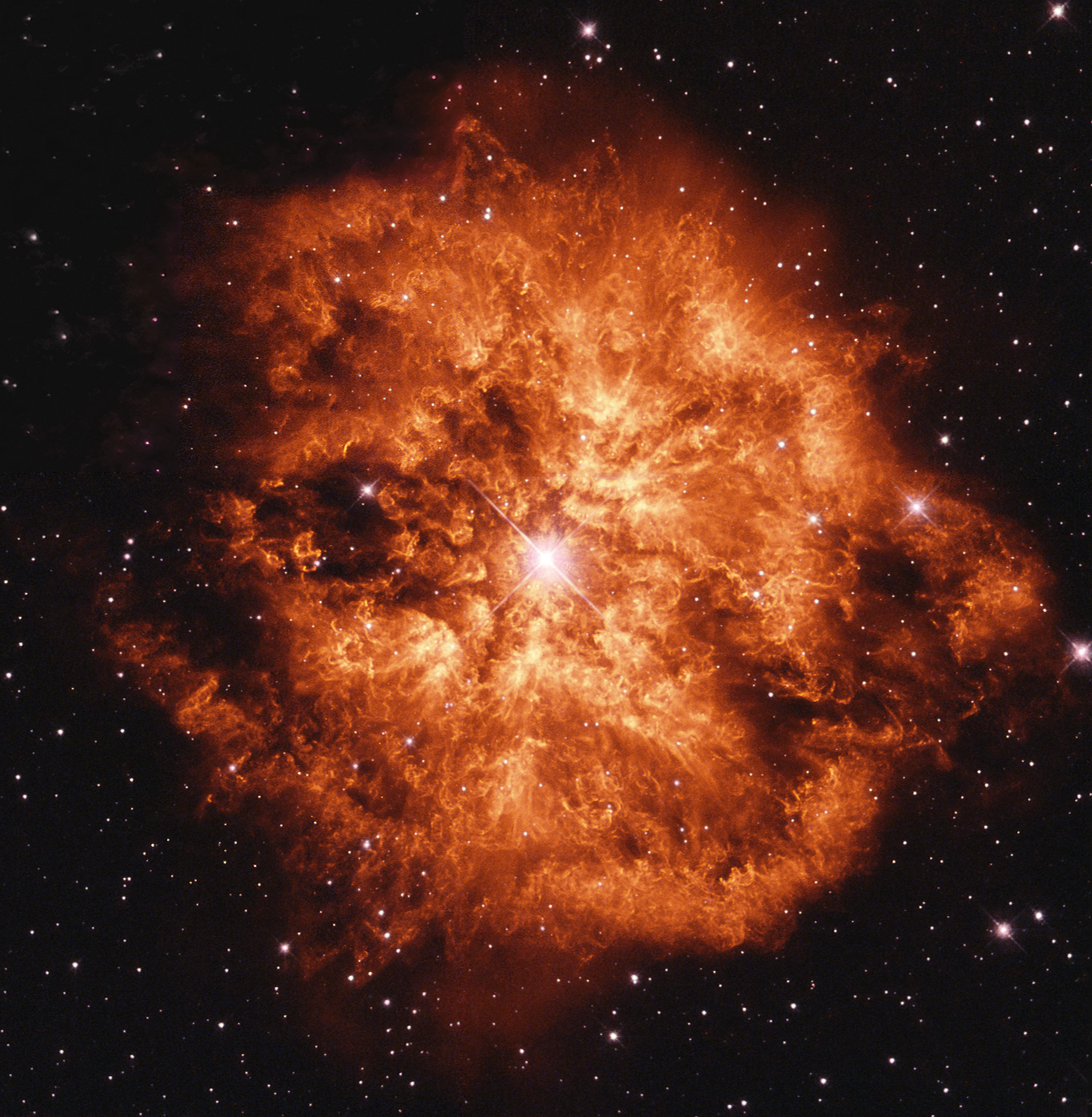
- The ejecta shell that was created 10,000 years ago. The star, WR 124, is visible in the center of the image.

Observation data: J2000.0 epoch
- Right ascension: 19^{h} 11^{m} 30.875^{s}
- Declination: +16° 51′ 38.199″
- Constellation: Sagitta

M1-67, also known as Merrill's Star Nebula, is an ejecta nebula that surrounds the Wolf–Rayet star WR 124, which is about 6.4 kpc from Earth in the constellation of Sagitta. It contains dust which is caught up in WR 124's solar wind and which absorbs much of the star's light. It was discovered by American astronomer Paul W. Merrill in 1938, at the same time that he discovered the star it surrounds. It is approximately 6 light years across, making it about 20,000 years old.

== Distance and characteristics ==
A 2010 study focused on M1-67, measuring its expansion rate by using Hubble Space Telescope photographs taken 11 years apart. The expansion rate was then compared to the expansion velocity, which was calculated from the Doppler shift of its nebular emission lines, resulting in a geometric distance of d=3.35 ± 0.67kpc. NASA has confirmed that the released gas is traveling at up to 100,000 mp/h, causing turbulence, and carrying along approximately 100 billion-mile wide glowing blobs, with each blob being around 30 times the mass of the Earth. The blast took place around 10,000 years or 10 millennia ago. An infrared study of the nebula showed that it consists of mildly processed material with number ratios of N/O = 1.0 ± 0.5 and C/O = 0.46 ± 0.27. The mass of the nebula's dust has been confirmed to be 0.22 M_{☉}, and the mass of its ionised gas is estimated at 9.2 M_{☉}.

The morphology of M1-67 is complex and knotted, unlike other Wolf–Rayet nebulae. Studying the dynamics of the nebula has suggested that it has interacted with the surrounding ISM, causing a bow shock which travels at a high velocity of about 180 km/s. WR 124 is determined to be about 1.3 parsecs away from the bow shock. The wind collided with the bow shock shortly after the outburst, oriented along its main axis, as evidenced by the lack of emission found within the radial velocities in the centre of the nebula as seen from telescopes on Earth. Higher radial velocities were found in the center and lower velocities near the edge, giving an estimated expansion rate of 150 km/s and dynamical timescales of 8 to 20 kyr. However, there are other explanations for its shape that do not require a bow shock. An alternative model suggest that WR 124 is a bipolar nebula with its axis in pointing northwest, surrounded by an equatorial torus, as well as jets expanding in the eastern direction.
