= Sagitta =

Constellation in the northern celestial hemisphere

- Constellation
- List of stars in Sagitta
- Abbreviation: Sge
- Genitive: Sagittae
- Pronunciation: /səˈdʒɪtə/ or /səˈɡɪtə/ Sagítta, genitive /səˈdʒɪtiː/
- Symbolism: the Arrow
- Right ascension: 18^{h} 57^{m} 21.3919^{s}–20^{h} 20^{m} 44.8677^{s}
- Declination: 16.0790844°–21.6436558°
- Area: 79.9 sq. deg. (86th)
- Main stars: 4
- Bayer/Flamsteed stars: 19
- Stars brighter than 3.00^{m}: 0
- Stars within 10.00 pc (32.62 ly): 2
- Brightest star: γ Sge (Telum) (3.51^{m})
- Nearest star: Gliese 745
- Messier objects: 1
- Bordering constellations: Vulpecula; Hercules; Aquila; Delphinus
- Visible at latitudes between +90° and −70°. Best visible at 21:00 (9 p.m.) during the month of August.

Sagitta is a dim but distinctive constellation in the northern sky. Its name is Latin for 'arrow', not to be confused with the significantly larger constellation Sagittarius 'the archer'. It was included among the 48 constellations listed by the 2nd-century astronomer Ptolemy, and it remains one of the 88 modern constellations defined by the International Astronomical Union. Although it dates to antiquity, Sagitta has no star brighter than 3rd magnitude and has the third-smallest area of any constellation.

Gamma Sagittae is the constellation's brightest star, with an apparent magnitude of 3.47. It is an aging red giant star 90% as massive as the Sun that has cooled and expanded to a radius 54 times greater than it. Delta, Epsilon, Zeta, and Theta Sagittae are each multiple stars whose components can be seen in small telescopes. V Sagittae is a cataclysmic variable—a binary star system composed of a white dwarf accreting mass of a donor star that is expected to go nova and briefly become the most luminous star in the Milky Way and one of the brightest stars in our sky around the year 2083. Two star systems in Sagitta are known to have Jupiter-like planets, while a third—15 Sagittae—has a brown dwarf companion.

== History ==
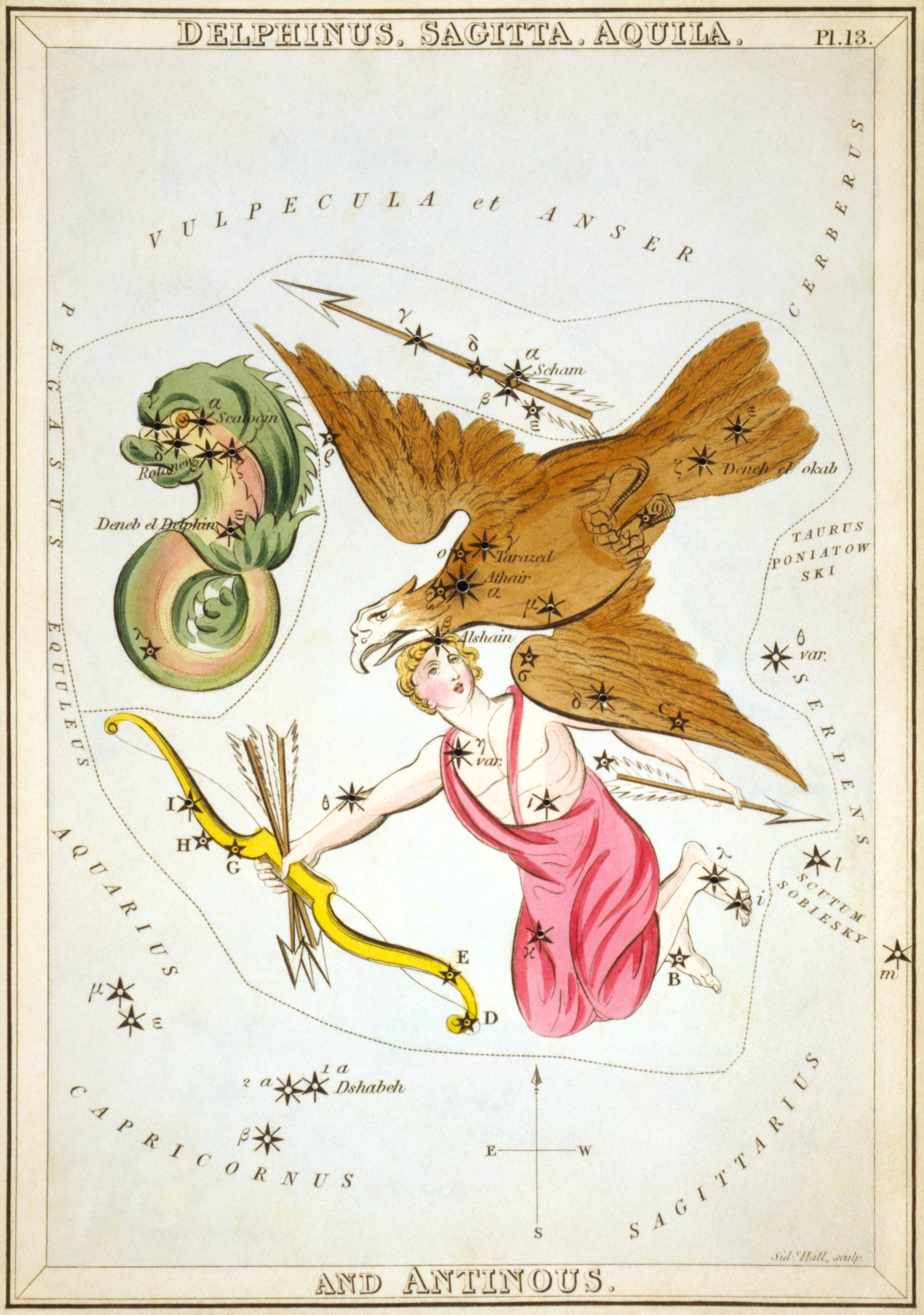
Sagitta can be seen above Aquila in this plate from Urania's Mirror (1825).

The ancient Greeks called Sagitta Oistos 'the arrow', and it was one of the 48 constellations described by Ptolemy. It was regarded as the weapon that Hercules used to kill the eagle (Aquila) of Jove that perpetually gnawed Prometheus' liver. Sagitta is located beyond the north border of Aquila, the Eagle. An amateur naturalist, polymath Richard Hinckley Allen proposed that the constellation could represent the arrow shot by Hercules towards the adjacent Stymphalian birds (which feature in Hercules' sixth labour) who had claws, beaks, and wings of iron, and who lived on human flesh in the marshes of Arcadia—denoted in the sky by the constellations Aquila the Eagle, Cygnus 'the Swan', and Lyra 'the Vulture'—and still lying between them, whence the title Herculea. Greek scholar Eratosthenes claimed it as the arrow with which Apollo exterminated the Cyclopes. The Romans named it Sagitta. In Arabic, it became al-sahm 'arrow', though this name became Sham and was transferred to Alpha Sagittae only. The Greek name has also been mistranslated as hó istos 'the loom' and thus in Arabic al-nawl. It was also called al-'anaza 'pike/javelin'.

== Characteristics ==
The four brightest stars make up an arrow-shaped asterism located due north of the bright star Altair. Covering 79.9 square degrees and hence 0.194% of the sky, Sagitta ranks 86th of the 88 modern constellations by area. Only Equuleus and Crux are smaller. Sagitta is most readily observed from the late spring to early autumn to northern hemisphere observers, with midnight culmination occurring on 17 July. Its position in the Northern Celestial Hemisphere means that the whole constellation is visible to observers north of 69°S. (Note: While parts of the constellation technically rise above the horizon to observers between the 69°S and 73°S, stars within a few degrees of the horizon are to all intents and purposes unobservable.) Sagitta is bordered by Vulpecula to the north, Hercules to the west, Aquila to the south, and Delphinus to the east. The three-letter abbreviation for the constellation, as adopted by the International Astronomical Union in 1922, is "Sge"; American astronomer Henry Norris Russell, who devised the code, had to resort to using the genitive form of the name to come up with a letter to include ('e') that was not in the name of the constellation Sagittarius. The official constellation boundaries, as set by Belgian astronomer Eugène Delporte in 1930, are defined by a polygon of twelve segments (illustrated in infobox). In the equatorial coordinate system, the right ascension coordinates of these borders lie between 18^{h} 57.2^{m} and 20^{h} 20.5^{m} , while the declination coordinates are between 16.08° and 21.64°.

== Features ==
=== Stars ===
Celestial cartographer Johann Bayer gave Bayer designations to eight stars, labelling them Alpha to Theta. English astronomer John Flamsteed added the letters x, mistaken as Chi (χ), y and z to 13, 14, and 15 Sagittae in his Catalogus Britannicus. All three were dropped by later astronomers John Bevis and Francis Baily.

==== Bright stars ====
Ptolemy saw the constellation's brightest star Gamma Sagittae as marking the arrow's head, while Bayer saw Gamma, Eta, and Theta as depicting the arrow's shaft. Gamma Sagittae is a red giant of spectral type M0 III, and magnitude 3.47. It lies at a distance of 258±4 light-years from Earth. With around 90% of the Sun's mass, it has a radius 54 times that of the Sun and is 575 times as bright. It is most likely on the red-giant branch of its evolutionary lifespan, having exhausted its core hydrogen and now burning it in a surrounding shell.

Delta Sagittae is the second-brightest star in the constellation and is a binary. Delta and Zeta depicted the spike according to Bayer. The Delta Sagittae system is composed of a red supergiant of spectral type M2 II that has 3.9 times the Sun's mass and 152 times its radius and a blue-white B9.5V main sequence star that is 2.9 times as massive as the Sun. The two orbit each other every ten years. Zeta Sagittae is a triple star system, approximately 326 light-years from Earth. The primary and secondary are A-type stars.

In his Uranometria, Bayer depicted Alpha, Beta, and Epsilon Sagittae as the fins of the arrow. Also known as Sham, Alpha is a yellow bright giant star of spectral class G1 II with an apparent magnitude of 4.38, which lies at a distance of 382±8 light-years from Earth. Four times as massive as the Sun, it has swollen and brightened to 21 times the Sun's radius and 340 times its luminosity. Also of magnitude 4.38, Beta is a G-type giant located 420±10 light-years distant from Earth. Estimated to be around 129 million years old, it is 4.33 times as massive as the Sun, and has expanded to roughly 27 times its radius. Epsilon Sagittae is a double star whose component stars can be seen in a small telescope. With an apparent magnitude of 5.77, the main star is a 331-million-year-old yellow giant of spectral type G8 III around 3.09 times as massive as the Sun, that has swollen to 18.37+0.65
−0.88 its radius. It is 580±10 light-years distant. The visual companion of magnitude 8.35 is 87.4 arcseconds distant, but is an unrelated blue supergiant around 7,000 light-years distant from Earth.

Eta Sagittae is an orange giant of spectral class K2 III with a magnitude of 5.09. Located 155.9±0.9 light-years from Earth, it has a 61.1% chance of being a member of the Hyades–Pleiades stream of stars that share a common motion through space. Theta Sagittae is a double star system, with components 12 arcseconds apart visible in a small telescope. At magnitude 6.5, the brighter is a yellow-white main sequence star of spectral type F3 V, located 146.1±0.2 light-years from Earth. The 8.8-magnitude fainter companion is a main sequence star of spectral type G5 V. A 7.4-magnitude orange giant of spectral type K2 III is also visible 91″ from the binary pair, located 842±9 light-years away.

==== Variable stars ====
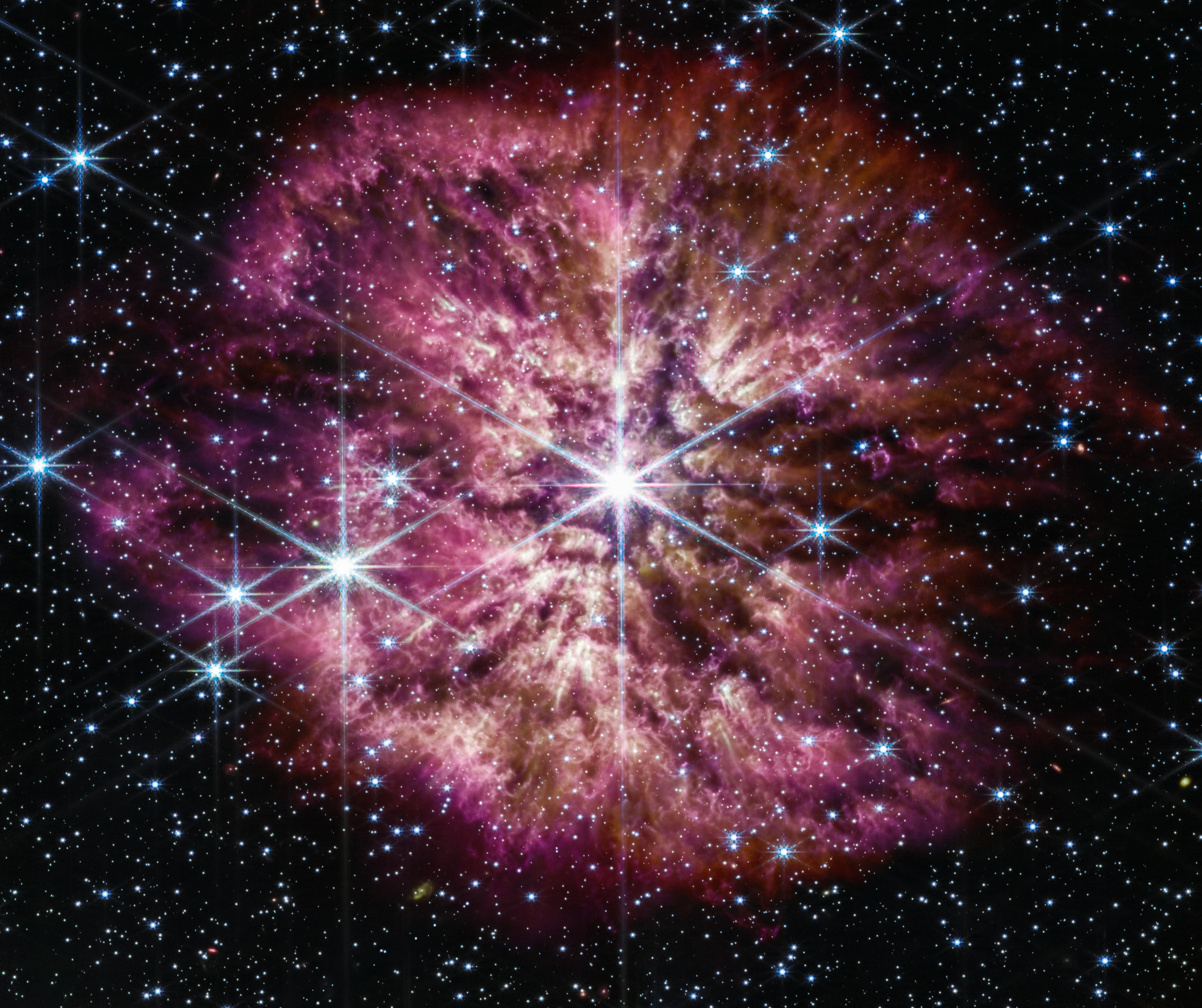
James Webb Space Telescope image of WR 124 in Sagitta. NIRCam and MIRI composite

Variable stars are popular targets for amateur astronomers, their observations providing valuable contributions to understanding star behaviour. R Sagittae is a member of the rare RV Tauri variable class of star. It ranges in magnitude from 8.2 to 10.4. It is around 8,100 light-years distant. It has a radius 61.2+12.4
−9.9 times that of the Sun, and is 2,329+744
−638 as luminous, yet most likely is less massive than the Sun. An aging star, it has moved on from the asymptotic giant branch of stellar evolution and is on its way to becoming a planetary nebula. FG Sagittae is a "born again" star, a highly luminous star around 4,000 light-years distant from Earth. It reignited fusion of a helium shell shortly before becoming a white dwarf, and has expanded first to a blue supergiant and then to a K-class supergiant in less than 100 years. It is surrounded by a faint (visual magnitude 23) planetary nebula, Henize 1–5, that formed when FG Sagittae first left the asymptotic giant branch.

S Sagittae is a classical Cepheid that varies from magnitude 5.24 to 6.04 every 8.38 days. It is a yellow-white supergiant that pulsates between spectral types F6 Ib and G5 Ib. Around 6 or 7 times as massive and 3,500 times as luminous as the Sun, it is located around 5,100 light-years from Earth. HD 183143 is a remote highly luminous star around 7,900 light-years away, that has been classified as a blue hypergiant. Infrared bands of ionised buckminsterfullerene molecules have also been found in its spectrum. WR 124 is a Wolf–Rayet star moving at great speed surrounded by a nebula of ejected gas.

U Sagittae is an eclipsing binary that varies between magnitudes 6.6 and 9.2 over 3.4 days, making it a suitable target for enthusiasts with small telescopes. There are two component stars—a blue-white star of spectral type B8 V and an ageing star that has cooled and expanded into a yellow subgiant of spectral type G4 III-IV. They orbit each other close enough that the cooler subgiant has filled its Roche lobe and is passing material to the hotter star, and hence it is a semidetached binary system. The system is 900±10 light-years distant. Near U Sagittae is X Sagittae, a semiregular variable ranging between magnitudes 7.9 and 8.4 over 196 days. A carbon star, X Sagittae has a surface temperature of 2,576 K.

Located near 18 Sagittae is V Sagittae, the prototype of the V Sagittae variables, cataclysmic variables that are also super soft X-ray sources. It is expected to become a luminous red nova when the two stars merge around the year 2083, and briefly become the most luminous star in the Milky Way and one of the brightest stars in Earth's sky. WZ Sagittae is another cataclysmic variable, composed of a white dwarf that has about 85% the mass of the Sun, and low-mass star companion that has been calculated to be a brown dwarf of spectral class L2 that is only 8% as massive as the Sun. Normally a faint object dimmer than magnitude 15, it flared up in 1913, 1946 and 1978 to be visible in binoculars. The Black Widow pulsar (B1957+20) is the second millisecond pulsar ever discovered. It is a massive neutron star that is ablating its brown dwarf-sized companion which causes the pulsar's radio signals to attenuate as they pass through the outflowing material.

==== Stars with exoplanets ====
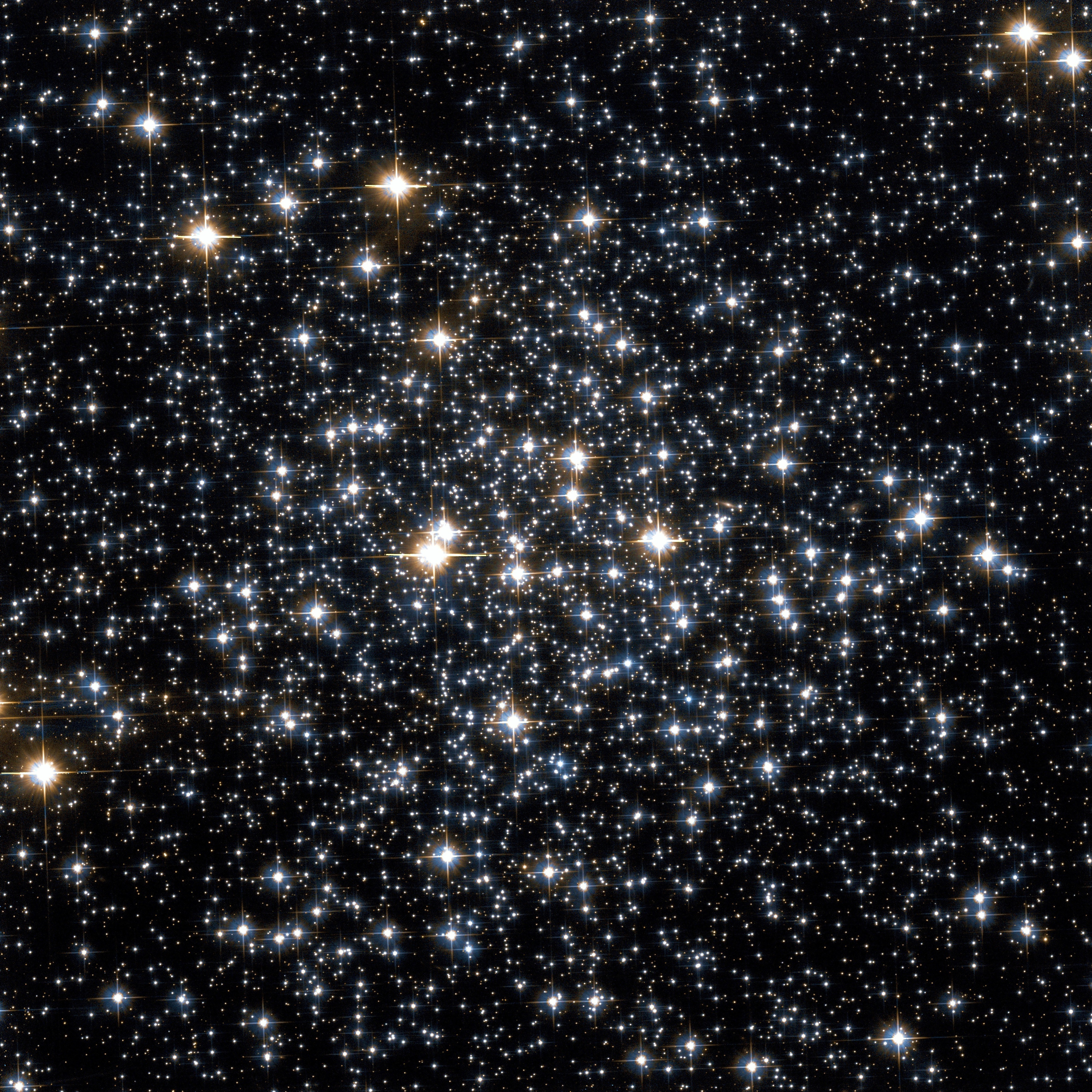
Messier 71 globular cluster

HD 231701 is a yellow-white main sequence star hotter and larger than the Sun, with a Jupiter-like planet that was discovered in 2007 by the radial velocity technique. The planet orbits at a distance of 0.57 AU from the star with a period of 141.6 days. It has a mass of at least 1.13 Jupiter masses.

HAT-P-34 is a star 1.392±0.047 times as massive as the Sun with 1.535+0.135
−0.102 times its radius and 3.63+0.75
−0.51 times its luminosity. With an apparent magnitude of 10.4, it is 819±9 light-years distant. A planet 3.328±0.211 times as massive as Jupiter was discovered transiting it in 2012. With a period of 5.45 days and a distance of 0.06 AU from its star, it has an estimated surface temperature of 1,520±60 K.

15 Sagittae is a solar analog—a star similar to the Sun, with 1.08±0.04 times its mass, 1.115±0.021 times its radius and 1.338±0.03 times its luminosity. It has an apparent magnitude of 5.80. It has an L4 brown dwarf substellar companion that is around the same size as Jupiter but 69 times as massive with a surface temperature of between 1,510 and 1,850 K, taking around 73.3 years to complete an orbit around the star. The system is estimated to be 2.5±1.8 billion years old.

=== Deep-sky objects ===
The band of the Milky Way and the Great Rift within it pass through Sagitta, with Alpha, Beta and Epsilon Sagittae marking the Rift's border. Located between Beta and Gamma Sagittae is Messier 71, a very loose globular cluster mistaken for some time for a dense open cluster. At a distance of about 13,000 light-years from Earth, it was first discovered by the French astronomer Philippe Loys de Chéseaux in the year 1745 or 1746. The loose globular cluster has a mass of around 53,000 M_{☉} and a luminosity of approximately 19,000 L_{☉}.

There are two notable planetary nebulae in Sagitta: NGC 6886 is composed of a hot central post-AGB star that has 55% of the Sun's mass yet 2,700±850 times its luminosity, with a surface temperature of 142,000 K, and surrounding nebula estimated to have been expanding for between 1,280 and 1,600 years, The nebula was discovered by Ralph Copeland in 1884. The Necklace Nebula—originally a close binary, one component of which swallowed the other as it expanded to become a giant star. The smaller star remained in orbit inside the larger, whose rotation speed increased greatly, resulting in it flinging its outer layers off into space, forming a ring with knots of bright gas formed from clumps of stellar material. It was discovered in 2005 and is around 2 light-years wide. It has a size of 0.35′. Both nebulae are around 15,000 light-years from Earth.

== See also ==
- Sagitta (Chinese astronomy)
