= Stellar mass loss =

Physical phenomenon of stars

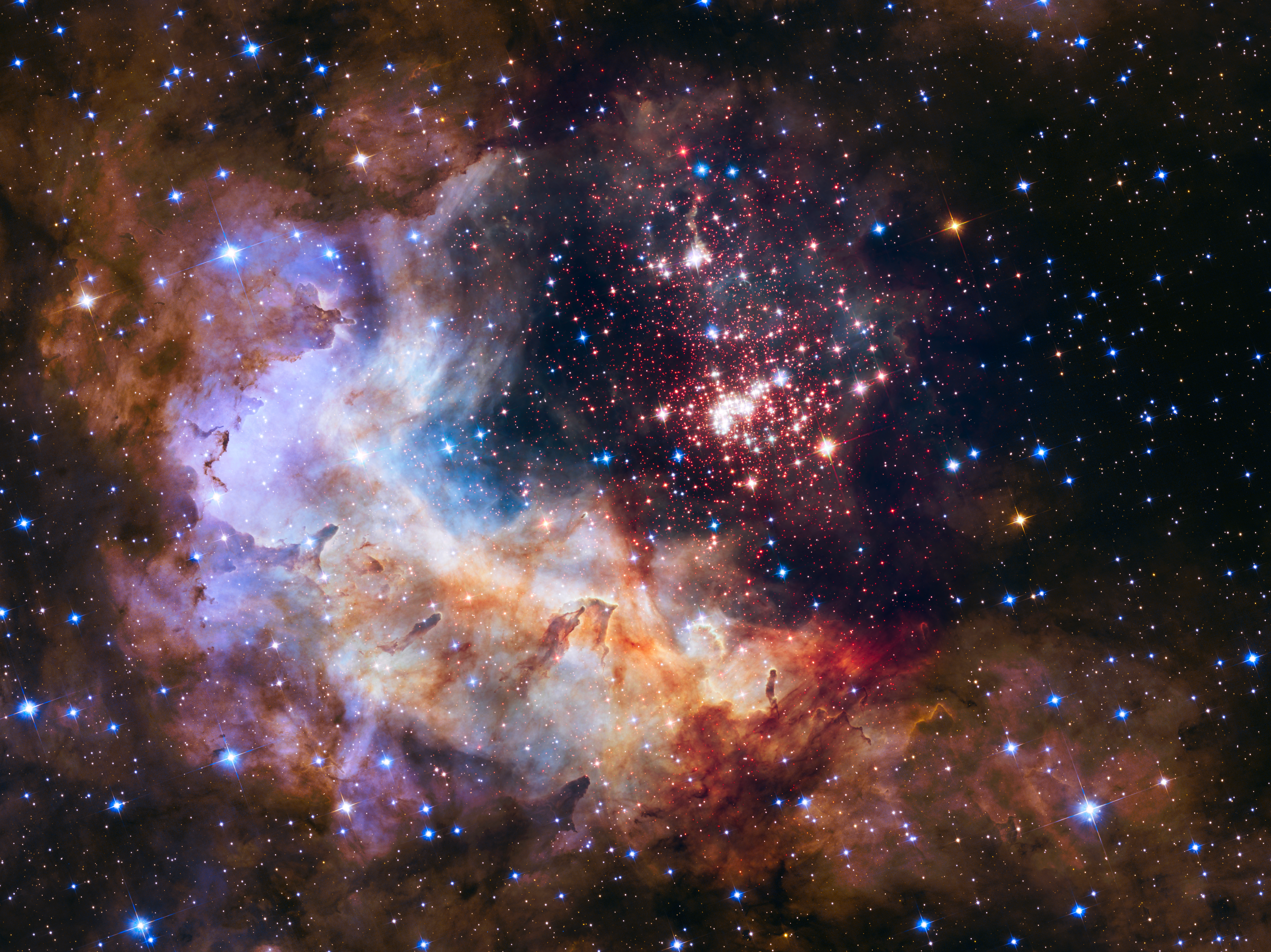
Stellar wind from a star cluster, Westerlund 2 pushes away surrounding gas and dust, creating shock waves that serve as the birthplace for new young stars. Image by the Hubble Space Telescope's Wide Field Camera 3.

Stellar mass loss is a phenomenon observed in stars by which stars lose some mass over their lives. Mass loss can be caused by triggering events that cause the sudden ejection of a large portion of the star's mass. It can also occur when a star gradually loses material to a binary companion or due to strong stellar winds. Massive stars are particularly susceptible to losing mass in the later stages of evolution. The amount and rate of mass loss varies widely based on numerous factors.

Stellar mass loss plays a very important role in stellar evolution, the composition of the interstellar medium, nucleosynthesis as well as understanding the populations of stars in clusters and galaxies.

== Causes ==
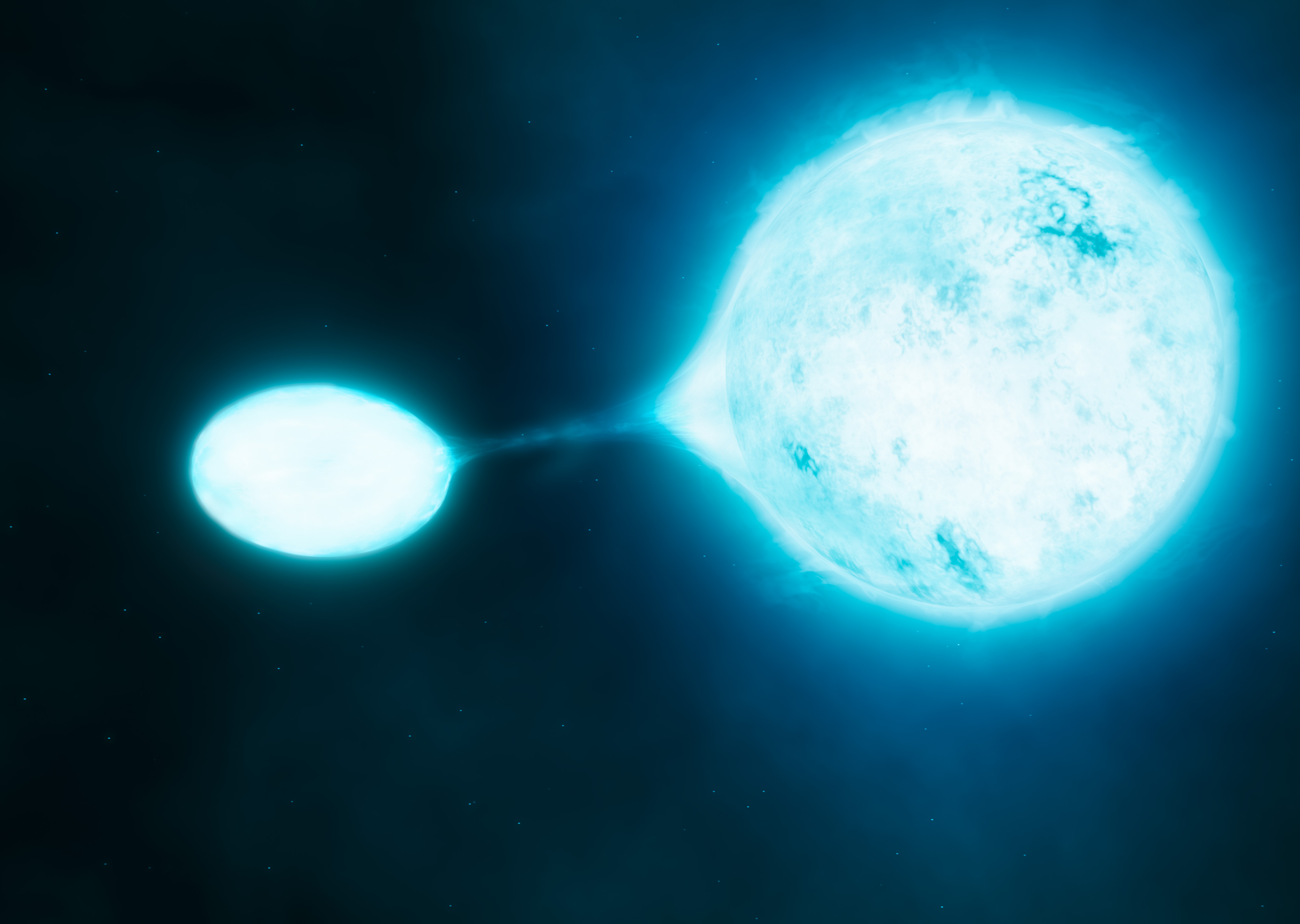
Artist's impression of a massive O-type star 'sucking' the mass of its companion in a binary system, living up to its nickname, 'vampire star'.

Every star undergoes some mass loss in its lifetime. This could be caused by its own stellar wind, or by interactions with the outside environment. Additionally, massive stars are particularly vulnerable to significant mass loss and can be influenced by a number of factors, including:

- Gravitational attraction of a binary companion
- Coronal mass ejection-type events
- Ascension to red giant or red supergiant status

Some of these causes are discussed below, along with the consequences of such phenomenon.

=== Solar wind ===
The solar wind is a stream of plasma released from the upper atmosphere of the Sun. The high temperatures of the corona allow charged particles and other atomic nuclei to gain the energy needed to escape the Sun's gravity. The Sun loses mass due to the solar wind at a very small rate, (2–3)×10^{−14} solar masses per year.

The solar wind carries trace amounts of the nuclei of heavy elements fused in the core of the Sun, revealing the inner workings of the Sun while also carrying information about the solar magnetic field. In 2021, the Parker Solar Probe measured 'sound speed' and magnetic properties of the solar wind plasma environment.

=== Binary Mass Transfer ===
Ripples in the density of the stellar wind of a massive star in a binary system before it goes supernova.

Often when a star is a member of a pair of close-orbiting binary stars, the tidal attraction of the gasses near the center of mass is sufficient to pull gas from one star onto its partner. This effect is especially prominent when the partner is a white dwarf, neutron star, or black hole. Mass loss in binary systems has particularly interesting outcomes. If the secondary star in the system overflows its Roche lobe, it loses mass to the primary, greatly altering their evolution. If the primary star is a white dwarf, the system rapidly develops into a Type-Ia supernova. Another alternate scenario for the same system is the formation of a cataclysmic variable or a 'Nova'. If the accreting star is a Neutron star or a Black hole, the resultant system is an X-ray binary.

A study in 2012 found that more than 70% of all massive stars exchange mass with a companion which leads to a binary merger in one-third of the cases. Since the trajectory of evolution of these stars is greatly altered due to the mass loss to the companion, models of stellar evolution are focusing on replicating these observations.

=== Mass ejection ===
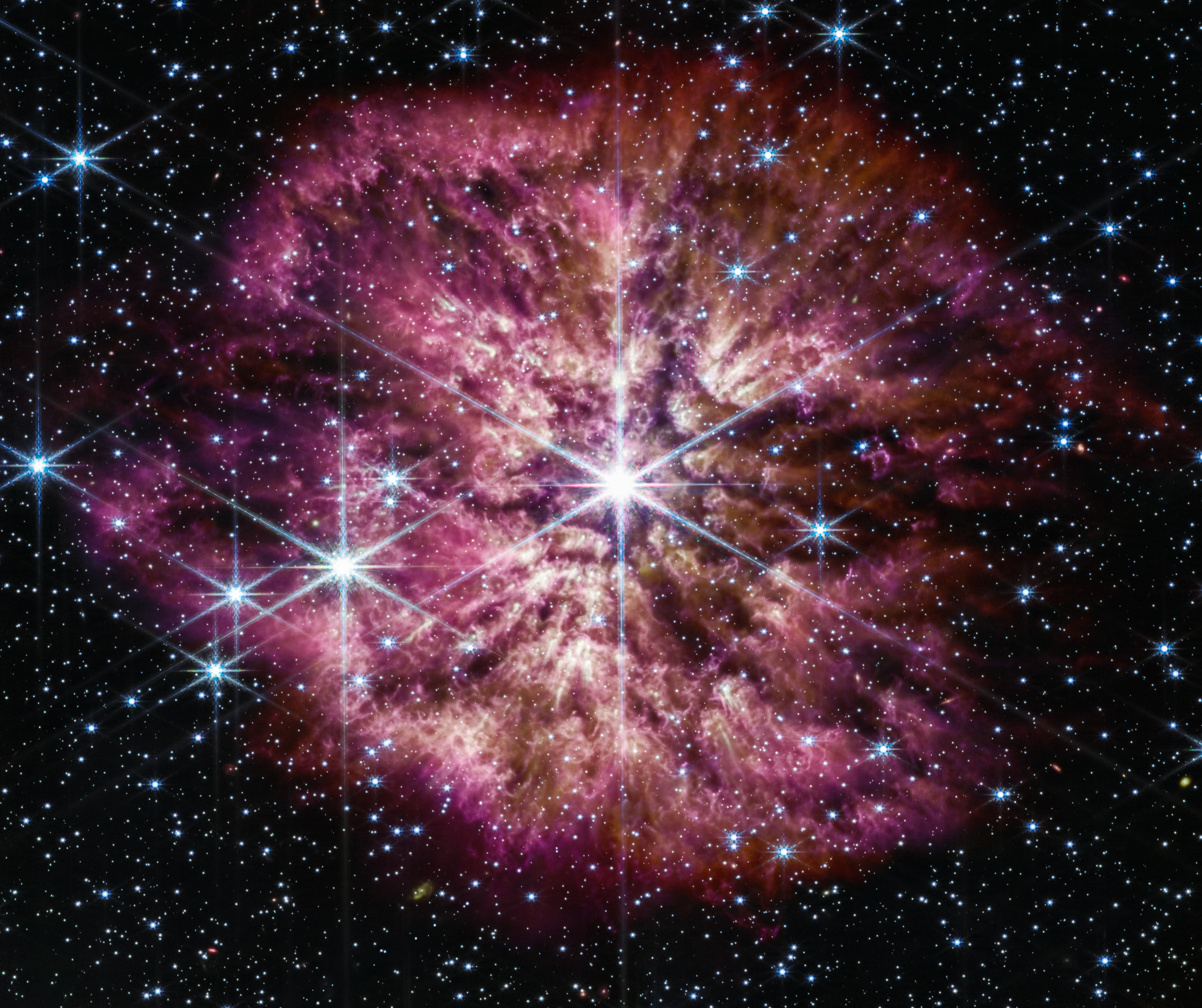
James Webb Space Telescope NIRCam and MIRI composite image of the Wolf–Rayet star WR 124 and its surrounding nebula. The star's mass loss history is encoded in the structure of the nebula. The lack of spherical symmetry in the nebular structure points to random, asymmetrical ejections. The clumps of dust and gas highlight the star's strong wind.

Certain classes of stars, especially Wolf-Rayet stars are sufficiently massive and as they evolve, their radius increases. This causes their hold on their upper layers to weaken allowing small disturbances to blast large amounts of the outer layers into space. Events such as solar flares and coronal mass ejections are mere blips on the mass loss scale for low mass stars (like the Sun). However, these same events cause catastrophic ejection of stellar material into space for massive stars like Wolf-Rayet stars.

Such stars are extremely charitable and spend much of their lives donating mass to the surrounding interstellar medium. As they are stripped of their hydrogen envelopes, they continue to be good samaritans, giving up heavier elements like helium, carbon, nitrogen and oxygen, with some of the most massive stars putting out even heavier elements up to aluminum.

=== Red giant mass loss ===
Stars which have entered the red giant phase are notorious for rapid mass loss. As above, the gravitational hold on the upper layers is weakened, and they may be shed into space by violent events such as the beginning of a helium flash in the core. The final stage of a red giant's life will also result in prodigious mass loss as the star loses its outer layers to form a planetary nebula.

The structures of these nebulae provide insight into the history of the mass loss of the star. Over-densities and under-densities reveal the periods where the star was actively losing mass while the distribution of these clumps in space hints at the physical cause of the loss. Uniform spherical shells in the nebula point towards symmetric stellar winds while asymmetry and lack of uniform structure point to mass ejections and stellar flares as the cause.

This phenomenon takes on a new scale when looking at AGB stars. Stars found on the Asymptotic giant branch of the Hertzsprung–Russell diagram are the most prone to mass loss in the later stages of their evolution compared to others. This phase is when the most mass is lost for a single star that does not go on to explode in a supernova.
