= NGC 6886 =

Planetary nebula in the constellation Sagitta

Emission nebula
- Planetary nebula
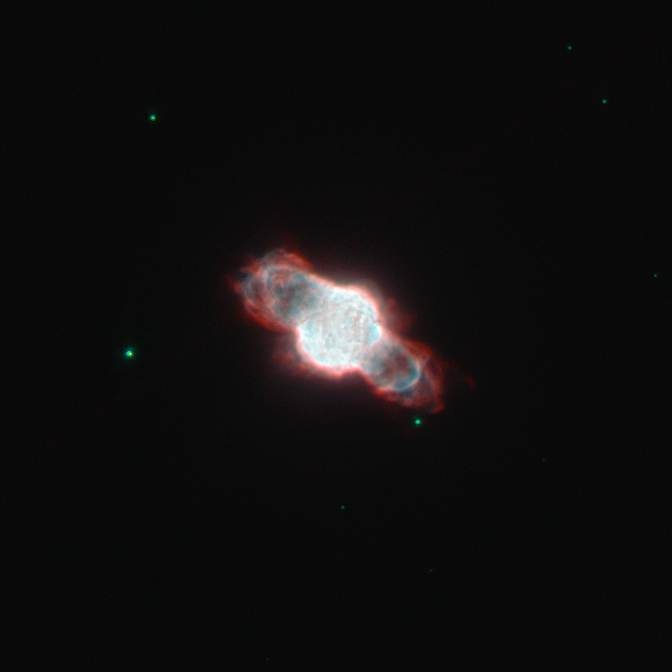
- An HST picture of nebula NGC 6886. Credit: ESA/Hubble

Observation data: J2000 epoch
- Right ascension: 20^{h} 12^{m} 42.83^{s}
- Declination: +19° 59′ 22.6″
- Distance: 4.6 ± 1.0 kiloparsec (15.0 ± 3.3 kly) ly
- Apparent magnitude (V): 11.8
- Constellation: Sagitta
- Designations: PK 060.1-07.7, Hen 2-458

NGC 6886 is a planetary nebula in the constellation Sagitta. It was discovered by Ralph Copeland on September 17, 1884. It is 4.6 ± 1.0 kiloparsec (15.0 ± 3.3 kly) distant from Earth, and is composed of a hot central post-AGB star that has 55% of the Sun's mass yet 2700 ± 850 its luminosity, with a surface temperature of 142,000 K. The planetary nebula is thought to have been expanding for between 1280 and 1600 years.
