= HD 231701 b =

Exoplanet that orbits HD 231701 in the constellation of Sagitta

HD 231701 b / Babylonia
Discovery
- Discovered by: Fischer et al.
- Discovery site: California, United States
- Discovery date: April 10, 2007
- Detection method: Radial velocity

Orbital characteristics
- Semi-major axis: 0.567±0.053 AU
- Eccentricity: 0.13±0.032
- Orbital period (sidereal): 141.63±0.067 d
- Time of periastron: 2,463,330.6±5.3
- Argument of periastron: 68±14
- Semi-amplitude: 39.2±1.2
- Star: HD 231701

HD 231701 b is an extrasolar planet approximately 356 light-years away in the constellation of Sagitta. This planet orbits at 0.55 AU from the star HD 231701 with eccentricity 0.19. Based on its high mass of 1.08 M_{J}, the planet is probably a gas giant, meaning the planet has no solid surface and have composition similar to Solar System's outer planets.

The planet HD 231701 b is named Babylonia. The name was selected in the NameExoWorlds campaign by Iraq, during the 100th anniversary of the IAU. Babylonia was a key kingdom in ancient Mesopotamia from the 18th to 6th centuries BC.
