= V Sagittae =

Variable star in the constellation Sagitta

- Location of V Sagittae (circled) in Sagitta

Observation data Epoch J2000 Equinox ICRS
- Constellation: Sagitta
- Right ascension: 20^{h} 20^{m} 14.691^{s}
- Declination: +21° 06′ 10.44″
- Apparent magnitude (V): 8.6-13.9

Characteristics
- Evolutionary stage: White dwarf (primary)
- Spectral type: Be
- Variable type: eclipsing and cataclysmic

Astrometry
Proper motion (μ)	RA: −2.133 mas/yr Dec.: −6.489 mas/yr
Parallax (π)	0.3310±0.0206 mas
Distance	9,900 ± 600 ly (3,000 ± 200 pc)
Absolute magnitude (M_{V})	−2.2

Orbit
Period (P)	12.34 hours
Semi-major axis (a)	4.36 R_{☉}
Inclination (i)	65–80°
Semi-amplitude (K_{1}) (primary)	320 km/s
Semi-amplitude (K_{2}) (secondary)	85 km/s

Details

White dwarf (primary)
Mass	1.0 M_{☉}

Donor (secondary)
Mass	0.8–1.0 M_{☉}

Other designations
- AAVSO 1015+20, V Sge, GSC 01643-01764

Database references
SIMBAD	data

V Sagittae or V Sge is a cataclysmic variable in the constellation Sagitta. It is the only super soft X-ray source non-magnetic cataclysmic variable found so far. Lidiya Tseraskaya discovered the variability of this star, in 1902. It appeared with its variable star designation in Annie Jump Cannon's 1907 work Second catalogue of variable stars.

== Characteristics ==
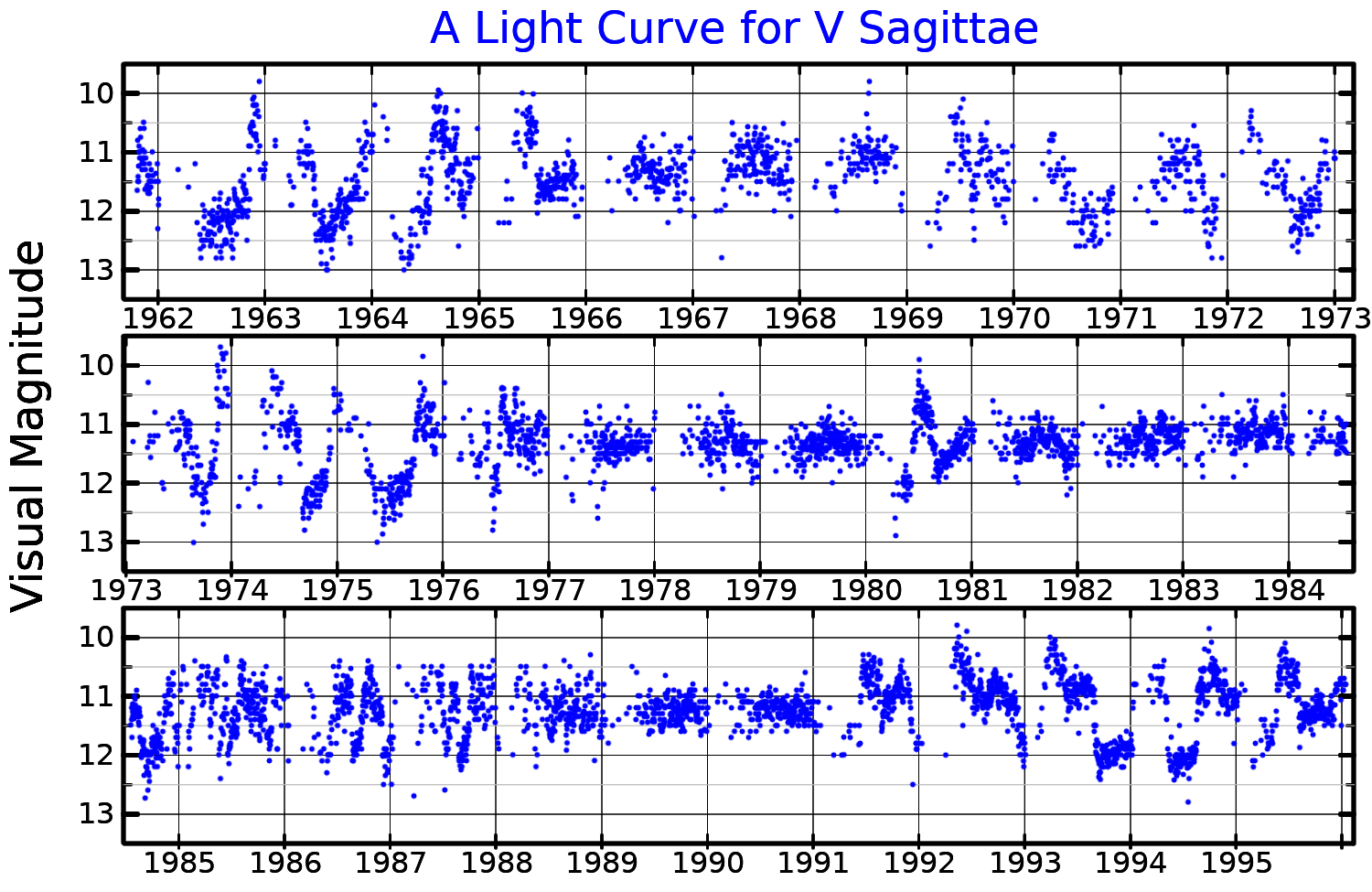
A visual band light curve for V Sagittae, adapted from Šimon and Mattei (1999)

There are two models that have been proposed to explain V Sagittae's properties. One says that the system is composed of a white dwarf accreting mass from a companion via an accretion disk, while the other model says that the system is composed of two hot stars (nearly) forming a contact binary. Both models have been disputed. Smak (2022) notes that the primary component shows similarities with Wolf-Rayet stars and the model with a white dwarf and its accretion disk does not explain many aspects of the system, including orbital period variations and mass loss from the primary, supporting a configuration with a Wolf-Rayet star and a main sequence star. However, a 2025 study by Hakala, Charles and Rodríguez-Gil found that the 'hot binary' model fails to explain multiple properties of V Sagittae, such as the system's variability, strong Hα emission and presence of stationary, double-peaked narrow emission lines, while the white dwarf model explains nearly all of them.

Material from the donor is accreting onto the primary at an exponentially increasing rate, generating a huge stellar wind. The doubling time for the accretion rate, and hence for the system luminosity, is about 89±11 years. It is predicted that the system will erupt as a nova some time between 2067 and 2099, at which point it will become one of the brightest stars in the sky.
