= S Sagittae =

Variable star in the constellation Sagitta

- Location of S Sagittae (circled)

Observation data Epoch J2000 Equinox J2000
- Constellation: Sagitta
- Right ascension: 19^{h} 56^{m} 01.26^{s}
- Declination: +16° 38′ 05.3″
- Apparent magnitude (V): 5.24 – 6.04

Characteristics
- Evolutionary stage: Supergiant
- Spectral type: F6Ib-G5Ib
- U−B color index: +0.6 – +0.9
- B−V color index: +0.7 – +1.0
- Variable type: Classical Cepheid

Astrometry
Radial velocity (R_{v})	−9.91 km/s
Proper motion (μ)	RA: +0.375 mas/yr Dec.: −7.100 mas/yr
Parallax (π)	1.6673±0.1106 mas
Distance	2,000 ± 100 ly (600 ± 40 pc)
Absolute magnitude (M_{V})	−3.8

Details
Mass	7 M_{☉}
Radius	58.5 R_{☉}
Luminosity	5,200 L_{☉}
Surface gravity (log g)	1.93 cgs
Temperature	5,400 K
Metallicity [Fe/H]	+0.1 dex
Age	81 Myr

Other designations
- 10 Sge, BD+16°4067, HD 188727, HIP 98085, HR 7609, SAO 105436

Database references
SIMBAD	data

S Sagittae, also known by the Flamsteed designation of 10 Sagittae, a Classical Cepheid variable in the constellation Sagitta that varies from magnitude 5.24 to 6.04 in 8.382 days. It is faintly visible to the naked eye of an observer far from city lights. Its variable star designation of "S" indicates that it was the second star discovered to be variable in the constellation. Irish amateur astronomer John Ellard Gore was the first to observe its variability in 1885, and Ralph Hamilton Curtiss discovered its changing radial velocity in 1903–04. Harlow Shapley observed in 1916 that the spectrum of it and other Cepheids varied with its brightness, recording it as spectral type F0 leading to maximum, F4 at maximum, and G3 just before minimum brightness.

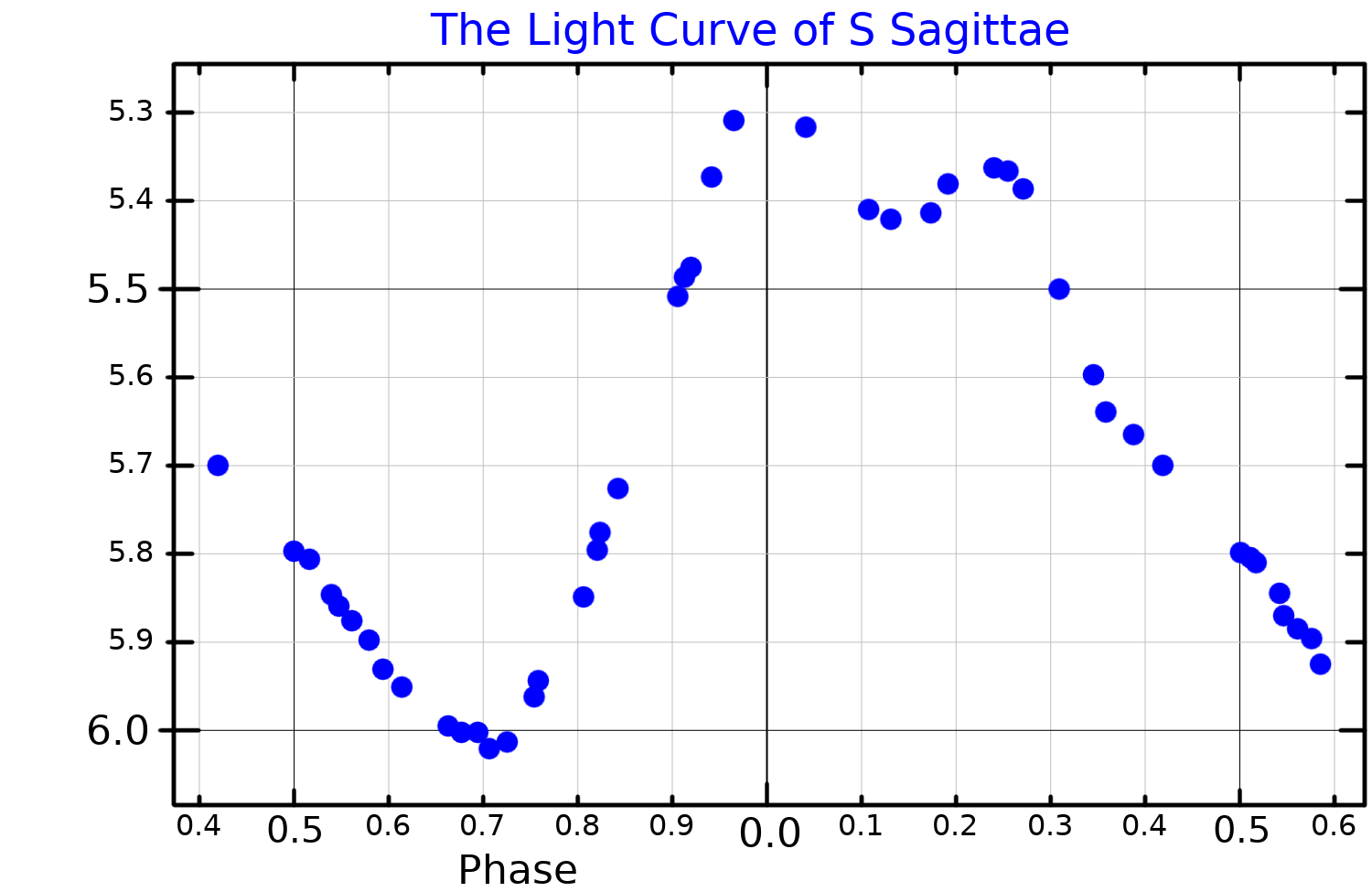
A visual band light curve for S Sagittae, adapted from Kiss (1998)

S Sagittae is a yellow-white supergiant that varies between spectral types F6Ib and G5Ib. It is around six or seven times as massive and five thousand times as luminous as the Sun and is located around 2,000 light-years away from Earth. Its radius is 58.5 times that of the Sun. The radius, temperature, luminosity, and colour are all variable as the star pulsates during its eight-day period. The period is slowly increasing.

S Sagittae has been reported as a double or triple system with a hotter main sequence star companion in a 676-day orbit. The companion, and its own possible fainter companion, are only detectable from radial velocity changes in the spectral lines of the Cepheid primary and an ultraviolet excess. Analysis of the spectrum indicates a star of spectral type A7V to F0V, and 1.5 to 1.7 times as massive as the Sun. However, as the mass of the companion is greater than 2.8 solar masses, this strongly suggests this companion is itself a binary star.
