= HD 183143 =

Star in the constellation Sagitta

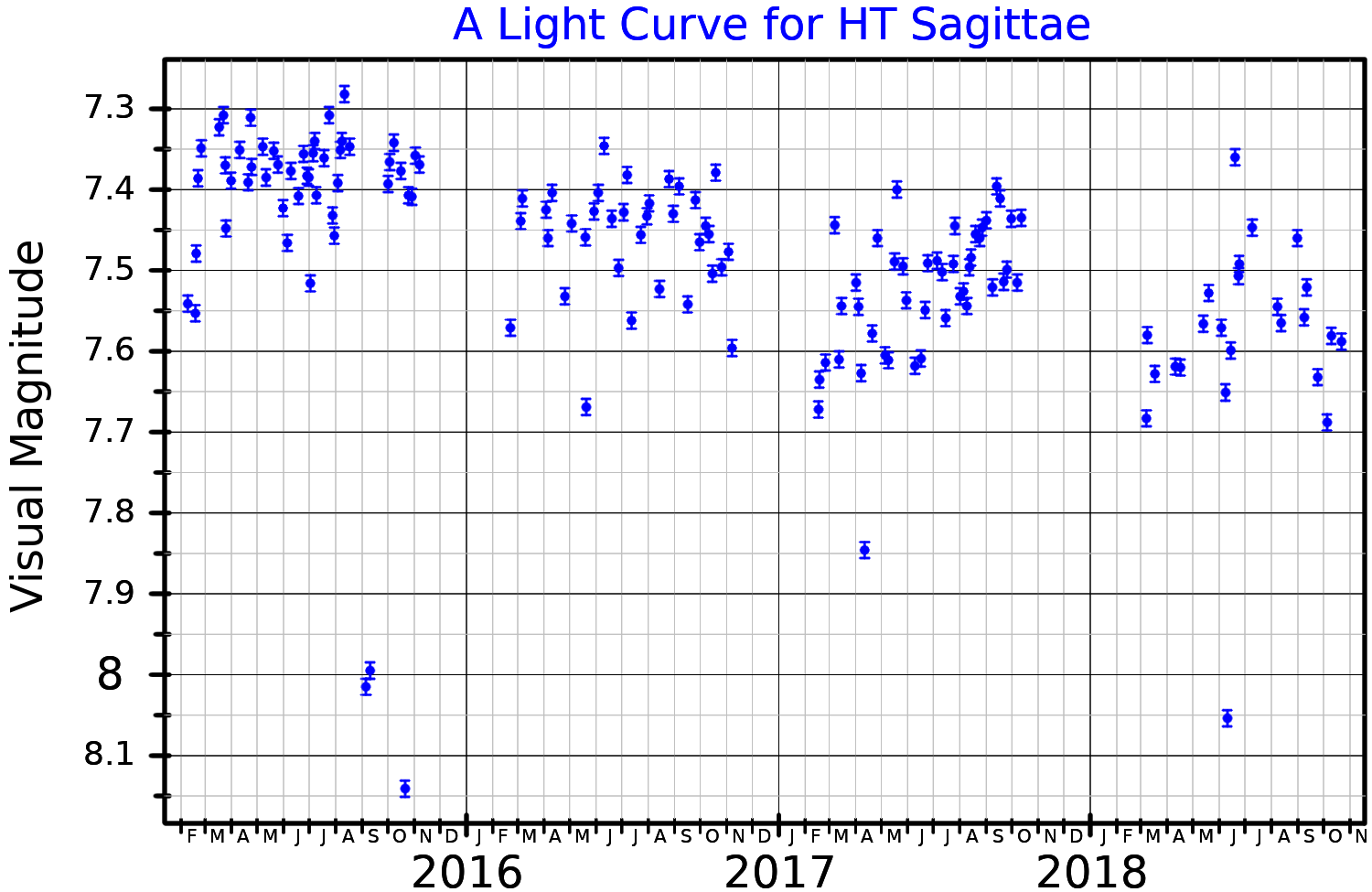
- A visual band light curve for HT Sagittae, plotted from ASAS-SN data

Observation data Epoch J2000.0 Equinox J2000.0
- Constellation: Sagitta
- Right ascension: 19^{h} 27^{m} 26.5636^{s}
- Declination: +18° 17′ 45.193″
- Apparent magnitude (V): 6.71 - 6.95

Characteristics
- Spectral type: B6-8 Ia-0
- Apparent magnitude (B): 8.08
- Apparent magnitude (J): 4.13
- Apparent magnitude (K): 3.46
- U−B color index: +0.2
- B−V color index: +1.2
- Variable type: α Cyg?

Astrometry
Proper motion (μ)	RA: −1.004 mas/yr Dec.: −5.703 mas/yr
Parallax (π)	0.4296±0.0243 mas
Distance	4,990±550 ly (1530±170 pc)
Absolute magnitude (M_{V})	−8.7

Details
Mass	24.2±1.4 M_{☉}
Radius	109±15 R_{☉}
Luminosity	288,000+83,000 −65,000 L_{☉}
Surface gravity (log g)	1.76±0.05 cgs
Temperature	12,800±200 K
Rotational velocity (v sin i)	37±5 km/s
Age	7.59+0.54 −0.51 Myr

Other designations
- HT Sge, BD+18°4085, HD 183143, HIP 95657, SAO 104860

Database references
SIMBAD	data

HD 183143 (HT Sagittae) is a blue hypergiant star located in the constellation of Sagitta.

This star has an apparent magnitude of 6.9, meaning that cannot be seen with the naked eye, but is an easy target for binoculars or a small telescope.

== Observations ==
HD 183143 was included in the first catalogue of Be stars, with distinct H_{α} emission lines. When emission lines in hot supergiant stars were investigated as indicators of expanding atmospheres and mass loss, HD 183143 was found to have H_{α} lines with P Cygni profiles, but indications of only modest mass loss. Modern high-resolution spectra show emission in lines from H_{α}, H_{β}, H_{γ}, and H_{δ}, formed by the strong stellar wind.

The introduction of spectral standards for supergiants gave HD 183143 as the standard star for the class B7Ia. The spectral type is sometimes given as B7Iae to indicate the presence of the emission lines.

HD 183143 was listed as being variable in 1976, with a very small amplitude. During the Hipparcos mission, its brightness was observed to vary between magnitude 6.71 and 6.95. ASAS-3 photometry shows a period of 40.44 days. HD 183143 was formally announced as a variable star, probably of the α Cygni type, in 1979 and given the variable star designation HT Sagittae.

HD 183143 has been extensively studied because of the diffuse interstellar bands visible in its spectrum. The strongest lines are caused by interstellar atomic iron, potassium, lithium, sodium, and calcium, as well as ionised calcium, and CH and CN molecules. Infrared bands of ionised buckminsterfullerene have also been found in its spectrum. HD 183143 has been proposed as a reference standard for interstellar polarisation. It shows 6% polarisation.

A 2004 study reclassified the spectral type of HD 183143 as B6-8 Ia-0, a hypergiant. The parallax from the original Hipparcos catalogue was 2.70 mas, indicating a distance around 370 pc, but the revised Hipparcos parallax and the Gaia Data Release 3 parallax both indicate distances around 2,000 pc. Comparison of the space velocity and interstellar spectral lines produce a similar distance, with the star lying between the Orion-Cygnus Arm and the Carina–Sagittarius Arm. At that distance, HD 183143 is an extremely luminous star, around 288,000 L_{☉}, with correspondingly high mass and radius.

== See also ==
- Zeta^{1} Scorpii
- Cygnus OB2#12
- Rigel
