= HD 231701 =

Star in the constellation Sagitta

HD 231701 / Uruk
Observation data Epoch J2000 Equinox ICRS
- Constellation: Sagitta
- Right ascension: 19^{h} 32^{m} 04.16092^{s}
- Declination: +16° 28′ 27.4431″
- Apparent magnitude (V): 8.97

Characteristics
- Evolutionary stage: main sequence
- Spectral type: F8 V
- B−V color index: 0.539±0.015

Astrometry
Radial velocity (R_{v})	−63.32±0.16 km/s
Proper motion (μ)	RA: 63.452 mas/yr Dec.: 15.508 mas/yr
Parallax (π)	9.2189±0.0160 mas
Distance	353.8 ± 0.6 ly (108.5 ± 0.2 pc)
Absolute magnitude (M_{V})	3.64

Details
Mass	1.23±0.10 M_{☉}
Radius	1.45+0.01 −0.04 R_{☉}
Luminosity	2.572±0.016 L_{☉}
Surface gravity (log g)	4.37±0.03 cgs
Temperature	6,081+72 −24 K
Metallicity [Fe/H]	0.04±0.02 dex
Rotational velocity (v sin i)	4.26 km/s
Age	3.22±1.99 or 4.5 Gyr

Other designations
- Uruk, BD+16°3883, HD 231701, HIP 96078, SAO 104946

Database references
SIMBAD	data
Exoplanet Archive	data

HD 231701 is a yellow-white hued star in the northern constellation of Sagitta, near the southern constellation border with Aquila. With an apparent visual magnitude of 8.97, it is too dim to be viewed with the naked eye, but can be seen with powerful binoculars or a small telescope. Parallax measurements provide a distance estimate of approximately 354 light-years from the Sun, but it is drifting closer with a radial velocity of −63 km/s. It is predicted to come as close as 189.5 light-years in 1.345 million years.

HD 231701 is named Uruk. The name was selected in the NameExoWorlds campaign by Iraq, during the 100th anniversary of the IAU. Uruk was an ancient city of the Sumer and Babylonian civilizations in Mesopotamia.

This object is an ordinary F-type main-sequence star with a stellar classification of F8 V. It is around three to 4.5 billion years old and may be evolving onto the subgiant branch. It is spinning with a projected rotational velocity of 4 km/s and has low chromospheric activity. HD 231701 has 1.2 times the mass of the Sun and 1.45 times the Sun's radius. It is radiating 2.6 times the luminosity of the Sun from its photosphere at an effective temperature of 6,081 K.

In 2007, the N2K Consortium used the radial velocity technique to discover a Jupiter-like planet orbiting at a distance of 0.57 AU from the star with a period of 141.6 days.

The HD 231701 planetary system
Companion (in order from star)	Mass	Semimajor axis (AU)	Orbital period (days)	Eccentricity	Inclination (°)	Radius
b / Babylonia	≥1.13±0.25 M_{J}	0.567±0.053	141.63±0.067	0.13±0.032	—	—

== See also ==
- List of extrasolar planets
