= X Sagittae =

The Bayer designation x Sagittae and the variable star designation X Sagittae are distinct. Due to technical limitations, both designations link here. For the star

- X Sagittae, a Mira variable
- x Sagittae, (sometimes mistaken as Chi Sagittae), a designation by John Flamsteed.
