= U Sagittae =

Eclipsing stellar binary

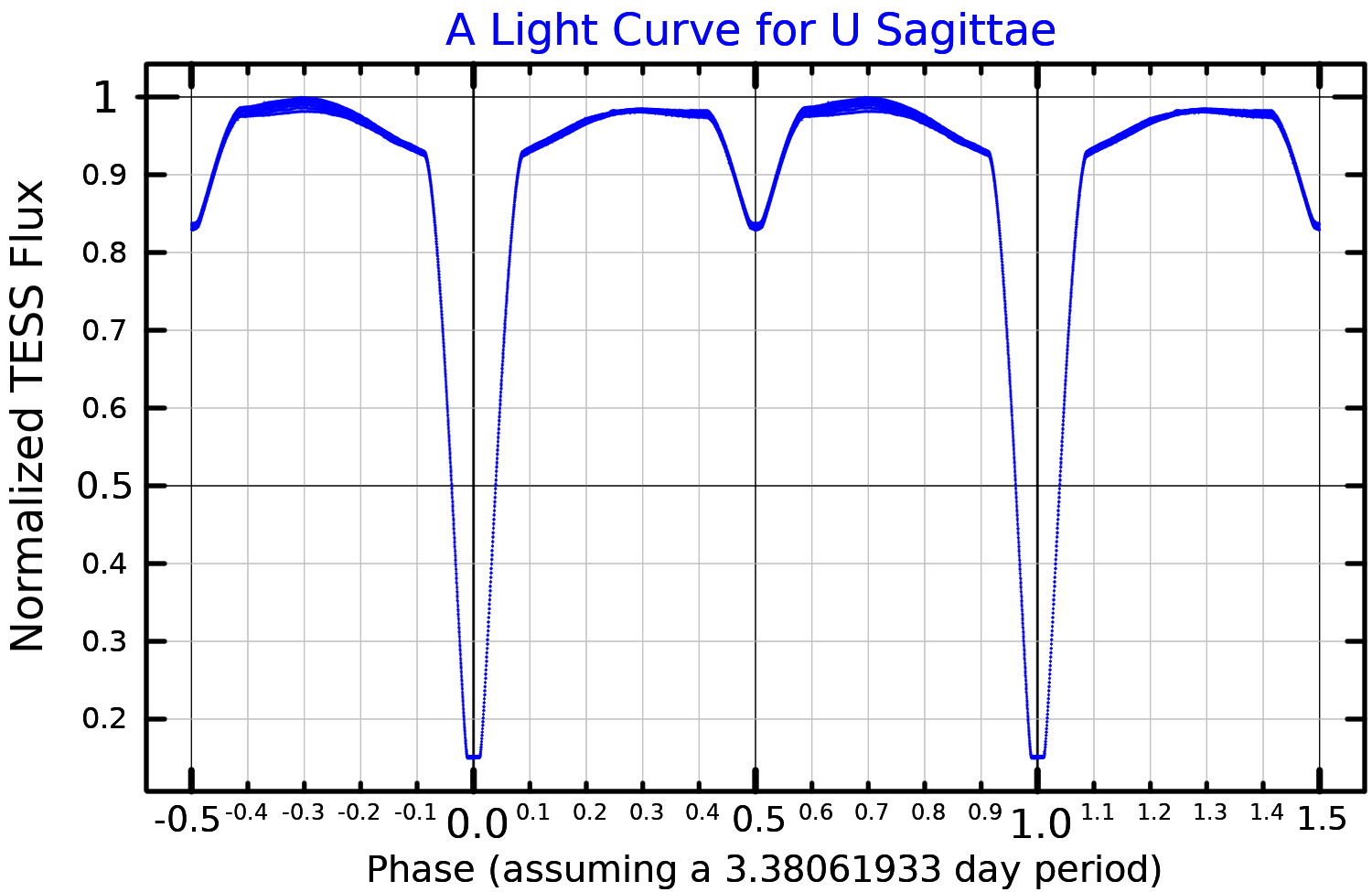
- A light curve for U Sagittae, plotted from TESS data

Observation data Epoch J2000.0 Equinox ICRS
- Constellation: Sagitta
- Right ascension: 19^{h} 18^{m} 48.408^{s}
- Declination: +19° 36′ 37.72″
- Apparent magnitude (V): 6.50

Characteristics
- Spectral type: B7.5 IV/V + G2 III/IV; B7.5 V + G4 III–IV
- B−V color index: −0.006±0.006
- Variable type: β Per

Astrometry
Radial velocity (R_{v})	−17.1±0.9 km/s
Proper motion (μ)	RA: +0.146 mas/yr Dec.: +1.076 mas/yr
Parallax (π)	3.7591±0.0284 mas
Distance	868 ± 7 ly (266 ± 2 pc)
Absolute magnitude (M_{V})	−0.36

Orbit
Period (P)	3.3806184 d
Semi-major axis (a)	≥ 0.0217 AU (3.24 Gm)
Eccentricity (e)	0.030±0.008
Argument of periastron (ω) (secondary)	194.4±14.1°
Semi-amplitude (K_{1}) (primary)	69.69±0.59 km/s

Details

Primary
Mass	4.629±0.061 M_{☉}
Radius	3.9193±0.029 R_{☉}
Surface gravity (log g)	3.9 cgs
Temperature	13,300 K
Rotational velocity (v sin i)	100 km/s

Secondary
Mass	1.731±0.204 M_{☉}
Radius	5.4772±0.027 R_{☉}
Luminosity	2.655±0.062 L_{☉}
Surface gravity (log g)	3.27 cgs
Temperature	5,500 K

Other designations
- AG 432, U Sge, BD+19°3975, GC 26639, HD 181182, HIP 94910, HR 7326, SAO 104711, WDS J19188+1937

Database references
SIMBAD	data

U Sagittae is an eclipsing binary star system in the northern constellation of Sagitta. It has been actively studied since its discovery in 1901. The maximum apparent visual magnitude of this system is 6.50, which is near the lower limit of visibility to the naked eye. The system is located at a distance of approximately 868 light years from the Sun based on parallax measurements, but is drifting closer with a radial velocity of −17 km/s. It is positioned about 2° from the middle of the Collinder 399 asterism, but lies much further away than the purported member stars.

The variable nature of this system was discovered by German astronomer Friedrich Schwab in 1901. He determined it to be an Algol variable with a brightness that decreased by 2.1 magnitudes during an eclipse. A single-lined spectroscopic orbit was published in 1916 by Mary Fowler using spectrograms taken from the Allegheny Observatory. With a larger set of observations, D. H. McNamara published a revised orbit in 1951. In 1959, hydrogen lines from the system were found to show a systematically different radial velocity compared to other lines from the two stars.

This is a spectroscopic binary system in a near circular orbit with a period of 3.38 days. It is a semidetached binary and the brightest fully eclipsing Algol variable. During the primary eclipse the brightness of the system drops to magnitude 9.28, while the secondary eclipse lowers the magnitude to 6.71. Observations of the system minima over a period of more than 80 years do not indicate a significant change in the orbital period. The orbital plane is inclined at an angle of 89° to the line of sight from the Earth, so it is being viewed from edge-on. The system contains circumstellar gas with a temperature of ~10^{4} K that is streaming between the stars. This forms an intermittent accretion disk around the primary.

The primary component is a B-type main-sequence star with a stellar classification of B7.5V. It has 4.6 times the mass and 3.9 times the radius of the Sun. The star is rotating with a projected rotational velocity of 100 km/s. It is radiating 48 times the luminosity of the Sun from its photosphere at an effective temperature of 13,300 K. The gas stream from the secondary is causing an increase in ultraviolet emission from this star from an impact hot spot.

The secondary has a class of G4 III–IV, indicating it is the more evolved member of the pair. It was originally the primary component of the system before expanding and transferring much of its mass to the present day primary. The secondary has filled its Roche lobe and is shedding mass at an estimated rate of 6.15×10^{−7} M_{☉}·yr^{−1}. It has 1.7 times the mass of the Sun and 5.5 times the Sun's radius. This star is rotating slightly faster than synchronous with the orbit, showing a projected rotational velocity of 73 km/s. It is radiating 2.7 times the luminosity of the Sun from its photosphere at an effective temperature of 5,500 K.
