= Eta Sagittae =

Star in the constellation Sagitta

η Sagittae
- Location of η Sagittae (circled)

Observation data Epoch J2000 Equinox ICRS
- Constellation: Sagitta
- Right ascension: 20^{h} 05^{m} 09.49303^{s}
- Declination: +19° 59′ 27.8575″
- Apparent magnitude (V): +5.09

Characteristics
- Evolutionary stage: red clump
- Spectral type: K2 III
- U−B color index: +0.98
- B−V color index: +1.06

Astrometry
Radial velocity (R_{v})	−40.53 km/s
Proper motion (μ)	RA: +29.962±0.173 mas/yr Dec.: +80.440±0.173 mas/yr
Parallax (π)	20.9262±0.1208 mas
Distance	155.9 ± 0.9 ly (47.8 ± 0.3 pc)
Absolute magnitude (M_{V})	1.61

Details
Mass	1.73±0.09 M_{☉}
Radius	7.08±0.21 R_{☉}
Luminosity	26 L_{☉}
Surface gravity (log g)	3.03±0.10 cgs
Temperature	4,784±3.03 K
Metallicity [Fe/H]	+0.10 dex
Rotational velocity (v sin i)	1.3 km/s
Age	1.69±0.25 Gyr

Other designations
- η Sge, 16 Sge, BD+19°4277, FK5 3609, GC 27868, HD 190608, HIP 98920, HR 7679, SAO 105659, PPM 137588

Database references
SIMBAD	data

Eta Sagittae (η Sagittae) is solitary star in the northern constellation of Sagitta. It is faintly visible to the naked eye, having an apparent visual magnitude of +5.09. Based upon an annual parallax shift of 20.34 mas, it is approximately 160 light years distant from the Sun. There is a 61.1% chance that it is a member of the Hyades-Pleiades stream of stars that share a common motion through space.

This is an evolved K-type giant star with a stellar classification of K2 III. At the age of about 1.7 billion years, it is now a red clump star that is generating energy through the fusion of helium at its core. Eta Sagittae has 1.7 times the mass of the Sun and has expanded to seven times the Sun's radius. It is radiating 25.7 times the Sun's luminosity from its enlarged photosphere at an effective temperature of 4,784 K.
