= Theta Sagittae =

Double star in the constellation Sagitta

θ Sagittae
- Location of θ Sagittae (circled)

Observation data Epoch J2000.0 Equinox ICRS
- Constellation: Sagitta
- A
- Right ascension: 20^{h} 09^{m} 56.6468^{s}
- Declination: +20° 54′ 54.097″
- Apparent magnitude (V): +6.516
- B
- Right ascension: 20^{h} 09^{m} 56.2404^{s}
- Declination: +20° 55′ 04.230″
- Apparent magnitude (V): +8.769

Characteristics

A
- Evolutionary stage: main sequence
- Spectral type: F3V
- U−B color index: −0.04
- B−V color index: +0.38

B
- Evolutionary stage: main sequence
- Spectral type: G5V
- B−V color index: +0.732

Astrometry

A
Radial velocity (R_{v})	−40.95 km/s
Proper motion (μ)	RA: +58.569 mas/yr Dec.: +98.034 mas/yr
Parallax (π)	22.3879±0.0179 mas
Distance	145.7 ± 0.1 ly (44.67 ± 0.04 pc)
Absolute magnitude (M_{V})	+3.24

B
Radial velocity (R_{v})	−43.0 km/s
Proper motion (μ)	RA: +64.767 mas/yr Dec.: +101.629 mas/yr
Parallax (π)	22.4201±0.0141 mas
Distance	145.47 ± 0.09 ly (44.60 ± 0.03 pc)
Absolute magnitude (M_{V})	+5.58

Details

A
Mass	1.52 M_{☉}
Radius	1.5 R_{☉}
Luminosity	4.1 L_{☉}
Surface gravity (log g)	4.32 cgs
Temperature	6,750±229 K
Metallicity [Fe/H]	−0.17 dex
Rotational velocity (v sin i)	33.6 km/s
Age	2.089 Gyr

B
Mass	0.95 M_{☉}
Radius	0.82 R_{☉}
Luminosity	0.50 L_{☉}
Surface gravity (log g)	4.526 cgs
Temperature	5,414 K

Other designations
- θ Sge, 17 Sge, BD+20°4453, HD 191570, WDS J20099+2055
- A: HIP 99352, HR 7705, SAO 88276
- B: HIP 99351, SAO 88275

Database references
SIMBAD	A
- B

Theta Sagittae (θ Sagittae) is a double star in the northern constellation of Sagitta. With a combined apparent visual magnitude of +6, it is near the limit of stars that can be seen with the naked eye. According to the Bortle scale the star is visible in dark suburban/rural skies. Based upon an annual parallax shift of 22.15 mas as seen from Earth, it is located roughly 147 light years from the Sun.

The binary pair consists of two stars separated by 502 AU. The primary, component A, is an F-type main sequence star with a stellar classification of F3V. This star is about two billion years old with 52% more mass than the Sun. It forms a double star with a magnitude 8.85 companion, which is located at an angular separation of 11.58 arc seconds along a position angle of 331.1°, as of 2011. The star is sometimes described as a triple star, with a 7th magnitude companion 91″ away. This is an unrelated giant star much further away than the close pair. A fainter star separated by nearly 3′ was also listed as a companion by Struve, again just an accidental optical association.
