= WR 124 =

Star in the constellation Sagitta

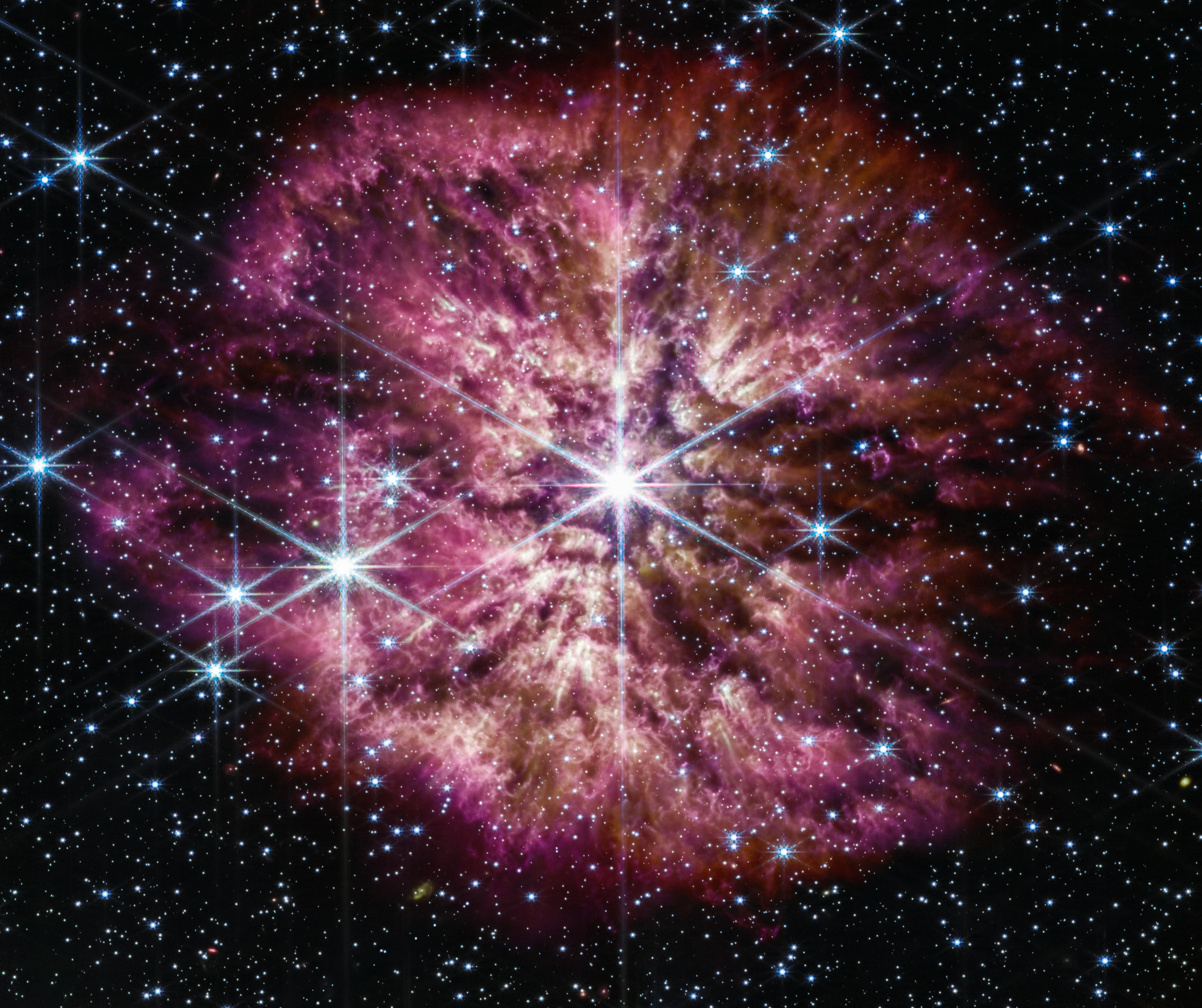
- NIRCam and MIRI composite image by the James Webb Space Telescope (north is approximately towards top left)

Observation data Epoch J2000 Equinox J2000
- Constellation: Sagitta
- Right ascension: 19^{h} 11^{m} 30.875^{s}
- Declination: +16° 51′ 38.20″
- Apparent magnitude (V): 11.17 – 11.25

Characteristics
- Evolutionary stage: Wolf–Rayet
- Spectral type: WN8h
- Apparent magnitude (B): 12.19±0.16
- Apparent magnitude (J): 8.578±0.024
- Apparent magnitude (H): 8.179±0.018
- Apparent magnitude (K): 7.732±0.018
- B−V color index: 0.69
- Variable type: Eruptive (WR)

Astrometry
Radial velocity (R_{v})	190±7.4 km/s
Proper motion (μ)	RA: −2.517±0.012 mas/yr Dec.: −5.671±0.012 mas/yr
Parallax (π)	0.1568±0.0140 mas
Distance	21,000 ± 2,000 ly (6,400 ± 600 pc)
Absolute magnitude (M_{V})	−6.58

Details
Mass	20 M_{☉}
Radius	11.93 R_{☉}
Luminosity	562,000 L_{☉}
Temperature	44,700 K
Age	8.6 Myr

Other designations
- Merrill's Star, Sh 2-80, Hen 2-427, QR Sagittae, HIP 94289, GSC 01586-00411

Database references
SIMBAD	data

WR 124 is a Wolf–Rayet star in the constellation of Sagitta surrounded by a ring nebula of expelled material known as M1-67. It is one of the fastest runaway stars in the Milky Way with a radial velocity around 200 km/s. It was discovered by Paul W. Merrill in 1938, identified as a high-velocity Wolf–Rayet star. In 1982, Anthony Moffat et al. discovered that WR 124 is a variable star. It was given its variable star designation, QR Sagittae, in 1985. It is listed in the General Catalogue of Variable Stars with a brightness range of 0.08 magnitudes.

== Distance ==
A 2010 study of WR 124 directly measured the expansion rate of the M1-67 nebula expelled from the star using Hubble Space Telescope camera images taken 11 years apart, and compared that to the expansion velocity measured by the Doppler shift of the nebular emission lines. This yielded a distance of 3.35 kpc, which is less than previous studies, and the resulting luminosity of 150,000 times the Sun (L_{☉}) is much lower than previously calculated. The luminosity is also lower than predicted by models for a star of this spectral class. Previous studies had found distances of 5 kpc to 8.4 kpc, with corresponding luminosities of 338,000–1,000,000 L_{☉}, as expected for a typical WN8h which is a very young star just moving away from the main sequence. The distance to WR 124 calculated from the parallax published in Gaia Data Release 2 is 6,203+1,621
−1,123 pc. Gaia Early Data Release 3 gives a similar parallax, which would suggest a distance 6,400+500
−500 pc.

== Physical characteristics ==
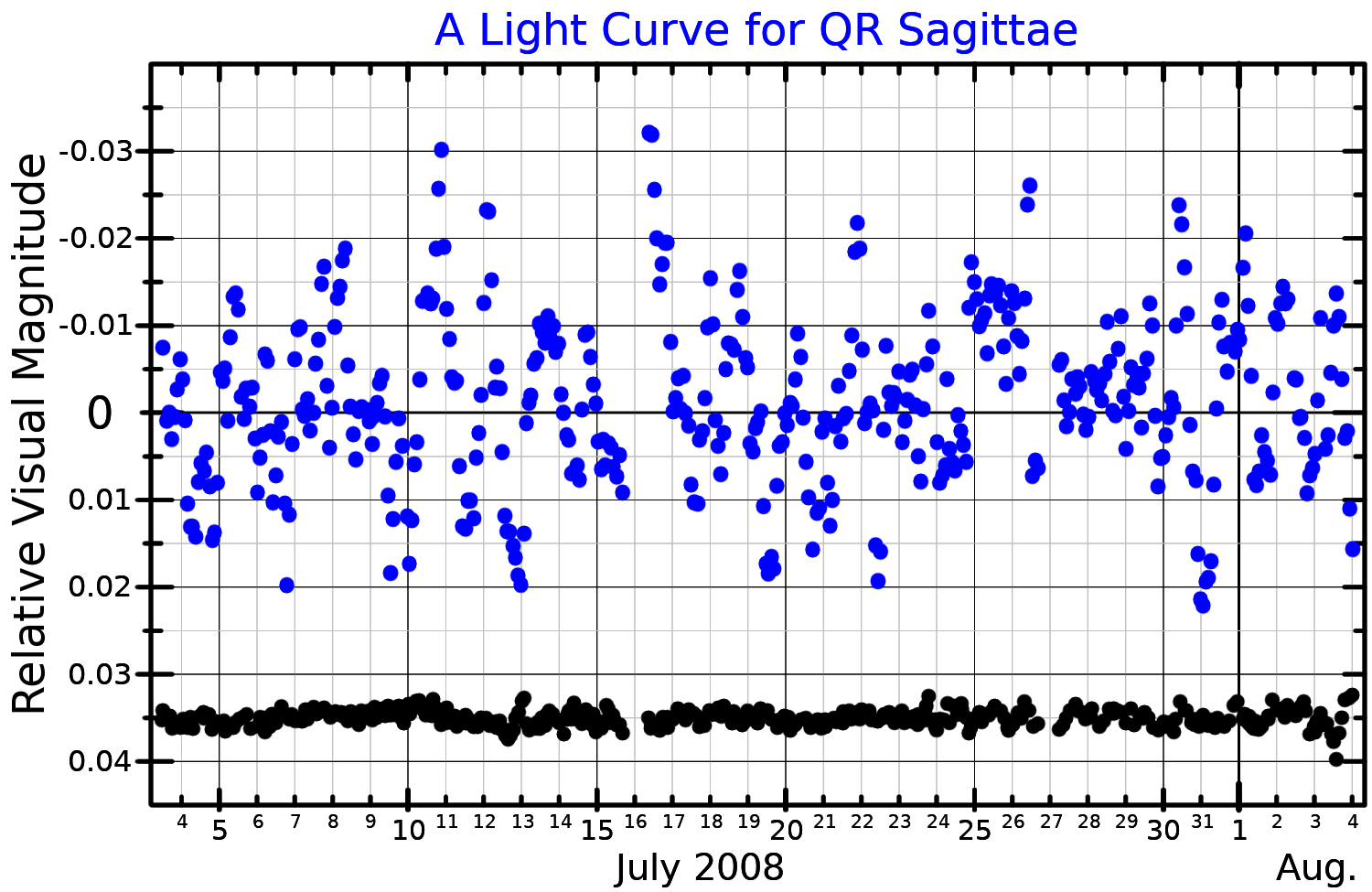
A visual band light curve for QR Sagittae, adapted from Weiss et al. (2014). The blue points show the magnitude of QR Sagittae, and the black points show the magnitude of a stable comparison star in the same field of view.

With an assumed visual absolute magnitude of −7.22 and 3.1 magnitudes of extinction, WR 124 would be 8.5 kpc away. The temperature of around 40,000 K means that most of its energy is emitted at ultraviolet wavelengths, the bolometric luminosity is 1,000,000 L_{☉} and the radius is 26 R_{☉}. The mass is calculated from evolutionary models to be 33 M_{☉}.

WR 124 is measured to still be about 15% hydrogen with most of the remaining mass being helium. A young highly massive and luminous WN8h star would still be burning hydrogen in its core, but a less luminous and older star would be burning helium in its core. The result of modelling the star purely from its observed characteristics is a luminosity of 1,000,000 L_{☉} and a mass of 33 M_{☉}, corresponding to a relatively young hydrogen-burning star at around 8 kpc. In either case, it has only a few hundred thousand years before it explodes as a type Ib or Ic supernova.

The mass loss rate is 10^{−5} M_{☉}–10^{−4} M_{☉} per year, depending on the distance and properties determined for the star.

== Nebula ==
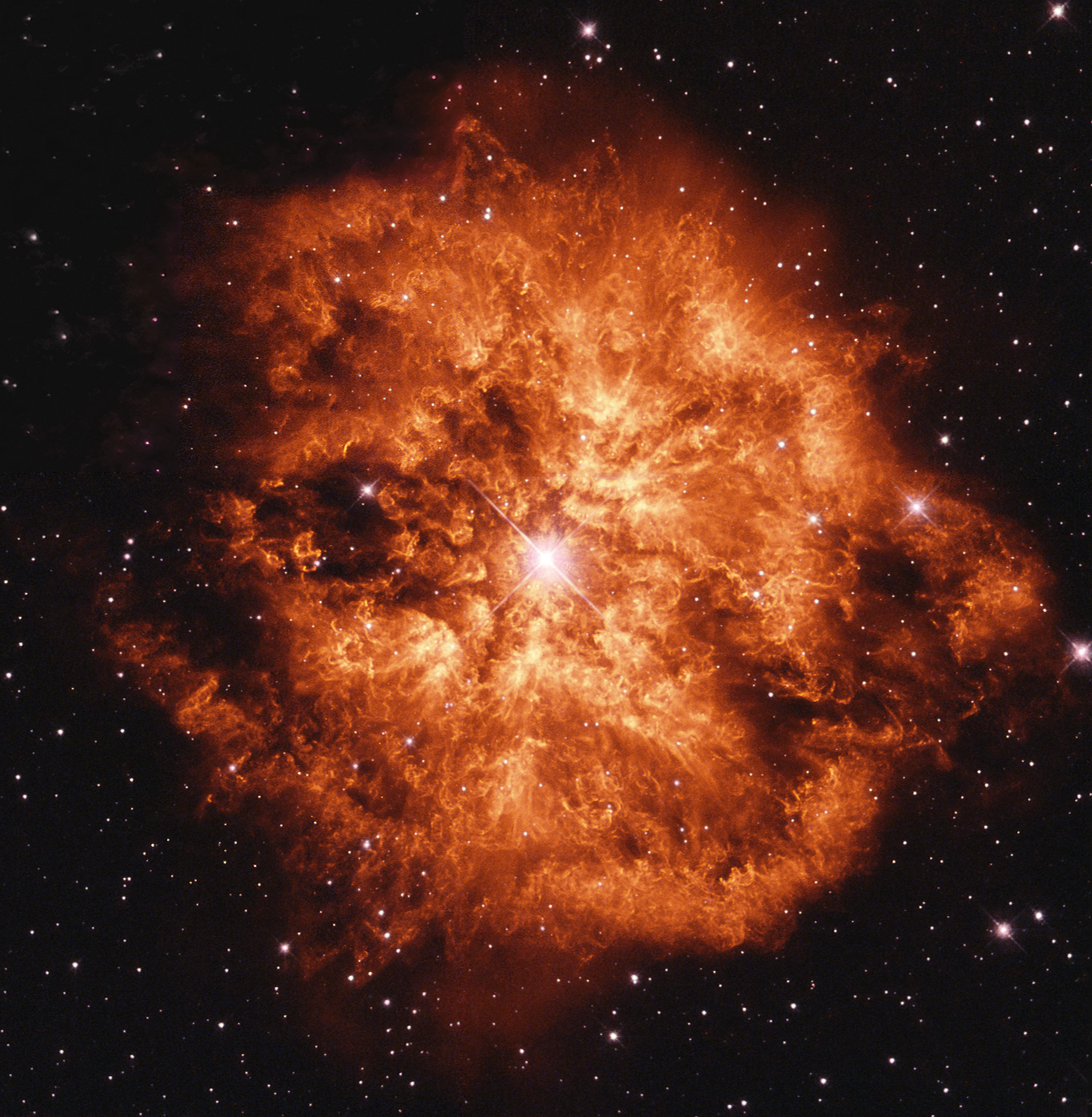
Hubble Space Telescope image of the nebula M1-67 and WR 124 at its center (north is down)

WR 124 is surrounded by an intensely hot nebula formed from the star's extreme stellar wind. The nebula M1-67 is expanding at a rate of over 150,000 km/h (93,000 mph) and is nearly 6 light-years across, leading to the dynamical age of 20,000 years. M1-67 has little internal structure, though large clumps of material have been detected, some of which have 30 times the mass of Earth and stretch out up to 150 billion km (93 billion mi). If placed in the Solar System, one of these clumps would span the distance from the Sun to Saturn.
