= Herculea =

Herculea was a southern Italian colony of the classical Greek city Megara (or The Megarid) which was located in Magna Graecia on the isthmus across to the Peloponnese, adjacent to Corinth and Attica.

Herculea, though not referred to often in the writings of historians at the time such as Herodotus and Thucydides, was a considerable step towards Mediterranean discovery and expansion for the more often than not isolationist Peloponnesian League related city/states. Phanias of Eresus, who was a student of Aristotle, mentioned it in his account of an ancient personality called Antileon, who stole a bell from the colony.

A settlement, which became a municipium during the Roman period, between Telese and San Salvatore Telesino was also referred to as Colonia Herculea Telesina and was settled in the 1st century B.C. It was founded by the Samnites and was particularly noted for its defensive concave walls, some of which are still preserved.
