= Epsilon Sagittae =

Star in the constellation Sagitta

- Location of ε Sagittae (circled)

Observation data Epoch J2000.0 Equinox J2000.0 (ICRS)
- Constellation: Sagitta
- Right ascension: 19^{h} 37^{m} 17.39324^{s}
- Declination: +16° 27′ 46.0871″
- Apparent magnitude (V): +5.64 to +5.67

Characteristics
- Evolutionary stage: horizontal branch
- Spectral type: G8 IIIvar
- U−B color index: +0.83
- B−V color index: +1.00

Astrometry
Radial velocity (R_{v})	−32.49±0.18 km/s
Proper motion (μ)	RA: +16.382±0.164 mas/yr Dec.: +14.364±0.135 mas/yr
Parallax (π)	5.6067±0.1173 mas
Distance	580 ± 10 ly (178 ± 4 pc)
Absolute magnitude (M_{V})	−0.84±0.03

Details
Mass	2.9 M_{☉}
Radius	18.37+0.65 −0.88 R_{☉}
Luminosity	184.9±4.6 L_{☉}
Surface gravity (log g)	2.52 cgs
Temperature	4966+124 −85 K
Metallicity [Fe/H]	+0.02 dex
Rotational velocity (v sin i)	3.2 km/s
Age	520 Myr

Other designations
- ε Sge, 4 Sge, BD+16°3918, HD 185194, HIP 96516, HR 7463, WDS J19373+1628A

Database references
SIMBAD	data

Epsilon Sagittae (ε Sagittae) is a solitary, yellow-hued star in the northern constellation of Sagitta. With an apparent visual magnitude of +5.64 to +5.67, it is faintly visible to the naked eye on a dark night. It is a variable star with a small amplitude of 0.03 magnitudes. Based upon an annual parallax shift of 5.60 mas as seen from Earth, it is located roughly 580 light years from the Sun. At that distance, the visual magnitude of the star is diminished by an extinction factor of 0.1 due to interstellar dust.

This is an evolved, G-type giant star with a stellar classification of G8 IIIvar, where the 'var' suffix indicates a variable spectral feature. The star is about 520 million years old with about three times the mass of the Sun. It is radiating 185 times the Sun's luminosity from its photosphere at an effective temperature of 4,966 K.

Epsilon Sagittae is an optical binary, with a companion of magnitude 8.35 at an angular separation of 87.3 arc seconds along a position angle of 82°, as of 2013. The companion is actually a more distant giant star approximately 7,000 light-years from Earth, with a luminosity 1,800 times that of the Sun and also designated HD 232029.
