= 15 Sagittae =

G-type main sequence star in the constellation Sagitta

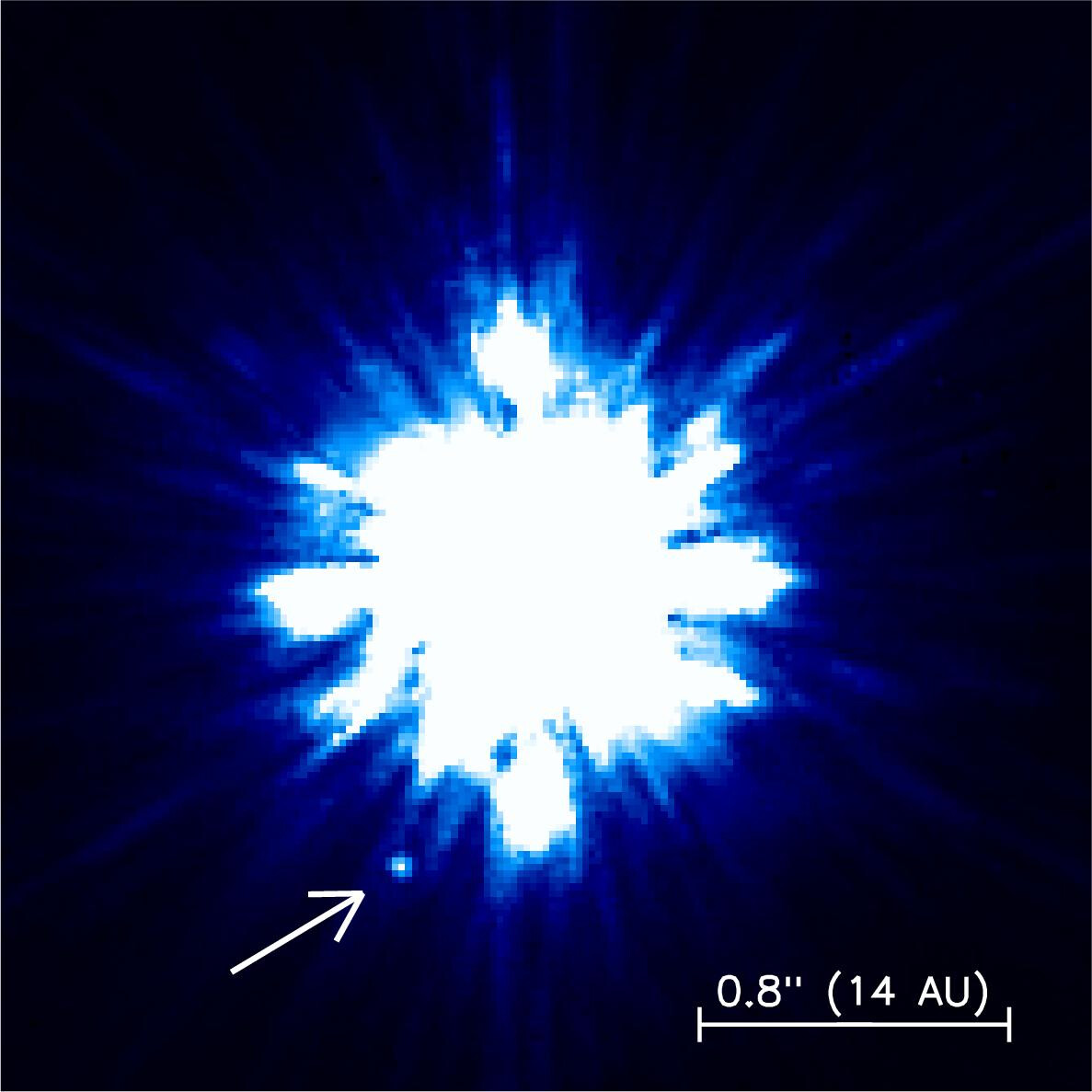
- 15 Sagittae and its companion Credit: Keck Observatory

Observation data Epoch J2000.0 Equinox ICRS
- Constellation: Sagitta
- Right ascension: 20^{h} 04^{m} 06.22077^{s}
- Declination: +17° 04′ 12.6766″
- Apparent magnitude (V): 5.80

Characteristics
- Evolutionary stage: main sequence
- Spectral type: G0V + L4
- B−V color index: 0.600±0.005

Astrometry
Radial velocity (R_{v})	4.57±0.1 km/s
Proper motion (μ)	RA: −387.472 mas/yr Dec.: −419.497 mas/yr
Parallax (π)	56.2724±0.0094 mas
Distance	57.960 ± 0.010 ly (17.771 ± 0.003 pc)
Absolute magnitude (M_{V})	4.55

Orbit
Period (P)	63.77+0.63 −0.61 yr
Semi-major axis (a)	16.88±0.10 AU
Eccentricity (e)	0.4683+0.0032 −0.0031
Inclination (i)	97.73±0.31°
Longitude of the node (Ω)	330.88±0.21°
Periastron epoch (T)	2,457,070±11 JD
Argument of periastron (ω) (secondary)	266.23±0.45°

Details

15 Sge A
Mass	1.114±0.013 M_{☉}
Radius	1.051±0.010 R_{☉}
Luminosity	1.224±0.043 L_{☉}
Surface gravity (log g)	4.442±0.010 cgs
Temperature	5,932±81 K
Metallicity [Fe/H]	+0.051±0.057 dex
Rotation	14.8±1.3 days
Rotational velocity (v sin i)	4.42±0.06 km/s
Age	2.26±0.40 Gyr

15 Sge B
Mass	75.39±0.67 M_{Jup}
Radius	0.81+0.09 −0.08 R_{Jup}
Luminosity	6.46+0.62 −0.57×10^{−5} L_{☉}
Surface gravity (log g)	5.46±0.09 cgs
Temperature	1,544+26 −31 K
Rotational velocity (v sin i)	45.0±0.5 km/s

Other designations
- 15 Sge, BD+16°4121, GJ 779, HD 190406, HIP 98819, HR 7672, SAO 105635, LFT 1517, LHS 3515, LTT 15872, Wolf 866

Database references
SIMBAD	data

15 Sagittae (15 Sge) is a star in the northern constellation Sagitta, located around 58 light years away from the Sun. It is visible to the naked eye as a faint, yellow-hued star with an apparent visual magnitude of 5.80.

John Flamsteed labelled this star as z Sagittae, but the designation was dropped by later authors and is now largely unknown.

== Characteristics ==
The spectrum of 15 Sagittae matches a spectral class of G0V, with the luminosity class V indicating it is a main sequence star fusing atoms of hydrogen into helium at its core. 15 Sagittae is a solar analog, having 1.11 times the mass of the Sun, 1.05 times the Sun's radius, and 1.22 times the Sun's luminosity, and an effective temperature of 5,932 K. This temperature also gives it the yellow hue typical of a G-type star. The abundance of metals in the stellar atmosphere (metallicity) is also close to solar, with an iron-to-hydrogen abundance ratio equivalent to 12% of that found in the Sun. The star's age is estimated at 2.26 billion years.

== Companion ==
15 Sagittae was the target of the first radial velocity survey from Lick Observatory, which found a drift due to a companion. In 2002, the cause of this was found to be a brown dwarf companion, 15 Sagittae B, detected via direct imaging at the Keck telescope.

15 Sagittae B is a high-mass brown dwarf of spectral class L4, making it a L dwarf. It has a radius equivalent to 81% that of Jupiter, an effective temperature of 1,544 K (1,271 °C; 2,320 °F), and a luminosity of 0.000065 (6.5×10^{−5}) times that of the Sun. The brown dwarf has a cloudy atmosphere and an elemental abundance similar to that of the host star. Its projected rotational velocity is 45 km/s, relatively fast for a brown dwarf, making it highly suitable for Doppler imaging.

The brown dwarf orbits with a period of 63.8 years around the primary star, having a semi-major axis of 16.88 astronomical units, a moderate eccentricity of 0.468, and an inclination of 97.7° relative to Earth. Along with its orbit, its mass has been determined dynamically with direct imaging, radial velocity variations caused by its gravitational pull around the star, and by the astrometric shift it exerts in the star's proper motion measurements taken by the Hipparcos and Gaia spacecraft over a 20-year timespan, yielding a value of 75 Jupiter masses. 15 Sagittae B therefore is part of a select group of brown dwarfs with masses, ages, and luminosities determined without relying on substellar evolution models, making it a useful object to test the accuracy of such models. At the discovery, it was thought to have a semi-major axis of 14 AU and a circular orbit viewed from pole-on, but these properties were later massively revised with more observations. It is now approaching the primary as viewed from Earth.
