= Supersoft X-ray source =

X-ray source that only emits soft X-rays

A luminous supersoft X-ray source (SSXS, or SSS) is an astronomical source that emits only low energy (i.e., soft) X-rays. Soft X-rays have energies in the 0.09 to 2.5 keV range, whereas hard X-rays are in the 1–20 keV range. SSSs emit few or no photons with energies above 1 keV, and most have effective temperature below 100 eV. This means that the radiation they emit is highly ionizing and is readily absorbed by the interstellar medium. Most SSSs within our own galaxy are hidden by interstellar absorption in the galactic disk. They are readily evident in external galaxies, with ~10 found in the Magellanic Clouds and at least 15 seen in M31.

As of early 2005, more than 100 SSSs have been reported in ~20 external galaxies, the Large Magellanic Cloud (LMC), Small Magellanic Cloud (SMC), and the Milky Way (MW). Those with luminosities below ~3 × 10^{38} erg/s are consistent with steady nuclear burning in accreting white dwarfs (WD)s or post-novae. There are a few SSS with luminosities ≥10^{39} erg/s.

Supersoft X-rays are believed to be produced by steady nuclear fusion on a white dwarf's surface of material pulled from a binary companion, the so-called close-binary supersoft source (CBSS). This requires a flow of material sufficiently high to sustain the fusion. Contrast this with the nova, where less flow causes the material to only fuse sporadically. Supersoft X-ray sources can evolve into type Ia supernova, where a sudden fusion of material destroys the white dwarf, and neutron stars, through collapse.

Supersoft X-ray sources were first discovered by the Einstein Observatory. Further discoveries were made by ROSAT. Many different classes of objects emit supersoft X-radiation (emission dominantly below 0.5 keV).

== Luminous supersoft X-ray sources ==
Luminous supersoft X-ray sources have a characteristic blackbody temperature of a few tens of eV (~20–100 eV) and a bolometric luminosity of ~10^{38} erg/s (below ~ 3 × 10^{38} erg/s).

Apparently, luminous SSXSs can have equivalent blackbody temperatures as low as ~15 eV and luminosities ranging from 10^{36} to 10^{38} erg/s. The numbers of luminous SSSs in the disks of ordinary spiral galaxies such as the MW and M31 are estimated to be on the order of 10^{3}.

== Milky Way SSXSs ==
SSXSs have now been discovered in our galaxy and in globular cluster M3. MR Velorum (RX J0925.7-4758) is one of the rare MW supersoft X-ray binaries. "The source is heavily reddened by interstellar material, making it difficult to observe in the blue and ultraviolet." The period determined for MR Velorum at ~4.03 d is considerably longer than that of other supersoft systems, which is usually less than a day.

== Close-binary supersoft source (CBSS) ==
The CBSS model invokes steady nuclear burning on the surface of an accreting white dwarf (WD) as the generator of the prodigious supersoft X-ray flux. As of 1999, eight SSXSs have orbital periods between ~4 hr and 1.35 d: RX J0019.8+2156 (MW), RX J0439.8-6809 (MW halo near LMC), RX J0513.9-6951 (LMC), RX J0527.8-6954 (LMC), RX J0537.7-7034 (LMC), CAL 83 (LMC), CAL 87 LMC), and 1E 0035.4-7230 (SMC).

== Symbiotic binary ==
A symbiotic binary star is a variable binary star system in which a red giant has expanded its outer envelope and is shedding mass quickly, and another hot star (often a white dwarf) is ionizing the gas. Three symbiotic binaries as of 1999 are SSXSs: AG Dra (BB, MW), RR Tel (WD, MW), and RX J0048.4-7332 (WD, SMC).

== Noninteracting white dwarfs ==
The youngest, hottest WD, KPD 0005+5106, is very close to 100,000 K, of type DO and is the first single WD recorded as an X-ray source with ROSAT.

== Cataclysmic variables ==
"Cataclysmic variables (CVs) are close binary systems consisting of a white dwarf and a red-dwarf secondary transferring matter via the Roche lobe overflow." Both fusion- and accretion-powered cataclysmic variables have been observed to be X-ray sources. The accretion disk may be prone to instability leading to dwarf nova outbursts: a portion of the disk material falls onto the white dwarf, the cataclysmic outbursts occur when the density and temperature at the bottom of the accumulated hydrogen layer rise high enough to ignite nuclear fusion reactions, which rapidly burn the hydrogen layer to helium.

Apparently the only SSXS nonmagnetic cataclysmic variable is V Sagittae: bolometric luminosity of (1–10) × 10^{37}, a binary including a blackbody (BB) accretor at T < 80 eV, and an orbital period of 0.514195 d.

The accretion disk can become thermally stable in systems with high mass-transfer rates (Ṁ). Such systems are called nova-like (NL) stars, because they lack outbursts characteristic of dwarf novae.

== VY Scl cataclysmic variables ==
Among the NL stars is a small group which shows a temporary reduction or cessation of Ṁ from the secondary. These are the VY Scl-type stars or anti-dwarf novae.

=== V751 Cyg ===
V751 Cyg (BB, MW) is a VY Scl CV, has a bolometric luminosity of 6.5 × 10^{36} erg/s, and emits soft X-rays at quiescence. The discovery of a weak soft X-ray source of V751 Cyg at minimum presents a challenge as this is unusual for CVs which commonly display weak hard X-ray emission at quiescence.

The high luminosity (6.5 × 10^{36} erg/s) is particularly hard to understand in the context of VY Scl stars generally, because observations suggest that the binaries become simple red dwarf + white dwarf pairs at quiescence (the disk mostly disappears). "A high luminosity in soft X-rays poses an additional problem of understanding why the spectrum is of only modest excitation." The ratio He II λ4686/Hβ did not exceed ~0.5 in any of the spectra recorded up to 2001, which is typical for accretion-powered CVs and does not approach the ratio of 2 commonly seen in supersoft binaries (CBSS).

Pushing the edge of acceptable X-ray fits toward lower luminosity suggests that the luminosity should not exceed ~2 × 10^{33} ergs/s, which gives only ~4 × 10^{31} ergs/s of reprocessed light in the WD about equal to the secondary's expected nuclear luminosity.

== Magnetic cataclysmic variables ==
X-rays from magnetic cataclysmic variables are common because accretion provides a continuous supply of coronal gas. A plot of number of systems vs. orbit period shows a statistically significant minimum for periods between 2 and 3 hr which can probably be understood in terms of the effects of magnetic braking when the companion star becomes completely convective and the usual dynamo (which operates at the base of the convective envelope) can no longer give the companion a magnetic wind to carry off angular momentum. The rotation has been blamed on asymmetric ejection of planetary nebulae and winds and the fields on in situ dynamos. Orbit and rotation periods are synchronized in strongly magnetized WDs. Those with no detectable field never are synchronized.

With temperatures in the range 11,000 to 15,000 K, all the WDs with the most extreme fields are far too cool to be detectable EUV/X-ray sources, e.g., Grw +70°8247, LB 11146, SBS 1349+5434, PG 1031+234 and GD 229.

Most highly magnetic WDs appear to be isolated objects, although G 23–46 (7.4 MG) and LB 1116 (670 MG) are in unresolved binary systems.

RE J0317-853 is the hottest magnetic WD at 49,250 K, with an exceptionally intense magnetic field of ~340 MG, and implied rotation period of 725.4 s. Between 0.1 and 0.4 keV, RE J0317-853 was detectable by ROSAT, but not in the higher energy band from 0.4 to 2.4 keV. RE J0317-853 is associated with a blue star 16 arcsec from LB 9802 (also a blue WD) but not physically associated. A centered dipole field is not able to reproduce the observations, but an off-center dipole 664 MG at the south pole and 197 MG at the north pole does.

Until recently (1995) only PG 1658+441 possessed an effective temperature > 30,000 K. Its polar field strength is only 3 MG.

The ROSAT Wide Field Camera (WFC) source RE J0616-649 has an ~20 MG field.

PG 1031+234 has a surface field that spans the range from ~200 MG to nearly 1000 MG and rotates with a period of 3^{h}24^{m}.

The magnetic fields in CVs are confined to a narrow range of strengths, with a maximum of 7080 MG for RX J1938.4-4623.

None of the single magnetic stars has been seen as of 1999 as an X-ray source, although fields are of direct relevance to the maintenance of coronae in main sequence stars.

== PG 1159 stars ==
PG 1159 stars are a group of very hot, often pulsating WDs for which the prototype is PG 1159 dominated by carbon and oxygen in their atmospheres.

PG 1159 stars reach luminosities of ~10^{38} erg/s but form a rather distinct class. RX J0122.9-7521 has been identified as a galactic PG 1159 star.

== Nova ==
There are three SSXSs with bolometric luminosity of ~10^{38} erg/s that are novae: GQ Mus (BB, MW), V1974 Cyg (WD, MW), and Nova LMC 1995 (WD). Apparently, as of 1999 the orbital period of Nova LMC 1995 if a binary was not known.

U Sco, a recurrent nova as of 1999 unobserved by ROSAT, is a WD (74–76 eV), L_{bol} ~ (8–60) × 10^{36} erg/s, with an orbital period of 1.2306 d.

== Planetary nebula ==
In the SMC, 1E 0056.8-7154 is a WD with bolometric luminosity of 2 × 10^{37} that has a planetary nebula associated with it.

== Supersoft active galactic nuclei ==
Supersoft active galactic nuclei reach luminosities up to 10^{45} erg/s.

== Large amplitude outbursts ==
Large amplitude outbursts of supersoft X-ray emission have been interpreted as tidal disruption events.

== See also ==
- Carbon detonation
- Type Ia supernova
- X-ray astronomy
