= Aquila in Chinese astronomy =

Constellation in Chinese astronomy

The modern constellation Aquila lies across one of the quadrants symbolized by the Black Tortoise of the North (北方玄武, Běi Fāng Xuán Wǔ), and Three Enclosures (三垣, Sān Yuán) that divide the sky in traditional Chinese uranography.

The name of the western constellation in modern Chinese is 天鷹座 (tiān yīng zuò), meaning "the heaven eagle constellation".

== Stars ==
The map of Chinese constellation in constellation Aquila area consists of :

Four Symbols	Mansion (Chinese name)	Romanization	Translation	Asterisms (Chinese name)	Romanization	Translation	Western star name	Proper Name	Chinese star name	Romanization	Translation
Three Enclosures (三垣)	天市垣	Tiān Shì Yuán	Heavenly Market enclosure	天市左垣	Tiānshìzuǒyuán	Left Wall					
Three Enclosures (三垣)	天市垣	Tiān Shì Yuán	Heavenly Market enclosure	天市左垣	Tiānshìzuǒyuán	Left Wall	ζ Aql	Okab (for component A)			
Three Enclosures (三垣)	天市垣	Tiān Shì Yuán	Heavenly Market enclosure	天市左垣	Tiānshìzuǒyuán	Left Wall	ζ Aql	Okab (for component A)	天市左垣六	Tiānshìzuǒyuánliù	6th star
Three Enclosures (三垣)	天市垣	Tiān Shì Yuán	Heavenly Market enclosure	天市左垣	Tiānshìzuǒyuán	Left Wall	ζ Aql	Okab (for component A)	吳越	Wúyuè	(Star of) Wu and Yue
Three Enclosures (三垣)	天市垣	Tiān Shì Yuán	Heavenly Market enclosure	天市左垣	Tiānshìzuǒyuán	Left Wall	ε Aql	Arin-majleb	吳越增一	Wúyuèzēngyī	1st additional star of Wu and Yue
Three Enclosures (三垣)	天市垣	Tiān Shì Yuán	Heavenly Market enclosure	天市左垣	Tiānshìzuǒyuán	Left Wall	10 Aql		吳越增二	Wúyuèzēngèr	2nd additional star of Wu and Yue
Three Enclosures (三垣)	天市垣	Tiān Shì Yuán	Heavenly Market enclosure	天市左垣	Tiānshìzuǒyuán	Left Wall	11 Aql		吳越增三	Wúyuèzēngsān	3rd additional star of Wu and Yue
Three Enclosures (三垣)	天市垣	Tiān Shì Yuán	Heavenly Market enclosure	天市左垣	Tiānshìzuǒyuán	Left Wall	18 Aql		吳越增四	Wúyuèzēngsì	4th additional star of Wu and Yue
Three Enclosures (三垣)	天市垣	Tiān Shì Yuán	Heavenly Market enclosure	天市左垣	Tiānshìzuǒyuán	Left Wall	ω^{1} Aql		吳越增五	Wúyuèzēngwǔ	5th additional star of Wu and Yue
Three Enclosures (三垣)	天市垣	Tiān Shì Yuán	Heavenly Market enclosure	天市左垣	Tiānshìzuǒyuán	Left Wall	28 Aql		吳越增六	Wúyuèzēngliù	6th additional star of Wu and Yue
Three Enclosures (三垣)	天市垣	Tiān Shì Yuán	Heavenly Market enclosure	天市左垣	Tiānshìzuǒyuán	Left Wall	31 Aql		吳越增七	Wúyuèzēngqī	7th additional star of Wu and Yue
Three Enclosures (三垣)	天市垣	Tiān Shì Yuán	Heavenly Market enclosure	天市左垣	Tiānshìzuǒyuán	Left Wall	4 Aql		徐增一	Xúzēngyī	1st additional star of Xu
Three Enclosures (三垣)	天市垣	Tiān Shì Yuán	Heavenly Market enclosure	天市左垣	Tiānshìzuǒyuán	Left Wall	62 Ser		徐增二	Xúzēngèr	2nd additional star of Xu
Three Enclosures (三垣)	天市垣	Tiān Shì Yuán	Heavenly Market enclosure	天市左垣	Tiānshìzuǒyuán	Left Wall	19 Aql		徐增三	Xúzēngsān	3rd additional star of Xu
Black Tortoise of the North (北方玄武)	斗	Dǒu	Dipper	天弁	Tiānbiàn	Market Officer					
Black Tortoise of the North (北方玄武)	斗	Dǒu	Dipper	天弁	Tiānbiàn	Market Officer	12 Aql		天弁六	Tiānbiànliù	6th star
Black Tortoise of the North (北方玄武)	斗	Dǒu	Dipper	天弁	Tiānbiàn	Market Officer	λ Aql		天弁七	Tiānbiànqī	7th star
Black Tortoise of the North (北方玄武)	斗	Dǒu	Dipper	天弁	Tiānbiàn	Market Officer	15 Aql		天弁八	Tiānbiànbā	8th star
Black Tortoise of the North (北方玄武)	斗	Dǒu	Dipper	天弁	Tiānbiàn	Market Officer	14 Aql		天弁九	Tiānbiànjiǔ	9th star
Black Tortoise of the North (北方玄武)	斗	Dǒu	Dipper	天弁	Tiānbiàn	Market Officer	5 Aql		天弁增一	Tiānbiànzēngyī	1st additional star
Black Tortoise of the North (北方玄武)	斗	Dǒu	Dipper	天弁	Tiānbiàn	Market Officer	7 Aql		天弁增二	Tiānbiànzēngèr	2nd additional star
Black Tortoise of the North (北方玄武)	斗	Dǒu	Dipper	天弁	Tiānbiàn	Market Officer	8 Aql		天弁增三	Tiānbiànzēngsān	3rd additional star
Black Tortoise of the North (北方玄武)	斗	Dǒu	Dipper	天弁	Tiānbiàn	Market Officer	20 Aql		天弁增四	Tiānbiànzēngsì	4th additional star
Black Tortoise of the North (北方玄武)	斗	Dǒu	Dipper	天弁	Tiānbiàn	Market Officer	21 Aql		天弁增五	Tiānbiànzēngwǔ	5th additional star
Black Tortoise of the North (北方玄武)	牛	Niú	Ox	河鼓	Hégŭ	Drum at the River					
Black Tortoise of the North (北方玄武)	牛	Niú	Ox	河鼓	Hégŭ	Drum at the River	β Aql	Alshain (for component A)			
Black Tortoise of the North (北方玄武)	牛	Niú	Ox	河鼓	Hégŭ	Drum at the River	β Aql	Alshain (for component A)	河鼓一	Hégŭyī	1st star
Black Tortoise of the North (北方玄武)	牛	Niú	Ox	河鼓	Hégŭ	Drum at the River	β Aql	Alshain (for component A)	左將軍	Zuǒjiāngjūn	Left-side general
Black Tortoise of the North (北方玄武)	牛	Niú	Ox	河鼓	Hégŭ	Drum at the River	α Aql	Altair			
Black Tortoise of the North (北方玄武)	牛	Niú	Ox	河鼓	Hégŭ	Drum at the River	α Aql	Altair	河鼓二	Hégŭèr	2nd star
Black Tortoise of the North (北方玄武)	牛	Niú	Ox	河鼓	Hégŭ	Drum at the River	α Aql	Altair	河鼓大星	Hégŭběixīng	Northern star
Black Tortoise of the North (北方玄武)	牛	Niú	Ox	河鼓	Hégŭ	Drum at the River	α Aql	Altair	河鼓大星	Hégŭdàxīng	Big star
Black Tortoise of the North (北方玄武)	牛	Niú	Ox	河鼓	Hégŭ	Drum at the River	α Aql	Altair	牵牛星	Qiān Niú Xīng	Star of cows
Black Tortoise of the North (北方玄武)	牛	Niú	Ox	河鼓	Hégŭ	Drum at the River	α Aql	Altair	牛郎星	Niú Láng Xīng	Star of the cowherd
Black Tortoise of the North (北方玄武)	牛	Niú	Ox	河鼓	Hégŭ	Drum at the River	α Aql	Altair	大將軍	Dàjiāngjūn	Great general
Black Tortoise of the North (北方玄武)	牛	Niú	Ox	河鼓	Hégŭ	Drum at the River	α Aql	Altair	牛星	Niúxīng	Star of cow
Black Tortoise of the North (北方玄武)	牛	Niú	Ox	河鼓	Hégŭ	Drum at the River	α Aql	Altair	星纪	Xīngjì	Star of Ji
Black Tortoise of the North (北方玄武)	牛	Niú	Ox	河鼓	Hégŭ	Drum at the River	α Aql	Altair	檐鼓	Yángǔ	Drum in the eaves
Black Tortoise of the North (北方玄武)	牛	Niú	Ox	河鼓	Hégŭ	Drum at the River	γ Aql	Tarazed			
Black Tortoise of the North (北方玄武)	牛	Niú	Ox	河鼓	Hégŭ	Drum at the River	γ Aql	Tarazed	河鼓三	Hégŭsān	3rd star
Black Tortoise of the North (北方玄武)	牛	Niú	Ox	河鼓	Hégŭ	Drum at the River	γ Aql	Tarazed	河鼓北星	Hégŭběixīng	Northern star
Black Tortoise of the North (北方玄武)	牛	Niú	Ox	河鼓	Hégŭ	Drum at the River	γ Aql	Tarazed	右將軍	Yòujiāngjūn	Right-side general
Black Tortoise of the North (北方玄武)	牛	Niú	Ox	河鼓	Hégŭ	Drum at the River	ψ Aql		河鼓增一	Hégŭzēngyī	1st additional star
Black Tortoise of the North (北方玄武)	牛	Niú	Ox	河鼓	Hégŭ	Drum at the River	46 Aql		河鼓增二	Hégŭzēngèr	2nd additional star
Black Tortoise of the North (北方玄武)	牛	Niú	Ox	河鼓	Hégŭ	Drum at the River	χ Aql		河鼓增三	Hégŭzēngsān	3rd additional star
Black Tortoise of the North (北方玄武)	牛	Niú	Ox	河鼓	Hégŭ	Drum at the River	π Aql		河鼓增四	Hégŭzēngsì	4th additional star
Black Tortoise of the North (北方玄武)	牛	Niú	Ox	河鼓	Hégŭ	Drum at the River	ο Aql		河鼓增五	Hégŭzēngwǔ	5th additional star
Black Tortoise of the North (北方玄武)	牛	Niú	Ox	河鼓	Hégŭ	Drum at the River	φ Aql		河鼓增六	Hégŭzēngliù	6th additional star
Black Tortoise of the North (北方玄武)	牛	Niú	Ox	河鼓	Hégŭ	Drum at the River	τ Aql	Tianfu	河鼓增七	Hégŭzēngqī	7th additional star
Black Tortoise of the North (北方玄武)	牛	Niú	Ox	河鼓	Hégŭ	Drum at the River	ξ Aql	Libertas	河鼓增八	Hégŭzēngbā	8th additional star
Black Tortoise of the North (北方玄武)	牛	Niú	Ox	河鼓	Hégŭ	Drum at the River	υ Aql		河鼓增九	Hégŭzēngjiǔ	9th additional star
Black Tortoise of the North (北方玄武)	牛	Niú	Ox	左旗	Zuǒqí	Left Flag					
Black Tortoise of the North (北方玄武)	牛	Niú	Ox	左旗	Zuǒqí	Left Flag	14 Sge		左旗八	Zuǒqíbā	8th star
Black Tortoise of the North (北方玄武)	牛	Niú	Ox	左旗	Zuǒqí	Left Flag	ρ Aql		左旗九	Zuǒqíjiǔ	9th star
Black Tortoise of the North (北方玄武)	牛	Niú	Ox	右旗	Yòuqí	Right Flag					
Black Tortoise of the North (北方玄武)	牛	Niú	Ox	右旗	Yòuqí	Right Flag	μ Aql		右旗一	Yòuqíyī	1st star
Black Tortoise of the North (北方玄武)	牛	Niú	Ox	右旗	Yòuqí	Right Flag	σ Aql	Hru	右旗二	Yòuqíèr	2nd star
Black Tortoise of the North (北方玄武)	牛	Niú	Ox	右旗	Yòuqí	Right Flag	δ Aql	Guqi			
Black Tortoise of the North (北方玄武)	牛	Niú	Ox	右旗	Yòuqí	Right Flag	δ Aql	Guqi	右旗三	Yòuqísān	3rd star
Black Tortoise of the North (北方玄武)	牛	Niú	Ox	右旗	Yòuqí	Right Flag	δ Aql	Guqi	轩屏南星	Xuānbǐngnánxīng	Star of wide folding screen in the south
Black Tortoise of the North (北方玄武)	牛	Niú	Ox	右旗	Yòuqí	Right Flag	ν Aql		右旗四	Yòuqísì	4th star
Black Tortoise of the North (北方玄武)	牛	Niú	Ox	右旗	Yòuqí	Right Flag	ι Aql		右旗五	Yòuqíwu	5th star
Black Tortoise of the North (北方玄武)	牛	Niú	Ox	右旗	Yòuqí	Right Flag	HD 184701		右旗六	Yòuqíliù	6th star
Black Tortoise of the North (北方玄武)	牛	Niú	Ox	右旗	Yòuqí	Right Flag	42 Aql		右旗七	Yòuqíqī	7th star
Black Tortoise of the North (北方玄武)	牛	Niú	Ox	右旗	Yòuqí	Right Flag	κ Aql		右旗八	Yòuqíbā	8th star
Black Tortoise of the North (北方玄武)	牛	Niú	Ox	右旗	Yòuqí	Right Flag	56 Aql		右旗九	Yòuqíjiǔ	9th star
Black Tortoise of the North (北方玄武)	牛	Niú	Ox	右旗	Yòuqí	Right Flag	22 Aql		右旗增一	Yòuqízēngyī	1st additional star
Black Tortoise of the North (北方玄武)	牛	Niú	Ox	右旗	Yòuqí	Right Flag	21 Aql		右旗增二	Yòuqízēngèr	2nd additional star
Black Tortoise of the North (北方玄武)	牛	Niú	Ox	右旗	Yòuqí	Right Flag	27 Aql		右旗增三	Yòuqízēngsān	3rd additional star
Black Tortoise of the North (北方玄武)	牛	Niú	Ox	右旗	Yòuqí	Right Flag	35 Aql		右旗增四	Yòuqízēngsì	4th additional star
Black Tortoise of the North (北方玄武)	牛	Niú	Ox	右旗	Yòuqí	Right Flag	45 Aql		右旗增五	Yòuqízēngwǔ	5th additional star
Black Tortoise of the North (北方玄武)	牛	Niú	Ox	右旗	Yòuqí	Right Flag	36 Aql		右旗增七	Yòuqízēngqī	7th additional star
Black Tortoise of the North (北方玄武)	牛	Niú	Ox	右旗	Yòuqí	Right Flag	37 Aql		右旗增十	Yòuqízēngshí	10th additional star
Black Tortoise of the North (北方玄武)	牛	Niú	Ox	右旗	Yòuqí	Right Flag	51 Aql		右旗增十一	Yòuqízēngshíyī	11th additional star
Black Tortoise of the North (北方玄武)	牛	Niú	Ox	右旗	Yòuqí	Right Flag	57 Aql		右旗增十二	Yòuqízēngshíèr	12th additional star
Black Tortoise of the North (北方玄武)	牛	Niú	Ox	天桴	Tiānfú	Celestial Drumstick					
Black Tortoise of the North (北方玄武)	牛	Niú	Ox	天桴	Tiānfú	Celestial Drumstick	θ Aql	Antinous	天桴一	Tiānfúyī	1st star
Black Tortoise of the North (北方玄武)	牛	Niú	Ox	天桴	Tiānfú	Celestial Drumstick	62 Aql		天桴二	Tiānfúèr	2nd star
Black Tortoise of the North (北方玄武)	牛	Niú	Ox	天桴	Tiānfú	Celestial Drumstick	58 Aql		天桴三	Tiānfúsān	3rd star
Black Tortoise of the North (北方玄武)	牛	Niú	Ox	天桴	Tiānfú	Celestial Drumstick	η Aql	Pagru	天桴四	Tiānfúsì	4th star
Black Tortoise of the North (北方玄武)	牛	Niú	Ox	天桴	Tiānfú	Celestial Drumstick	64 Aql		天桴增一	Tiānfúzēngyī	1st additional star
Black Tortoise of the North (北方玄武)	牛	Niú	Ox	天桴	Tiānfú	Celestial Drumstick	66 Aql		天桴增二	Tiānfúzēngèr	2nd additional star
Black Tortoise of the North (北方玄武)	女	Nǚ	Girl	離珠	Lízhū	Pearls on Ladies' Wear					
Black Tortoise of the North (北方玄武)	女	Nǚ	Girl	離珠	Lízhū	Pearls on Ladies' Wear	70 Aql		離珠一	Lízhūyī	1st star
Black Tortoise of the North (北方玄武)	女	Nǚ	Girl	離珠	Lízhū	Pearls on Ladies' Wear	71 Aql		離珠二	Lízhūèr	2nd star
Black Tortoise of the North (北方玄武)	女	Nǚ	Girl	離珠	Lízhū	Pearls on Ladies' Wear	69 Aql		離珠四	Lízhūsì	4th star

== See also ==
- Traditional Chinese star names
- Chinese constellations
