= Delta Aquilae =

Binary star system in the constellation Aquila

- Location of δ Aquilae (circled) near the center

Observation data Epoch J2000 Equinox ICRS
- Constellation: Aquila
- Right ascension: 19^{h} 25^{m} 29.90139^{s}
- Declination: +03° 06′ 53.2061″
- Apparent magnitude (V): 3.365

Characteristics
- Spectral type: F0 IV + K
- U−B color index: +0.031
- B−V color index: +0.319
- R−I color index: +0.16
- Variable type: δ Sct

Astrometry
Radial velocity (R_{v})	−30.1 km/s
Proper motion (μ)	RA: +254.54 mas/yr Dec.: +82.51 mas/yr
Parallax (π)	64.41±1.00 mas
Distance	50.6 ± 0.8 ly (15.5 ± 0.2 pc)
Absolute magnitude (M_{V})	2.46

Orbit
Period (P)	3.426 ± 0.006 yr
Semi-major axis (a)	0.0539 ± 0.0040″
Eccentricity (e)	0.36 ± 0.07
Inclination (i)	150 ± 11°
Longitude of the node (Ω)	337 ± 9°
Periastron epoch (T)	1,954.58 ± 0.13
Argument of periastron (ω) (secondary)	191 ± 14°

Details

δ Aql Aa
Mass	1.65 M_{☉}
Radius	2.01±0.04 R_{☉}
Luminosity	8.52±0.26 L_{☉}
Surface gravity (log g)	4.03 cgs
Temperature	6,958 ± 46 K
Metallicity [Fe/H]	−0.04 dex
Rotational velocity (v sin i)	87.3 km/s

δ Aql Ab
Mass	0.67 M_{☉}
Radius	0.61 R_{☉}

Other designations
- Guqi, Al Mizān I, δ Aql, 30 Aql, BD+02°3879, FK5 730, GC 26816, GJ 760, HD 182640, HIP 95501, HR 7377, SAO 124603, PPM 167816, WDS J19255+0307A, NLTT 47775

Database references
SIMBAD	data

Delta Aquilae, also named Guqi, is a binary star system in the equatorial constellation of Aquila. Its Bayer designation is Latinized from δ Aquilae, and abbreviated Delta Aql or δ Aql. This system has an apparent visual magnitude of 3.4 and, based upon parallax measurements, is located at a distance of about 50.6 light-years (15.5 parsecs) from Earth. It is drifting closer with a radial velocity of −30 km/s. The system is predicted to come to within 25.4 ly (7.8 pc) of the Sun in around 335,000 years.

== Properties ==
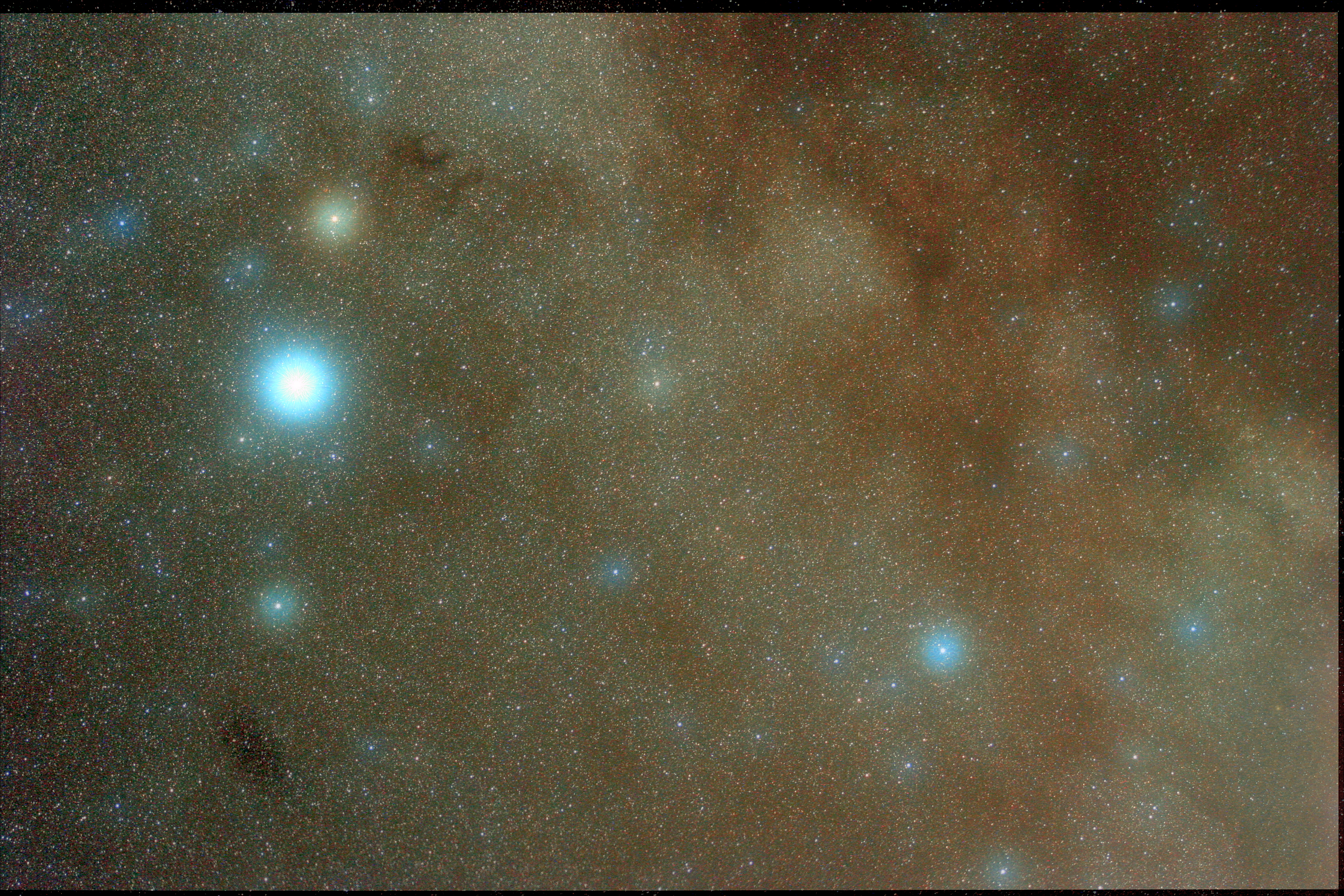
In this starfield showing many stars of Aquila constellation, δ Aquilae is visible at the right of the asterism α, β and γ Aquilae.

The binary nature of this system was first reported by H. L. Alden at Yale Observatory in 1936. It is an astrometric binary where the two components orbit each other with a period of 3.422 years and an eccentricity (ovalness) of about 0.36. This is a type of binary star system where the presence of the secondary component is revealed by its gravitational perturbation of the primary. The individual components have not been resolved with a telescope.

The primary member, designated component Aa, is an aging subgiant star with a stellar classification of F0 IV, where the luminosity class of IV indicates it is in the process of exhausting the supply of hydrogen at its core and evolving into a giant star. The mass of the star is 65% greater than the Sun's and it has expanded to more than double the Sun's radius. It is radiating around 8.5 times the luminosity of the Sun from its outer atmosphere at an effective temperature of 6,958 K, giving it the yellow-white hue of an F-type star. Delta Aquilae A is a Delta Scuti variable that exhibits variations in luminosity caused by pulsations in its outer envelope. It is spinning rapidly with a projected rotational velocity of about 87 km s^{−1}. This is a lower bound on the azimuthal velocity along the star's equator.

The secondary, component Ab, is a smaller star with about 67% of the Sun's mass and an estimated 61% of the radius of the Sun. It may be a K-type star.

== Naming ==
This star, along with η Aql and θ Aql were Al Mizān (ألميزان), the Scale-beam. According to the catalogue of stars in the Technical Memorandum 33-507 – A Reduced Star Catalog Containing 537 Named Stars, Al Mizān were the title for three stars: δ Aql as Al Mizān I, η Aql as Al Mizān II and θ Aql as Al Mizān III. Being the westernmost star of the asterism, Jim Kaler has suggested the name Almizan Occidental.

On the other hand, Antonín Bečvář includes, with no further explanation, Deneb Okab in his catalogue, meaning the tail of eagle in Arabic; however, the star is situated in the centre of the constellation, which is usually identified with the chest, while the stars ε Aql and ζ Aql have been collectively known as Deneb al Okab by Arabian medieval astronomers, which might suggest that Bečvář's assumption was a misnomer.

In the catalogue of stars in the Calendarium of Al Achsasi al Mouakket, this star was designated Djenubi Menkib al Nesr (منكب ألنسر ألخنوبي – mankib al-nasr al-janúbii), which was translated into Latin as Australior Humerus Vulturis, meaning the southern shoulder of the eagle.

In Chinese astronomy, 右旗 (Yòu Qí), meaning Right Flag, refers to an asterism consisting of δ Aquilae, μ Aquilae, σ Aquilae, ν Aquilae, ι Aquilae, 42 Aquilae, HD 184701, κ Aquilae and 56 Aquilae. Consequently, the Chinese name for δ Aquilae itself is 右旗三 (Yòu Qí sān, English: the Third Star of Right Flag). This asterism was alternatively called Gǔ Qí (Drum Flag, 鼓旗); the IAU Working Group on Star Names adopted the name Guqi for this star on 18 June 2026.

This star, together with η Aql, θ Aql, ι Aql, κ Aql and λ Aql, were once part of the now-obsolete constellation Antinous.
