= Kappa Aquilae =

Star in the constellation Aquila

κ Aquilae
- Location of κ Aquilae (circled)

Observation data Epoch J2000 Equinox J2000
- Constellation: Aquila
- Right ascension: 19^{h} 36^{m} 53.449^{s}
- Declination: −07° 01′ 38.92″
- Apparent magnitude (V): +4.957

Characteristics
- Spectral type: B0.5 III
- U−B color index: −0.861
- B−V color index: −0.028

Astrometry
Radial velocity (R_{v})	−19.4±4.2 km/s
Proper motion (μ)	RA: +0.974 mas/yr Dec.: −3.241 mas/yr
Parallax (π)	1.9758±0.1533 mas
Distance	1,700 ± 100 ly (510 ± 40 pc)
Absolute magnitude (M_{V})	−3.60

Details
Mass	15.50±0.61 M_{☉}
Radius	12.5 R_{☉}
Luminosity	52,630 L_{☉}
Surface gravity (log g)	3.5 cgs
Temperature	26,500 K
Metallicity [Fe/H]	−0.16 dex
Rotational velocity (v sin i)	265 km/s
Age	11.1±0.5 Myr

Other designations
- κ Aquilae, Kappa Aql, κ Aql, 39 Aquilae, BD−07 5006, FK5 737, GC 27107, HD 184915, HIP 96483, HR 7446, SAO 143600, PPM 203088

Database references
SIMBAD	data

Kappa Aquilae is a star in the equatorial constellation of Aquila. Its name is a Bayer designation that is Latinized from κ Aquilae, and abbreviated Kappa Aql or κ Aql. This is a faint star with an apparent visual magnitude of +4.957, which is bright enough to be seen with the naked eye in dark suburban skies. The annual parallax is only 1.98 mas, which equates to a distance of approximately 1,700 light-years (520 parsecs) from Earth (with a 6% margin of error).

The spectrum of Kappa Aquilae matches a stellar classification of B0.5 III, where the luminosity class of III is typically associated with evolved giant stars. It is spinning rapidly with a projected rotational velocity of 265 km/s and in the past has been classified as a Be star, despite the lack of an 'e' in the class. However, the weak emission is most likely coming from the outflow of a hot stellar wind rather than a decretion disk. This is a star with 15.50 times the Sun's mass and 12.5 times the radius of the Sun. Massive stars like this are luminous; it is radiating 52,630 times the Sun's luminosity from its outer atmosphere with an effective temperature of 26,500 K, giving it the intense blue-white glow of a B-type star. It is only 11 million years of age.

== Etymology ==
In Chinese, 右旗 (Yòu Qí), meaning Right Flag, refers to an asterism consisting of κ Aquilae, μ Aquilae, σ Aquilae, δ Aquilae, ν Aquilae, 42 Aquilae, ι Aquilae, HD 184701 and 56 Aquilae. Consequently, the Chinese name for κ Aquilae itself is 右旗八 (Yòu Qí bā, English: the Eighth Star of Right Flag.)

This star, together with η Aql, θ Aql, δ Aql, ι Aql and λ Aql were once part of the now-obsolete constellation Antinous.
