= Iota Aquilae =

Star in the constellation Aquila

- Location of ι Aquilae (circled)

Observation data Epoch J2000 Equinox J2000
- Constellation: Aquila
- Right ascension: 19^{h} 36^{m} 43.2777^{s}
- Declination: −01° 17′ 11.759″
- Apparent magnitude (V): 4.364

Characteristics
- Evolutionary stage: main sequence
- Spectral type: B5 III or B6 IV
- U−B color index: −0.428
- B−V color index: −0.083
- R−I color index: −0.08

Astrometry
Radial velocity (R_{v})	−21.34±3.63 km/s
Proper motion (μ)	RA: −1.426 mas/yr Dec.: −21.644 mas/yr
Parallax (π)	5.6673±0.1947 mas
Distance	580 ± 20 ly (176 ± 6 pc)
Absolute magnitude (M_{V})	−1.01

Details
Mass	4.8±0.3 M_{☉}
Radius	7.8±0.9 R_{☉}
Luminosity	851 L_{☉}
Surface gravity (log g)	3.64±0.05 cgs
Temperature	14,500±600 K
Metallicity [Fe/H]	0.09±0.04 dex
Rotational velocity (v sin i)	55 km/s
Age	100 ± 8 Myr

Other designations
- Al Thalimain, ι Aquilae, Iota Aql, ι Aql, 41 Aql, GC 27103, HD 184930, HIP 96468, HR 7447, SAO 143597, PPM 180738, WDS J19367-0117A

Database references
SIMBAD	data

Iota Aquilae is a star in the equatorial constellation of Aquila. Its identifier is a Bayer designation that is Latinized from ι Aquilae, and abbreviated Iota Aql or ι Aql. The star has the traditional name Al Thalimain, pronounced /ælˌθælɪˈmeɪn/, which it shares with λ Aquilae. The name is derived from the Arabic term الظليمین al-ẓalīmayn meaning "The Two Ostriches". With an apparent visual magnitude of 4.364, this star is bright enough to be seen with the naked eye. Based upon an annual parallax shift of 5.67±0.19 mas, it is located at a distance of around 580 light-years (180 parsecs) from Earth. The visual magnitude of the star is diminished by 0.15 from extinction caused by intervening gas and dust.

In 1968, this star was assigned a stellar classification of B5III, which suggests it has exhausted its hydrogen supply at its core and evolved into a blue giant. However, stellar models from 2002 indicate it is around 100 million years old and has thus far spent 91% of its allotted lifetime on the main sequence. In 2024, a study of standard stars suggested that Iota Aquilae be classified as B6 IV, matching a subgiant star.

Iota Aquilae has nearly five times the mass of the Sun and eight times the Sun's radius. It is emitting 851 times the luminosity of the Sun from its outer atmosphere at an effective temperature of 14,500 K, giving it the blue-white hue of a B-type star. The projected rotational velocity of this star is 55 km/s.

== Nomenclature ==
In Chinese, 右旗 (Yòu Qí), meaning Right Flag, refers to an asterism consisting of ι Aquilae, μ Aquilae, σ Aquilae, δ Aquilae, ν Aquilae, 42 Aquilae, HD 184701, κ Aquilae and 56 Aquilae. Consequently, the Chinese name for ι Aquilae itself is 右旗五 (Yòu Qí wu, English: the Fifth Star of Right Flag.)

This star, together with η Aql, θ Aql, δ Aql, κ Aql and λ Aql were once part of the obsolete constellation Antinous.
