= Al Thalimain =

The traditional star name Al Thalimain refers to two stars in the constellation Aquila:

- Iota Aquilae
- Lambda Aquilae

The name derives from the Arabic term aθ-θalīmain meaning "The two ostriches".
