= Theta Aquilae =

Binary star system in the constellation Aquila

- Location of θ Aquilae (circled)

Observation data Epoch J2000 Equinox ICRS
- Constellation: Aquila
- Right ascension: 20^{h} 11^{m} 18.28528^{s}
- Declination: −00° 49′ 17.2626″
- Apparent magnitude (V): 3.26

Characteristics
- Spectral type: B9.5 III + B9.5 III
- U−B color index: −0.15
- B−V color index: −0.07

Astrometry
Radial velocity (R_{v})	−27.3 km/s
Proper motion (μ)	RA: +35.26 mas/yr Dec.: +5.71 mas/yr
Parallax (π)	11.39±0.24 mas
Distance	286 ± 6 ly (88 ± 2 pc)
Absolute magnitude (M_{V})	−1.39/+0.14

Orbit
Period (P)	17.124281±0.000038 d
Semi-major axis (a)	3.148±0.002 mas
Eccentricity (e)	0.6040±0.0009
Inclination (i)	144.10±0.18°
Longitude of the node (Ω)	96.92±0.19°
Periastron epoch (T)	2458624.154±0.004 JD
Argument of periastron (ω) (primary)	33.73±0.22°
Semi-amplitude (K_{1}) (primary)	48.78±0.09 km/s
Semi-amplitude (K_{2}) (secondary)	63.48±0.11 km/s

Details

θ Aql A
Mass	3.564±0.049 M_{☉}
Radius	4.76±0.14 R_{☉}
Luminosity	229.8±22.5 L_{☉}
Surface gravity (log g)	3.64±0.02 cgs
Temperature	10,300±200 K
Metallicity [Fe/H]	+0.20 dex
Rotational velocity (v sin i)	36.3±0.4 km/s
Age	215 Myr

θ Aql B
Mass	2.739±0.037 M_{☉}
Radius	2.34±0.07 R_{☉}
Luminosity	54.0±5.8 L_{☉}
Surface gravity (log g)	4.14±0.02 cgs
Temperature	10,230±220 K
Rotational velocity (v sin i)	13.6±0.9 km/s

Other designations
- Antinous, Theta Aql, θ Aquilae, θ Aql, 65 Aql, BD−01 3911, FK5 756, GC 28010, HD 191692, HIP 99473, HR 7710, SAO 144150, PPM 180896, WDS J20113-0049A

Database references
SIMBAD	data

Theta Aquilae, also named Antinous, is a binary star in the equatorial constellation Aquila. Its identifier is a Bayer designation that is Latinized from θ Aquilae, and abbreviated Theta Aql or θ Aql. The combined apparent visual magnitude of the pair is 3.26, making it the fourth-brightest member of the constellation. This distance to this system can be determined through the parallax technique, yielding an estimate of roughly 286 light-years (88 parsecs) from Earth. It is drifting closer with a heliocentric radial velocity of −27 km/s.

== Properties ==
Theta Aquilae is a double-lined spectroscopic binary, which indicates that the individual components have not been viewed through a telescope; instead, what can be observed is their combined spectrum with the individual absorption line features shifting back and forth over the course of an orbit because of the Doppler effect. Their orbit has a period of 17.1 days with a large orbital eccentricity is 0.60. At the estimated distance of this system, the angular separation of 3.2 milliarcseconds corresponds to a physical separation of about 0.24–0.28 au.

A 2007 study classified both stars with a matching stellar classification of B9.5 III, suggesting that they are massive, B-type giant stars that have exhausted the supply of hydrogen at their cores and evolved away from the main sequence of stars like the Sun. Hummel et al. (1996) gave the primary component, θ Aql A, an estimated mass of 3.6 solar, a radius 4.8 the Sun's, and 278 the luminosity of the Sun. For the secondary component, θ Aql B, they give the corresponding parameters as 2.9 times the mass, 2.4 times the radius and 68 times the luminosity of the Sun.

Based upon their estimated parameters, Kaler (2008) suggests that θ Aql A is actually a subgiant star, while θ Aql B is a main sequence star. Adelman et al (2015) confirm the main sequence status of the secondary component, and find that it is a weak Am star with overabundances of zirconium and barium.

== Etymology ==
In Chinese, 天桴 (Tiān Fú), meaning Celestial Drumstick, refers to an asterism consisting of θ Aquilae, 62 Aquilae, 58 Aquilae and η Aquilae. Consequently, the Chinese name for θ Aquilae itself is 天桴一 (Tiān Fú yī, English: the First Star of Celestial Drumstick.) R. H. Allen's Star Names writes this name as Tseen Foo, applied specifically to θ Aquilae and translated as Heavenly Raft. (See also τ Aquilae.)

In the catalogue of stars in the Calendarium of Al Achsasi al Mouakket, this star was designated Thanih Ras al Akab (تاني ألرأس ألعقاب - taanii al ra’s alʕuqāb), which was translated into Latin as Secunda Capitis Vulturis, meaning the second (star) of eagle's head.

This star, along with δ Aql and η Aql, were Al Mizān (ألميزان), the Scale-beam. According to the catalogue of stars in the Technical Memorandum 33-507 - A Reduced Star Catalog Containing 537 Named Stars, Al Mizān were the title for three stars :δ Aql as Al Mizān I, η Aql as Al Mizān II and θ Aql as Al Mizān III.

This star, together with η Aql, δ Aql, ι Aql, κ Aql and λ Aql, constituted the obsolete constellation Antinous. The IAU Working Group on Star Names approved the name Antinous for Theta Aquilae A on 16 May 2024, after the obsolete constellation, and it is now so entered in the IAU Catalog of Star Names.
