= Eta Aquilae =

Multiple star in the constellation Aquila

η Aquilae
- Location of η Aql (circled)

Observation data Epoch J2000 Equinox ICRS
- Constellation: Aquila
- Right ascension: 19^{h} 52^{m} 28.369^{s}
- Declination: +01° 00′ 20.37″
- Apparent magnitude (V): 3.49–4.3

Characteristics
- Spectral type: F6 Iab (or F6Ib–G4Ib) + B9.8 V + A5V-F3V
- U−B color index: +0.51
- B−V color index: +0.89
- Variable type: δ Cep

Astrometry
Radial velocity (R_{v})	10.82±0.55 km/s
Proper motion (μ)	RA: +8.890 mas/yr Dec.: −8.322 mas/yr
Parallax (π)	3.6715±0.1942 mas
Distance	885.8+41.7 −45.0 ly (271.6+12.8 −13.8 pc)
Absolute magnitude (M_{V})	−3.70

Details

Aa
Mass	6.15+0.21 −0.41 M_{☉}
Radius	52.3+2.6 −2.3 R_{☉}
Luminosity	2,850±300 L_{☉}
Surface gravity (log g)	1.68–1.74 cgs
Temperature	5,412–6,313 K
Metallicity [Fe/H]	+0.08±0.08 dex
Age	150±50 Myr

Ab
Mass	2.3 M_{☉}

B
Mass	1.4–1.9 M_{☉}

Other designations
- Pagru, η Aql, 55 Aquilae, AAVSO 1947+00, BD+00°4337, FK5 746, GC 27517, HD 187929, HIP 97804, HR 7570, SAO 125159, PPM 168843, 2MASS J19522835+0100203

Database references
SIMBAD	data

Eta Aquilae, Latinized from η Aquilae now named Pagru, is a triple star system in the equatorial constellation of Aquila, the eagle. This star was once part of the former constellation Antinous. Its apparent visual magnitude varies between 3.49 and 4.3, making it one of the brighter members of Aquila. Based upon parallax measurements made by the Gaia spacecraft on its third data release (DR3), this star is located at a distance of approximately 272 parsecs (890 light-years). The primary component is a Classical Cepheid variable.

== Nomenclature ==
Eta Aquilae is a Bayer designation that is Latinized from η Aquilae, and abbreviated Eta Aql or η Aql. This star, together with θ Aql, δ Aql, ι Aql, κ Aql and λ Aql, was part of the obsolete constellation Antinous. An Akkadian antecedent of this constellation was Pagru, the corpse or dead man, attested in MUL.APIN. The IAU Working Group on Star Names adopted the name Pagru for Eta Aquilae Aa on 18 June 2026; the name Antinous was assigned to θ Aquilae A.

In Chinese, 天桴 (Tiān Fú), meaning Celestial Drumstick, refers to an asterism consisting of η Aquilae, θ Aquilae, 62 Aquilae and 58 Aquilae. Consequently, the Chinese name for η Aquilae itself is 天桴四 (Tiān Fú sì, English: the Fourth Star of Celestial Drumstick.)

This star, along with δ Aql and θ Aql, were Al Mizān (ألميزان), the Scale-beam. According to the catalogue of stars in the Technical Memorandum 33-507 - A Reduced Star Catalog Containing 537 Named Stars, Al Mizān was the title for three stars: δ Aql as Al Mizān I, η Aql as Al Mizān II and θ Aql as Al Mizān III.

== System ==
The η Aquilae system contains three stars. The primary star η Aql A is by far the brightest and dominates the spectrum. An ultraviolet excess in the spectral energy distribution suggest the presence of a faint hot companion, η Aql B, which has been fitted to a spectral type of B8.9 V. The fractional spectral type is an artefact of the mathematics used to model the spectrum, not an indication of any specific spectral features that would be intermediate between B8 and B9. A 2022 study using radial velocity measurements could not find a satisfactory fit for η Aql Ab's orbit, which suggests that it may be face-on, or very large. A 2024 study including archival observations did show a change in radial velocity, consistent with an orbital period of 50 years, although it is not known which of the stellar companions are responsible for the variations.

An outer stellar companion has been visually resolved at an angular separation of 0.7 arc seconds, corresponding to a projected separation of 191 astronomical units. The companion's absolute magnitude, assuming it to be a main sequence star, is consisent with a A5V-F3V spectral type and a mass of 1.4–1.9 M_{☉}. Measurements with the HST fine guidance sensors show variations likely to be due to orbital motion on a scale of two years, so the companion appears to be bound, making η Aql a triple system. The star was later shown to have shifted 4.1° over a timescale of 7.5 years, suggesting an orbital period of at least 659 years.

At Eta Aquilae's distance (272 pc), its apparent brightness is diminished by 0.74 magnitudes due to extinction caused by interstellar dust between Earth and the star.

== Cepheid variable ==
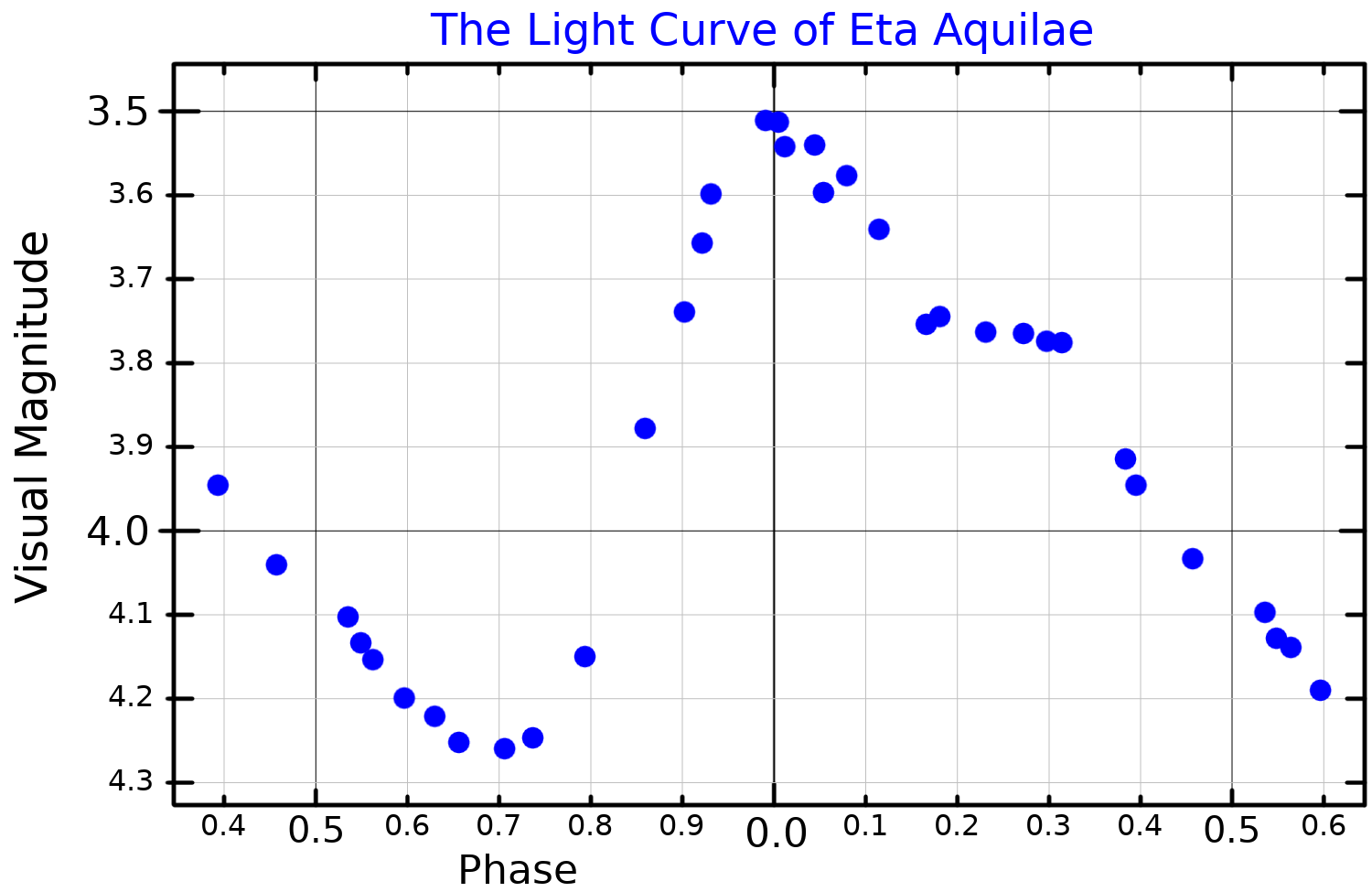
A visual band light curve for η Aquilae, adapted from Kiss (1998)

η Aquilae A is a Cepheid variable star, discovered by Edward Pigott in 1784. It has an apparent magnitude that ranges from 3.49 to 4.3 over a period of 7.177 days. Along with Delta Cephei, Zeta Geminorum and Beta Doradus, it is one of the most prominent naked eye Cepheids; that is, both the star itself and the variation in its brightness can be distinguished with the naked eye. Some other Cepheids such as Polaris are bright but have only a very small variation in brightness.

This massive star, being 100–200 million years old, has burned through the hydrogen fuel at its core and evolved into a supergiant, giving it a baseline stellar classification of F6 Iab. The periodic pulsations of this star actually cause the stellar class to vary between F6.5Ib to G2Ib over the course of each cycle.

Compared to the Sun, Eta Aquilae has around six times the mass, 52 times the radius, and is radiating 2,850 times as much luminosity. This energy is being emitted from the outer envelope at an effective temperature which varies between 5,410 and 6,310 K, giving it the yellow-whitish hued glow of a G-type star. The radius of the star varies by 4.59×10^{6} km (6.5 R_{☉}) over the course of a pulsation cycle. Compared to stars in its neighborhood, this star has a high peculiar velocity of 16.7±6.9 km s^{−1}.
