= 7 Aquilae =

Star in the constellation Aquila

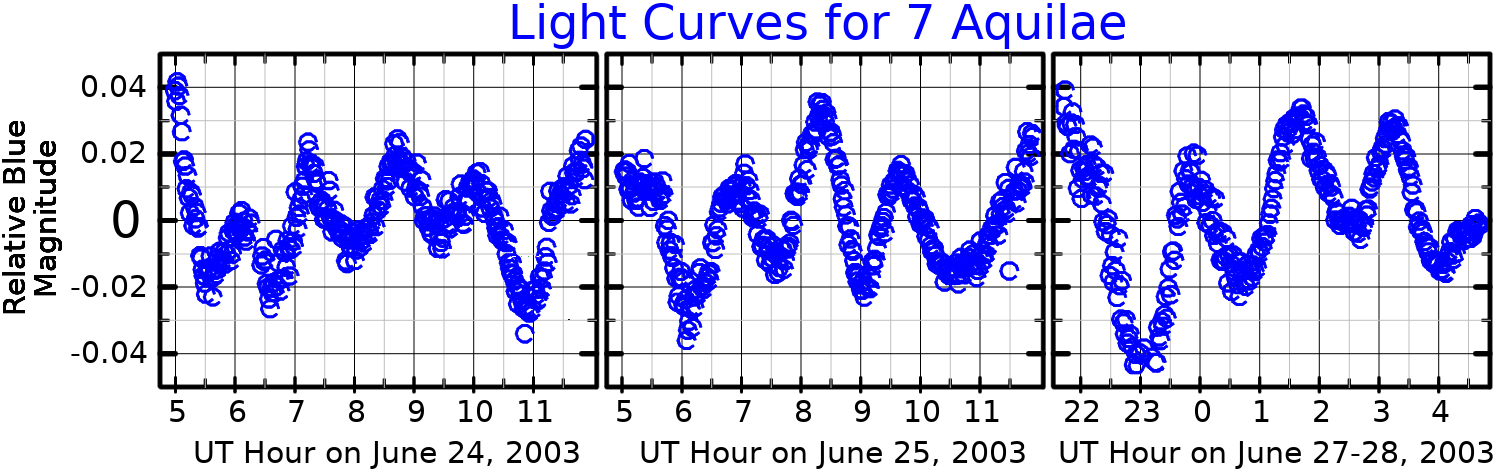
- A blue band light curve for 7 Aquilae, adapted from Machado et al. (2007)

Observation data Epoch J2000 Equinox ICRS
- Constellation: Aquila
- Right ascension: 18^{h} 51^{m} 05.40849^{s}
- Declination: −03° 15′ 40.0050″
- Apparent magnitude (V): 6.894

Characteristics
- Evolutionary stage: main sequence
- Spectral type: F0V or F0IV
- B−V color index: +0.285
- Variable type: δ Sct

Astrometry
Radial velocity (R_{v})	−20.65 km/s
Proper motion (μ)	RA: −46.266 mas/yr Dec.: −59.024 mas/yr
Parallax (π)	9.0793±0.0286 mas
Distance	359 ± 1 ly (110.1 ± 0.3 pc)
Absolute magnitude (M_{V})	1.22

Details
Mass	2.05 M_{☉}
Radius	2.73 R_{☉}
Luminosity	24 L_{☉}
Surface gravity (log g)	3.62 cgs
Temperature	7,257 K
Metallicity [Fe/H]	0.01 dex
Rotational velocity (v sin i)	32 km/s
Age	1.17 Gyr

Other designations
- 7 Aql, V1728 Aql, BD−03°4390, HD 174532, HIP 92501, SAO 142696

Database references
SIMBAD	data

7 Aquilae is a star in the equatorial constellation of Aquila, located 359 light years away from the Sun. 7 Aquilae is the Flamsteed designation. It is visible to the naked eye as a faint, yellow-white hued star with a baseline apparent visual magnitude of 6.9. The star is moving closer to the Earth with a heliocentric radial velocity of −21 km/s.

Houk and Swift (1999) find a stellar classification of F0IV, matching an F-type subgiant star that has exhausted the hydrogen at its core and is evolving into a giant. Fox Machado et al. (2010) found a class of F0V, suggesting it is still a main sequence star. Ennio Poretti et al. discovered 7 Aquilae is a variable star while searching for targets to be observed by the CoRoT satellite, and published their discovery in 2003. It is a pulsating variable star of the Delta Scuti type. It has double the mass of the Sun and 2.7 times the Sun's radius. The detection of an infrared excess suggests a debris disk with a mean temperature of 140 K is orbiting about 16.30 AU away from the host star.
