= 5 Aquilae =

Quadruple star system in the constellation of Aquila

Observation data Epoch J2000 Equinox ICRS
- Constellation: Aquila
- System
- Right ascension: 18^{h} 46^{m} 28.58278^{s}
- Declination: −00° 57′ 41.9006″
- Apparent magnitude (V): 5.90
- A
- Right ascension: 18^{h} 46^{m} 28.59383^{s}
- Declination: −00° 57′ 42.0929″
- Apparent magnitude (V): 5.92
- B
- Right ascension: 18^{h} 46^{m} 29.31926^{s}
- Declination: −00° 57′ 48.5977″
- Apparent magnitude (V): 7.65

Characteristics
- Spectral type: A2 Vm + ? + F3 Vm
- U−B color index: +0.12
- B−V color index: +0.131

Astrometry
Radial velocity (R_{v})	+17.4 km/s
Proper motion (μ)	RA: +20.44 mas/yr Dec.: −21.54 mas/yr
Parallax (π)	8.94±1.14 mas
Distance	approx. 360 ly (approx. 110 pc)

Orbit
Primary	5 Aql Aa
Name	5 Aql Ab
Period (P)	33.65±0.78 yr
Semi-major axis (a)	0.219±0.016″
Eccentricity (e)	0.333±0.054
Inclination (i)	97.9±1.4°
Longitude of the node (Ω)	174.3±1.9°
Periastron epoch (T)	1989.71±0.76
Argument of periastron (ω) (secondary)	251.7±5.9°

Details
Rotational velocity (v sin i)	71 km/s

Other designations
- BD−01 3559, HD 173654, HR 7059, WDS 18465-0058
- 5 Aql A: HIP 92117, SAO 142606
- 5 Aql B: HIP 92118, SAO 142607

Database references
SIMBAD	5 Aql
- 5 Aql A
- 5 Aql B

5 Aquilae (abbreviated 5 Aql) is a quadruple star system in the constellation of Aquila. 5 Aquilae is the Flamsteed designation. The combined apparent visual magnitude of the system is 5.9, which means it is faintly visible to the naked eye. With an annual parallax shift of 8.94 mas, the distance to this system is estimated as approximately 360 light-years (110 parsecs), albeit with a 13% margin of error.

Two of the components of this system, 5 Aquilae Aa and Ab, are Am stars. That is, they are chemically peculiar stars that show unusual abundances of elements other than hydrogen and helium. The two orbit each other with a period lasting 33.65 years at an eccentricity of 0.33. One of these stars is itself a close spectroscopic binary, with a 4.765 day period and a nearly circular orbit that has an eccentricity of just 0.02. The fourth component, 5 Aquilae B, is a magnitude 7.65 F-type main sequence star with a stellar classification of F3 Vm. It is at an angular separation of 12.71 arcseconds from the other members of the system.
