= 69 Aquilae =

Star in the constellation Aquila

- Location of 69 Aquilae (circled in red)

Observation data Epoch J2000 Equinox J2000
- Constellation: Aquila
- Right ascension: 20^{h} 29^{m} 38.99995^{s}
- Declination: −02° 53′ 07.9176″
- Apparent magnitude (V): 4.91

Characteristics
- Evolutionary stage: red clump
- Spectral type: K1/2 III
- B−V color index: 1.162

Astrometry
Radial velocity (R_{v})	−22.51±0.16 km/s
Proper motion (μ)	RA: +70.355 mas/yr Dec.: −21.523 mas/yr
Parallax (π)	16.2388±0.2271 mas
Distance	201 ± 3 ly (61.6 ± 0.9 pc)
Absolute magnitude (M_{V})	0.97

Details
Mass	1.54 M_{☉}
Radius	11 R_{☉}
Luminosity	45.7 L_{☉}
Surface gravity (log g)	2.5 cgs
Temperature	4,529±5 K
Metallicity [Fe/H]	0.03 dex
Rotational velocity (v sin i)	4.0 km/s
Age	3.44 Gyr

Other designations
- 69 Aql, BD−03°4918, HD 195135, HIP 101101, HR 7831, SAO 144495

Database references
SIMBAD	data

69 Aquilae, abbreviated 69 Aql, is a star in the equatorial constellation of Aquila. 69 Aquilae is its Flamsteed designation. It is visible to the naked eye with an apparent visual magnitude of 4.91. Based upon an annual parallax shift of 16.2 mas, it is located 201 light years away. The star is moving closer to the Earth with a heliocentric radial velocity of −22.5 km/s.

The stellar classification of 69 Aquilae is K1/2 III, which means this is an evolved giant star. It belongs to a sub-category called the red clump, indicating that it is on the horizontal branch and is generating energy through helium fusion at its core. The star is about 3.4 billion years old with 1.54 times the mass of the Sun and has expanded to 11 times the Sun's radius. It is radiating 45.7 times the Sun's luminosity from its enlarged photosphere at an effective temperature of 4,529 K.
