= 21 Aquilae =

Star in the constellation Aquila

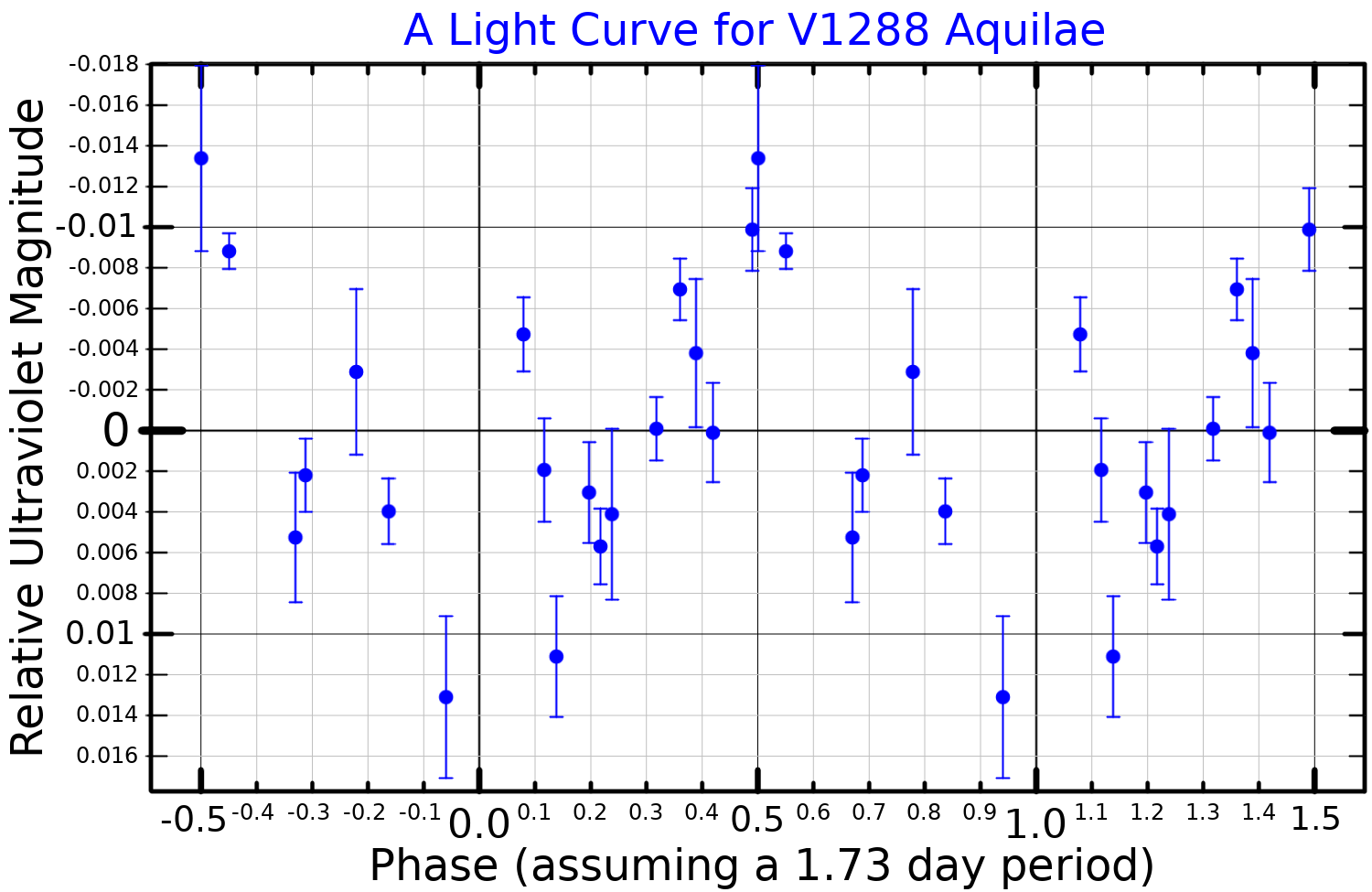
- An ultraviolet band light curve for V1288 Aquilae, adapted from Veto (1980)

Observation data Epoch J2000 Equinox ICRS
- Constellation: Aquila
- Right ascension: 19^{h} 13^{m} 42.70120^{s}
- Declination: +02° 17′ 37.3103″
- Apparent magnitude (V): 5.06 - 5.16

Characteristics
- Spectral type: B8II-III(Hg?)
- U−B color index: −0.399
- B−V color index: −0.065
- Variable type: α^{2} CVn

Astrometry
Radial velocity (R_{v})	−5.2 km/s
Proper motion (μ)	RA: +10.102 mas/yr Dec.: −0.825 mas/yr
Parallax (π)	4.7730±0.1052 mas
Distance	680 ± 20 ly (210 ± 5 pc)
Absolute magnitude (M_{V})	−2.12

Details
Mass	6.7 M_{☉}
Radius	6.2 R_{☉}
Luminosity	704 L_{☉}
Surface gravity (log g)	3.95 cgs
Temperature	12,014 K
Metallicity [Fe/H]	−0.20 dex
Rotation	9.3 d
Rotational velocity (v sin i)	17 km/s
Age	165 Myr

Other designations
- 21 Aql, V1288 Aql, BD+02°3824, FK5 3537, HD 179761, HIP 94477, HR 7287, SAO 124408, WDS J19137+0218A

Database references
SIMBAD	data

21 Aquilae is a solitary variable star in the equatorial constellation of Aquila. It has the variable star designation V1288 Aql; 21 Aquilae is its Flamsteed designation. This object is visible to the naked eye as a dim, blue-white hued star with a baseline apparent visual magnitude of about 5.1. The star is located at a distance of around 680 light-years (210 parsecs) from Earth, give or take a 20 light-year margin of error. It is moving closer to the Earth with a heliocentric radial velocity of –5 km/s.

In 1962, Helmut A. Abt and John C. Gloson published data showing that 21 Aquilae was a variable star. Based on that publication, the star was given its variable star designation in 1972.

The stellar classification of this star is B8 II-III, with the luminosity class of II-III suggesting that the spectrum displays elements of both a giant star and a bright giant. It is a chemically peculiar star of the Mercury-Manganese type (CP3), although some catalogues consider that status to be doubtful. This is a probable Alpha^{2} Canum Venaticorum variable that ranges in visual magnitude from 5.06 down to 5.16. The star is radiating 704 times the luminosity of the Sun from its photosphere at an effective temperature of 12,014 K; this gives it the blue-white glow of a B-type star.

21 Aquilae is catalogued as an optical double star, having a 12th magnitude companion 37″ away as of 2010. It was first identified as a double star by John Herschel. The companion is a distant background object.
