= 22 Aquilae =

Star in the constellation Aquila

Observation data Epoch J2000 Equinox ICRS
- Constellation: Aquila
- Right ascension: 19^{h} 16^{m} 31.03180^{s}
- Declination: +04° 50′ 05.2523″
- Apparent magnitude (V): 5.59

Characteristics
- Spectral type: A1 V or A3 IV
- B−V color index: 0.101±0.006

Astrometry
| Radial velocity (R_{v}) | −22.8±4.3 km/s |
| Proper motion (μ) | RA: +14.306 mas/yr Dec.: –11.083 mas/yr |
| Parallax (π) | 4.7392±0.0910 mas |
| Distance | 690 ± 10 ly (211 ± 4 pc) |
| Absolute magnitude (M_{V}) | −0.48 |

Details
| Mass | 2.89±0.11 M_{☉} |
| Radius | 7.0 R_{☉} |
| Luminosity | 161+27 −23 L_{☉} |
| Temperature | 8453±78 K |
| Rotational velocity (v sin i) | 70 km/s |
| Age | 370 Myr |

Other designations
- 22 Aql, AG+04 2489, BD+04°4045, GC 26567, HD 180482, HIP 94727, HR 7303, SAO 143134, 2MASS J19163102+0450052

Database references
| SIMBAD | data |

22 Aquilae, abbreviated 22 Aql, is a star in the equatorial constellation of Aquila. 22 Aquilae is its Flamsteed designation. It is a faint star but visible to the naked eye with an apparent visual magnitude of 5.59. The distance to 22 Aql can be estimated from its annual parallax shift of 4.74 mas, which yields a separation of 690 light years. It is moving closer to the Earth with a heliocentric radial velocity of −23 km/s.

Cowley et al. (1969) assigned this star a stellar classification of A3 IV, matching an evolving subgiant star that has exhausted the hydrogen at its core. Houk and Swift (1999) reassigned it as an A-type main-sequence star with a class of A1 V. It has nearly three times the mass of the Sun and is spinning with a projected rotational velocity of 70 km/s. The star is radiating 161 times the Sun's luminosity from its photosphere at an effective temperature of 8,453 K.
