= 45 Aquilae =

Star in the constellation Aquila

Observation data Epoch J2000 Equinox ICRS
- Constellation: Aquila
- Right ascension: 19^{h} 40^{m} 43.31912^{s}
- Declination: −00° 37′ 16.3868″
- Apparent magnitude (V): 5.656 (5.9 + 7.6)

Characteristics
- Evolutionary stage: main sequence
- Spectral type: A3 IV
- U−B color index: +0.09
- B−V color index: +0.11

Astrometry
Radial velocity (R_{v})	−46 km/s
Proper motion (μ)	RA: +15.683 mas/yr Dec.: +5.323 mas/yr
Parallax (π)	9.3151±0.1561 mas
Distance	350 ± 6 ly (107 ± 2 pc)
Absolute magnitude (M_{V})	0.49

Orbit
Primary	5 Aql Aa
Name	5 Aql Ab
Period (P)	20.31±0.17 yr
Semi-major axis (a)	0.0850±0.0020″
Eccentricity (e)	0.054±0.047
Inclination (i)	158.3±7.9°
Longitude of the node (Ω)	202.0±15.0°
Periastron epoch (T)	1996.06±0.92
Argument of periastron (ω) (secondary)	346.0±25.0°

Details

45 Aql Aa
Mass	2.63±0.10 M_{☉}
Luminosity	75.8+13.8 −11.7 L_{☉}
Temperature	9,016+167 −165 K
Rotational velocity (v sin i)	75 km/s

Other designations
- 45 Aql, BD−00°3813, FK5 3573, HD 185762, HIP 96807, HR 7480, SAO 14367, WDS J19407-0037

Database references
SIMBAD	data

45 Aquilae, abbreviated 45 Aql, is a triple star system in the equatorial constellation of Aquila. 45 Aquilae is its Flamsteed designation. It is located 350 light-years (110 parsecs) away from Earth, give or take a 6 light-year margin of error, and has a combined apparent visual magnitude of 5.7. The system is moving closer to the Earth with a heliocentric radial velocity of -46 km/s.

Based upon a stellar classification of A3 IV, the primary component of this system is a subgiant star that is in the process of evolving away from the main sequence. The star has 2.6 times the mass of the Sun and is spinning with a projected rotational velocity of 75 km/s. It has an orbiting companion with a period of 20.31 years and an eccentricity of 0.054. At an angular separation of 42.2 arcseconds from this pair is a 12.7 magnitude tertiary companion.
