= Upsilon Aquilae =

Star in the constellation Aquila

- Location of υ Aquilae (circled)

Observation data Epoch J2000 Equinox ICRS
- Constellation: Aquila
- Right ascension: 19^{h} 45^{m} 39.947^{s}
- Declination: +07° 36′ 47.37″
- Apparent magnitude (V): +5.889

Characteristics
- Evolutionary stage: main sequence
- Spectral type: A3 IV
- U−B color index: +0.09
- B−V color index: +0.18

Astrometry
Radial velocity (R_{v})	−29.9±2.0 km/s
Proper motion (μ)	RA: +53.593 mas/yr Dec.: −0.223 mas/yr
Parallax (π)	18.884±0.0408 mas
Distance	172.7 ± 0.4 ly (53.0 ± 0.1 pc)
Absolute magnitude (M_{V})	+2.24

Details
Mass	1.68 M_{☉}
Luminosity	10.5 L_{☉}
Surface gravity (log g)	4.21 cgs
Temperature	7,906 K
Metallicity [Fe/H]	−0.05 dex
Rotational velocity (v sin i)	22.5 km/s
Age	361±308 Myr

Other designations
- υ Aql, 49 Aquilae, BD+07°4210, GC 27342, HD 186689, HIP 97229, HR 7519, SAO 125032, PPM 168596

Database references
SIMBAD	data

Upsilon Aquilae is a star in the equatorial constellation of Aquila. Its name is a Bayer designation that is Latinized from υ Aquilae, and abbreviated Upsilon Aql or υ Aql. With an apparent visual magnitude of +5.91 it is a faint star but, according to the Bortle Dark-Sky Scale, it is visible to the naked eye from suburban skies. It has an annual parallax shift of 18.9 mas, indicating a distance of 173 light-years (53 parsecs). The star is drifting closer with a radial velocity of −30 km/s.

This is a subgiant star with a stellar classification of A3 IV. The outer atmosphere is radiating energy into space with 10.5 times the Sun's luminosity from its photosphere at an effective temperature of 7,906 K, which gives it the white-hot glow of an A-type star. It is 361 million years old with 1.68 times the mass of the Sun and has a relatively high rate of spin with a projected rotational velocity of 22.5 km/s. An infrared excess has been reported, although no circumstellar disk has been resolved.
