= 36 Aquilae =

Star in the constellation Aquila

- Location of 36 Aquilae (circled)

Observation data Epoch J2000 Equinox ICRS
- Constellation: Aquila
- Right ascension: 19^{h} 30^{m} 39.83606^{s}
- Declination: −02° 47′ 19.9944″
- Apparent magnitude (V): 5.02

Characteristics
- Evolutionary stage: AGB
- Spectral type: K5 III
- U−B color index: +2.03
- B−V color index: +1.75

Astrometry
Radial velocity (R_{v})	−10.38±0.55 km/s
Proper motion (μ)	RA: +20.64 mas/yr Dec.: −10.63 mas/yr
Parallax (π)	6.17±0.30 mas
Distance	530 ± 30 ly (162 ± 8 pc)
Absolute magnitude (M_{V})	−1.01

Details
Mass	1.1 M_{☉}
Radius	75 R_{☉}
Luminosity	927 L_{☉}
Temperature	3,576 K
Metallicity [Fe/H]	0.09 dex

Other designations
- BD−03°4612, FK5 1509, HD 183630, HIP 95937, HR 7414, SAO 143482

Database references
SIMBAD	data

36 Aquilae (abbreviated 36 Aql) is a star in the equatorial constellation of Aquila. 36 Aquilae is its Flamsteed designation though it also bears the Bayer designation e Aquilae. With an apparent visual magnitude of 5.02, this star is faintly visible to the naked eye. It has an annual parallax shift of 6.17 mas, indicating a physical distance of 530 light-years (160 parsecs) with a 30 light-year margin of error.

The spectrum of this star matches a stellar classification of K5 III. It is a red giant star with 54 75 times the radius of the Sun that is currently on the asymptotic giant branch. This means the star is generating energy by the fusion of hydrogen along an outer shell and helium along a concentric inner shell, surrounding an inert core of carbon and oxygen. 36 Aquilae undergoes small, periodic variations in luminosity, changing by 0.0063 magnitudes about 11.5 times per day, or once every 2 hours and 5.2 minutes.
