= 46 Aquilae =

Star in the constellation Aquila

Observation data Epoch J2000 Equinox ICRS
- Constellation: Aquila
- Right ascension: 19^{h} 42^{m} 12.81234^{s}
- Declination: +12° 11′ 35.7407″
- Apparent magnitude (V): 6.33

Characteristics
- Evolutionary stage: main sequence
- Spectral type: B9III
- U−B color index: −0.42
- B−V color index: −0.077±0.004

Astrometry
Radial velocity (R_{v})	−24.7±1.6 km/s
Proper motion (μ)	RA: −0.422 mas/yr Dec.: −8.319 mas/yr
Parallax (π)	4.0515±0.0410 mas
Distance	805 ± 8 ly (247 ± 2 pc)
Absolute magnitude (M_{V})	−0.32

Details
Mass	3.6 M_{☉}
Radius	4.2 R_{☉}
Luminosity	268 L_{☉}
Surface gravity (log g)	3.78 cgs
Temperature	11,773 K
Metallicity [Fe/H]	0.50 dex
Rotation	9.3 days
Rotational velocity (v sin i)	3.0 km/s
Age	176 Myr

Other designations
- 46 Aql, BD+11°3954, GC 27263, HD 186122, HIP 96931, HR 7493, SAO 105156

Database references
SIMBAD	data

46 Aquilae is a star in the constellation of Aquila, located to the north of Tarazed (γ Aquilae). 46 Aquilae is its Flamsteed designation. It is a dim, blue-white hued star that is a challenge to view with the naked eye, having an apparent visual magnitude of 6.33. This object is located approximately 805 light years from the Sun, based on parallax. It is moving closer to the Earth with a heliocentric radial velocity of −25 km/s.

This body has a stellar classification of B9 III, matching a late B-type giant star. It is a chemically peculiar star of a weak mercury-manganese type (CP3), and is the most chromium–deficient star known. The star may possess a magnetic field with a strength greater than 2 kG. It is radiating 268 times the luminosity of the Sun from its photosphere at an effective temperature of 12,900 K.
