= 4 Aquilae =

Star in the constellation Aquila

- Location of 4 Aquilae (circled in red)

Observation data Epoch J2000 Equinox ICRS
- Constellation: Aquila
- Right ascension: 18^{h} 44^{m} 49.93813^{s}
- Declination: +02° 03′ 36.1381″
- Apparent magnitude (V): 5.02

Characteristics
- Spectral type: B9 V
- B−V color index: −0.055±0.016

Astrometry
Radial velocity (R_{v})	−13.0±4.2 km/s
Proper motion (μ)	RA: +9.347 mas/yr Dec.: −14.719 mas/yr
Parallax (π)	6.7299±0.2433 mas
Distance	480 ± 20 ly (149 ± 5 pc)
Absolute magnitude (M_{V})	−0.75

Details
Mass	3.60±0.06 M_{☉}
Radius	3.00 R_{☉}
Luminosity	294+20.4 −20.9 L_{☉}
Surface gravity (log g)	3.46±0.10 cgs
Temperature	10,965+50 −51 K
Rotational velocity (v sin i)	259 km/s

Other designations
- 4 Aql, AG+02 2306, BD+01°3766, GC 25652, HD 173370, HIP 91975, HR 7040, SAO 123879

Database references
SIMBAD	data

4 Aquilae, abbreviated 4 Aql, is a single, white-hued star in the equatorial constellation of Aquila. 4 Aquilae is the Flamsteed designation. It has an apparent visual magnitude of 5.02, making it a faint star visible to the naked eye. The distance to 4 Aql can be estimated from its annual parallax shift of 6.7 mas, yielding an estimated range of around 480 light years. It is moving closer to the Earth with a heliocentric radial velocity of −13 km/s.

This is a B-type main-sequence star with a stellar classification of B9 V. It was classed as a Be star by Arne Sletteback in 1982, indicating it has ionized circumstellar gas. The star is spinning rapidly, showing a projected rotational velocity of 259 km/s, and is being viewed almost equator-on. It has 3.6 times the mass of the Sun and 3 times the Sun's radius. The star is radiating 294 times the Sun's luminosity from its photosphere at an effective temperature of 10,965 K.
