= 37 Aquilae =

Star in the constellation Aquila

Observation data Epoch J2000 Equinox J2000
- Constellation: Aquila
- Right ascension: 19^{h} 35^{m} 07.25785^{s}
- Declination: −10° 33′ 37.5936″
- Apparent magnitude (V): 5.12

Characteristics
- Evolutionary stage: red giant branch
- Spectral type: G8 IIIa
- B−V color index: 1.122

Astrometry
Radial velocity (R_{v})	−30.17±0.13 km/s
Proper motion (μ)	RA: +7.724 mas/yr Dec.: –2.801 mas/yr
Parallax (π)	7.1549±0.0867 mas
Distance	456 ± 6 ly (140 ± 2 pc)
Absolute magnitude (M_{V})	−0.61

Details
Mass	2.30±0.43 M_{☉}
Radius	23.38±1.17 R_{☉}
Luminosity	218.6±21.2 L_{☉}
Surface gravity (log g)	2.07±0.09 cgs
Temperature	4,594±30 K
Metallicity [Fe/H]	−0.16±0.10 dex
Rotational velocity (v sin i)	8.88 km/s
Age	1.20±0.82 Gyr

Other designations
- 37 Aql, BD−10°5122, FK5 3562, GC 27046, HD 184492, HIP 96327, HR 7430, SAO 162792, PPM 236209

Database references
SIMBAD	data

37 Aquilae, abbreviated 37 Aql, is a star in the equatorial constellation of Aquila. 37 Aquilae is its Flamsteed designation. It has an apparent visual magnitude of approximately 5.12, which is bright enough to be visible to the naked eye. The distance to 37 Aql can be estimated from its annual parallax shift of 7.2 mas, yielding a range of 456 light years. The star is moving closer to the Earth with a heliocentric radial velocity of −30 km/s, and is predicted to come to within 72 light-years in around 4.4 million years.

This is an aging giant star with a stellar classification of G8 IIIa. It is uncertain whether this star is on the red giant branch or the horizontal branch; Reffert et al. (2015) give 57% odd that it is the latter. In that case, their model shows an estimated age of 1.2 billion years with 2.3 times the mass of the Sun and 23 times the Sun's radius. It is radiating 219 times the Sun's luminosity from its enlarged photosphere at an effective temperature of 4,594 K. These coordinates are a source of X-ray emission, which is most likely coming from the star.
