= 71 Aquilae =

Binary star system in the constellation Aquila

- Location of 71 Aquilae (circled)

Observation data Epoch J2000 Equinox J2000
- Constellation: Aquila
- Right ascension: 20^{h} 38^{m} 20.28206^{s}
- Declination: −01° 06′ 18.4311″
- Apparent magnitude (V): 4.33

Characteristics
- Spectral type: G7.5 IIIa
- U−B color index: +0.68
- B−V color index: +0.96
- R−I color index: 0.46

Astrometry
Radial velocity (R_{v})	−5.6 km/s
Proper motion (μ)	RA: +14.84 mas/yr Dec.: −16.45 mas/yr
Parallax (π)	9.67±0.75 mas
Distance	340 ± 30 ly (103 ± 8 pc)
Absolute magnitude (M_{V})	−1.03

Orbit
Period (P)	205.2 days
Semi-major axis (a)	3.82±0.81 mas
Eccentricity (e)	0.000
Inclination (i)	147.70±5.90°
Longitude of the node (Ω)	314.00±1.30°
Periastron epoch (T)	2423358.0 HJD
Argument of periastron (ω) (secondary)	0.00°

Details

primary
Mass	3.6 M_{☉}
Radius	16.7 R_{☉}
Luminosity	162 L_{☉}
Surface gravity (log g)	2.77 cgs
Temperature	5,046 K
Metallicity [Fe/H]	−0.03 dex
Rotational velocity (v sin i)	10 km/s
Age	347 Myr

secondary
Mass	0.88 M_{☉}

Other designations
- BD−01 4016, HD 196574, HIP 101847, HR 7884, SAO 144649.

Database references
SIMBAD	data

71 Aquilae (abbreviated 71 Aql) is a binary star in the equatorial constellation of Aquila. 71 Aquilae is its Flamsteed designation though it also bears the Bayer designation l Aquilae. The apparent visual magnitude of the system is 4.33, making it bright enough to be viewed by the naked eye. It has an annual parallax shift of 9.67 mas, which equates to a physical distance of 340 light-years (100 parsecs) from Earth, give or take a 30 light-year margin of error. At this distance, the brightness of the system is diminished by 0.065 in visual magnitude from extinction caused by interstellar gas and dust.

This is a spectroscopic binary system where the presence of an orbiting companion is revealed by shifts in the spectral lines caused by the Doppler effect. The primary component is a giant star with a stellar classification of G7.5 IIIa and is listed as a standard star for that class. The secondary is following a circular orbit with a period of 205.2 days.
