= 35 Aquilae =

Star in the constellation Aquila

- Location of 35 Aquilae (circled)

Observation data Epoch J2000 Equinox ICRS
- Constellation: Aquila
- Right ascension: 19^{h} 29^{m} 00.98694^{s}
- Declination: +01° 57′ 01.6168″
- Apparent magnitude (V): 5.80

Characteristics
- Evolutionary stage: main sequence
- Spectral type: A0 V
- U−B color index: +0.07
- B−V color index: +0.08
- Variable type: δ Sct

Astrometry
| Radial velocity (R_{v}) | +12 km/s |
| Proper motion (μ) | RA: −2.892 mas/yr Dec.: −32.443 mas/yr |
| Parallax (π) | 16.5652±0.0430 mas |
| Distance | 196.9 ± 0.5 ly (60.4 ± 0.2 pc) |

Details
| Mass | 2.38 M_{☉} |
| Radius | 1.55 R_{☉} |
| Luminosity | 17 L_{☉} |
| Surface gravity (log g) | 4.43 cgs |
| Temperature | 9,376 K |
| Metallicity [Fe/H] | −1.30±0.50 dex |
| Rotational velocity (v sin i) | 110 km/s |
| Age | 448 Myr |

Other designations
- V1431 Aquilae, AG+01°2294, BD+01°4010, GCRV 11908, HD 183324, HIP 95793, HR 7400, SAO 124675

Database references
| SIMBAD | data |

35 Aquilae (abbreviated 35 Aql) is a star in the equatorial constellation of Aquila. 35 Aquilae is its Flamsteed designation though it also bears the Bayer designation c Aquilae. The apparent visual magnitude of this star is 5.8, which means it is a faint star but visible to the naked eye from dark suburban or rural skies. It has an annual parallax shift of 16.34 mas that is caused by the Earth's orbit around the Sun. This yields a distance estimate of 200 light-years (61 parsecs), give or take a 4 light-year margin of error. At this distance, the visual magnitude is diminished by 0.26 from extinction caused by interstellar gas and dust.

The spectrum of 35 Aquilae fits a stellar classification of A0 V, indicating it is an A-type main sequence star. Compared to the Sun, it has 238% of its mass and 155% of its radius. As such, it is much brighter than the Sun, emitting 17 times the luminosity from its outer atmosphere at an effective temperature of 9,376 K. This heat causes it to glow with the white-hot hue of an A-type star. 35 Aquilae is spinning rapidly with a projected rotational velocity of 110 km/s.

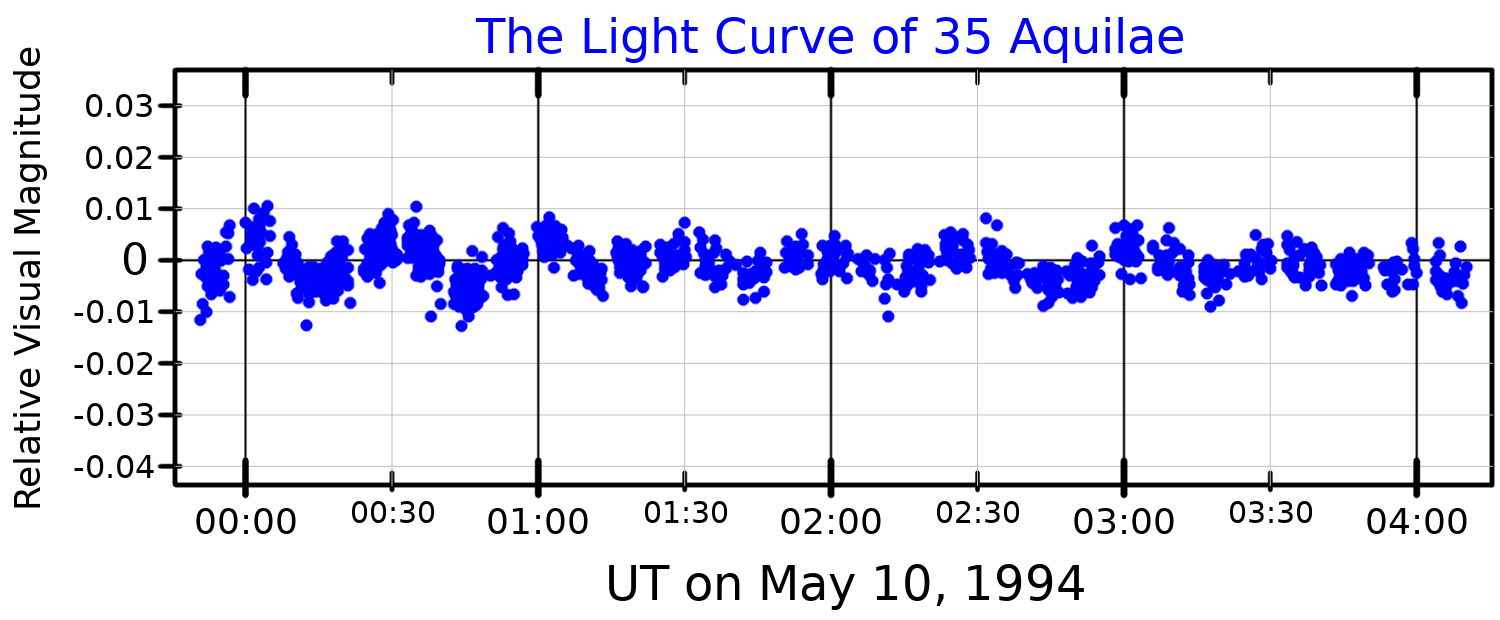
A visual band light curve for 35 Aquilae, adapted from Kuschnig et al. (1994)

In 1994 it was discovered that 35 Aquilae is a variable star with a pulsation period of just 30 minutes. It was determined to be a Delta Scuti variable, which is a type of star found on the instability strip that undergoes short period pulsations. Observation with the Spitzer Space Telescope shows that 35 Aquilae is radiating an excess level of infrared radiation for a star of its type. This excess may be explained by the heating of nearby interstellar dust belonging to a diffuse cloud of material that the star is passing through. This interaction may also explain the Lambda Boötis categorization for this star.
