= 20 Aquilae =

Star in the constellation Aquila

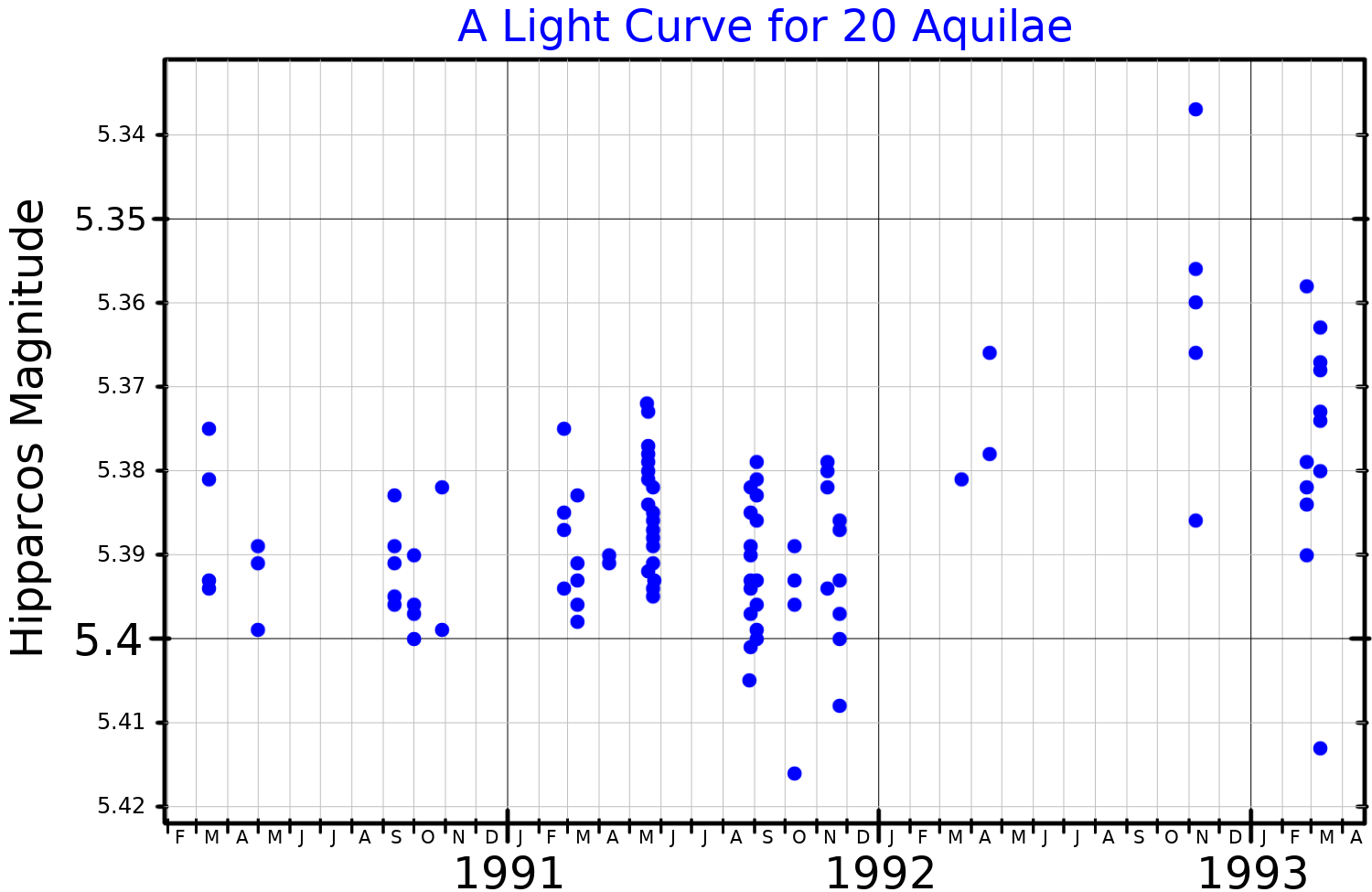
- A light curve for 20 Aquilae, plotted from Hipparcos data

Observation data Epoch J2000 Equinox J2000
- Constellation: Aquila
- Right ascension: 19^{h} 12^{m} 40.71201^{s}
- Declination: −07° 56′ 22.2650″
- Apparent magnitude (V): 5.362

Characteristics
- Spectral type: B3 V, B3 IV, or B2/3 II
- B−V color index: +0.088

Astrometry
Radial velocity (R_{v})	−23.0±0.7 km/s
Proper motion (μ)	RA: +14.040 mas/yr Dec.: –6.814 mas/yr
Parallax (π)	3.5374±0.1720 mas
Distance	920 ± 40 ly (280 ± 10 pc)
Absolute magnitude (M_{V})	−2.02

Details
Mass	8.6±0.2 M_{☉}
Luminosity (bolometric)	7,284 L_{☉}
Temperature	18,700 K
Rotational velocity (v sin i)	133±6 km/s
Age	27.9±4.1 Myr

Other designations
- 20 Aql, NSV 11808, BD−08°4887, GC 26461, HD 179406, HIP 94385, HR 7279, SAO 143134

Database references
SIMBAD	data

20 Aquilae, abbreviated 20 Aql, is an irregular variable star in the equatorial constellation of Aquila. 20 Aquilae is its Flamsteed designation. It ranges in magnitude from a peak of 5.33 down to 5.36, which is bright enough for the star to be visible to the naked eye. The estimated distance to this star is around 920 light years, based upon an annual parallax shift of 3.5 mas. The star is moving closer to the Earth with a heliocentric radial velocity of −23 km/s.

There has been some disagreement over the stellar classification of this star. Buscombe (1962) listed a class of B3 IV, which suggests a B-type subgiant star that has exhausted the hydrogen at its core and is expanding off the main sequence. Lesh (1968) and Braganca et al. (2012) matched a B-type main sequence star with a class of B3 V. However, Houk and Swift (1999) found a class of B2/3 II, indicating this is an evolved bright giant.

The star is about 28 million years old with a high rate of spin, showing a projected rotational velocity of 133 km/s. It has 8.6 times the mass of the Sun and is radiating 7,284 times the Sun's luminosity from its photosphere at an effective temperature of 18,700 K.
