= HR 7135 =

Star in the constellation Aquila

Observation data Epoch J2000 Equinox ICRS
- Constellation: Aquila
- Right ascension: 18^{h} 55^{m} 27.46151^{s}
- Declination: +06° 36′ 55.1499″
- Apparent magnitude (V): 5.57

Characteristics
- Evolutionary stage: red clump
- Spectral type: G9 III
- U−B color index: +0.87
- B−V color index: +1.041±0.002

Astrometry
Radial velocity (R_{v})	23.31±0.09 km/s
Proper motion (μ)	RA: +7.972 mas/yr Dec.: −92.211 mas/yr
Parallax (π)	11.5405±0.1636 mas
Distance	283 ± 4 ly (87 ± 1 pc)
Absolute magnitude (M_{V})	0.87

Orbit
Primary	HR 7135 A
Name	HR 7135 B
Period (P)	2,994±29 d
Semi-major axis (a)	26.6±3.4 mas
Eccentricity (e)	0.243±0.026
Inclination (i)	31.9±3.6°
Longitude of the node (Ω)	12.6±7.7°
Periastron epoch (T)	2444276.5±52 JD
Argument of periastron (ω) (secondary)	35±7°
Semi-amplitude (K_{1}) (primary)	4.65±0.13 km/s

Details

HR 7135 A
Mass	1.54 M_{☉}
Radius	10.69+0.17 −0.93 R_{☉}
Luminosity	52.8±0.9 L_{☉}
Surface gravity (log g)	2.7 cgs
Temperature	4,666±51 K
Metallicity [Fe/H]	−0.26 dex
Rotational velocity (v sin i)	0.0 km/s
Age	3.21 Gyr

Other designations
- 62 Ser, BD+06°3978, FK5 3509, HD 175515, HIP 92872, HR 7135, SAO 124050

Database references
SIMBAD	data

HR 7135 is a binary star system. Despite its Flamsteed designation of 62 Serpentis, the star can be found in the equatorial constellation of Aquila, in front of a dark rift in the Milky Way near the constellation border. It is visible to the naked eye as a dim, yellow-hued point of light with an apparent visual magnitude of 5.57. The system is located 283 light years distant from the Sun, based on parallax, and is drifting further away with a radial velocity of 23 km/s.

Discovery of the binary nature of this system is credited to Canadian astronomer H. H. Plaskett in 1922. It is a single-lined spectroscopic binary with an orbital period of 8.2 years and an eccentricity of 0.24. The visible component is an aging giant star with a stellar classification of G9 III, having exhausted the supply of hydrogen at its core and expanded to 10.7 times the Sun's radius. It is a red clump giant, indicating it is on the horizontal branch and is generating energy via core helium fusion. The star is 3.2 billion years old with 1.54 times the mass of the Sun. It is radiating 53 times the Sun's luminosity from its enlarged photosphere at an effective temperature of 4,666 K. The star has a very low rate of spin, with the projected rotational velocity being too small to measure.
