= 27 Aquilae =

Star in the constellation Aquila

- Location of 27 Aquilae (circled)

Observation data Epoch J2000.0 Equinox J2000.0 (ICRS)
- Constellation: Aquila
- Right ascension: 19^{h} 20^{m} 35.68321^{s}
- Declination: −00° 53′ 31.8067″
- Apparent magnitude (V): 5.49

Characteristics
- Spectral type: B9 III
- U−B color index: −0.23
- B−V color index: −0.04

Astrometry
| Radial velocity (R_{v}) | −27 km/s |
| Proper motion (μ) | RA: 5.42 mas/yr Dec.: 2.83 mas/yr |
| Parallax (π) | 7.45±0.28 mas |
| Distance | 440 ± 20 ly (134 ± 5 pc) |
| Absolute bolometric magnitude (M_{bol}) | 2.04–2.27 |

Details
| Mass | 2.67 M_{☉} |
| Radius | 3.81 R_{☉} |
| Luminosity | 150 L_{☉} |
| Surface gravity (log g) | 3.70 cgs |
| Temperature | 10,346 K |
| Rotational velocity (v sin i) | 55 km/s |
| Age | 237 Myr |

Other designations
- BD−01°3716, GC 26673, HD 181440, HIP 95073, HR 7336, PPM 180629, SAO 143292

Database references
| SIMBAD | data |

27 Aquilae (abbreviated 27 Aql) is a star in the equatorial constellation of Aquila. 27 Aquilae is its Flamsteed designation though it also bears the Bayer designation d Aquilae. It has an apparent visual magnitude of 5.49, which is faintly visible to the naked eye. Based upon parallax measurements made during the Hipparcos mission, this star is at a distance of 440 light-years (130 parsecs) from Earth, give or take a 20 light-year margin of error. At this distance, the brightness of the star is diminished from extinction caused by interstellar gas and dust.

The spectrum of 27 Aquilae fits a stellar classification of B9 III, with the luminosity class of III typically indicating this is an evolved giant star. As it lies within the field of view of the CoRoT satellite, close observation have been made of its luminosity. The star shows a multiperiodic variability with at least six pulsation frequencies discovered. It has a high rate of rotation with a projected rotational velocity of 55 km/s. The outer atmosphere is radiating energy into space at an effective temperature of around 10,346 K, giving it the blue-white hue of a B-type star.
