= 70 Aquilae =

Star in the constellation Aquila

- Location of 70 Aquilae (circled in red)

Observation data Epoch J2000 Equinox ICRS
- Constellation: Aquila
- Right ascension: 20^{h} 36^{m} 43.63319^{s}
- Declination: −02° 32′ 59.8367″
- Apparent magnitude (V): 4.903

Characteristics
- Evolutionary stage: red giant branch
- Spectral type: K4+ III Ba1, K3 III, or K5 II
- B−V color index: 1.606±0.041

Astrometry
Radial velocity (R_{v})	−9.4±0.4 km/s
Proper motion (μ)	RA: +10.862 mas/yr Dec.: –15.416 mas/yr
Parallax (π)	4.0825±0.1052 mas
Distance	800 ± 20 ly (245 ± 6 pc)
Absolute magnitude (M_{V})	−3.05

Details
Mass	6.2±0.6 M_{☉}
Radius	96 R_{☉}
Luminosity (bolometric)	4,072 L_{☉}
Surface gravity (log g)	1.9 cgs
Temperature	3,900 K
Metallicity [Fe/H]	−0.294±0.093 dex
Rotational velocity (v sin i)	1.9 km/s
Age	63.1±17.8 Myr

Other designations
- 70 Aql, BD−03°4961, FK5 3648, HD 196321, HIP 101692, HR 7873, SAO 144624

Database references
SIMBAD	data

70 Aquilae, abbreviated 70 Aql, is a single orange-hued star in the equatorial constellation of Aquila. 70 Aquilae is its Flamsteed designation. It is visible to the naked eye with an apparent visual magnitude of 4.90. The distance to 70 Aquilae, as determined from its annual parallax shift of 4.1 mas, is around 800 light years. The star is moving closer to the Earth with a heliocentric radial velocity of −9 km/s.

== Classification ==
Perkins et al. (1989) found a stellar classification of K4+ III Ba1 for this star, suggesting it is a K-type giant with abundance anomaly of barium. Houk and Swift (1999) matched an ordinary giant with a class of K3 III. Many sources still use the 1991 Bright Star Catalogue classification of K5 II, which instead suggests a bright giant star.

== Size and temperature ==
The interferometry-measured angular diameter of this star, after correcting for limb darkening, is 3.27±0.04 mas, which, at its estimated distance, equates to a physical radius of roughly 96 times the radius of the Sun. 70 Aquilae is about 63 million years old with 6 times the mass of the Sun. It is radiating 4,072 times the Sun's luminosity from its enlarged photosphere at an effective temperature of 3,900 K.
