= 11 Aquilae =

Star in the constellation Aquila

Observation data Epoch J2000 Equinox ICRS
- Constellation: Aquila
- Right ascension: 18^{h} 59^{m} 05.73878^{s}
- Declination: +13° 37′ 20.0743″
- Apparent magnitude (V): 5.220

Characteristics
- Evolutionary stage: subgiant
- Spectral type: F6IV
- U−B color index: +0.07
- B−V color index: +0.53
- R−I color index: 0.3

Astrometry
Radial velocity (R_{v})	+13.6 km/s
Proper motion (μ)	RA: +14.853 mas/yr Dec.: −124.527 mas/yr
Parallax (π)	20.9316±0.0742 mas
Distance	155.8 ± 0.6 ly (47.8 ± 0.2 pc)
Absolute magnitude (M_{V})	2.96

Details
Mass	1.67 M_{☉}
Radius	3.40 R_{☉}
Luminosity	14.8 L_{☉}
Surface gravity (log g)	3.44 cgs
Temperature	6,141 K
Metallicity [Fe/H]	−0.05 dex
Rotational velocity (v sin i)	24.6±0.7 km/s
Age	2.05 Gyr

Other designations
- BD+13°3841, HD 176303, HIP 93203, HR 7172, SAO 104308

Database references
SIMBAD	data

11 Aquilae (abbreviated 11 Aql) is a single star in the equatorial constellation of Aquila. 11 Aquilae is the Flamsteed designation. It has an apparent visual magnitude of 5.2, which means it is faintly visible to the naked eye. Based upon an annual parallax shift of 20.9 mas, the distance to this star is approximately 156 light-years (48 parsecs). The brightness of this star is diminished by 0.33 in magnitude because of extinction from interstellar gas and dust.

This is an F-type main sequence star with a stellar classification of F6IV. It is radiating about 14.8 times the luminosity of the Sun from its outer atmosphere at an effective temperature of 6,141 K, giving it the yellow-white glow of an F-type star. 11 Aquilae has been listed as a candidate for membership in the Ursa Major Moving Group, but most likely does not belong to that association.
