= 8 Aquilae =

Star in the constellation Aquila

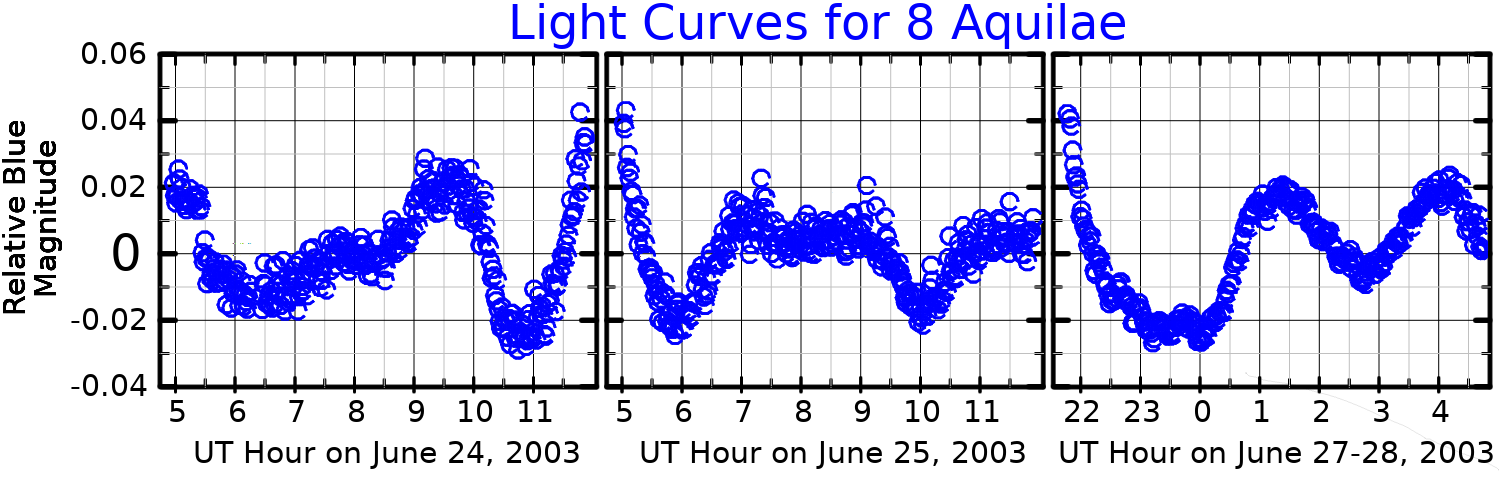
- A blue band light curve for 8 Aquilae, adapted from Machado et al. (2007)

Observation data Epoch J2000 Equinox J2000
- Constellation: Aquila
- Right ascension: 18^{h} 51^{m} 22.15821^{s}
- Declination: −03° 19′ 04.2851″
- Apparent magnitude (V): 6.08

Characteristics
- Evolutionary stage: main sequence
- Spectral type: F0 IV or F2 III
- U−B color index: +0.06
- B−V color index: +0.299±0.007
- Variable type: δ Sct

Astrometry
Radial velocity (R_{v})	+11.8 km/s
Proper motion (μ)	RA: +2.019 mas/yr Dec.: −21.411 mas/yr
Parallax (π)	12.0549±0.0268 mas
Distance	270.6 ± 0.6 ly (83.0 ± 0.2 pc)
Absolute magnitude (M_{V})	1.27

Details
Mass	1.60 M_{☉}
Radius	3.0 R_{☉}
Luminosity	18.89 L_{☉}
Surface gravity (log g)	3.88±0.14 cgs
Temperature	7,395±251 K
Metallicity [Fe/H]	0.14 dex
Rotational velocity (v sin i)	105 km/s
Age	959 Myr

Other designations
- 8 Aql, V1729 Aql, BD−03°4392, FK5 3500, HD 174589, HIP 92524, HR 7101, SAO 142706

Database references
SIMBAD	data

8 Aquilae is a star in the equatorial constellation of Aquila, located 271 light years away from the Sun. 8 Aquilae is the Flamsteed designation. It can be viewed with the naked eye in good seeing conditions, appearing as a dim, yellow-white hued star with an apparent visual magnitude of 6.08. The star is moving further from the Earth with a heliocentric radial velocity of +12 km/s.

Abt and Morrell (1995) found a stellar classification of F0 IV for this star, suggesting it is an F-type subgiant. In their 2010 study, Fox Machado et al. assigned a class of F2 III, which matches an evolved giant star. Despite the spectral classifications, evolutionary models place the star towards the end of its main sequence life, with an age of about a billion years.

Lester Fox Machado et al. discovered that 8 Aquilae is a variable star during observations conducted in 2003, and published in 2007. It is a Delta Scuti variable with at least three overlapping pulsation frequencies, although the total amplitude of its brightness variations is only about 0.02 magnitudes. It has a relatively high rotation rate, showing a projected rotational velocity of 105 km/s. It has 1.6 times the mass of the Sun and is radiating 19 times the Sun's luminosity from its photosphere at an effective temperature of about 7,395 K.
