= 51 Aquilae =

Star in the constellation Aquila

Observation data Epoch J2000 Equinox ICRS
- Constellation: Aquila
- Right ascension: 19^{h} 50^{m} 46.78324^{s}
- Declination: −10° 45′ 48.6319″
- Apparent magnitude (V): 5.39

Characteristics
- Evolutionary stage: main sequence
- Spectral type: F5 V Fe-1 CH-0.7
- B−V color index: +0.38

Astrometry
Radial velocity (R_{v})	+6 km/s
Proper motion (μ)	RA: -33.35 mas/yr Dec.: +32.88 mas/yr
Parallax (π)	35.88±0.35 mas
Distance	90.9 ± 0.9 ly (27.9 ± 0.3 pc)
Absolute magnitude (M_{V})	3.16

Details
Surface gravity (log g)	4.16 cgs
Temperature	6,812 K
Metallicity [Fe/H]	−0.18 dex
Rotational velocity (v sin i)	77.5 km/s
Age	1.6 Gyr

Other designations
- BD−11°5149, FK5 744, HD 187532, HIP 97650, HR 7553, SAO 163036

Database references
SIMBAD	data

51 Aquilae (abbreviated 51 Aql) is a star in the equatorial constellation of Aquila. 51 Aquilae is its Flamsteed designation. It has an apparent visual magnitude of 5.39, which means it is faintly visible to the naked eye. Based upon an annual parallax shift of 35.88 mas, the distance to this star is around 90.9 light-years (27.9 parsecs).

This is an F-type main sequence star with a stellar classification of F5 V Fe-1 CH-0.7; where the 'Fe-1' and 'CH-0.7' represent abundance deficiencies of iron and the molecule CN, respectively. It is about 1.6 billion years old and is spinning relatively quickly with a projected rotational velocity of 77.5 km/s. The outer atmosphere has an effective temperature of 6,812 K, giving it the yellow-white hue characteristic of an F-type star.
