= 28 Aquilae =

Star in the constellation Aquila

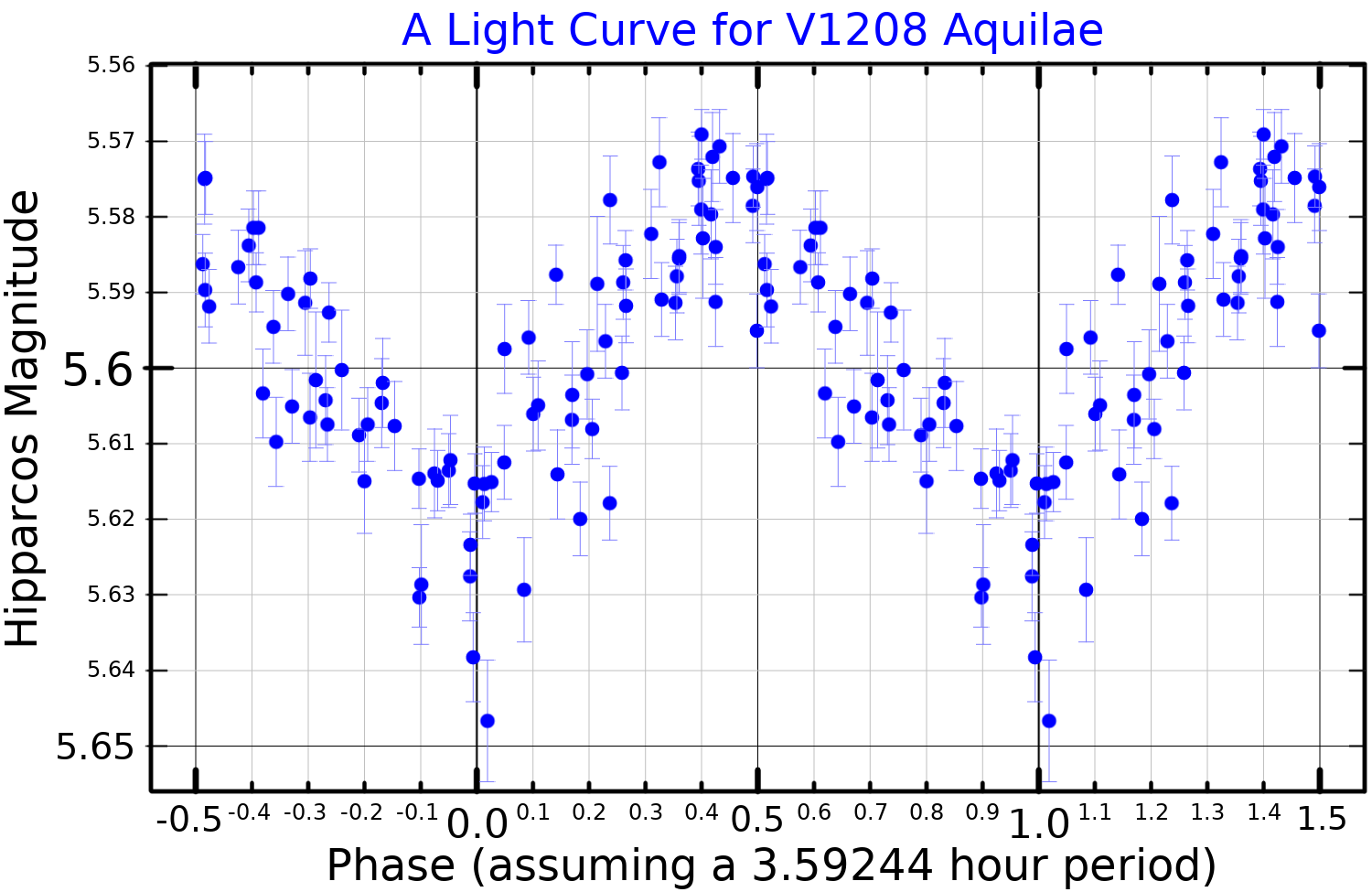
- A light curve for V1208 Aquilae, plotted from Hipparcos data

Observation data Epoch J2000 Equinox ICRS
- Constellation: Aquila
- Right ascension: 19^{h} 19^{m} 39.34802^{s}
- Declination: +12° 22′ 28.8457″
- Apparent magnitude (V): 5.51 - 5.56

Characteristics
- Spectral type: F0 III
- U−B color index: +0.182
- B−V color index: +0.257
- Variable type: δ Sct

Astrometry
| Radial velocity (R_{v}) | +4.36 km/s |
| Proper motion (μ) | RA: +4.249 mas/yr Dec.: +16.199 mas/yr |
| Parallax (π) | 9.5836±0.0768 mas |
| Distance | 340 ± 3 ly (104.3 ± 0.8 pc) |
| Absolute magnitude (M_{V}) | +0.46 |

Details
| Mass | 2.411 M_{☉} |
| Radius | 4.606 R_{☉} |
| Luminosity | 57.8 L_{☉} |
| Surface gravity (log g) | 3.41 cgs |
| Temperature | 7,417 K |
| Metallicity [Fe/H] | −0.16 dex |
| Rotational velocity (v sin i) | 57 km/s |
| Age | 655 Myr |

Other designations
- 28 Aql, V1208 Aql, BD+12°3879, HD 181333, HIP 94982, HR 7331, SAO 104722

Database references
| SIMBAD | data |

28 Aquilae, abbreviated 28 Aql, is a star in the equatorial constellation of Aquila. 28 Aquilae is its Flamsteed designation though it also bears the Bayer designation A Aquilae, and the variable star designation V1208 Aquilae. It has an apparent visual magnitude is 5.5, making this a faint star that requires dark suburban skies to view (according to the Bortle Dark-Sky Scale). The annual parallax shift of 9.6 mas means this star is located at a distance of approximately 340 light-years (100 parsecs) from Earth.

The spectrum of this star matches a stellar classification of F0 III. Despite consistent spectral classifications as a giant star, models show that it is just reaching the end of its main sequence lifetime at an age of 655 million years.

The variability of 28 Aquilae was discovered by Michel Breger in 1969. It was revealed to be a Delta Scuti-type pulsating variable star with at least two periods of pulsation. The known periods have frequencies of 6.68 and 7.12 cycles per day. The outer atmosphere has an effective temperature of 7,417 K, which lies in the range of a yellow-white hued F-type star.
