= 31 Aquilae =

Star in the constellation Aquila

- Location of 31 Aquilae (circled)

Observation data Epoch J2000 Equinox ICRS
- Constellation: Aquila
- Right ascension: 19^{h} 24^{m} 58.19997^{s}
- Declination: +11° 56′ 39.8885″
- Apparent magnitude (V): 5.16

Characteristics
- Evolutionary stage: subgiant
- Spectral type: G8 IV
- U−B color index: +0.42
- B−V color index: +0.77

Astrometry
Radial velocity (R_{v})	−100.5 km/s
Proper motion (μ)	RA: +721.292 mas/yr Dec.: +642.968 mas/yr
Parallax (π)	67.0153±0.0657 mas
Distance	48.67 ± 0.05 ly (14.92 ± 0.01 pc)
Absolute magnitude (M_{V})	+4.26

Details
Mass	1.07±0.04 M_{☉}
Radius	1.348±0.032 R_{☉}
Luminosity	1.64±0.14 L_{☉}
Surface gravity (log g)	4.18±0.02 cgs
Temperature	5,617±8 K
Metallicity [Fe/H]	+0.37 dex
Rotation	40.3±1.5 days
Rotational velocity (v sin i)	1.3±0.5 km/s
Age	8.9±1.3 Gyr

Other designations
- BD+11 3833, FK5 1503, HD 182572, GJ 759, NLTT 47763, HIP 95447, HR 7373, LFT 1477, LHS 3463, LTT 15668, NSV 11994, SAO 104807.

Database references
SIMBAD	data

31 Aquilae (abbreviated 31 Aql) is a star in the equatorial constellation of Aquila. 31 Aquilae is its Flamsteed designation though it also bears the Bayer designation b Aquilae. This star has an apparent visual magnitude of 5.16 and is 49.5 light years from Earth. It has no known companions.

== Properties ==
31 Aquilae has an apparent visual magnitude of 5.16, making it bright enough to be seen with the naked eye in dark skies. The annual parallax shift of 67.0 mas yields a distance estimate of 48.7 light-years (14.9 parsecs) from Earth. It is a variable star with a magnitude change of less than 0.02.

With a stellar classification of G8 IV, the luminosity class of IV indicates this is a subgiant star. Compared to the Sun, it has 107% of the mass and 135% of the radius. It is radiating 1.64 the luminosity of the Sun from its outer atmosphere at an effective temperature of 5,617 K, giving it the yellow hue of a G-type star. Its age is probably similar to NGC 188, the oldest open cluster known, which was calculated to be over 5 billion years. For its age, it is surprisingly rich in elements other than hydrogen or helium, contrary to common assumptions that the oldest stars should be metal-poor. Asteroseismology suggests an age of nine billion years.

No certain substellar companion has been detected so far around 31 Aquilae. McDonald Observatory team has set limits to the presence of one or more planets around 31 Aquilae with masses between 0.22 and 1.9 Jupiter masses and average separations spanning between 0.05 and 5.2 astronomical units.

== Optical companions ==
The following stars are optical companions that are coincidentally aligned near the line of sight to 31 Aquilae.

Companion	HD 231345	BD+11 3833C
Right ascension	19^{h} 24^{m} 51.8595^{s}	19^{h} 24^{m} 50.8^{s}
Declination	+11° 57′ 14.692″	+11° 57′ 36″
Magnitude	8.56	10.6
Spectral type	G0	
Reference	Simbad	Simbad
