= Psi Aquilae =

Star in the constellation Aquila

- Location of ψ Aquilae (circled)

Observation data Epoch J2000 Equinox J2000
- Constellation: Aquila
- Right ascension: 19^{h} 44^{m} 34.19086^{s}
- Declination: +13° 18′ 10.0063″
- Apparent magnitude (V): 6.25

Characteristics
- Spectral type: B9 III-IV
- U−B color index: −0.22
- B−V color index: −0.04

Astrometry
Radial velocity (R_{v})	−19.7±2.5 km/s
Proper motion (μ)	RA: +0.561 mas/yr Dec.: −9.950 mas/yr
Parallax (π)	2.8253±0.0752 mas
Distance	1,150 ± 30 ly (354 ± 9 pc)
Absolute magnitude (M_{V})	−1.17

Details
Mass	3.8 M_{☉}
Radius	6.5 R_{☉}
Luminosity	506 L_{☉}
Surface gravity (log g)	3.41 cgs
Temperature	10,167 K
Metallicity [Fe/H]	0.21 dex
Rotation	7.1 days
Rotational velocity (v sin i)	20 km/s
Age	~247 Myr

Other designations
- ψ Aql, 48 Aquilae, BD+12°4059, GC 27321, HD 186547, HIP 97139, HR 7511, SAO 105199, PPM 136885

Database references
SIMBAD	data

Psi Aquilae is a star in the equatorial constellation of Aquila. Its name is a Bayer designation that is Latinized from ψ Aquilae, and abbreviated Psi Aql or ψ Aql. This is a faint star with an apparent visual magnitude of 6.25, which, according to the Bortle Dark-Sky Scale, can be seen with the naked eye in dark rural skies. The orbit of the Earth causes an annual parallax shift of 2.83 mas, which indicates a distance of approximately 1,150 light-years (350 parsecs). It is drifting closer to the Sun with a radial velocity of −20 km/s.

The spectrum of Psi Aquilae matches a stellar classification of B9 III-IV, with the luminosity class of III-IV indicating the spectrum lies part way between that of a subgiant and a giant star. The effective temperature of the star's outer atmosphere is 10,167 K, giving it the blue-white hue of a B-type star. It has nearly four times the mass of the Sun, 6.5 times its radius, and has a projected rotational velocity of 20 km/s.
