= Phi Aquilae =

Binary star system in the constellation Aquila

- Location of φ Aquilae (circled)

Observation data Epoch J2000 Equinox ICRS
- Constellation: Aquila
- Right ascension: 19^{h} 56^{m} 14.252^{s}
- Declination: +11° 25′ 25.40″
- Apparent magnitude (V): +5.28

Characteristics
- Spectral type: A1 IV + K1 V to M1 V
- U−B color index: −0.02
- B−V color index: +0.00

Astrometry
Radial velocity (R_{v})	−27.2±0.9 km/s
Proper motion (μ)	RA: +32.745 mas/yr Dec.: +5.630 mas/yr
Parallax (π)	14.7474±0.0869 mas
Distance	221 ± 1 ly (67.8 ± 0.4 pc)
Absolute magnitude (M_{V})	+1.14

Orbit
Period (P)	3.320669±0.000017 d
Eccentricity (e)	0
Periastron epoch (T)	2459445.0916±0.0011 JD
Argument of periastron (ω) (secondary)	43°
Semi-amplitude (K_{1}) (primary)	36.48±0.07 km/s

Details

A
Mass	2.39 M_{☉}
Radius	1.8–2.5 R_{☉}
Luminosity	28.2^{+0.6}_{−0.7} L_{☉}
Surface gravity (log g)	4.30 cgs
Temperature	9,484±13 K
Metallicity [Fe/H]	+0.47 dex
Rotational velocity (v sin i)	27 km/s
Age	280 Myr

B
Mass	0.40 M_{☉}

Other designations
- φ Aquilae, φ Aql, 61 Aql, BD+11°4055, FK5 3590, GC 27604, HD 188728, HIP 98103, HR 7610, SAO 105438, PPM 137250, WDS J19562+1125AB

Database references
SIMBAD	data

Phi Aquilae is a binary star system in the equatorial constellation of Aquila. Its name is a Bayer designation that is Latinized from φ Aquilae, and abbreviated Phi Aql or φ Aql. The system has an apparent visual magnitude of +5.28 and is visible to the naked eye as a faint point of light. With an annual parallax shift of 14.7 mas, this star is located at a distance of approximately 221 light-years (68 parsecs) from Earth. It is drifting closer with a radial velocity of −27 km/s. Based on its motion through space, this system is a candidate member of the nearby Argus association of co-moving stars, although it may be too old.

Phi Aquilae is a single-lined spectroscopic binary with an orbital period of 3.32067 days. The pair have a projected separation of 190.4 AU as of 2008. The primary component is a subgiant star with a stellar classification of A1 IV. The star is around 280 million years old and is spinning with a projected rotational velocity of 27 km/s. It has 2.39 times the mass of the Sun and somewhere in the range of 1.8–2.5 times the Sun's radius. The outer atmosphere has an effective temperature of 9,509 K, giving it the white-hued appearance of an A-type star. It is radiating 34 times the luminosity of the Sun.

The orbiting companion may be the source of the X-ray emission from this system, as stars similar to the primary component do not generally produce detectable levels of X-rays. It has 40% of the mass of the Sun. Based on photometric data from the TESS mission, the pair may undergo grazing eclipses. This implies an orbital inclination of at least 79°, and constrains the mass of the secondary to 0.5 M_{☉}.

A third component of this system was detected during the VAST survey. This faint component lies at an angular separation of 2.83 arcseconds, for a projected separation of 190 AU and an estimated orbital period of over 1,500 years.
