= 64 Aquilae =

Star in the constellation Aquila

Observation data Epoch J2000 Equinox J2000
- Constellation: Aquila
- Right ascension: 20^{h} 08^{m} 01.82234^{s}
- Declination: −00° 40′ 41.4646″
- Apparent magnitude (V): 5.97

Characteristics
- Evolutionary stage: red giant branch
- Spectral type: K1 III/IV
- B−V color index: +1.023±0.003

Astrometry
Radial velocity (R_{v})	−3.64±0.39 km/s
Proper motion (μ)	RA: +115.435 mas/yr Dec.: –67.712 mas/yr
Parallax (π)	21.5357±0.0402 mas
Distance	151.4 ± 0.3 ly (46.43 ± 0.09 pc)
Absolute magnitude (M_{V})	2.61

Details
Mass	1.17±0.06 M_{☉}
Radius	4.49±0.13 R_{☉}
Luminosity	11.17 L_{☉}
Surface gravity (log g)	3.31±0.07 cgs
Temperature	4,786±20 K
Metallicity [Fe/H]	−0.03±0.03 dex
Rotational velocity (v sin i)	1.51 km/s
Age	6.20±1.18 Gyr

Other designations
- 64 Aql, BD−01°3899, GC 27930, HD 191067, HIP 99171, HR 7690, SAO 144095

Database references
SIMBAD	data

64 Aquilae, abbreviated 64 Aql, is a star in the equatorial constellation of Aquila. 64 Aquilae is its Flamsteed designation. It is a faint star that requires good viewing conditions to see, having an apparent visual magnitude of 5.97. The distance to 64 Aql, as determined from its annual parallax shift of 21.5 mas, is 151 light years. At that distance, the visual magnitude of the star is diminished by an extinction of 0.029 due to interstellar dust. It is moving closer to the Earth with a heliocentric radial velocity of −3.6 km/s.

This is an evolved giant star currently on the red giant branch with a stellar classification of K1 III/IV. The luminosity class of 'III/IV' indicates the spectrum shows a blend of features matching a subgiant and giant star. It is around 6.2 billion years old with 1.17 times the mass of the Sun and has expanded to 4.5 times the Sun's radius. The star is radiating 11 times the Sun's luminosity from its enlarged photosphere at an effective temperature of 4,786 K.
