= Omega1 Aquilae =

Star in the constellation Aquila

ω^{1} Aquilae
- Location of ω^{1} Aquilae (circled)

Observation data Epoch J2000.0 Equinox J2000.0 (ICRS)
- Constellation: Aquila
- Right ascension: 19^{h} 17^{m} 48.999^{s}
- Declination: +11° 35′ 43.53″
- Apparent magnitude (V): 5.284

Characteristics
- Evolutionary stage: subgiant
- Spectral type: F0 IV
- U−B color index: +0.204
- B−V color index: +0.238

Astrometry
Radial velocity (R_{v})	−14.3 km/s
Proper motion (μ)	RA: +1.070 mas/yr Dec.: +13.640 mas/yr
Parallax (π)	8.266±0.0721 mas
Distance	395 ± 3 ly (121 ± 1 pc)
Absolute magnitude (M_{V})	−0.24

Details
Mass	2.85±0.06 M_{☉}
Radius	5.38±0.03 R_{☉}
Luminosity	92.2±1.6 L_{☉}
Surface gravity (log g)	3.26 cgs
Temperature	7,648^{+15}_{−14} K
Rotational velocity (v sin i)	89 km/s
Age	456+129 −49 Myr

Other designations
- ω^{1} Aql, 25 Aquilae, BD+11°3790, FK5 725, GC 26609, HD 180868, HIP 94834, HR 7315, SAO 104691, PPM 136078

Database references
SIMBAD	data

Omega^{1} Aquilae is a single star in the equatorial constellation of Aquila. Its name is a Bayer designation that is Latinized from ω^{1} Aquilae, and abbreviated Omega^{1} Aql or ω^{1} Aql. With an apparent visual magnitude of 5.2 it is a faint, yellow-white hued star that can be seen with the naked eye in dark skies. From the annual parallax shift of 8.27 mas, the distance to this star can be estimated as 395 light-years (121 parsecs), give or take a 3 light year margin of error. It is drifting closer to the Sun with a radial velocity of −14 km/s.

The spectrum of this star fits a stellar classification of F0 IV. Typically, a luminosity class of IV means that the star is in the subgiant stage. It is rotating rapidly with a projected rotational velocity of 89 km/s. The star has 2.85 times the mass of the Sun and five times the Sun's radius. It is radiating 85 times the luminosity of the Sun from its photosphere at an effective temperature of 7,766 K.
