= 58 Aquilae =

Star in the constellation Aquila

Observation data Epoch J2000 Equinox ICRS
- Constellation: Aquila
- Right ascension: 19^{h} 54^{m} 44.79543^{s}
- Declination: +00° 16′ 25.0534″
- Apparent magnitude (V): 5.60

Characteristics
- Spectral type: B9 IV
- B−V color index: 0.098±0.026

Astrometry
Radial velocity (R_{v})	−53.1 km/s
Proper motion (μ)	RA: +39.126 mas/yr Dec.: –13.931 mas/yr
Parallax (π)	6.2649±0.1382 mas
Distance	520 ± 10 ly (160 ± 4 pc)
Absolute magnitude (M_{V})	0.32

Details
Radius	5.62+0.08 −0.19 R_{☉}
Luminosity	116.5±3.0 L_{☉}
Surface gravity (log g)	3.8 cgs
Temperature	7,946 K
Metallicity [Fe/H]	−0.23±0.04 dex
Rotational velocity (v sin i)	110 km/s

Other designations
- 58 Aql, BD−00°3871, GC 27565, HD 188350, HIP 97980, HR 7596, SAO 125219

Database references
SIMBAD	data

58 Aquilae is a single star located around 520 light years from the Sun in the equatorial constellation of Aquila, near Eta Aquilae. 58 Aquilae is its Flamsteed designation. It is visible to the naked eye as a dim, blue-white hued star with an apparent visual magnitude of 5.60. This object is moving closer to the Earth with a heliocentric radial velocity of −53 km/s, and may come as close as 161 light-years in around 1.8 million years.

This object has a stellar classification of B9 IV, matching a late B-type subgiant star. It has 5.6 times the radius of the Sun with a high rate of spin, showing a projected rotational velocity of 110 km/s. The star is radiating 117 times the luminosity of the Sun from its photosphere at an effective temperature of 7,946 K.
