= 62 Aquilae =

Star in the constellation Aquila

Observation data Epoch J2000 Equinox ICRS
- Constellation: Aquila
- Right ascension: 20^{h} 04^{m} 23.15078^{s}
- Declination: −00° 42′ 33.5106″
- Apparent magnitude (V): 5.67

Characteristics
- Evolutionary stage: red giant branch
- Spectral type: K4 III
- B−V color index: 1.301±0.005

Astrometry
Radial velocity (R_{v})	+0.2±2.9 km/s
Proper motion (μ)	RA: −3.441 mas/yr Dec.: –118.101 mas/yr
Parallax (π)	7.4356±0.0652 mas
Distance	439 ± 4 ly (134 ± 1 pc)
Absolute magnitude (M_{V})	0.14

Details
Mass	0.89±0.25 M_{☉}
Radius	22.89+0.94 −0.41 R_{☉}
Luminosity	153±3 L_{☉}
Surface gravity (log g)	1.69±0.11 cgs
Temperature	4,246±92 K
Metallicity [Fe/H]	−0.54±0.05 dex
Age	11.2+1.1 −1.0 Gyr

Other designations
- 62 Aql, BD−01°3887, GC 27832, HD 190299, HIP 98844, HR 7667, SAO 144045

Database references
SIMBAD	data

62 Aquilae is a single star located about 427 light years away from the Sun in the equatorial constellation of Aquila. 62 Aquilae is its Flamsteed designation. It is visible to the naked eye as a dim, orange-hued star with an apparent visual magnitude of 5.67.

This is an aging giant star with a stellar classification of K4 III, having exhausted the supply of hydrogen at its core and expanded to 23 times the girth of the Sun. It is 11.2 billion years old with 0.89 times the Sun's mass. The star is radiating 153 times the luminosity of the Sun from its swollen photosphere at an effective temperature of 4,246 K.
