= Lambda Aquilae =

Star in the constellation Aquila

λ Aquilae
- Location of λ Aquilae (circled)

Observation data Epoch J2000 Equinox J2000
- Constellation: Aquila
- Right ascension: 19^{h} 06^{m} 14.939^{s}
- Declination: −04° 52′ 57.23″
- Apparent magnitude (V): 3.43

Characteristics

λ Aql A
- Evolutionary stage: Main sequence
- Spectral type: B9Vn
- U−B color index: −0.27
- B−V color index: −0.048
- Variable type: Constant

λ Aql B
- Evolutionary stage: Main sequence

Astrometry
Radial velocity (R_{v})	−8.8±0.9 km/s
Proper motion (μ)	RA: −19.120 mas/yr Dec.: −89.427 mas/yr
Parallax (π)	25.6409±0.4211 mas
Distance	127 ± 2 ly (39.0 ± 0.6 pc)
Absolute magnitude (M_{V})	+0.54

Details

λ Aql A
Mass	3.1±0.1 M_{☉}
Radius	2.27±0.13 R_{☉}
Luminosity	55 L_{☉}
Surface gravity (log g)	4.15±0.05 cgs
Temperature	12,100±100 K
Metallicity [Fe/H]	0.00 dex
Rotational velocity (v sin i)	103 km/s
Age	90 Myr

λ Aql B
Mass	0.62 M_{☉}
Radius	0.60 R_{☉}
Temperature	4,250 K

Other designations
- λ Aql, 16 Aql, BD−05°4876, FK5 717, GC 26285, HD 177756, HIP 93805, HR 7236, SAO 143021, PPM 202530

Database references
SIMBAD	data

Lambda Aquilae is a binary star in the constellation Aquila. Its identifier is a Bayer designation that is Latinized from λ Aquilae, and abbreviated Lambda Aql or λ Aql. This star has the traditional name Al Thalimain, pronounced /ælˌθælɪˈmeɪn/, which it shares with ι Aquilae. The name is derived from the Arabic الظلیمين al-ẓalīmayn "the two ostriches". Lambda Aquilae might be more precisely called Al Thalimain Prior. It has an apparent visual magnitude of 3.43, which is bright enough to be seen with the naked eye. Parallax measurements place it at a distance of about 127 light-years (39 parsecs) from Earth. It is drifting closer to the Sun with a radial velocity of −9 km/s.

== Properties ==
Lambda Aquilae is a binary star, with two stars orbiting a common center of mass. This system has been resolved with interferometry at the Very Large Telescope, which led to the discovery of the secondary. The projected separation was of 0.18 astronomical units, resulting in an estimated orbital period of 15 days. Before this, there was evidence for a companion via spectroscopy and adaptive optics, but a sequence of detections and non-detections by different studies made the presence of any companions unclear.

The primary star is a main sequence star with a stellar classification of B9Vn, which means that, like the Sun, it is generating energy at its core through the nuclear fusion of hydrogen. It is more massive than the Sun, with about three times its mass, and has 2.3 times the Sun's radius. The star is radiating about 55 times the Sun's luminosity from its photosphere at a higher effective temperature of 11,780 K. This temperature gives Lambda Aquilae the blue-white hue that is a characteristic of B-type stars. Lambda Aquilae was one of the least variable stars observed by the Hipparcos satellite. It has been classified as a suspected Lambda Boötis star, although examination of the ultraviolet spectrum shows that to be unlikely. The star is rotating rapidly with a projected rotational velocity of 103 km s^{−1}.

The secondary is a red dwarf star, and as well as its primary, a main sequence star. It is smaller and cooler than the primary, with 60% of the Sun's radius and an effective temperature of 4,250 K. The estimated magnitude difference is 7.4 magnitudes. This star explain the X-ray emission coming from its sky position; such emission is unexpected for a B-type star, but is typical of a young low-mass star – the estimated age of Lambda Aquilae is 90 million years.

When the primary start to evolve and expand into a red giant, around 300 million years in the future, mass transfer between both stars is expected to occur; the end product will be a common envelope system.

This star lies about 5° from the galactic plane and about 30° from the line of sight to the Galactic Center. This region of the sky is crowded with other objects along the line of sight, with at least 55 located within 10 arcseconds of the star.

== Related space mission ==
NASA's Pioneer 11 space probe, launched in April 1973, exited the Solar System in 1990 and continued in the direction of Lambda Aquilae. It is estimated that it will take around 4 million years for the probe to make its closest approach to its destination, assuming it will remain intact. However, NASA stopped communicating with Pioneer 11 in March 1997 because the space probe's power was already too weak to transmit any data.

== Etymology ==
In Chinese, 天弁 (Tiān Biàn), meaning Market Officer, refers to an asterism consisting of λ Aquilae, α Scuti, δ Scuti, ε Scuti, β Scuti, η Scuti, 12 Aquilae, 15 Aquilae and 14 Aquilae. Consequently, the Chinese name for λ Aquilae itself is 天弁七 (Tiān Biàn qī, English: the Seventh Star of Market Officer).

This star, together with η Aql, θ Aql, δ Aql, ι Aql and κ Aql made up the obsolete constellation Antinous.
