= Nu Aquilae =

Star in the constellation Aquila

ν Aquilae
- Location of ν Aql (circled)

Observation data Epoch J2000 Equinox J2000
- Constellation: Aquila
- Right ascension: 19^{h} 26^{m} 31.08926^{s}
- Declination: +00° 20′ 18.8549″
- Apparent magnitude (V): 4.72

Characteristics
- Evolutionary stage: supergiant
- Spectral type: F3 Ib
- U−B color index: +0.60
- B−V color index: +0.59

Astrometry
Radial velocity (R_{v})	−2.30 km/s
Proper motion (μ)	RA: −0.562 mas/yr Dec.: −2.294 mas/yr
Parallax (π)	0.8752±0.0869 mas
Distance	3,700 ± 400 ly (1,100 ± 100 pc)
Absolute magnitude (M_{V})	−5.58

Details
Mass	12.5 M_{☉}
Radius	71.20^{+14.45}_{−10.23} R_{☉}
Luminosity	7,645±1,464 L_{☉}
Surface gravity (log g)	1.43 cgs
Temperature	6,396+516 −564 K
Metallicity [Fe/H]	−0.03 dex
Rotational velocity (v sin i)	13 km/s
Age	15 Myr

Other designations
- ν Aql, 32 Aql, BD+00°4206, HD 182835, HIP 95585, HR 7387, SAO 124628, CCDM J19265+0021A, WDS J19265+0020A, 2MASS J19460427+1145429

Database references
SIMBAD	data

Nu Aquilae is a supergiant star in the constellation of Aquila that lies close to the celestial equator. Its name is a Bayer designation that is Latinized from ν Aquilae, and abbreviated Nu Aql or ν Aql. It has an apparent visual magnitude of 4.72 and so is faintly visible to the naked eye. Based upon an annual parallax shift of 0.8752 mas (with a 10% margin of error), it is believed to lie approximately 3,700 light-years (1,100 parsecs) from Earth. The variable star NU Aquilae has a similar-looking designation but is a separate and unrelated object.

The spectrum of ν Aql A matches a stellar classification of F3, with the luminosity class of Ib indicating this is a supergiant. This is a massive star, with approximately 12.5 times the mass of the sun, and it spans ~71 times the Sun's girth. It is only 15 million years old and is radiating around 7,600 times the luminosity of the Sun. The outer atmosphere has an effective temperature of 6,700 K and it has the yellow-white hue of an F-type star.

ν Aql B is a magnitude 9.6 star 201 arc-seconds distant with spectral classification of A1 IV/V. It is not physically associated with Nu Aquilae and is at about half the distance of Nu Aquilae.
