= 56 Aquilae =

K-type giant star in the constellation Aquila

Observation data Epoch J2000 Equinox ICRS
- Constellation: Aquila
- Right ascension: 19^{h} 54^{m} 08.27657^{s}
- Declination: −08° 34′ 27.1592″
- Apparent magnitude (V): 5.79

Characteristics
- Evolutionary stage: red giant branch
- Spectral type: K5 III
- U−B color index: +2.00
- B−V color index: +1.664±0.006

Astrometry
Radial velocity (R_{v})	−49.5±2.9 km/s
Proper motion (μ)	RA: +6.321 mas/yr Dec.: −19.121 mas/yr
Parallax (π)	5.5025±0.0807 mas
Distance	593 ± 9 ly (182 ± 3 pc)
Absolute magnitude (M_{V})	−0.66

Details
Mass	1.23 M_{☉}
Radius	43 R_{☉}
Luminosity	896 L_{☉}
Surface gravity (log g)	1.02 cgs
Temperature	3,885 K
Metallicity [Fe/H]	−0.26 dex
Age	13.4 Gyr

Other designations
- 56 Aql, BD−08°5150, FK5 2131, GC 2343, HD 188154, HIP 97928, HR 7584, SAO 143894

Database references
SIMBAD	data

56 Aquilae is a single star in the equatorial constellation of Aquila. 56 Aquilae is its Flamsteed designation. Its apparent visual magnitude is 5.79, meaning it is barely visible to the naked eye as a dim, orange-hued point of light, under ideal viewing conditions. The star is located at a distance of around 593 light-years away from the Sun, based on parallax. It is moving closer to the Earth with a heliocentric radial velocity of −50 km/s, and is predicted to come as near as 222 light-years in around 3.3 million years.

This is an aging giant star with a stellar classification of K5 III, having exhausted the supply of hydrogen at its core and expanded to 43 times the Sun's radius. It is radiating 896 times the luminosity of the Sun from its photosphere at an effective temperature of 3,885 K. 56 Aquilae is a double star, but it does not appear to be a binary star system. It is one of the double stars profiled in Admiral William Henry Smyth's 1864 work, Sidereal Chromatics.
