= Sigma Aquilae =

Star in the constellation Aquila

σ Aquilae
- Location of σ Aquilae (circled)

Observation data Epoch J2000 Equinox ICRS
- Constellation: Aquila
- Right ascension: 19^{h} 39^{m} 11.642^{s}
- Declination: +05° 23′ 51.98″
- Apparent magnitude (V): +5.17

Characteristics
- Spectral type: B3 V + B3 V:
- U−B color index: −0.60
- B−V color index: +0.03
- Variable type: β Lyr

Astrometry
Radial velocity (R_{v})	−4.8±0.9 km/s
Proper motion (μ)	RA: +4.528 mas/yr Dec.: −4.507 mas/yr
Parallax (π)	4.1557±0.0775 mas
Distance	780 ± 10 ly (241 ± 4 pc)
Absolute magnitude (M_{V})	−1.69

Orbit
Primary	σ Aql A
Name	σ Aql B
Period (P)	1.95028±0.00002 d
Semi-major axis (a)	14.3 R_{☉}
Eccentricity (e)	0
Inclination (i)	71.97°
Periastron epoch (T)	2459809.625±0.004 HJD
Semi-amplitude (K_{1}) (primary)	156.2±2.9 km/s
Semi-amplitude (K_{2}) (secondary)	196.7±3.1 km/s

Details

σ Aql A
Mass	5.8±0.1 M_{☉}
Radius	3.7 R_{☉}
Luminosity	1,862 L_{☉}
Temperature	18,493 K
Rotational velocity (v sin i)	36.1±8.9 km/s
Age	140 Myr

σ Aql B
Mass	4.6±0.1 M_{☉}
Radius	3.3 R_{☉}
Luminosity	524 L_{☉}
Temperature	15,848 K
Rotational velocity (v sin i)	120 km/s

Other designations
- Hru, σ Aquilae, σ Aql, 44 Aquilae, BD+05 4225, GC 27185, HD 185507, HIP 96665, HR 7474, SAO 124903, PPM 168338, WDS J19392+0524A

Database references
SIMBAD	data

Sigma Aquilae, also named Hru, is an eclipsing binary star system in the equatorial constellation of Aquila. Its Bayer designation is Latinized from σ Aquilae, and abbreviated Sigma Aql or σ Aql. The baseline apparent visual magnitude of the pair is +5.17, which, according to the Bortle Dark-Sky Scale, is bright enough to be seen with the naked eye from suburban skies. Because of the Earth's orbit about the Sun, this system has an annual parallax shift of 4.16 mas. This provides a distance estimate of approximately 780 light-years (240 parsecs). The system is drifting closer to the Sun with a radial velocity of −5 km/s.

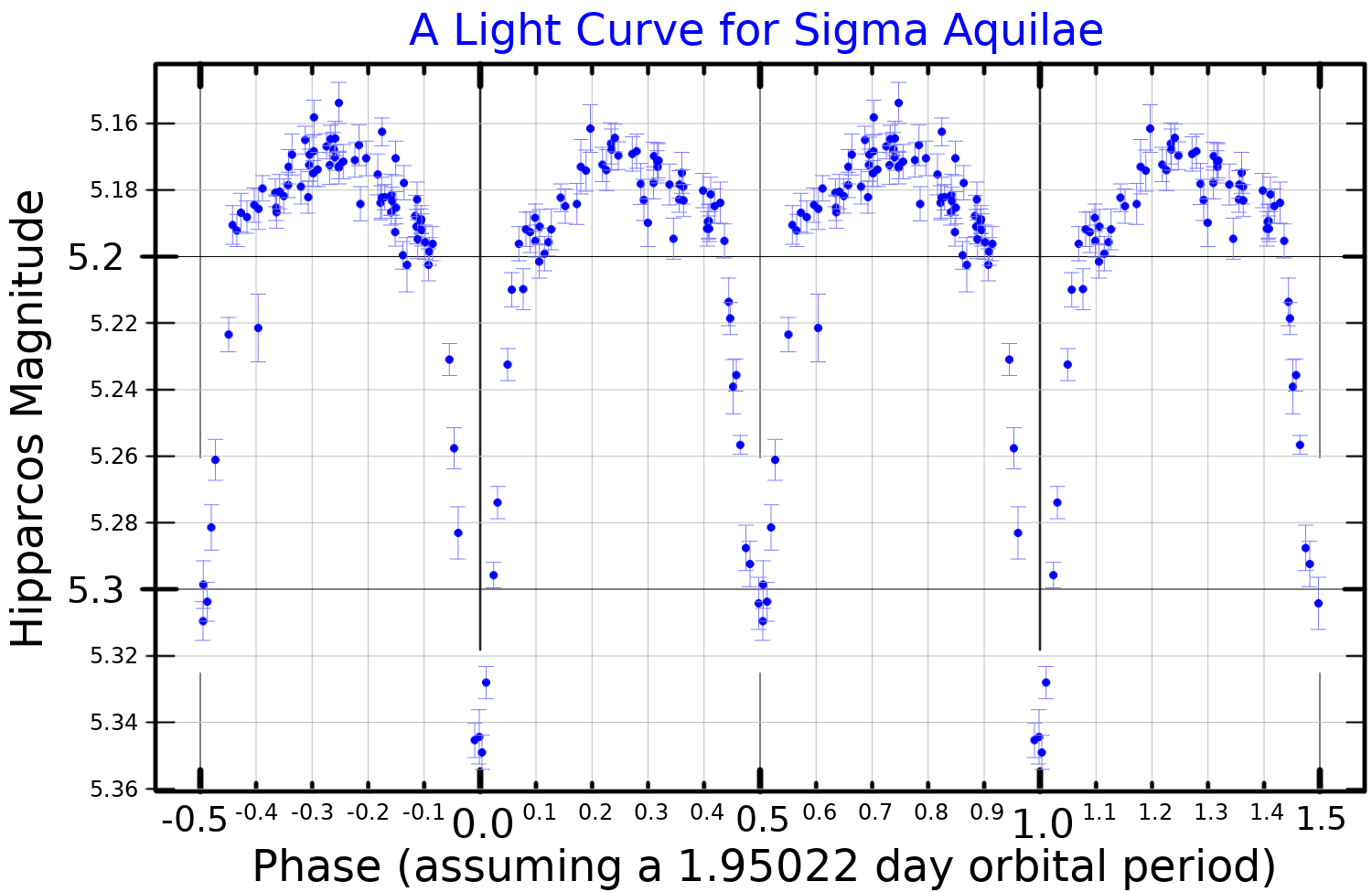
A light curve for Sigma Aquilae, plotted from Hipparcos data

Sigma Aquilae is a double-lined spectroscopic binary system consisting of two intermediate-mass B-type main sequence stars; each has a stellar classification of B3 V. They are detached components, which means the two stars are sufficiently distant from each other that neither fills its Roche lobe. Their close, circular orbit has a period of 1.95 days with a semimajor axis of 14.3 times the radius of the Sun.

Because the orbital plane lies close to the line of sight with the Earth, they form an eclipsing binary system. The two components are each distorted by the gravity of the other star, and their shapes mean that the magnitude of the star system varies constantly even outside of the eclipses, an arrangement known as a Beta Lyrae variable. The brightness of the pair decreases during each eclipse, which occurs with a frequency determined by their orbital period of 1.95028 days. During the eclipse of the primary component the magnitude decreases by 0.20 to a net of 5.37; the eclipse of the secondary component results in a magnitude decrease of 0.10 to a net of 5.27.

The primary component has 5.8 times the mass of the Sun and 3.7 times the Sun's radius. It is radiating 1,862 times the luminosity of the Sun from its photosphere at an effective temperature of 18,493 K. The smaller secondary has 4.6 times the mass, 3.3 times the radius, and 524 times the luminosity of the Sun. Its outer atmosphere has an effective temperature of 15,848 K. This star has a high rate of spin, showing a projected rotational velocity of 120 km/s.

In Bali (Indonesia), Ru or Hru refers to a constellation of an arrow, corresponding to Aquila; the term is derived from Sanskrit. The IAU Working Group on Star Names adopted the name Hru for this star on 18 June 2026.
