= Mu Aquilae =

Star in the constellation Aquila

- Location of μ Aquilae (circled)

Observation data Epoch J2000 Equinox J2000
- Constellation: Aquila
- Right ascension: 19^{h} 34^{m} 05.353^{s}
- Declination: +07° 22′ 44.18″
- Apparent magnitude (V): 4.45

Characteristics
- Evolutionary stage: red clump
- Spectral type: K3-IIIb Fe0.5
- U−B color index: +1.24
- B−V color index: +1.176
- R−I color index: 0.61

Astrometry
Radial velocity (R_{v})	−24.73±0.13 km/s
Proper motion (μ)	RA: +213.280 mas/yr Dec.: −156.953 mas/yr
Parallax (π)	29.4091±0.1441 mas
Distance	110.9 ± 0.5 ly (34.0 ± 0.2 pc)
Absolute magnitude (M_{V})	1.80

Details
Mass	1.16±0.10 M_{☉}
Radius	7.43±0.15 R_{☉}
Luminosity	24.5 L_{☉}
Surface gravity (log g)	2.70±0.06 cgs
Temperature	4,567±79 K
Metallicity [Fe/H]	0.16 dex
Rotational velocity (v sin i)	0.0 km/s
Age	6.71±2.19 Gyr

Other designations
- μ Aql, 38 Aql, BD+07 4132, FK5 1511, GJ 9661, HD 184406, HIP 96229, HR 7429, SAO 124799, LTT 15709

Database references
SIMBAD	data

Mu Aquilae is a single star in the equatorial constellation of Aquila. Its name is a Bayer designation that is Latinized from μ Aquilae, and abbreviated Mu Aql or μ Aql. With an apparent visual magnitude of 4.45, it is visible to the naked eye. The measured annual parallax shift of this star is 29.4 mas, which gives a distance estimate of 110.9 light-years (34.0 parsecs) from Earth. It is drifting closer with a radial velocity of −25 km/s, and displays a relatively high proper motion, traversing the celestial sphere at the rate of 0.264″ per year.

The stellar classification of Mu Aquilae is K3-IIIb Fe0.5, indicating that this is an evolved giant star with a mild overabundance of iron appearing in its spectrum. It belongs to a sub-category of giants called the red clump, which means it is generating energy through the fusion of helium at its core. Compared to the Sun, it has 116% of the mass and has expanded to 7.7 times the size. This inflated outer envelope has an effective temperature of 4,567 K and is radiating 24.5 times the Sun's luminosity. At this heat, Mu Aquilae glows with the orange hue of a K-type star. It is roughly seven billion years old.
