= 42 Aquilae =

Star in the constellation Aquila

Observation data Epoch J2000 Equinox J2000
- Constellation: Aquila
- Right ascension: 19^{h} 37^{m} 47.31788^{s}
- Declination: −04° 38′ 51.5050″
- Apparent magnitude (V): 5.45

Characteristics
- Evolutionary stage: main sequence
- Spectral type: F3 IV/V
- B−V color index: 0.429±0.003

Astrometry
Radial velocity (R_{v})	−37.6±1.8 km/s
Proper motion (μ)	RA: +105.195 mas/yr Dec.: –53.710 mas/yr
Parallax (π)	31.1168±0.0913 mas
Distance	104.8 ± 0.3 ly (32.14 ± 0.09 pc)
Absolute magnitude (M_{V})	2.98

Details
Mass	1.44 M_{☉}
Radius	1.71 R_{☉}
Luminosity	5.5 L_{☉}
Surface gravity (log g)	4.13 cgs
Temperature	6,749 K
Metallicity [Fe/H]	0.17 dex
Rotational velocity (v sin i)	87.0±4.4 km/s
Age	1.283 Gyr

Other designations
- 42 Aql, BD−04°4861, HD 185124, HIP 96556, HR 7460, SAO 143621

Database references
SIMBAD	data

42 Aquilae, abbreviated 42 Aql, is a single star in the equatorial constellation of Aquila. 42 Aquilae is its Flamsteed designation. It is a dim star but visible to the naked eye under suitable viewing conditions, having an apparent visual magnitude of 5.45. 42 Aql is located some 104.8 light years away, as determined from its annual parallax shift of 31.1 mas. it is moving closer to the Earth with a heliocentric radial velocity of −38 km/s, and is predicted to come to within 52 light-years of the Sun in around 752,000 years.

The stellar classification of this star is F3 IV/V, which matches an F-type star with blended spectral traits of a main sequence star and a subgiant star. It is around 1.3 billion years old with a relatively high rate of rotation, having a projected rotational velocity of 87 km/s. The star has 1.44 times the mass of the Sun and is radiating 5.5 times the Sun's luminosity from its photosphere at an effective temperature of 6,749 K. These coordinates are a source of X-ray emission, which is most likely (99.3% chance) coming from the star.
