= List of stars in Aquila =

This is the list of 143 notable stars in the constellation Aquila, sorted by decreasing brightness.

Name	B	F	G.	Var	HD	HIP	RA	Dec	vis. mag.	abs. mag.	Dist. (ly)	Sp. class	Notes
Altair	α	53	86		187642	97649	19^{h} 50^{m} 46.68^{s}	+08° 52′ 02.6″	0.76	2.20	17	A7IV-V	Atair, Al Nesr Al Tair, Vulture Volans; 12th brightest star; nearby; has two optical components; δ Sct variable, ΔV = 0.004^{m}, P = 0.06342 d
γ Aql	γ	50			186791	97278	19^{h} 46^{m} 15.57^{s}	+10° 36′ 47.8″	2.72	−3.03	460	K3II	Tarazed, Tarazad, Reda, Menkib al Nesr, Humerus Vulturis; double star; suspected variable
ζ Aql	ζ	17			177724	93747	19^{h} 05^{m} 24.61^{s}	+13° 51′ 49.4″	2.99	0.96	83	A0Vn	Okab, Deneb el Okab, Denebokab Australis, Woo, Yuë (吳越), Dzeneb al Tair, Cauda (Vulturis) Volantis; triple star
θ Aql	θ	65	117		191692	99473	20^{h} 11^{m} 18.26^{s}	−00° 49′ 17.3″	3.24	−1.48	287	B9.5III	Antinous,, Tseen Foo, Al Mizan III, Thanih Ras al Akab, Secunda Capitis Vulturis; spectroscopic binary; suspected variable
δ Aql	δ	30	46		182640	95501	19^{h} 25^{m} 29.75^{s}	+03° 06′ 52.5″	3.36	2.43	50	F0IV	Guqi, Denebokab, Al Mizan I, Song, Sung, Djenubi Menkib al Nesr, Australior Humerus Vulturis; binary star; suspected variable
λ Aql	λ	16	19		177756	93805	19^{h} 06^{m} 14.95^{s}	−04° 52′ 56.4″	3.43	0.51	125	B9Vn	Al Thalimain
β Aql	β	60	98		188512	98036	19^{h} 55^{m} 18.77^{s}	+06° 24′ 28.6″	3.71	3.03	45	G8IVvar	Alshain, Alschain, Alschairn, Unuk al Ghyrab, Collum Corvi; binary star; suspected variable; triple star; suspected variable
η Aql	η	55	89		187929	97804	19^{h} 52^{m} 28.36^{s}	+01° 00′ 20.4″	3.87	−3.91	1173	F6Ib-G4Ib	Pagru, Al Mizan II; Cepheid variable, V_{max} = 3.48^{m}, V_{min} = 4.39^{m}, P = 7.17664 d
ε Aql	ε	13			176411	93244	18^{h} 59^{m} 37.39^{s}	+15° 04′ 06.5″	4.02	0.65	154	K2III	Arin-majlep, Deneb el Okab, Denebokab Borealis, Woo, Yuë (吳越); triple star
12 Aql	i	12	9		176678	93429	19^{h} 01^{m} 40.84^{s}	−05° 44′ 20.5″	4.02	0.73	149	K1IIIvar	suspected variable
71 Aql	l	71	146		196574	101847	20^{h} 38^{m} 20.27^{s}	−01° 06′ 18.3″	4.31	−1.04	384	G8III SB	spectroscopic binary
ι Aql	ι	41	64		184930	96468	19^{h} 36^{m} 43.28^{s}	−01° 17′ 11.6″	4.36	−0.51	307	B5III	Al Thalimain; double star
μ Aql	μ	38	58		184406	96229	19^{h} 34^{m} 05.23^{s}	+07° 22′ 45.5″	4.45	1.80	111	K3III	multiple star; suspected variable
ν Aql	ν	32	47		182835	95585	19^{h} 26^{m} 31.09^{s}	+00° 20′ 18.9″	4.64	−8.12	11643	F2Ib	double star; suspected variable
ξ Aql	ξ	59	94		188310	97938	19^{h} 54^{m} 14.882^{s}	+08° 27′ 41.23″	4.722	0.74	204	G9IIIb	Libertas, has a planet (b)
69 Aql		69	141		195135	101101	20^{h} 29^{m} 38.96^{s}	−02° 53′ 07.7″	4.91	1.07	191	K2III	
70 Aql		70	144		196321	101692	20^{h} 36^{m} 43.63^{s}	−02° 32′ 59.7″	4.91	−4.24	2203	K5II	
κ Aql	κ	39	63		184915	96483	19^{h} 36^{m} 53.45^{s}	−07° 01′ 38.9″	4.93	−3.32	1455	B0.5III	
26 Aql	f	26	38		181391	95066	19^{h} 20^{m} 32.84^{s}	−05° 24′ 57.1″	4.98	1.61	154	G8III-IV...	spectroscopic binary
4 Aql	(m)	4	2		173370	91975	18^{h} 44^{m} 49.93^{s}	+02° 03′ 36.3″	5.02	−0.78	472	B9V	
36 Aql	e	36	54		183630	95937	19^{h} 30^{m} 39.82^{s}	−02° 47′ 19.9″	5.03	−0.91	502	M1IIIvar	suspected variable
18 Aql		18		Y	178125	93867	19^{h} 06^{m} 58.60^{s}	+11° 04′ 16.7″	5.07	−0.89	507	B8III	Y Aql; double star; eclipsing binary
23 Aql		23	35		180972	94885	19^{h} 18^{m} 32.49^{s}	+01° 05′ 06.3″	5.10	−0.24	381	K2II-IIIvar	triple star
37 Aql	k	37	59		184492	96327	19^{h} 35^{m} 07.25^{s}	−10° 33′ 37.6″	5.12	−0.55	444	G8III	
ο Aql	ο	54			187691	97675	19^{h} 51^{m} 01.50^{s}	+10° 24′ 57.8″	5.12	3.68	63	F8V	multiple star system
21 Aql		21	29	V1288	179761	94477	19^{h} 13^{m} 42.70^{s}	+02° 17′ 37.4″	5.14	−1.33	640	B8II-IIIp(Hg:)	V1288 Aql; double star; α^{2} CVn variable, V_{max} = 5.06^{m}, V_{min} = 5.16^{m}, P = 1.73 d
31 Aql	b	31			182572	95447	19^{h} 24^{m} 57.77^{s}	+11° 56′ 34.3″	5.17	4.27	49	G8IVvar	triple star; suspected variable
σ Aql	σ	44	68		185507	96665	19^{h} 39^{m} 11.64^{s}	+05° 23′ 52.0″	5.18	−1.42	682	B3V + B3V	Hru, β Lyr variable, ΔV = 0.2^{m}, P = 1.95026 d
19 Aql		19	24		178596	94068	19^{h} 08^{m} 59.92^{s}	+06° 04′ 24.2″	5.23	2.03	142	F0III-IV	
11 Aql		11			176303	93203	18^{h} 59^{m} 05.73^{s}	+13° 37′ 21.2″	5.27	1.88	155	F8V	triple star; suspected variable
ω^{1} Aql	ω^{1}	25			180868	94834	19^{h} 17^{m} 49.00^{s}	+11° 35′ 43.4″	5.28	−0.28	422	F0IV	
χ Aql A	χ	47			186203	96957	19^{h} 42^{m} 34.01^{s}	+11° 49′ 35.8″	5.28	−1.53	751	F3V:+...	multiple star system
φ Aql	φ	61			188728	98103	19^{h} 56^{m} 14.23^{s}	+11° 25′ 25.4″	5.28	1.28	206	A1IV	spectroscopic binary; suspected variable
132 G. Aql			132		194013	100541	20^{h} 23^{m} 10.71^{s}	+05° 20′ 35.1″	5.30	0.91	246	G8III-IV	
FF Aql				FF	176155	93124	18^{h} 58^{m} 14.75^{s}	+17° 21′ 39.4″	5.33	−4.07	2470	F5Ia-F8Ia	double star; Cepheid variable, V_{max} = 5.18^{m}, V_{min} = 5.68^{m}, P = 4.47092 d
20 Aql		20	28		179406	94385	19^{h} 12^{m} 40.70^{s}	−07° 56′ 22.2″	5.35	−2.51	1216	B3V	
51 Aql		51	82		187532	97650	19^{h} 50^{m} 46.80^{s}	−10° 45′ 48.9″	5.38	3.27	86	F0V	binary star
14 Aql	g	14	11		176984	93526	19^{h} 02^{m} 54.49^{s}	−03° 41′ 56.4″	5.40	−0.53	499	A1V	double star
15 Aql	h	15	15		177463	93717	19^{h} 04^{m} 57.66^{s}	−04° 01′ 52.9″	5.40	0.41	325	K1III	double star; suspected variable
66 Aql		66	123		192107	99631	20^{h} 13^{m} 13.87^{s}	−01° 00′ 33.4″	5.44	−1.74	888	K5III	
42 Aql		42	65		185124	96556	19^{h} 37^{m} 47.26^{s}	−04° 38′ 51.0″	5.45	2.92	105	F3IV	
27 Aql	d	27	40		181440	95073	19^{h} 20^{m} 35.68^{s}	−00° 53′ 31.8″	5.46	−0.51	509	B9III	
τ Aql	τ	63	107		190327	98823	20^{h} 04^{m} 08.31^{s}	+07° 16′ 40.6″	5.51	−0.53	527	K0III	Tianfu
28 Aql	A	28		V1208	181333	94982	19^{h} 19^{m} 39.35^{s}	+12° 22′ 28.7″	5.53	0.39	347	F0III	V1208 Aql; triple star; δ Sct variable, V_{max} = 5.51^{m}, V_{min} = 5.56^{m}, P = 0.149663 d
					183492	95822	19^{h} 29^{m} 22.12^{s}	+14° 35′ 45.9″	5.57	0.85	286	K0III	
62 Ser	(o)	(62)	(69)		175515	92872	18^{h} 55^{m} 27.44^{s}	+06° 36′ 55.8″	5.58	0.81	293	G9III	69 G. Aquilae, suspected variable
HD 180262					180262	94624	19^{h} 15^{m} 20.09^{s}	+15° 05′ 01.2″	5.58	−0.79	613	G8II-III	double star
22 Aql		22	32		180482	94727	19^{h} 16^{m} 31.02^{s}	+04° 50′ 05.4″	5.59	−0.53	546	A3IV	
58 Aql		58	95		188350	97980	19^{h} 54^{m} 44.77^{s}	+00° 16′ 25.2″	5.60	0.48	345	A0III	
V1291 Aql			90	V1291	188041	97871	19^{h} 53^{m} 18.72^{s}	−03° 06′ 52.2″	5.63	0.99	277	A5p(Sr-Cr-Eu)	α^{2} CVn variable, V_{max} = 5.61^{m}, V_{min} = 5.67^{m}, P = 224.5 d
45 Aql		45	70		185762	96807	19^{h} 40^{m} 43.31^{s}	−00° 37′ 16.7″	5.64	0.93	285	A3IV	double star
HD 180555					180555	94720	19^{h} 16^{m} 26.78^{s}	+14° 32′ 40.6″	5.65	0.36	372	B9.5V	binary star
62 Aql		62	106		190299	98844	20^{h} 04^{m} 23.15^{s}	−00° 42′ 32.5″	5.67	−0.59	582	K4III	
π Aql B	π	52			187260		19^{h} 48^{m} 42.10^{s}	+11° 48′ 55.0″	5.70				component of the π Aql system
57 Aql A		57	93		188293	97966	19^{h} 54^{m} 37.65^{s}	−08° 13′ 38.0″	5.70	0.64	335	B7Vn	double star
14 Sge		(14)			190229	98754	20^{h} 03^{m} 30.01^{s}	+16° 01′ 52.6″	5.73	−0.72	637	B9MNp...	
π Aql	π	52			187259	97473	19^{h} 48^{m} 42.05^{s}	+11° 48′ 57.3″	5.75	−0.46	570	F2V:+...	component of the π Aql system
					182900	95572	19^{h} 26^{m} 24.13^{s}	+13° 01′ 25.2″	5.76	2.03	182	F6III	
56 Aql		56	92		188154	97928	19^{h} 54^{m} 08.27^{s}	−08° 34′ 27.0″	5.76	0.35	394	K5III	double star
35 Aql	c	35	51	V1431	183324	95793	19^{h} 29^{m} 00.99^{s}	+01° 57′ 01.9″	5.79	1.94	192	A0V	V1431 Aql; rapidly oscillating α^{2} CVn variable, ΔV = 0.04^{m}
42 G. Aql			42		181907	95222	19^{h} 22^{m} 21.51^{s}	−00° 15′ 08.2″	5.81	0.58	363	G8III:	
13 G. Aql			13		177178	93580	19^{h} 03^{m} 32.24^{s}	+01° 49′ 08.2″	5.82	2.11	180	A4V	
49 G. Aql			49		183227	95732	19^{h} 28^{m} 20.80^{s}	+02° 55′ 48.2″	5.84	−1.65	1025	B6III	
100 G. Aql			100		189340	98416	19^{h} 59^{m} 47.49^{s}	−09° 57′ 26.2″	5.87	3.92	80	F8V	
5 Aql	(n)	5	3		173654	92117	18^{h} 46^{m} 28.58^{s}	−00° 57′ 41.9″	5.89	1.40	258	A2m	binary star
υ Aql	υ	49	78		186689	97229	19^{h} 45^{m} 39.92^{s}	+07° 36′ 47.4″	5.89	2.22	176	A3IV	
103 G. Aql			103		189695	98526	20^{h} 00^{m} 58.97^{s}	+08° 33′ 28.0″	5.90	−1.30	898	K5III	
10 Aql		10		V1286	176232	93179	18^{h} 58^{m} 46.92^{s}	+13° 54′ 24.4″	5.91	1.55	242	A4p(Eu-Cr-Sr)	V1286 Aql; α^{2} CVn variable, V_{max} = 5.83^{m}, V_{min} = 5.93^{m}, P = 6.05 d
64 Aql		64	113		191067	99171	20^{h} 08^{m} 01.75^{s}	−00° 40′ 40.9″	5.97	2.57	156	K1IV	
HD 185018					185018	96481	19^{h} 36^{m} 52.45^{s}	+11° 16′ 23.5″	5.98	−1.74	1140	G0Ib	multiple star
QS Aql				QS	185936	96840	19^{h} 41^{m} 05.53^{s}	+13° 48′ 56.5″	5.98	−2.54	1646	B5V	double star; Algol variable, V_{max} = 5.93^{m}, V_{min} = 6.06^{m}, P = 2.51329 d
80 G. Aql			80		187195	97499	19^{h} 49^{m} 02.19^{s}	−10° 52′ 14.6″	6.00	1.29	285	K5III	
ω^{2} Aql	ω^{2}	29			181383	95002	19^{h} 19^{m} 53.04^{s}	+11° 32′ 05.7″	6.03	1.37	278	A2V	
131 G. Aql			131		193329	100232	20^{h} 19^{m} 43.24^{s}	−01° 04′ 42.9″	6.05	0.58	405	K0	
8 Aql		8	5	V1729	174589	92524	18^{h} 51^{m} 22.16^{s}	−03° 19′ 04.1″	6.08	1.44	276	F2III	V1729 Aql; Delta Scuti variable
HD 183589			53		183589	95898	19^{h} 30^{m} 10.53^{s}	+02° 54′ 14.7″	6.08	−2.46	1663	K5Ib	multiple star; suspected variable
V923 Aql			55	V923	183656	95929	19^{h} 30^{m} 33.11^{s}	+03° 26′ 39.8″	6.09	−1.26	962	B5.5IIIpe-B8V	γ Cas variable, ΔV = 0.12^{m}
R Aql			22	R	177940	93820	19^{h} 06^{m} 22.25^{s}	+08° 13′ 48.0″	6.09	−2.04	1400	M6.5-9e	Mira variable, V_{max} = 5.5^{m}, V_{min} = 12.0^{m}, P = 270.5 d
137 G. Aql			137		194454	100758	20^{h} 25^{m} 42.53^{s}	−02° 48′ 01.0″	6.10	−0.60	713	K1III:	
V500 Aql				V500			19^{h} 52^{m} 27.98^{s}	+08° 28′ 41.6″	6.1			pec(NOVA) – e+cont	Nova Aquilae; V_{max} = 6.1^{m}, V_{min} = 17.8^{m}
85 G. Aql			85		187660	97687	19^{h} 51^{m} 11.10^{s}	−02° 27′ 39.2″	6.12	−0.09	570	K5III	
68 Aql		68	139		194939	100977	20^{h} 28^{m} 24.89^{s}	−03° 21′ 27.9″	6.12	−0.04	557	B9V	double star
HD 188385			96		188385	97970	19^{h} 54^{m} 40.18^{s}	+07° 08′ 25.3″	6.14	1.60	263	A2V	double star
HD 194244			135		194244	100664	20^{h} 24^{m} 37.49^{s}	+01° 04′ 06.2″	6.14	−0.92	840	B9V	triple star; suspected variable
HD 187923					187923	97767	19^{h} 52^{m} 03.64^{s}	+11° 37′ 44.9″	6.16	3.95	90	G0V	double star; suspected variable
101 G. Aql			101		189322	98385	19^{h} 59^{m} 22.63^{s}	+01° 22′ 39.1″	6.17	−0.69	769	G8III	
34 G. Aql			34		180782	94833	19^{h} 17^{m} 48.18^{s}	+02° 01′ 54.5″	6.19	1.56	275	A1Vn	
6 G. Aql			6		175640	92963	18^{h} 56^{m} 22.66^{s}	−01° 47′ 59.3″	6.20	0.17	525	B9III	
145 G. Aql			145		196426	101746	20^{h} 37^{m} 18.38^{s}	+00° 05′ 49.2″	6.21	−0.26	643	B8IIIp	
7 G. Aql			7		176095	93138	18^{h} 58^{m} 23.71^{s}	+06° 14′ 24.7″	6.22	2.45	185	F5IV	
4 G. Aql			4		174240	92386	18^{h} 49^{m} 37.18^{s}	+00° 50′ 10.4″	6.24	0.01	575	A1V	
12 G. Aql			12		176981	93488	19^{h} 02^{m} 21.56^{s}	+08° 22′ 24.7″	6.25	−0.83	849	K2III	
52 G. Aql			52		183387	95812	19^{h} 29^{m} 18.02^{s}	+00° 14′ 46.0″	6.25	−0.08	603	K2	
ψ Aql	ψ	48			186547	97139	19^{h} 44^{m} 34.19^{s}	+13° 18′ 10.1″	6.25	−0.72	809	B9III-IV	
88 G. Aql			88		187753	97697	19^{h} 51^{m} 17.73^{s}	+09° 37′ 47.8″	6.25	0.92	380	A1m	
HD 191984			120		191984	99585	20^{h} 12^{m} 35.12^{s}	+00° 52′ 01.6″	6.25	−0.08	603	A0	double star
37 G. Aql			37		181122	94916	19^{h} 18^{m} 52.75^{s}	+09° 37′ 05.4″	6.31	0.31	517	G9III	Les Grey
43 G. Aql			43		182038	95281	19^{h} 23^{m} 04.44^{s}	−07° 24′ 02.0″	6.31	0.41	493	K0	
HD 183144					183144	95664	19^{h} 27^{m} 33.90^{s}	+14° 16′ 57.0″	6.31	−0.73	834	B4III	suspected variable
71 G. Aql			71		185966	96917	19^{h} 42^{m} 02.90^{s}	−09° 11′ 36.4″	6.31	1.26	334	K2	
60 G. Aql			60		184573	96356	19^{h} 35^{m} 29.79^{s}	−07° 27′ 36.7″	6.32	1.13	355	K0	
46 Aql		46			186122	96931	19^{h} 42^{m} 12.81^{s}	+12° 11′ 35.8″	6.33	−0.39	720	B9III	
25 G. Aql			25		178744	94149	19^{h} 09^{m} 51.59^{s}	−00° 25′ 41.2″	6.34	−0.80	874	B5Vn	
44 G. Aql			44		182101	95253	19^{h} 22^{m} 48.35^{s}	+09° 54′ 46.4″	6.34	3.58	116	F6V	
					191263	99234	20^{h} 08^{m} 38.28^{s}	+10° 43′ 33.1″	6.34	−2.42	1842	B3IV	
V450 Aql				V450	184313	96204	19^{h} 33^{m} 46.03^{s}	+05° 27′ 56.8″	6.35	−0.75	858	M5III-M8III	semiregular variable, V_{max} = 6.30^{m}, V_{min} = 6.65^{m}, P = 64.20 d
67 G. Aql			67		185423	96630	19^{h} 38^{m} 48.99^{s}	+03° 22′ 53.5″	6.36			B3III	
HD 174569					174569	92475	18^{h} 50^{m} 45.55^{s}	+10° 58′ 35.0″	6.37	−2.41	1863	K5III+...	double star
U Aql			50	U	183344	95820	19^{h} 29^{m} 21.36^{s}	−07° 02′ 38.6″	6.37	−2.07	1590	F5-G1I-II	Cepheid variable, V_{max} = 6.08^{m}, V_{min} = 6.86^{m}, P = 7.02393 d
61 G. Aql			61		184663	96351	19^{h} 35^{m} 25.13^{s}	+02° 54′ 48.5″	6.37	3.25	137	F6IV	
					184944	96428	19^{h} 36^{m} 15.68^{s}	+14° 23′ 28.2″	6.37	1.19	354	K0II-III	
V1472 Aql				V1472	190658	98954	20^{h} 05^{m} 26.53^{s}	+15° 30′ 01.3″	6.37	−0.44	749	M2 comp	eclipsing variable, ΔV = ~0.16^{m}
V1401 Aql		(64)	108	V1401	190390	98910	20^{h} 05^{m} 05.42^{s}	−11° 35′ 57.8″	6.38	−1.58	1273	F1III	64 Sagittarii; semiregular variable, V_{max} = 6.18^{m}, V_{min} = 6.55^{m}
24 Aql		24	36		181053	94913	19^{h} 18^{m} 50.93^{s}	+00° 20′ 20.4″	6.40	0.52	488	K0II-III:..	multiple star
136 G. Aql			136		194263	100672	20^{h} 24^{m} 41.75^{s}	+01° 22′ 07.0″	6.41	−0.71	865	K5	
75 G. Aql			75		186535	97144	19^{h} 44^{m} 41.27^{s}	+08° 43′ 35.7″	6.43	1.00	398	K0	
HD 191104			114		191104	99158	20^{h} 07^{m} 50.34^{s}	+09° 23′ 59.1″	6.43	3.25	141	F3V	double star
					187203	97454	19^{h} 48^{m} 30.51^{s}	+10° 41′ 38.8″	6.44	−2.22	1762	F8Ib-II	
HD 192699			128		192699	99894	20^{h} 16^{m} 06.03^{s}	+04° 34′ 51.3″	6.44	2.30	220	G8IV	Chechia, has a planet (b)
HD 179791			30		179791	94478	19^{h} 13^{m} 44.02^{s}	+05° 30′ 56.3″	6.47	0.15	598	A3V	suspected variable
77 G. Aql			77		186660	97244	19^{h} 45^{m} 52.23^{s}	−02° 53′ 00.4″	6.47	−1.14	1087	B3III	
87 G. Aql			87		187734	97709	19^{h} 51^{m} 26.84^{s}	+04° 05′ 19.1″	6.47			K0...	double star
110 G. Aql			110		190664	99024	20^{h} 06^{m} 12.19^{s}	−04° 04′ 41.2″	6.47	1.37	341	K0	
122 G. Aql			122		192086	99624	20^{h} 13^{m} 04.43^{s}	−00° 19′ 50.9″	6.47	−1.94	1567	K5	
142 G. Aql			142		195617	101339	20^{h} 32^{m} 20.40^{s}	+02° 07′ 58.1″	6.47	−1.23	1132	K2	
V1339 Aql			84	V1339	187567	97607	19^{h} 50^{m} 17.48^{s}	+07° 54′ 08.7″	6.49	−1.90	1552	B2.5IVe	Be star; γ Cas variable, V_{max} = 6.33^{m}, V_{min} = 6.52^{m}
57 Aql B		57			188294	97967	19^{h} 54^{m} 38.06^{s}	−08° 14′ 13.1″	6.49	1.27	361	B8V	component of the 57 Aql system
HD 188405			97		188405	98038	19^{h} 55^{m} 19.49^{s}	−06° 44′ 04.7″	6.49	1.83	279	F2V	double star
V1691 Aql			45	V1691	182475	95453	19^{h} 25^{m} 01.51^{s}	−04° 53′ 04.4″	6.50	1.48	329	A9V	δ Sct variable, ΔV = 0.04^{m}, P = 0.0781 d
V Aql				V	177336	93666	19^{h} 04^{m} 24.15^{s}	−05° 41′ 05.4″	6.78	−1.36	1207	C5,4 – C6,4(N6)	carbon star; semiregular variable, V_{max} = 6.6^{m}, V_{min} = 8.4^{m}, P = 353 d
TT Aql				TT	178359	93990	19^{h} 08^{m} 13.75^{s}	+01° 17′ 55.2″	7.10	−4.84	7951	F6-G5	Cepheid variable, V_{max} = 6.46^{m}, V_{min} = 7.70^{m}, P = 13.7546 d
HD 186641					186641	97233	19^{h} 45^{m} 41.0^{s}	−00° 41′ 48″	7.34	2.2	347	K0	has a planet (b)
V604 Aql				V604			19^{h} 02^{m} 6.33^{s}	−04° 26′ 43.2″	7.6			pec(NOVA) – e+cont	Nova Aquilae; V_{max} = 7.6^{m}, V_{min} = 18.0^{m}
HD 183263					183263	95740	19^{h} 28^{m} 24.57^{s}	+08° 21′ 29.0″	7.86	4.25	172	G2IV	has two planets (b & c)
HD 179079					179079	94256	19^{h} 11^{m} 09.83^{s}	−02° 38′ 18.2″	7.96	3.94	208	G5IV	has a planet (b)
V1703 Aql				V1703	192263	99711	20^{h} 13^{m} 59.85^{s}	−00° 52′ 00.8″	8.10	6.61	65	K2V	Phoenicia, double star; has a planet (b); BY Draconis variable, ΔV = 0.03^{m}, P = 23.98 d
HD 176986					176986	93540	19^{h} 03^{m} 06.0^{s}	−11° 02′ 38″	8.45		86	K2.5V	has two planets (b & c)
HD 181234					181234	95015	19^{h} 20^{m} 00.0^{s}	−09° 19′ 25″	8.59		156	G5	has a planet (b)
Gliese 726					173818	92200	18^{h} 47^{m} 27^{s}	−03° 38′ 23″	8.70	8.17	46.07	K5V	
V1494 Aql				V1494			19^{h} 23^{m} 5.38^{s}	+04° 57′ 20.1″	8.8			pec(NOVA) – e+cont	Nova Aquilae; V_{max} = 5.03^{m}, V_{min} = 16.0^{m}
WASP-74							20^{h} 18^{m} 10.0^{s}	−01° 04′ 33″	9.7	4.31	391	F9	has a transiting planet (b)
HAT-P-41							19^{h} 49^{m} 17.0^{s}	+04° 40′ 21″	11.09	3.63	1014		has a transiting planet (b)
V603 Aql				V603	174107	92316	18^{h} 48^{m} 54.64^{s}	+00° 35′ 02.9″	11.64	4.76	776	pec(NOVA) – e+cont	Nova Aquilae 1918; V_{max} = −1.4^{m}, V_{min} = 12.03^{m}
WASP-80							20^{h} 12^{m} 40.0^{s}	−02° 08′ 44″	11.88	7.99	196		Petra, has a transiting planet (b)
IRC -10414							19^{h} 42^{m} 37.90^{s}	+11° 50′ 31.0″	12.0		6,520	M7 I	
χ Aql B	χ	47			186204		19^{h} 42^{m} 37.90^{s}	+11° 50′ 31.0″	12.30	5.35	800	G0:+A3V	component of the χ Aql system
CoRoT-2							19^{h} 27^{m} 07^{s}	+01° 23′ 02″	12.57	5.29	930	G7V	has a transiting planet (b)
CoRoT-3							19^{h} 28^{m} 13.27^{s}	+00° 07′ 18.6″	13.3	4.16	2200	F3V	has a transiting brown dwarf (b)
SS 433				V1343			19^{h} 11^{m} 49.56^{s}	+04° 58′ 57.6″	14.2		15093	A7Ib	Sanduleak-Stephenson Star; eclipsing X-ray binary
CoRoT-8							19^{h} 26^{m} 21.24^{s}	+01° 25′ 35.2″	14.80	6.89	~1250	K1V	has a transiting planet (b)
CoRoT-10							19^{h} 24^{m} 15.30^{s}	+00° 44′ 46.0″	15.22	7.53	~1130	K1V	has a transiting planet (b)
VB 10							19^{h} 16^{m} 57.62^{s}	+05° 09′ 02.2″	17.30	18.47	19	M8V	van Biesbroeck's Star
V606 Aql				V606			19^{h} 20^{m} 24.3^{s}	−00° 08′ 7.0″			700	pec(NOVA) – e+cont	Nova Aquilae; V_{max} = 5.5^{m}, V_{min} = 17.3^{m}
W50 (nebula)							19^{h} 11^{m} 49^{s}	−04° 59′ 12.0″			16000		Supernova remnant
Table legend: • Name = Proper name • B = Bayer designation • F or/and G. = Flamsteed designation or Gould designation • Var = Variable-star designation • HD = Henry Draper Catalogue designation number • HIP = Hipparcos Catalogue designation number • RA = Right ascension for the Epoch/Equinox J2000.0 • Dec = Declination for the Epoch/Equinox J2000.0 • vis. mag. = visual magnitude (m or m_{v}), also known as apparent magnitude • abs. mag. = absolute magnitude (M_{v}) • Dist. (ly) = Distance in light-years from Earth • Sp. class = Spectral class of the star in the stellar classification system • Notes = Common name(s) or alternate name(s); comments; notable properties [for example: multiple star status, range of variability if it is a variable star, exoplanets, etc.]

== See also ==
- List of stars by constellation
