= V500 =

V500 may refer to:

- V500 Aquilae, a nova
- LG G Pad 8.3, a tablet computer produced by LG Electronics, also known as V500
- Motorola V500, a mobile phone produced by Motorola
