= V1339 Aquilae =

Star in the constellation Aquila

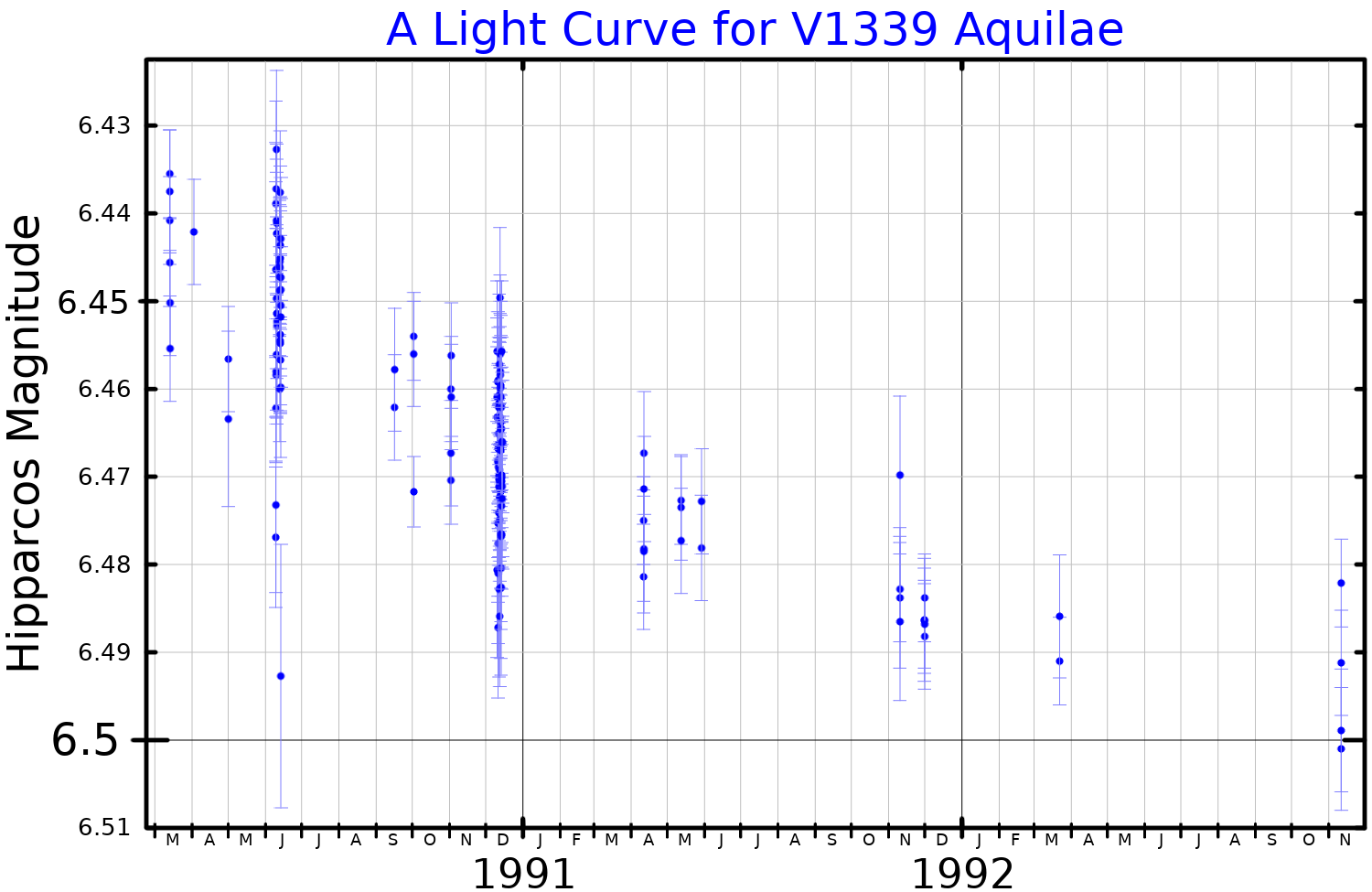
- A light curve for V1339 Aquilae, plotted from Hipparcos data

Observation data Epoch J2000 Equinox ICRS
- Constellation: Aquila
- Right ascension: 19^{h} 50^{m} 17.47881^{s}
- Declination: +07° 54′ 08.6936″
- Apparent magnitude (V): 6.22 to 6.53

Characteristics
- Evolutionary stage: main sequence
- Spectral type: B2.5IVe
- U−B color index: −0.7
- B−V color index: −0.1
- Variable type: Be star

Astrometry
Radial velocity (R_{v})	−30.10±5 km/s
Proper motion (μ)	RA: −1.753±0.033 mas/yr Dec.: −3.171±0.025 mas/yr
Parallax (π)	1.5275±0.0369 mas
Distance	2,140 ± 50 ly (650 ± 20 pc)

Details
Mass	9.5 M_{☉}
Radius	4.64 R_{☉}
Luminosity	6,281 L_{☉}
Surface gravity (log g)	4.08 cgs
Temperature	23,848 K
Rotational velocity (v sin i)	140 km/s
Age	23 Myr

Other designations
- BD+07°4252, HD 187567, HIP 97607, HR 7554, SAO 125116

Database references
SIMBAD	data

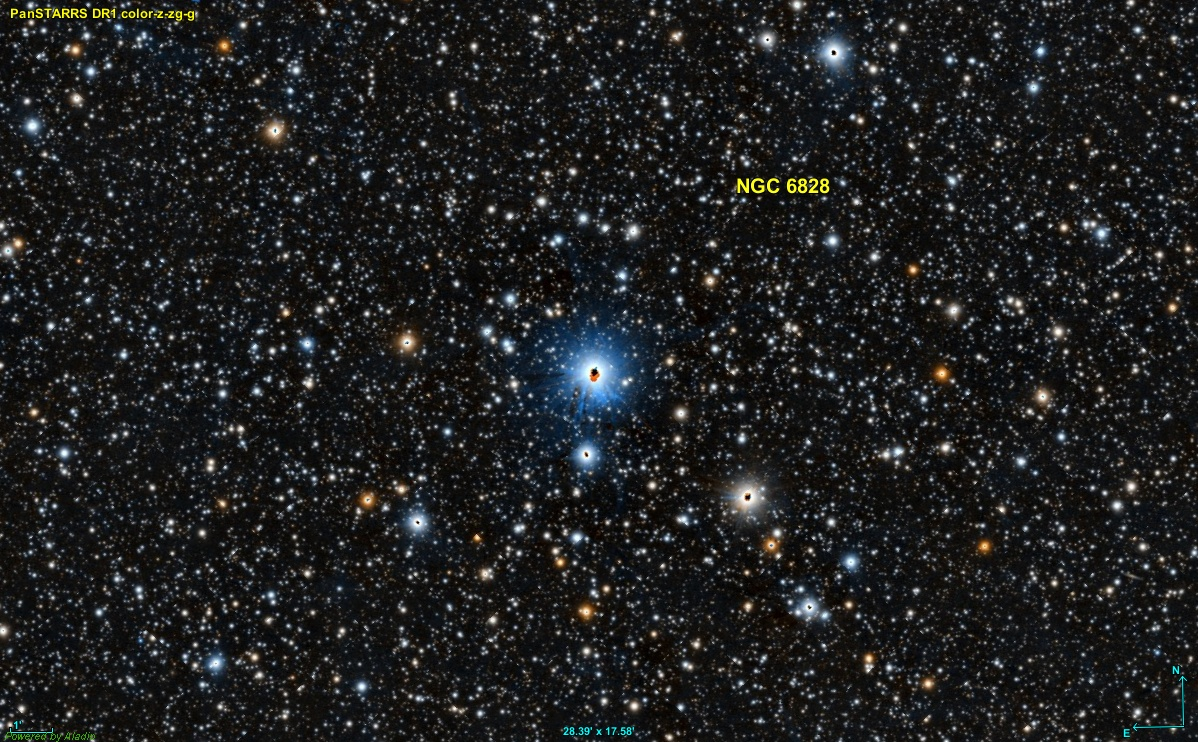
V1339 Aquilae at the centre of the sparse open cluster NGC 6828

V1339 Aquilae, also known as HD 187567, is a Be star in the constellation Aquila. At its brightest its apparent magnitude is 6.22, making it barely visible to the naked eye at a location with very little light pollution. It is located just 8 arc seconds from the center of the open cluster NGC 6828.

V1339 Aquilae was discovered to be a Be star in 1925 by P. W. Merrill, M. L. Humason and C. G. Burwell. The star's variability was detected in 1966 by A. W. J. Cousins, R. Lake and R. H. Stoy, and because of this it was given its variable star designation, V1339 Aquilae, in 1979.

V1339 Aquilae is around 9.5 times as massive as the Sun and has 4.6 times its diameter. Its binary nature was discovered by speckle interferometry in 1983, at the Kitt Peak 4 meter telescope. At the time of these speckle observations the stars were separated by 0.057 arc seconds.
