= HD 73534 =

Star in the constellation Cancer

HD 73534 / Gakyid
Observation data Epoch J2000.0 Equinox ICRS
- Constellation: Cancer
- Right ascension: 08^{h} 39^{m} 15.803^{s}
- Declination: +12° 57′ 37.35″
- Apparent magnitude (V): 8.23

Characteristics
- Evolutionary stage: subgiant
- Spectral type: G5 IV
- Apparent magnitude (B): 9.192
- Apparent magnitude (J): 6.524±0.018
- Apparent magnitude (H): 6.072±0.020
- Apparent magnitude (K): 5.962±0.026
- B−V color index: 0.962±0.021

Astrometry
Radial velocity (R_{v})	+9.76±0.13 km/s
Proper motion (μ)	RA: −114.147 mas/yr Dec.: −93.787 mas/yr
Parallax (π)	11.9576±0.0254 mas
Distance	272.8 ± 0.6 ly (83.6 ± 0.2 pc)
Absolute magnitude (M_{V})	+3.70

Details
Mass	1.228±0.060 M_{☉}
Radius	2.39±0.16 R_{☉}
Luminosity	3.33±0.43 L_{☉}
Surface gravity (log g)	3.780±0.060 cgs
Temperature	5,041±44 K
Metallicity [Fe/H]	0.232±0.030 dex
Rotation	~53 d
Rotational velocity (v sin i)	< 1.0 km/s
Age	7.1±0.8 Gyr

Other designations
- Gakyid, BD+13°1956, HD 73534, HIP 42446, SAO 98004, PPM 125542

Database references
SIMBAD	data
Exoplanet Archive	data

HD 73534 is star with an orbiting exoplanet companion in the northern constellation of Cancer. With an apparent visual magnitude of 8.23, it is too faint to be visible to the naked eye. The distance to this system is 273 light-years based on parallax measurements, and it is drifting further away with a heliocentric radial velocity of +10 km/s.

== Names ==
The star HD 73534 has the proper name Gakyid. The name was selected by Bhutan during the 100th anniversary of the IAU as part of the IAU's NameExoWorlds project. Gakyid means happiness. The planet HD 73534 b is named Drukyul, which means 'land of the thunder dragon', the native name for Bhutan.

== Properties ==
HD 73534 is a G-type subgiant star with a stellar classification of G5 IV. It has consumed the hydrogen at its core and begun to evolve off the main sequence, which is why it is much more luminous than the Sun. The star has a negligible level of magnetic activity in its chromosphere. It has 23% more mass than the Sun, and has expanded to 2.4 times the Sun's radius. The star is radiating 3.3 times the luminosity of the Sun from its photosphere at an effective temperature of 5,041 K. It is roughly 7 billion years old and is spinning slowly with a rotation period of around 53 days.

== Planetary system ==
In August 2009, it was announced that an exoplanet had been discovered using Doppler spectroscopy. It is the first planetary system discovered in Cancer since that of 55 Cancri in April 1996, and the sixth planet, as 55 Cancri has five known planets.

The HD 73534 planetary system
Companion (in order from star)	Mass	Semimajor axis (AU)	Orbital period (days)	Eccentricity	Inclination (°)	Radius
b	≥1.01±0.21 M_{J}	2.95±0.22	1721±36	0 (fixed)	—	—

== See also ==
- HD 179079
- List of extrasolar planets
