= HD 73534 b =

Extrasolar planet in the constellation Cancer

HD 73534 b / Drukyul
Discovery
- Discovered by: Valenti et al.
- Discovery site: Keck Observatory
- Discovery date: August 12, 2009
- Detection method: Radial velocity

Orbital characteristics
- Semi-major axis: 2.95±0.22 AU
- Eccentricity: 0 (fixed)
- Orbital period (sidereal): 1,721±36 d
- Time of periastron: 2,463,014.922(fixed)
- Argument of periastron: 34±10
- Semi-amplitude: 15.5±1.2
- Star: HD 73534

HD 73534 b is an extrasolar planet which orbits the G-type subgiant star HD 73534, located approximately 272 light-years away in the constellation Cancer. It is at least 15% more massive than Jupiter and orbits at an average distance of 3.15 AU and takes 4.9 years to complete the orbit in a nearly circular path with an eccentricity similar to Jupiter. This planet was detected by radial velocity method on August 12, 2009.

The planet HD 73534 b is named Drukyul. The name was selected by Bhutan as part of the NameExoWorlds campaigns during the 100th anniversary of the IAU. Drukyul (འབྲུག་ཡུལ) means "land of the thunder dragon", the native name of Bhutan.

== See also ==
- Exoplanet
- Cancer in Chinese astronomy
- Lists of planets
- GJ 1132 b, rocky exoplanet with a confirmed atmosphere
- Mu Arae c, at constellation Ara
- Planetary system
