= V923 Aquilae =

Binary star system in the constellation Aquila

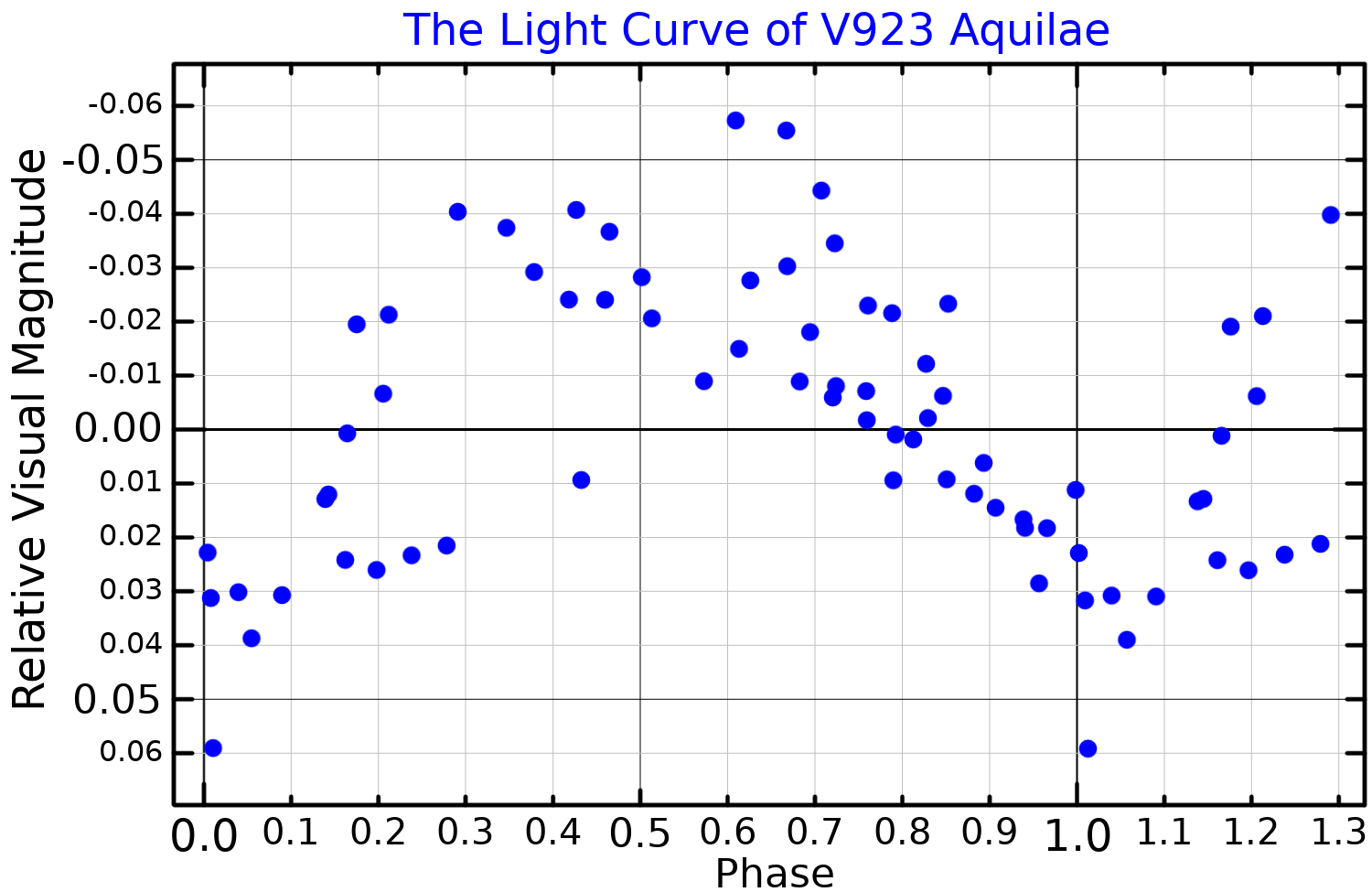
- A photoelectric (yellow) light curve for V923 Aquilae, plotted from data presented by Lynds (1960). The length of a full phase cycle is 0.8518 days.

Observation data Epoch J2000 Equinox ICRS
- Constellation: Aquila
- Right ascension: 19^{h} 30^{m} 33.12199^{s}
- Declination: +03° 26′ 39.8583″
- Apparent magnitude (V): 6.06; 5.98 to 6.18

Characteristics
- Evolutionary stage: Main sequence
- Spectral type: B7III
- U−B color index: −0.31
- B−V color index: −0.019±0.008
- Variable type: Be star

Astrometry
Radial velocity (R_{v})	−26.0±7.4 km/s
Proper motion (μ)	RA: 11.717 mas/yr Dec.: 3.089 mas/yr
Parallax (π)	3.6705±0.0607 mas
Distance	890 ± 10 ly (272 ± 5 pc)
Absolute magnitude (M_{V})	−0.87

Details

Primary
Mass	6.2±0.3 M_{☉}
Luminosity	1517+158 −143 L_{☉}
Surface gravity (log g)	3.64±0.21 cgs
Temperature	16,580±400 K
Rotational velocity (v sin i)	275±17 km/s

Secondary
Mass	~0.5 M_{☉}

Other designations
- V923 Aql, BD+03°4043, HD 183656, HIP 95929, HR 7415, SAO 0124704

Database references
SIMBAD	data

V923 Aquilae is a variable binary star system in the equatorial constellation of Aquila. It has the designation HD 183656 from the Henry Draper Catalogue; V932 Aql is the variable star designation. The system is dimly visible to the naked eye with an apparent visual magnitude that fluctuates around 6.06. It is located at a distance of approximately 890 light years from the Sun based on parallax, but is drifting closer with a radial velocity of around −26 km/s.

This system was first identified as a likely spectroscopic binary by W. E. Harper in 1937, who noted it showed "narrow intense lines of peculiar spectrum". P. W. Merrill and C. G. Burwell identified it as a shell star in 1949. Merrill and A. L. Lowen showed in 1953 that the shell displayed large radial velocity variations. A photometric study by C. R. Lynds in 1960 showed the system varied in brightness with an amplitude of more than 0.1 in magnitude and a characteristic period of 0.85 days, although it does not behave periodically over long time intervals.

A more thorough investigation by P. Koubský and associates in 1989 using long-term radial velocity measurements determined this is a spectroscopic binary with an orbital period of 214.75 days. There is also an overlaying long-term cyclical variation of changing amplitude and period. The modelled binary system shows a primary with a class of around B5–7e and a low mass secondary separated by around 250 times the radius of the Sun (250 R_{☉}). They hypothesized that the long-term variation was due to an envelope created by a mass transfer from the secondary component to the primary. However, the mass transfer concept was later brought into question and remains unverified as of 2004.
