= Pi Aquilae =

Star in the constellation Aquila

- Location of π Aquilae (circled)

Observation data Epoch J2000 Equinox ICRS
- Constellation: Aquila
- Right ascension: 19^{h} 48^{m} 42.059^{s}
- Declination: +11° 48′ 57.22″
- Apparent magnitude (V): 5.85 (6.47 + 6.75)

Characteristics
- Spectral type: G8 III: + A1 V

Astrometry

π Aql A
Radial velocity (R_{v})	+12.6 km/s
Proper motion (μ)	RA: +17.838 mas/yr Dec.: −9.891 mas/yr
Parallax (π)	6.3883±0.0342 mas
Distance	511 ± 3 ly (156.5 ± 0.8 pc)
Absolute magnitude (M_{V})	−0.22

Details

π Aql A
Luminosity	108 L_{☉}
Temperature	5,937+1,255 −569 K

π Aql B
Radius	10.9^{+0.5}_{−0.9} R_{☉}
Luminosity	74.3±0.9 L_{☉}
Surface gravity (log g)	4.5 cgs
Temperature	5,128^{+226}_{−105} K

Other designations
- π Aql, 52 Aquilae, BD+11 3994, HIP 97473, HR 7544, SAO 105282, WDS J19487+1149A
- A: HD 187259
- B: HD 187260

Database references
SIMBAD	data
- A
- B

Pi Aquilae is a binary star system in the equatorial constellation of Aquila, about 3° to the north of the bright star Altair. Its name is a Bayer designation that is Latinised from π Aquilae, and abbreviated Pi Aql or π Aql. The apparent visual magnitude of the system is 5.85, making it faintly visible to the naked eye from dark suburban skies. Based upon an annual parallax shift of 6.39 mas, the distance to this system is approximately 511 light-years (157 parsecs).

The binary nature of this system was first discovered by William Herschel in 1785. The primary component is a magnitude 6.47 giant star with a stellar classification of G8 III:. A companion star at an angular separation of 1.437 arcseconds is an A-type main-sequence star with a classification of A1 V. It is slightly fainter, with an apparent magnitude of 6.75.
