= 57 Aquilae =

Double star in the constellation Aquila

Observation data Epoch J2000 Equinox ICRS
- Constellation: Aquila
- 57 Aql A
- Right ascension: 19^{h} 54^{m} 37.65152^{s}
- Declination: −08° 13′ 38.2390″
- Apparent magnitude (V): 5.70
- 57 Aql B
- Right ascension: 19^{h} 54^{m} 38.06165^{s}
- Declination: −08° 14′ 13.3762″
- Apparent magnitude (V): 6.48

Characteristics
- Spectral type: B7 Vn + B8 V
- U−B color index: −0.49/−0.27
- B−V color index: −0.08/−0.04

Astrometry

57 Aql A
Radial velocity (R_{v})	−6 km/s
Proper motion (μ)	RA: +6.61 mas/yr Dec.: −25.75 mas/yr
Parallax (π)	6.76±0.37 mas
Distance	480 ± 30 ly (148 ± 8 pc)

57 Aql B
Radial velocity (R_{v})	−5 km/s
Proper motion (μ)	RA: +2.13 mas/yr Dec.: −30.77 mas/yr
Parallax (π)	6.42±0.58 mas
Distance	510 ± 50 ly (160 ± 10 pc)

Details

57 Aql A
Rotational velocity (v sin i)	190 km/s

57 Aql B
Rotational velocity (v sin i)	160 km/s

Other designations
- 57 Aql A: BD−08 5154, HD 188293, HIP 97966, HR 7593, SAO 143898
- 57 Aql B: BD−08 5155, HD 188294, HIP 97967, HR 7594, SAO 143899

Database references
SIMBAD	57 Aql
- 57 Aql A
- 57 Aql B

57 Aquilae (abbreviated 57 Aql) is a double star in the constellation of Aquila. 57 Aquilae is its Flamsteed designation. The primary star has an apparent visual magnitude of 5.70, while the secondary is magnitude 6.48. The pair have an angular separation of 35.624 arcseconds and probably form a wide binary star system. The estimated distance of the first component is 480 light-years (150 parsecs), while the second is at 510 light-years (160 parsecs). However, the margin of errors for their respective distance estimates overlap, indicating a probability that they are actually located much closer to each other. Both stars are massive, B-type main sequence stars with rapid rotation rates.
