= HD 187923 =

Star in the constellation Aquila

Observation data Epoch J2000 Equinox ICRS
- Constellation: Aquila
- Right ascension: 19^{h} 52^{m} 03.43838^{s}
- Declination: +11° 37′ 41.9723″
- Apparent magnitude (V): 6.148

Characteristics
- Evolutionary stage: subgiant
- Spectral type: G0 V
- U−B color index: +0.12
- B−V color index: +0.65
- Variable type: suspected

Astrometry
Radial velocity (R_{v})	−20.7±0.2 km/s
Proper motion (μ)	RA: −344.042 mas/yr Dec.: −334.600 mas/yr
Parallax (π)	37.0027±0.0269 mas
Distance	88.14 ± 0.06 ly (27.03 ± 0.02 pc)
Absolute magnitude (M_{V})	3.94

Details
Mass	1.28±0.17 or 1.02 M_{☉}
Radius	1.44±0.04 R_{☉}
Luminosity	2.09+0.10 −0.09 L_{☉}
Surface gravity (log g)	4.23 cgs
Temperature	5,774 K
Metallicity [Fe/H]	−0.11 dex
Rotational velocity (v sin i)	0.1 km/s
Age	8.8±0.7 or 10.2 Gyr

Other designations
- NSV 12490, BD+11°4019, GJ 4126, HD 187923, HIP 97767, HR 7569, SAO 105348, WDS J19521+1138A, LTT 15805

Database references
SIMBAD	data

HD 187923 is a suspected variable star in the equatorial constellation of Aquila. It is a dim star that is just visible to the naked eye, having an apparent visual magnitude of 6.148. Based upon an annual parallax shift of 37.03 mas, it is located 88 light years away. The star is moving closer to the Earth with a heliocentric radial velocity of −20.7 km/s. It has a relatively high proper motion, traversing the celestial sphere at the rate of 0.480″ per year.

This is an ordinary G-type main-sequence star with a stellar classification of G0 V. It has some similarities to the Sun, and thus is considered a solar analog. Brewer et al. (2016) estimate the star has 1.3 times the mass of the Sun and 1.44 times the Sun's radius. It is thought to be around 9 billion years old and is spinning slowly with a projected rotational velocity of 0.1 km/s. The star is radiating double the Sun's luminosity from its photosphere at an effective temperature of 5,774 K. Casagrande et al. (2011) gave a much lower mass estimate of 1.02 times the Sun's mass with an age of around 10.2 billion years.
