= CoRoT-8b =

Extrasolar planet in the constellation Aquila

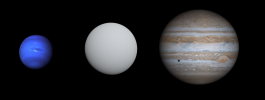
- CoRoT-8b compared to Jupiter and Neptune

Discovery
- Discovered by: Borde et al.
- Discovery site: CoRoT space telescope
- Discovery date: 12 April 2010
- Detection method: Transit

Orbital characteristics
- Semi-major axis: 0.0636 ± 0.0014 AU (9.51 ± 0.21 million km)
- Eccentricity: <0.19
- Orbital period (sidereal): 6.212445±0.000007 d
- Inclination: 88.18°±0.08°
- Time of periastron: 2,454,239.03317±0.00049 JD
- Semi-amplitude: 27.6+5.8 −4.7 m/s
- Star: CoRoT-8

Physical characteristics
- Mean radius: 0.619+0.016 −0.017 R_{J}
- Mass: 0.218±0.034 M_{J}
- Mean density: 1.1±0.2 g/cm^{3}
- Temperature: 870 ± 14 K (596.9 ± 14.0 °C; 1,106.3 ± 25.2 °F)

CoRoT-8b is a transiting exoplanet orbiting the K-type main-sequence star CoRoT-8 1,050 light-years away in the equatorial constellation Aquila. The planet was discovered in April 2010 by the CoRoT telescope.

== Discovery ==
This planet was discovered using the transit method, which detects planet via eclipses. The discovery paper's abstract states that CoRoT-8b is extremely dense compared to Saturn.

== Properties ==
CoRoT-8b has 21.8% Jupiter's mass, and due to its close orbit, a radius 61.9% that of Jupiter. This classifies the planet as a hot Saturn. Despite the bloated radius, the planet is extremely dense, with it being 1.1 times greater than water's; CoRoT-8b has a temperature of 870 K from its six-day orbit.
