= HD 179791 =

Star in the constellation Aquila

Observation data Epoch J2000 Equinox ICRS
- Constellation: Aquila
- Right ascension: 19^{h} 13^{m} 44.03146^{s}
- Declination: +05° 30′ 56.1725″
- Apparent magnitude (V): 6.48

Characteristics
- Evolutionary stage: main sequence
- Spectral type: A3 V
- U−B color index: +0.10
- B−V color index: +0.09
- Variable type: suspected

Astrometry
Radial velocity (R_{v})	+16.2 km/s
Proper motion (μ)	RA: +6.819 mas/yr Dec.: −9.809 mas/yr
Parallax (π)	5.2966±0.0569 mas
Distance	616 ± 7 ly (189 ± 2 pc)
Absolute magnitude (M_{V})	0.66

Details
Mass	2.55±0.15 M_{☉}
Radius	2.5 R_{☉}
Luminosity	65.8+21.0 −16.0 L_{☉}
Temperature	8912+166 −162 K
Rotational velocity (v sin i)	196 km/s

Other designations
- NSV 11827, BD+05°4081, HD 179791, HIP 94478, HR 7288, SAO 124410

Database references
SIMBAD	data

HD 179791 is suspected variable star in the equatorial constellation of Aquila. It is a challenge to see with the naked eye even under good viewing conditions, having an apparent visual magnitude of 6.48. The distance to HD 179791 can be estimated from its annual parallax shift of 5.3 mas, which yields a value of 616 light years. It is moving further from the Earth with a heliocentric radial velocity of +16 km/s. Astrometric measurements of the star show changes in motion that may indicate it is a member of a close binary system.

This is an A-type main-sequence star with a stellar classification of A3 V. It is a suspected chemically peculiar star and formerly a candidate Lambda Boötis star. The status as a Lambda Boötis star was reviewed and changed to non-member in 2015. It is spinning rapidly with a projected rotational velocity of 196 km/s. The star has 2.55 times the mass of the Sun and about 2.5 times the Sun's radius. It is radiating 66 times the Sun's luminosity from its photosphere at an effective temperature of 8,912 K.
