= HD 191984 =

Double star in the constellation Aquila

Observation data Epoch J2000 Equinox J2000
Constellation	Aquila
- A
Right ascension	20^{h} 12^{m} 35.12414^{s}
Declination	+00° 52′ 01.3827″
- Apparent magnitude (V): 6.246
- B
Right ascension	20^{h} 12^{m} 35.04446^{s}
Declination	+00° 51′ 58.9646″
- Apparent magnitude (V): 6.246

Characteristics
- Evolutionary stage: main sequence + main sequence
- Spectral type: B9p CR(EU SR) + A0
- U−B color index: −0.033
- B−V color index: +0.090

Astrometry

A
Radial velocity (R_{v})	−19.0 km/s
Proper motion (μ)	RA: +1.577 mas/yr Dec.: −21.256 mas/yr
Parallax (π)	6.4490±0.0534 mas
Distance	506 ± 4 ly (155 ± 1 pc)

B
Radial velocity (R_{v})	−21.0 km/s
Proper motion (μ)	RA: +4.733 mas/yr Dec.: −17.988 mas/yr
Parallax (π)	6.5263±0.0318 mas
Distance	500 ± 2 ly (153.2 ± 0.7 pc)

Details

A
Mass	2.6 M_{☉}
Radius	2.5 R_{☉}
Luminosity	60 L_{☉}
Surface gravity (log g)	3.96 cgs
Temperature	10,497 K
Metallicity [Fe/H]	−1.00 dex
Rotational velocity (v sin i)	150 km/s
Age	262 Myr

B
Mass	2.2 M_{☉}
Radius	2.3 R_{☉}
Luminosity	31 L_{☉}
Surface gravity (log g)	3.87 cgs
Temperature	8,801 K
Metallicity [Fe/H]	−1.42 dex
Age	574 Myr

Other designations
- BD+00°4444, HD 191984, HIP 99585, HR 7717.

Database references
SIMBAD	data
- A
- B

HD 191984 is a double star in the equatorial constellation of Aquila. As of 2011, the components have an angular separation of 2.52″ along a position angle of 205.7°.
