= HD 182475 =

Star in the constellation Aquila

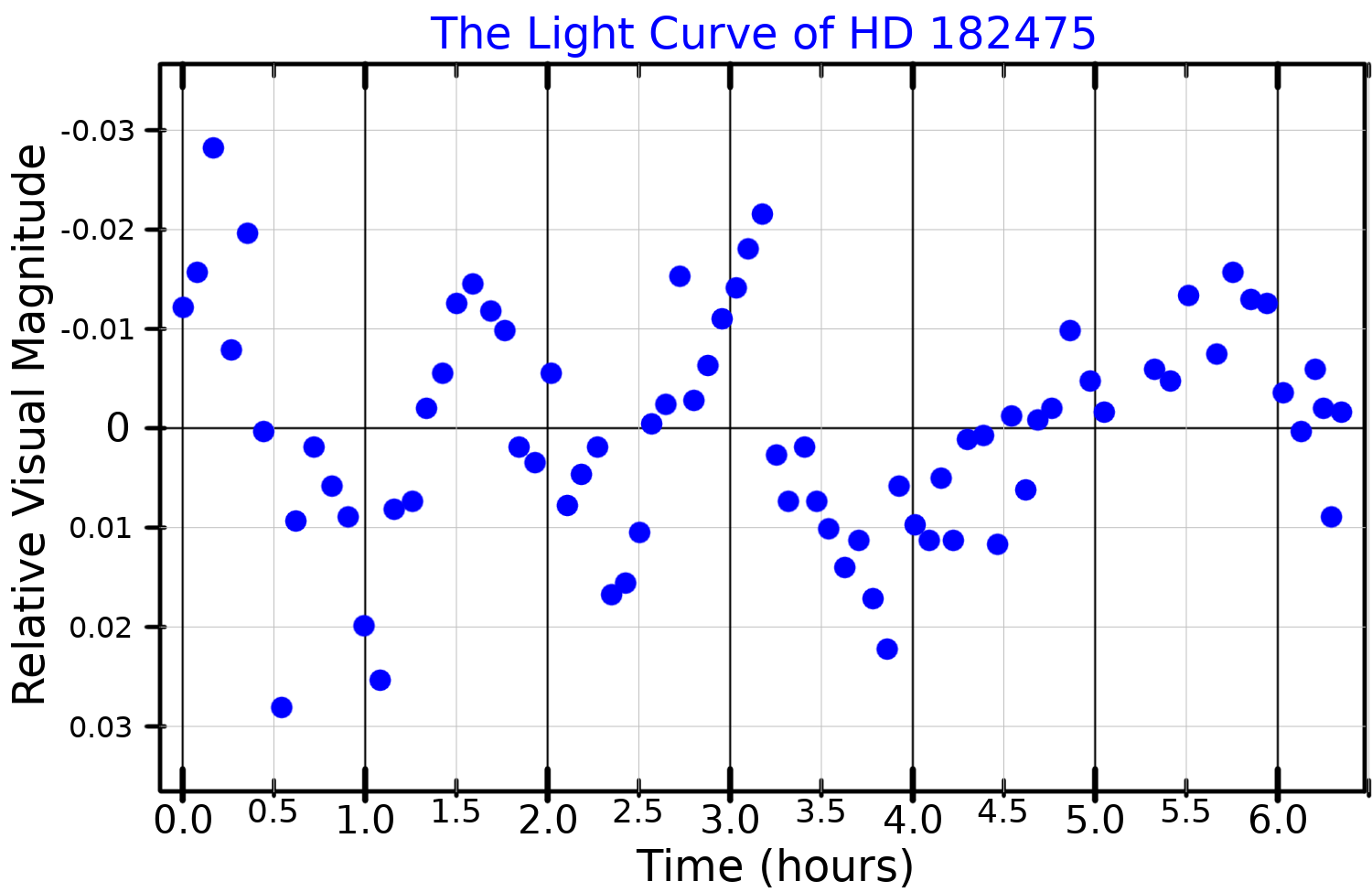
- A visual band light curve for HD 182475, adapted from Poretti et al. (2003)

Observation data Epoch J2000 Equinox ICRS
- Constellation: Aquila
- Right ascension: 19^{h} 25^{m} 01.53339^{s}
- Declination: −04° 53′ 04.3738″
- Apparent magnitude (V): 6.51

Characteristics
- Spectral type: A9V
- U−B color index: +0.09
- B−V color index: +0.33
- Variable type: δ Sct

Astrometry
Proper motion (μ)	RA: 36.65 mas/yr Dec.: 2.67 mas/yr
Parallax (π)	9.25±1.32 mas
Distance	approx. 350 ly (approx. 110 pc)
Absolute magnitude (M_{V})	+1.38

Details
Luminosity	23 L_{☉}
Temperature	6,907 K
Rotational velocity (v sin i)	141 km/s

Other designations
- V1691 Aql, BD−05°4964, HD 180555, HIP 95453, HR 7366, SAO 143373

Database references
SIMBAD	data

HD 182475 is a Delta Scuti variable star in the equatorial constellation of Aquila. Its apparent magnitude is 6.5, making it barely visible to the naked eye under ideal observing conditions.

Gerald Hildebrandt discovered the star is a variable star in 1991, and reported the discovery in 1992. It was given its variable star designation, V1691 Aquarii, in 2006.
