= HD 188405 =

Binary star system in the constellation Aquila

Observation data Epoch J2000 Equinox ICRS
- Constellation: Aquila
- Right ascension: 19^{h} 55^{m} 19.50021^{s}
- Declination: −06° 44′ 05.2223″
- Apparent magnitude (V): 6.51 (6.94 + 7.98)‍

Characteristics
- Spectral type: F2V
- U−B color index: +0.05
- B−V color index: +0.39

Astrometry
Radial velocity (R_{v})	−13.10 km/s
Proper motion (μ)	RA: +16.58 mas/yr Dec.: −60.18 mas/yr
Parallax (π)	12.22±0.84 mas
Distance	270 ± 20 ly (82 ± 6 pc)
Absolute magnitude (M_{V})	+1.94

Orbit
Period (P)	425±22 yr
Semi-major axis (a)	1.085±0.024″
Eccentricity (e)	0.9414±0.0020
Inclination (i)	103.05±0.84°
Longitude of the node (Ω)	264.03±0.77°
Periastron epoch (T)	B 1974.28±0.23
Argument of periastron (ω) (secondary)	327.9±1.7°

Details

HD 188405 A
Mass	1.4 M_{☉}
Radius	2.8 R_{☉}
Luminosity	13 L_{☉}
Temperature	6,646 K

Other designations
- BD−07°5102, HD 188405, HIP 98038, HR 7599, SAO 143911

Database references
SIMBAD	data

HD 188405 is a binary star in the equatorial constellation of Aquila. The pair have an orbital period of roughly 425 years and an angular separation of 1.085″.
