= HD 194244 =

Star in the constellation Aquila

Observation data Epoch J2000 Equinox ICRS
- Constellation: Aquila
- Right ascension: 20^{h} 24^{m} 37.49817^{s}
- Declination: +01° 04′ 06.2574″
- Apparent magnitude (V): 6.14

Characteristics
- Evolutionary stage: main sequence
- Spectral type: B9V
- U−B color index: −0.14
- B−V color index: −0.04

Astrometry
Radial velocity (R_{v})	−9.6±0.9 km/s
Proper motion (μ)	RA: +7.834 mas/yr Dec.: +4.935 mas/yr
Parallax (π)	4.0349±0.0.428 mas
Distance	808 ± 0 ly (248 ± 0 pc)
Absolute magnitude (M_{V})	−0.80

Details
Mass	2.5 M_{☉}
Radius	4.9 R_{☉}
Luminosity	238 L_{☉}
Surface gravity (log g)	3.48 cgs
Temperature	10,233 K
Metallicity [Fe/H]	−0.22 dex
Rotation	27.15
Rotational velocity (v sin i)	222 km/s
Age	243 Myr

Other designations
- BD+00°4495, HD 194244, HIP 100664, HR 7803, SAO 125769

Database references
SIMBAD	data

HD 194244 is a variable Be star in the equatorial constellation of Aquila. With an apparent magnitude of 6.14, according to the Bortle scale it is faintly visible to the naked eye from rural skies on a dark night.
