= HD 174569 =

Binary star in the constellation Aquila

Observation data Epoch J2000 Equinox ICRS
- Constellation: Aquila
- Right ascension: 18^{h} 50^{m} 45.5515^{s}
- Declination: +10° 58′ 34.997″
- Apparent magnitude (V): 6.36

Characteristics
- Spectral type: K5III + K3III-IV
- U−B color index: +1.63
- B−V color index: +1.44

Astrometry

A
Radial velocity (R_{v})	−25.61±0.14 km/s
Proper motion (μ)	RA: +8.168 mas/yr Dec.: +5.959 mas/yr
Parallax (π)	4.4674±0.0200 mas
Distance	730 ± 3 ly (224 ± 1 pc)

B
Radial velocity (R_{v})	−27 km/s
Proper motion (μ)	RA: +8.623 mas/yr Dec.: +6.146 mas/yr
Parallax (π)	4.4157±0.0232 mas
Distance	739 ± 4 ly (226 ± 1 pc)

Details

A
Mass	1.2 M_{☉}
Radius	37 R_{☉}
Luminosity	318 L_{☉}
Surface gravity (log g)	1.52 cgs
Temperature	3,922 K
Metallicity [Fe/H]	0.51 dex

B
Mass	1.4 M_{☉}
Radius	18 R_{☉}
Luminosity	141 L_{☉}
Surface gravity (log g)	2.46 cgs
Temperature	4,808 K
Metallicity [Fe/H]	−0.09 dex

Other designations
- BD+10°3685, HD 174569, HIP 92475, HR 7099, SAO 104170.

Database references
SIMBAD	data
- A
- B

HD 174569 is a spectroscopic binary star system in the equatorial constellation of Aquila. Based on stellar parallax measurements by Gaia, it is about 730-740 light-years (400 parsecs) away.

Both components are giant stars that exhausted their hydrogen supply. Star A has a class K5III, while star B has a class K3III-IV.
