= Chi Aquilae =

Binary star system in the constellation Aquila

χ Aquilae
- Location of χ Aquilae (circled)

Observation data Epoch J2000 Equinox ICRS
- Constellation: Aquila
- Right ascension: 19^{h} 42^{m} 34.00828^{s}
- Declination: +11° 49′ 35.7023″
- Apparent magnitude (V): 5.292 (5.80 + 6.68)

Characteristics
- Spectral type: G2 Ib-II + B5 V
- U−B color index: +0.01
- B−V color index: +0.56

Astrometry
Radial velocity (R_{v})	−17.37±0.38 km/s
Proper motion (μ)	RA: 1.75 mas/yr Dec.: −10.11 mas/yr
Parallax (π)	3.82±0.51 mas
Distance	approx. 900 ly (approx. 260 pc)
Absolute magnitude (M_{V})	−1.53 (−2.1 + −1)

Details
Luminosity	420 L_{☉}
Temperature	5,545 K
Metallicity [Fe/H]	−0.39±0.10 dex
Rotational velocity (v sin i)	3.6 km/s

Other designations
- χ Aql, χ Aquilae, 47 Aquilae, BD+11 3955, HD 186203, HIP 96957, HR 7497, SAO 105168, ADS 12808

Database references
SIMBAD	data

Chi Aquilae is a binary star system in the equatorial constellation of Aquila, the eagle. Its name is a Bayer designation that is Latinized from χ Aquilae, and abbreviated Chi Aql or χ Aql. This system is bright enough to be seen with the naked eye at a combined apparent visual magnitude of +5.29. Based upon parallax measurements made during the Hipparcos mission, Chi Aquilae is at a distance of approximately 900 light-years (280 parsecs) from Earth.

The two components of χ Aquilae can be separated by spectrum and their relative brightness has been measured, but their other properties are uncertain. The cooler component displays an intermediate spectra between a G2 bright giant and a supergiant, and is visually brighter than the hot component, so it is treated as the primary. The hot component has a stellar classification of B5.5V, matching a B-type main-sequence star.

The absolute magnitude of the primary is −2.1, while that of the secondary is −1. However, the brightness difference between a G2 supergiant and a B5.5 dwarf is expected to be larger. It is unclear whether the primary is not a supergiant or the secondary is brighter than a main-sequence star. As of 2004, the secondary is located at an angular separation of 0.418 arcseconds along a position angle of 76.7° from the primary. The separation and position angle are both decreasing.
