= V606 Aquilae =

1899 nova in the constellation Aquila

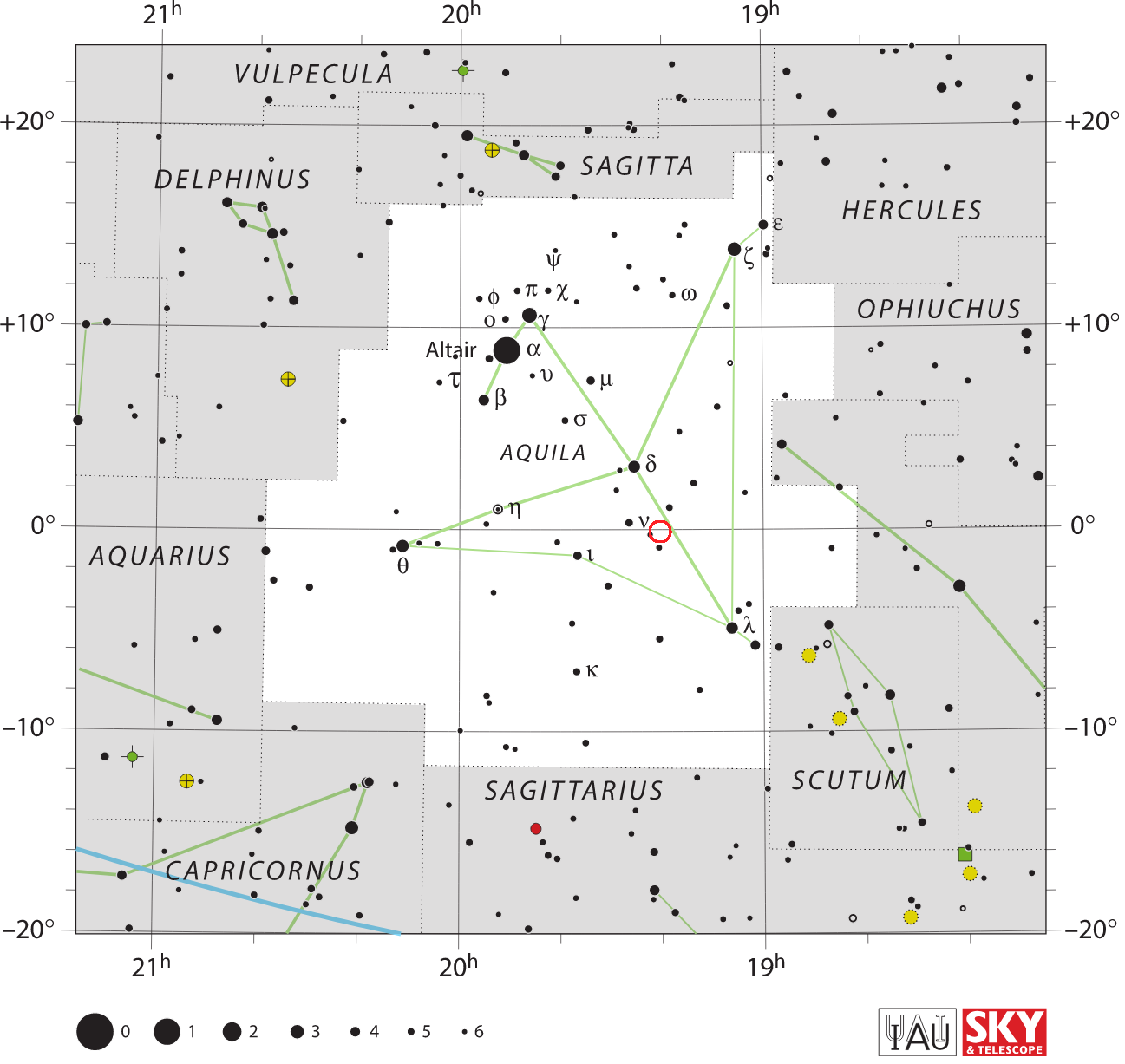
- Location of V606 Aquilae (circled in red)

Observation data Epoch J2000.0 Equinox ICRS
- Constellation: Aquila
- Right ascension: 19^{h} 20^{m} 24.3^{s}
- Declination: −00° 08′ 07″
- Apparent magnitude (V): 6.7p — 17.3p

Characteristics
- Variable type: Classical nova, dwarf nova

Other designations
- Nova Aql 1899, V606 Aql, HD 181419, AAVSO 1915-00, IC 4850

Database references
SIMBAD	data

V606 Aquilae was a nova, which lit up in the constellation Aquila in 1899. The brightest reported magnitude for this nova was apparent magnitude 5.5, making it a naked eye object. It was discovered by Williamina Fleming on a photographic plate (one of the Henry Draper Memorial Photographs) taken on 21 April 1899 at the Harvard College Observatory. On the discovery plate, its photographic magnitude was later determined to be 6.75. It was not seen on the plate taken on 1 November 1898, and there were no reported observations of the region around the star during the 171 day interval before Fleming's discovery, so it is possible that the actual maximum of the event was missed. By 27 October 1899 it had faded to 10th magnitude, and on 9 July 1900 Oliver Wendell reported its brightness to be between magnitude 11.5 and 12.0.

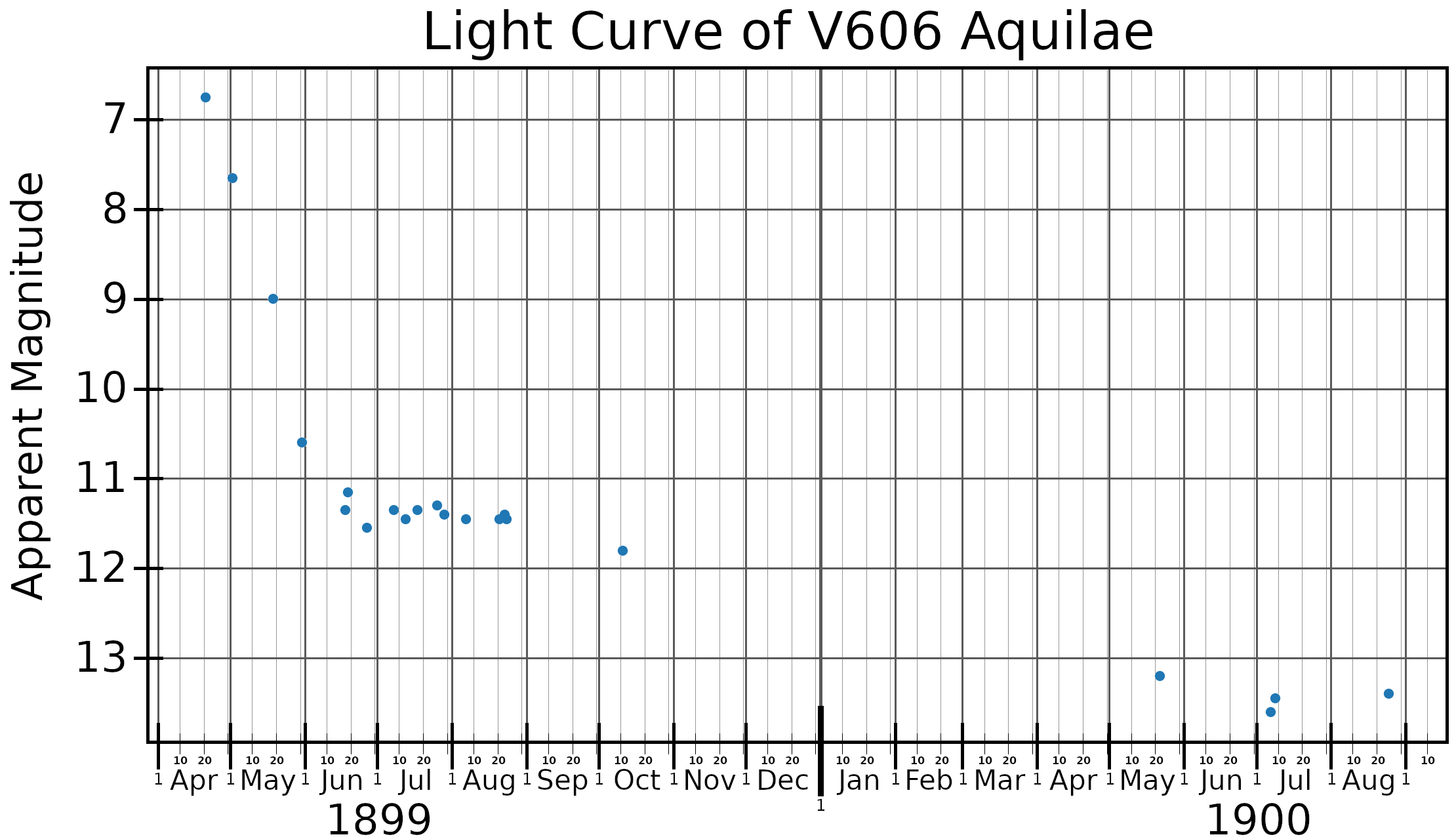
The light curve of nova V606 Aquilae plotted from photographic magnitude data tabulated by Shapley. Data points listed with identical times were averaged before plotting.

V606 Aquilae is classified as a "fast nova", because its faded by at least 3 magnitudes in about 65 days. The light curve showed a steep decline, followed by a period of about 100 days when the light curve plateaued, which caused its light curve to be classified as type P.

The nova was "recovered" (meaning the quiescent nova was identified by modern observers) as a magnitude 20.4 object, in 2012 from photometric observations at the Very Large Telescope. It is now a recurrent dwarf nova that flares every 270 days and with an amplitude of about 1.5 magnitude.
