= HD 180555 =

Binary star in the constellation Aquila

Observation data Epoch J2000 Equinox ICRS
- Constellation: Aquila
- Right ascension: 19^{h} 16^{m} 26.78744^{s}
- Declination: +14° 32′ 40.6234″
- Apparent magnitude (V): 5.67 (5.68 + 9.58)‍

Characteristics
- Spectral type: B9.5V + G0IV
- U−B color index: −0.12
- B−V color index: −0.03

Astrometry
Radial velocity (R_{v})	−19.3 km/s
Proper motion (μ)	RA: +8.09 mas/yr Dec.: +1.03 mas/yr
Parallax (π)	7.96±0.60 mas
Distance	410 ± 30 ly (126 ± 9 pc)
Absolute magnitude (M_{V})	+0.17

Orbit
Period (P)	13.673±0.069 yr
Semi-major axis (a)	0.0583±0.0014″
Eccentricity (e)	0.022±0.010
Inclination (i)	131.3±3.7°
Longitude of the node (Ω)	242.3±4.5°
Periastron epoch (T)	B 2008.572±1.101
Argument of periastron (ω) (secondary)	262.7±28.7°

Details

HD 180555 A
Mass	2.8 M_{☉}
Radius	4.1 R_{☉}
Luminosity	89 L_{☉}
Temperature	10,107 K
Metallicity [Fe/H]	−0.27 dex
Rotational velocity (v sin i)	158 km/s
Age	339 Myr

HD 180555 B
Mass	1.1 M_{☉}
Radius	1.7 R_{☉}
Luminosity	3.2 L_{☉}
Temperature	5,935 K
Metallicity [Fe/H]	−0.24 dex
Rotational velocity (v sin i)	158 km/s
Age	6.3 Gyr

Other designations
- BD+14°3852, HD 180555, HIP 94720, HR 7307, SAO 104668

Database references
SIMBAD	data

HD 180555 is a binary star in the equatorial constellation of Aquila. It consists of a two stars, orbiting with an orbital period of 8.95 years and an eccentricity of 0.43. A third component lies at an angular separation of 8.32″, but it is unrelated to the system.
