= V1291 Aquilae =

Variable star in the constellation Aquila

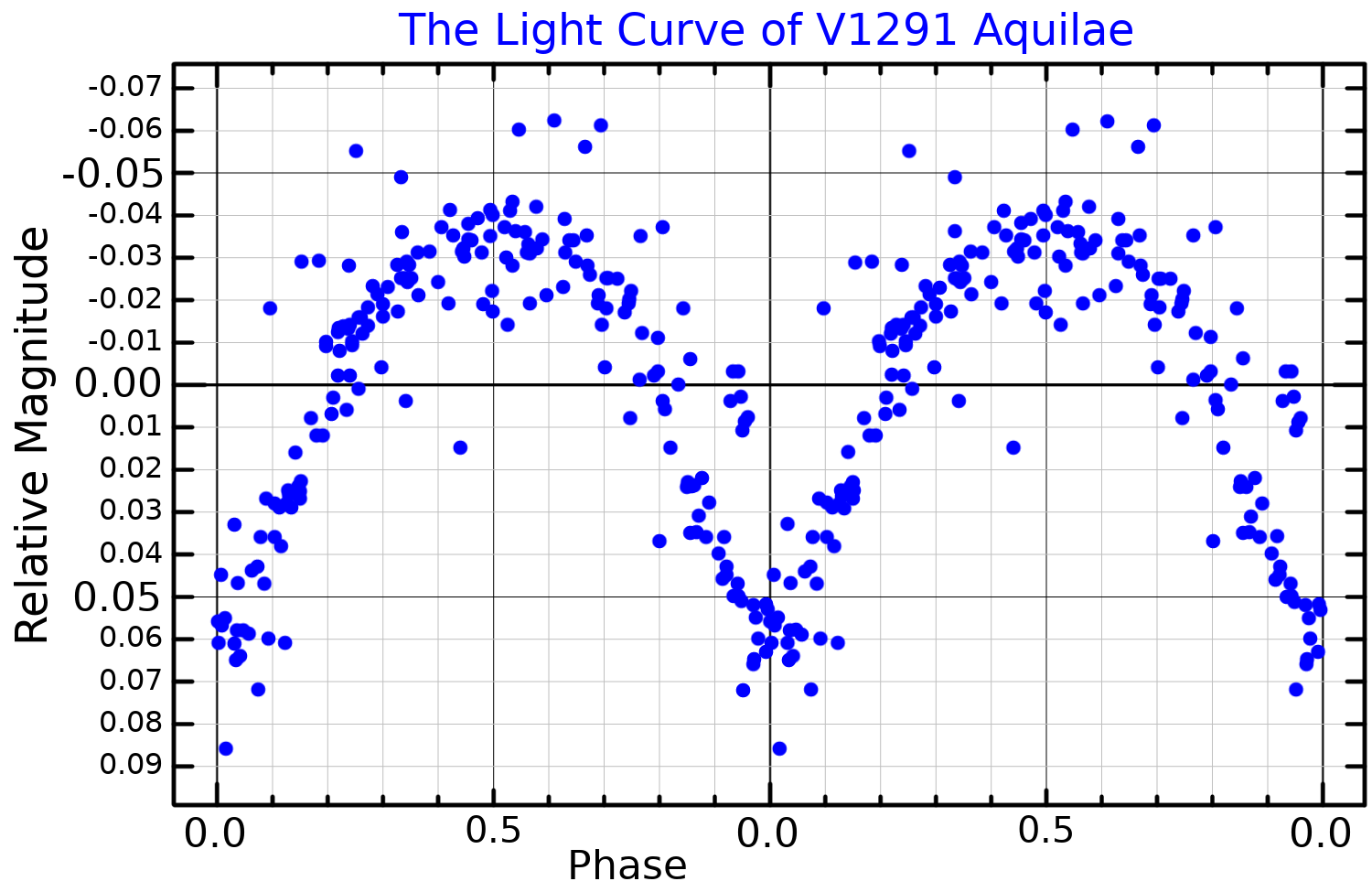
- A light curve for V1291 Aquilae, adapted from Mikulásek et al. (2003)

Observation data Epoch J2000 Equinox ICRS
- Constellation: Aquila
- Right ascension: 19^{h} 53^{m} 18.73574^{s}
- Declination: −03° 06′ 52.0653″
- Apparent magnitude (V): 5.65 (5.61 to 5.67)

Characteristics
- Evolutionary stage: Main sequence
- Spectral type: F0VpSrCrEu
- U−B color index: +0.10
- B−V color index: +0.20
- Variable type: α^{2} CVn

Astrometry
Radial velocity (R_{v})	−21.850±0.0005 km/s
Proper motion (μ)	RA: +21.578 mas/yr Dec.: +14.186 mas/yr
Parallax (π)	11.7248±0.1011 mas
Distance	278 ± 2 ly (85.3 ± 0.7 pc)

Details
Mass	2.26±0.05 M_{☉}
Radius	2.32±0.19 R_{☉}
Luminosity	25.7+2.3 −1.8 L_{☉}
Surface gravity (log g)	4.03±0.08 cgs
Temperature	8,770±30 K
Metallicity [Fe/H]	1.00 dex
Rotational velocity (v sin i)	6.7±0.5 km/s
Age	670±210 Myr

Other designations
- V1291 Aql, BD−03°4742, HD 188041, HIP 97871, HR 7575, SAO 143883

Database references
SIMBAD	data

V1291 Aquilae is a single star in the equatorial constellation of Aquila. It has a yellow-white hue and is dimly visible to the naked eye with an apparent visual magnitude that fluctuates around 5.65. Based on parallax measurements, it is located at a distance of approximately 278 light years from the Sun. The star it is drifting closer with a radial velocity of −22 km/s.

In 1962, Helmut A. Abt and John C. Gloson published data showing that the star's brightness varied. Based on that publication, the star was given its variable star designation, V1291 Aquilae, in 1972.

This is a magnetic chemically peculiar star, or Ap star, with a stellar classification of F0VpSrCrEu, matching an F-type main-sequence star with abundance anomalies of strontium, chromium, and europium in the spectrum. It is a variable star of type Alpha^{2} Canum Venaticorum that ranges in visual magnitude from 5.61 down to 5.67 with a period of 223.826 days. This is most likely the mean rotational period of the star. V1291 Aquilae was one of the first Ap stars discovered with a period of more than 100 days. It shows a surface magnetic field strength of 3.6 kG.
