= HD 180262 =

Wide double star in the constellation Aquila

Observation data Epoch J2000 Equinox ICRS
- Constellation: Aquila
- Right ascension: 19^{h} 15^{m} 20.08999^{s}
- Declination: +15° 05′ 01.1456″
- Apparent magnitude (V): 5.75

Characteristics
- Spectral type: G8II-III
- U−B color index: +0.85
- B−V color index: +1.067±0.015
- R−I color index: 0.54

Astrometry
| Radial velocity (R_{v}) | −25.2 km/s |
| Proper motion (μ) | RA: +1.178 mas/yr Dec.: −10.948 mas/yr |
| Parallax (π) | 5.392±0.0624 mas |
| Distance | 605 ± 7 ly (185 ± 2 pc) |
| Absolute magnitude (M_{V}) | −1.04 |

Details
| Mass | 4.10^{+0.04}_{−0.20} M_{☉} |
| Radius | 23.59^{+0.56}_{−0.51} R_{☉} |
| Luminosity | 257.7^{+6.6}_{−4.5} L_{☉} |
| Surface gravity (log g) | 2.245±0.001 cgs |
| Temperature | 4,910^{+2}_{−3} K |
| Metallicity [Fe/H] | 0.21 dex |
| Rotational velocity (v sin i) | 1.4 km/s |

Other designations
- BD+14°3846, HD 180262, HIP 94624, HR 7300, SAO 104655, WDS J19153+1505A

Database references
| SIMBAD | data |

HD 180262 is one member of a wide double star in the equatorial constellation of Aquila. The pair have a combined apparent visual magnitude of 5.57, which is bright enough to be dimly visible to the naked eye. Based on a parallax shift of 5.392 mas, it is located at a distance of 605 light-years (185 pc). It is drifting closer with a line of sight velocity component of −25 km/s.

The pair have an angular separation of 89.823 arc second as of 2008. The dual nature was discovered by Otto Struve and reported in 1875. HD 180262 has a visual magnitude of 5.75 and a stellar classification of G8II-III. It is presenting as an evolved giant star that has exhausted the supply of hydrogen at its core. With four times the mass of the Sun, the star has expanded to 24 times the Sun's radius. It is radiating 257 times the luminosity of the Sun from its photosphere at an effective temperature of 4,910 K.

The secondary is HD 180243, an ordinary A-type main-sequence star with a class of A1V. It is two magnitudes fainter than HD 180262, with a visual magnitude of 7.69.
