= HD 188385 =

Star in the constellation Aquila

Observation data Epoch J2000 Equinox ICRS
- Constellation: Aquila
- Right ascension: 19^{h} 54^{m} 40.20001^{s}
- Declination: +07° 08′ 25.2711″
- Apparent magnitude (V): 6.15

Characteristics
- Evolutionary stage: main sequence
- Spectral type: A2V
- U−B color index: +0.04
- B−V color index: +0.03

Astrometry
Radial velocity (R_{v})	−16.0 km/s
Proper motion (μ)	RA: +28.410 mas/yr Dec.: −0.093 mas/yr
Parallax (π)	12.6651±0.0321 mas
Distance	257.5 ± 0.7 ly (79.0 ± 0.2 pc)
Absolute magnitude (M_{V})	+1.58

Details
Mass	2.1 M_{☉}
Radius	1.7 R_{☉}
Luminosity	23 L_{☉}
Temperature	9,037 K
Metallicity [Fe/H]	−0.50 dex
Rotation	27.2 days
Rotational velocity (v sin i)	118 km/s
Age	371 Myr

Other designations
- BD+06°4351, HD 188385, HIP 97970, HR 7598, SAO 125221

Database references
SIMBAD	data

HD 188385 is an A-type main sequence star in the equatorial constellation of Aquila.
