= HD 191104 =

Star in the constellation Aquila

Observation data Epoch J2000 Equinox J2000
- Constellation: Aquila
- Right ascension: 20^{h} 07^{m} 50.36773^{s}
- Declination: +09° 23′ 59.4022″
- Apparent magnitude (V): 6.443

Characteristics
- Evolutionary stage: main sequence
- Spectral type: F3V
- U−B color index: −0.033
- B−V color index: +0.472

Astrometry
Radial velocity (R_{v})	−27 km/s
Proper motion (μ)	RA: +46.75 mas/yr Dec.: +28.81 mas/yr
Parallax (π)	25.40±1.00 mas
Distance	128 ± 5 ly (39 ± 2 pc)
Absolute magnitude (M_{V})	+3.46

Orbit
Primary	A
Companion	B
Period (P)	604.7 yr
Semi-major axis (a)	3.4″

Orbit
Primary	Ba
Companion	Bb
Period (P)	23.8 days
Eccentricity (e)	0.123
Semi-amplitude (K_{1}) (primary)	16.2 km/s
Semi-amplitude (K_{2}) (secondary)	16.6 km/s

Details

A
Mass	1.2 M_{☉}
Radius	1.4 R_{☉}
Luminosity	2.9 L_{☉}
Temperature	6,615 K
Rotation	9.34 days
Age	722 Myr

Ba
Mass	0.74 M_{☉}

Bb
Mass	0.72 M_{☉}

Other designations
- BD+08°4344, HD 191104, HIP 99158, HR 7693, SAO 125478

Database references
SIMBAD	data
- A
- B

HD 191104 is a star system in the equatorial constellation of Aquila. Two of the components form a close spectroscopic binary system, while a third star, also thought to be a spectroscopic binary, orbits the pair at a greater distance.
