= V1472 Aquilae =

Binary star system in the constellation Aquila

- Location of V1472 Aquilae (circled in red)

Observation data Epoch J2000 Equinox ICRS
- Constellation: Aquila
- Right ascension: 20^{h} 05^{m} 26.54594^{s}
- Declination: +15° 30′ 01.5408″
- Apparent magnitude (V): 6.32 to 6.51

Characteristics
- Evolutionary stage: AGB
- Spectral type: M2.5III
- U−B color index: +1.76
- B−V color index: +1.64
- Variable type: Candidate eclipsing variable

Astrometry
Radial velocity (R_{v})	−111.7±0.3 km/s
Proper motion (μ)	RA: 33.899 mas/yr Dec.: 24.023 mas/yr
Parallax (π)	4.1626±0.1069 mas
Distance	780 ± 20 ly (240 ± 6 pc)
Absolute magnitude (M_{V})	−2.6±1.0

Orbit
Period (P)	198.716±0.038 d
Semi-major axis (a)	175+23 −17 R_{☉}
Eccentricity (e)	0.048±0.016
Periastron epoch (T)	2,443,721.1
Argument of periastron (ω) (secondary)	99.3±29.7°
Semi-amplitude (K_{1}) (primary)	12.97±0.27 km/s

Details

V1472 Aql A
Mass	1.24+0.64 −0.36 M_{☉}
Radius	65±2 R_{☉}
Luminosity	650+100 −80 L_{☉}
Temperature	3,620+120 −110 K
Metallicity [Fe/H]	+0.02+0.28 −0.30 dex
Rotational velocity (v sin i)	10 km/s

V1472 Aql B
Mass	0.58+0.18 −0.12 M_{☉}

Other designations
- V1472 Aql, BD+15°4040, HD 190658, HIP 98954, HR 7680, SAO 105663

Database references
SIMBAD	data

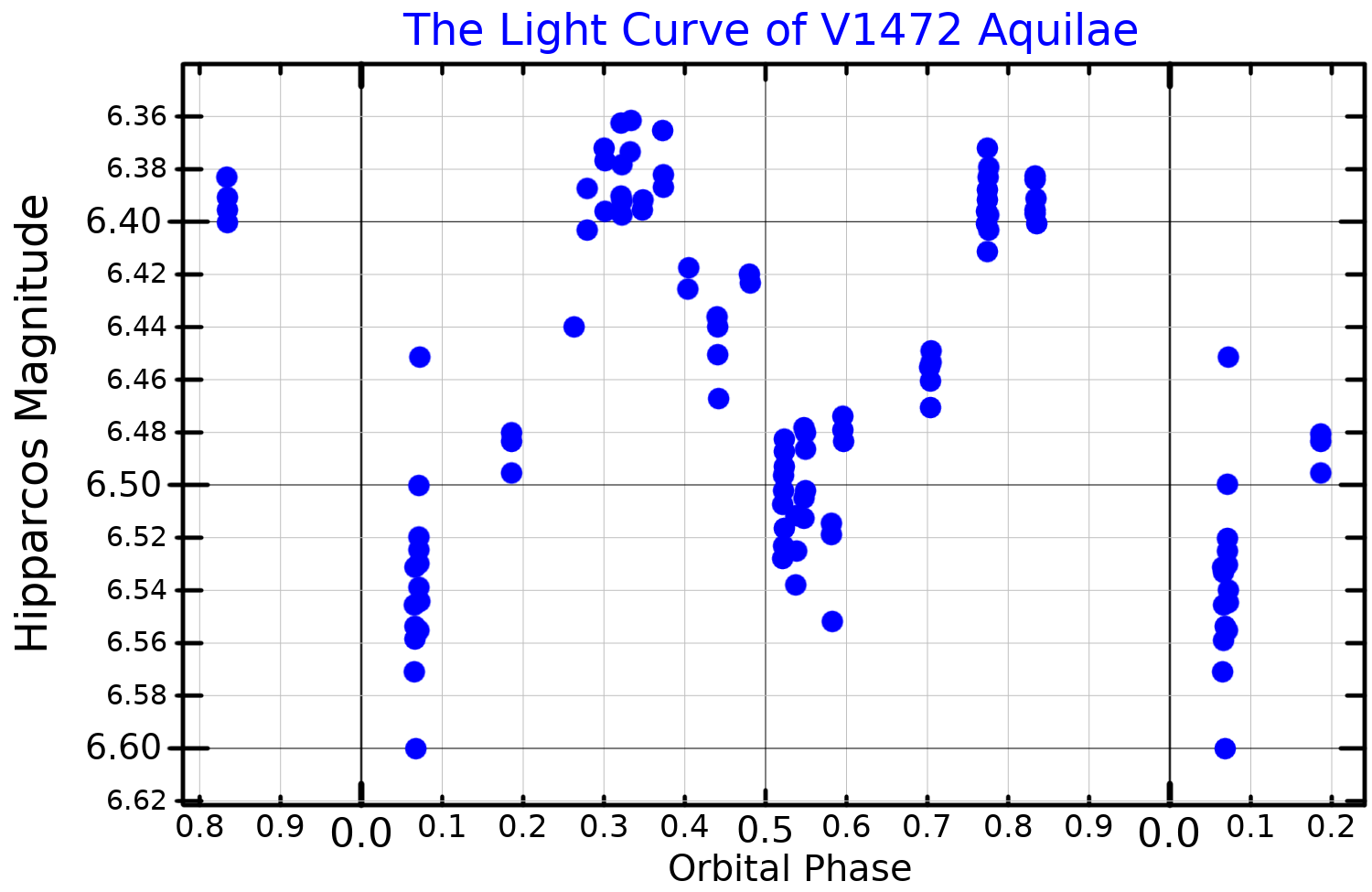
A light curve for V1472 Aquilae plotted from Hipparcos data, adapted from Samus (1997)

V1472 Aquilae is a triple star system in the equatorial constellation of Aquila. It is a variable star that ranges in brightness from 6.32 down to 6.51 The system is located at a distance of approximately 780 light years from the Sun based on parallax. It is a high-velocity star system with a radial velocity of −112 km/s. When it is at its brightest, it is very faintly visible to the naked eye under excellent observing conditions.

The binary nature of the main component was announced by P. B. Lucke and M. Mayor in 1982, who found it to be a single-lined spectroscopic binary with an orbital period of 198.7 days and an eccentricity of 0.05. At the time of its discovery, it was the shortest known binary period of any class M giant. The primary is an aging red giant with a stellar classification of M2.5III. It has a diameter 65 times and luminosity 650 times that of the Sun. The star is a fast rotator with a projected rotational velocity of 10 km/s, possibly due to interaction with its companion.

The variability of this star was discovered from Hipparcos data and, in 1997, it was classified as a semiregular variable with a period of 100.3727039 days. However, a plot of the light curve better matches that of an eclipsing binary or ellipsoidal variable. The 198-day orbital period produces a light curve with a primary and secondary minimum which, together with possible variations due to ellipsoidal rotation, produces the observed semiregular 100-day photometric variation. Later observations show that it is less luminous than expected for a pulsating star with its amplitude, being more typical of ellipsoidal variables, and that it has a 200.05-day period with primary and secondary minima.

A co-moving companion some 4.0 magnitudes fainter than the primary lies at an angular separation of 2.7 arcseconds.
