= CoRoT-8 =

Star in Aquila

Observation data Epoch J2000.0 Equinox ICRS
- Constellation: Aquila
- Right ascension: 19^{h} 26^{m} 21.2426^{s}
- Declination: +01° 25′ 35.178″

Characteristics
- Evolutionary stage: main sequence star
- Spectral type: K1V
- Variable type: planetary transit

Astrometry
Proper motion (μ)	RA: 13.683(28) mas/yr Dec.: −32.743(22) mas/yr
Parallax (π)	3.0903±0.0207 mas
Distance	1,055 ± 7 ly (324 ± 2 pc)

Details
Mass	0.89±0.04 M_{☉}
Radius	0.802±0.014 R_{☉}
Luminosity	0.41 L_{☉}
Surface gravity (log g)	4.58±0.01 cgs
Temperature	5143±178 K
Metallicity [Fe/H]	0.22±0.11 dex
Rotational velocity (v sin i)	2±1 km/s
Age	1.7+2.3 −1.4 Gyr

Database references
SIMBAD	data
Exoplanet Archive	data

CoRoT-8 is a star in the constellation Aquila at a distance of about 1055 light-years away. At least one planet revolves around the star.

CoRoT-8 is an orange dwarf which has 0.88 solar masses and 0.77 solar radius. By astronomical standards, this is already a rather young star compared to the Sun: its age is about 3 billion years. It got its name in honor of the CoRoT space telescope, with the help of which its planetary companion was discovered.

In 2010, a group of astronomers working within the CoRoT program announced the discovery of the planet CoRoT-8b in this system. It is a hot gas giant, similar in mass and size to Saturn. The planet orbits at a distance of about 0.06 AU from the parent star, while making a complete revolution in 6.21 days.

The CoRoT-8 planetary system
Companion (in order from star)	Mass	Semimajor axis (AU)	Orbital period (days)	Eccentricity	Inclination (°)	Radius
b	0.218 ± 0.034 M_{J}	0.0636 ± 0.0014	6.212445 ± 0.000007	<0.19	88.18±0.08	0.619+0.016 −0.017 R_{J}
