= V450 Aquilae =

Star in the constellation Aquila

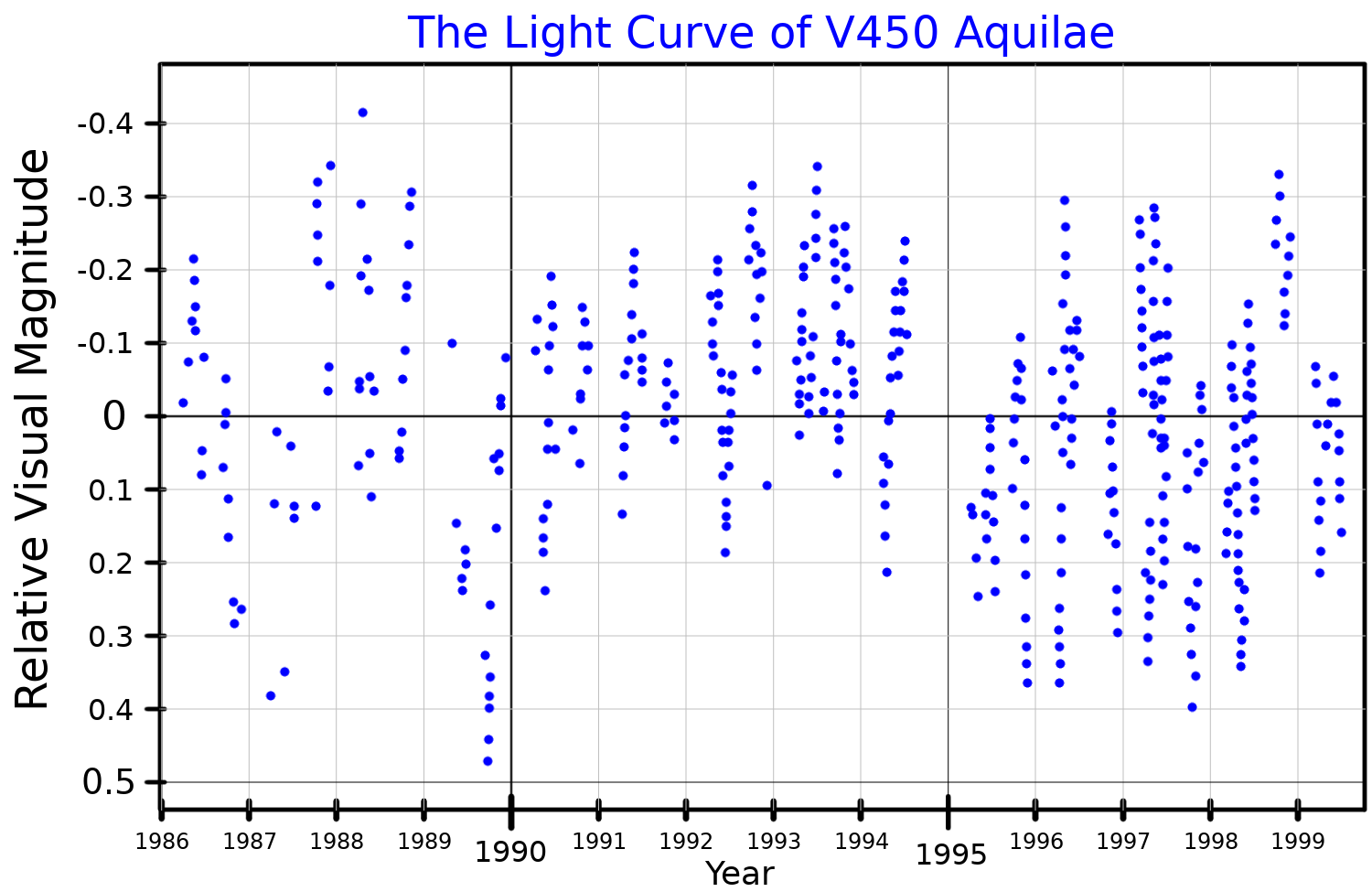
- The visual band light curve of V450 Aquilae, adapted from Percy et al. (2001)

Observation data Epoch J2000 Equinox ICRS
- Constellation: Aquila
- Right ascension: 19^{h} 33^{m} 46.031^{s}
- Declination: +05° 27′ 56.54″
- Apparent magnitude (V): 6.14 to 6.86

Characteristics
- Evolutionary stage: AGB
- Spectral type: M5-5.5III
- B−V color index: 1.471
- Variable type: SRb

Astrometry
Radial velocity (R_{v})	3 km/s
Proper motion (μ)	RA: −5.26 ± 0.53 mas/yr Dec.: −24.24 ± 0.32 mas/yr
Parallax (π)	4.94±0.47 mas
Distance	660 ± 60 ly (200 ± 20 pc)
Absolute magnitude (M_{V})	−1.87

Details
Luminosity	2172 L_{☉}
Temperature	3326 K

Other designations
- BD+05°4190, HD 184313, HIP 96204, SAO 124789 `

Database references
SIMBAD	data

V450 Aquilae is semi-regular pulsating star in the constellation Aquila. Located around 660 light-years distant, it shines with a luminosity approximately 2,172 times that of the Sun and has a surface temperature of 3,326 K. The star varies in brightness from magnitude from 6.14 to 6.86, so when it is at its brightest, it will be faintly visible to the naked eye.

Cuno Hoffmeister announced that V450 Aquilae was a newly discovered variable star in 1935. Its period is 64.2 days.
