= V1401 Aquilae =

Star in the constellation Aquila

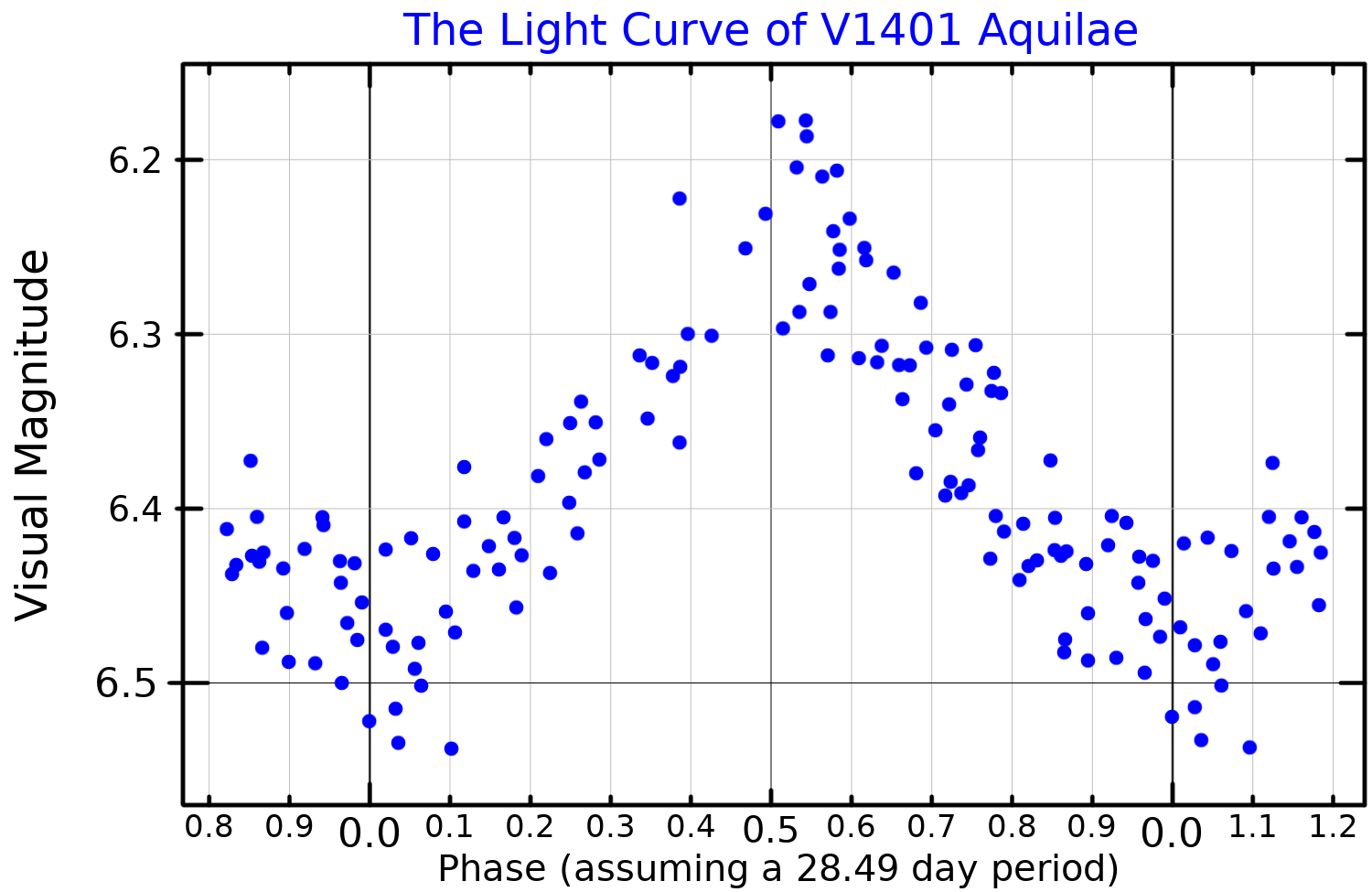
- The visual band light curve of V1401 Aquilae, adapted from Waelkens & Burnet(1985)

Observation data Epoch J2000.0 Equinox ICRS
- Constellation: Aquila
- Right ascension: 20^{h} 05^{m} 05.41344^{s}
- Declination: −11° 35′ 57.8964″
- Apparent magnitude (V): 6.18 to 6.55

Characteristics
- Spectral type: F2II
- B−V color index: 0.543±0.023
- Variable type: SRd

Astrometry
Radial velocity (R_{v})	−12.1±2.9 km/s
Proper motion (μ)	RA: −2.585 mas/yr Dec.: +15.629 mas/yr
Parallax (π)	1.3722±0.0441 mas
Distance	2,380 ± 80 ly (730 ± 20 pc)

Details
Mass	4.1 M_{☉}
Radius	35 R_{☉}
Luminosity	656; 1,309 L_{☉}
Surface gravity (log g)	1.49±0.14 cgs
Temperature	6,192±90 K
Metallicity [Fe/H]	−1.12±0.08 dex

Other designations
- V1401 Aql, BD−12°5641, HD 190390, HIP 98910, HR 7671, SAO 163245, WDS J20051-1136A

Database references
SIMBAD	data

V1401 Aquilae is a single, semi-regular pulsating star in the equatorial constellation of Aquila. It has the designation HD 190390 from the Henry Draper Catalogue, and was formerly designated 64 Sagittarii. The evolutionary status of the star is unclear, and it has been classified as a post-AGB object, a UU Herculis variable, or belonging to the W Virginis variable subclass of the type II Cepheids. It is dimly visible to the naked eye with an apparent visual magnitude that fluctuates around 6.3. Based on parallax measurements, it is located at a distance of approximately 2,380 light years. It lies 21.5° from the galactic plane.

The variability of this star was announced by W. Strohmeier and associates in 1965. C. Waelkens and M. Burnet in 1985 found an irregular photometric variation with a period of around a month and suggested it is a candidate UU Herculis variable. J. D. Fernie in 1986 confirmed the variability and tentatively identified periods of 28.4 and 11.8 days. He found a very low gravity with shell-like features, suggesting potential mass loss. An analysis of the chemical composition by R. E. Luck and associates in 1990 found a mild enhancement of s-process elements as well as lithium, indicating it may have evolved from a lithium-rich giant.

The stellar classification of V1401 Aql is F2II, matching an F-type bright giant. There is strong evidence that this star belongs to the population II cepheids, and it may be a W Virginis variable. On the Hertzsprung–Russell diagram it lies on the blue (hot) side of the Cepheid instability strip for population II stars. Membership in the UU Herculis variable class seems less likely since it has a relatively normal radial velocity and no infrared excess has been detected. The pulsation period of 28.6 days has been confirmed, but the pulsational behavior of this star is complex and it is not successfully modeled using a simple harmonic radial pulsation.

The star is strongly metal deficient by a factor of 40, meaning the abundances of higher mass elements is much lower than in the Sun. There is a mild enhancement of s-process elements, although this is not considered to be intrinsic. Some investigators have suspected the star to be in an evolutionary stage following the asymptotic giant branch, but this is not confirmed based on chemical abundances.
