= 24 Aquilae =

Star in the constellation Aquila

Observation data Epoch J2000 Equinox J2000
- Constellation: Aquila
- Right ascension: 19^{h} 18^{m} 50.94777^{s}
- Declination: +00° 20′ 20.5448″
- Apparent magnitude (V): 6.423

Characteristics
- Spectral type: K0-IIIa:CH1Ba0.5
- U−B color index: +0.770
- B−V color index: +1.050

Astrometry
Radial velocity (R_{v})	−26.13±0.15 km/s
Proper motion (μ)	RA: +10.755 mas/yr Dec.: +11.298 mas/yr
Parallax (π)	7.5115±0.0437 mas
Distance	434 ± 3 ly (133.1 ± 0.8 pc)
Absolute magnitude (M_{V})	+0.64

Details
Mass	2.2 M_{☉}
Radius	11.17+0.32 −0.70 R_{☉}
Luminosity	56.397±0.468 L_{☉}
Surface gravity (log g)	2.48 cgs
Temperature	4,733+155 −67 K
Metallicity [Fe/H]	−0.19±0.06 dex
Age	0.5 Gyr

Other designations
- BD+00 4170, HD 181053, HIP 94913, HR 7321, SAO 124492

Database references
SIMBAD	data

24 Aquilae (abbreviated 24 Aql) is a star in the equatorial constellation of Aquila. 24 Aquilae is its Flamsteed designation. It is located at a distance of around 434 light-years (133 parsecs) from Earth and has an apparent visual magnitude of 6.4. According to the Bortle Dark-Sky Scale, this star is just visible to the naked eye in dark rural skies. It is drifting closer to the Sun with a radial velocity of −26 km/s.

This is a mild barium star, as identified by the presence of a weak absorption line of singly-ionized barium atoms at a wavelength of 455.4 nm. Such stars display an atmospheric overabundance of carbon and the heavy elements produced by the s-process, which was most likely transferred into the atmosphere by a wide binary stellar companion. However, in the case of 24 Aquilae, the abundances of heavy elements are near normal.

At an estimated age of a half billion years, 24 Aquilae is a evolved giant star with a stellar classification of K0 IIIa. It has more than double the mass of the Sun, 11 times the Sun's radius, and shines with 56 times the Sun's luminosity. It is radiating this energy into space from its outer atmosphere at an effective temperature of 4,733 K. This heat is what gives it the cool orange hue characteristic of a K-type star.
