= HD 179079 b =

Extrasolar planet in the constellation Aquila

Discovery
- Discovered by: Valenti et al.
- Discovery site: Keck Observatory
- Discovery date: August 12, 2009
- Detection method: Radial velocity

Orbital characteristics
- Semi-major axis: 0.1214±0.0068 AU
- Eccentricity: 0.049±0.087
- Orbital period (sidereal): 14.479±0.01 d
- Time of periastron: 2463211.3±3.0
- Argument of periastron: 308±77
- Semi-amplitude: 6.22±0.78
- Star: HD 179079

HD 179079 b is an extrasolar planet which orbits the G-type subgiant star HD 179079, located approximately 228 light years away in the constellation Aquila. This planet has mass only 1/12 that of Jupiter or 1.5 times Neptune. The planet orbits very close to the star, at a distance of 0.11 AU. This planet takes two weeks to revolve around the star. This planet was discovered using the Keck telescopes on August 12, 2009.
