= HD 183144 =

Star in the constellation Aquila

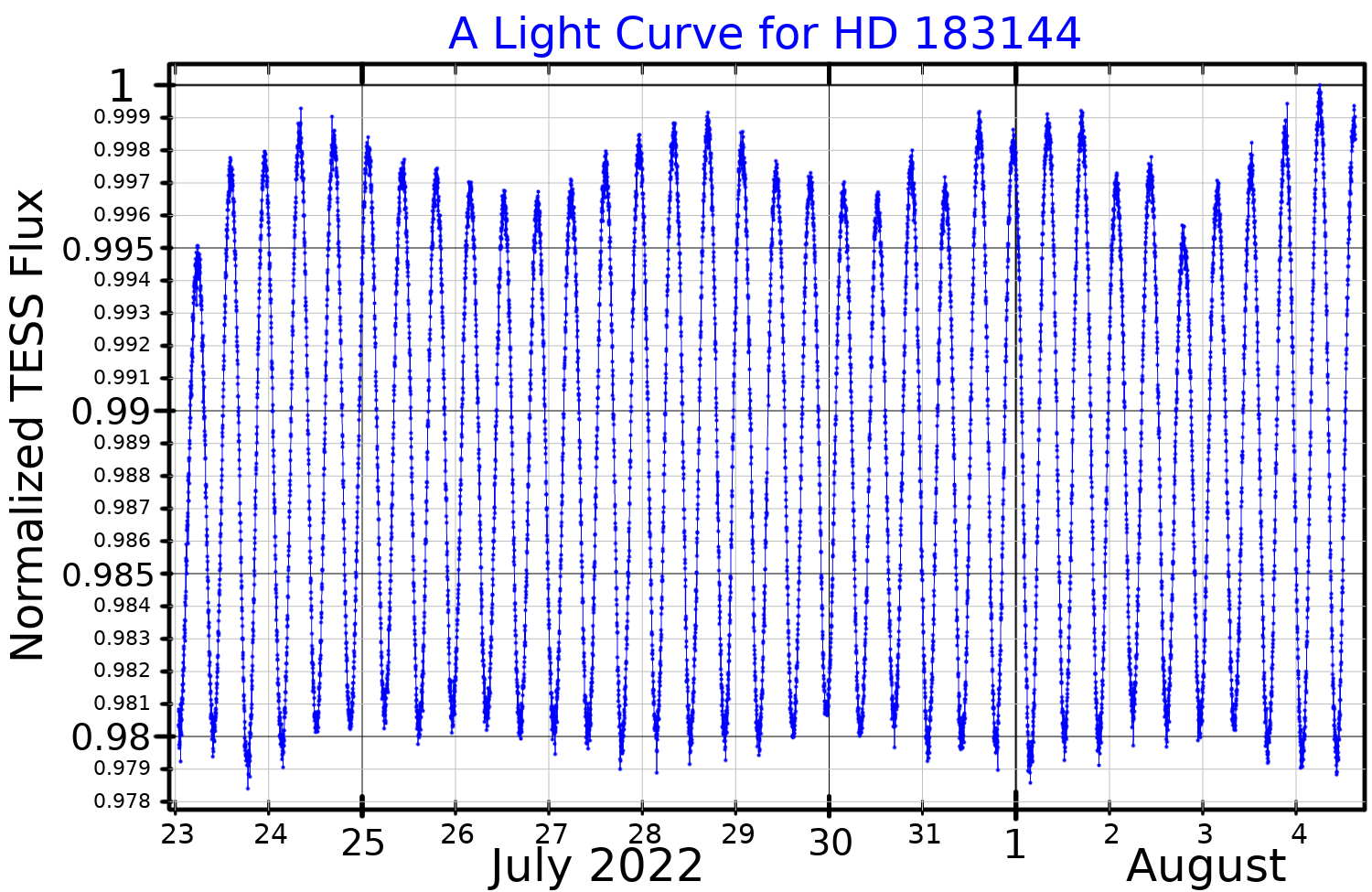
- A light curve for HD 183144, plotted from TESS data

Observation data Epoch J2000 Equinox ICRS
- Constellation: Aquila
- Right ascension: 19^{h} 27^{m} 33.90756^{s}
- Declination: +14° 16′ 56.9284″
- Apparent magnitude (V): 6.32

Characteristics
- Spectral type: B4III
- U−B color index: −0.512
- B−V color index: −0.068±0.005
- Variable type: suspected

Astrometry
Radial velocity (R_{v})	+4.0±4.3 km/s
Proper motion (μ)	RA: 6.162 mas/yr Dec.: −4.550 mas/yr
Parallax (π)	2.8745±0.0280 mas
Distance	1,130 ± 10 ly (348 ± 3 pc)
Absolute magnitude (M_{V})	−0.66

Details
Mass	5.1 M_{☉}
Radius	5.8 R_{☉}
Luminosity	2,676 L_{☉}
Surface gravity (log g)	3.73 cgs
Temperature	15,139 K
Metallicity [Fe/H]	−0.003 dex
Rotational velocity (v sin i)	200 km/s
Age	160 Myr

Other designations
- BD+13°4020, HD 183144, HIP 95664, HR 7396, SAO 104862

Database references
SIMBAD	data

HD 183144 is a suspected variable star in the equatorial constellation of Aquila. It is a hot giant star about 1,130 light years away.

Results from the MASCARA experiment indicate that HD 183144 is a pulsating variable star with a period of 0.3649 days, during which it varies by 0.01 magnitude in white light. It has a mass five times that of the Sun and, at an age of 160 million years, has already evolved away from the main sequence. It has expended to nearly six times the radius of the Sun and, with an effective temperature of 15,139 K, it has a bolometric luminosity of 2,676 L_{☉}.
