= 68 Aquilae =

Star in the constellation Aquila

Observation data Epoch J2000 Equinox ICRS
- Constellation: Aquila
- Right ascension: 20^{h} 28^{m} 24.904^{s}
- Declination: −03° 21′ 28.05″
- Apparent magnitude (V): 6.12

Characteristics
- Evolutionary stage: main sequence
- Spectral type: B9 V:
- U−B color index: −0.20
- B−V color index: −0.06

Astrometry
Radial velocity (R_{v})	−9 km/s
Proper motion (μ)	RA: +27.242 mas/yr Dec.: −19.118 mas/yr
Parallax (π)	5.9286±0.052 mas
Distance	550 ± 5 ly (169 ± 1 pc)

Details
Mass	3.16±0.12 M_{☉}
Radius	3.361±0.168 R_{☉}
Luminosity	159.8+29.9 −25.2 L_{☉}
Temperature	10,641+50 −49 K
Rotational velocity (v sin i)	138 km/s

Other designations
- 68 Aql, BD−03°4906, HD 194939, HIP 100977, HR 7821, SAO 144468, WDS J20284-0321A

Database references
SIMBAD	data

68 Aquilae (abbreviated 68 Aql) is a double star in the equatorial constellation of Aquila. 68 Aquilae is its Flamsteed designation. It has an apparent visual magnitude of 6.12, which is dimly visible to the naked eye under favorable viewing conditions. The distance to the brighter component is approximately 550 light years based on parallax measurements, and it is drifting further away with a heliocentric radial velocity of –9 km/s.

The stellar classification of the brighter component is B9 V:, matching a B-type main-sequence star. However, the ':' suffix indicates some uncertainty in the classification. It has an estimated 3.2 times the mass of the Sun and 3.4 times the Sun's radius. 68 Aquilae is radiating 160 times the Sun's luminosity from its photosphere at an effective temperature of 10,641 K. The star is spinning rapidly with a projected rotational velocity of 138 km/s.

There is a companion star at a projected separation of 9.00″ as of 2013. It was first reported in 1939 by R. A. Rossiter when the separation was measured at 9.8″. This star has a visual magnitude of 13.70.
