= 23 Aquilae =

Binary star system in the constellation Aquila

- Location of 23 Aql (circled)

Observation data Epoch J2000 Equinox ICRS
- Constellation: Aquila
- Right ascension: 19^{h} 18^{m} 32.49672^{s}
- Declination: +01° 05′ 06.4941″
- Apparent magnitude (V): 5.10

Characteristics
- Spectral type: K1 II/III
- U−B color index: +1.01
- B−V color index: +1.15

Astrometry
Radial velocity (R_{v})	−23.13±0.19 km/s
Proper motion (μ)	RA: +11.242 mas/yr Dec.: +15.753 mas/yr
Parallax (π)	8.0976±0.3042 mas
Distance	400 ± 20 ly (123 ± 5 pc)
Absolute magnitude (M_{V})	+0.7

Details
Mass	1.1 M_{☉}
Radius	21 R_{☉}
Luminosity	197 L_{☉}
Surface gravity (log g)	1.85 cgs
Temperature	4,202 K
Metallicity [Fe/H]	0.13 dex
Rotational velocity (v sin i)	10 km/s

Other designations
- 23 Aql, BD+00°4168, HD 180972, HIP 94885, HR 7319, SAO 124487

Database references
SIMBAD	data

23 Aquilae is a binary star system in the equatorial constellation of Aquila. 23 Aquilae is its Flamsteed designation. It is at a distance of about 400 light-years (120 parsecs) with an apparent visual magnitude of 5.10, which is bright enough to be faintly visible to the naked eye as an orange-hued star. The brightness of the star is diminished by 0.21 in magnitude because of extinction from interstellar dust and gas. The system is moving closer to the Earth with a heliocentric radial velocity of –23 km/s.

The primary component of this system is a magnitude 5.31 K-type giant star or bright giant with a stellar classification of K1. The star is radiating 197 times the luminosity of the Sun from its enlarged photosphere at an effective temperature of 4,202 K. Orbiting at an angular separation of 3.25 arcseconds is a magnitude 8.76 companion star.
