= HD 179079 =

Star in the constellation Aquila

Observation data Epoch J2000.0 Equinox ICRS
- Constellation: Aquila
- Right ascension: 19^{h} 11^{m} 09.82858^{s}
- Declination: −02° 38′ 18.1881″
- Apparent magnitude (V): 7.95

Characteristics
- Evolutionary stage: subgiant
- Spectral type: G5IV
- Apparent magnitude (B): 8.694
- Apparent magnitude (J): 6.734±0.021
- Apparent magnitude (H): 6.402±0.031
- Apparent magnitude (K): 6.311±0.026
- B−V color index: 0.744±0.013

Astrometry
Radial velocity (R_{v})	19.73±0.20 km/s
Proper motion (μ)	RA: −134.355 mas/yr Dec.: −89.378 mas/yr
Parallax (π)	14.3191±0.0253 mas
Distance	227.8 ± 0.4 ly (69.8 ± 0.1 pc)
Absolute magnitude (M_{V})	3.87

Details
Mass	1.25±0.09 M_{☉}
Radius	1.792±0.016 R_{☉}
Luminosity	2.41±0.27 L_{☉}
Surface gravity (log g)	4.11±0.04 cgs
Temperature	5,672±14 K
Metallicity [Fe/H]	0.19±0.03 dex
Rotational velocity (v sin i)	1.00±0.52 km/s
Age	7.88±0.65 Gyr

Other designations
- BD−02 4881, HD 179079, HIP 94256, SAO 143111, PPM 202620

Database references
SIMBAD	data
Exoplanet Archive	data

HD 179079 is a star with an exoplanetary companion in the equatorial constellation of Aquila. It has an apparent visual magnitude of approximately 7.96, making it too faint to be readily visible to the naked eye. The distance to this star can be determine using parallax measurements, which yields an estimate of 228 light years. It is drifting further away with a radial velocity of +20 km/s.

This is an evolved G-type subgiant star with a stellar classification of G5IV. It is nearly 7–8 billion years old and is chromospherically inactive with a projected rotational velocity of 1 km/s. The evolutionary track for this star implies a mass slightly higher than the Sun. It is larger in radius than the Sun and has a higher metallicity; the abundance of elements in the star's atmosphere with higher atomic numbers than hydrogen and helium. HD 179079 is radiating about 2.3 times the luminosity of the Sun from its photosphere at an effective temperature of 5,672 K.

== Planetary system ==
An exoplanet, HD 179079 b, was announced in August 2009 to be orbiting this star. The planet was detected by the radial velocity method, using the HIRES spectrometer at Keck Observatory.

The HD 179079 planetary system
Companion (in order from star)	Mass	Semimajor axis (AU)	Orbital period (days)	Eccentricity	Inclination (°)	Radius
b	≥0.076±0.012 M_{J}	0.1214+0.0064 −0.0071	14.4808+0.01 −0.0035	0.049±0.087	—	—

== See also ==
- HD 73534
- List of extrasolar planets
