= HD 185018 =

Star in the constellation Aquila

Observation data Epoch J2000 Equinox J2000
- Constellation: Aquila
- Right ascension: 19^{h} 36^{m} 52.45500^{s}
- Declination: +11° 16′ 23.5086″
- Apparent magnitude (V): 5.978

Characteristics
- Spectral type: G0Ib
- B−V color index: +0.881±0.015

Astrometry
Radial velocity (R_{v})	+0.50±0.79 km/s
Proper motion (μ)	RA: 7.929 mas/yr Dec.: 2.719 mas/yr
Parallax (π)	3.2148±0.0705 mas
Distance	1,010 ± 20 ly (311 ± 7 pc)
Absolute magnitude (M_{V})	−1.81

Details
Mass	5.5 M_{☉}
Radius	25.17+0.37 −0.72 R_{☉}
Luminosity	395±11 L_{☉}
Surface gravity (log g)	2.06 cgs
Temperature	5,131+75 −38 K
Metallicity [Fe/H]	−0.16 dex
Rotational velocity (v sin i)	10 km/s

Other designations
- BD+10°3984, GC 27120, HD 185018, HIP 96481, HR 7456, SAO 105045, PPM 136605, WDS J19369+1116A

Database references
SIMBAD	data

HD 185018 is supergiant star in the equatorial constellation of Aquila.
