= V500 Aquilae =

1943 Nova event in the constellation Aquila

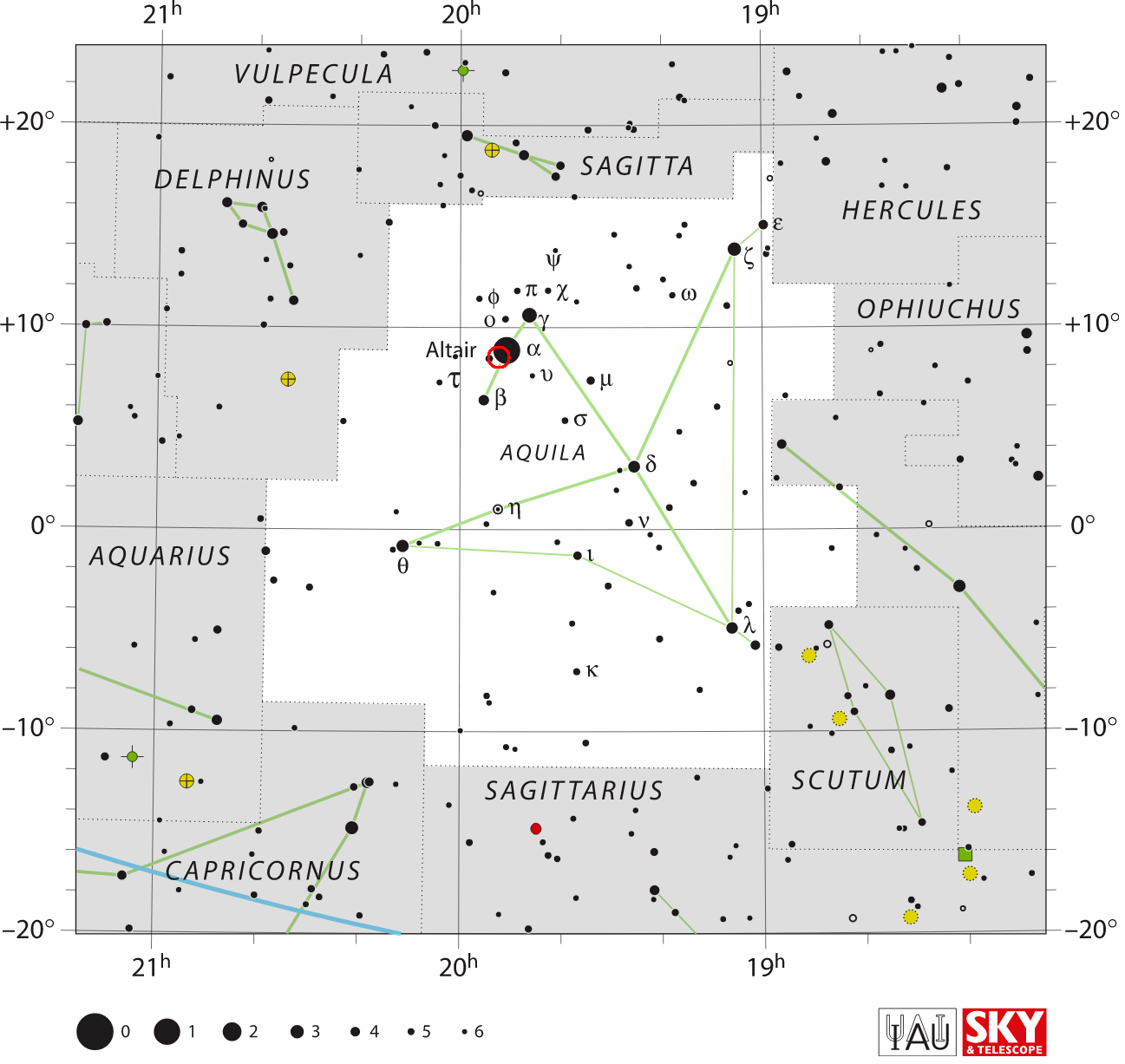
- Location of V500 Aquilae (circled in red)

Observation data Epoch J2000.0 Equinox ICRS
- Constellation: Aquila
- Right ascension: 19^{h} 52^{m} 27.84^{s}
- Declination: +08° 28′ 46.4″
- Apparent magnitude (V): 6.1 - 17.8p

Astrometry
Distance	4900 pc

Characteristics
- Variable type: classical nova, eclipsing binary

Other designations
- Nova Aquilae 1943, AAVSO 1947+08

Database references
SIMBAD	data

V500 Aquilae also known as Nova Aquilae 1943 was a nova which appeared in the constellation Aquila, very near the star Altair, in 1943. It was discovered by Cuno Hoffmeister on photographic plates taken at Sonneberg Observatory on 5 September 1943, when it had a photographic magnitude of 12. It reached its peak brightness sometime between 13 April 1943 when it was fainter than photographic magnitude 13.5, and 2 May 1943 when its photographic magnitude was 6.55 (6.1 visual magnitude).

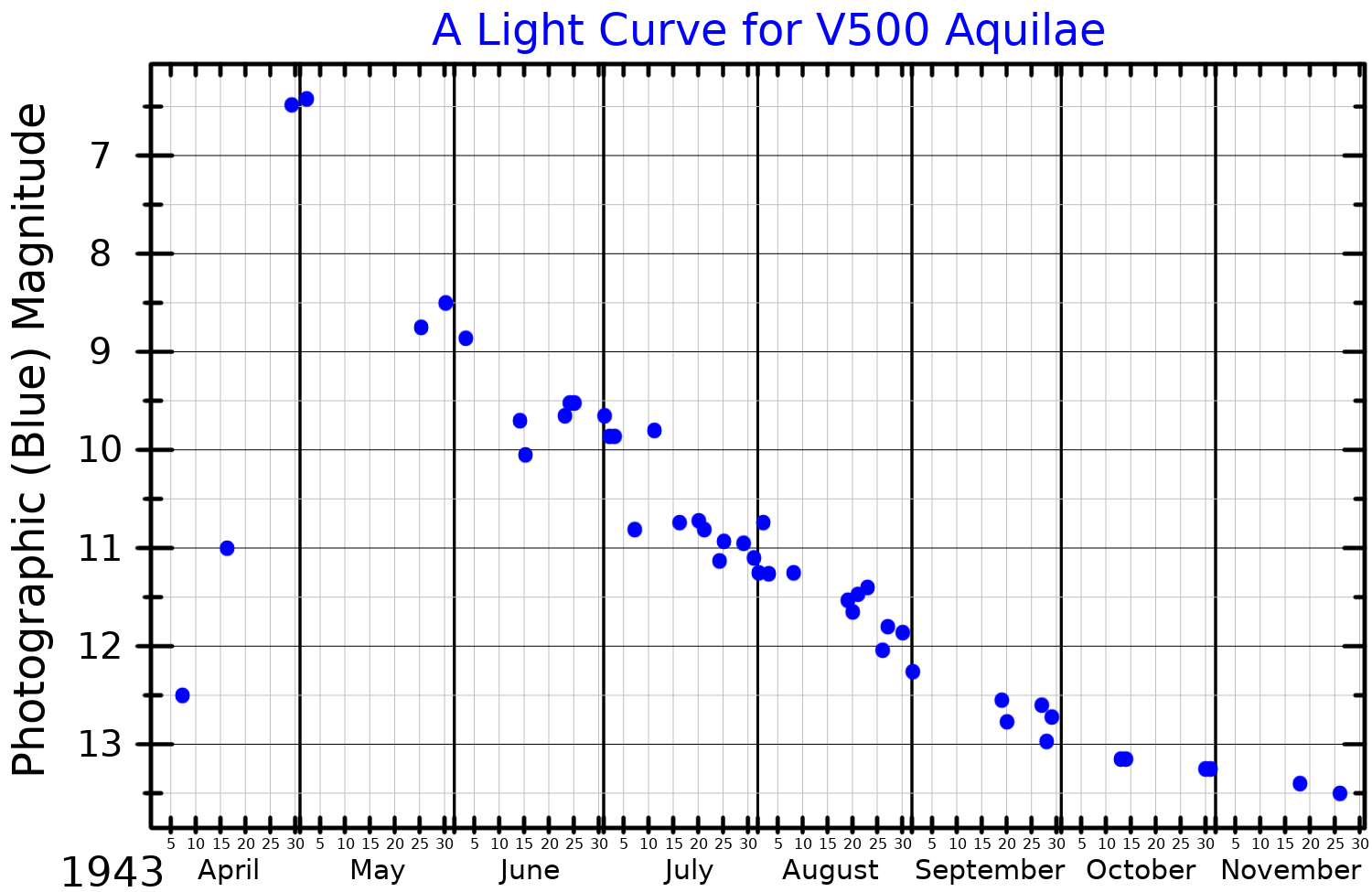
A light curve for V500 Aquilae, plotted from data published by Gaposchkin (1943)

V500 Aquilae's brightness dropped by 3 magnitudes from its peak in 42 days, making it a "fast" nova.

All novae are binary stars, with a "donor" star orbiting a white dwarf. The two stars are so close to each other that matter is transferred from the donor to the white dwarf. Because the stars are separated by a distance comparable to the radius of the donor star, novae are often eclipsing binaries, and V500 Aquilae does show eclipses. The eclipses, first seen in 1994 at the European Southern Observatory, have a depth of about 0.4 magnitudes, and the orbital period is 3.485±0.02 h.

In 1984 a small (radius 2.0 arc seconds) nova remnant surrounding V500 Aquilae and expanding at 1380 km/sec, was discovered using the Hale Telescope. The expansion of that remnant has been used to derive a distance estimate of 4900 parsecs.
