= Cora G. Burwell =

American researcher

- Cora G. Burwell, from a 1949 newspaper
- Born: June 25, 1883; Massachusetts, US
- Died: June 20, 1982 (aged 98); Los Angeles, California, US
- Education: Mount Holyoke College (BA)
- Known for: Interpretation of stellar spectral data
- Scientific career
- Fields: Astronomy
- Workplaces: Mount Wilson Observatory

Cora Gertrude Burwell (June 25, 1883 – June 20, 1982) was an American astronomical researcher specialized in stellar spectroscopy. She was based at Mount Wilson Observatory from 1907 to 1949. Burwell compiled several catalogs of Be stars before 1950, and co-authored papers with astronomers Dorrit Hoffleit, Henrietta Hill Swope, Walter Sydney Adams, Milton L. Humason, and Paul W. Merrill.

== Early life ==
Cora Gertrude Burwell was born in Massachusetts and raised in Stafford Springs, Connecticut. She graduated from Mount Holyoke College in 1906 and was active in Holyoke alumnae activities in the Los Angeles area.

== Career ==
In July 1907, Burwell was appointed to a "(human) computer" position at Mount Wilson Observatory. In 1910, she attended the fourth conference of the International Union for Cooperation in Solar Research, when it was held at Mount Wilson. At that event, she and the other women who worked at the observatory served afternoon tea to the women in attendance, including the wives of international visitors Clarence Chant, Alfred Fowler, Arthur Schuster, Herbert Hall Turner, and Nicolae Donici.

Burwell specialized in stellar spectroscopy at Mount Wilson. With Paul W. Merrill she compiled several catalogs of Be-type stars, in 1933, 1943, 1949, and 1950. Their work doubled the number of known Be-type stars. She also discovered several novae, and helped to tend the Mount Wilson Observatory Library. She retired from the observatory in 1949, but continued speaking about astronomy to community groups. She also published a book of poetry, Neatly Packed.

== Publications ==
Burwell's research was published in scientific journals including Publications of the Astronomical Society of the Pacific, The Astrophysical Journal, and Proceedings of the National Academy of Sciences. She was solo author on some scientific publications, and co-authored several others (some of which she was lead author), with notable collaborators including Dorrit Hoffleit, Henrietta Swope, Walter S. Adams, Milton L. Humason, and Paul W. Merrill. She was the only woman author credited in the 1933 Contributions from the Mount Wilson Observatory research publication, in which she co-authored three papers.

- Walter S Adams and Cora G Burwell (1915) Results of an Investigation of the Flash Spectrum without an Eclipse. Proceedings of the National Academy of Sciences (USA) 1 (3) 127–130.
- WS Adams, AH Joy, G Strömberg and CG Burwell (1921) The parallaxes of 1646 stars derived by the spectroscopic method Naturwissenschaften 9, 598 (in German)
- "Discovery and Observation of Stars in Class Be" (1925, with Paul W. Merrill and Milton L. Humason)
- "Behavior of Bright Lines in the Spectra of Several Long-Period Variable Stars" (1930, with Paul W. Merrill)
- "Additional Stars of Classes N and S" (1933, with Paul W. Merrill and Roscoe F. Sanford)
- "Discovery and Observation of Stars in Class Be: Second Paper" (1933, with Paul W. Merrill and Milton L. Humason)
- "Variations in Structure of the Hydrogen Lines in the Spectrum of H.D. 31293" (1933, with Paul W. Merrill)
- Paul W. Merrill and Cora G. Burwell (1933) Catalogue and Bibliography of Stars of Classes B and A Whose Spectra Have Bright Hydrogen Lines. The Astrophysical Journal 78 87.
- "A Nova in Sagittarius (June 1936)" (1937)
- "Intensities and Displacements of Interstellar Lines" (1937, with Paul W. Merrill, Roscoe F. Sanford, and O. C. Wilson)
- "Lines of Ionized Barium in Stellar Spectra" (1938)
- "Minor Solo" (1940, poem)
- "A Faint Nova in Ophiuchus (July 1940) (1941, with Henrietta Swope)
- "A Faint Nova in Ophiuchus (June 1939)" (1943, with Dorrit Hoffleit)
- "Supplement to the Mount Wilson Catalogue and Bibliography of Stars of Classes B and A Whose Spectra Have Bright Hydrogen Lines" (1943, with Paul W. Merrill)
- "Rapid Outward Motions in the Atmosphere of the Iron Star XX Ophiuchi" (1946, with Paul W. Merrill and William C. Miller)
- "The Spectrum of Nova Sagittari May 1947" (1947, with Paul W. Merrill and William C. Miller)
- "Hydrogen Emission in the Spectrum of HD 197419" (1947, with William C. Miller)
- "Search for Stars with Glowing Hydrogen" (1950)
- "Additional Stars whose Spectra have a Bright H α Line" (1950, with Paul W. Merrill)
- "The Astronomer's Most Useful Chart" (1951)
- "Classifying Stars by their Spectra" (1953)

== Personal life ==
Cora Burwell lived in Pasadena, and later in Monrovia with her sister, Priscilla Burwell. She died in 1982, two days before her 99th birthday, in Los Angeles.
