= List of stars in Scutum =

This is the list of notable stars in the constellation Scutum, sorted by decreasing brightness.

Name	B	Var	HD	HIP	RA	Dec	vis. mag.	abs. mag.	Dist. (ly)	Sp. class	Notes
α Sct	α		171443	91117	18^{h} 35^{m} 12.44^{s}	−08° 14′ 35.9″	3.85	0.21	174	K2III	Tianbian, suspected variable, V_{max} = 3.81^{m}, V_{min} = 3.87^{m}
β Sct	β		173764	92175	18^{h} 47^{m} 10.48^{s}	−04° 44′ 52.2″	4.22	−2.41	689	G5II...	
ζ Sct	ζ		169156	90135	18^{h} 23^{m} 39.55^{s}	−08° 56′ 04.2″	4.66	0.82	191	K0III	
γ Sct	γ		170296	90595	18^{h} 29^{m} 11.85^{s}	−14° 33′ 56.9″	4.67	−0.09	291	A1IV/V	
δ Sct	δ		172748	91726	18^{h} 42^{m} 16.42^{s}	−09° 03′ 09.2″	4.70 (4.60–4.79)	0.91	187	F2IIIp d Del	triple star; prototype Delta Scuti variable, V_{max} = 4.6^{m}, V_{min} = 4.79^{m}, P = 0.1937697 d
η Sct	η		175751	93026	18^{h} 57^{m} 03.63^{s}	−05° 50′ 46.4″	4.83	0.82	207	K1III	
ε Sct	ε		173009	91845	18^{h} 43^{m} 31.24^{s}	−08° 16′ 30.9″	4.88	−1.14	522	G8II	
HD 175156			175156	92814	18^{h} 54^{m} 43.12^{s}	−15° 36′ 10.9″	5.08	−3.46	1663	B3II	
HD 171391	q		171391	91105	18^{h} 35^{m} 02.36^{s}	−10° 58′ 37.9″	5.12	0.38	290	G8III	suspected variable
R Sct		R	173819	92202	18^{h} 47^{m} 28.98^{s}	−05° 42′ 18.3″	5.38 (4.5–8.2)	−2.79	1405	K0Ibpvar	RV Tauri variable, V_{max} = 4.2^{m}, V_{min} = 8.6^{m}, P = 146.5 d
V450 Sct		V450	170975	90913	18^{h} 32^{m} 43.32^{s}	−14° 51′ 56.4″	5.47	−2.48	1268	K3Iab	semiregular variable
HD 173638			173638	92136	18^{h} 46^{m} 43.32^{s}	−10° 07′ 30.1″	5.69			F2Ib-II	suspected irregular variable, V_{max} = 5.64^{m}, V_{min} = 5.81^{m}
HD 169033			169033	90096	18^{h} 23^{m} 12.17^{s}	−12° 00′ 52.9″	5.71	−0.66	612	B5V	
HD 171130			171130	90991	18^{h} 33^{m} 39.00^{s}	−14° 51′ 12.9″	5.74	1.68	211	A0/A1V	
HD 170740			170740	90804	18^{h} 31^{m} 25.69^{s}	−10° 47′ 44.9″	5.77	−0.87	694	B2V	double star; suspected variable
HD 172348			172348	91532	18^{h} 40^{m} 00.40^{s}	−07° 47′ 26.5″	5.82	−0.22	527	K4III	
HD 174464			174464	92488	18^{h} 50^{m} 58.51^{s}	−09° 46′ 26.8″	5.82	−2.51	1509	F2Ib	
HD 174208			174208	92391	18^{h} 49^{m} 40.96^{s}	−05° 54′ 46.2″	5.99	−2.31	1489	K2Ib	
V432 Sct		V432	170397	90651	18^{h} 29^{m} 46.75^{s}	−14° 34′ 55.3″	6.02	1.32	284	Ap	α² CVn variable, ΔV = 0.012^{m}, P = 2.1912 d
HD 172831			172831	91751	18^{h} 42^{m} 36.12^{s}	−07° 04′ 25.1″	6.13	1.77	243	K0.5III	
HD 170547			170547	90692	18^{h} 30^{m} 14.30^{s}	−05° 43′ 26.9″	6.27	0.02	579	G8II-III	
HD 174866			174866	92674	18^{h} 53^{m} 01.80^{s}	−09° 34′ 32.0″	6.27	1.23	332	A7Vn	
HD 169370			169370	90238	18^{h} 24^{m} 42.05^{s}	−07° 04′ 33.1″	6.28	1.61	281	K0	
HD 173093			173093	91880	18^{h} 43^{m} 51.22^{s}	−06° 49′ 04.8″	6.30	2.09	227	F7V	
HD 169009			169009	90083	18^{h} 23^{m} 02.10^{s}	−10° 13′ 08.1″	6.32	1.21	343	B9.5V	suspected variable
HD 170902			170902	90884	18^{h} 32^{m} 20.66^{s}	−14° 38′ 39.2″	6.36	2.01	241	A4/A5IV/V	
HD 171149			171149	90967	18^{h} 33^{m} 22.71^{s}	−05° 54′ 41.9″	6.36	1.07	373	A0Vn	
HD 172594			172594	91677	18^{h} 41^{m} 42.46^{s}	−14° 33′ 51.3″	6.40	−4.34	4592	F2/F3Ib/II	
HD 174328			174328	92456	18^{h} 50^{m} 31.17^{s}	−13° 34′ 20.1″	6.48	−2.03	1638	K1II/III	
HD 171957			171957	91369	18^{h} 38^{m} 04.48^{s}	−14° 00′ 17.1″	6.49	−0.15	694	B8II/III	
HD 174005			174005	92296	18^{h} 48^{m} 39.49^{s}	−06° 00′ 15.8″	6.49	0.45	527	A2	
HD 169913			169913	90437	18^{h} 27^{m} 08.86^{s}	−08° 02′ 25.6″	6.50	1.51	325	K0	
HD 169454		V430	169454	90281	18^{h} 25^{m} 15.19^{s}	−13° 58′ 42.3″	6.64			B1Ia	α Cyg variable, V_{max} = 6.5^{m}, V_{min} = 6.64^{m}
S Sct		S	174325	92442	18^{h} 50^{m} 20.04^{s}	−07° 54′ 27.4″	6.80		1260	C	semiregular variable, V_{max} = 6.6^{m}, V_{min} = 7.3^{m}, P = 149.7 d
V496 Sct		V496			18^{h} 43^{m} 45.57^{s}	−07° 36′ 42.0″	7.10				nova, V_{max} = 7.10^{m}, V_{min} = <19^{m}
RZ Sct		RZ	169753	90382	18^{h} 26^{m} 33.52^{s}	−09° 12′ 06.0″	7.53		2260	B3Ib	Algol variable, V_{max} = 7.34^{m}, V_{min} = 8.84^{m}, P = 15.1902079 d
HD 173219		V447	173219	91946	18^{h} 44^{m} 33.34^{s}	−07° 06′ 38.2″	7.88			B1:V:npe	Be star, ΔV = 0.12^{m}
SS Sct		SS	173058	91867	18^{h} 43^{m} 43.51^{s}	−07° 43′ 51.9″	7.90			F8	Cepheid variable, V_{max} = 7.9^{m}, V_{min} = 8.43^{m}, P = 3.671253 d
EW Sct		EW	171955	91342	18^{h} 37^{m} 51.11^{s}	−06° 47′ 48.5″	7.96		1450	G5	double-mode Cepheid variable, V_{max} = 7.6^{m}, V_{min} = 8.2^{m}, P = 5.82363 d
V475 Sct		V475			18^{h} 49^{m} 37.60^{s}	−09° 33′ 15.9″					nova, V_{max} = 8.4^{m}, V_{min} = <16^{m}
RU Sct		RU	172730	91697	18^{h} 41^{m} 56.38^{s}	−04° 06′ 38.4″	8.84		801	G5	Cepheid variable, V_{max} = 8.84^{m}, V_{min} = 9.96^{m}, P = 19.7035 d
RY Sct		RY	169515	90303	18^{h} 25^{m} 31.48^{s}	−12° 41′ 24.2″	9.12			B1IIIpe	Beta Lyrae variable, V_{max} = 9.12^{m}, V_{min} = 9.72^{m}, P = 11.12471 d
HD 173637		V455	173637	92128	18^{h} 46^{m} 38.08^{s}	−07° 55′ 55.1″	9.29			B1IV	γ Cas variable
EV Sct		EV		91239	18^{h} 36^{m} 39.60^{s}	−08° 11′ 05.4″	9.90			G0II	Cepheid variable, V_{max} = 9.9^{m}, V_{min} = 10.32^{m}, P = 3.09099 d
RS Sct		RS		92340	18^{h} 49^{m} 11.25^{s}	−10° 14′ 27.8″	9.95		860	G0	Beta Lyrae variable, V_{max} = 9.78^{m}, V_{min} = 10.91^{m}, P = 0.6642384 d
AS 314		V452		91477	18^{h} 39^{m} 26.11^{s}	−13° 50′ 47.2″	10.01		32600	A3:Ia	α Cyg variable; candidate luminous blue variable
X Sct		X		90791	18^{h} 31^{m} 19.75^{s}	−13° 06′ 29.5″	10.07		1330	F5...	Cepheid variable, V_{max} = 9.5^{m}, V_{min} = 10.42^{m}, P = 4.19807 d
V443 Sct		V443			18^{h} 49^{m} 38.95^{s}	−06° 11′ 15.9″	10.48				nova, V_{max} = 8.5^{m}, V_{min} = <13.2^{m}
UY Sct		UY			18^{h} 27^{m} 36.53^{s}	−12° 27′ 58.9″	10.56			M2-4Ia-Iab	One of the largest known stars; semiregular variable
UZ Sct		UZ			18^{h} 31^{m} 22.37^{s}	−22° 55′ 43.34″		10.91	176.35275	G0 D	Yellow giant.
CM Sct		CM		91738	18^{h} 42^{m} 26.82^{s}	−05° 20′ 27.0″	10.93				Cepheid variable, V_{max} = 10.79^{m}, V_{min} = 11.49^{m}, P = 3.916997 d
TY Sct		TY		91706	18^{h} 42^{m} 07.92^{s}	−04° 17′ 36.5″	11.00		733	F8	Cepheid variable, V_{max} = 10.31^{m}, V_{min} = 11.25^{m}, P = 11.05302 d
V476 Sct		V476			18^{h} 32^{m} 04.75^{s}	−06° 43′ 34.3″	11.10				nova, V_{max} = 11.1^{m}, V_{min} = <17^{m}
LS 5039		V479			18^{h} 26^{m} 15.06^{s}	−14° 50′ 54.3″	11.23			O(f)N6.5V	High-mass X-ray binary; microquasar; gamma-ray emitter; V_{max} = 11.22^{m}, V_{min} = 11.35^{m}, P = 3.906 d
V367 Sct		V367			18^{h} 33^{m} 35.24^{s}	−10° 25′ 38.0″	11.58			F5II	double-mode Cepheid variable, V_{max} = 11.21^{m}, V_{min} = 11.91^{m}, P = 6.29307 d
FR Sct		FR		90115	18^{h} 23^{m} 22.79^{s}	−12° 40′ 51.8″	11.60			M1:II	slow irregular variable; Algol variable
MWC 300		V431		90617	18^{h} 29^{m} 25.69^{s}	−06° 04′ 37.3″	11.60			Bpe	α^{2} CVn variable, V_{max} = 11.6^{m}, V_{min} = 12.1^{m}, P = 2.1510141 d
BX Sct		BX			18^{h} 50^{m} 09.24^{s}	−04° 22′ 05.2″	11.70			F6	Cepheid variable, V_{max} = 11.7^{m}, V_{min} = 12.62^{m}, P = 6.41133 d
CoRoT-17					18^{h} 34^{m} 47^{s}	−06° 36′ 44″	15.46		3001	G2V	has a transiting planet (b)
4U 1850-087					18^{h} 53^{m} 04.89^{s}	−08° 42′ 19.7″	21.00		22500		Low-mass X-ray binary
CRL 2136					18^{h} 22^{m} 26.59^{s}	−13° 30′ 15.7″					massive young star
OH 17.7-2.0		V445			18^{h} 30^{m} 30.62^{s}	−14° 28′ 55.8″				K2/K3:II/III:	semiregular variable
OH 26.5+0.6		V437			18^{h} 37^{m} 32.51^{s}	−05° 23′ 59.2″				M	Mira variable
PSR B1829-10					18^{h} 32^{m} 40.9^{s}	−10° 21′ 34″				n/a	pulsar
PSR B1822-09					18^{h} 25^{m} 30.55^{s}	−09° 35′ 22.1″					pulsar
PSR B1823-13					18^{h} 26^{m} 13.18^{s}	−13° 34′ 46.8″					pulsar
PSR B1828-10					18^{h} 30^{m} 47.57^{s}	−10° 59′ 27.9″					pulsar; possible planetary companion
PSR J1833-1034					18^{h} 33^{m} 33.57^{s}	−10° 34′ 07.5″					pulsar
1E 1841-045					18^{h} 41^{m} 19.34^{s}	−04° 56′ 11.16″					magnetar in supernova remnant
EU Sct		EU			18^{h} 56^{m} 13.12^{s}	−04° 12′ 32.3″					nova
V368 Sct		V368			18^{h} 45^{m} 43.53^{s}	−08° 33′ 00.9″					nova
V373 Sct		V373			18^{h} 55^{m} 26.71^{s}	−07° 43′ 05.5″					nova
Table legend: • Name = Proper name • B = Bayer designation • F or/and G. = Flamsteed designation or Gould designation • Var = Variable-star designation • HD = Henry Draper Catalogue designation number • HIP = Hipparcos Catalogue designation number • RA = Right ascension for the Epoch/Equinox J2000.0 • Dec = Declination for the Epoch/Equinox J2000.0 • vis. mag. = visual magnitude (m or m_{v}), also known as apparent magnitude • abs. mag. = absolute magnitude (M_{v}) • Dist. (ly) = Distance in light-years from Earth • Sp. class = Spectral class of the star in the stellar classification system • Notes = Common name(s) or alternate name(s); comments; notable properties [for example: multiple star status, range of variability if it is a variable star, exoplanets, etc.]

== See also ==
- List of stars by constellation
