= List of star systems within 200–250 light-years =

This is a list of star systems within 200–250 light years of Earth.

== List ==
Key
#	Visible to the unaided eye
$	Bright star (absolute magnitude of +8.5 or brighter)
‡	White dwarf
§	Brown dwarf or sub-brown dwarf
*	Nearest in constellation

System	Star or (sub-) brown dwarf	Distance (ly)	Constellation	Coordinates: RA, Dec (Ep J2000, Eq J2000)	Stellar class	Apparent magnitude (V)	Parallax (mas)	Notes and additional references
WASP-107		200			K			Has 1 confirmed exoplanet (WASP-107b).
HD 184010		200			KOIII-IV	5.89		Has 3 exoplanets.
HD 140283 (Methuselah star)		200.5 ± 0.3			G0IV-V m-5	7.205±0.02		One of the oldest known star and one of the closest metal-poor (population II) stars to Earth.
Delta Scuti		201 ± 1	Scutum		F2 IIIp	4.60 - 4.79		
Kappa Leonis (Al Minliar al Asad)		201 ± 3	Leo		K2 III	4.460		
HD 38677		202			F8V			Has 4 exoplanets.
K2-141		202			K5/6			Has a confirmed exoplanet (K2-141b).
Iota Antliae		202 ± 2	Antlia		K1 III	+4.60		
Epsilon Trianguli Australis		202 ± 2	Triangulum		K0 III	4.11		
107 Aquarii A (i² Aquarii)		202 ± 3	Aquarius		F2 III	5.72		
12 Hydrae (D Hydrae)		202 ± 8	Hydra		G8 IIIb CN-1	4.32		
HD 43197 (Amadioha)		203.6 ± 0.1			G8/K0 IV/V	8.98		
Zeta Pegasi (Homam)		204 ± 2	Pegasus		B8 V	3.414		
TOI-178		204.9 ± 0.6			K7V	11.95		Has 6 exoplanets.
Sigma Aquarii		206 ± 5	Aquarius		A0 IVs	4.81		
Wolf 354		206.4			K3D			
Gamma Pyxidis		207	Pyxis		K2.5III			
Kepler-37		208.7 ± 0.1			G8V	9.710		Has 3 confirmed and 1 unconfirmed exoplanets.
83 Aquarii (h Aquarii)	A	209 ± 8	Aquarius		F2Vn	5.43		
83 Aquarii (h Aquarii)	B	209 ± 8	Aquarius		F2V			
Zeta Scuti		210 ± 10	Scutum		G9 IIIb Fe-0.5	4.66		
HD 108236		210.6 ± 0.2			G5V	9.24		Has 5 exoplanets.
2M1207 (2MASS J12073346–3932539)		211 ± 2			M8IVe	20.15		Has one known Planetary Object also known as 2M1207b.
Iota Aquarii		211 ± 3	Aquarius		B8 V	4.279		
Omicron Cephei	A	211 ± 7	Cepheus		G8III	4.86+7.13		
Omicron Cephei	B	211 ± 7	Cepheus		F6V			
Gamma Gruis (Aldhanab)		211 ± 9	Grus		B8 III or B8IV-Vs	3.003		
TOI-1203		212			G3V			
GD 40		212.3 ± 0.6			DB	15.56		
Eta Scuti		213 ± 2	Scutum		K1-III	4.83		
HD 109246 (Funi)		214			G0V			
Upsilon² Eridani (Theemin)		214 ± 3	Eridanus		G8+ III	3.804		
HD 201507		214 ± 4			F5 IV			
HD 80607		216.8 ± 0.5			G5	+9.090		
K2-72		216.9 ± 0.4			M2.7 V			Has 4 exoplanets.
HD 80606		217.2 ± 0.5			G5	+9.00		Has 1 exoplanet.
Kepler-138		218.9 ± 0.1			M1V		13.040±0.092	Has 3 confirmed and 1 unconfirmed exoplanets.
TOI-512		219.16±0.14			K0			Has one known exoplanet.
86 Aquarii (c¹ Aquarii)		220 ± 10	Aquarius		G8 III	+4.47		
K2-233		221			K3			Has 3 exoplanets.
Kappa Aquarii (Situla)		222 ± 1	Aquarius		K1.5 IIIb CN0.5	5.030±0.009		
Xi Andromedae (Adhil)		223±2	Andromeda	01^{h} 22^{m} 20.42008^{s} +45° 31′ 43.5962″	K0IIIb	4.90	14.6042±0.1028	
Upsilon Librae		224 ± 3	Libra		K3 III	3.628		
Phi Aquarii		227 ± 4	Aquarius		M1.5 III	4.223		
Alpha Cassiopeiae (Schedar)		228 ± 2	Cassiopeia		K0-IIIa	2.240		
31 Vulpeculae	A	228 ± 3	Vulpecula		G7IIIa Fe-1 Ba	4.56		
31 Vulpeculae	B	228 ± 3	Vulpecula		D			
Sigma Sagittarii (Nunki)	A	228 ± 5	Sagittarius		B2.5 V	2.05		The closest core-collapse supernova candidate to Earth.
Sigma Sagittarii (Nunki)	B	228 ± 5	Sagittarius		B			The closest core-collapse supernova candidate to Earth.
1SWASP J093010.78+533859.5 (V441/V442 Ursae Majoris)	A	228.7 ± 0.3	Ursa Major		K1V	10.98		
1SWASP J093010.78+533859.5 (V441/V442 Ursae Majoris)	B	228.7 ± 0.3	Ursa Major		K5V			
1SWASP J093010.78+533859.5 (V441/V442 Ursae Majoris)	C	228.7 ± 0.3	Ursa Major		K3V			
1SWASP J093010.78+533859.5 (V441/V442 Ursae Majoris)	D	228.7 ± 0.3	Ursa Major		K3V			
HD 148427 (Timir)		229.6 ± 0.3			K0IV	6.903		
Epsilon Crucis (Ginan)		230 ± 2	Crux		K3 III	3.58		
Mu Ursae Majoris (Tania Australis)		230 ± 9	Ursa Major		M0 IIIab	3.06		
Mu Geminorum (Tejat)		230 ± 10	Gemini		M3 III	2.75 - 3.02		
Psi³ Aquarii		231 ± 2	Aquarius		A0 V	4.98		
HAT-P-20		232.9 ± 0.3			K3V	11.35		Has one confirmed exoplanet (HAT-P-20b).
Beta Boötis (Nekkar)		235 ± 2	Boötes		G8IIIa Fe-0.5	3.488		
Theta¹ Crucis		235 ± 3	Crux		A3(m)A8-A8	4.30		
Zeta Ceti (Baten Kaitos)		235 ± 10	Cetus		K0 III Ba0.1	3.742		
Epsilon Boötis	A (Izar)	236 ± 8	Boötes		K0 II-III			
Epsilon Boötis	B (Pulcherrima)	236 ± 8	Boötes		A2 V			
HD 200946		236.9 ± 0.5			G8 IV			
HD 203473		237.4 ± 0.6			G6V	8.23		
GP Comae Berenices (G 61–29)		237.5 ± 0.8	Coma Berenices		DBe	15.69		
HD 192699 (Chechia)		237.6 ± 0.5			G8 IV	6.44		Has one confirmed exoplanet (HD 192699b/Khomsa).
HD 149143 (Rosalíadecastro)		239.3 ± 0.4			G0 IV or G3V	7.89		
TOI-1260		239.5			G			Has 3 exoplanets.
HD 82785		239.9 ± 0.5			F2IV/V	6.43		
HD 109000		240			A8III			
HD 128717		240±0.5			F8			Has one known exoplanet.
PHL 5038	A	240 ± 2			DAZ			
PHL 5038	B	240 ± 2			L8-L9			
Gaia-4		241			K			Has one confirmed exoplanet (Gaia-4 b).
Eta Aurigae (Haedus)		243 ± 4	Auriga		B3 V	3.18		
39 Ceti (AY Ceti)	A	244 ± 2	Cetus		G5IIIe	5.35 - 5.58		
39 Ceti (AY Ceti)	B	244 ± 2	Cetus		D			
Epsilon Aquarii (Albali)	A	244 ± 7	Aquarius		A1 V	3.77		
Epsilon Aquarii (Albali)	B	244 ± 7	Aquarius		KV			
18 Delphini (Musica)		245 ± 1	Delphinus		G6III	5.506		
LP 358-499		245.3			G			Has 4 exoplanets.
Kepler-16	A	245.4 ± 0.5			K7V			Has one confirmed exoplanet (Kepler-16b).
Kepler-16	B	245.4 ± 0.5			M			Has one confirmed exoplanet (Kepler-16b).
Eta Virginis (Zaniah)		246 ± 3	Virgo		A2 V	3.890		
HD 7977 (TYC 4034-1077-1/USNO-A2 1500–01356484)		246.9 ± 0.6			G3	9.04		It is notable for its close flyby of the Solar System 2.8 million years ago.
25 Aquarii		247 ± 2	Aquarius		K0 III	5.09		
14 Andromedae (Veritate)		248 ± 1	Andromeda		K0 III	5.22		
HD 149026 (Ogma)		248.6 ± 0.3			G0 IV	8.15		
Alpha Ceti (Menkar)		249 ± 8	Cetus		M1.5 IIIa	2.53		
System	Star or (sub-) brown dwarf	Distance (ly)	Constellation	Coordinates: RA, Dec (Ep J2000, Eq J2000)	Stellar class	Apparent magnitude (V)	Parallax (mas)	Notes and additional references

== See also ==
- List of star systems within 150–200 light-years
- List of star systems within 250–300 light-years
