= 12 Aquilae =

Star in the constellation Aquila

- Location of 12 Aquilae (circled)

Observation data Epoch J2000 Equinox ICRS
- Constellation: Aquila
- Right ascension: 19^{h} 01^{m} 40.82887^{s}
- Declination: −05° 44′ 20.7222″
- Apparent magnitude (V): 4.02

Characteristics
- Spectral type: K1 III
- U−B color index: +1.04
- B−V color index: +1.104
- R−I color index: 0.54

Astrometry
Radial velocity (R_{v})	−43.92±0.18 km/s
Proper motion (μ)	RA: −22.592 mas/yr Dec.: −43.08 mas/yr
Parallax (π)	21.5669±0.2199 mas
Distance	151 ± 2 ly (46.4 ± 0.5 pc)
Absolute magnitude (M_{V})	0.726

Details
Mass	1.185±0.282 M_{☉}
Radius	12.28±0.14 R_{☉}
Luminosity	58.2±3.1 L_{☉}
Surface gravity (log g)	2.31±0.11 cgs
Temperature	4,662±59 K
Metallicity [Fe/H]	−0.08±0.07 dex
Rotational velocity (v sin i)	3.6 km/s
Age	3.64±1.43 Gyr

Other designations
- i Aquilae, BD−05°4840, HD 176678, HIP 93429, HR 7193, SAO 142931

Database references
SIMBAD	data

12 Aquilae (abbreviated 12 Aql) is a star in the equatorial constellation of Aquila. 12 Aquilae has the Bayer designation of i Aquilae and is most easily recognized in the sky being next to the brighter star λ (lambda) Aquilae.

In Chinese, 天弁 (Tiān Biàn), meaning Market Officer, refers to an asterism consisting of 12 Aquilae, α Scuti, δ Scuti, ε Scuti, β Scuti, η Scuti, λ Aquilae, 15 Aquilae and 14 Aquilae. Consequently, 12 Aquilae itself is known as 天弁六 (Tiān Biàn liù, English: the Sixth Star of Market Officer.)

This star has an apparent visual magnitude of 4.02, which is bright enough to be seen with the naked eye, although, according to the Bortle Dark-Sky Scale, it is a challenge to view from the inner city. Based upon an annual parallax shift of 21.57 mas, the distance to this star is 151 light-years (46 parsecs) with a margin of error of one light-year. This is an evolved giant star of stellar class K1 III. It has 12 times the radius of the Sun and shines with 58 times the Sun's luminosity. This energy is being radiated from its outer atmosphere at an effective temperature of 4,662 K, giving it the cool orange hue of a K-type star.
