= Scutum in Chinese astronomy =

According to traditional Chinese uranography, the modern constellation Scutum is located within the northern quadrant of the sky, which is symbolized as the Black Tortoise of the North (北方玄武, Běi Fāng Xuán Wǔ).

The name of the western constellation in modern Chinese is 盾牌座 (dùn pái zuò), meaning "the shield constellation".

== Stars ==
The map of Chinese constellation in constellation Scutum area consists of :

| Four Symbols | Mansion (Chinese name) | Romanization | Translation | Asterisms (Chinese name) | Romanization | Translation | Western star name | Proper Name | Chinese star name | Romanization | Translation |
|---|---|---|---|---|---|---|---|---|---|---|---|
| The Black Tortoise of the North (北方玄武) | 斗 | Dǒu | Dipper | 天弁 | Tiānbiàn | Market Officer | | | | | |
| The Black Tortoise of the North (北方玄武) | 斗 | Dǒu | Dipper | 天弁 | Tiānbiàn | Market Officer | α Sct | Tianbian | 天弁一 | Tiānbiànyī | 1st star |
| The Black Tortoise of the North (北方玄武) | 斗 | Dǒu | Dipper | 天弁 | Tiānbiàn | Market Officer | δ Sct | | 天弁二 | Tiānbiànèr | 2nd star |
| The Black Tortoise of the North (北方玄武) | 斗 | Dǒu | Dipper | 天弁 | Tiānbiàn | Market Officer | ε Sct | | 天弁三 | Tiānbiànsān | 3rd star |
| The Black Tortoise of the North (北方玄武) | 斗 | Dǒu | Dipper | 天弁 | Tiānbiàn | Market Officer | β Sct | | 天弁四 | Tiānbiànsì | 4th star |
| The Black Tortoise of the North (北方玄武) | 斗 | Dǒu | Dipper | 天弁 | Tiānbiàn | Market Officer | η Sct | | 天弁五 | Tiānbiànwǔ | 5th star |
| The Black Tortoise of the North (北方玄武) | 斗 | Dǒu | Dipper | 天弁 | Tiānbiàn | Market Officer | HD 174464 | | 天弁增六 | Tiānbiànzēngliù | 6th additional star |

== See also ==
- Traditional Chinese star names
- Chinese constellations
