= NGC 6605 =

Open cluster in the constellation Serpens

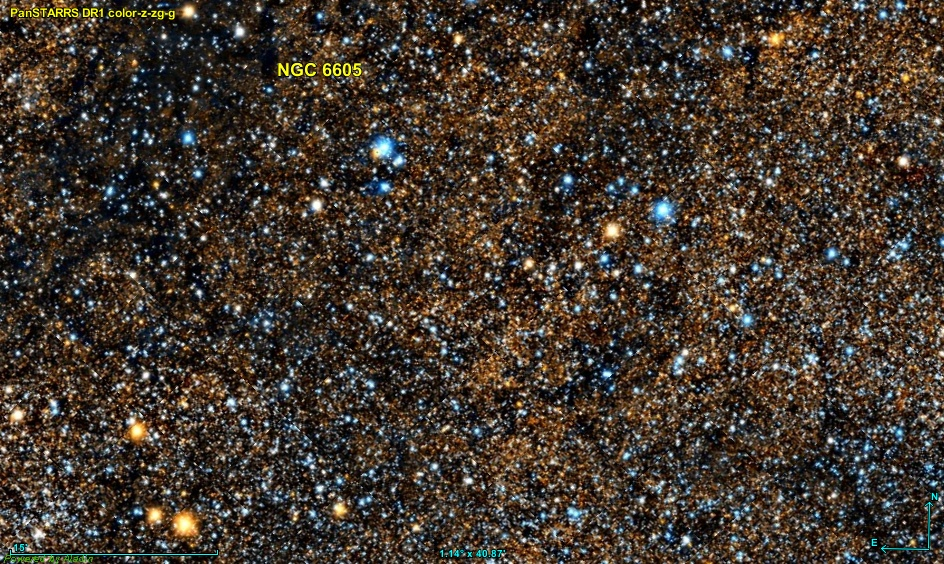

Observation data (J2000 epoch)
- Right ascension: 18^{h} 16^{m} 22^{s}
- Declination: −15° 00′ 55″
- Apparent magnitude (V): 6
- Apparent dimensions (V): 6.3 arcmin

Physical characteristics

Associations
- Galaxy: Milky Way

NGC 6605 is an open cluster located in the constellation Serpens. It was discovered by the British astronomer John Herschel in 1826.

== Description ==
With a visual magnitude of 6.0, this cluster is visible to the naked eye from a very dark location free of light pollution. Elsewhere, however, the cluster can be observed with small binoculars.

NGC 6605 is located approximately 3.1 degrees southwest of Gamma Scuti, a magnitude 4.67 star in the constellation Scutum.

The apparent size of the cluster is 29 arc minutes, which, given the distance of 1144 pc and through simple calculation, equates to an actual size of about 31 light years.

== See also ==
- Pleiades
