= Messier 26 =

Open cluster in the constellation Scutum

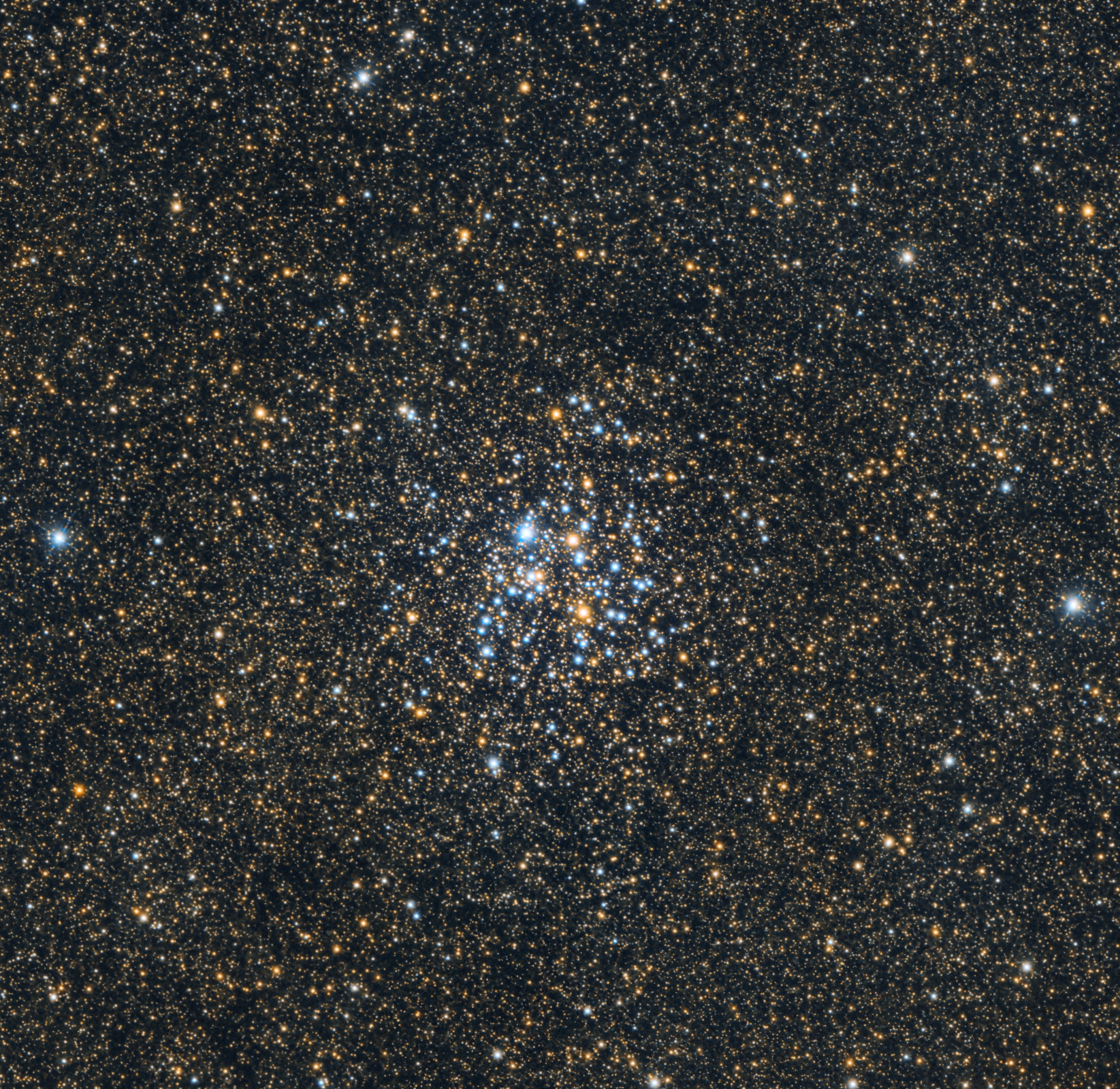
- Open cluster Messier 26 captured in 2026

Observation data (J2000.0 epoch)
- Right ascension: 18^{h} 45^{m} 18.0^{s}
- Declination: −09° 23′ 00″
- Distance: 5,160 ly (1,582 pc)
- Apparent magnitude (V): 8.0
- Apparent dimensions (V): 14′

Physical characteristics
- Radius: 11 ly
- Estimated age: 85.3 million years
- Other designations: Messier 26, NGC 6694, Cr 389, C 1842-094

Associations
- Constellation: Scutum

Messier 26, also known as NGC 6694, is an open cluster of stars in the southern constellation of Scutum. It was discovered by Charles Messier in 1764. (Note: On June 20) This 8th magnitude cluster is a challenge to find in ideal skies with typical binoculars, where it can be, with any modern minimum 3-inch (76 mm) aperture device. It is south-southwest of the open cluster Messier 11 and is 14′ across. About 25 stars are visible in a telescope with a 150–200 mm (6–8 in) aperture.

M26 spans a linear size of 22 light years across with a tidal radius of 25 light-years, and is at a distance of 5,160 light years from the Earth. The brightest star is of magnitude 11 and the age of this cluster has been calculated to be 85.3 million years. It includes one known spectroscopic binary system.

An interesting feature of M26 is a region of low star density near the nucleus. A hypothesis was that it was caused by an obscuring cloud of interstellar matter between us and the cluster, but a paper by James Cuffey suggested that this is not possible and that it really is a "shell of low stellar space density". In 2015, Michael Merrifield of the University of Nottingham said that there is, as yet, no clear explanation for the phenomenon.

== Gallery ==
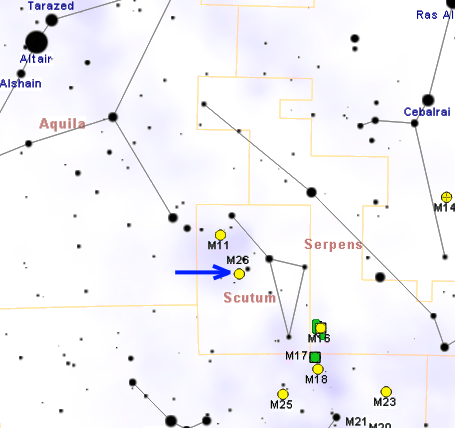
Map showing the location of M26 (Roberto Mura)

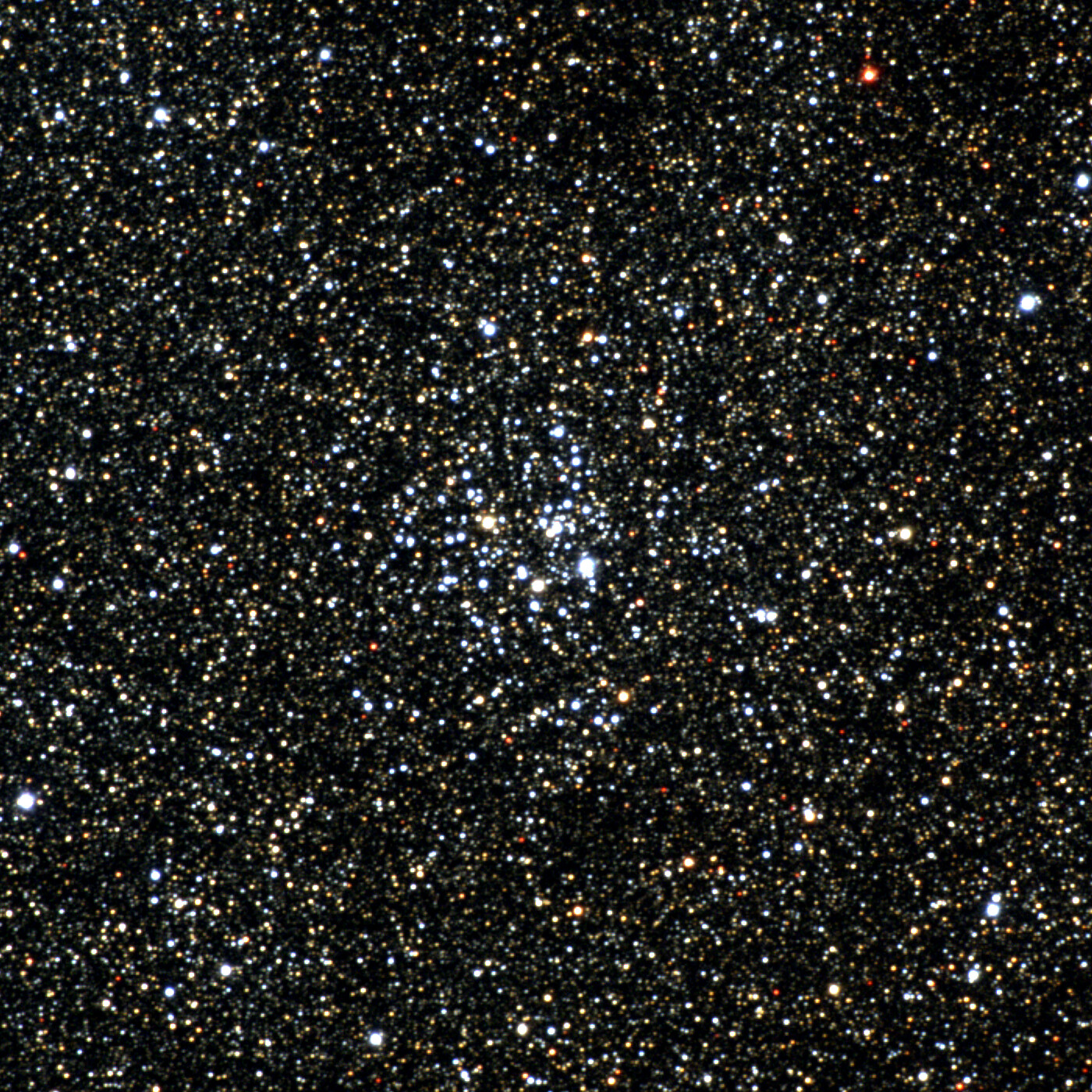
Hillary Mathis, Vanessa Harvey, REU program/NOIRLab/NSF/AURA

== See also ==
- List of Messier objects
- NGC 1193
