= 2MASS J18450079−1409036 =

Star system of two red dwarfs in the constellation Scutum

2MASS J18450079−1409036 / 2MASS J18450097−1409053
Observation data Epoch J2000.0 Equinox ICRS
- Constellation: Scutum
- 2MASS J18450079−1409036
- Right ascension: 18^{h} 45^{m} 00.79^{s}
- Declination: −14° 09′ 04.0″
- Apparent magnitude (V): 12.95
- 2MASS J18450097−1409053
- Right ascension: 18^{h} 45^{m} 00.98^{s}
- Declination: −14° 09′ 05.7″
- Apparent magnitude (V): 13.75

Characteristics
- Spectral type: M5 / M5

Astrometry

2MASS J18450079−1409036
Proper motion (μ)	RA: +47.53±0.04 mas/yr Dec.: −85.95±0.03 mas/yr
Parallax (π)	55.2002±0.0422 mas
Distance	59.09 ± 0.05 ly (18.12 ± 0.01 pc)

2MASS J18450097−1409053
Radial velocity (R_{v})	−23.0±0.3 km/s
Proper motion (μ)	RA: +33.48±0.04 mas/yr Dec.: −91.47±0.03 mas/yr
Parallax (π)	55.1253±0.0443 mas
Distance	59.17 ± 0.05 ly (18.14 ± 0.01 pc)

Orbit
Primary	2MASS J18450097−1409053 A
Name	2MASS J18450097−1409053 B
Period (P)	586 yr
Semi-major axis (a)	3.224±0.016" (52 AU)

Details

2MASS J18450079−1409036
Mass	0.2 M_{☉}
Radius	0.40 R_{☉}
Luminosity	0.012 L_{☉}
Surface gravity (log g)	4.57 cgs
Temperature	3,444 K

2MASS J18450097−1409053
Mass	0.2 M_{☉}
Radius	0.40 R_{☉}
Luminosity	0.018 L_{☉}
Surface gravity (log g)	4.50±0.05 cgs
Temperature	3,443 K
Metallicity [Fe/H]	−0.25±0.2 dex
Age	40±10 Myr

Other designations
- WDS J18450-1409
- A: 2MASS J18450079−1409036, UCAC3 152-2811762, UCAC4 380-128133
- B: 2MASS J18450097−1409053, UCAC3 152-281185, UCAC4 380-128136

Database references
SIMBAD	2MASS J18450079−1409036
- 2MASS J18450097−1409053

2MASS J18450079−1409036 and 2MASS J18450097−1409053 is a system of two red dwarf stars both of which have spectral types of M5, with projected separation of 3.2 seconds of arc. The system is located in the constellation Scutum. The Gaia parallaxes place the system at 18.2 parsecs (59 light-years) from Earth. Kinematically, it belongs to young (30-50 million years) Argus association.

2MASS J18450079−1409036 and 2MASS J18450097−1409053 appear to be a common proper motion pair, confirmed to be bound in 2016.
