= ASKAP J1839−0756 =

Neutron-star candidate

Observation data Epoch J2000 Equinox J2000
- Constellation: Scutum
- Right ascension: 18^{h} 39^{m} 50.57^{s}
- Declination: −07° 56′ 39.2″

Characteristics
- Evolutionary stage: Neutron star or magnetar (suspected)

Astrometry
Distance	4,000.0±1,300.0 pc

Details
Rotation	6.45 hours

Database references

ASKAP J1839−0756 is an unconfirmed neutron star/magnetar candidate located in the constellation Scutum, approximately 13,040 light years from Earth. With a rotation period of 6.45 hours, as of 2025 it is the slowest rotating neutron star candidate ever discovered. Objects with such properties are thought to be neutron stars with unusually very slow polar precession.
