= NGC 6712 =

Globular cluster in the constellation Scutum

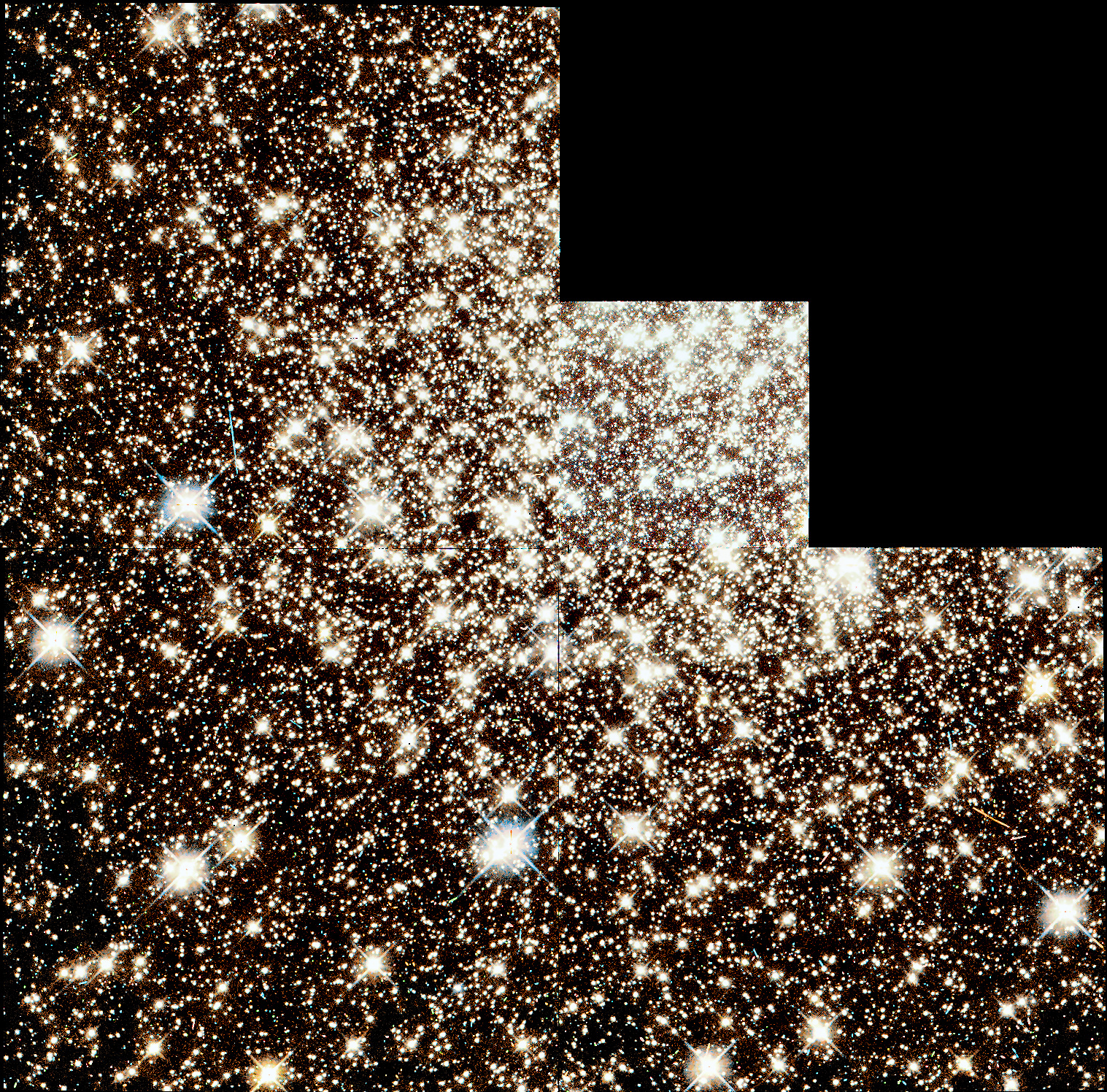
- NGC 6712, by HST

Observation data (J2000 epoch)
- Class: IX:
- Constellation: Scutum
- Right ascension: 18^{h} 53^{m} 04.32^{s}
- Declination: –08° 42′ 21.5″
- Distance: 26.4 kly (8.1 kpc)
- Apparent magnitude (V): +8.69
- Apparent dimensions (V): 7.2'

Physical characteristics
- Mass: 9.4×10^{4} M_{☉}
- Metallicity: [Fe/H] = –0.94 dex
- Estimated age: 10.4 Gyr
- Other designations: GCl 103, GC 4441

NGC 6712 is a globular cluster that was probably discovered by Le Gentil on July 9, 1749 when investigating the Milky Way star cloud in Aquila. He described it as a "true nebula," in contrast to the open star cluster M11. Independently discovered by William Herschel on June 16, 1784 and cataloged as H I.47; he also first classified it as a round nebula. John Herschel was the first to describe it as a globular star cluster during his observations in the 1830s. The cluster appears to be about 12 billion years old. It may have originally been significantly more massive having undergone tidal disruption and significant mass loss due to passing through the galactic disc. For a globular cluster, NGC 6712 is somewhat metal-rich.

NGC 6712 is home to a black widow pulsar named PSR J1853−0842A. Such systems involve an extremely rapidly rotating pulsar, accompanied by a low-mass star or brown dwarf. The high amounts of radiation emitted from the pulsar contributes to the evaporation of the low-mass companion, which has a mass between 0.018 and 0.036 solar masses. Although pulsars rotate more slowly with age, PSR J1853−0842A is accelerating, which would not be possible without it being within a globular cluster.
