= V373 Scuti =

1975 Nova in the constellation Scutum

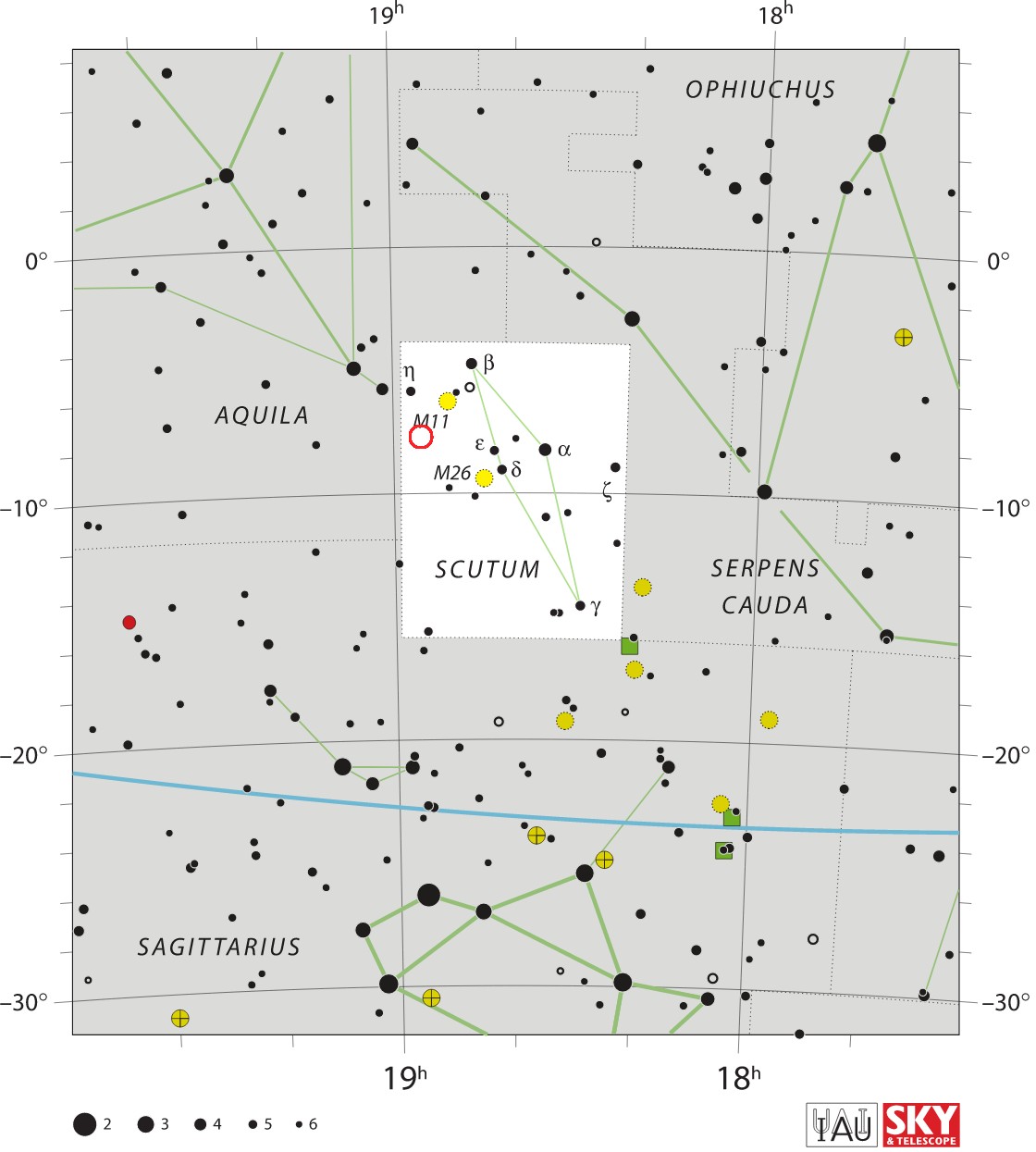
- Location of V373 Scuti (circled in red)

Observation data Epoch J2000.0 Equinox ICRS
- Constellation: Scutum
- Right ascension: 18^{h} 55^{m} 26.71^{s}
- Declination: −07° 43′ 05.5″
- Apparent magnitude (V): 7.1 (Max) – 18.7

Details
Mass	1.02 M_{☉}
Rotation	258.3 s

Other designations
- V373 Sct, AAVSO 1850-07, NOVA Sct 1975

Database references
SIMBAD	data

V373 Scuti was a nova which appeared in 1975 in the southern constellation of Scutum. It was announced on June 15, 1975 by Paul Wild at the Zimmerwald Observatory, Switzerland. At the time the magnitude was about 7.9. The peak magnitude of 7.1 occurred a month earlier on May 11.

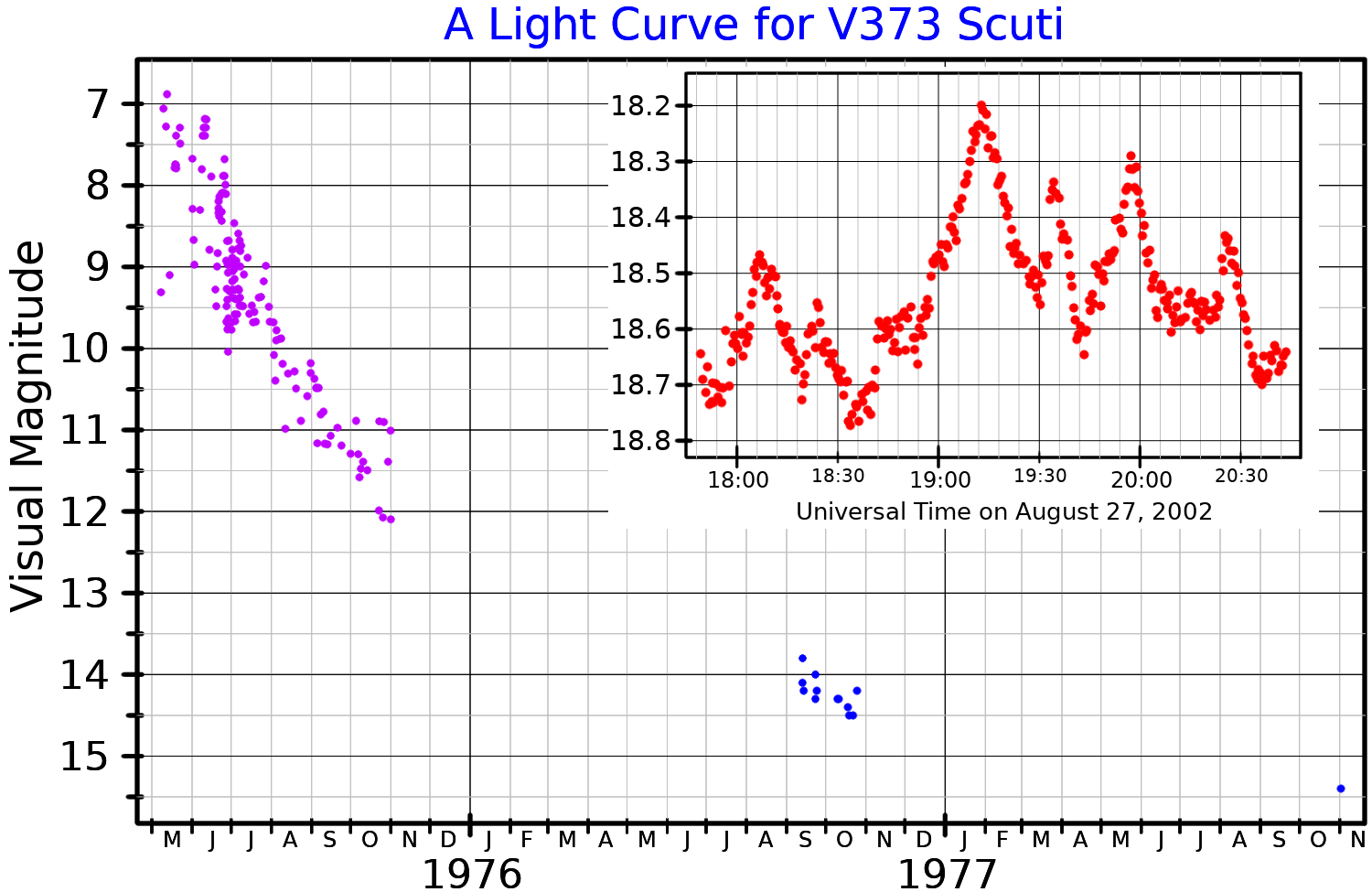
A visual band light curve for V373 Scuti. The main plot shows the decline from the nova event. Purple points are from Rosino (1978) and blue points are AAVSO data. The inset plot, adapted from Woudt and Warner (2003), shows short timescale variations continuing long after the nova event.

The light curve of this nova declined as a typical power law following the peak, but showed significant jittery behavior. After about 40–50 days emission lines began to appear in the spectrum, which allowed measurement of the mean expansion velocity as 955±130 km/s. The large amplitude flickering as well as other indicators suggest a magnetic influence, making this a candidate intermediate polar system. A luminosity modulation of 258.3 seconds is most likely due to rotation of the white dwarf. The system has an orbital period of 3.69 ± 0.07 h, and the light curve suggests a high orbital inclination.
