= FR Scuti =

Triple star system in the constellation Scutum

- Location of FR Scuti

Observation data Epoch J2000.0 Equinox ICRS
- Constellation: Scutum
- Right ascension: 18^{h} 23^{m} 22.79^{s}
- Declination: −12° 40′ 51.8″
- Apparent magnitude (V): 10.0 – 10.8

Characteristics
- Evolutionary stage: Red supergiant + OB stars
- Spectral type: M2.5Iabep + B
- Variable type: Algol + LC

Astrometry
Radial velocity (R_{v})	+22.16 km/s
Proper motion (μ)	RA: +0.187 mas/yr Dec.: −1.64 mas/yr
Parallax (π)	0.4154±0.0667 mas
Distance	approx. 8,000 ly (approx. 2,400 pc)

Other designations
- FR Sct, HIP 90115, TIC 119217144, TYC 5698-2284-1, IRAS 18205-1242, 2MASS J18232280-1240518, SDSS J143900.24+641730.1

Database references
SIMBAD	data

FR Scuti (FR Sct) is a hierarchical triple star system located in the constellation of Scutum. It is classified as a VV Cephei-type system, which typically consists of a cool red supergiant and a hot companion, but in this case the hot component is itself a close binary, making the overall system a triple. It was once thought to be a symbiotic binary, exhibiting unique spectral emission lines and photometric variability, but is now though to be a detached eclipsing binary with additional irregular pulsations of the cool supergiant. Another star system similar to FR Scuti is TIC 290061484.

== Characteristics ==
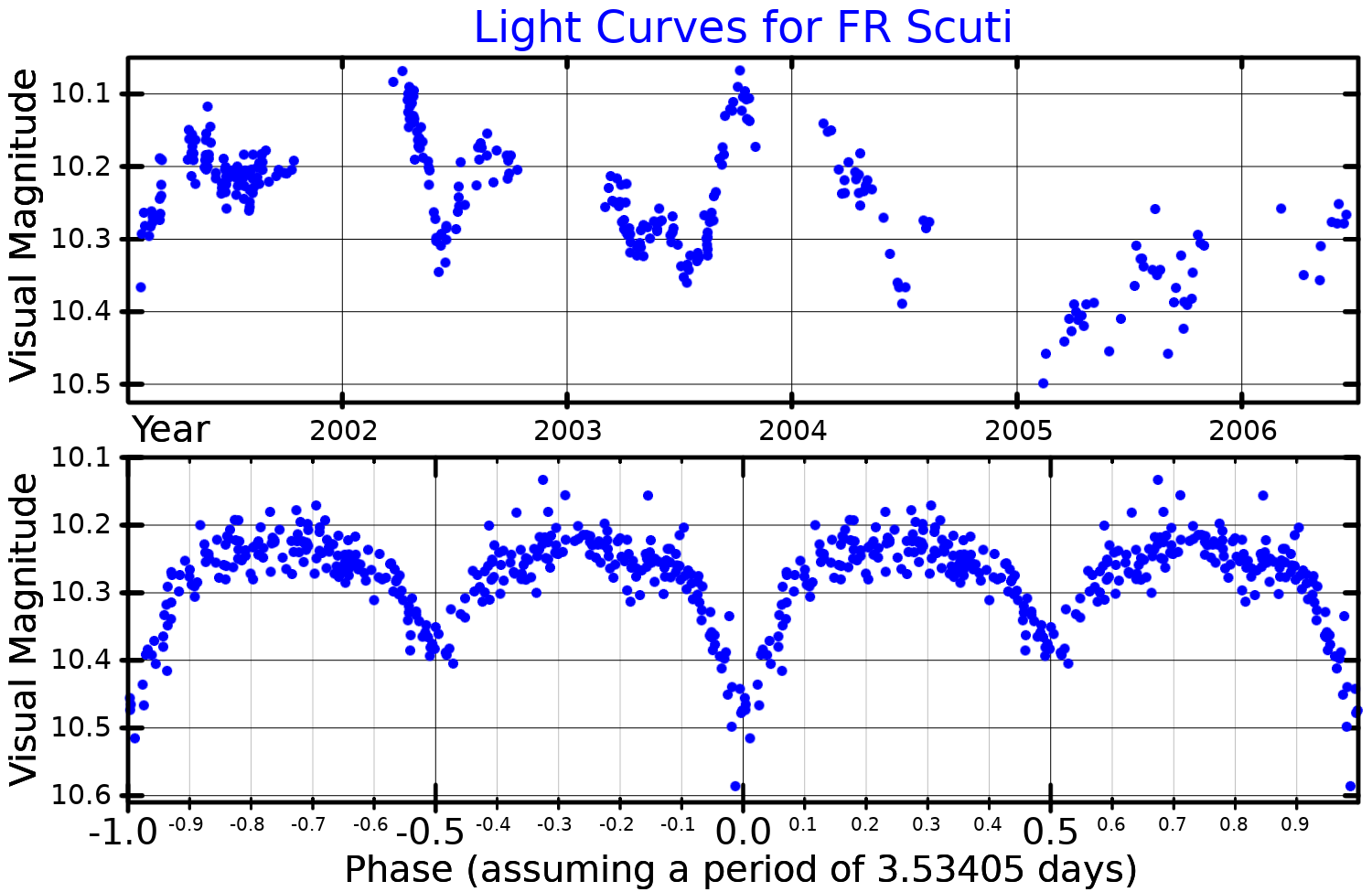
Visual band light curves for FR Scuti, adapted from Pigulski and Michalska (2007), are shown. The upper panel shows the long-term variability, with the effects of eclipses removed, and the lower panel shows the variability due to eclipses, with the effects of long-term variability removed.

The system consists of a cool red supergiant primary and a smaller hotter companion. The hot companion is itself a close binary, likely consisting of two massive B-type stars (inferred from the VV Cephei classification and emission lines). The two hot stars occupy an inner orbit, while the M supergiant has an wider orbit. This hierarchical structure makes it unique among VV Cephei systems, which are rare massive binaries related to, but distinct from, symbiotic stars. The system is also a radio source, likely due to thermal emission from plasma ionized by the hot components' ultraviolet radiation interacting with the M supergiant's wind.

== Spectral features ==
The spectrum is composite, showing emission lines typical of VV Cephei systems (hydrogen, [Fe II]), but uniquely includes stronger [Fe III] and [O III] lines, which may indicate hotter components or effects from the hot binary's duplicity. These features were first noted in 1956.
