= S Scuti =

Variable star in the constellation Scutum

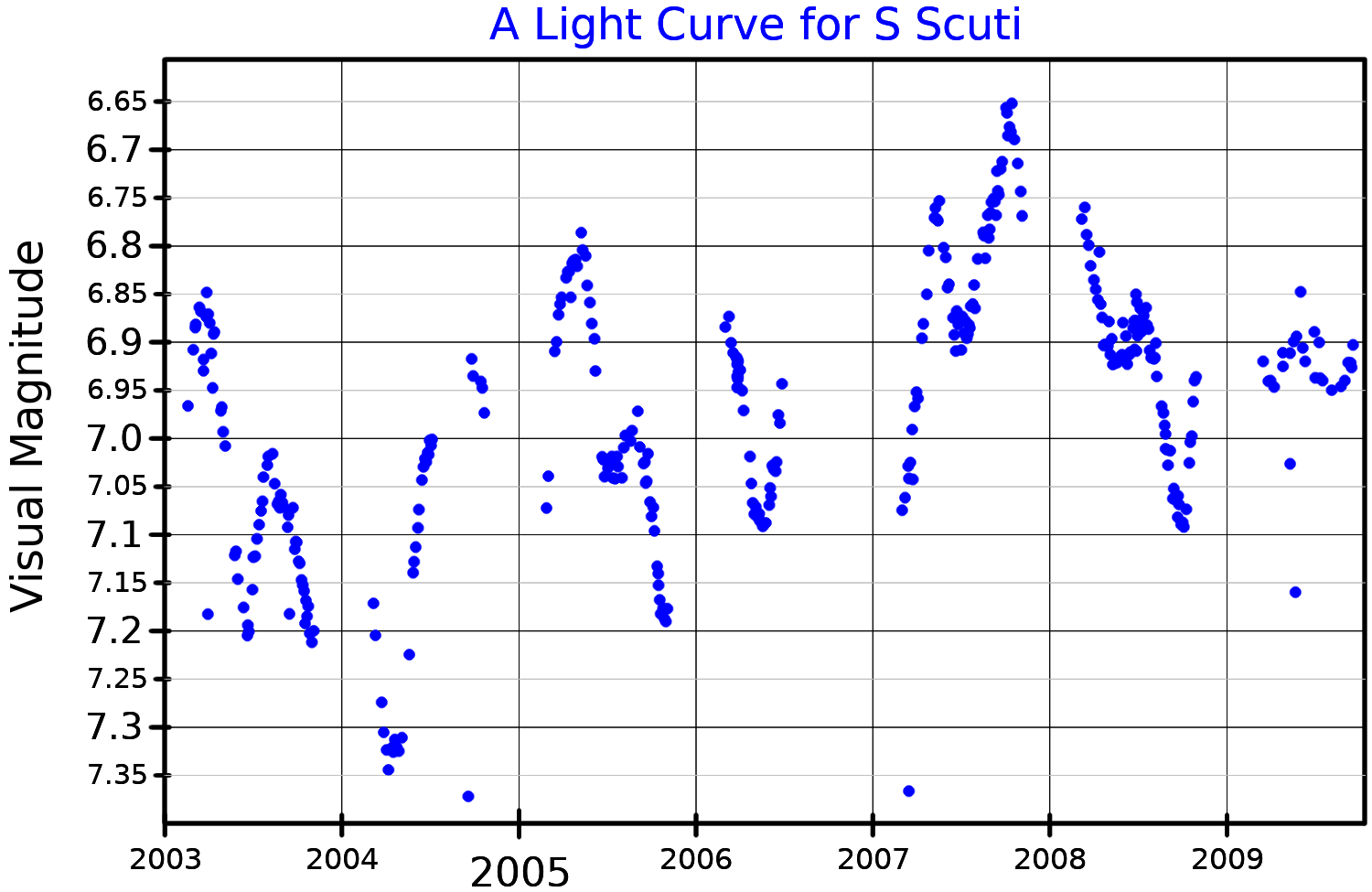
- A visual band light curve for S Scuti, plotted from ASAS data

Observation data Epoch J2000 Equinox ICRS
- Constellation: Scutum
- Right ascension: 18^{h} 50^{m} 20.03715^{s}
- Declination: −07° 54′ 27.4270″
- Apparent magnitude (V): 6.6 to 7.3

Characteristics
- Evolutionary stage: AGB
- Spectral type: C6_{4}
- Variable type: SRb

Astrometry
| Radial velocity (R_{v}) | −0.20±1.6 km/s |
| Proper motion (μ) | RA: 7.92 mas/yr Dec.: −4.55 mas/yr |
| Parallax (π) | 2.59±0.57 mas |
| Distance | approx. 1,300 ly (approx. 390 pc) |

Details
| Mass | 1.0 M_{☉} |
| Radius | 126 R_{☉} |
| Luminosity | 8,552 L_{☉} |
| Temperature | 3,000 K |

Other designations
- BD−08°4726, HD 174325, HIP 92442, HR 7089, SAO 142674

Database references
| SIMBAD | data |

S Scuti is a carbon star located in the constellation Scutum. Parallax measurements by Hipparcos put it at a distance of approximately 1,300 light-years (390 parsecs). Its apparent magnitude varies between 6.6 and 7.3, making it not quite bright enough to be seen with the naked eye.

Louisa Dennison Wells discovered that the star is a variable star. Her discovery was announced in 1901. It was listed with its variable star designation, S Scuti, in Annie Jump Cannon's 1907 work Second Catalog of Variable Stars. S Scuti is a semiregular variable star. Its class is SRb, and its pulsation cycle lasts 148 days. S Scuti is also surrounded by a roughly spherical shell of dust. The shell was known earlier from its carbon monoxide emission lines. The total mass of the dust is (7±2)×10^{−5} M_{☉}.
