= HD 201507 =

High proper motion star in the constellation Equuleus

- Location of HD 201507 (circled)

Observation data Epoch J2000.0 Equinox ICRS
- Constellation: Equuleus
- Right ascension: 21^{h} 09^{m} 58.2645^{s}
- Declination: +02° 56′ 37.310″
- Apparent magnitude (V): 6.43±0.01

Characteristics
- Evolutionary stage: subgiant
- Spectral type: F5 IV
- U−B color index: +0.06
- B−V color index: +0.37

Astrometry
Radial velocity (R_{v})	−42.8±2.4 km/s
Proper motion (μ)	RA: +48.902 mas/yr Dec.: +10.883 mas/yr
Parallax (π)	15.2530±0.3122 mas
Distance	214 ± 4 ly (66 ± 1 pc)
Absolute magnitude (M_{V})	+2.12

Details
Mass	1.45±0.23 M_{☉}
Radius	2.2±0.1 R_{☉}
Luminosity	9.147±0.21 L_{☉}
Surface gravity (log g)	3.91±0.09 cgs
Temperature	6,846±233 K
Metallicity [Fe/H]	+0.09 dex
Rotational velocity (v sin i)	16.4±10.6 km/s
Age	1.21 Gyr

Other designations
- 13 G. Equulei, AG+02°2701, BD+02°4311, GC 29582, HD 201507, HIP 104481, HR 8095, SAO 126587

Database references
SIMBAD	data

HD 201507, also designated HR 8095, is a white-hued star located in the equatorial constellation Equuleus. It has an apparent magnitude of 6.43, placing it near the limit for naked eye visibility. Parallax measurements place the object at a distance of 214 light years and it is currently drifting closer with a heliocentric radial velocity of −43 km/s.

There have been disagreements in classifying the star's spectrum. Eugene A. Harlan found a spectral classification of F5 IV, indicating that it is a F-type subgiant that is evolving towards the red giant branch. On the other hand, Nancy Houk and Carrie Swift (1999) found a class of F2 V, indicating that it is still on the main sequence.

HD 201507 has 1.45 times the mass of the Sun and a slightly enlarged radius of 2.2 R_{☉} due to its evolved state. It shines with a luminosity of about 9 L_{☉} from its photosphere at an effective temperature of 6,846 K. HD 201507 is slightly metal enriched, with a metallicity 123% that of the Sun. This star has a modest projected rotational velocity of 16 km/s and is estimated to be 1.21 billion years old, only a quarter the age of the Sun.
