= 1SWASP J093010.78+533859.5 =

Quintuple star system in the constellation Ursa Major

Observation data Epoch J2000 Equinox ICRS
- Constellation: Ursa Major
- A
- Right ascension: 09^{h} 30^{m} 10.7410^{s}
- Declination: +53° 38′ 59.825″
- Apparent magnitude (V): 9.84
- B
- Right ascension: 09^{h} 30^{m} 10.9127^{s}
- Declination: +53° 38′ 58.356″
- Apparent magnitude (V): 10.98

Characteristics

A
- Spectral type: K1V + K5V
- Variable type: Algol

B
- Spectral type: K3V + K3V
- Variable type: W UMa

Astrometry

A
Radial velocity (R_{v})	12.24±0.17 km/s
Distance	250±9.8 ly (78±3 pc)

B
Proper motion (μ)	RA: −0.737 mas/yr Dec.: −12.997 mas/yr
Parallax (π)	14.2625±0.0165 mas
Distance	228.7 ± 0.3 ly (70.11 ± 0.08 pc)

Orbit
Primary	Aa
Name	Ab
Period (P)	31.333 hours
Semi-major axis (a)	5.762±0.010 R_{☉}
Eccentricity (e)	0
Inclination (i)	88.2±0.3°

Orbit
Primary	Ba
Name	Bb
Period (P)	5.465 hours
Semi-major axis (a)	1.665±0.012 R_{☉}
Eccentricity (e)	0
Inclination (i)	86±4°

Details

J093010Aa
Mass	0.837±0.008 M_{☉}
Radius	0.832±0.018 R_{☉}
Surface gravity (log g)	4.52 cgs
Temperature	5,185+25 −20 K

J093010Ab
Mass	0.674±0.007 M_{☉}
Radius	0.669±0.018 R_{☉}
Surface gravity (log g)	4.62 cgs
Temperature	4,325+20 −15 K

J093010Ba
Mass	0.86±0.02 M_{☉}
Radius	0.79±0.04 R_{☉}
Luminosity	0.261±0.012 (Note: Calculated from absolute bolometric magnitude of 6.20±0.05 and 7.12±0.05 for J093010Ba and Bb, respectively, using the following formula: $$\frac{L_\star}{L_\odot} = 10^{0.4\left(M_\mathrm{bol,\odot} - M_\mathrm{bol,\star}\right)}$$ where L_{☉} is the Sun's bolometric luminosity, L_{★} is the star's bolometric luminosity, M_{bol,☉} is the bolometric magnitude of the Sun, M_{bol,★} is the bolometric magnitude of the star.) L_{☉}
Surface gravity (log g)	4.58 cgs
Temperature	4,700±50 K

J093010Bb
Mass	0.341±0.011 M_{☉}
Radius	0.52±0.05 R_{☉}
Luminosity	0.112±0.005 L_{☉}
Surface gravity (log g)	4.53 cgs
Temperature	4,700±50 K

Other designations
- RX J0930.1+5339, WDS J09302+5339 (Note: Simbad assigns the 1SWASP J093010.78+533859.5 designation to component B, but various sources make clear it applies to the whole "system" of four or five stars. Similarly, the designation 1SWASP J093012.84+533859.6 is also given to component B, but actually applies to an 18th-magnitude star 18" away.)
- A: V441 UMa, TYC 3807-759-1
- B: V442 UMa, TYC 3807-759-2

Database references
SIMBAD	data
- A
- B

1SWASP J093010.78+533859.5 (abbreviated as J093010), also known as V441 Ursae Majoris and V442 Ursae Majoris, is a quintuple star system located in the constellation Ursa Major. The star system is located approximately 250 light-years from Earth, and was discovered using data from the "Super Wide Angle Search for Planets" (SuperWASP) project in the Canary Islands.

== Description ==
1SWASP J093010.78+533859.5 consists of two pairs of stars, designated J093010A and J093010B respectively, as well as a fifth star. The first pair of stars, J093010A, is a detached eclipsing binary (an Algol variable). The two stars within J093010A orbit with a period of about 1.3 days and are separated by about 5.8 solar radii. The second pair of stars, J093010B is a W Ursae Majoris variable; in this pair the two stars are so close as to be touching each other. The two stars within J093010B take about 5.5 hours (0.2277 days) to orbit each other.

The two pairs J093010A and J093010B are separated by about 1.89 arcseconds, so the separation between the two pairs is likely about 130 astronomical units. The fifth star was detected based on stationary spectral lines coming from the direction of 1SWASP J093010.78+533859.5. The fifth star likely orbits J093010A at a further distance than the eclipsing binary.

== Variability ==
J093010A is a detached (Algol-type) eclipsing binary. Its magnitude drops from a maximum of 9.44 to a primary minimum of 9.75 and a secondary minimum of 9.58 every 1.31 days. It has been given the variable star designation V441 Ursae Majoris.

J093010B is a contact (W UMa-type) eclipsing binary. Its magnitude drops by 0.28 magnitudes at the primary eclipse and 0.25 magnitudes during the secondary eclipse from a maximum magnitude of 10.55. The period is 0.23 days. It has been given the variable star designation V442 Ursae Majoris.

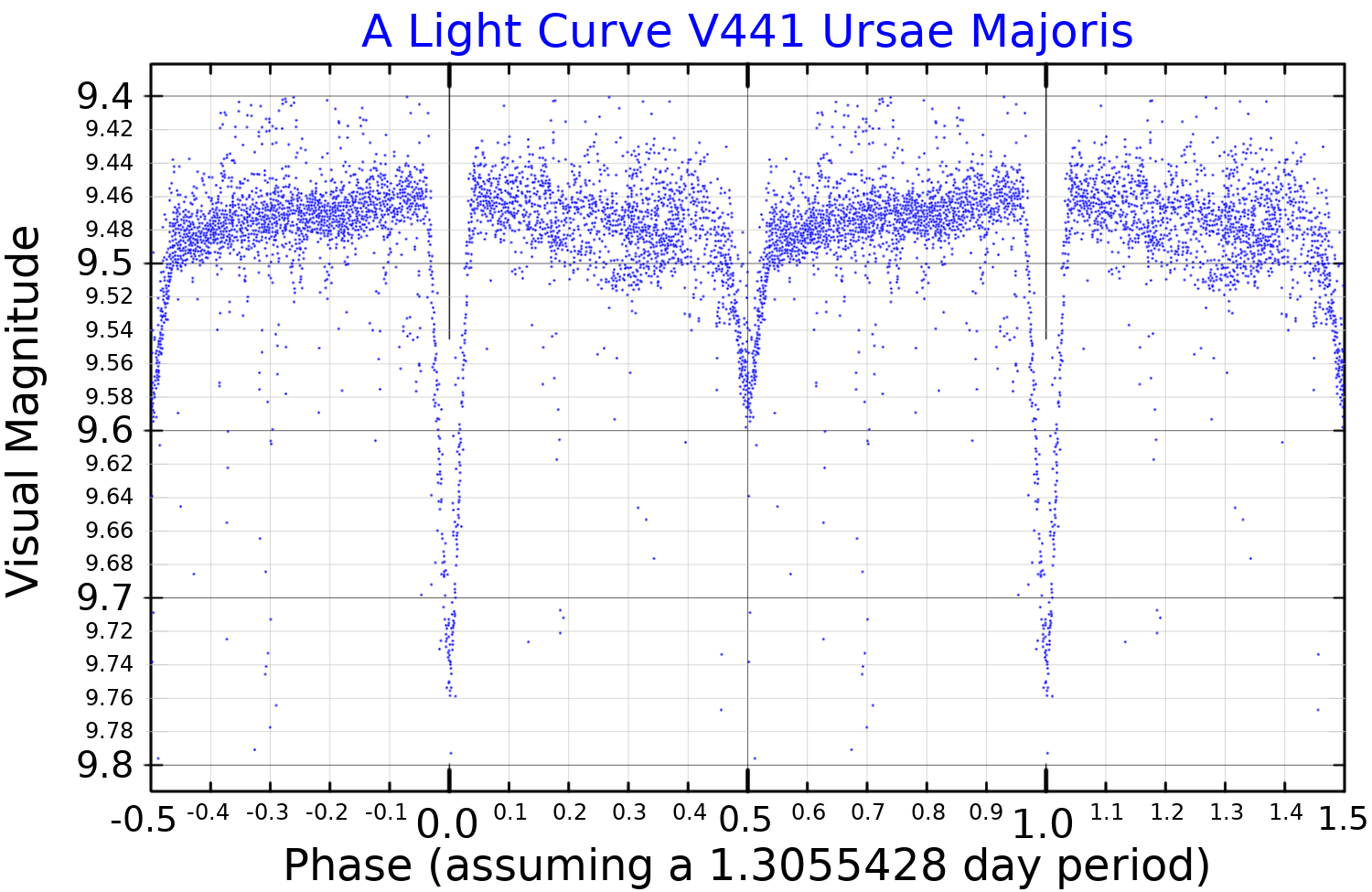
A light curve for V441 Ursae Majoris (J093010A), adapted from Lohr et al. (2015). The maximum brightness is the combined light of all 5 stars.

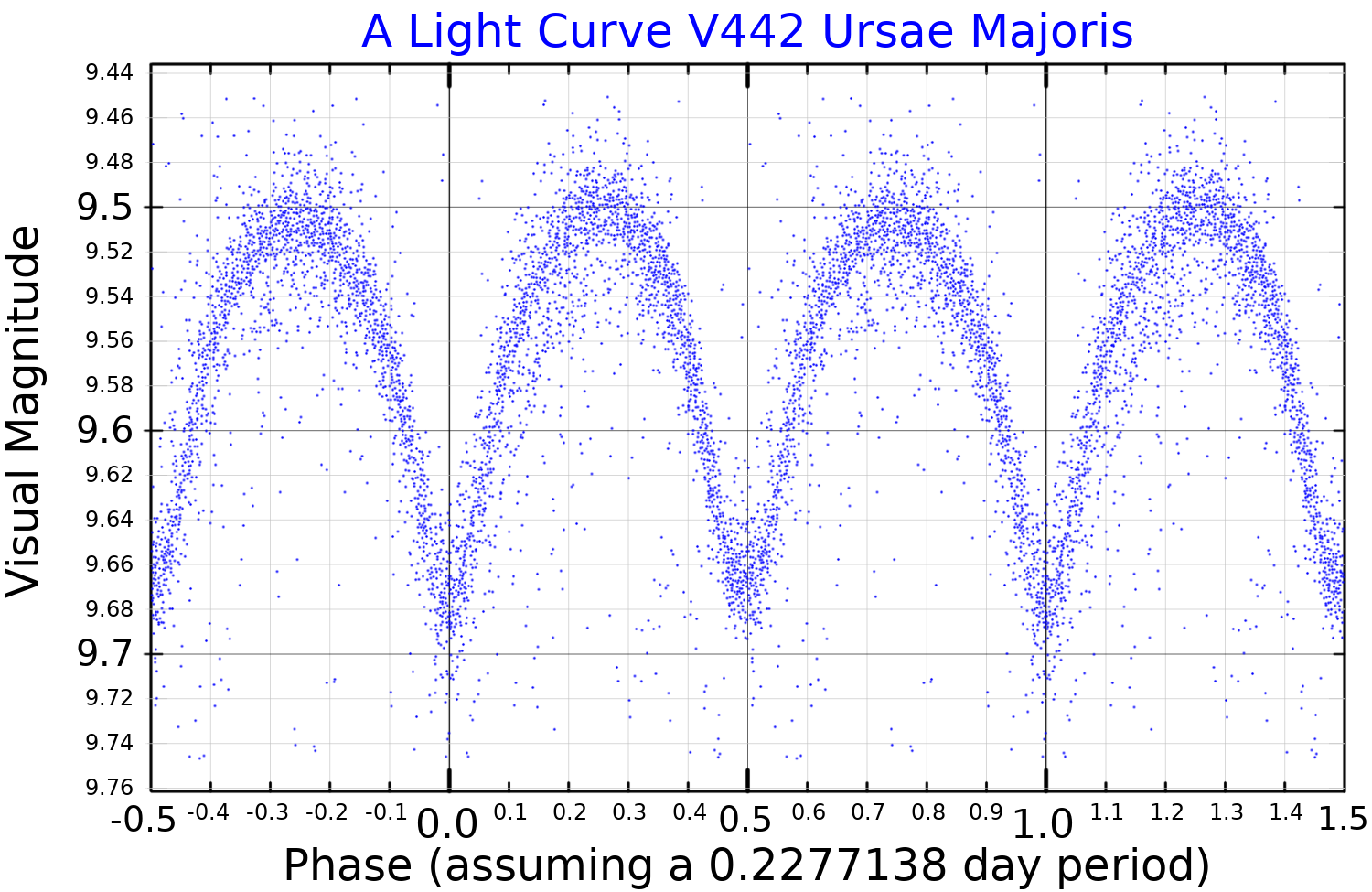
A light curve for V442 Ursae Majoris (J093010B), adapted from Lohr et al. (2015). The maximum brightness is the combined light of all 5 stars.

== See also ==
- V1400 Centauri
