= HD 82785 =

Star in the constellation Antlia

Observation data Epoch J2000 Equinox J2000
- Constellation: Antlia
- Right ascension: 09^{h} 33^{m} 07.68032^{s}
- Declination: −39° 07′ 44.6588″
- Apparent magnitude (V): 6.43

Characteristics
- Spectral type: F2IV/V
- B−V color index: +0.33

Astrometry
Radial velocity (R_{v})	27.76±0.48 km/s
Proper motion (μ)	RA: −41.698 mas/yr Dec.: 39.399 mas/yr
Parallax (π)	13.5932±0.0311 mas
Distance	239.9 ± 0.5 ly (73.6 ± 0.2 pc)
Absolute magnitude (M_{V})	2.06

Details
Mass	1.68 M_{☉}
Radius	2.43+0.04 −0.11 R_{☉}
Luminosity	11.718+0.043 −0.042 L_{☉}
Surface gravity (log g)	3.88 cgs
Temperature	6,869 K
Metallicity [Fe/H]	–0.06 dex
Rotational velocity (v sin i)	36 km/s
Age	1.50 Gyr

Other designations
- CD−38°5676, HD 82785, HIP 46874, HR 3812, SAO 200492, WDS J09331-3908A

Database references
SIMBAD	data

HD 82785 is star in the southern constellation of Antlia. With an apparent visual magnitude of 6.43, it is near the lower limit of visibility to the naked eye. The distance to this star, based on parallax measurements, is 240 light years. It is drifting further away from the Sun with a radial velocity of 28 km/s, having come to within 142 light-years some 1.7 million years ago. It has an absolute magnitude of 2.06.

This F-type star has a stellar classification of F2IV/V, displaying a blended luminosity class of a main sequence star combined to a more evolved subgiant star. It is 1.5 billion years old and is spinning with a projected rotational velocity of 36 km/s. The star has 1.68 times the mass and 2.43 times the radius of the Sun. HD 82785 is radiating 11.7 times the luminosity of the Sun from its photosphere at an effective temperature of 6,869 K.

There is a magnitude 9.21 star positioned at an angular separation of 56.0″ along a position angle of 205° from the brighter component, as of 2016. This companion was first reported by W. S. Jacob in 1847.
