= HD 128717 =

F-type star in the constellation Draco

Observation data Epoch J2000 Equinox J2000
- Constellation: Draco
- Right ascension: 14^{h} 36^{m} 21.3187^{s}
- Declination: +57° 33′ 38.382″
- Apparent magnitude (V): 8.29±0.01

Characteristics
- Evolutionary stage: main sequence
- Spectral type: F8

Astrometry
| Radial velocity (R_{v}) | −4.851±0.004 km/s |
| Proper motion (μ) | RA: −82.125 mas/yr Dec.: +67.259 mas/yr |
| Parallax (π) | 13.5609±0.0216 mas |
| Distance | 240.5 ± 0.4 ly (73.7 ± 0.1 pc) |
| Absolute magnitude (M_{V}) | 4.16 |

Orbit
| Period (P) | 9.37+0.06 −0.05 years |
| Semi-major axis (a) | 4.85+0.02 −0.01 au |
| Eccentricity (e) | 0.850±0.002 |
| Inclination (i) | 130.3+1.6 −1.9° |
| Longitude of the node (Ω) | 131.7+3.3 −3.4° |
| Periastron epoch (T) | 2023.6716±0.0009 |
| Argument of periastron (ω) (secondary) | −105.7+0.4 −0.3° |

Details

A
| Mass | 1.212+0.058 −0.068 M_{☉} |
| Radius | 1.248±0.024 R_{☉} |
| Luminosity | 2.10±0.07 L_{☉} |
| Surface gravity (log g) | 4.329+0.025 −0.030 cgs |
| Temperature | 6,210±40 K |
| Metallicity [Fe/H] | +0.16±0.08 dex |
| Rotation | 7.8±0.6 days |
| Rotational velocity (v sin i) | 6.1±0.5 km/s |
| Age | 1.4±0.3 Gyr |

B
| Mass | 19.8±0.5 M_{Jup} |

Other designations
- BD+58°1514, HD 128717, HIP 71425, TYC 3866-1234-1

Database references
| SIMBAD | data |

HD 128717 is a star in the constellation of Draco. With an apparent magnitude of +8.29, it is too faint to be seen with the naked eye. Parallax measurements by the Gaia spacecraft imply a distance of 240 light-years (73.7 parsecs). It is moving towards the Solar System at a velocity of 4.851 km/s.

== Characteristics ==
With a spectral class of F8, HD 128717 is a late-type F-type star. It is estimated to be 1.4 billion years old, has 1.21 times the mass of the Sun and 1.25 times the radius. It radiates 2.1 times the Sun's luminosity from its photosphere at an effective temperature of 6,210 K, giving it the typical yellowish-white hue of a late-type F-type star.

The space velocity components of HD 128717 are U =−30, V=−10 and W=−4km/s. It is orbiting the Milky Way galaxy with an orbital eccentricity of 0.06. Its distance from the Galactic Center varies between 7.40 kiloparsecs (24.1 kilolight-years) and 8.38 kpc (27.3 kly). This orbit lies close to the galactic plane, and the star travels no more than 70 parsecs (230 light-years) above or below this plane.

== Companion ==
Astrometric data collected by the Gaia spacecraft on its third data release revealed that HD 128717 appears to wobble around an empty space, indicating that it has an object in orbit whose gravitational force is pulling it. The object was first noted by the Gaia team in 2022, and the paper by Sahlmann et al in 2024 identified HD 128717 "as a strong candidate for hosting a super-Jupiter". In the same year, Alessandro Sozzetti reported, in a conference, the confirmation of the object using radial velocity observations. The companion was independently confirmed by Pinamonti et al. (2025), which named it as Gaia-6b since it was the sixth planetary candidate detected by Gaia that has been later confirmed.

HD 128717 b is a brown dwarf with 19.8 times the mass of Jupiter. It has an orbital period of 9.37 years and a highly-eccentric orbit: At apoastron, its orbital separation is 9.0 astronomical units, while at periastron it is 0.73 au. (Note: Calculating using the equations a(1 + e) and a(1 − e) for apoastron and periastron, respectively, where a is the semi-major axis and e is the eccentricity.) The reasons for such a high eccentricity remain unclear.
