= Gamma Scuti =

Star in the constellation Scutum

γ Scuti
- Location of γ Scuti (circled)

Observation data Epoch J2000 Equinox ICRS
- Constellation: Scutum
- Right ascension: 18^{h} 29^{m} 11.85388^{s}
- Declination: −14° 33′ 56.9319″
- Apparent magnitude (V): 4.67

Characteristics
- Spectral type: A2:V
- U−B color index: +0.04
- B−V color index: +0.07

Astrometry
Radial velocity (R_{v})	-41.00 km/s
Proper motion (μ)	RA: +3.22 mas/yr Dec.: −4.02 mas/yr
Parallax (π)	10.21±0.24 mas
Distance	319 ± 8 ly (98 ± 2 pc)
Absolute magnitude (M_{V})	−0.28

Details
Mass	2.91 M_{☉}
Radius	4.1 R_{☉}
Luminosity	150 L_{☉}
Surface gravity (log g)	2.09 cgs
Temperature	9,016 K
Rotational velocity (v sin i)	222 km/s
Age	237 Myr

Other designations
- γ Sct, BD−14°5071, FK5 696, GC 25220, HD 170296, HIP 90595, HR 6930, SAO 161520, GSC 05702-02882

Database references
SIMBAD	data

Gamma Scuti, Latinized from γ Scuti, is a single, white-hued star in the southern constellation of Scutum. The apparent visual magnitude of 4.67 indicates this is a dim star but visible to the naked eye. Based upon an annual parallax shift of 10.21 mas as seen from Earth, this star is located about 319 light years from the Sun. Currently it is moving towards the Solar System at 41 km/s, which means in 2.35 million years it will pass at just 20 ly (5.519 pc) distance, probably becoming the brightest star in the night sky, at magnitude −2.1, for a period.

This is an A-type main-sequence star with a stellar classification of A2:V. At the age of 237 million years, it is spinning rapidly with a projected rotational velocity of 222 km/s. This is giving the star an oblate shape with a prominent equatorial bulge that is estimated to be 21% larger than the polar radius. The star has an estimated 2.91 times the mass of the Sun and 4.1 times the Sun's radius. It is radiating 150 times the Sun's luminosity from its photosphere at an effective temperature of 9,016 K.
