= Zeta Scuti =

Star in the constellation Scutum

ζ Scuti
- Location of ζ Scuti (circled)

Observation data Epoch J2000 Equinox ICRS
- Constellation: Scutum
- Right ascension: 18^{h} 23^{m} 39.58309^{s}
- Declination: −08° 56′ 03.7885″
- Apparent magnitude (V): 4.66

Characteristics
- Spectral type: G9 IIIb Fe-0.5
- U−B color index: +0.72
- B−V color index: +0.94

Astrometry
Radial velocity (R_{v})	−5.02 km/s
Proper motion (μ)	RA: +49.59 mas/yr Dec.: +51.24 mas/yr
Parallax (π)	15.78±1.02 mas
Distance	210 ± 10 ly (63 ± 4 pc)
Absolute magnitude (M_{V})	0.66

Orbit
Primary	ζ Scuti A
Name	ζ Scuti B
Period (P)	2373.7 days
Semi-major axis (a)	21.6 mas
Eccentricity (e)	0.1
Inclination (i)	89°
Longitude of the node (Ω)	226°
Periastron epoch (T)	2418278.3
Argument of periastron (ω) (secondary)	242.1°

Details
Mass	1.29 M_{☉}
Radius	9.3 R_{☉}
Luminosity	62.04 L_{☉}
Surface gravity (log g)	2.61 cgs
Temperature	4,750 K
Metallicity [Fe/H]	−0.08 dex
Rotational velocity (v sin i)	1.5 km/s

Other designations
- ζ Sct, BD−09°4712, GC 25101, HD 169156, HIP 90135, HR 6884, SAO 142267, GSC 05690-01263

Database references
SIMBAD	data

Zeta Scuti, Latinized from ζ Scuti, is the Bayer designation for a star in the southern constellation of Scutum. It is a faint star but visible to the naked eye with an apparent magnitude of 4.66. The distance to this star, as determined via parallax measurement, is around 210 light years. It is moving closer to the Sun with a radial velocity of −5 km/s.

This is an astrometric binary system with a period of 6.5 years (2,374 days) and an orbital eccentricity of 0.10. The visible component is an aging giant star of type G with a stellar classification of G9 IIIb Fe−0.5. The suffix notation indicates the spectrum displays a mild underabundance of iron. It has 1.29 times the mass of the Sun and has expanded to 9.3 times the Sun's radius. The star is radiating 62 times the Sun's luminosity from its enlarged photosphere at an effective temperature of 4,750 K.
