= GD 40 =

Star in the constellation Cetus

Observation data Epoch J2000.0 Equinox ICRS
- Constellation: Cetus
- Right ascension: 03^{h} 02^{m} 53.10375^{s}
- Declination: −01° 08′ 33.7987″
- Apparent magnitude (V): 15.56

Characteristics
- Evolutionary stage: white dwarf
- Spectral type: DB

Astrometry
Parallax (π)	15.3618±0.0456 mas
Distance	212.3 ± 0.6 ly (65.1 ± 0.2 pc)
Absolute magnitude (M_{V})	11.30

Details
Mass	0.54 M_{☉}
Radius	0.014±0.003 (Note: Derived from known mass and gravity of star; radius is consistent with known luminosity and temperature within 0.4%.) R_{☉}
Luminosity	0.0068 L_{☉}
Surface gravity (log g)	7.91±0.18 cgs
Temperature	14,280±298 K
Age	200 (Note: Cooling age) Myr

Other designations
- GD 40, EGGR 384, US 3562, WD 0300-013

Database references
SIMBAD	data

GD 40 is a white dwarf in the constellation Cetus. It is located about 212 light-years (65 parsecs) away from the Sun. The star's spectrum has been found to show traces of external metal contamination due to disruption of an extrasolar dwarf planet or an asteroid. The disrupted object should have had at least the same mass as the asteroid 4 Vesta.

== See also ==
- ZZ Piscium
- GD 61, white dwarf with an observed asteroid
