= 14 Aquilae =

Star in the constellation Aquila

Observation data Epoch J2000 Equinox ICRS
- Constellation: Aquila
- Right ascension: 19^{h} 02^{m} 54.50105^{s}
- Declination: −03° 41′ 56.2881″
- Apparent magnitude (V): 5.42

Characteristics
- Evolutionary stage: main sequence
- Spectral type: A1 V
- U−B color index: –0.07
- B−V color index: +0.00

Astrometry
Radial velocity (R_{v})	−39.0±3.7 km/s
Proper motion (μ)	RA: +15.558 mas/yr Dec.: +2.571 mas/yr
Parallax (π)	5.4932±0.2368 mas
Distance	590 ± 30 ly (182 ± 8 pc)
Absolute magnitude (M_{V})	−0.52

Details
Mass	3.25±0.05 M_{☉}
Radius	2.0 R_{☉}
Luminosity	213.9+23.8 −21.4 L_{☉}
Temperature	9,908+46 −45 K
Rotational velocity (v sin i)	23 km/s

Other designations
- 14 Aql, BD−03°4460, HD 176984, HIP 93526, HR 7209, SAO 142959, WDS J19029-0342

Database references
SIMBAD	data

14 Aquilae is a probable spectroscopic binary star system in the equatorial constellation of Aquila. 14 Aquilae is the Flamsteed designation though it also bears the Bayer designation g Aquilae. It is visible to the naked eye as a dim, white-hued star with an apparent visual magnitude of 5.42, and it is located at a distance of approximately 500 light-years (150 parsecs) from Sun. The star is moving closer to the Earth with a heliocentric radial velocity of −39 km/s, and may come as close as 136 light-years in around 3.5 million years.

The visible component is an A-type main sequence star with a stellar classification of A1 V. It has 3.25 times the mass of the Sun and about twice the Sun's radius. The projected rotational velocity is relatively low at 23 km/s. The star is radiating 214 times the luminosity of the Sun from its photosphere at an effective temperature of 9,908 K.
