= Wild Duck Cluster =

Open cluster in the constellation Scutum

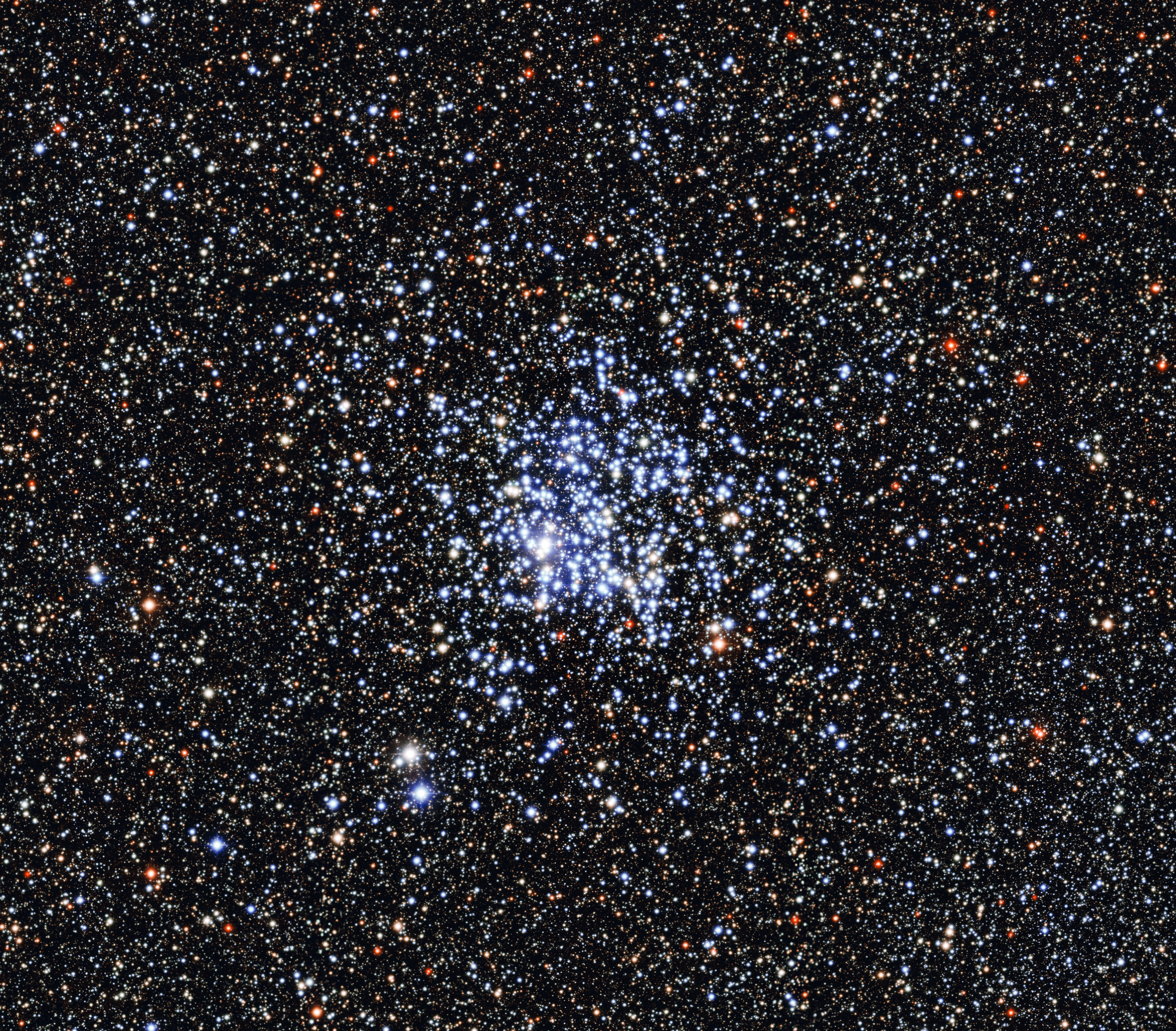
- Open cluster Messier 11 in Scutum

Observation data (J2000.0 epoch)
- Right ascension: 18^{h} 51^{m} 05.0^{s}
- Declination: −06° 16′ 12″
- Distance: 6,120 light-years (1,877 pc)
- Apparent magnitude (V): 5.8
- Apparent dimensions (V): 22.8′

Physical characteristics
- Mass: 11,000 M_{☉}
- Radius: 95 ly
- Estimated age: 316±50 million years
- Other designations: Messier 11, NGC 6705, Cr 391, Mel 213, OCl 76.0

Associations
- Constellation: Scutum

The Wild Duck Cluster (also known as Messier 11, or NGC 6705) is an open cluster of stars in the constellation Scutum (the Shield). It was discovered by Gottfried Kirch in 1681. Charles Messier included it in his catalogue of diffuse objects in 1764. Its popular name derives from the brighter stars forming a triangle which could resemble a flying flock of ducks (or, from other angles, one swimming duck). The cluster is located just to the east of the Scutum Star Cloud midpoint.

The Wild Duck Cluster is one of the richest and most compact of the known open clusters. It is one of the most massive open clusters known, and it has been extensively studied. Its age has been estimated to about 316 million years. The core radius is 1.23 pc (4.0 ly) while the tidal radius is 29 pc (95 ly). Estimates for the cluster's mass range from 3,700 M_{☉} to 11,000 M_{☉}, depending on the method chosen. The brightest cluster member is visual magnitude 8, and it has 870 members of at least magnitude 16.5. It has an integrated absolute magnitude of –6.5, and a visual extinction of 1.3.

The cluster is metal-rich with an iron abundance of [Fe/H] = 0.17±0.04. Despite its youth, it shows an enhancement of alpha process elements. Possibly this is due to an enhancement of its birth molecular cloud by a nearby Type II supernova explosion. At least nine variable star members have been identified with high probability, plus 29 lower probability members. The former include two eclipsing binary star systems. The cluster is located 6.8 kpc (22,000 ly) from the Galactic Center, close to the galactic plane, and is not far from its birthplace.

== Gallery ==
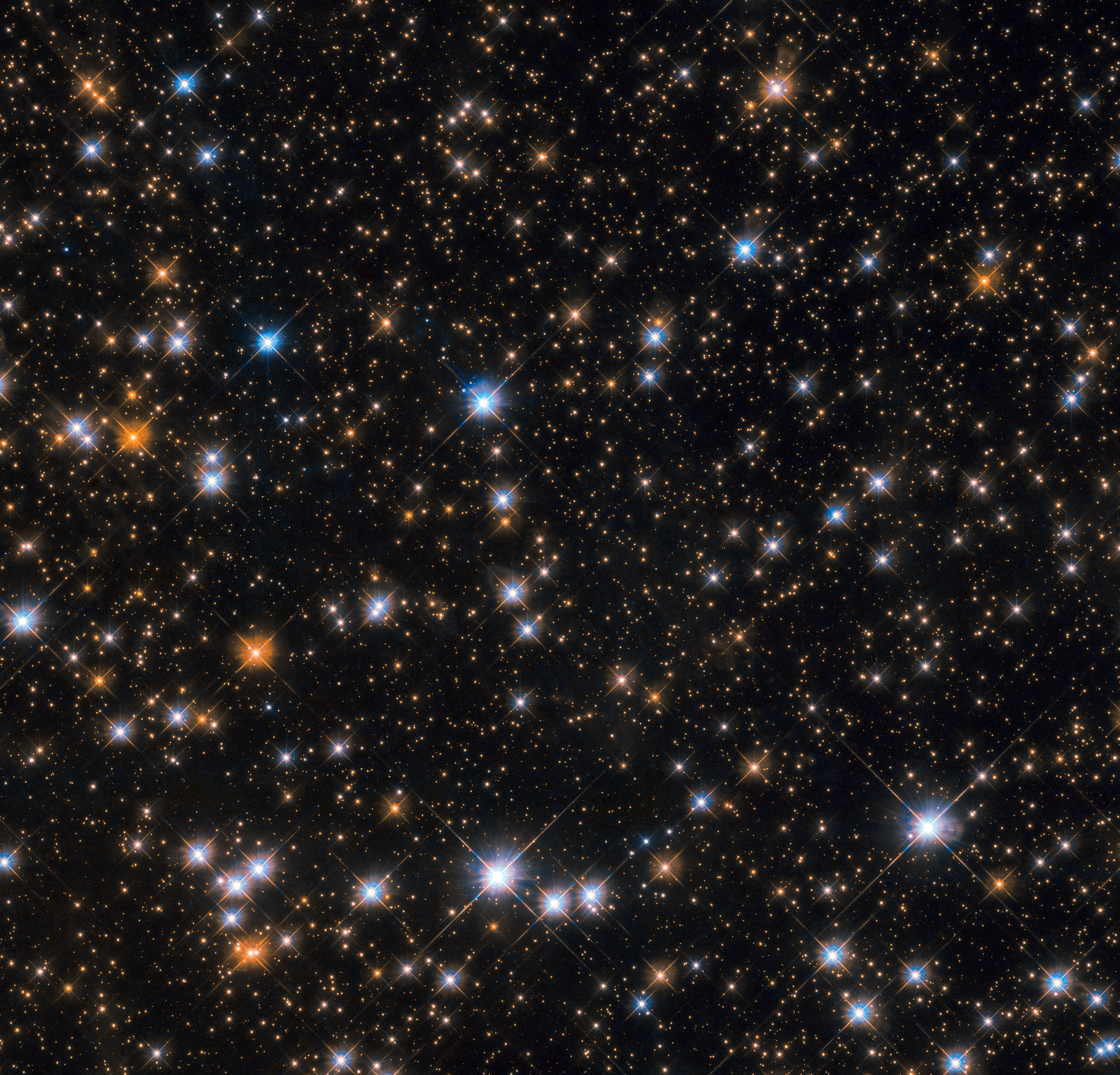
A portion of M11, imaged by the Hubble Space Telescope

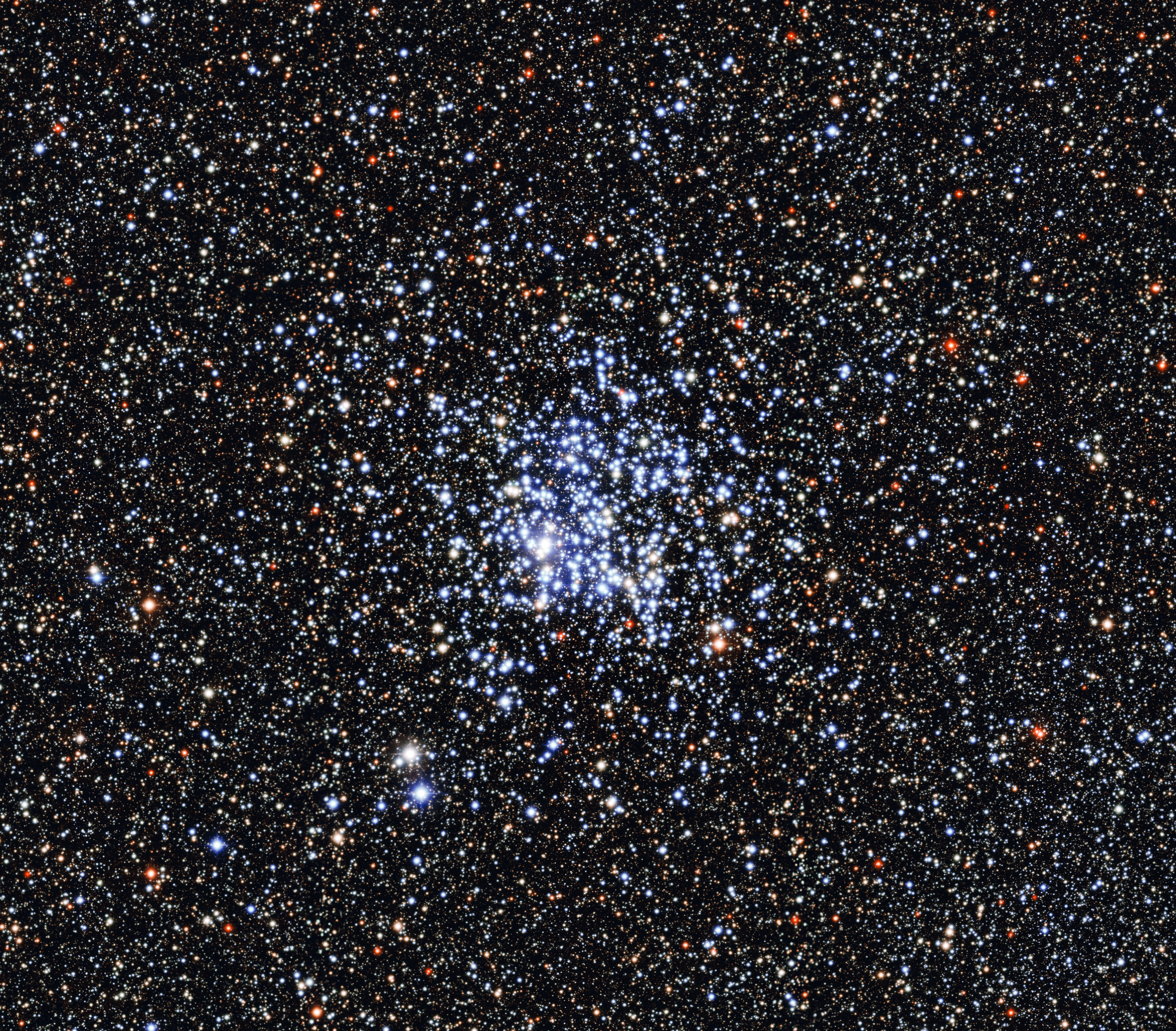
The blue stars in the centre of the image are the young, hot stars of the cluster.

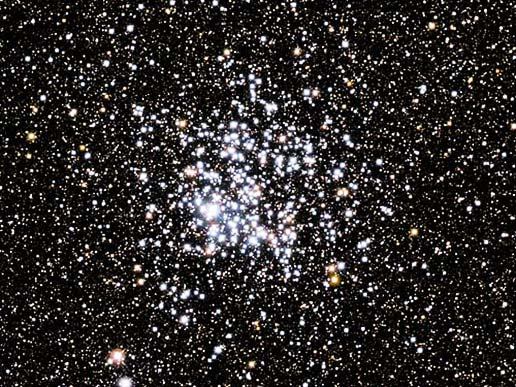
M11 is visible with binoculars in the constellation of Scutum.

== See also ==
- List of Messier objects
