= Epsilon Scuti =

Star in the constellation Scutum

ε Scuti
- Location of ε Scuti (circled)

Observation data Epoch J2000 Equinox ICRS
- Constellation: Scutum
- Right ascension: 18^{h} 43^{m} 31.251^{s}
- Declination: −08° 16′ 30.77″
- Apparent magnitude (V): 4.88

Characteristics
- Spectral type: G8IIb
- U−B color index: +0.88
- B−V color index: +1.12

Astrometry
Radial velocity (R_{v})	−9.8±0.6 km/s
Proper motion (μ)	RA: +21.781 mas/yr Dec.: +4,591 mas/yr
Parallax (π)	5.7100±0.1842 mas
Distance	570 ± 20 ly (175 ± 6 pc)
Absolute magnitude (M_{V})	−1.18

Details
Luminosity	403 L_{☉}
Surface gravity (log g)	1.00 cgs
Temperature	4,500 K
Metallicity [Fe/H]	+0.05 dex
Rotational velocity (v sin i)	5.1 km/s

Other designations
- ε Sct, 3 Aquilae, BD−08°4686, FK5 702, GC 25610, HD 173009, HIP 91845, HR 7032, SAO 142546, ADS 11601, CCDM J18435-0817A, WDS J18435-0817A, GSC 05692-02504

Database references
SIMBAD	data

Epsilon Scuti, Latinized from ε Scuti, is a probable astrometric binary star system in the constellation Scutum. It is faintly visible to the naked eye with an apparent visual magnitude of +4.88. Based upon an annual parallax shift of 5.71 mas as seen from Earth,> it is located approximately 570 light years from the Sun. It is moving closer to the Sun with a radial velocity of −9.8 km/s. Epsilon Scuti was a latter designation of 3 Aquilae.

The visible component is a yellow-hued bright giant with a G-type bright giant It is radiating 403 times the Sun's luminosity from its photosphere at an effective temperature of 4,500 K. Epsilon Scuti has at least three faint visual companions, two 14th magnitude stars, B and D, separated from the primary by 13.6 and 15.4 arcseconds respectively, and the 13th magnitude C, which is 38 arcseconds away.
