= Beta Scuti =

Star in the constellation Scutum

β Scuti
- Location of β Scuti (circled)

Observation data Epoch J2000 Equinox J2000
- Constellation: Scutum
- Right ascension: 18^{h} 47^{m} 10.474^{s}
- Declination: −04° 44′ 52.34″
- Apparent magnitude (V): 4.22

Characteristics
- Evolutionary stage: Giant star
- Spectral type: G4IIa
- U−B color index: +0.84
- B−V color index: +1.09

Astrometry
| Radial velocity (R_{v}) | −28.75±4.88 km/s |
| Proper motion (μ) | RA: −7.972 mas/yr Dec.: −16.398 mas/yr |
| Parallax (π) | 4.8549±0.3403 mas |
| Distance | 670 ± 50 ly (210 ± 10 pc) |
| Absolute magnitude (M_{V}) | −2.99 |

Orbit
| Period (P) | 834 days |
| Semi-major axis (a) | 2.8 mas |
| Eccentricity (e) | 0.350 |
| Inclination (i) | 105.9° |
| Longitude of the node (Ω) | 288.1° |
| Periastron epoch (T) | 2422480.9 |
| Argument of periastron (ω) (secondary) | 33.9° |

Details
| Radius | 49.26+3.24 −3.72 R_{☉} |
| Luminosity | 1,315±186 L_{☉} |
| Surface gravity (log g) | 0.94 cgs |
| Temperature | 4,951±25 K |
| Metallicity [Fe/H] | -0.16 dex |
| Rotational velocity (v sin i) | 7.8 km/s |

Other designations
- β Sct, BD−04°4582, FK5 1489, GC 25730, GSC 05122-01426, HIP 92175, HR 7063, HD 173764, SAO 142618, CCDM 18472-0445

Database references
| SIMBAD | data |

Beta Scuti, Latinized from β Scuti, is a binary star system in the southern constellation Scutum. Based upon an annual parallax shift of 4.85 mas as seen from Earth, it is located approximately 670 light years from the Sun.

== Characteristics ==
This is a spectroscopic binary with an orbital period of 2.3 years and eccentricity around 0.35. The secondary is about 3.3 magnitudes dimmer than the primary and estimated as type B9 based on the flux of far-ultraviolet radiation.

The primary component has an apparent visual magnitude of +4.22 and is radiating about 1,315 times the luminosity of the Sun from its outer atmosphere at an effective temperature of 4,951 K. This yellow-hued star is a G-type bright giant with a stellar classification of G4 IIa. Its angular diameter was measured at 2.121 milliarcseconds by the Navy Precision Optical Interferometer, which gives it a physical radius of approximately 49 R_{☉} at the estimated distance.

The secondary was directly detected with a magnitude difference of 3.6 at a separation of about 17 milli-arcseconds using observations from the Navy Precision Optical Interferometer. This detection was significant as observations with the Hubble Space Telescope which indicated a companion star was present were not definitive. With an orbit and a parallax the sum of the masses of the two stars can be determined via a dynamical parallax. This eventually can yield a precise mass for the evolved giant primary star.

Beta Scuti was a latter designation of 6 Aquilae.
