= Delta Scuti =

Star in the constellation Scutum

δ Scuti
- Location of Delta Scuti (circled).

Observation data Epoch J2000 Equinox J2000
- Constellation: Scutum
- Right ascension: 18^{h} 42^{m} 16.42690^{s}
- Declination: −09° 03′ 09.1889″
- Apparent magnitude (V): 4.60 - 4.79

Characteristics
- Spectral type: F2 IIIp
- U−B color index: +0.16
- B−V color index: +0.35
- Variable type: δ Sct

Astrometry
Radial velocity (R_{v})	−42.83±1.21 km/s
Proper motion (μ)	RA: +7.3 mas/yr Dec.: +1.212 mas/yr
Parallax (π)	16.1899±0.1157 mas
Distance	201 ± 1 ly (61.8 ± 0.4 pc)
Absolute magnitude (M_{V})	0.72±0.04

Details
Mass	1.97–2.27 M_{☉}
Radius	4.07–4.25 R_{☉}
Luminosity	36.3–38.7 L_{☉}
Surface gravity (log g)	3.5 cgs
Temperature	7,000 K
Metallicity [Fe/H]	0.41 dex
Rotational velocity (v sin i)	25.5 km/s
Age	1.03–1.09 Gyr

Other designations
- δ Sct, 2 Aql, BD−09°4796, FK5 1486, HD 172748, HIP 91726, HR 7020, SAO 142515

Database references
SIMBAD	data

Delta Scuti, Latinized from δ Scuti, is a variable star in the southern constellation Scutum. With an apparent visual magnitude that fluctuates around 4.72, it is the fifth-brightest star in this small and otherwise undistinguished constellation. Analysis of the parallax measurements place this star at a distance of about 200 light-years (61 parsecs) from Earth. It is drifting closer with a radial velocity of −43 km/s.

== Variability ==
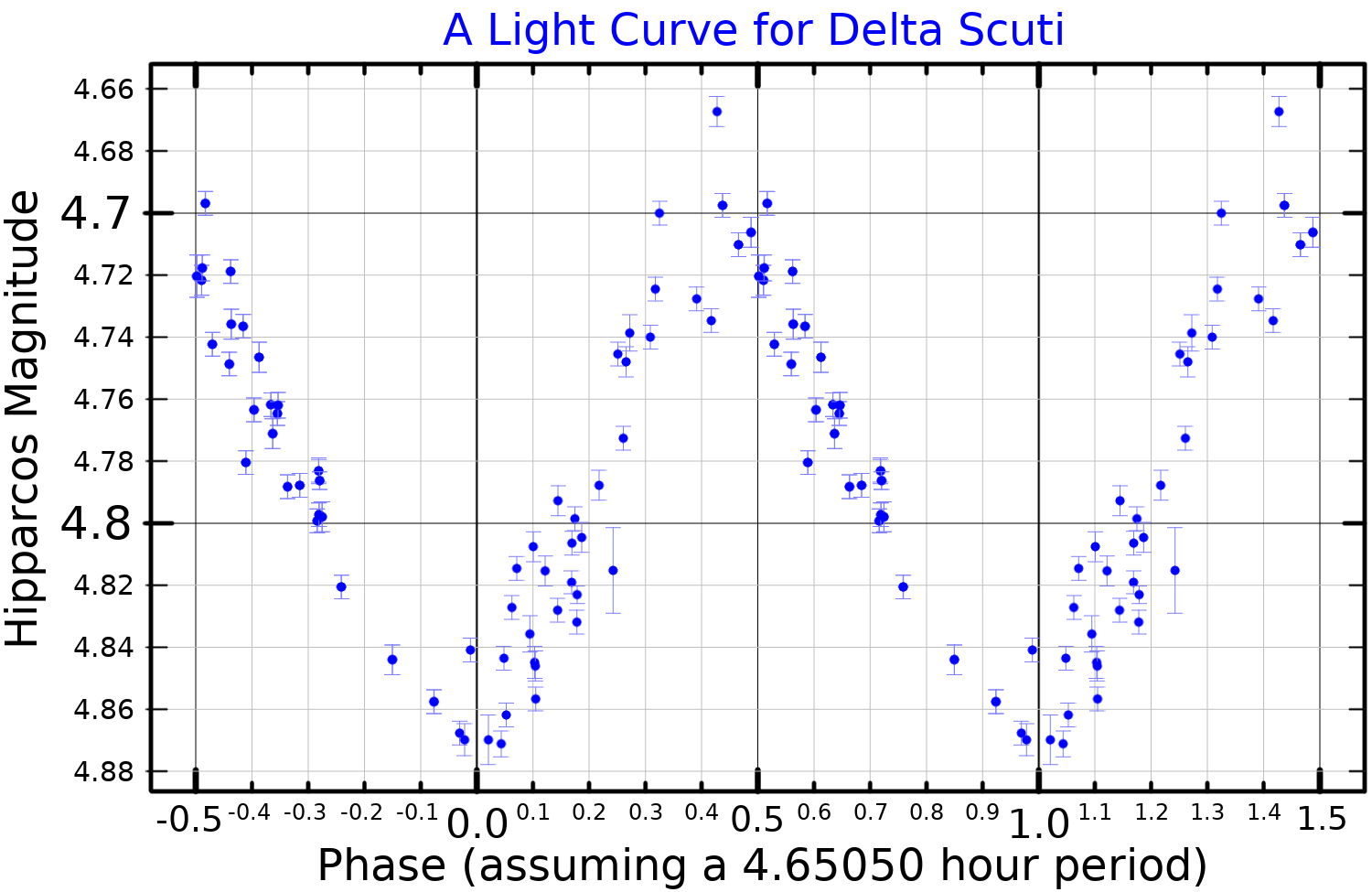
A light curve for Delta Scuti, plotted from Hipparcos data

In 1900, William W. Campbell and William H. Wright used the Mills spectrograph at the Lick Observatory to determine that this star has a variable radial velocity. The 0.19377 days (4.650 h) period of this variability as well as 0.2 magnitude changes in luminosity demonstrated in 1935 that the variability was intrinsic, rather than being the result of a spectroscopic binary. In 1938, a secondary period was discovered and a pulsation theory was proposed to model the variation. Since then, observation of Delta Scuti has shown that it pulsates in multiple discrete radial and non-radial modes. The strongest mode has a frequency of 59.731 μHz, the next strongest has a frequency of 61.936 μHz, and so forth, with a total of eight different frequency modes now modeled.

Delta Scuti is the prototype of the Delta Scuti type variable stars. It is a high-amplitude δ Scuti type pulsator with light variations of about 0.19 magnitudes (V). The peculiar chemical abundances of this star are similar to those of Am stars. It has a stellar classification of F2 IIIp, matching an F-type giant star. Delta Scuti has two times the mass and between 4.07 and 4.25 times the radius of the Sun. It is approximately one billion year old and is spinning with a projected rotational velocity of 25.5 km/s. The radius of Delta Scuti changes at 0.3 to 0.9 percent at each pulsation cycle. On average, the star is radiating 40 times the luminosity of the Sun from its photosphere at an effective temperature of 7,000 K.

== Space velocity ==
The space velocity components of this star in the galactic coordinate system are [U, V, W] = [−42, −17, −1] km·s^{−1}. It is following an orbit through the Milky Way galaxy that has an eccentricity of 0.11, carrying it as close as 22.31 kly (6.84 kpc) to, and as far as 27.59 kly (8.46 kpc) from the Galactic Center. If Delta Scuti maintains its current movement and brightness, it will pass within 10 light-years of the Solar System, becoming the brightest star in the sky between 1150000 and 1330000 CE. It will reach an apparent magnitude of −1.84, brighter than the current −1.46 of Sirius.

== Optical companions ==
This star has two optical companions. The first is a +12.2 magnitude star that is 15.2 arcseconds from Delta Scuti. The second is a +9.2 magnitude star that is 53 arcseconds away. Both are distant background stars unrelated to Delta Scuti.

== Nomenclature ==
Flamsteed did not recognise the constellation Scutum and included several of its stars in Aquila. δ Scuti was catalogued as 2 Aquilae. The Bayer designation δ was assigned by Gould rather than Bayer.
