= Alpha Scuti =

Star in the constellation Scutum

α Scuti
- Location of α Scuti (circled)

Observation data Epoch J2000 Equinox ICRS
- Constellation: Scutum
- Right ascension: 18^{h} 35^{m} 12.42776^{s}
- Declination: −08° 14′ 38.6529″
- Apparent magnitude (V): 3.83

Characteristics
- Spectral type: K3III
- U−B color index: +1.53
- B−V color index: +1.34

Astrometry
Radial velocity (R_{v})	+36.50 km/s
Proper motion (μ)	RA: −17.00 mas/yr Dec.: −313.52 mas/yr
Parallax (π)	16.38±0.22 mas
Distance	199 ± 3 ly (61.1 ± 0.8 pc)
Absolute magnitude (M_{V})	−0.08

Details
Mass	1.33 M_{☉}
Radius	20 R_{☉}
Luminosity	186 L_{☉}
Surface gravity (log g)	1.96 cgs
Temperature	4,315 K
Metallicity [Fe/H]	−0.04 dex
Rotational velocity (v sin i)	1.7 km/s

Other designations
- Tianbian, α Sct, 1 Aql, NSV 11056, BD−08°4638, FK5 1482, GC 25385, HD 171443, HIP 91117, HR 6973, SAO 142408, LTT 7377

Database references
SIMBAD	data

Alpha Scuti, also named Tianbian, is an orange-hued star in the southern constellation of Scutum. It is faintly visible to the naked eye with an apparent visual magnitude of 3.83. Based upon an annual parallax shift of 16.38 mas as seen from the Earth, it is located around 199 light years from the Sun. It is moving away from the Sun with a radial velocity of +36.5 km/s.

== Nomenclature ==
Alpha Scuti, Latinized from α Scuti and abbreviated α Sct, is the star's Bayer designation. It has the Flamsteed designation 1 Aquilae, since Flamsteed did not recognize Scutum as a separate constellation and treated it as part of Aquila.

In Chinese astronomy, this star is part of the asterism Tiān Biàn (天弁), which represents a market officer and literally means "Celestial Cap" in reference to ceremonial headgear. The IAU Working Group on Star Names adopted the name Tianbian for this star on 18 June 2026, after this Chinese constellation.

== Properties ==
With a stellar classification of K3 III, the spectrum indicates it is an evolved giant star of type K. Alpha Scuti is a suspected variable star with magnitude range reported as 3.81 to 3.87. The star has an estimated 1.33 times the mass of the Sun, but the outer envelope has expanded to 20 times the Sun's radius. It is radiating 186 times the Sun's luminosity from its inflated photosphere at an effective temperature of 4,315 K.
