= Eta Scuti =

Star in the constellation Scutum

η Scuti
- Location of η Scuti (circled)

Observation data Epoch J2000 Equinox J2000
- Constellation: Scutum
- Right ascension: 18^{h} 57^{m} 03.67027^{s}
- Declination: −05° 50′ 46.7305″
- Apparent magnitude (V): 4.83

Characteristics
- Evolutionary stage: horizontal branch
- Spectral type: K1-III
- U−B color index: +1.02
- B−V color index: +1.08

Astrometry
Radial velocity (R_{v})	−92.22±0.16 km/s
Proper motion (μ)	RA: +61.545 mas/yr Dec.: −41.429 mas/yr
Parallax (π)	15.2960±0.1740 mas
Distance	213 ± 2 ly (65.4 ± 0.7 pc)
Absolute magnitude (M_{V})	0.87

Details
Mass	1.50 M_{☉}
Radius	11.97+0.18 −0.13 R_{☉}
Luminosity	62.7±0.8 L_{☉}
Surface gravity (log g)	2.54 cgs
Temperature	4,693+27 −266 K
Metallicity [Fe/H]	−0.03 dex
Rotational velocity (v sin i)	< 1.0 km/s
Age	2.8 Gyr

Other designations
- η Sct, BD−06°4976, FK5 3821, GC 26013, HD 175751, HIP 93026, HR 7149, SAO 142838, GSC 05127-07358

Database references
SIMBAD	data

Eta Scuti, Latinized from η Scuti, is a single star in the southern constellation of Scutum, near the constellation border with Aquila. Eta Scuti was a latter designation of 9 Aquilae before the official constellation borders were set in 1922. It is visible to the naked eye as a faint, orange-hued star with an apparent visual magnitude of +4.83. This object is located approximately 213 light-years from the Sun based on parallax, and is moving closer with a radial velocity of −92 km/s.

This is an aging giant star with a stellar classification of K1-III. After exhausting the supply of hydrogen at its core, the star cooled and expanded until currently it has 12 times the girth of the Sun. It is a red clump giant, which indicates it is presently on the horizontal branch and is generating energy through core helium fusion. The star is about 2.8 billion years old with 1.5 times the mass of the Sun. It is radiating 63 times the Sun's luminosity from its swollen photosphere at an effective temperature of 4,693 K.
