= Scutum (constellation) =

Small constellation in the southern celestial hemisphere

- Constellation
- List of stars in Scutum
- Abbreviation: Sct
- Genitive: Scuti
- Pronunciation: /ˈskjuːtəm/, genitive /ˈskjuːtaɪ/
- Symbolism: the Shield of John III Sobieski
- Right ascension: 18.7^{h}
- Declination: −10°
- Quadrant: SQ4
- Area: 109 sq. deg. (84th)
- Main stars: 2
- Bayer/Flamsteed stars: 7
- Stars brighter than 3.00^{m}: 0
- Stars within 10.00 pc (32.62 ly): 0
- Brightest star: α Sct (Tianbian) (3.85^{m})
- Nearest star: WISE J1824−0536
- Messier objects: 2
- Meteor showers: June Scutids
- Bordering constellations: Aquila; Sagittarius; Serpens Cauda
- Visible at latitudes between +75° and −90°. Best visible at 21:00 (9 p.m.) during the month of August.

Scutum is a small constellation. Its name is Latin for shield, and it was originally named Scutum Sobiescianum by Johannes Hevelius in 1684. Located just south of the celestial equator, its four brightest stars form a narrow diamond shape. It is one of the 88 IAU designated constellations defined in 1922.

== History ==
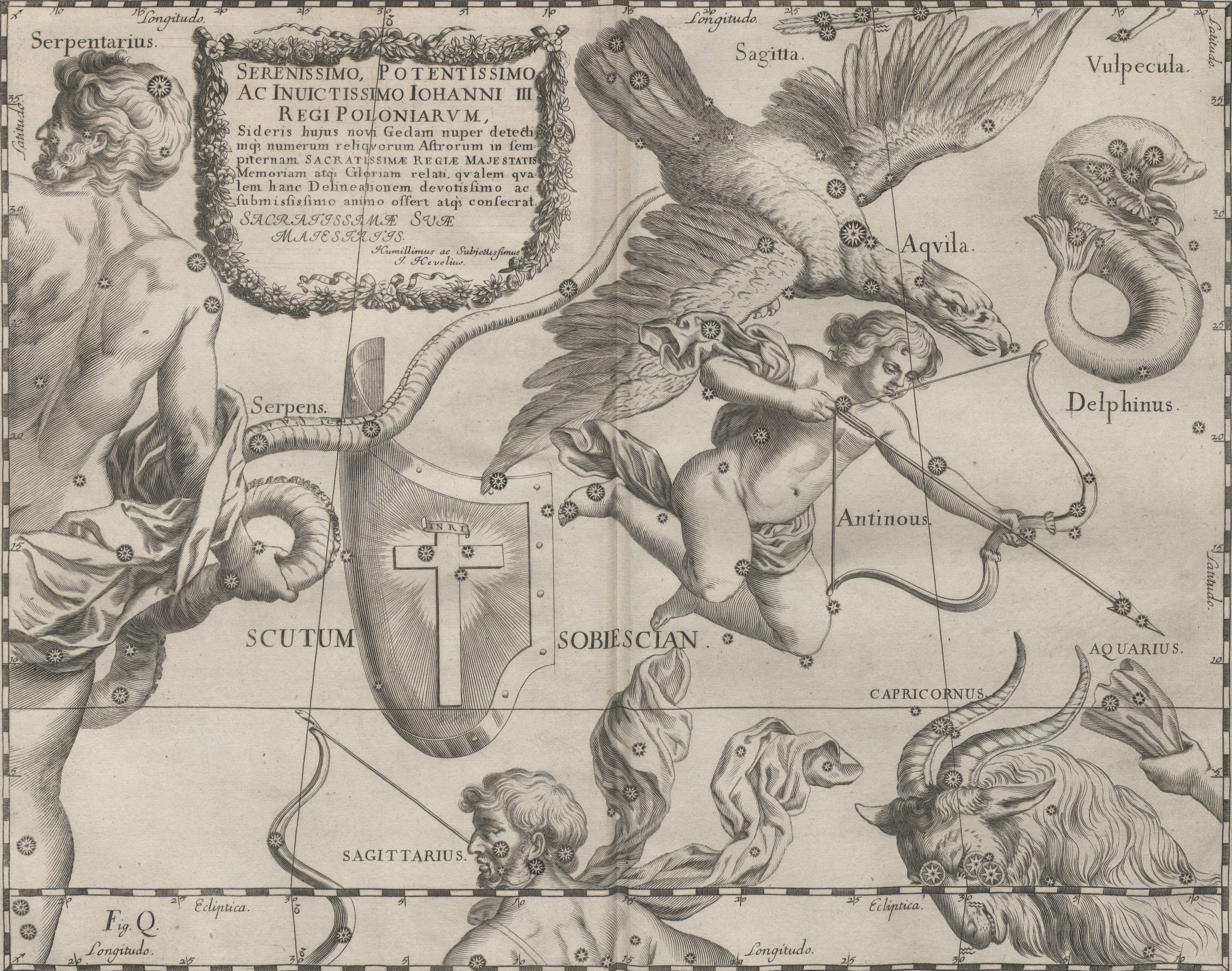
Scutum Sobiescianum in Firmamentum Sobiescianum sive Uranographia 1690

Scutum was named in 1684 by Polish astronomer Johannes Hevelius (Jan Heweliusz), who originally named it Scutum Sobiescianum (Shield of Sobieski) to commemorate the victory of the Christian forces led by Polish King John III Sobieski (Jan III Sobieski) in the Battle of Vienna in 1683. Later, the name was shortened to Scutum.

Five bright stars of Scutum (α Sct, β Sct, δ Sct, ε Sct and η Sct) were previously known as 1, 6, 2, 3, and 9 Aquilae respectively.

The constellation of Scutum was adopted by the International Astronomical Union in 1922 as one of the 88 constellations covering the entire sky, with the official abbreviation of "Sct". The constellation boundaries are defined by a quadrilateral. In the equatorial coordinate system, the right ascension coordinates of these borders lie between 18^{h} 21.6^{m} and 18^{h} 59.3^{m} , while the declination coordinates are between −3.83° and −15.94°.

Coincidentally, the Chinese also associated these stars with battle armor, incorporating them into the larger asterism known as Tien Pien, i.e., the Heavenly Casque (or Helmet).

== Features ==
=== Stars ===
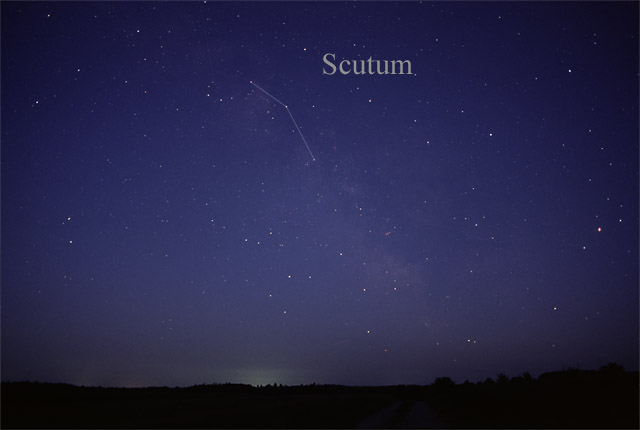
The constellation Scutum as it can be seen by the naked eye

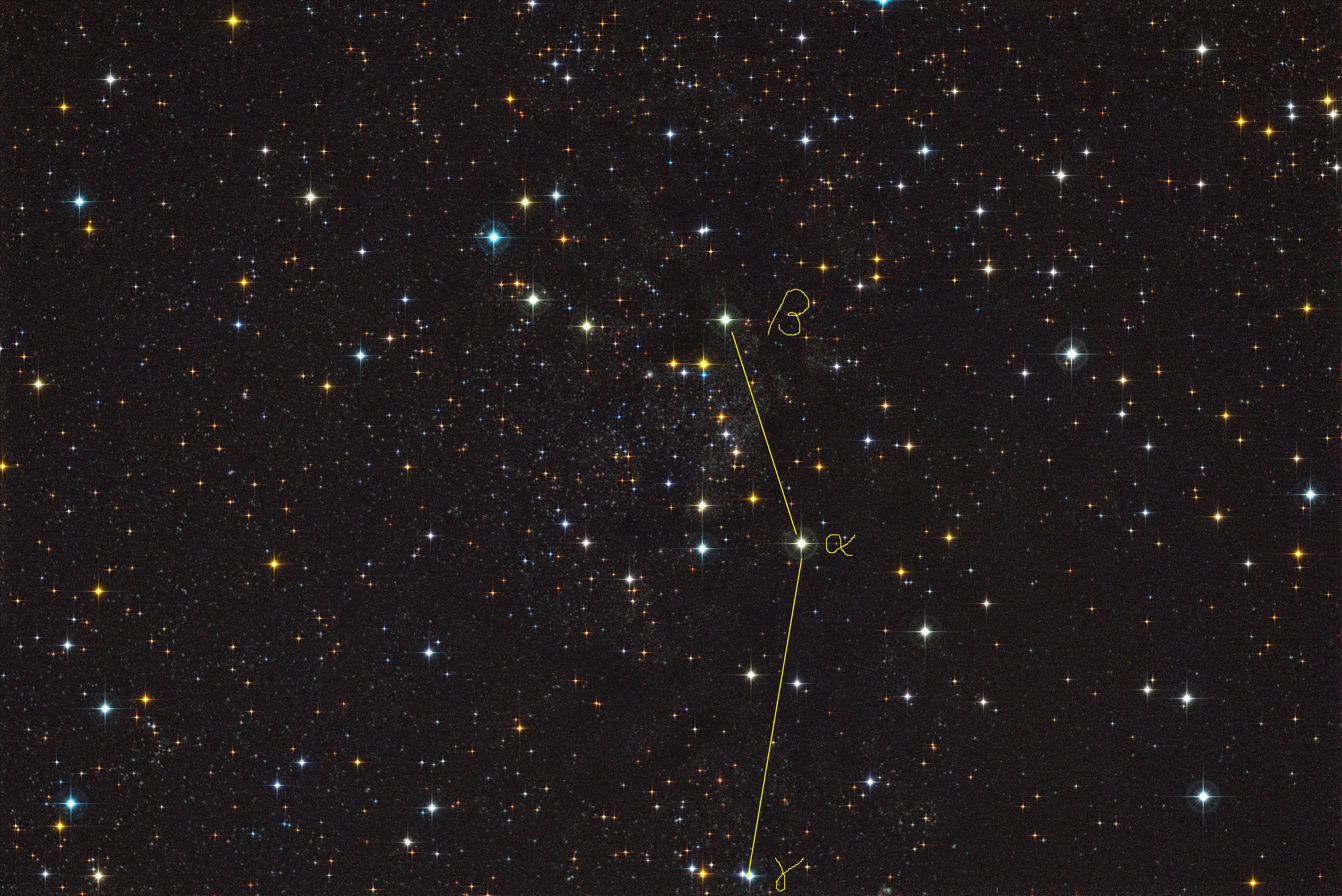
The constellation Scutum in the night sky, enhanced for color and contrast

Scutum is not a bright constellation, with the brightest star, Alpha Scuti, being a K-type giant star at magnitude 3.85. However, some stars are notable in the constellation. Beta Scuti is the second brightest at magnitude 4.22, followed by Delta Scuti at magnitude 4.72. It is also known as 6 Aquilae. Beta Scuti is a binary system, with the primary with a spectral type similar to the Sun, although it is 1,270 times brighter. Delta Scuti is a bluish white giant star, which is now coming at the direction of the Solar System. Within 1.3 million years it will come as close to 10 light years from Earth, and will be much brighter than Sirius by that time.

UY Scuti is a red supergiant and is also one of the largest stars currently known with a radius over 900 times that of the Sun. RSGC1-F01 is another red supergiant whose radius is over 1,450 times that of the Sun. Scutum contains several clusters of supergiant stars, including RSGC1, Stephenson 2 and RSGC3.

=== Deep-sky objects ===
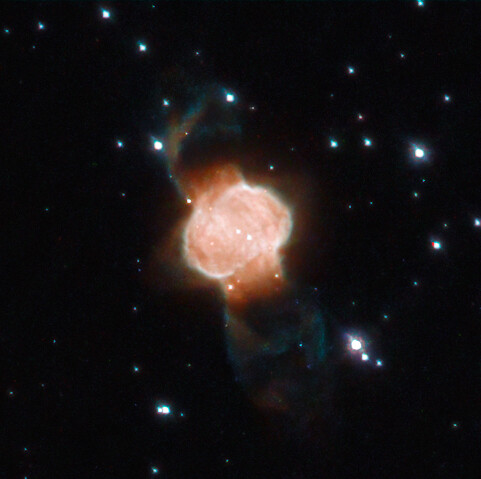
M1-63, a bipolar planetary nebula located in the constellation of Scutum (the Shield)

Although not a large constellation, Scutum contains several open clusters, as well as a globular cluster and a planetary nebula. The two best known deep sky objects in Scutum are M11 (the Wild Duck Cluster) and the open cluster M26 (NGC 6694). The globular cluster NGC 6712 and the planetary nebula IC 1295 can be found in the eastern part of the constellation, only 24 arcminutes apart.

The most prominent open cluster in Scutum is the Wild Duck Cluster, M11. It was named by William Henry Smyth in 1844 for its resemblance in the eyepiece to a flock of ducks in flight. The cluster, 6200 light-years from Earth and 20 light-years in diameter, contains approximately 3000 stars, making it a particularly rich cluster. It is around 220 million years old, although some studies give older estimates. Estimates for the mass of the star cluster range from 3,700 M_{☉} to 11,000 M_{☉}.

== Space exploration ==
The space probe Pioneer 11 is moving in the direction of this constellation. It will not be near the closest star in this constellation for over a million years at its present speed, by which time its batteries will be long dead.

== See also ==
- Scutum (Chinese astronomy)
- Taurus Poniatovii - a constellation created by the Polish astronomer Marcin Odlanicki Poczobutt in 1777 to honor King of Poland Stanisław August Poniatowski.

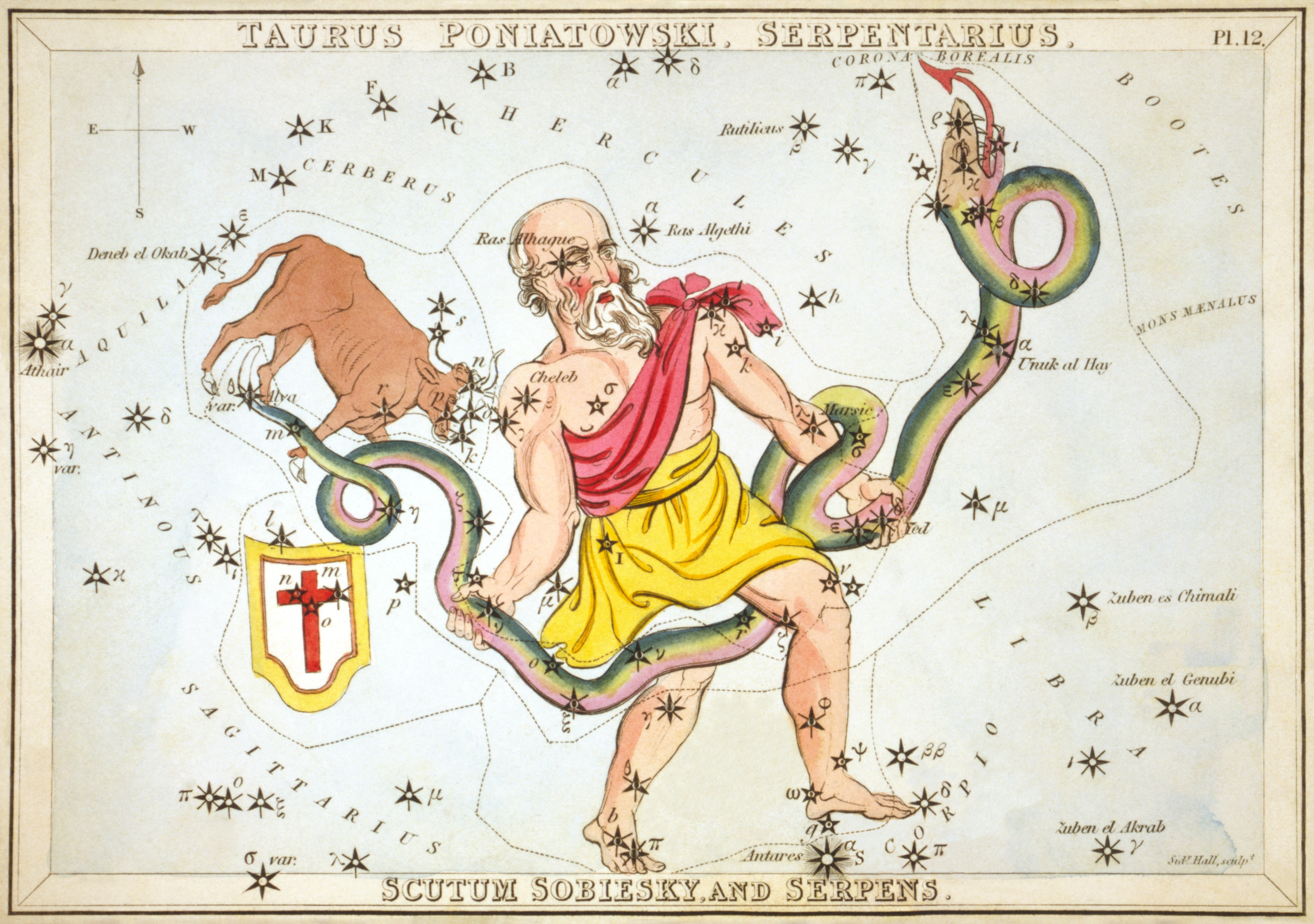
Serpens held by Ophiuchus, as depicted in Urania's Mirror, a set of constellation cards published in London c. 1825. Above the tail of the serpent is the now-obsolete constellation Taurus Poniatovii while below it is Scutum.

== Sources ==
- Ian Ridpath and Wil Tirion (2017). Stars and Planets Guide (5th ed.), Collins, London. ISBN 978-0-00-823927-5. Princeton University Press, Princeton. ISBN 978-0-69-117788-5.
