= Tianfu =

Tianfu mainly refers to the Municipality of Chengdu or the Province of Sichuan.

Tianfu may refer to:

== Locations in China ==
- Sichuan Basin, a lowland region in southwestern China
- Tianfu New Area, an in-city development area established in 2011 in Chengdu, China
- Chengdu Tianfu International Airport, the second civil international airport of Chengdu, China
- Tianfu, Chongqing (天府), a town in Chongqing
- Tianfu, Pengxi County (天福), a town in Pengxi County, Sichuan
- Tianfu Township (田阜乡), a township in Xingping, Shaanxi

== Historical eras ==
- Tianfu (天復, 901–904), era name used by Emperor Zhaozong of Tang (also used briefly in 907 by Wang Jian (Former Shu))
- Tianfu (天輔, 1117–1123), era name used by Emperor Taizu of Jin

== See also ==
- Thian Hock Keng, also known as Tianfu Temple, a Mazuist temple in Singapore
- Tau Aquilae, a star also named Tianfu
