= HD 187734 =

Star in the constellation Aquila

Observation data Epoch J2000 Equinox ICRS
- Constellation: Aquila
- Right ascension: 19^{h} 51^{m} 26.84135^{s}
- Declination: +04° 05′ 19.0767″
- Apparent magnitude (V): 6.6242±0.0012 (6.71 + 9.42)

Characteristics
- Spectral type: K2III + A5V

Astrometry
Radial velocity (R_{v})	−3.70±0.21 km/s
Proper motion (μ)	RA: −1.70 mas/yr Dec.: −5.82 mas/yr
Parallax (π)	1.31±0.86 mas
Distance	approx. 2,000 ly (approx. 800 pc)

Details

HD 187734 A
Mass	8.8±0.1 M_{☉}
Radius	109 R_{☉}
Luminosity	3,339 L_{☉}
Surface gravity (log g)	1.17 cgs
Temperature	4,128 K
Age	29.0±3.4 Myr

HD 187734 B
Mass	2.7 M_{☉}
Radius	3.1 R_{☉}
Luminosity	100 L_{☉}
Surface gravity (log g)	3.89 cgs
Temperature	10.312 K

Other designations
- BD+03°4172, HD 188385, HIP 97709, SAO 125141, WDS J19514+0405

Database references
SIMBAD	data
- B

HD 187734 is double star in the equatorial constellation of Aquila. The primary is a magnitude 6.6 giant star, while the companion is a magnitude 9.4 A-type main sequence star. As of 2014, the pair had an angular separation of 5″ along a position angle of 99°.
