= Epsilon Aquilae =

Binary star in the constellation of Aquila

ε Aquilae
- Location of ε Aquilae (circled)

Observation data Epoch J2000 Equinox ICRS
- Constellation: Aquila
- Right ascension: 18^{h} 59^{m} 37.356^{s}
- Declination: +15° 04′ 05.81″
- Apparent magnitude (V): +4.02

Characteristics
- Spectral type: K1-IIICN0.5
- U−B color index: +1.04
- B−V color index: +1.08
- R−I color index: +0.52

Astrometry
Radial velocity (R_{v})	−45.9±0.3 km/s
Proper motion (μ)	RA: −51.062 mas/yr Dec.: −69.439 mas/yr
Parallax (π)	18.1821±0.3319 mas
Distance	179 ± 3 ly (55 ± 1 pc)
Absolute bolometric magnitude (M_{bol})	+0.30

Orbit
Period (P)	1,270.6±1.1 d
Semi-major axis (a)	≥ 86.9 ± 2.3 Gm (0.581 ± 0.015 AU)
Eccentricity (e)	0.272±0.026
Periastron epoch (T)	41718±17 MJD
Argument of periastron (ω) (secondary)	82±5°
Semi-amplitude (K_{1}) (primary)	5.17±0.13 km/s

Details

ε Aql Aa
Mass	2.1+0.4 −0.2 M_{☉}
Radius	10.13+0.21 −0.22 R_{☉}
Luminosity	54±5 L_{☉}
Surface gravity (log g)	2.91 cgs
Temperature	4,760 K
Metallicity [Fe/H]	0.00 dex
Rotational velocity (v sin i)	4.4 km/s

ε Aql Ab
Mass	0.47±0.05 M_{☉}

Other designations
- Arin-majlep, ε Aql, 13 Aql, BD+14 3736, FK5 712, GC 26091, HD 176411, HIP 93244, HR 7176, SAO 104318, PPM 135586, WDS J18596+1504A

Database references
SIMBAD	data

Epsilon Aquilae, also named Arin-majlep, is a binary star system in the equatorial constellation of Aquila, near the western constellation boundary with Hercules. The system has an apparent visual magnitude of 4.02 and is visible to the naked eye. Based upon an annual parallax of 18.1821 mas, Epsilon Aquilae lies at a distance of approximately 179 light-years (55 parsecs) from Earth, but is drifting closer with a radial velocity of −46 km/s.

== Nomenclature ==
Epsilon Aquilae is a Bayer designation that is Latinized from ε Aquilae, and abbreviated Epsilon Aql or ε Aql.

It had the traditional name Deneb el Okab /ˈdɛnɛb ɛl ˈoʊkæb/, from an Arabic term ذنب العقاب ðanab al-ʽuqāb "the tail of the eagle", and the Mandarin names Woo /ˈwuː/ and Yuë /ˈjuːeɪ/, derived from and representing the state Wú (吳), an old state located at the mouth of the Yangtze River, and Yuè (越), an old state in Zhejiang province (together with 19 Capricorni in Twelve States asterism). These names were shared with the brighter ζ Aquilae. Epsilon Aquilae could be more precisely called Deneb el Okab Borealis, because it is situated to the north of Zeta Aquilae, which can therefore be called Deneb el Okab Australis.

In Marshallese, ε, ζ, and ω Aquilae are known as Arin-majlep, the "replica of the Big Eye", with the Big Eye (Majlep) being Altair. The IAU Working Group on Star Names adopted the name Arin-majlep for ε Aquilae on 18 June 2026. ζ Aquilae is officially named Okab, shortened from Deneb el Okab.

== Properties ==
The binary nature of this system was reported by German astronomer F. Kustner in 1914, but it was not confirmed until 1974. It is a single-lined spectroscopic binary system; the pair orbit each other over a period of 1,271 days (3.5 years) with an eccentricity (ovalness) of 0.27. There are two visual companions to Epsilon Aquilae, both reported by German astronomer R. Engelmann in 1887. Component B is a magnitude 10.56 star at an angular separation of 122.00″ along a position angle (PA) of 184° relative to the primary, as of 2014. At magnitude 11.25, component C is at a separation of 142.90″ with a PA of 159°, as of 2015.

The primary component of this system is an evolved giant star with a stellar classification of K1-III CN0.5, showing a mild overabundance of the CN molecule in the spectrum. The chemical abundances of the star suggest it has gone through first dredge-up. It has more than double the mass of the Sun and has expanded to ten times the Sun's radius. The star shines with 54 times the Sun's luminosity, which is being radiated from its outer envelope at an effective temperature of 4,760 K. At this heat, it glows with the orange-hue of a K-type star.

This has been designated a barium star, meaning its atmosphere is extremely enriched with barium and other heavy elements. However, this is disputed, with astronomer Andrew McWilliam (1990) finding normal abundances from an s-process.
