= PSR J1951+1123 =

Pulsar in the constellation Aquila

Observation data Epoch J2000 Equinox J2000
- Constellation: Aquila
- Right ascension: 19^{h} 51^{m} 08.25^{s}
- Declination: +11° 23′ 25.2″

Characteristics
- Spectral type: Pulsar

Astrometry
Distance	5,216 ly (1,660 pc)

Details
Rotation	5.0940830275 s
Age	26.6 Myr

Other designations
- PSR J1951+1123

Database references
SIMBAD	data

PSR J1951+1123 is a pulsar. This pulsar is notable due to its exceptionally long period, one of the longest known, with a period of 5.094 seconds and is characteristic age of 26.6 million years old.
