= NGC 6781 =

Planetary nebula in the constellation Aquila

Emission nebula
- Planetary nebula
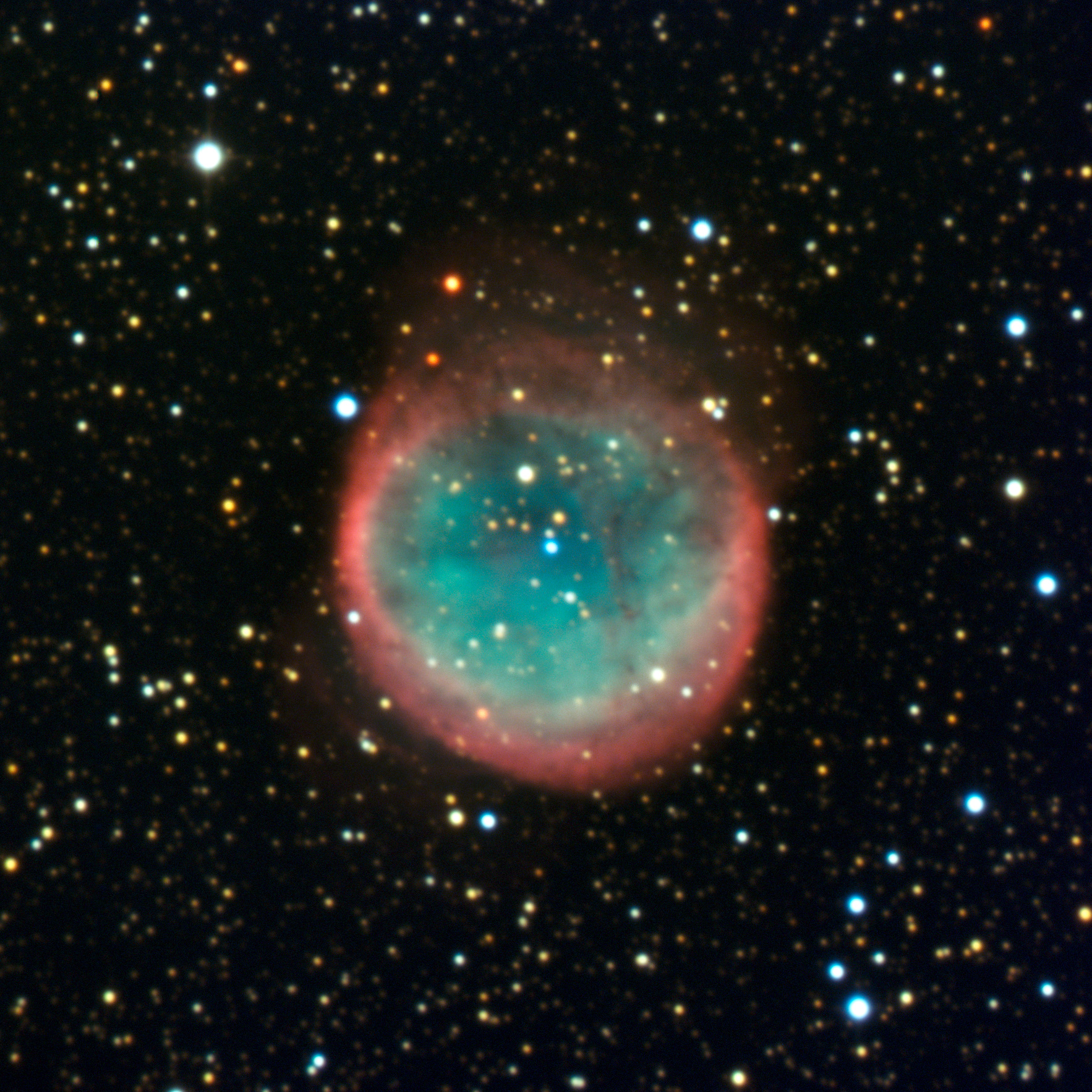
- NGC 6781 from the La Silla Observatory

Observation data: J2000 epoch
- Right ascension: 19^{h} 18^{m} 28.085^{s}
- Declination: +06° 32′ 19.29″
- Distance: 1,500 ly (460 pc)
- Apparent magnitude (V): 11.4
- Apparent dimensions (V): 1′.9 × 1′.8
- Constellation: Aquila

Physical characteristics
- Radius: 0.44 ly
- Designations: IRAS 19160+0626, NGC 6781

NGC 6781, also known as the Snowglobe Nebula or Ghost of the Moon, is a planetary nebula located in the equatorial constellation of Aquila, about 2.5° east-northeast of the 5th magnitude star 19 Aquilae. It was discovered July 30, 1788 by the Anglo-German astronomer William Herschel. The nebula lies at a distance of 1,500 ly from the Sun. It has a visual magnitude of 11.4 and spans an angular size of 1.9 × 1.8 arcminutes.

The bipolar dust shell of this nebula is believed to be barrel-shaped and is being viewed from nearly pole-on. It has an outer angular radius of 61″; equivalent to a physical radius of 0.44 ly (0.135 pc). The total mass of gas ejected as the central star passed through its last asymptotic giant branch (AGB) thermal pulse event is 0.41 M_{☉}, while the estimated dust mass is 1.53 M_{☉}.

The magnitude 16.88 central star of the planetary nebula is a white dwarf with a spectral type of DAO. It has an M-type co-moving companion at a projected separation of under 5,000 AU. The white dwarf progenitor star had an estimated initial mass of ~2.5 M_{☉}. It left the AGB and entered the cooling stage around 9,400 years ago.
