= NGC 6756 =

Open cluster in the constellation Aquila

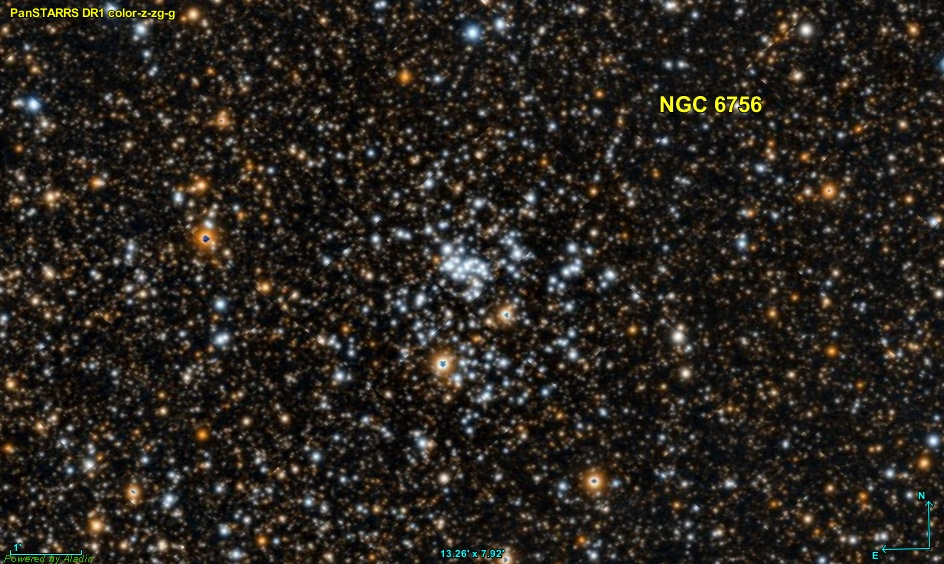
- NGC 6756 imaged by Pan-STARRS

Observation data (J2000 epoch)
- Right ascension: 19^{h} 08^{m} 44.(9)^{s}
- Declination: +04° 43′ 0(1)″
- Distance: 6,363 ly (1,951 pc)
- Apparent magnitude (V): 10.6
- Apparent dimensions (V): 4.0′

Physical characteristics
- Other designations: Cr 398, C1906+046, OCISM 20, OLC 99.

Associations
- Constellation: Aquila

NGC 6756 is a small open star cluster in the constellation Aquila, close to NGC 6755.
