= NGC 6751 =

Planetary nebula in the constellation Aquila

Emission nebula
- Planetary nebula
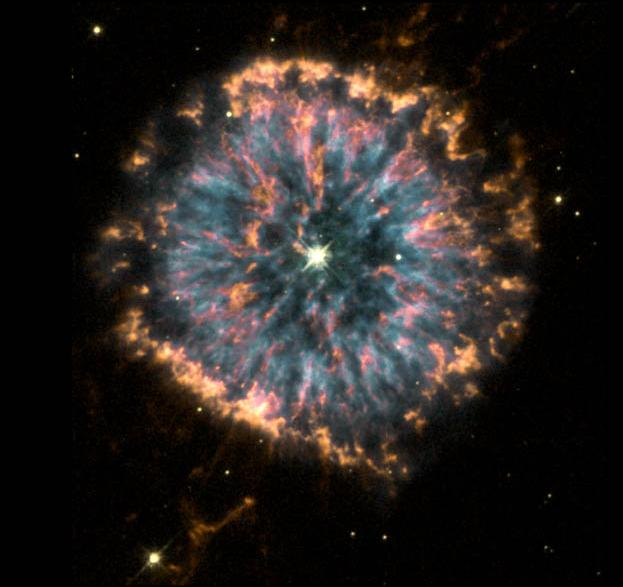
- A Hubble Space Telescope (HST) image of NGC 6751's inner bubble Credit: HST/NASA/ESA.

Observation data: J2000.0 epoch
- Right ascension: 19^{h} 05^{m} 55.6^{s}
- Declination: −05° 59′ 32.9″
- Distance: 6,500 ly (2,000 pc)
- Apparent magnitude (V): 11.9
- Apparent dimensions (V): 0.43′
- Constellation: Aquila

Physical characteristics
- Radius: 0.4 ly
- Absolute magnitude (V): 0.4
- Designations: Glowing Eye Nebula, GSC 05140-03497, PK 029-05 1, PN Th 1-J, CSI-06-19031, HD 177656, PMN J1905-0559, PN Sa 2-382, EM* CDS 1043, HuLo 1, PN ARO 101, PN G029.2-05.9, GCRV 11549, IRAS 19032-0604, PN VV' 477, SCM 227, GSC2 S3002210353, 2MASX J19055556-0559327, PN VV 219, UCAC2 29903231

NGC 6751, also known as the Glowing Eye Nebula or the Dandelion Puff Ball Nebula, is a planetary nebula in the constellation Aquila. It is estimated to be about 6,500 light-years (2.0 kiloparsecs) away.

NGC 6751 was discovered by the astronomer Albert Marth on 20 July 1863. John Louis Emil Dreyer, the compiler of the New General Catalogue, described the object as "pretty bright, small". The object was assigned a duplicate designation, NGC 6748.

The nebula was the subject of the winning picture in the 2009 Gemini School Astronomy Contest, in which Australian high school students competed to select an astronomical target to be imaged by Gemini.

NGC 6751 is an easy telescopic target for deep-sky observers because its location is immediately southeast of the extremely red-colored cool carbon star V Aquilae.

== Properties ==
NGC 6751, like all planetary nebulae was formed when a dying star threw off its outer layers of gas several thousand years ago. It is estimated to be around 0.8 light-years in diameter.

NGC 6751 has a complex bipolar structure. There is a bright, inner bubble (shown in the photo), as well as two fainter halos. (The outer halo, with a radius of 50″ is extremely faint and is broken, while the inner halo with a radius of 27″ is roughly spherical). On both the west and east sides of the inner shell, knots can be seen that are surrounded by faint "lobes". These lobes are actually a ring, and the eastern side is nearer than the western side. As a whole, the system is approaching the Solar System with a heliocentric radial velocity of −31.7 km/s.

The central star of the nebula has a similar spectrum to a Wolf–Rayet star (spectral type [WC4]), and has an effective temperature of about 140,000 K and a radius of about 0.13 R_{☉}. It is losing mass at a rate of 1×10^{−6} M_{☉} per year, and its surface composition is mostly helium and carbon.

The winning image of the 2009 Gemini Astronomy Contest shows a nebula at the top left of NGC 6751.

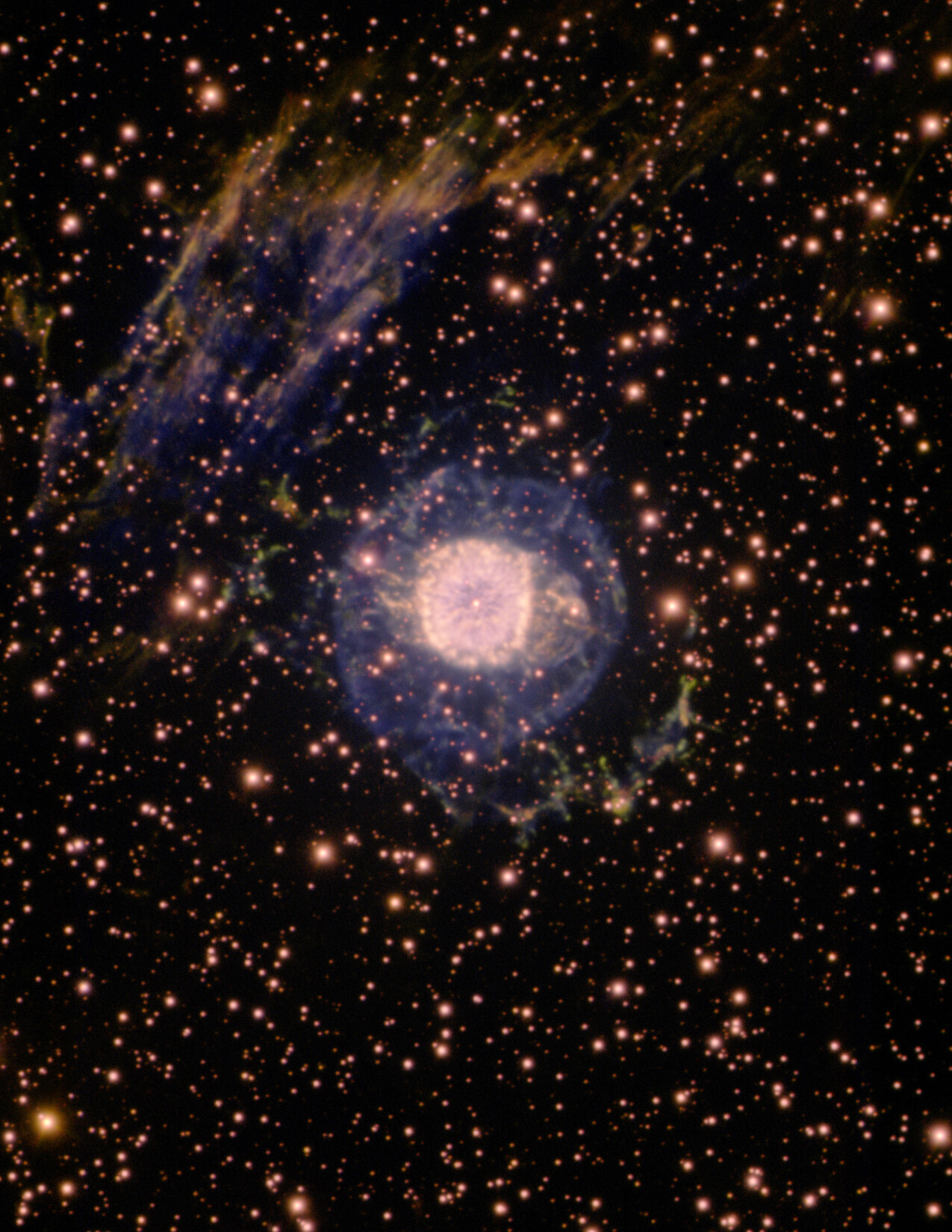
NGC 6751, the Glowing Eye Nebula. Gemini South image, winner of the 2009 Gemini School Astronomy Contest. Credit: International Gemini Observatory/NOIRLab/NSF/AURA.

This 80 x 40 arcsec nebula was discovered in 1990 by Hua & Louise at the Newton focus of the Foucault telescope, 120cm in diameter at Observatoire de Haute Provence (O.H.P.) Saint Michel l'Observatoire.

Emission-line images and isophotal maps of NGC 6751 (PK 29−5 1), showing its double-halo structure.
