= NGC 6709 =

Open cluster in the constellation Aquila

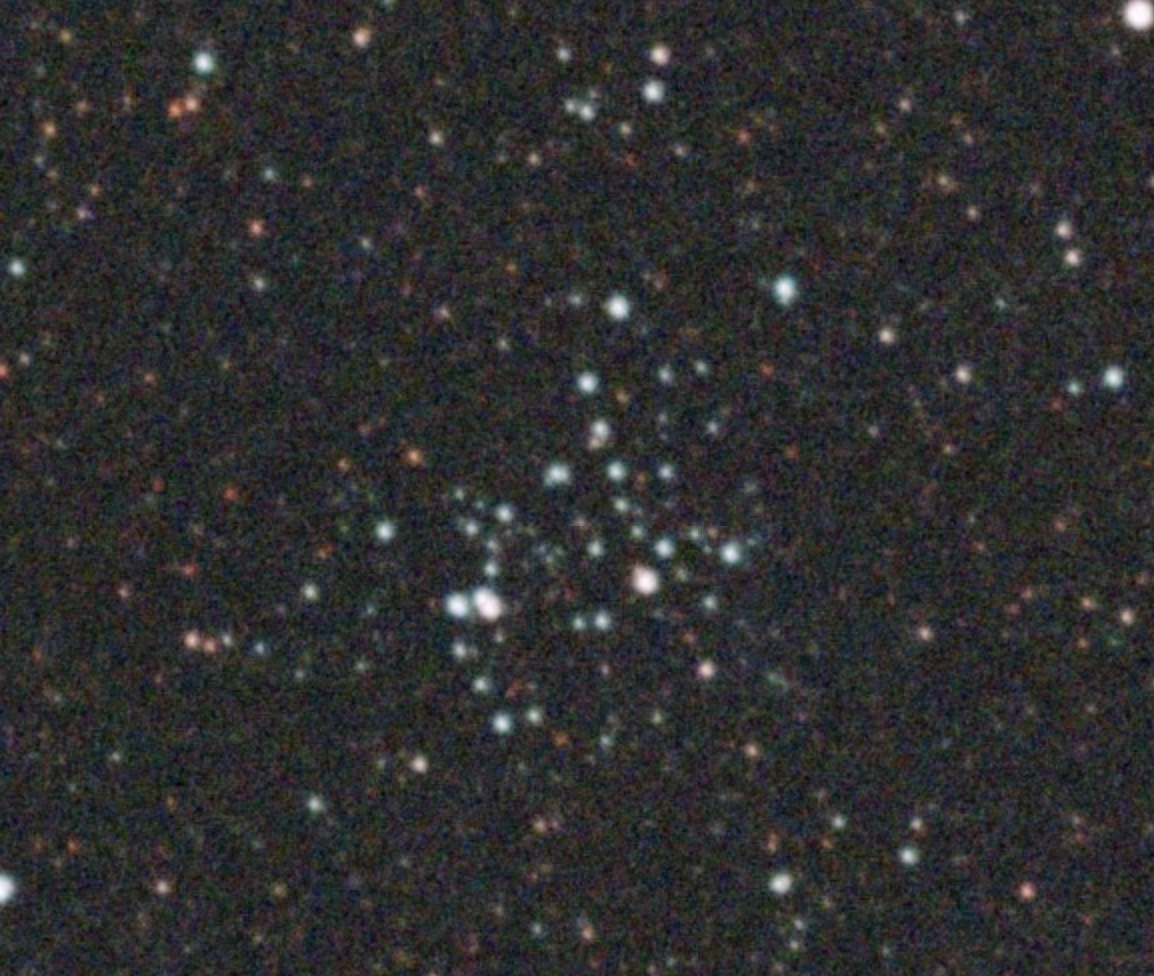
- NGC 6709 imaged in 2026

Observation data (J2000 epoch)
- Right ascension: 18^{h} 51^{m} 20.6^{s}
- Declination: +10° 20′ 02″
- Distance: 3,510 ly (1,075 pc)
- Apparent magnitude (V): 6.7
- Apparent dimensions (V): 13'

Physical characteristics
- Radius: 26 ly (tidal)
- Estimated age: 141 Myr
- Other designations: NGC 6709, Cr 392

Associations
- Constellation: Aquila

NGC 6709 is an open cluster of stars in the equatorial constellation of Aquila, some 5° to the southwest of the star Zeta Aquilae. It is situated toward the center of the galaxy at a distance of 3,510 light-years.

This cluster has a Trumpler class of IV 2 m, and is considered moderately rich with 305 member stars. It is around 141 million years old; about the same as the Pleiades. The core radius of NGC 6709 is 2.2 ly (0.68 pc) and the tidal radius 26.4 ly (8.08 pc). It contains two Be stars and one of them is a shell star. There is one candidate red giant member.

On the evening of November 13, 1984, David H. Levy discovered his first comet less than a degree from this cluster.

== Gallery ==
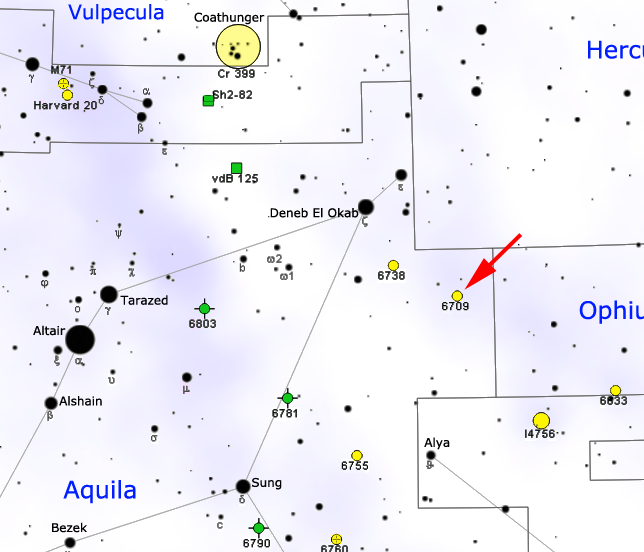
Location diagram of NGC 6709
