= 19 Aquilae =

Star in the constellation Aquila

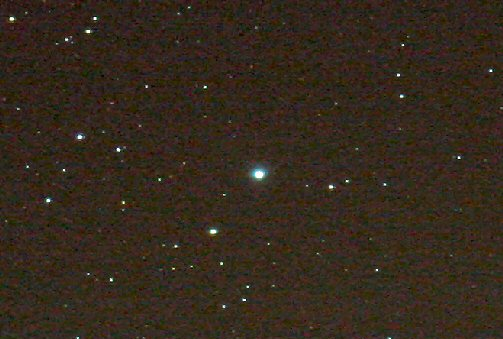
- Image captured from Mount Laguna, California

Observation data Epoch J2000.0 Equinox ICRS
- Constellation: Aquila
- Right ascension: 19^{h} 08^{m} 59.91479^{s}
- Declination: +06° 04′ 23.5840″
- Apparent magnitude (V): 5.227

Characteristics
- Evolutionary stage: main sequence
- Spectral type: F0 III-IV
- Apparent magnitude (U): 5.59±0.010
- Apparent magnitude (B): 5.57±0.007
- Apparent magnitude (V): 5.23±0.009
- U−B color index: +0.020
- B−V color index: +0.345
- Variable type: suspected γ Dor

Astrometry
Radial velocity (R_{v})	−46.7 km/s
Proper motion (μ)	RA: −13.024 mas/yr Dec.: −80.085 mas/yr
Parallax (π)	21.0662±0.3703 mas
Distance	155 ± 3 ly (47.5 ± 0.8 pc)
Absolute magnitude (M_{V})	1.94

Details
Mass	1.50 M_{☉}
Radius	2.46 R_{☉}
Luminosity	12.4 L_{☉}
Surface gravity (log g)	3.83 cgs
Temperature	6,906 K
Metallicity [Fe/H]	+0.03 dex
Rotational velocity (v sin i)	57.0 km/s
Age	2.25 Gyr

Other designations
- 19 Sge, BD+05°4040, FK5 3530, HD 178596, HIP 94068, HR 7266, SAO 124318

Database references
SIMBAD	data

19 Aquilae is a single star located 142 light-years (44 parsecs) away from the Sun in the equatorial constellation of Aquila. 19 Aquilae is the Flamsteed designation. It is visible to the naked eye as a dim, yellow-white hued star with an apparent visual magnitude of 5.23. The star is moving closer to the Earth with a heliocentric radial velocity of −46.7 km/s.

This object has a stellar classification of F0 III-IV, with the luminosity class matching an evolving star transitioning from the subgiant to a giant stage. Poretti et al. (2003) list it as a suspected Gamma Doradus variable, and it is located near the cooler end of the instability strip on the Hertzsprung–Russell diagram. These spatial coordinates are a source of X-ray emission, which is most likely coming from the star.

19 Aquilae is an estimated 2.25 billion years old with a moderately high rate of spin, showing a projected rotational velocity of 57.0 km/s. It has 1.5 times the mass of the Sun and 2.5 times the Sun's radius. The star is radiating 12.4 times the luminosity of the Sun from its photosphere at an effective temperature of 6,906 K.
