= NGC 6755 =

Open cluster in the constellation Aquila

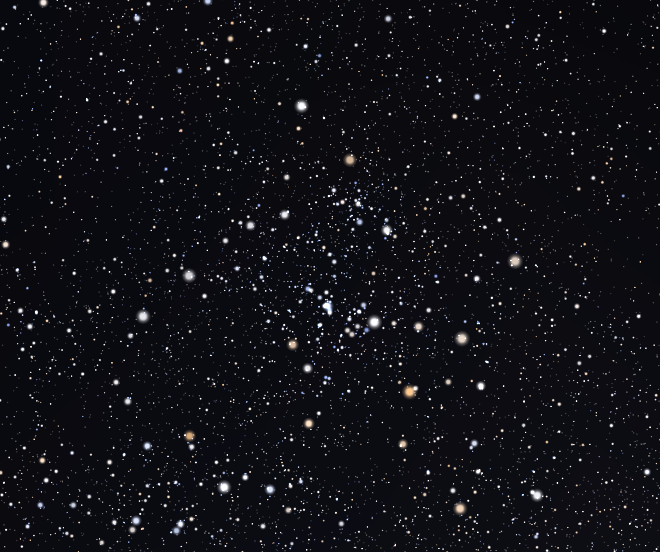
- NGC 6755 (taken from Stellarium)

Observation data (J2000 epoch)
- Right ascension: 19^{h} 07^{m} 46.1^{s}
- Declination: +04° 13′ 26″
- Distance: 8,060 ly (2,471.2 pc)
- Apparent magnitude (V): 7.5
- Apparent dimensions (V): 15'

Physical characteristics
- Estimated age: 250 Myr
- Other designations: NGC 6755, Cr 397

Associations
- Constellation: Aquila

NGC 6755 is an open cluster of stars in the equatorial constellation of Aquila, positioned about 3° to the east of the star Delta Aquilae. It was discovered by the Anglo-German astronomer William Herschel on July 30, 1785 and is located at a distance of 8,060 light years from the Sun. NGC 6756 lies 30′ to the northeast of NGC 6755, with the pair forming a visual double cluster. However, they probably do not form a binary cluster system since they have different ages and are too distant from each other.

This cluster has a Trumpler class of II2r with a visual magnitude of 7.5 and it spans an angular size 15′. It has an estimated age of 250 million years, based on the main sequence turnoff. A total of 71 variable stars have been detected in the field of this cluster, of which 31 are eclipsing binaries, seven are pulsating variables, and 28 are most likely irregular variable red giants.

== Gallery ==
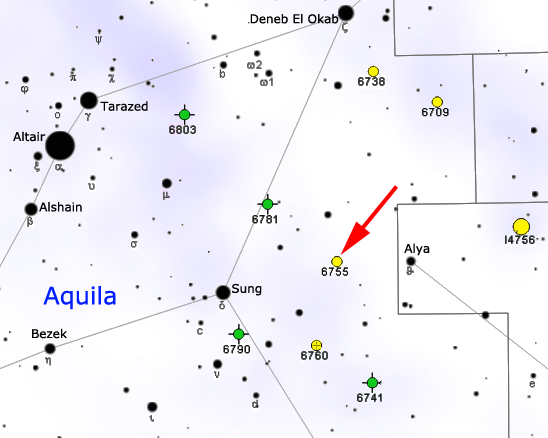
Map showing location of NGC 6755 (Roberto Mura)
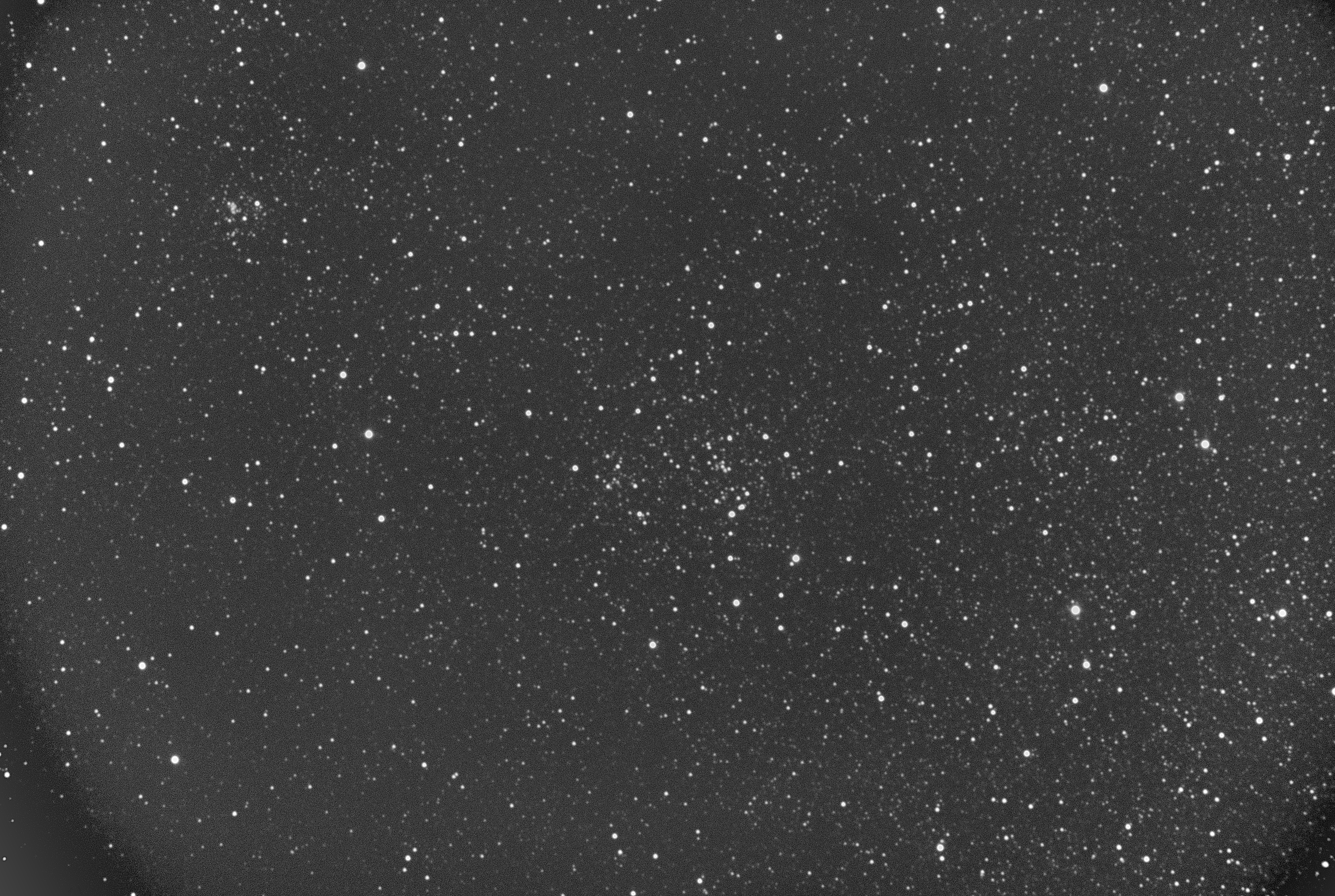
Imagen del cúmulo abierto NGC 6755 en la constelación del Águila
