= NGC 6778 =

Planetary nebula in the constellation Aquila

Emission nebula
- Planetary nebula
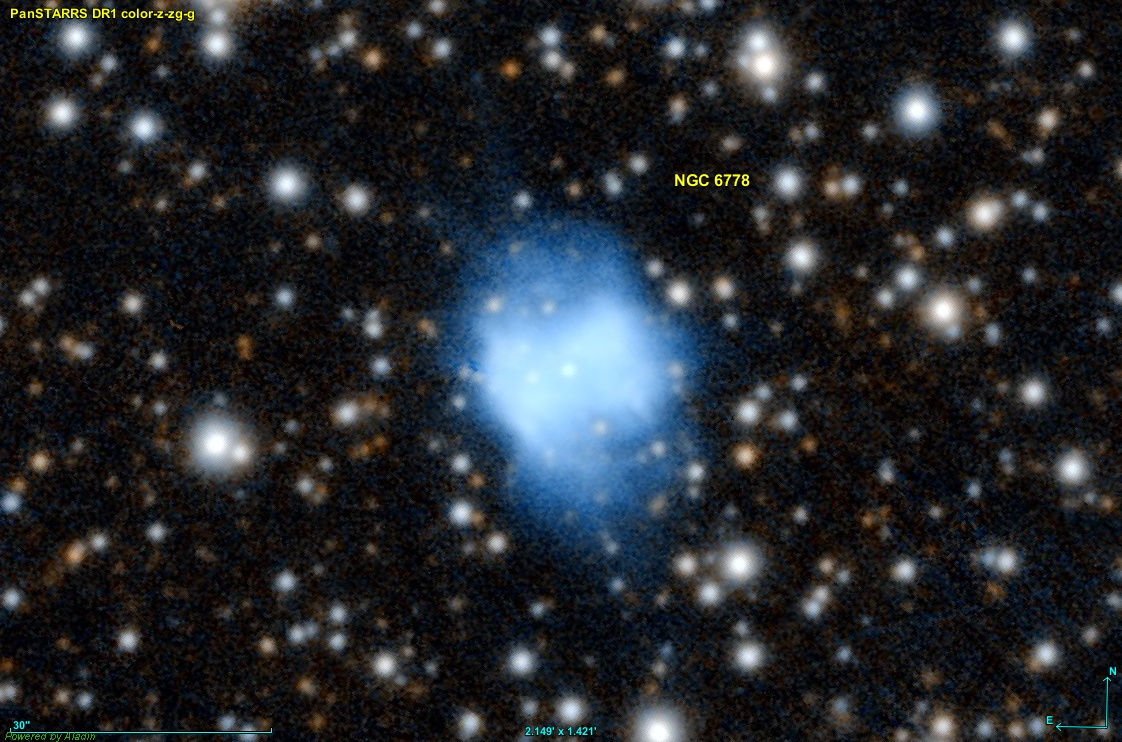
- NGC 6778 (center)

Observation data: J2000 epoch
- Right ascension: 19^{h} 18^{m} 25.0^{s}
- Declination: −01° 35′ 47″
- Distance: 10,300 ly (3,150 pc)
- Apparent magnitude (V): 11.9
- Apparent diameter: 8.5″
- Constellation: Aquila
- Designations: NGC 6778 or 6785, HD 180871

NGC 6778 is a planetary nebula (PN) located about 10,300 light years away from the Sun in the equatorial constellation of Aquila. It is positioned 5° to the SSW of the prominent star Delta Aquilae. This nebula was discovered by German astronomer Albert Marth during the period 1863–1865. English astronomer John Herschel may have mistakenly catalogued it as NGC 6785, as nothing can be found now at the coordinates he gave for it. In the New General Catalogue it was described as a "small, elongated, ill-defined disc".

This planetary nebula displays a disrupted morphology, with a roughly S-shaped feature projecting out of an irregular shell, along with linear jet-like forms. The inner part contains a highly distorted elliptical ring oriented along an east–west direction. The nebula and ring have an angular size of 8.5″ and they are about 4,400 years old, while the jets are around 1,700 years old.

At the center of the nebula is a close binary star system with an orbital period of just 3.68 hours, one of the shortest known among the binary central stars that form a planetary nebulae. Their proximity to each other provides strong evidence that they have passed through a common-envelope (CE) phase earlier in their evolution. The pair may now consist of a primary star with 0.6 M_{☉}, a red dwarf secondary companion having 0.3 M_{☉}, and a semimajor axis of only 0.005 AU (1.1 R_{☉}).

The surrounding nebula is inclined about 85° to the line of sight from the Earth. The torus of this nebula is notable for its high expansion velocity, measured at up to 60–70 km/s. It displays collimated outflows, possibly as a result of the CE behavior of the central stars or else a short-lived accretion disk. The pair of jets are located along a position angle of 15°, showing fast outflow with radial velocities of around 100 km/s. The nebula is notable for the rich amount of filamentary "low-ionization structures", or LIS, resembling the wispy structures of nova explosions. These too may be the result of the CE interaction.

In addition to a higher than normal helium abundance, the nebula displays unusually strong optical recombination lines from heavier elements; one of the highest known among PNe. These may be the result of a very late thermal pulse, or "final flash", following the initial ejection of the stellar envelope that formed the nebula. The pulse would have ejected chemically enriched material into the old nebula, changing its abundances.
