= 15 Aquilae =

Star in the constellation Aquila

Observation data Epoch J2000 Equinox ICRS
- Constellation: Aquila
- Right ascension: 19^{h} 04^{m} 57.67233^{s}
- Declination: −04° 01′ 53.1059″
- Apparent magnitude (V): 5.41

Characteristics
- Spectral type: K1 III
- U−B color index: +1.01
- B−V color index: +1.12

Astrometry
Radial velocity (R_{v})	−23.17±0.61 km/s
Proper motion (μ)	RA: +21.90 mas/yr Dec.: −26.05 mas/yr
Parallax (π)	11.27±0.36 mas
Distance	289 ± 9 ly (89 ± 3 pc)
Absolute magnitude (M_{V})	0.414

Details
Radius	14 R_{☉}
Luminosity	83 L_{☉}
Surface gravity (log g)	2.65 cgs
Temperature	4,560 K
Metallicity [Fe/H]	−0.25 dex
Rotational velocity (v sin i)	3.4 km/s
Age	4.09 ± 2.07 Gyr

Other designations
- h Aquilae, AAVSO 1859-04, BD−04°4684, HD 177463, HIP 93717, HR 7225, SAO 142996

Database references
SIMBAD	data

15 Aquilae (abbreviated 15 Aql) is a star in the equatorial constellation of Aquila. 15 Aquilae is the Flamsteed designation; it also bears the Bayer designation h Aquilae. The apparent visual magnitude is 5.41, so it is faintly visible to the naked eye. An optical companion, HD 177442, is 39 arc seconds away from it The distance to 15 Aquilae can be estimated from its annual parallax shift of 11.27 mas, yielding a range of approximately 289 light-years (89 parsecs) from Earth with a 9 light-year margin of error.

With a stellar classification of K1 III, the spectrum of 15 Aquilae matches a giant star with an age of roughly four billion years. At this stage of its evolution, the outer atmosphere of the star has expanded to 14 times the radius of the Sun. It is radiating 83 times the Sun's luminosity into space at an effective temperature of 4,560 K. This heat gives it the orange-hued glow of a K-type star.

This star is most likely a member of the thin disk population of the Milky Way. It is orbiting through the galaxy with an eccentricity of 0.06, which carries it as close as 24.30 kly (7.45 kpc) to the Galactic Center, and as far away as 27.60 kly (8.46 kpc). The orbital inclination carries it no more than 196 ly (60 pc) from the galactic plane.
