= V603 Aquilae =

1918 Nova event in the constellation Aquila

V603 Aquilae or Nova Aquilae 1918
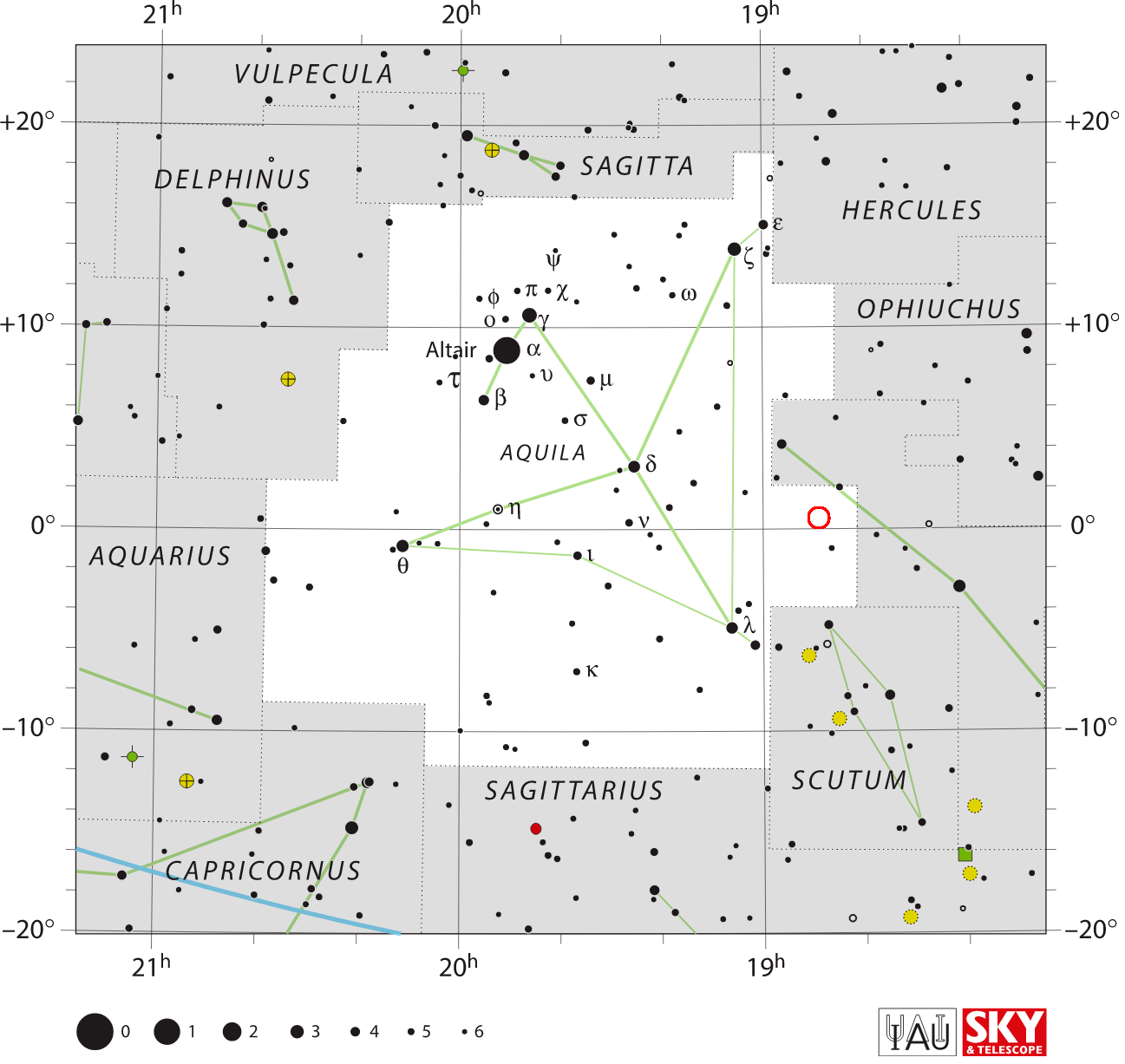
- Location of V603 Aquilae (circled in red)

Observation data Epoch J2000 Equinox ICRS
- Constellation: Aquila
- Right ascension: 18^{h} 48^{m} 54.637^{s}
- Declination: 00° 35′ 02.86″
- Apparent magnitude (V): −1.4 to 12.7

Characteristics
- Spectral type: sd:Be+
- B−V color index: −0.2±0.5
- Variable type: Nova

Astrometry
Radial velocity (R_{v})	−23 km/s
Proper motion (μ)	RA: 10.81 mas/yr Dec.: −8.86 mas/yr
Distance	1,020^{+23}_{−23} ly (314+7 −7 pc)

Other designations
- Nova Aql 1918, Nova Aquilae 1918, AAVSO 1843+00, HD 174107, HIP 92316, PLX 4341, GCRV 68659, GSC 00448-00423, 2MASS J18485464+0035030

Database references
SIMBAD	data

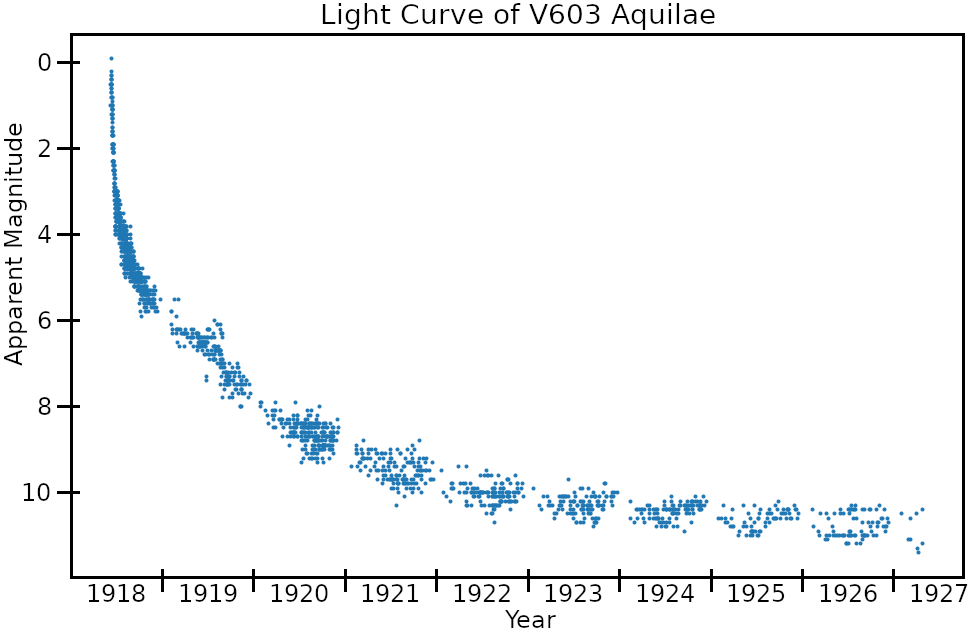
The light curve of V603 Aquilae, from AAVSO visual band data

V603 Aquilae (or Nova Aquilae 1918) was a bright nova first observed (from Earth) in the constellation Aquila in 1918. It was the brightest "new star" to appear in the sky since Kepler's Supernova in 1604. Like all novae, it is a binary system, comprising a white dwarf and donor low-mass star in close orbit to the point of being only semidetached. The white dwarf sucks matter off its companion, which has filled its Roche lobe, onto its accretion disk and surface until the excess material is blown off in a thermonuclear event. This material then forms an expanding shell, which eventually thins out and disappears.

First seen by Zygmunt Laskowski, a medical professor and amateur astronomer, and then confirmed on the night of 8 June 1918 by the UK amateur astronomer Grace Cook, Nova Aquilae reached a peak magnitude of −0.5; it was the brightest nova recorded in the era of the telescope. It was brighter than all stars but Sirius and Canopus. Tycho's and Kepler's supernovae were brighter, but both occurred before the invention of the telescope. Originally a star system with a magnitude of 11.43, it took twelve days to fade three magnitudes and then 18.6 years to fade to quiescence. In 1964 Robert P. Kraft ascertained that it was a binary system, recently determined to be true for several other novae at the time.

The star system has settled to an average apparent magnitude of 11.4 since the 1940s, fading by around 1/100 of a magnitude per decade. The nova's parallax, 3.191±0.069 milliarcseconds, was measured by the Gaia spacecraft which implies a distance of 1020±23 light years. Spectroscopic analysis conducted by Arenas and colleagues indicated the system consisted of a white dwarf of about 1.2 times as massive as the sun, with an accretion disk, and a companion star with about 20% of the Sun's mass. This second star is most likely a red dwarf. The two stars orbit each other approximately every 3 hours 20 minutes.

In 1983 VLA observations detected radio emission from this nova at 5 GHz. The upgraded JVLA detected 8.9 GHz emission in 2013, and MeerKAT detected 1.3 GHz emission in 2019. The radio emission is consistent with gyrosynchrotron, cyclotron maser and optically thick synchrotron emission.

== See also ==
- List of novae in the Milky Way galaxy
- Supernova
