= Omega Aquilae =

The Bayer designation Omega Aquilae (ω Aql / ω Aquilae) is shared by two stars in the constellation Aquila:

- Omega¹ Aquilae (Flamsteed designation 25 Aquilae.)
- Omega² Aquilae (Flamsteed designation 29 Aquilae.)

They are separated by 0.51° on the sky.
