= NGC 6760 =

Globular cluster in the constellation Aquila

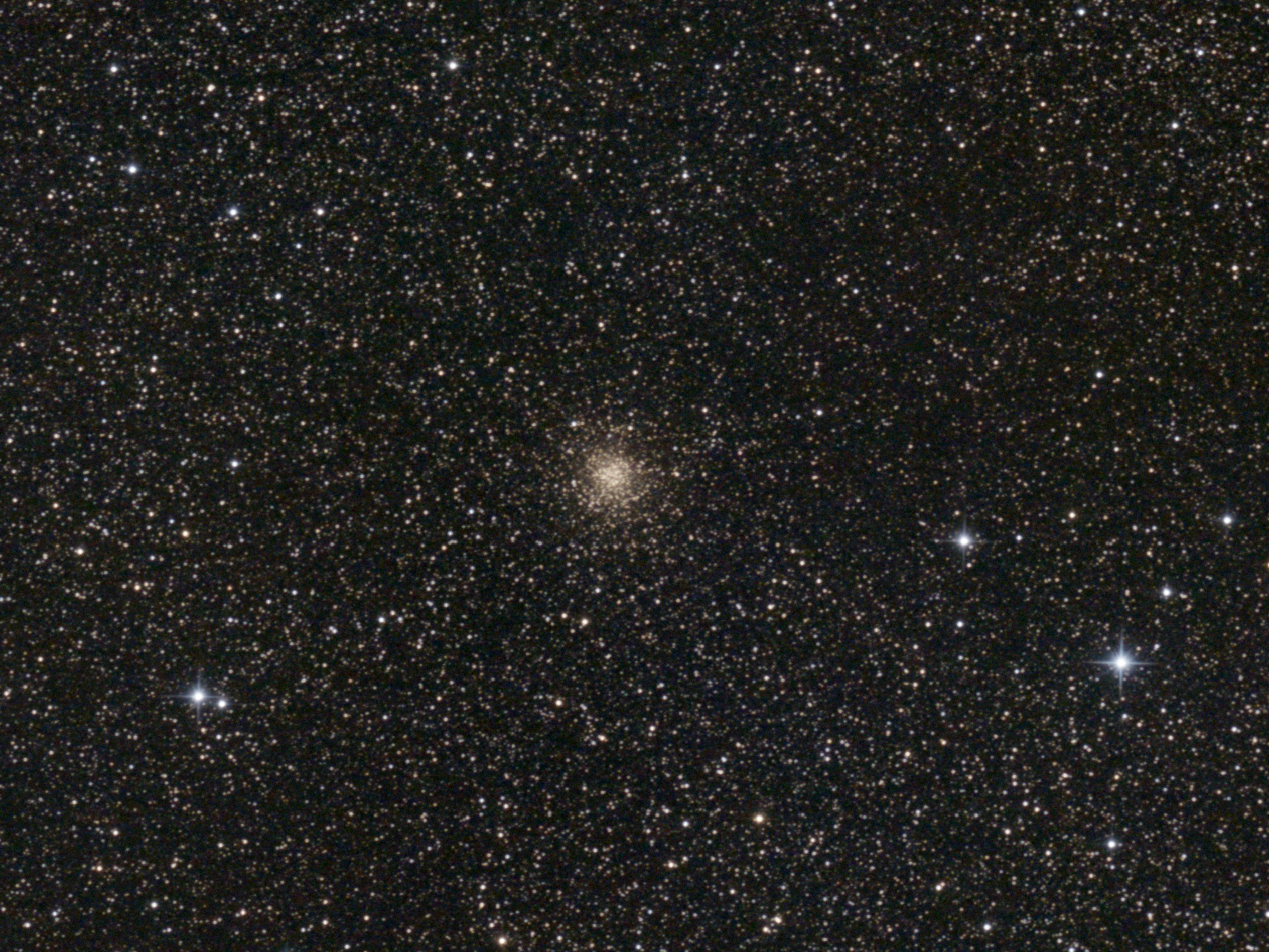

Observation data (J2000 epoch)
- Class: IX:
- Constellation: Aquila
- Right ascension: 19^{h} 11^{m} 12.1^{s}
- Declination: +01° 01′ 49.7″
- Distance: 24.1 kly (7.4 kpc)
- Apparent magnitude (V): 9.8
- Apparent dimensions (V): 4.8'

Physical characteristics
- Mass: 3.57×10^{5} M_{☉}
- Metallicity: [Fe/H] = –0.40 dex
- Other designations: C 1908+009, GCl 109

NGC 6760 is a globular cluster in the constellation Aquila. It may have contributed to the formation of the open cluster Ruprecht 127 during NGC 6760's passage through the galactic disk 71 million years ago.

At least two millisecond pulsars have been found in NGC 6760.
