= Tau Aquilae =

Star in the constellation Aquila

- Location of τ Aquilae (circled)

Observation data Epoch J2000.0 Equinox ICRS
- Constellation: Aquila
- Right ascension: 20^{h} 04^{m} 08.315^{s}
- Declination: +07° 16′ 40.67″
- Apparent magnitude (V): 5.6799±0.0009

Characteristics
- Evolutionary stage: horizontal branch
- Spectral type: K0 III
- U−B color index: +0.86
- B−V color index: +1.06

Astrometry
Radial velocity (R_{v})	−29.27±0.13 km/s
Proper motion (μ)	RA: +14.201 mas/yr Dec.: +12.049 mas/yr
Parallax (π)	6.0972±0.0702 mas
Distance	535 ± 6 ly (164 ± 2 pc)
Absolute magnitude (M_{V})	−0.24

Details
Mass	2.15^{+0.20}_{−0.19} M_{☉}
Radius	18.03^{+0.59}_{−0.71} R_{☉}
Luminosity	145^{+9}_{−12} L_{☉}
Surface gravity (log g)	2.26±0.04 cgs
Temperature	4,724^{+15}_{−12} K
Metallicity [Fe/H]	–0.15 dex
Age	1.0^{+0.3}_{−0.2} Gyr

Other designations
- Tianfu, τ Aquilae, τ Aql, 63 Aquilae, BD+06 4416, FK5 1524, GC 27824, HD 190327, HIP 98823, HR 7669, SAO 125403, PPM 169262

Database references
SIMBAD	data

Tau Aquilae is a star in the equatorial constellation of Aquila. Its identifier is a Bayer designation that is Latinized from τ Aquilae, and abbreviated Tau Aql or τ Aql. The star has the proper name Tianfu, after a traditional Chinese constellation. An apparent visual magnitude of 5.7 indicates it is a faint star that is visible to the naked eye from dark suburban skies; at least according to the Bortle Dark-Sky Scale. The annual orbital motion of the Earth causes a parallax shift of 6.1 mas, which means the distance to this star is approximately 535 light-years (164 parsecs). The magnitude of the star is diminished by 0.28 from extinction caused by interstellar gas and dust. It is drifting closer to the Sun with a radial velocity of −29 km/s.

The spectrum of Tau Aquilae matches a stellar classification of K0 III, with the luminosity class of III suggesting this is an evolved giant star that has exhausted the supply of hydrogen at its core and left the main sequence of stars like the Sun. At an estimated age of one billion years, stellar models give a 90% chance that it is currently on the horizontal branch and is fusing helium at the core. Based on this assumption, it has 2.15 times the mass of the Sun and has expanded to 18 times the Sun's girth. The outer envelope is radiating energy into space with an effective temperature of 4,660 K, giving it the orange hued glow of a K-type star.

Tianfu (天桴) was an ancient Chinese constellation consisting of four stars. τ Aquilae was the first star of an early version of this constellation, before the Tang dynasty. The IAU Working Group on Star Names approved the name Tianfu for this star on May 16, 2024 and it is now so entered in the IAU Catalog of Star Names. (See also θ Aquilae.)
