= Zygmunt Laskowski =

Polish physician, surgeon and anatomist (1841–1928)

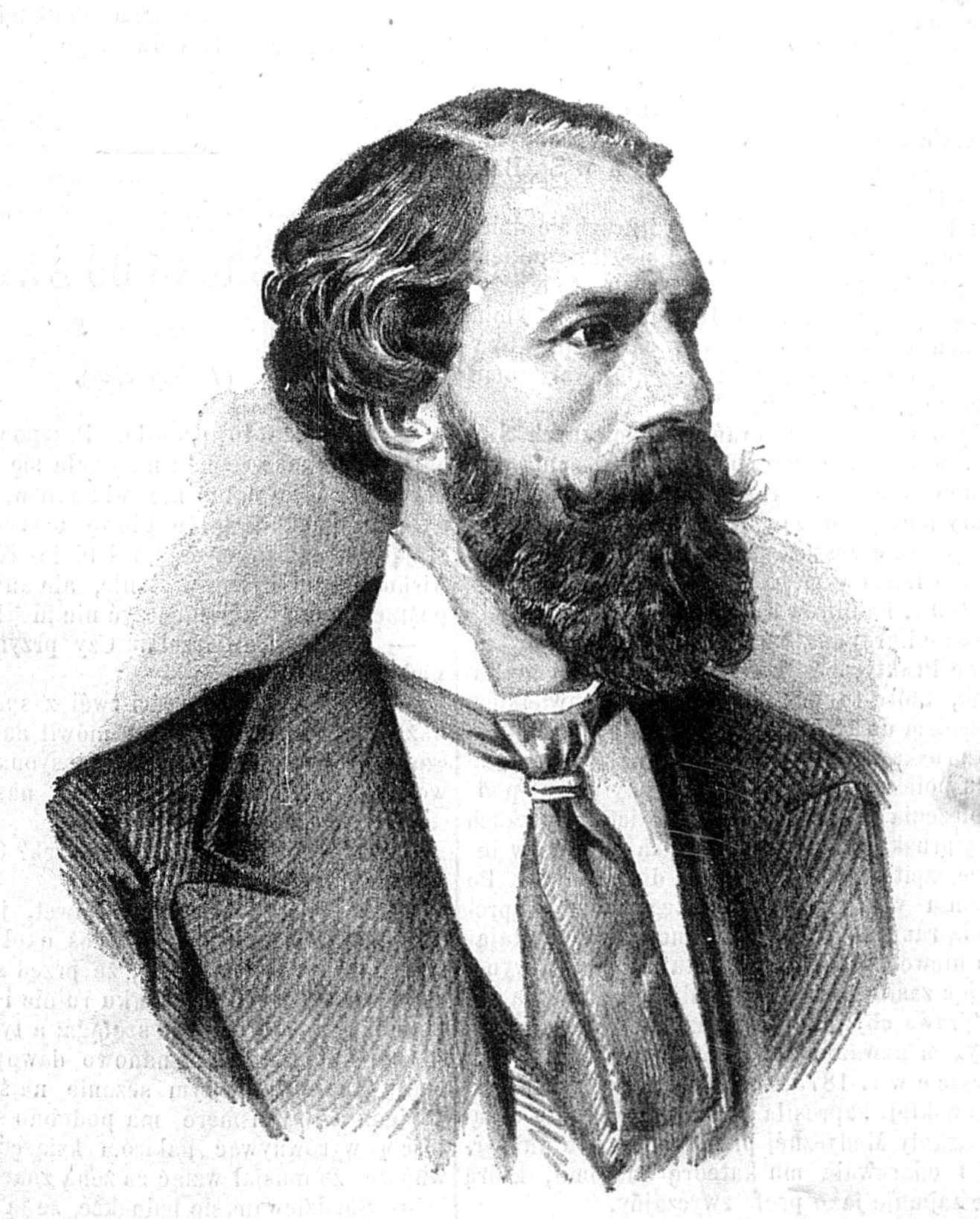
Laskowski

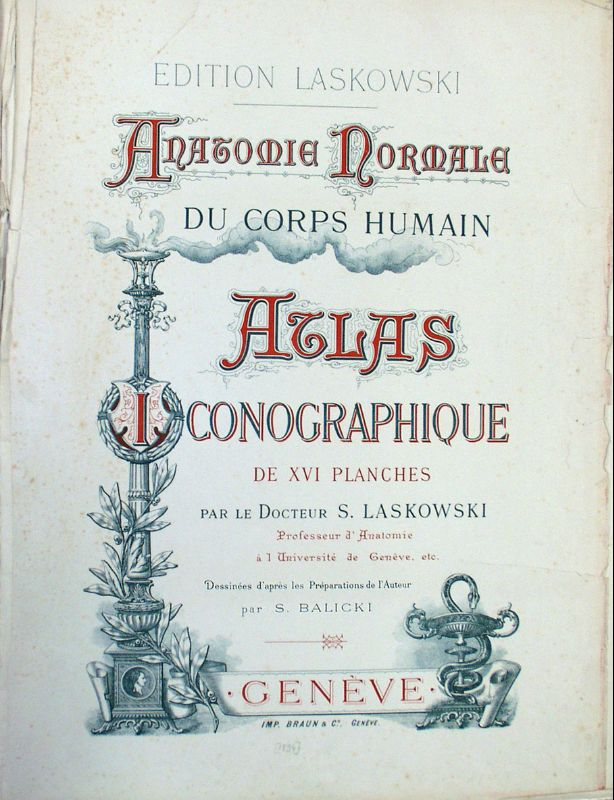
Frontispiece to Laskowski's anatomical atlas, published in Geneva in 1893

Zygmunt or Sigismond Laskowski (19 January 1841 – 15 April 1928) was a Polish physician, surgeon, and anatomist.

== Life ==
Born in Warsaw, he studied at the University of Warsaw and in 1863 fought in the January Uprising. After its defeat he went into exile in France, completing his medical studies in Paris and London between 1864 and 1855. In 1866 he invented a new method of embalming and conserving anatomical specimens, for which he received medals at the Expositions Universelles of 1867 and 1878 as well as another medal in Kraków in 1869.

Between 1869 and 1875 he was docent of anatomy and surgery at the Faculty of Medicine within Paris's University of France. He fought in the Franco-Prussian War as head surgeon of a field ambulance unit, before serving in the Siege of Paris. He moved to Geneva at the invitation of the canton's state council, founding an anatomical museum there. He was a member of the 'Liga Narodowa' (National League), a clandestine organisation hoping to gain Polish independence.

He gained an honorary doctorate from the Jagiellonian University in 1900, whilst his amateur astronomical studies led him to discover the supernova V603 Aquilae, which he first observed on 9 June 1918. He died in Geneva.

== Works ==
- Les procédés de conservation des pièces anatomiques (1885)
- L’embaumement et la conservation des sujets et des préparations anatomiques (1886)
- Grand atlas anatomique (1877)
- Atlas iconographique de l'anatomie normale du corps humain (1894).
