= V Aquilae =

Star in the constellation Aquila

- Location of V Aquilae (circled)

Observation data Epoch J2000 Equinox ICRS
- Constellation: Aquila
- Right ascension: 19^{h} 04^{m} 24.155^{s}
- Declination: −05° 41′ 05.44″
- Apparent magnitude (V): 6.6 - 8.4

Characteristics
- Evolutionary stage: AGB
- Spectral type: C5,4-C6,4(N6)
- B−V color index: +4.32
- Variable type: SRb

Astrometry
Radial velocity (R_{v})	+37 km/s
Proper motion (μ)	RA: 6.243±0.407 mas/yr Dec.: −1.379±0.318 mas/yr
Parallax (π)	2.4779±0.2320 mas
Distance	1,300 ± 100 ly (400 ± 40 pc)
Absolute magnitude (M_{V})	−5.19

Details
Mass	2.5 M_{☉}
Radius	234 R_{☉}
Luminosity	6,500 L_{☉}
Surface gravity (log g)	−0.108 cgs
Temperature	2,800 K
Metallicity [Fe/H]	0.10 dex

Other designations
- BD−05 4858, HD 177336, HIP 93666, HR 7220, SAO 142985

Database references
SIMBAD	data

V Aquilae (V Aql) is a carbon star and semiregular variable star in the constellation Aquila. It has an apparent magnitude which varies between 6.6 and 8.4 and is located around 400 parsecs (1,300 ly) away.

V Aquilae is a type of star with a spectrum that is dominated by strong absorption lines of the molecules C_{2} and CN, hence known as carbon stars. The enhanced levels of carbon in the atmosphere originate from recently nucleosynthesized material that has been dredged up to the surface by deep convection during temporary shell burning events known as thermal pulses. Published spectral types for the star vary somewhat from C5_{4} to C6_{4}, or N6 under an older system of classification. The subscript 4 refers to the strength of the molecular carbon bands in the spectrum, an indicator of the relatively abundances of carbon in the atmosphere.

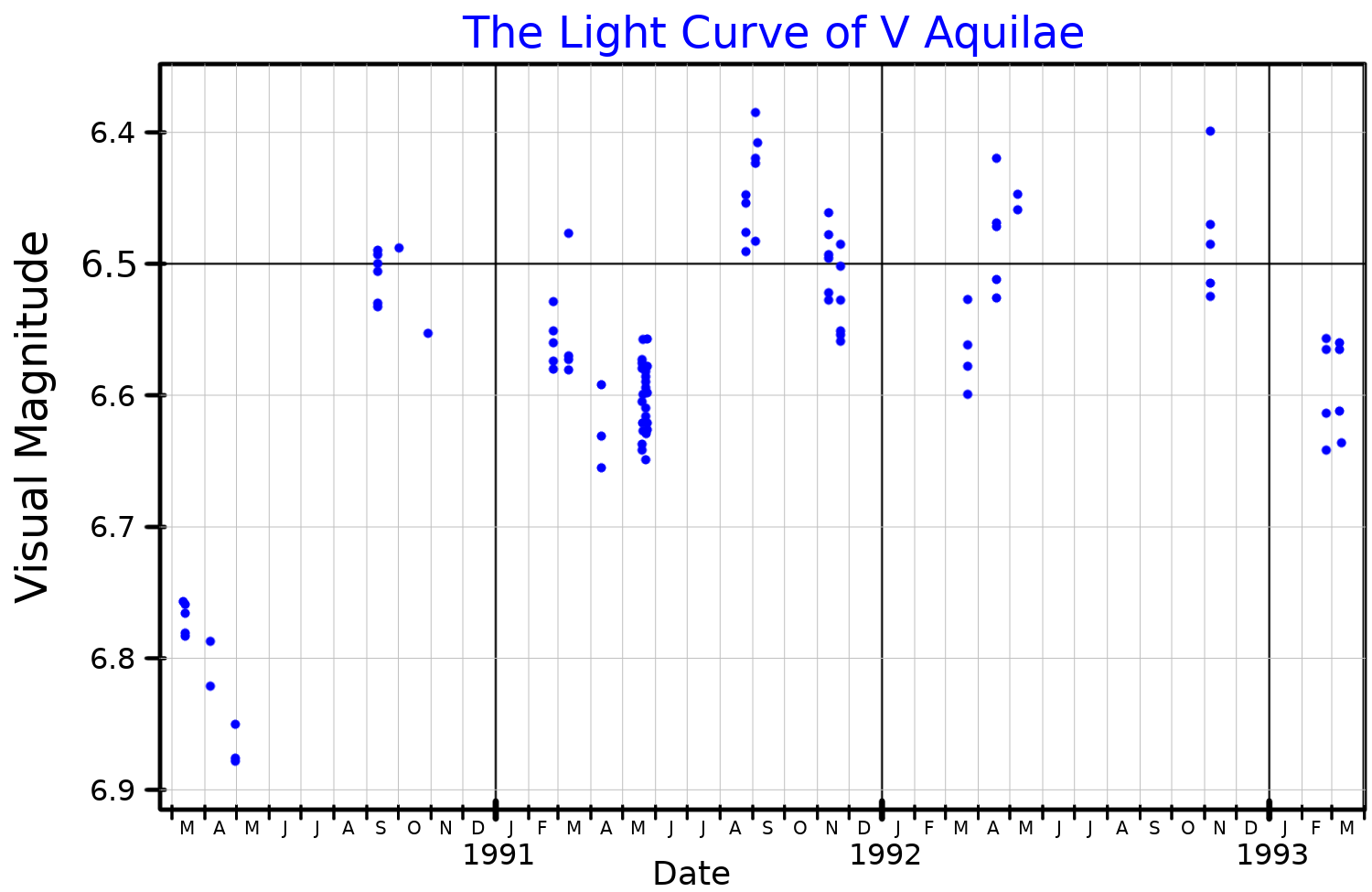
A light curve for V Aquilae, plotted from Hipparcos data

V Aquilae is a variable star of type SRb. Its variability was first announced by George Knott in 1871. It has a published period of 400 days, but other periods are found including 350 days and 2,270 days.
