= Aquila (constellation) =

Constellation near the celestial equator

- Constellation
- List of stars in Aquila
- Abbreviation: Aql
- Genitive: Aquilae
- Pronunciation: /ˈækwɪlə/ Áquila, occasionally /əˈkwɪlə/; genitive /ˈækwɪliː/
- Symbolism: the Eagle
- Right ascension: 18^{h} 41^{m} 18.2958^{s}–20^{h} 38^{m} 23.7231^{s}
- Declination: 18.6882229°–−11.8664360°
- Area: 652 sq. deg. (22nd)
- Main stars: 10
- Bayer/Flamsteed stars: 65
- Stars brighter than 3.00^{m}: 3
- Stars within 10.00 pc (32.62 ly): 2
- Brightest star: Altair (α Aql) (0.76^{m})
- Nearest star: Altair (α Aql)
- Messier objects: 0
- Meteor showers: June Aquilids; Epsilon Aquilids
- Bordering constellations: Sagitta; Hercules; Ophiuchus; Serpens Cauda; Scutum; Sagittarius; Capricornus; Aquarius; Delphinus
- Visible at latitudes between +78° and −71°. Best visible at 21:00 (9 p.m.) during the month of August.

Aquila is a constellation on the celestial equator. Its name is Latin for 'eagle'. Some sources claim it represents the bird that carried Zeus/Jupiter's thunderbolts in Greco-Roman mythology, while others say it was the bird that Zeus ordered to attack Prometheus.

Aquila's brightest star, Altair, is one vertex of the Summer Triangle asterism. The constellation is located along the Milky Way. Because of this location, many clusters and nebulae are found within its borders.

== History ==
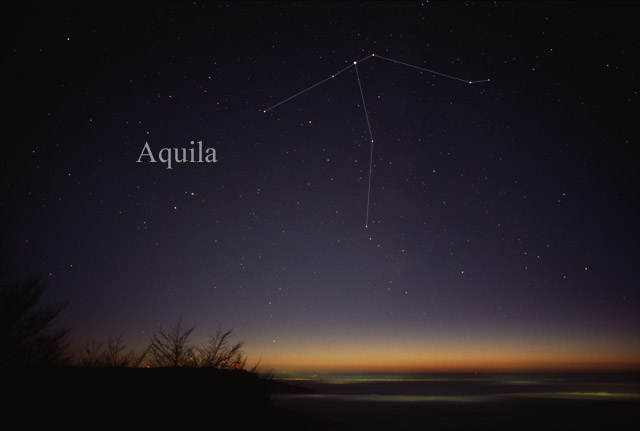
Aquila in the night sky

Aquila was one of the 48 constellations described by the second-century astronomer Ptolemy. It had been earlier mentioned by Eudoxus in the fourth century BC and Aratus in the third century BC.

It is now one of the 88 constellations defined by the International Astronomical Union. The constellation was also known as Vultur volans (the flying vulture) to the Romans, not to be confused with Vultur cadens which was their name for Lyra. It is often held to represent the eagle which held Zeus's/Jupiter's thunderbolts in Greco-Roman mythology. Aquila is also associated with the eagle that kidnapped Ganymede, a son of one of the kings of Troy (associated with Aquarius), to Mount Olympus to serve as cup-bearer to the gods.

Ptolemy catalogued 19 stars jointly in this constellation and in the now obsolete constellation of Antinous, which was named in the reign of the emperor Hadrian (AD 117–138), but sometimes erroneously attributed to Tycho Brahe, who catalogued 12 stars in Aquila and seven in Antinous. Hevelius determined 23 stars in the first and 19 in the second.

The Greek Aquila is probably based on the Babylonian constellation of the Eagle, but is sometimes mistakenly thought as a seagull which is located in the same area as the Greek constellation.

== Features ==
=== Stars ===
Aquila, which lies in the Milky Way, contains many rich starfields and has been the location of many novae.

Animation fading-in of Aquila, Delphinus, Sagitta, and the summer Milky Way as seen in Dark-sky preserve Westhavelland

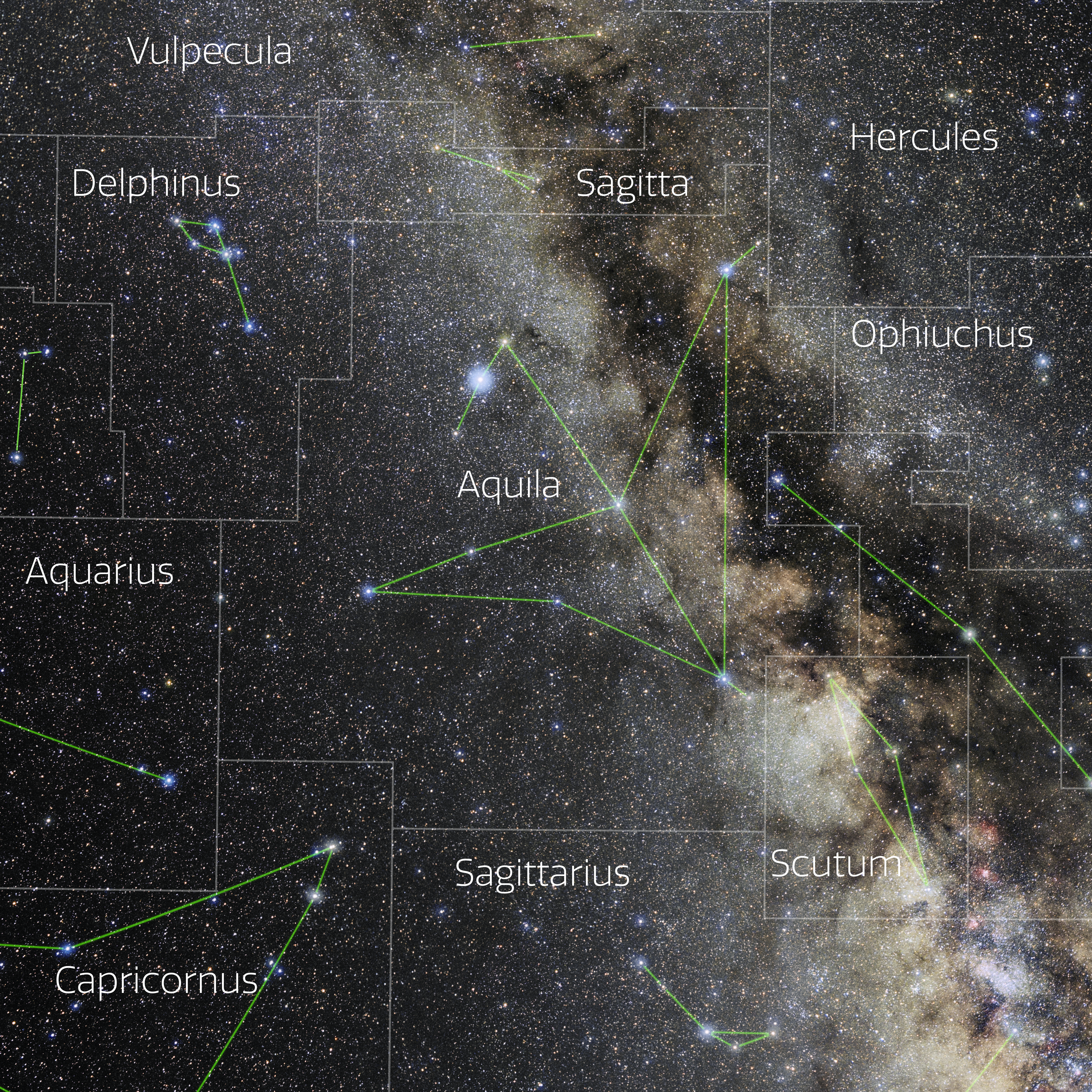
The constellation Aquila as seen in the night sky, with stars labeled and IAU-standard constellation boundaries overlaid. Altair, the brightest star, is visible at center.

- α Aql (Altair) is the brightest star in this constellation and one of the closest naked-eye stars to Earth at a distance of 17 light-years. Its name comes from the Arabic phrase al-nasr al-tair, meaning "the flying eagle". Altair has a magnitude of 0.76. It is one of the three stars of the Summer Triangle, along with Vega and Deneb. It is an A-type main-sequence star with 1.8 times the mass of the Sun and 11 times its luminosity. The star rotates quickly, and this gives the star an oblate shape where it is flattened towards the poles.
- β Aql (Alshain) is a yellow-hued star of magnitude 3.7, 45 light-years from Earth. Its name comes from the Arabic phrase shahin-i tarazu, meaning "the balance"; this name referred to Altair, Alshain, and Tarazed. The primary is a G-type subgiant star with a spectral type of G9.5 IV and the secondary is a red dwarf. The subgiant primary has three times the radius of the Sun and six times the luminosity.
- γ Aql (Tarazed) is an orange-hued giant star of around magnitude 2.7, 460 light-years from Earth. Its name, like that of Alshain, comes from the Arabic for "the balance". It is the second-brightest star in the constellation and is an unconfirmed variable star.
- ζ Aql (Okab) is a binary star of magnitude 3.0, 83 light-years from Earth. The primary is an A-type main sequence star, and the secondary has half the mass of the Sun.
- θ Aql (proper name is Antinous since 6 June 2024)
- δ Aql (proper name is Guqi since 18 June 2026).
- η Aql (proper name is Pagru since 18 June 2026) is a yellow-white-hued supergiant star, 1200 light-years from Earth. Among the brightest Cepheid variable stars, it has a minimum magnitude of 4.4 and a maximum magnitude of 3.5 with a period of 7.2 days. The variability was originally observed by Edward Pigott in 1784. There are also two companion stars which orbit the supergiant: a B-type main sequence star and an F-type main sequence star.
- ε Aql (proper name is Arin-majlep since 18 June 2026).
- ξ Aql (proper name is Libertas since 15 December 2015)
- 15 Aql is an optical double star. The primary is an orange-hued giant of magnitude 5.41 and a spectral type of K1 III, 325 light-years from Earth. The secondary is a purple-hued star of magnitude 7.0, 550 light-years from Earth. The pair is easily resolved in small amateur telescopes.
- σ Aql (proper name is Hru since 18 June 2026).
- τ Aql (proper name is Tianfu since 16 May 2024)
- 57 Aql is a binary star. The primary is a blue-hued star of magnitude 5.7 and the secondary is a white star of magnitude 6.5. The system is approximately 350 light-years from Earth; the pair is easily resolved in small amateur telescopes. Both stars in the system rotate rapidly.
- R Aql is a red-hued giant star 690 light-years from Earth. It is a Mira variable with a minimum magnitude of 12.0, a maximum magnitude of 6.0, and a period around 9 months. It has a diameter of 400 D_{☉}.
- V Aql is a typical Cool Carbon Star. It's one of the most red-colored examples of this sort of stars, observable through common amateur telescopes.
- FF Aql is a yellow-white-hued supergiant star, 2500 light-years from Earth. It is a Cepheid variable star with a minimum magnitude of 5.7, a maximum magnitude of 5.2, and a period of 4.5 days. It is a spectroscopic binary with a spectral type of F6Ib. A third star is also a member of the system, and there is also a fourth star which is probably unconnected with the main system.

=== Former stars ===
- ρ Aql, an A-type star with a lower metallicity than the Sun, moved across the border into neighboring Delphinus in 1992.

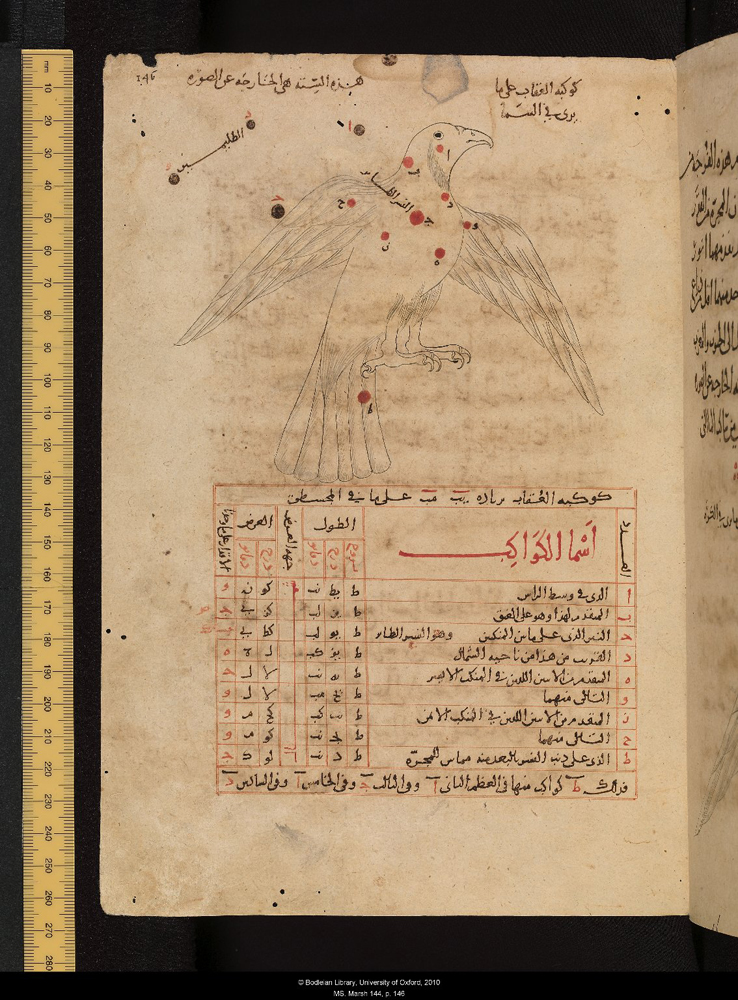
Aquila from Al-Sufi's Book of Fixed Stars, dated 1009-10

=== Named stars ===
Name	Bayer designation	Origin	Meaning	Light Years
Altair	α	Arabic	the Flying Eagle	16.7
Alshain	β	Perso-Arabic	the (peregrine) Falcon	44.4
Tarazed	γ	Persian	the Beam of the Scale	395
Guqi	δ	Chinese	Drum Flag	50.6
Arin-majlep	ε	Marshallese	Replica of the Big Eye	179
Okab	ζ	Arabic	the Tail [of the Eagle]	83
Pagru	η	Akkadian	The Dead Man	890
Antinous	θ	Greco-Roman	Antinous	286
Libertas	ξ	Latin	Liberty	186
Hru	σ	Sanskrit	Arrow	780
Tianfu	τ	Chinese	Celestial Drumstick	535

=== Novae ===
A bright nova was observed in Aquila in 1918 (Nova Aquilae 1918) and briefly shone brighter than Altair, the brightest star in Aquila. It was first seen by Zygmunt Laskowski and was confirmed on the night of 8 June 1918. Nova Aquilae reached a peak apparent magnitude of −0.5 and was the brightest nova recorded since the invention of the telescope.

=== Deep-sky objects ===
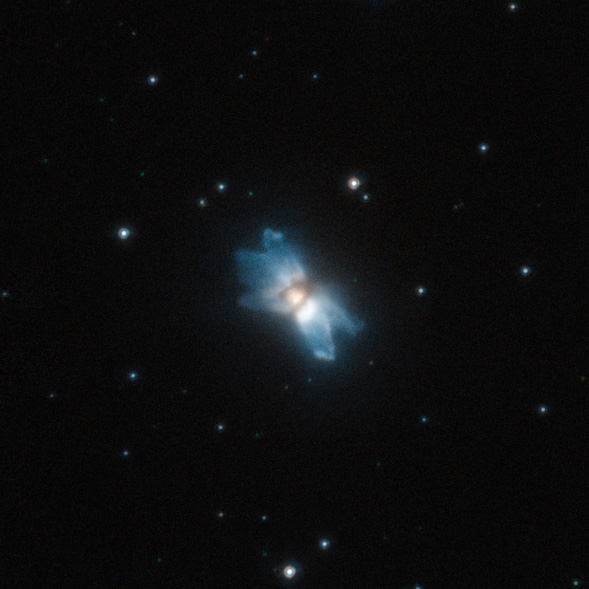
IRAS 19024+0044 is a protoplanetary nebula in Aquila.

Three interesting planetary nebulae lie in Aquila:

- NGC 6804 shows a small but bright ring.
- NGC 6781 bears some resemblance with the Owl Nebula in Ursa Major. It was discovered by William Herschel in 1788.
- NGC 6751, also known as the Glowing Eye, is a planetary nebula. The nebula is estimated to be roughly 0.8 light-years in diameter.

More deep-sky objects:

- NGC 6709 is a loose open cluster containing roughly 40 stars, which range in magnitude from 9 to 11. It is about 3000 light-years from Earth. It has an overall magnitude of 6.7. NGC 6709 appears in a rich Milky Way star field and is classified as a Shapley class d and Trumpler class III 2 m cluster. These designations mean that it does not have many stars, is loose, does not show greater concentration at the center, and has a moderate range of star magnitudes. There are 305 confirmed member stars and one candidate red giant.
- NGC 6755 is an open cluster of 7.5 m; it is made up of about a dozen stars with magnitudes 12 through 13. It is located approximately 8,060 light-years from the Solar System.
- NGC 6760 is a globular cluster of 9.1 m. At least two pulsars have been discovered in the globular cluster, and it has a Shapley-Sawyer Concentration Class of IX.
- NGC 6749 is an open cluster.
- NGC 6778 is a planetary nebula located about 10,300 light-years away from the Solar System.
- NGC 6741 is a planetary nebula.
- NGC 6772 is a planetary nebula.
- W51 (3C400) is one of the largest stellar nurseries in the Milky Way. Located about 17,000 light-years from Earth, W51 is about 350 light-years – or about 2 quadrillion miles – across. However, it's located in an area so thick with interstellar dust that it's opaque to visible light. Observations by the Chandra X-Ray Observatory and the Spitzer Infrared Telescope reveal W51 would appear about as large as the full Moon in visible light.

Aquila also holds some extragalactic objects. One of them is what may be the largest single mass concentration of galaxies in the Universe known, the Hercules–Corona Borealis Great Wall. It was discovered in November 2013, and has the size of 10 billion light years. It is the biggest and the most massive structure in the Universe known.

== Space exploration ==
NASA's Pioneer 11 space probe, which flew by Jupiter and Saturn in the 1970s, is expected to pass near the star Lambda (λ) Aquilae in about 4 million years.

== Illustrations ==
In illustrations of Aquila that represent it as an eagle, a nearly straight line of three stars symbolizes part of the wings. The center and brightest of these three stars is Altair.

== Mythology ==
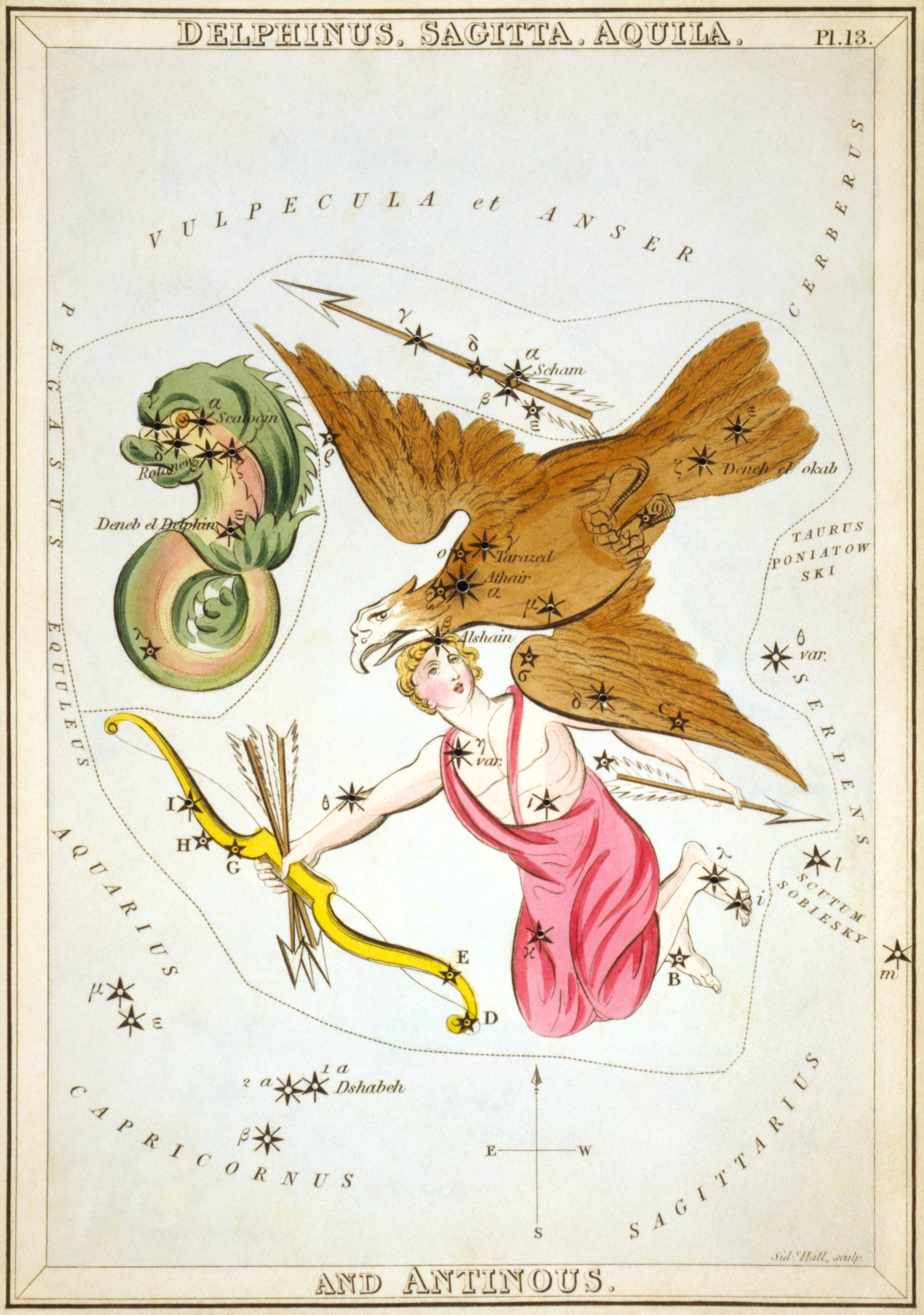
Aquila, with the now-obsolete figure of Antinous, as depicted by Sidney Hall in Urania's Mirror, a set of constellation cards published in London around 1825. At left is Delphinus.

According to Gavin White, the Babylonian Eagle carried the constellation called the Dead Man in its talons. The author also draws a comparison to the classical stories of Antinous and Ganymede.

In classical Greek mythology, Aquila was identified as Αετός Δίας (Aetos Dios), the eagle that carried the thunderbolts of Zeus and was sent by him to carry the shepherd boy Ganymede, whom he desired, to Mount Olympus; the constellation of Aquarius is sometimes identified with Ganymede.

In the Chinese love story of Qi Xi, Niu Lang (Altair) and his two children (β and γ Aquilae) are separated forever from their wife and mother Zhi Nu (Vega), who is on the far side of the river, the Milky Way.

In Hinduism, the constellation Aquila is identified with the half-eagle half-human deity Garuda.

In ancient Egypt, Aquila possibly was seen as the falcon of Horus. According to Berio, the identification of Aquila as an Egyptian constellation, and not merely Graeco-Babylonian, is corroborated by the Daressy Zodiac. It depicts an outer ring showing the Sphaera Graeca, the familiar Hellenistic zodiac, while the middle ring depicts the Sphaera Barbarica or foreigner's zodiac with the zodiacal signs of the Egyptian dodekaoros which were also recorded by Teucros of Babylon. Under the sign of Sagittarius is the falcon of Horus, presumably because Aquila rises with Sagittarius.

== Equivalents ==
In Chinese astronomy, ζ Aql is located within the Heavenly Market Enclosure (天市垣, Tiān Shì Yuán), and the other stars of the constellation are placed within the Black Tortoise of the North (北方玄武, Běi Fāng Xuán Wǔ).

Several different Polynesian equivalents to Aquila as a whole are known. On the island of Futuna, it was called Kau-amonga, meaning "Suspended Burden". Its name references the Futunan name for Orion's belt and sword, Amonga. In Hawaii, Altair was called Humu, translated to English as "to sew, to bind together parts of a fishhook." "Humu" also refers to the hole by which parts of a hook are bound together. Humu-ma was said to influence the astrologers. Pao-toa was the name for the entire constellation in the Marquesas Islands; the name meant "Fatigued Warrior". Also, Polynesian constellations incorporated the stars of modern Aquila. The Pukapuka constellation Tolu, meaning "three", was made up of Alpha, Beta, and Gamma Aquilae. Altair was commonly named among Polynesian peoples, as well. The people of Hawaii called it Humu, the people of the Tuamotus called it Tukituki ("Pound with a hammer") - they named Beta Aquilae Nga Tangata ("The Men") - and the people of Pukapuka called Altair Turu and used it as a navigational star. The Māori people named Altair Poutu-te-rangi, "Pillar of the Sky", because of its important position in their cosmology. It was used differently in different Māori calendars, being the star of February and March in one version and March and April in the other. Altair was also the star that ruled the annual sweet potato harvest.

== See also ==
- Aquila (Chinese astronomy)
